= Invasion of Leyte naval order of battle =

World War II order of battle

For the Battle of Leyte Gulf, see Leyte Gulf order of battle

Theatre and fleet commanders
for the liberation of the Philippines

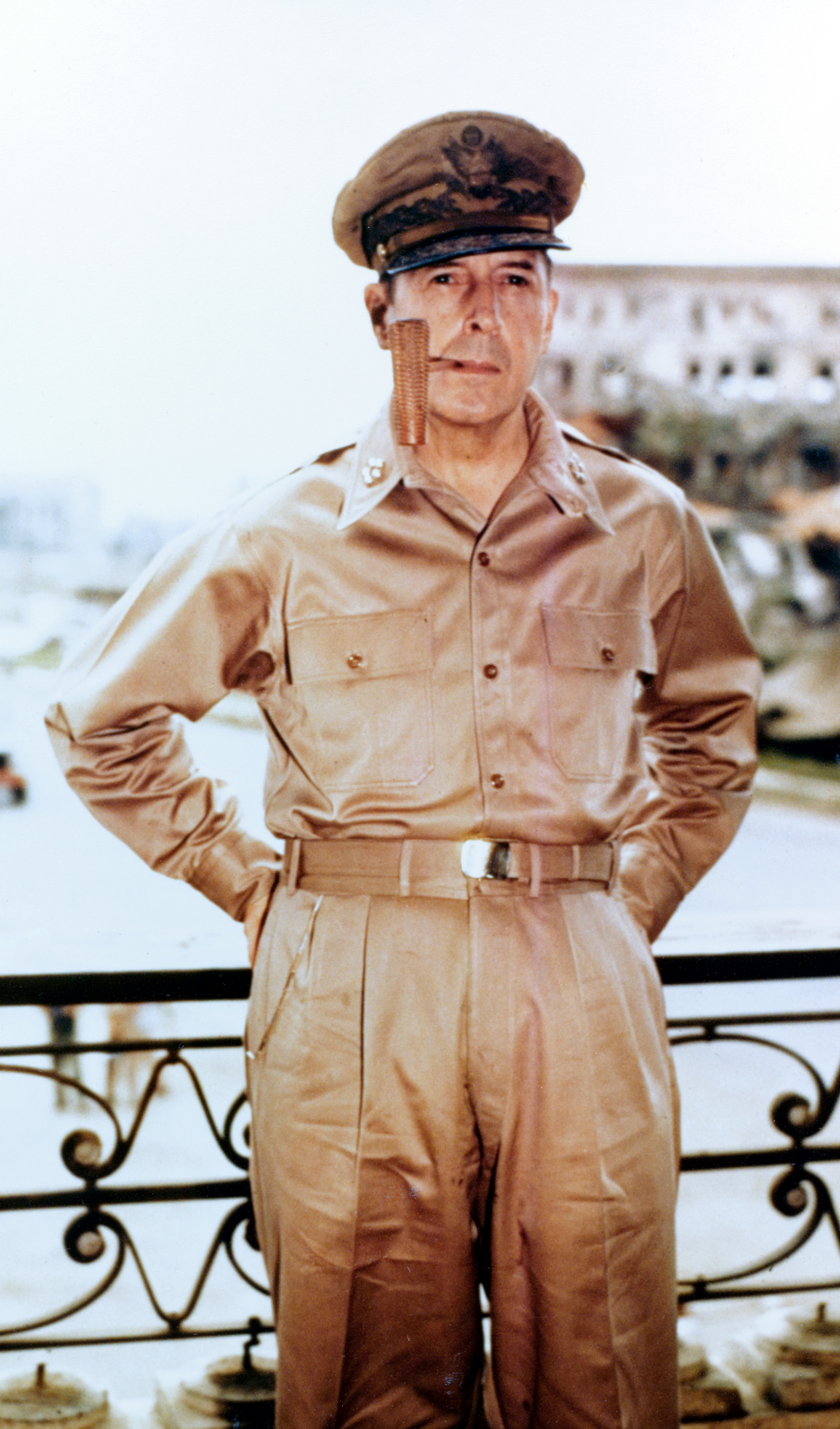
Gen. Douglas MacArthur

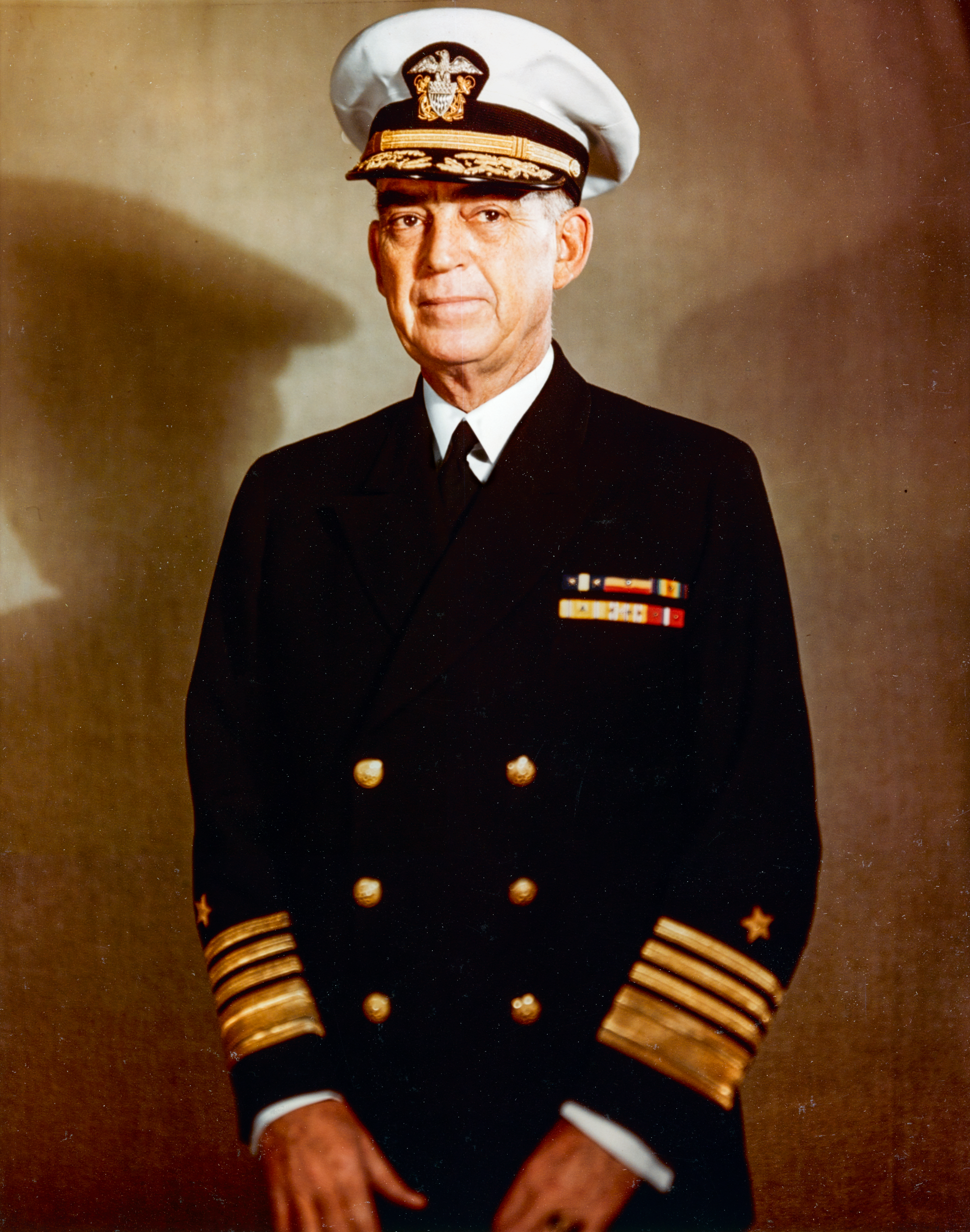
Vice Adm. Thomas C. Kinkaid

On 17 October 1944, troops of the United States Sixth Army under the direct command of Lieutenant General Walter Krueger, invaded the Philippine island of Leyte. This operation was the beginning of General Douglas MacArthur's fulfillment of his promise in March 1942 to the Filipino people that he would liberate them from Japanese rule.

MacArthur's formal title was Supreme Commander, Allied Forces, Southwest Pacific Area. The amphibious landings were carried out and supported by the United States Seventh Fleet, including 1 British and 11 Australian ships, under the direction of Vice Admiral Thomas C. Kinkaid.

Seventh Fleet

- Combat ships: 18 escort carriers, 6 old battleships, 5 heavy cruisers, (Note: Two Australian) 4 light cruisers, 34 destroyers, (Note: Two Australian) 17 destroyer escorts
- 280+ amphibious landing and support ships (Note: Three Australian)
- 110+ auxiliaries (Note: Four Australian, one British)

In case the Imperial Japanese Navy interfered, additional air cover was provided by the fast carriers of the US Third Fleet under the command of Admiral William F. Halsey, Jr..
Third Fleet

- 9 fleet carriers, 8 light carriers, 6 fast battleships, 3 heavy cruisers, 7 light cruisers, 3 anti-aircraft light cruisers, 58 destroyers

== US Seventh Fleet ==
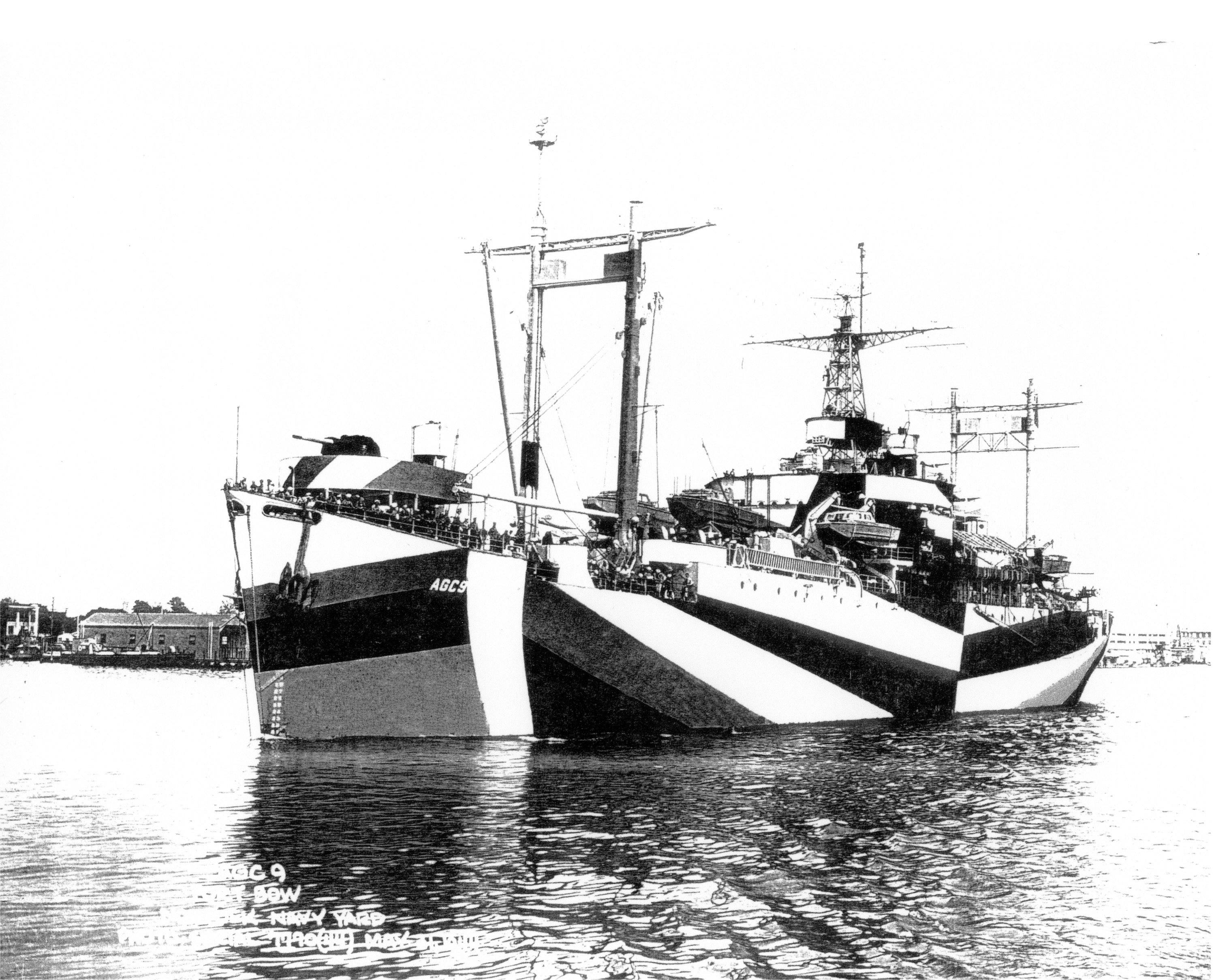
Vice Adm. Kinkaid's flagship Wasatch

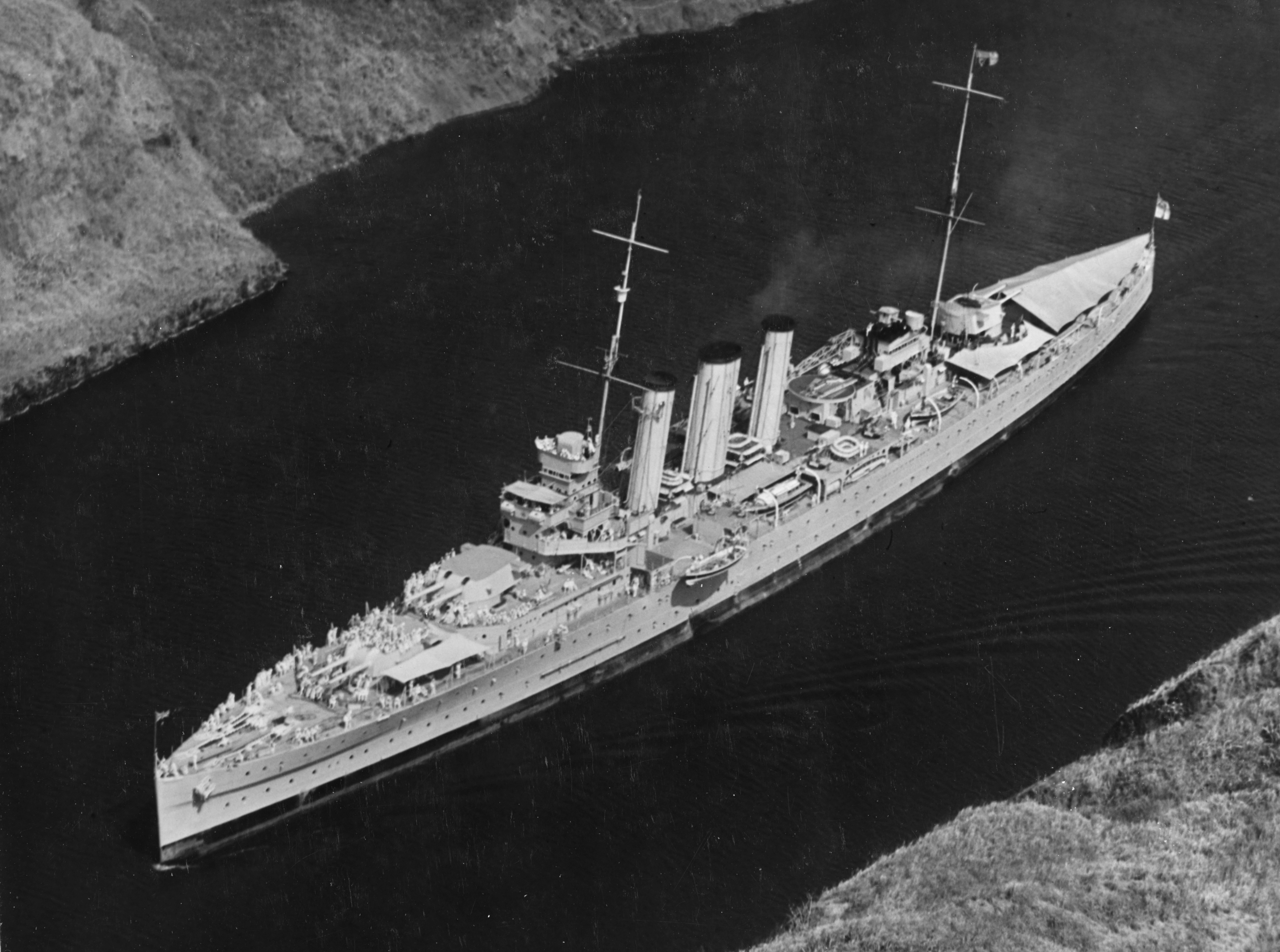
Heavy cruiser HMAS Australia passing through the Panama Canal, 1935

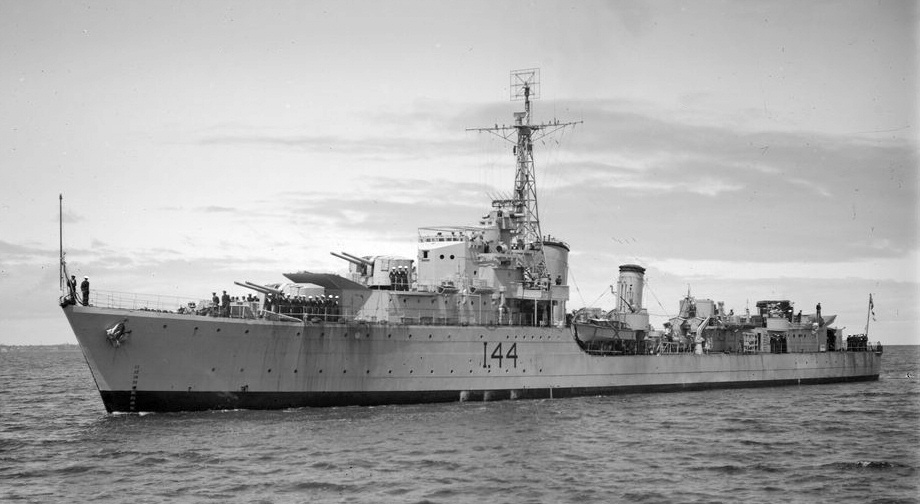
Destroyer HMAS Warramunga

Vice Admiral Thomas C. Kinkaid in amphibious command ship Wasatch

=== Combat Units ===
==== Central Philippines Attack Force (Task Force 77) ====
Vice Admiral Kinkaid

===== Flag group =====
1 light cruiser

1 Brooklyn-class (15 × 6-in. main battery): Nashville

4 destroyers

All Fletcher-class (5 × 5-in. main battery): Ammen, Abner Read, Mullany, Bush

===== Close Covering Group (Task Group 77.3) =====
Rear Admiral Russell S. Berkey

2 heavy cruisers

Both County-class (8 × 8-in. main battery): Australia, Shropshire

2 light cruisers

Both Brooklyn-class (15 × 6-in. main battery): Phoenix, Boise

6 destroyers

4 Fletcher-class (5 × 5-in. main battery): Bache, Beale, Daly, Killen
2 Tribal-class (8 × 4.7-in. main battery): Arunta, Warramunga

===== Escort Carrier Group (Task Group 77.4) =====
Taffy 1 Commander

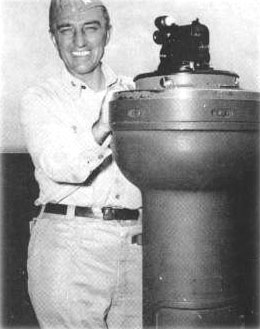
Rear Adm. Thomas L. Sprague

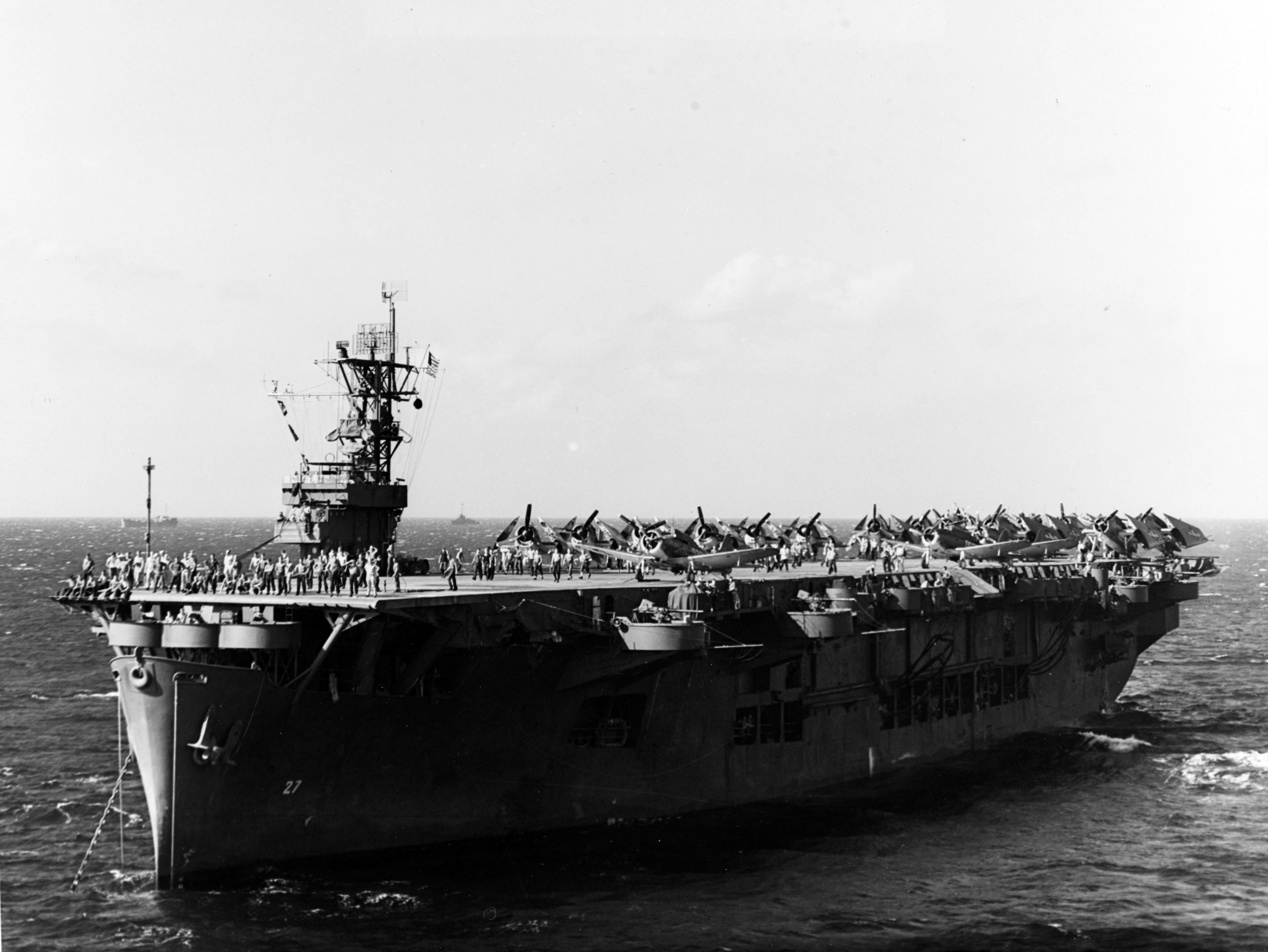
Escort carrier Suwannee

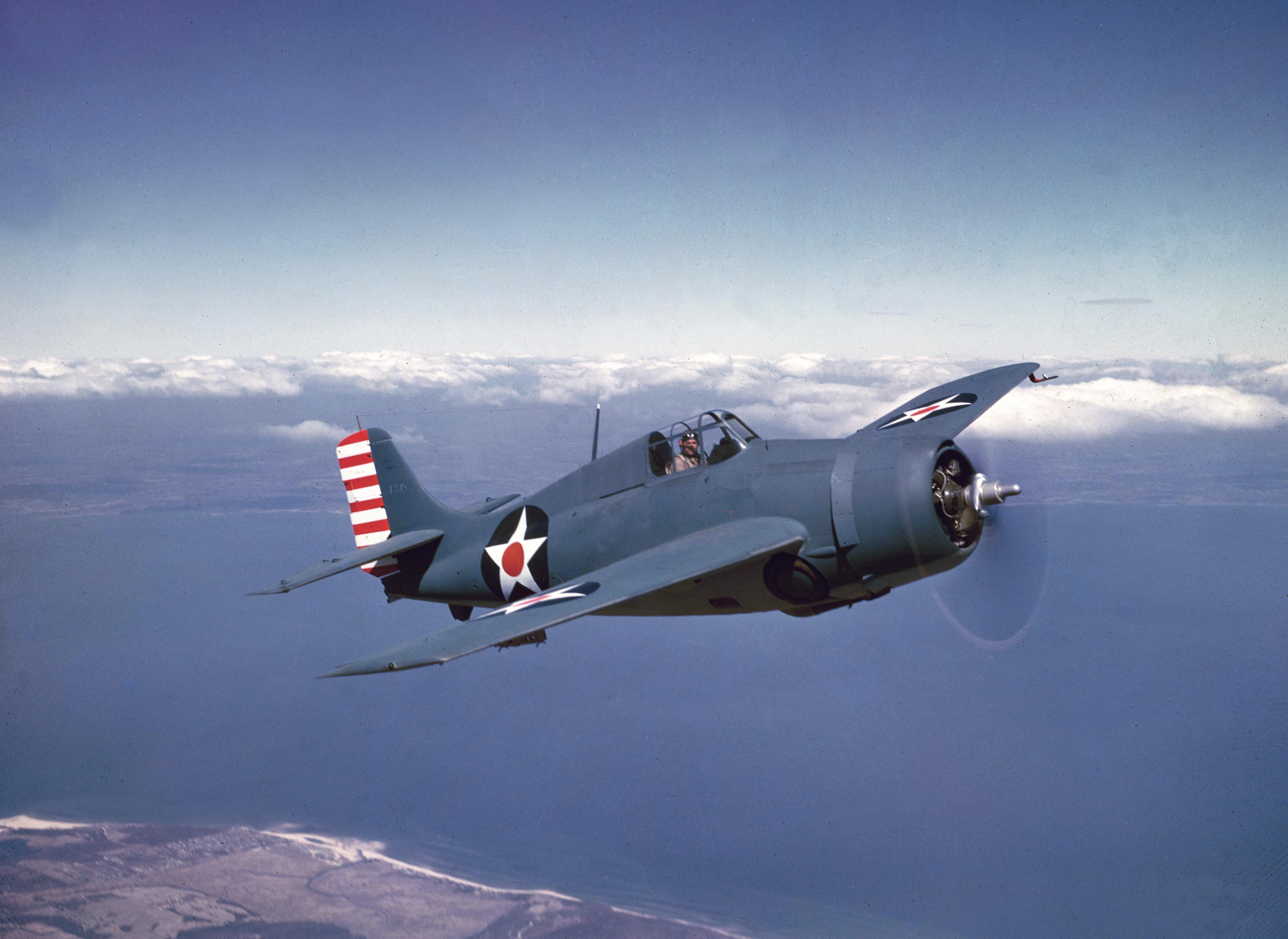
Grumman F4F Wildcat fighter

Rear Admiral Thomas L. Sprague

"Taffy 1"
Rear Admiral T.L. Sprague

6 escort carriers

Sangamon (Capt. M.E. Browder)

Air Group 37 (Lt. Cmdr. S.E. Hindman)

17 F6F Hellcat fighters
9 TBM Avenger torpedo bombers

Suwannee (Capt. W.D. Johnson)

Air Group 60 (Lt. Cmdr. H.O. Feilbach, USNR)

22 F6F Hellcat fighters
9 TBM Avenger torpedo bombers

Chenango (Capt. George van Deurs)

Air Group 35 (Lt. Cmdr. F.T. Moore)

22 F6F Hellcat fighters
9 TBM Avenger torpedo bombers

Santee (Capt. Robert E. Blick)

Air Group 26 (Lt. Cmdr. H.N. Funk)

24 FM-2 Wildcat fighters
6 TBF Avenger, 3 TBM Avenger torpedo bombers

Carrier Division 28 (Rear Adm. George R. Henderson)

Saginaw Bay (Capt. F.C. Sutton)

Composite Squadron 78 (Lt. Cmdr. J.L. Hyde, USNR)

15 FM-2 Wildcat fighters
12 TBM Avenger torpedo bombers

Petrof Bay (Capt. J.L. Kane)

Composite Squadron 76 (Lt. Cmdr. J.W. McCauley, USNR)

16 FM-2 Wildcat fighters
10 TBM Avenger torpedo bombers

Screen

3 destroyers

All Fletcher-class (5 × 5-in. main battery): McCord, Trathen, Hazelwood

5 destroyer escorts

4 John C. Butler-class (2 × 5-in. main battery): Edmonds, Richard M. Rowell, Richard S. Bull, Eversole
1 Buckley-class (3 × 3-in. main battery): Coolbaugh

Taffy 2 Commander

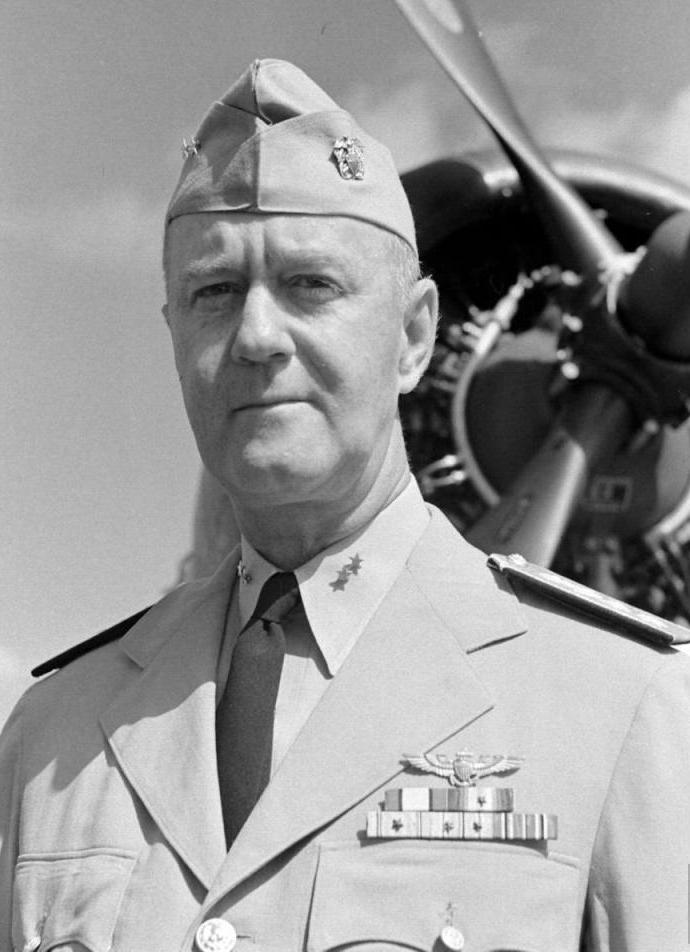
Rear Adm. Felix B. Stump

Escort carrier Savo Island

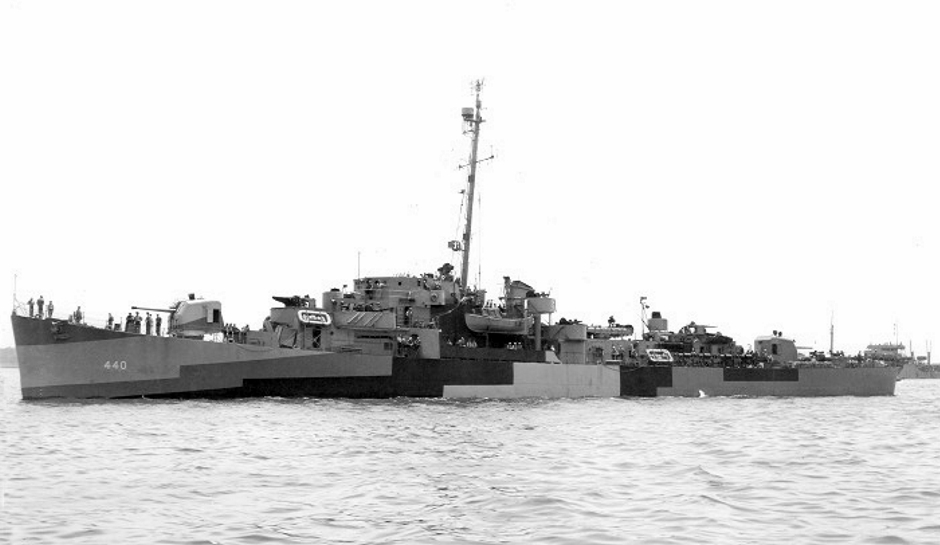
John C. Butler-class destroyer escort

"Taffy 2"
Rear Admiral Felix B. Stump

6 escort carriers

Natoma Bay (Capt. Albert K. Morehouse)

Composite Squadron 81 (Lt. Cmdr. R.C. Barnes)
16 FM-2 Wildcat fighters
12 TBM Avenger torpedo bombers

Manila Bay (Capt. Fitzhugh Lee, III)

Composite Squadron 80 (Lt. Cmdr. H.K. Stubbs, USNR)

16 FM-2 Wildcat fighters
12 TBM Avenger torpedo bombers

Carrier Division 27 (Rear Adm. William D. Sample)

Marcus Island (Capt. C.F. Greber)

Composite Squadron 21 (Lt. Cmdr T.O. Murray)

12 FM-2 Wildcat fighters
11 TBM Avenger torpedo bombers

Kadashan Bay (Capt. R.N. Hunter)

Composite Squadron 20 (Lt. Cmdr. J.R. Dale)

15 FM-2 Wildcat fighters
11 TBM Avenger torpedo bombers

Savo Island (Capt. Clarence E. Ekstrom)

Composite Squadron 27 (Lt. Cmdr. P.W. Jackson)

16 FM-2 Wildcat fighters
12 TBM Avenger torpedo bombers

Ommaney Bay (Capt. H.L. Young)

Composite Squadron 75 (Lt. Cmdr. A.W. Smith)

16 FM-2 Wildcat fighters
11 TBM Avenger torpedo bombers

Screen (Capt. L.K. Reynolds)

3 destroyers

All Fletcher-class (5 × 5-in. main battery): Haggard, Franks, Hailey

5 destroyer escorts

All John C. Butler-class (2 × 5-in. main battery): Richard W. Suesens, Abercrombie, Oberrender, LeRay Wilson, Walter C. Wann

Taffy 3 Commander

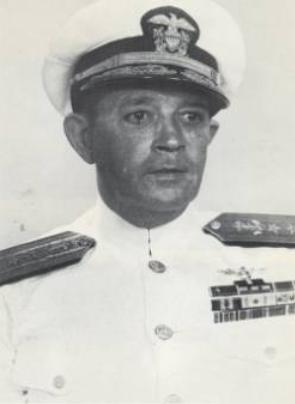
Rear Adm. Clifton A.F. Sprague

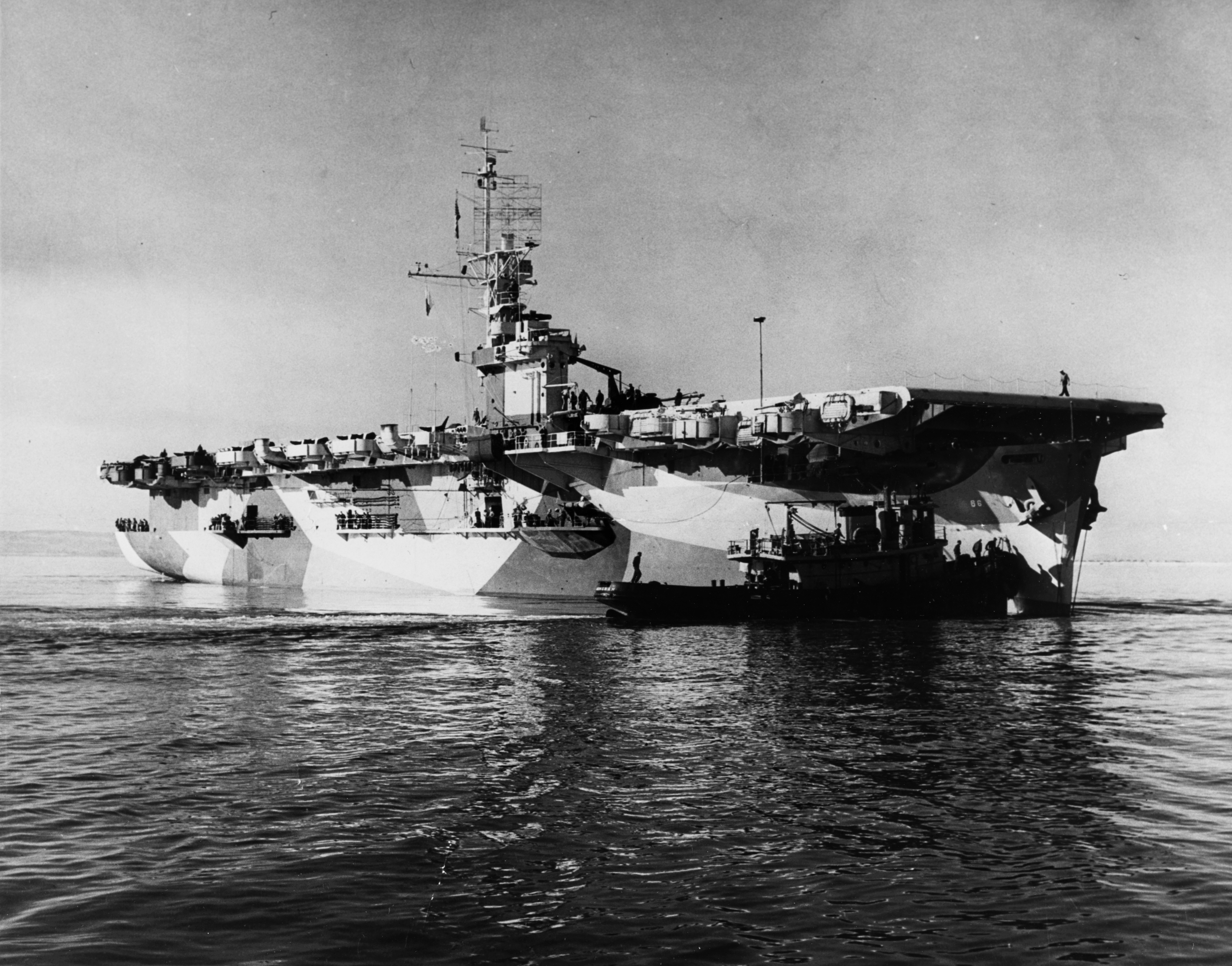
Escort carrier White Plains

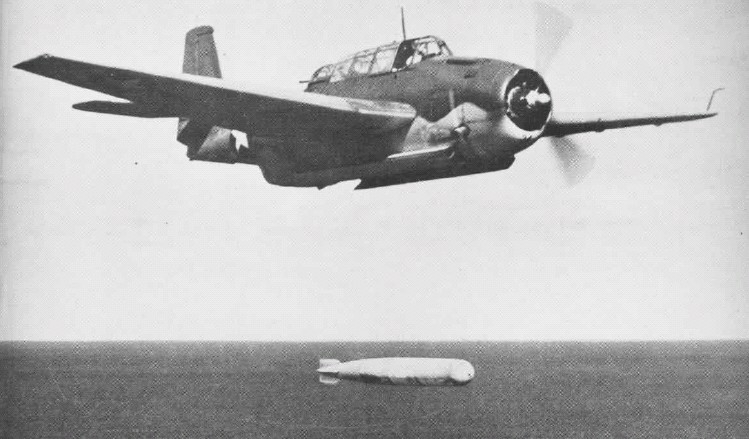
Grumman TBF Avenger torpedo bomber

"Taffy 3"
Rear Admiral Clifton A.F. Sprague

6 escort carriers

Fanshaw Bay (Capt. D.P. Johnson)

Composite Squadron 68 (Lt. Cmdr. R.S. Rogers)

16 FM-2 Wildcat fighters
12 TBM Avenger torpedo bombers

St. Lo (sunk at the Battle off Samar, 25 Oct) (Capt. Francis J. McKenna)

Composite Squadron 65 (Lt. Cmdr. R.M. Jones, USMR)

17 FM-2 Wildcat fighters
12 TBM Avenger torpedo bombers

White Plains (Capt. D.J. Sullivan)

Composite Squadron 4 (Lt. E.R. Fickenscher)

16 FM-2 Wildcat fighters
12 TBM Avenger torpedo bombers

Kalinin Bay (Capt. T.B. Williamson)

Composite Squadron 3 (Lt. Cmdr. W.H. Keighley)

16 FM-2 Wildcat fighters
1 TBF Avenger, 11 TBM Avenger torpedo bombers

Carrier Division 26 (Rear Adm. Ralph A. Ofstie)

Kitkun Bay (Capt. John P. Whitney)

Composite Squadron 5 (Cmdr. R.L. Fowler)

14 FM-2 Wildcat fighters
12 TBM Avenger torpedo bombers

Gambier Bay (sunk at the Battle off Samar, 25 Oct) (Capt. Walter V. R. Vieweg)

Composite Squadron 10 (Lt. Cmdr. E.J. Huxtable)

18 FM-2 Wildcat fighters
12 TBM Avenger torpedo bombers

Screen (Cmdr. W.D. Thomas)

3 destroyers

All Fletcher-class (5 × 5-in. main battery): Hoel (sunk at the Battle off Samar, 25 Oct), Heermann, Johnston (sunk at the Battle off Samar, 25 Oct)

4 destroyer escorts

All John C. Butler-class (2 × 5-in. main battery): Dennis, John C. Butler, Raymond, Samuel B. Roberts (sunk at the Battle off Samar, 25 Oct)

===== Minesweeping and Hydrographic Group (Task Group 77.5) =====
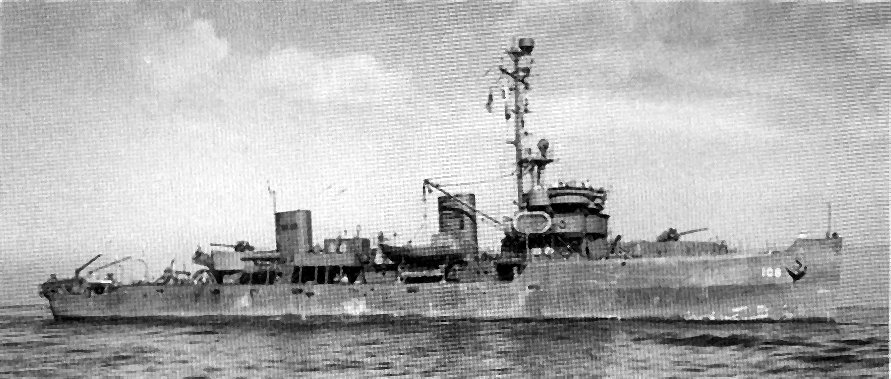
Auk-class minesweeper

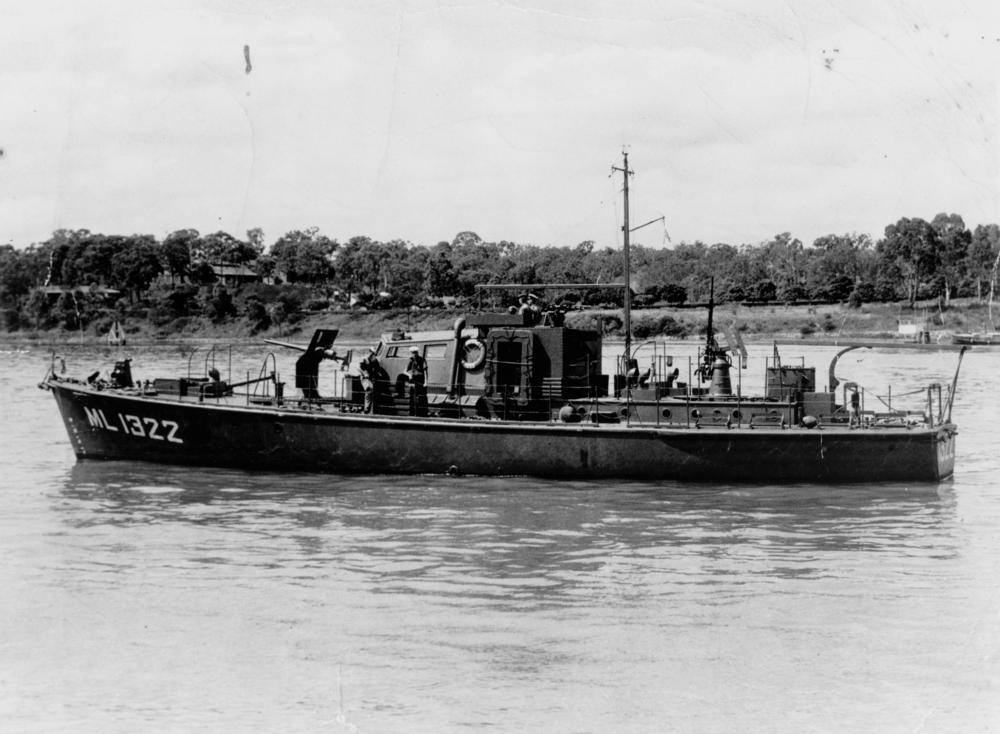
Australian harbour defence motor launch

Commander W.R. Loud

1 frigate: Gascoyne
1 destroyer transport: Sands
7 fast minesweepers: Hovey, Southard, Chandler, Long, Hamilton, Howard, Palmer
12 minesweepers

7 Auk-class: Token, Tumult, Velocity, Requisite, Pursuit, Revenge, Sage
5 Admirable-class: Salute, Saunter, Scout, Scrimmage, Sentry

2 minelayers: Preble, Breese
26 auxiliary motor minesweepers
1 harbour defence motor launch: 1074

===== Beach Demolition Group (Task Group 77.6) =====
Lt. Commander C.C. Morgan, USNR

11 fast transports

Embarking Underwater Demolition Teams 3, 4, 5, 6, 8, 9, 10 (Note: William Hopper, later an actor known for his role on the long-running TV series Perry Mason, served in this unit.)

8 ex-Clemson-class destroyers: Clemson, Goldsborough, Kane, Brooks, Belknap, Overton, Humphreys, George E. Badger
2 ex-Wickes-class destroyers: Rathburne, Talbot
1 ex-Caldwell-class destroyer: Manley

=== Amphibious Assault Units ===
==== Northern Attack Force (Task Force 78) ====
Amphibious force commander for Northern Landing Area

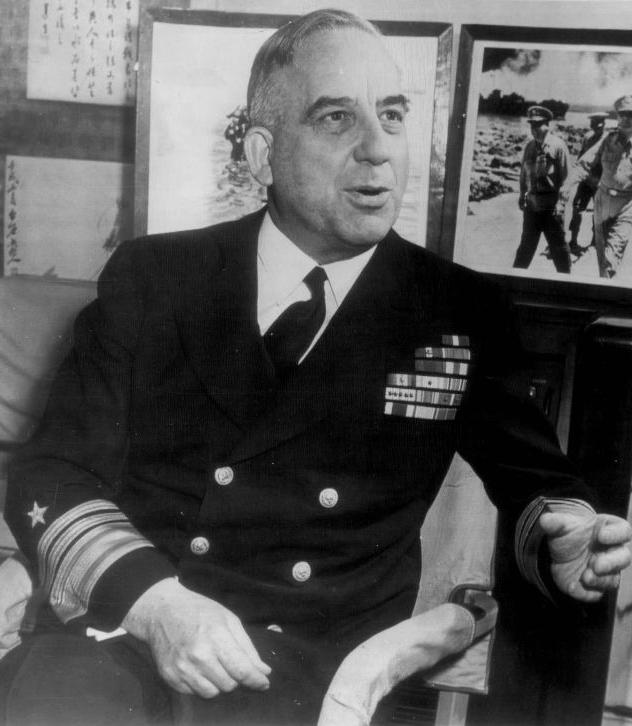
Rear Adm. Daniel E. Barbey

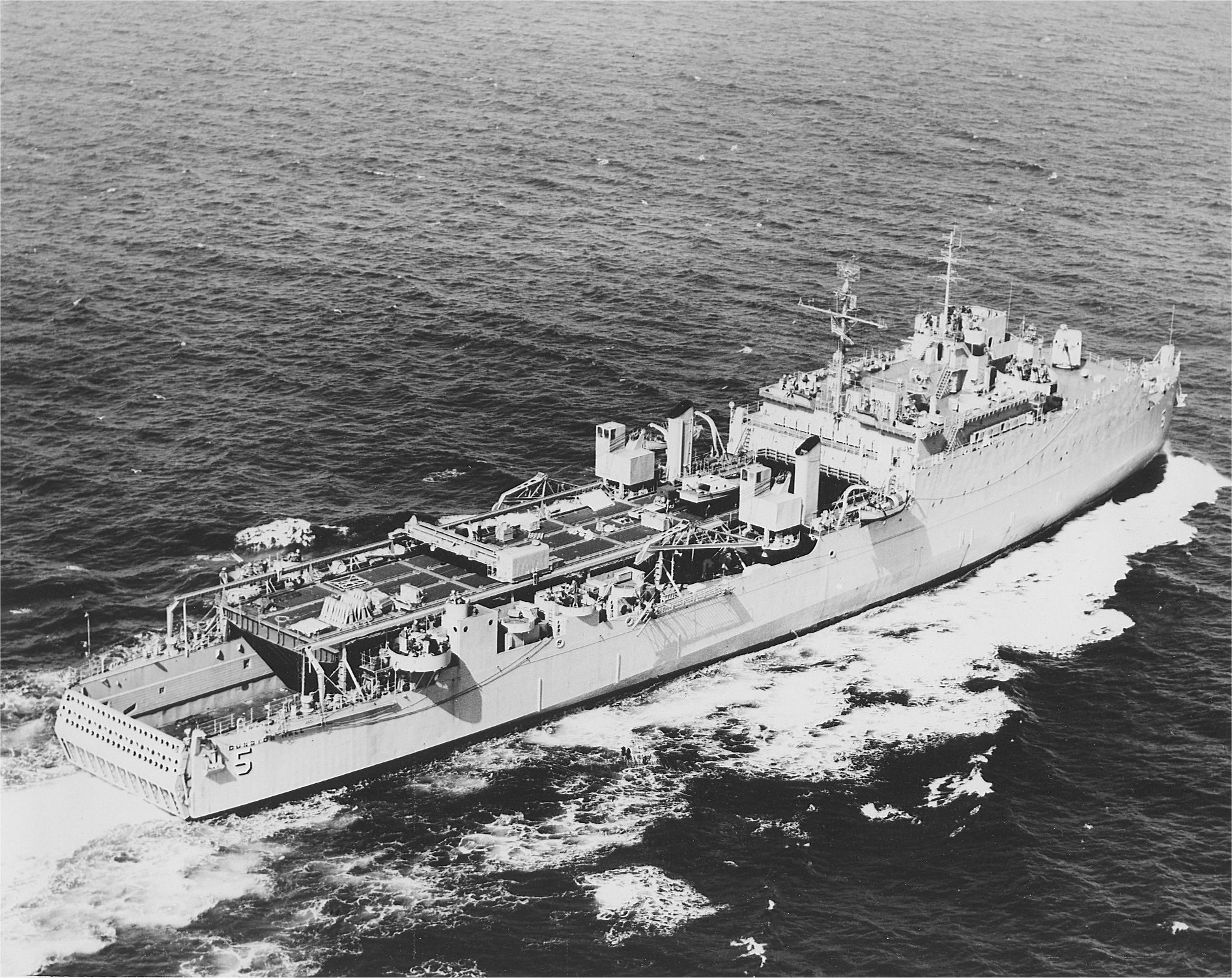
Landing ship dock Gunston Hall

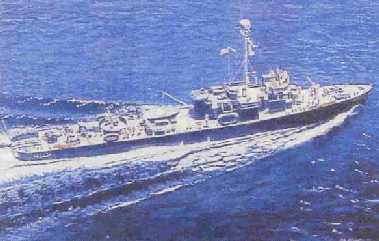
Steel-hulled sub chaser

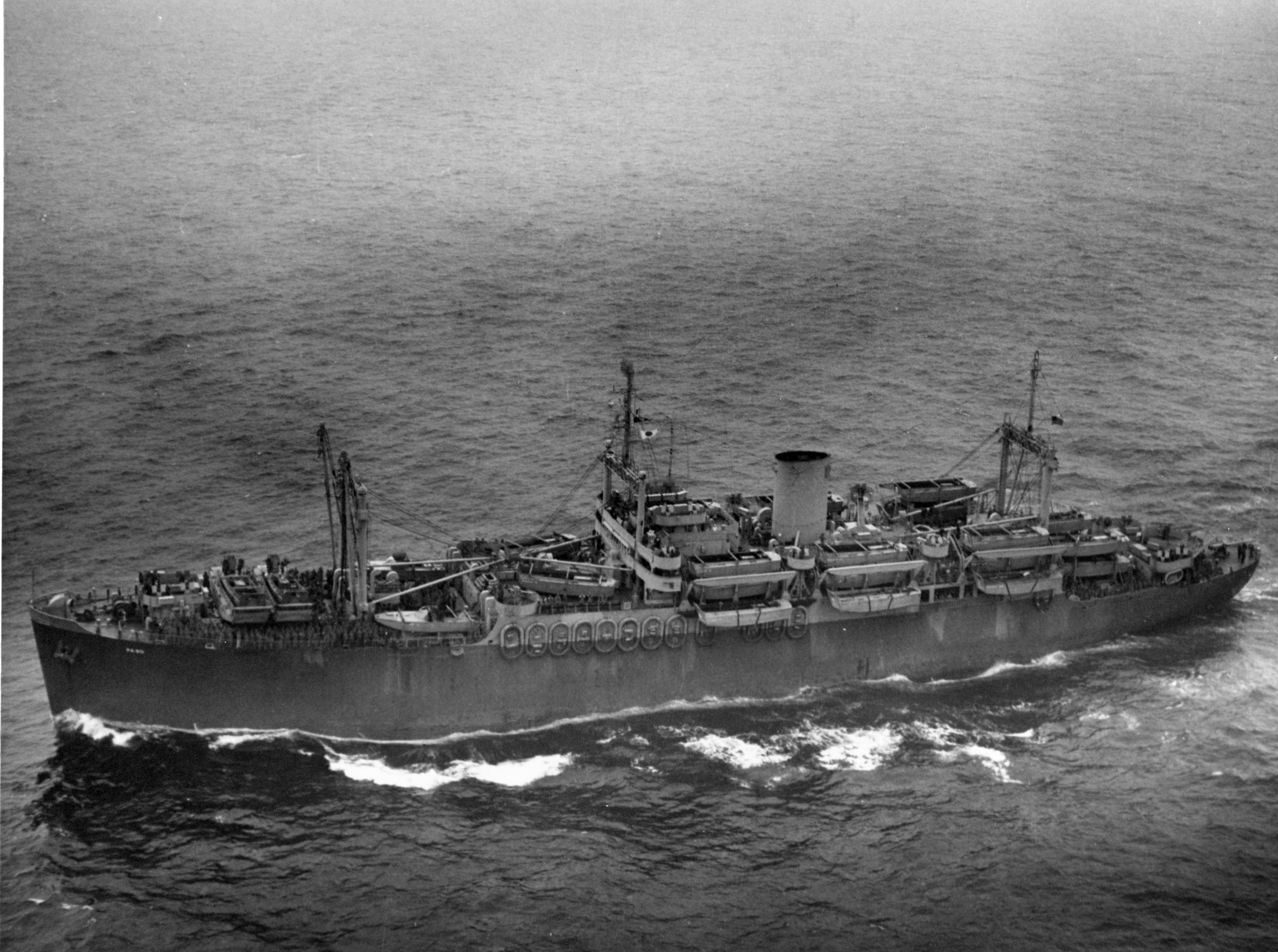
Attack transport James O'Hara

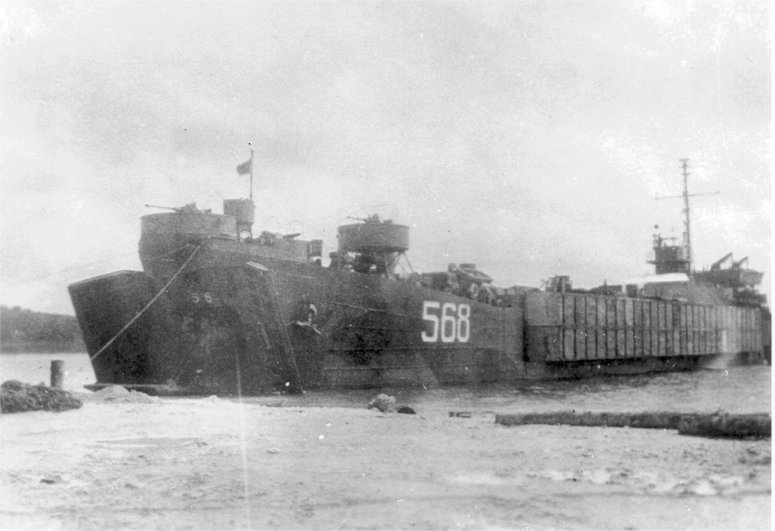
Landing ship tank

Rear Admiral Daniel E. Barbey in amphibious command ship Blue Ridge
Embarking X Army Corps under Maj. Gen. Franklin C. Sibert

Palo Attack Group (Task Group 78.1): Left beaches
Rear Admiral Barbey
Embarking 24th Infantry ("Taro") Division under Maj. Gen. Frederick A. Irving

Transport Unit (Capt. T.B. Brittain)

Transport Division 24 (Capt. Brittain)

4 attack transports: DuPage, Fuller, Elmore, Wayne
1 transport: John Land
1 attack cargo ship: Aquarius
1 landing ship dock: Gunston Hall

Transport Division 6 (Capt. H.D. Baker)

3 attack transports: Fayette, Ormsby, Leedstown
1 attack cargo ship: Titania
1 cargo ship: Hercules
2 landing ship docks: Epping Forest, Carter Hall

Screen (Capt. Henry Crommelin)

4 destroyers

All Fletcher-class (5 × 5-in. main battery): John Rodgers, Murray, Harrison, McKee

Control and Close Support Unit (Capt. N.D. Brantly)

4 submarine chasers: 3 steel hull, 1 wooden hull
16 landing craft infantry: 9 standard, 5 rocket, 2 gunboat
3 patrol craft escort
1 frigate
3 landing ships medium
2 fleet tugs: Apache, Quapaw

San Ricardo Attack Group (Task Group 78.2): Right beaches
Rear Admiral W.M. Fechteler in attack transport Fremont
Embarking 1st Cavalry Division under Maj. Gen. Verne D. Mudge

Transport Unit (Capt. M.O. Carlson)

Transport Division 32 (Capt. Carlson)

4 attack transports: Harris, Barnstable
1 transport: Herald of the Morning
1 attack cargo ship: Arneb
1 landing ship dock: White Marsh

Transport Division 20 (Capt. D.W. Loomis)

3 attack transports: Leonard Wood, Pierce, James O'Hara
1 transport: La Salle
1 attack cargo ship: Electra
1 landing ship dock: Oak Hill
9 landing ships medium

Screen (Capt. A.E. Jarrell)

4 destroyers

3 Fletcher-class (5 × 5-in. main battery): Fletcher, Jenkins, La Vallette
1 Sims-class (4 × 5-in. main battery): Anderson

1 fleet tug: Sonoma
8 landing craft infantry: 6 rocket, 2 gunboat
14 landing ships tank

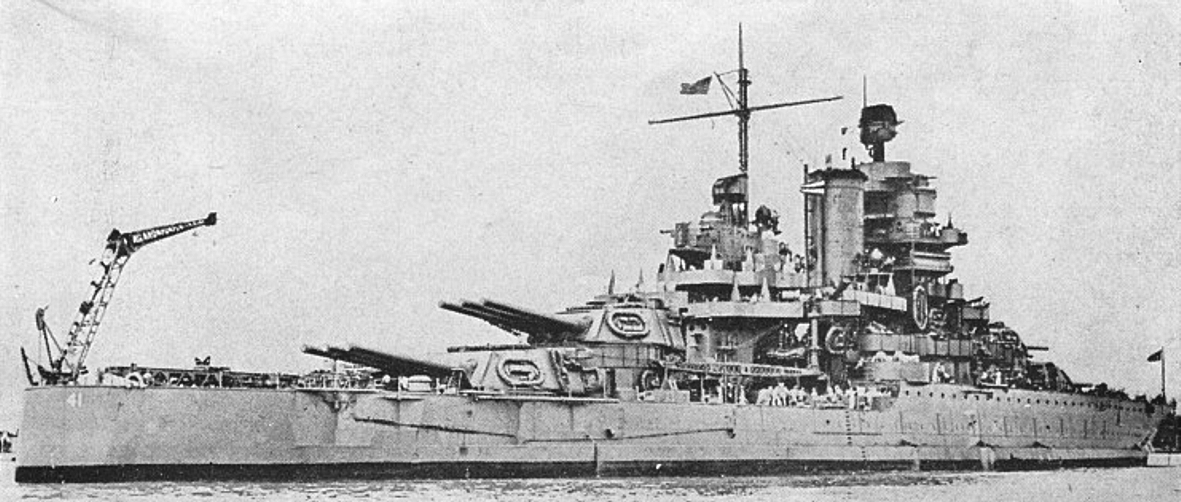
Battleship Mississippi

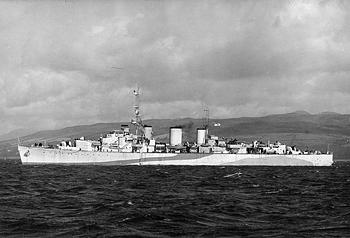
Minelayer HMS Ariadne

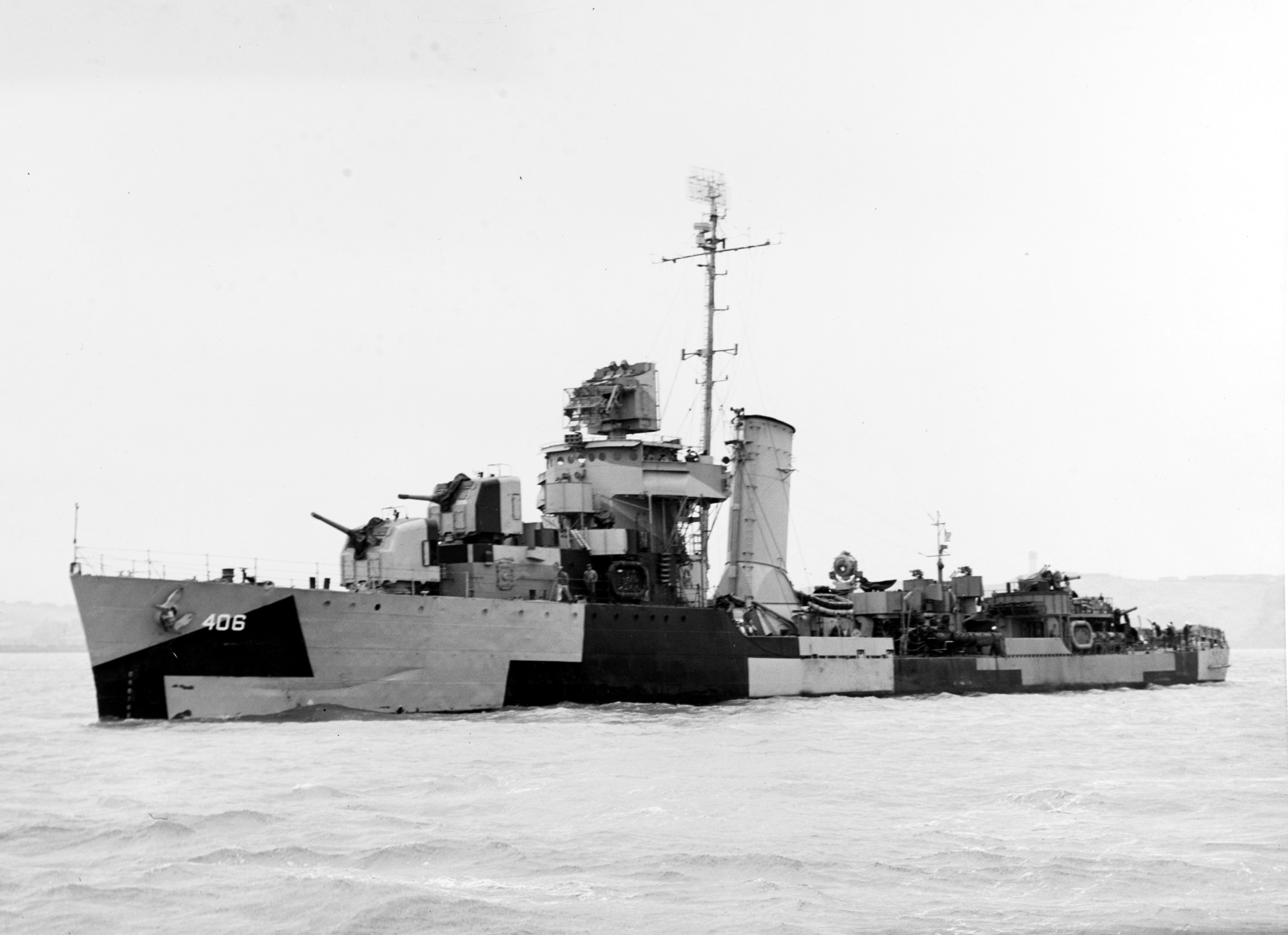
Destroyer Stack

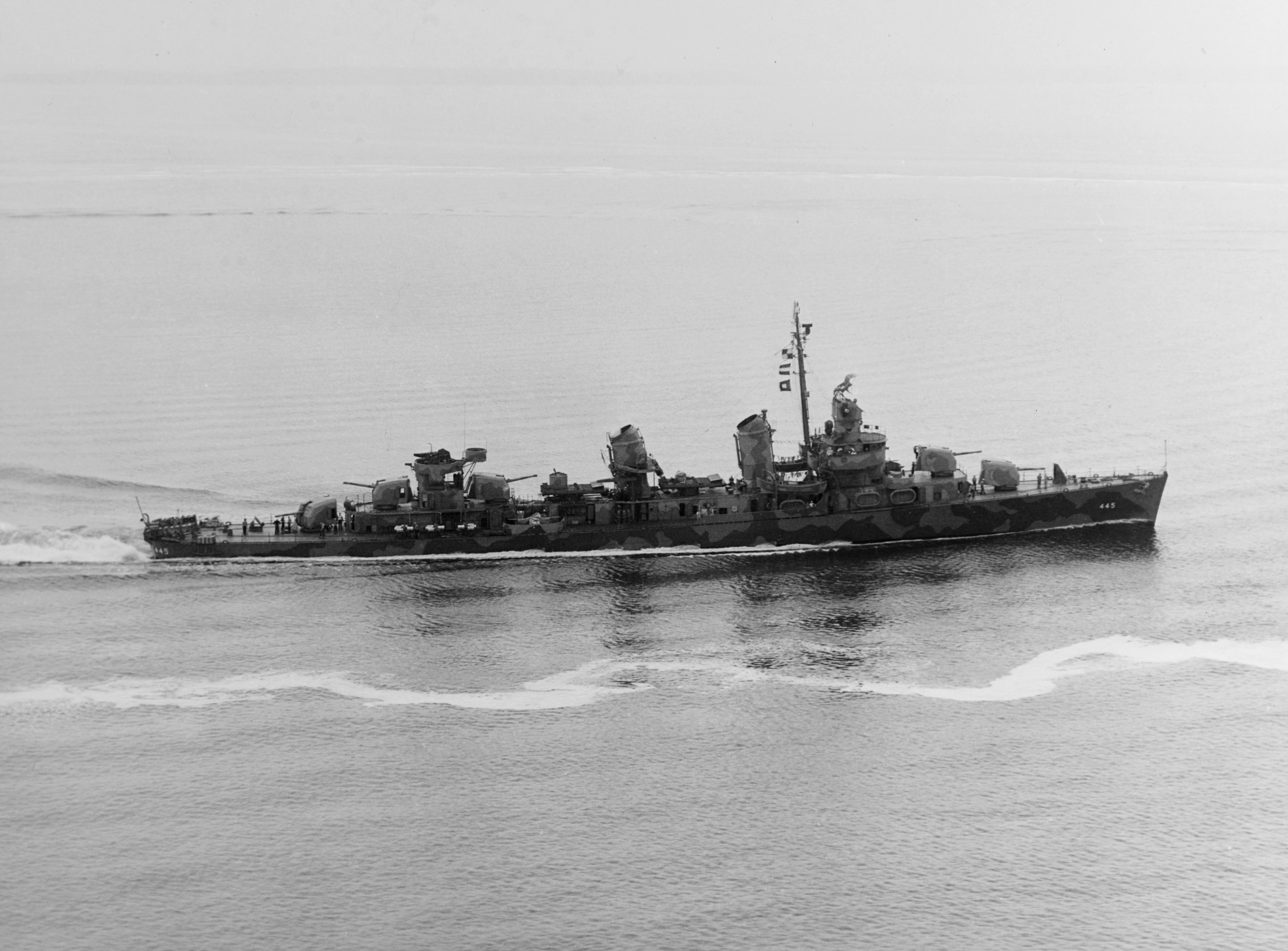
Fletcher-class destroyer

Fire Support Unit North (Rear Adm. George L. Weyler)

3 old battleships

2 Colorado-class (8 × 16-in. main battery): Maryland, West Virginia
1 New Mexico-class (12 × 14-in. main battery): Mississippi

3 destroyers

All Fletcher-class (5 × 5-in. main battery): Cony, Aulick, Sigourney

Panaon Attack Group (Task Group 78.3)
Rear Admiral A.D. Struble in Hughes
Embarking 21st Regimental Combat Team / 24th Infantry Division

3 landing ships infantry: Kanimbla, Manoora, Westralia
4 Fletcher-class destroyers (5 × 5-in. main battery): Sigsbee, Ringgold, Schroeder, Dashiell
1 Sims-class destroyer (4 × 5-in. main battery): Hughes
1 minelayer: Ariadne

Dinagat Attack Group (Task Group 78.4)
Rear Admiral Struble in Hughes
Embarking 6th Ranger Battalion and Co. B / 21st Infantry

5 fast transports: (all ex-Wickes-class destroyers): Kilty, Schley, Ward, Herbert, Crosby
2 Benham-class destroyers (4 × 5-in. main battery): Lang, Stack
2 Tacoma-class frigates (3 × 3-in. main battery): Gallup, Bisbee
1 fleet tug: Chickasaw

Reinforcement Group One (Task Group 78.6)
Captain S.P. Jenkins
Arriving 22 October

Amphibious assault vessels

6 attack transports: Crescent City, Warren, Windsor, Callaway, Leon, Sumter
1 transport: Storm King
1 cargo ship: Jupiter
1 repair ship: Achilles
4 merchant ships
32 landing ships tank
12 landing craft infantry

Escort (Capt. E.A. Solomons)

4 destroyers

2 Fletcher-class (5 × 5-in. main battery): Stevens, Howorth
2 Sims-class (4 × 5-in. main battery): Mustin, Morris

2 frigates

Both Tacoma-class (3 × 3-in. main battery): Carson City, Burlington

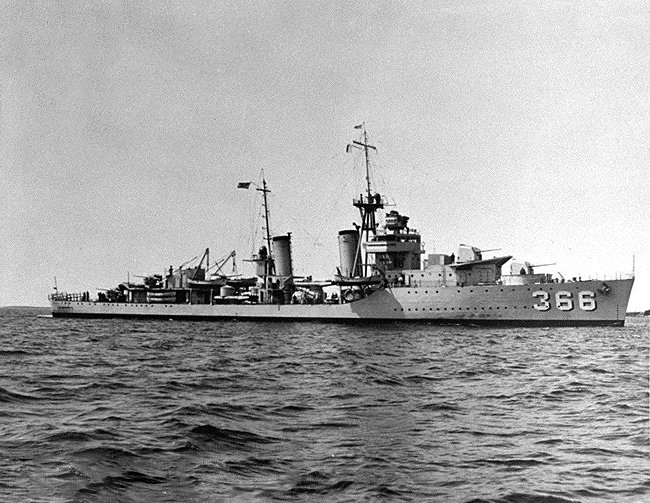
Destroyer Drayton

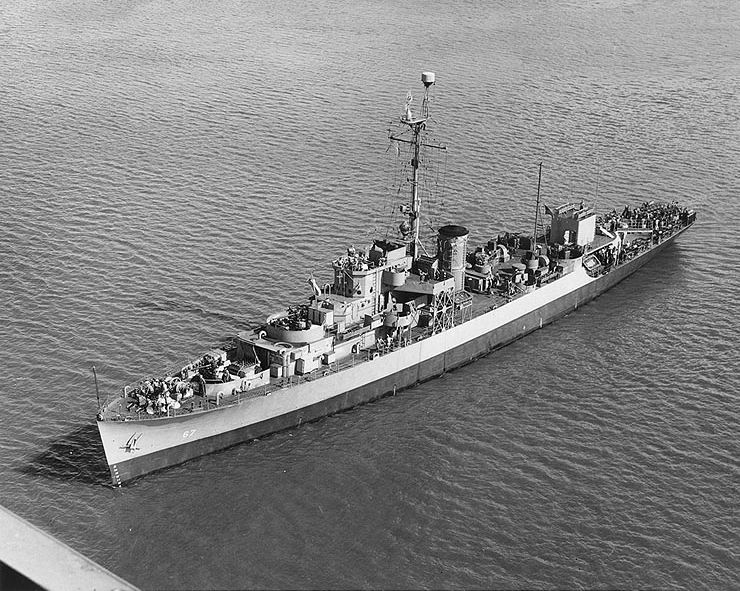
Tacoma-class frigate

Reinforcement Group Two (Task Group 78.7)
Captain J.K.B. Ginder
Arriving 24 October

Amphibious assault vessels

32 landing ships tank
24 merchant ships

Escort (Capt. Ginder)

4 destroyers

All Fletcher-class (5 × 5-in. main battery): Nicholas, O'Bannon, Taylor, Hopewell

2 frigates

Both Tacoma-class (3 × 3-in. main battery): Muskogee, San Pedro

Reinforcement Group Three (Task Group 78.9)
Commander J.L. Steinmetz, USCG
Arriving 29 October

Amphibious assault vessels

62 landing ships tank
19 merchant ships

Escort (Capt. W.M. Cole)

5 destroyers

All Mahan-class (5 × 5-in. main battery): Mahan, Drayton, Lamson, Flusser, Smith

4 frigates

All Tacoma-class (3 × 3-in. main battery): Eugene, El Paso, Van Buren, Orange

==== Southern Attack Force (Task Force 79) ====
Amphibious force commanders for
Southern Landing Area

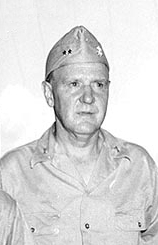
Vice Adm. Theodore S. Wilkinson

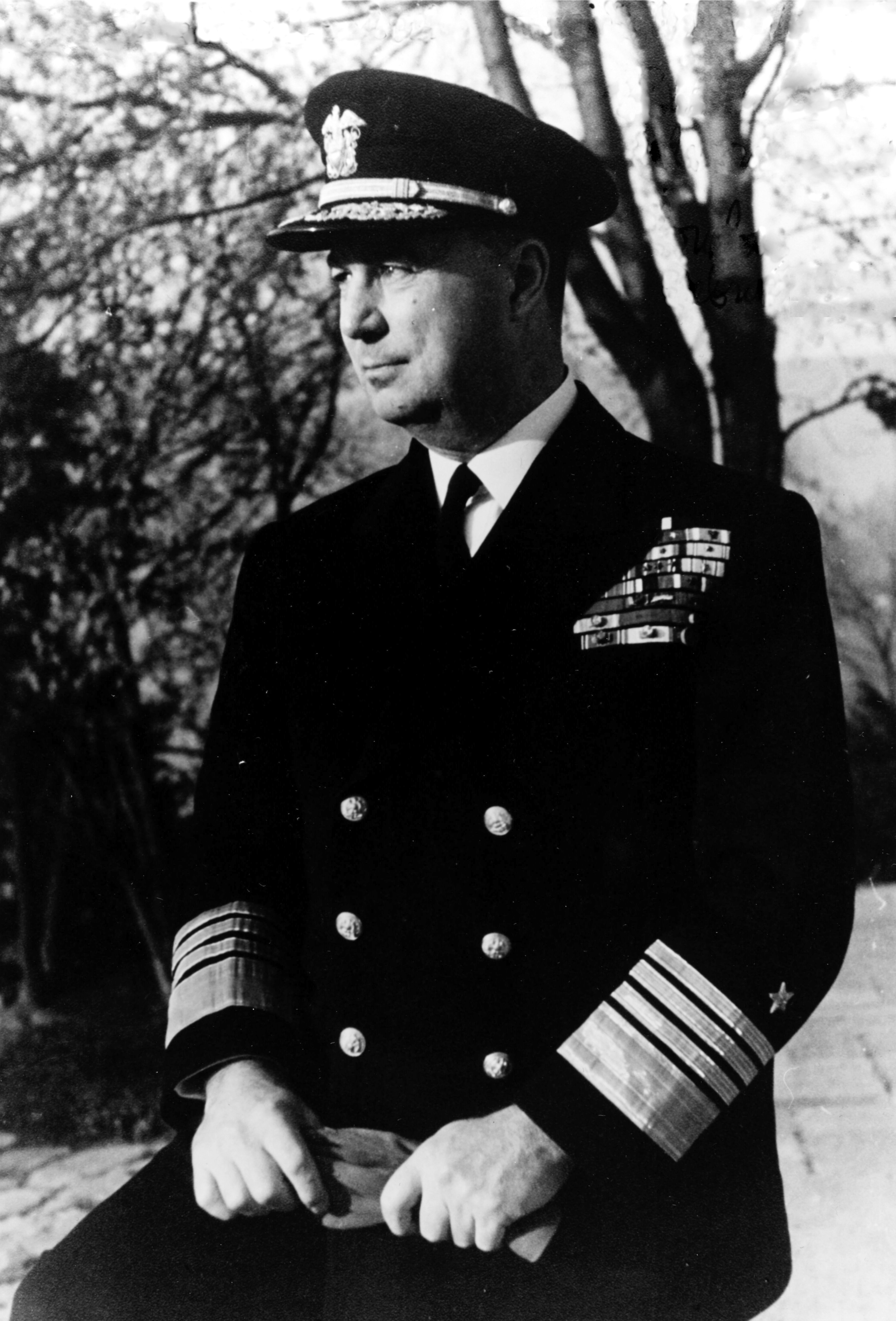
Richard L. Conolly as a vice admiral

Amphibious command ships

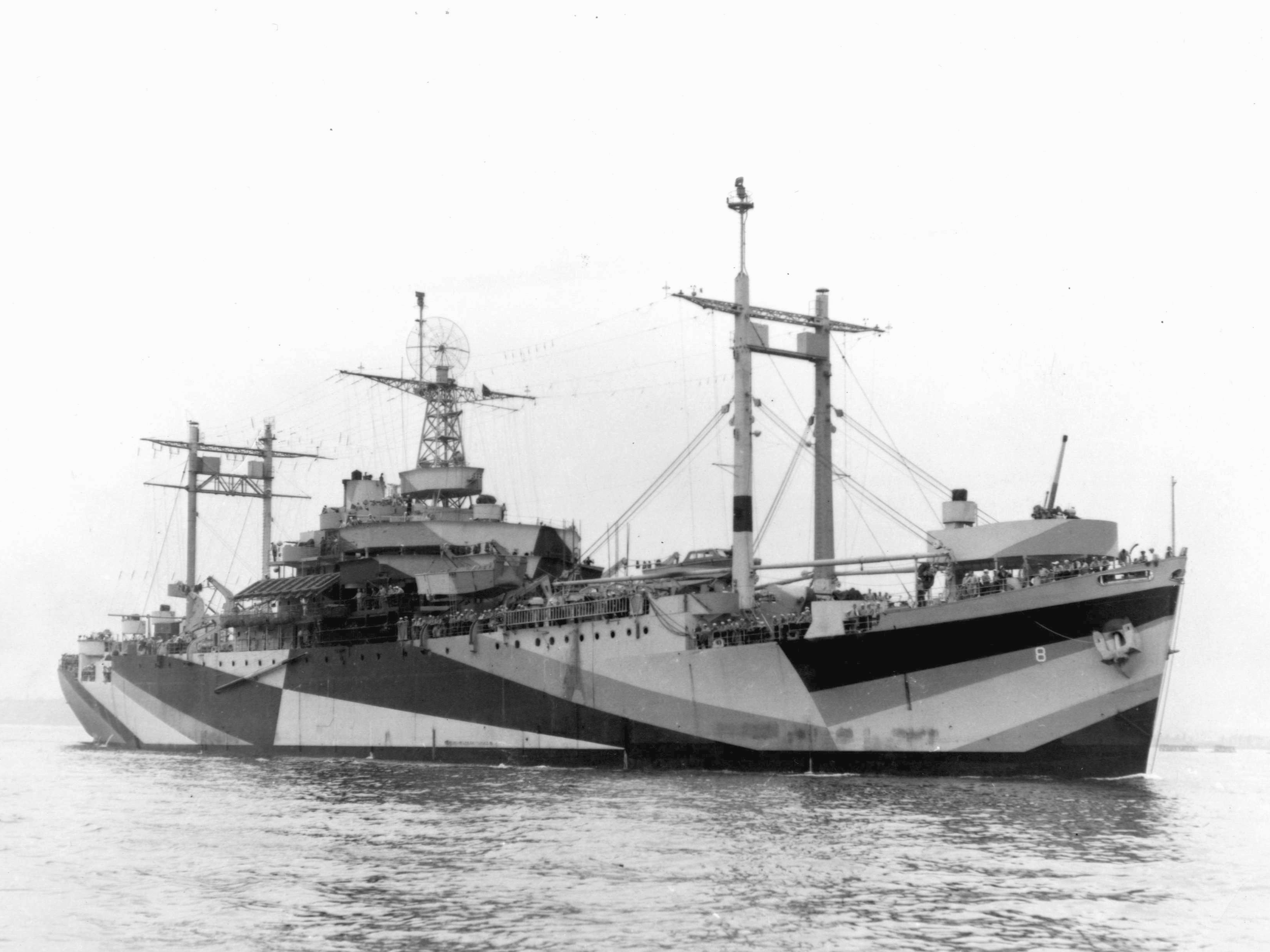
Mount Olympus (Vice Adm. Wilkinson)

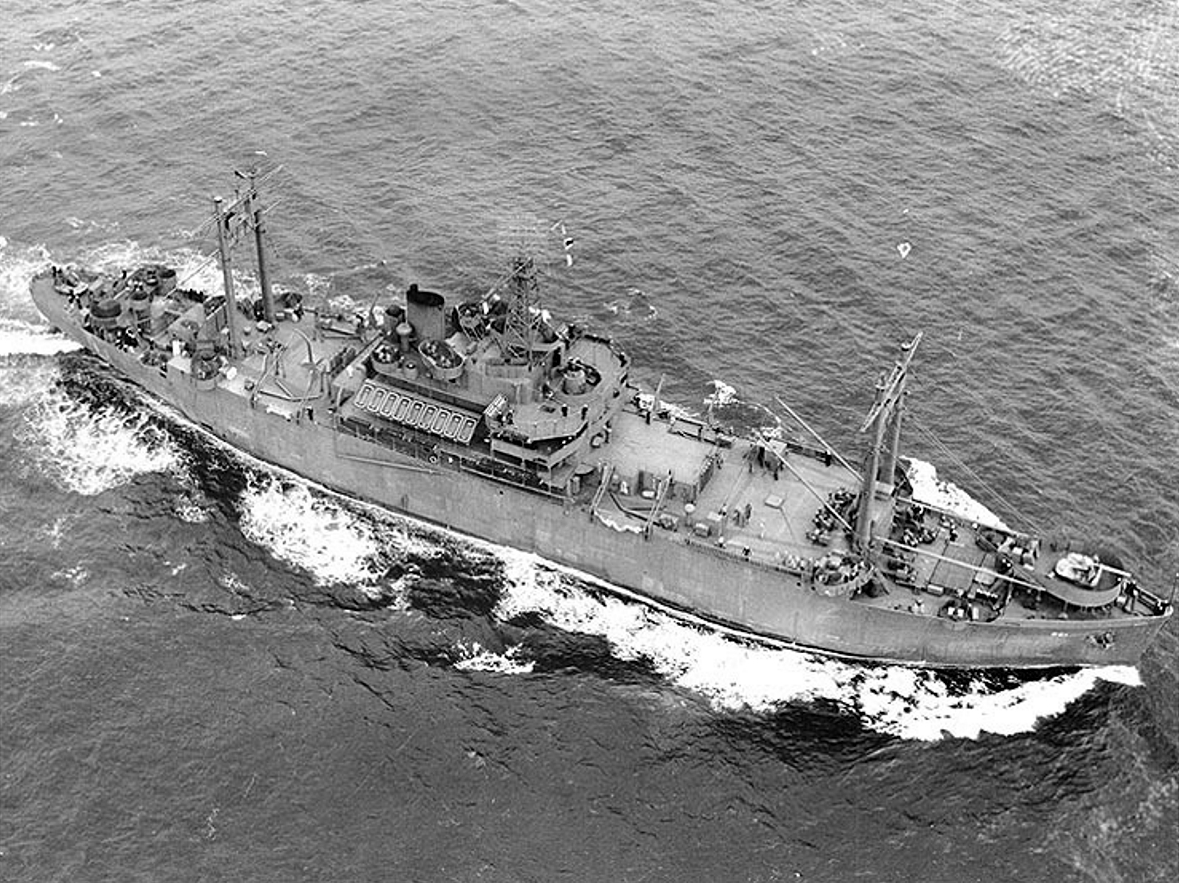
Appalachian (Rear Adm. Conolly)

Vice Admiral Theodore S. Wilkinson in amphibious command ship Mount Olympus
Embarking XXIV Army Corps under Lieut. Gen. John R. Hodge

Attack Group "Able" (Task Group 79.1): Left beaches
Rear Admiral Richard L. Conolly in amphibious command ship Appalachian
Embarking 7th Infantry "Bayonet" Division under Maj. Gen. Archibald V. Arnold

Transport Group "Able" (Task Group 79.3)
Captain C.G. Richardson

Transport Division 7 (Capt. Richardson)

3 attack transports: Cavalier, J. Franklin Bell, Feland
1 transport: Golden City
1 attack cargo ship: Thuban
1 landing ship dock: Lindenwald

Transport Division 30 (Capt. C.A. Mission)

3 attack transports: Knox, Calvert, Custer
1 evacuation transport: Rixey
1 attack cargo ship: Chara
1 landing ship dock: Ashland

Transport Division 38 (Capt. Charles Allen)

3 attack transports: Lamar, Alpine, Heywood
2 transports: Starlight, Monitor
1 attack cargo ships: Alshain

Transport Division "X-Ray" (Capt. J.A. Snackenberg)

2 attack transports: George Clymer, President Hayes
1 cargo ship: Mercury

Screen (Capt. W.J. Marshall)

8 destroyers

All Fletcher-class (5 × 5-in. main battery): Erben, Walker, Hale, Abbot, Black, Chauncey, Braine, Gansevoort

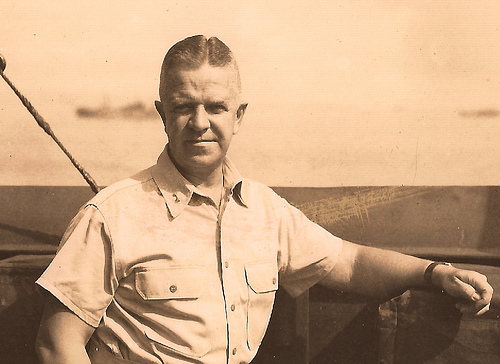
Rear Adm. Forrest B. Royal

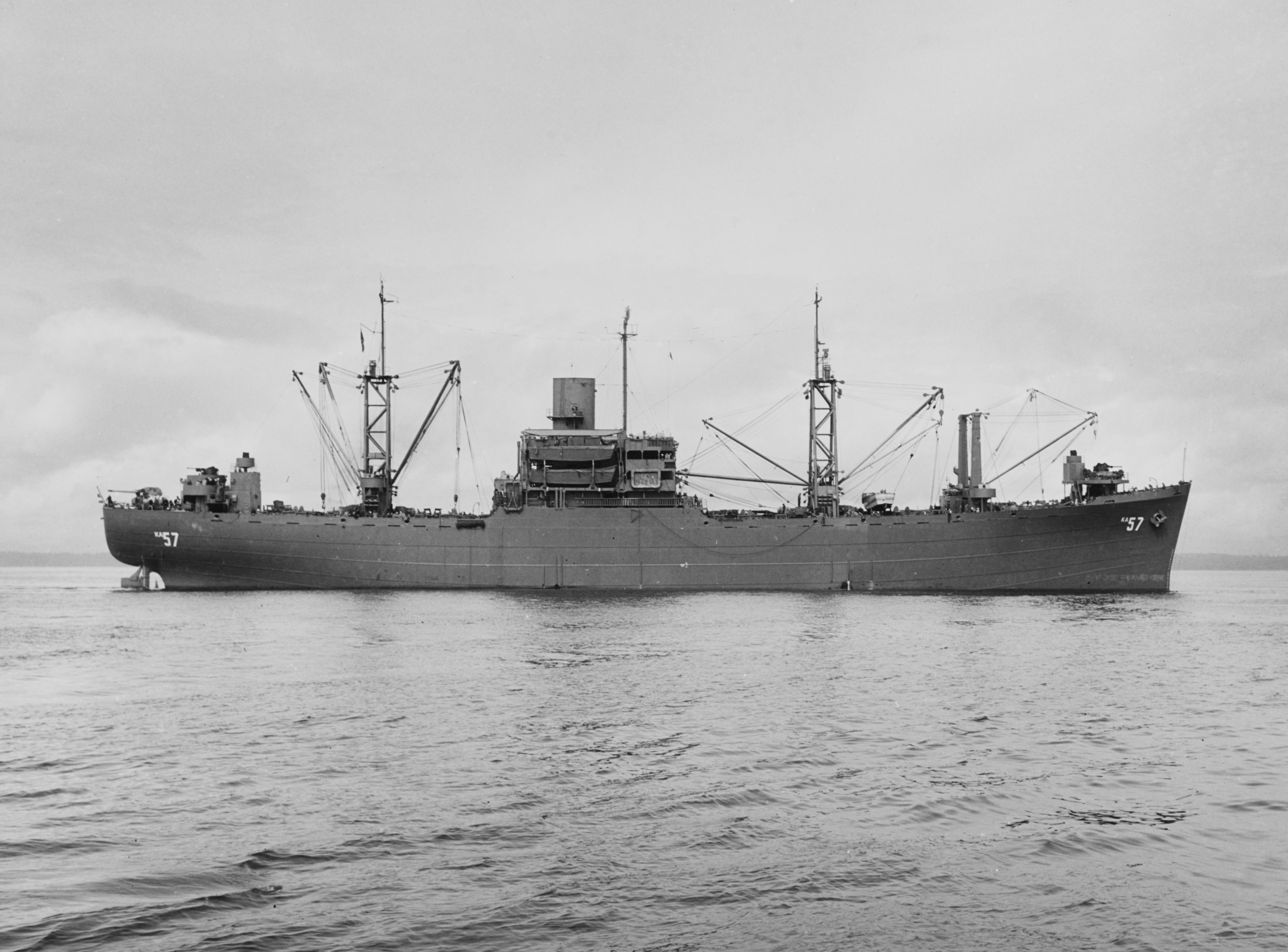
Attack cargo ship Capricornus

Attack Group "Baker" (Task Group 79.2): Right beaches
Rear Admiral Forrest B. Royal (Note: Died of a heart attack on board his flagship Rocky Mount off Borneo, June 1945.)
Embarking 96th Infantry ("Deadeye") Division under Maj. Gen. James L. Bradley

TG 79.4 Transport Group "Baker" (Task Group 79.4)
Capt. H.B. Knowles

Transport Division 10 (Capt. G.D. Morrison)

4 attack transports: Clay, Arthur Middleton, Baxter, William P. Biddle
1 transport: George F. Elliott
1 attack cargo ship: Capricornus
1 landing ship vehicle: Catskill

Transport Division 18 (Capt. Knowles)

3 attack transports: Cambria, Monrovia, Frederick Funston
1 transport: War Hawk
1 attack cargo ship: Alcyone
2 landing ship docks: Casa Grande, Rushmore

Transport Division 28 (Capt. H.C. Flanagan)

3 attack transports: Bolivar, Sheridan, Doyen
1 transport: Comet
1 attack cargo ship: Almaack
1 landing ship dock: Belle Grove

Screen (Capt. E.R. McLean)

9 destroyers

8 Fletcher-class (5 × 5-in. main battery): Picking, Sproston, Wickes, Isherwood, Charles J. Badger, Halligan, Haraden, Twiggs
1 Farragut-class (4 × 5-in. main battery): MacDonough

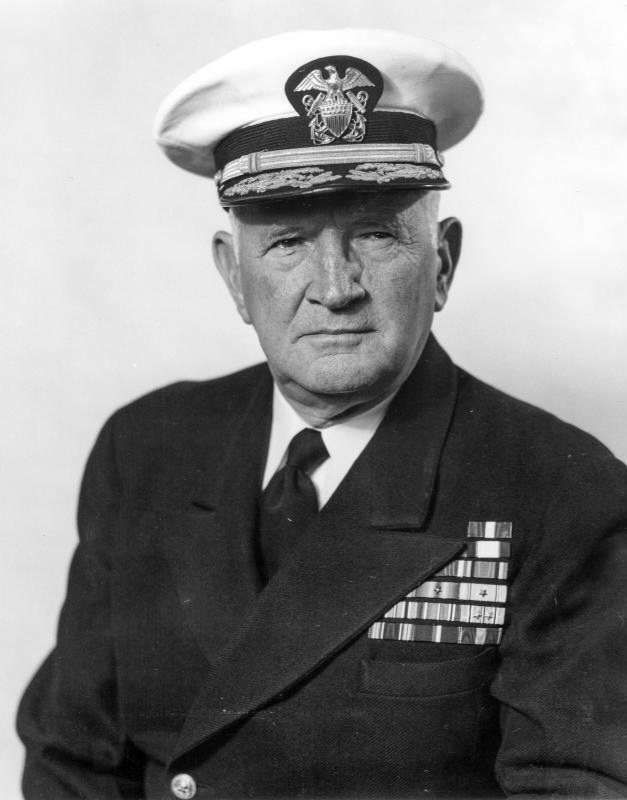
Rear Adm. Jesse B. Oldendorf

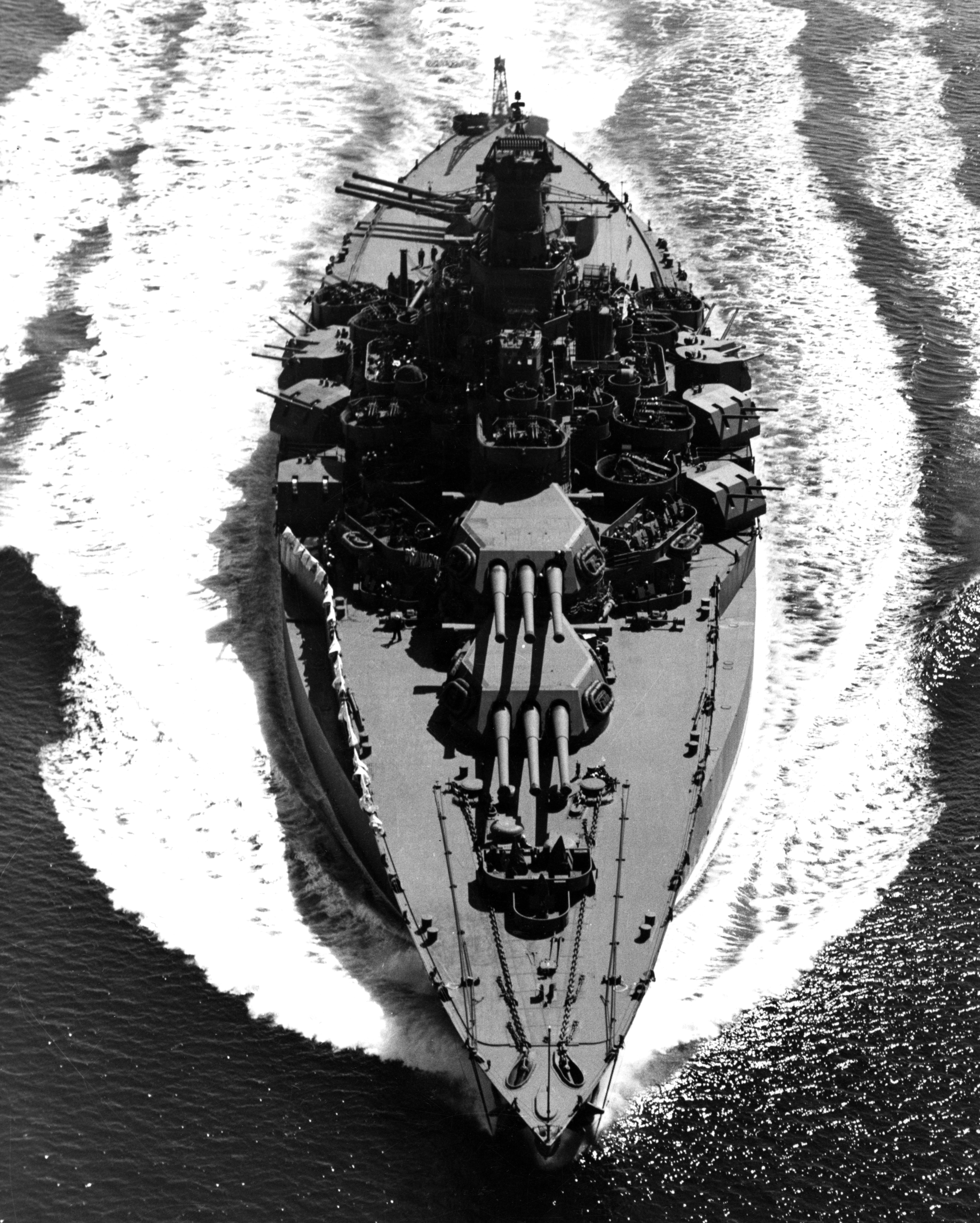
Battleship Tennessee underway

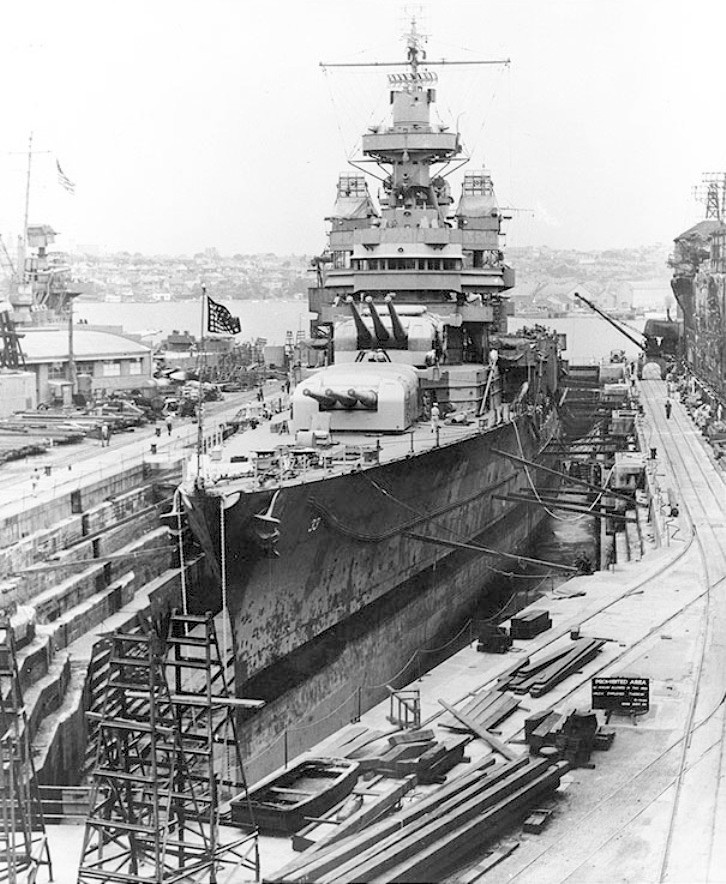
Heavy cruiser Portland in drydock

Fire Support Unit South
Rear Admiral Jesse B. Oldendorf in heavy cruiser Louisville

Battleship Division 2 (Rear Adm. Theodore E. Chandler)

3 old battleships

2 Tennessee-class (12 × 14-in. main battery): Tennessee, California
1 Pennsylvania-class (12 × 14-in. main battery): Pennsylvania

Cruiser Division 4 (Rear Adm. Oldendorf)

3 heavy cruisers

1 New Orleans-class (9 × 8-in. main battery): Minneapolis
1 Portland-class (9 × 8-in. main battery): Portland
1 Northampton-class (9 × 8-in. main battery): Louisville

Cruiser Division 9 (Rear Adm. Walden L. Ainsworth)

1 light cruiser

1 Brooklyn-class (15 × 6-in. main battery): Honolulu

Cruiser Division 12 (Rear Adm. Robert W. Hayler)

2 light cruisers

Both Cleveland-class (12 × 6-in. main battery): Denver, Columbia

Screen (Capt. Roland N. Smoot)

13 destroyers

11 Fletcher-class (5 × 5-in. main battery): Leutze, Newcomb, Bennion, Heywood L. Edwards, Richard P. Leary, Robinson, Ross, Albert W. Grant, Bryant, Halford, Claxton
2 Gleaves-class (4 × 5-in. main battery): Thorn, Welles

=== Service and Support Units ===
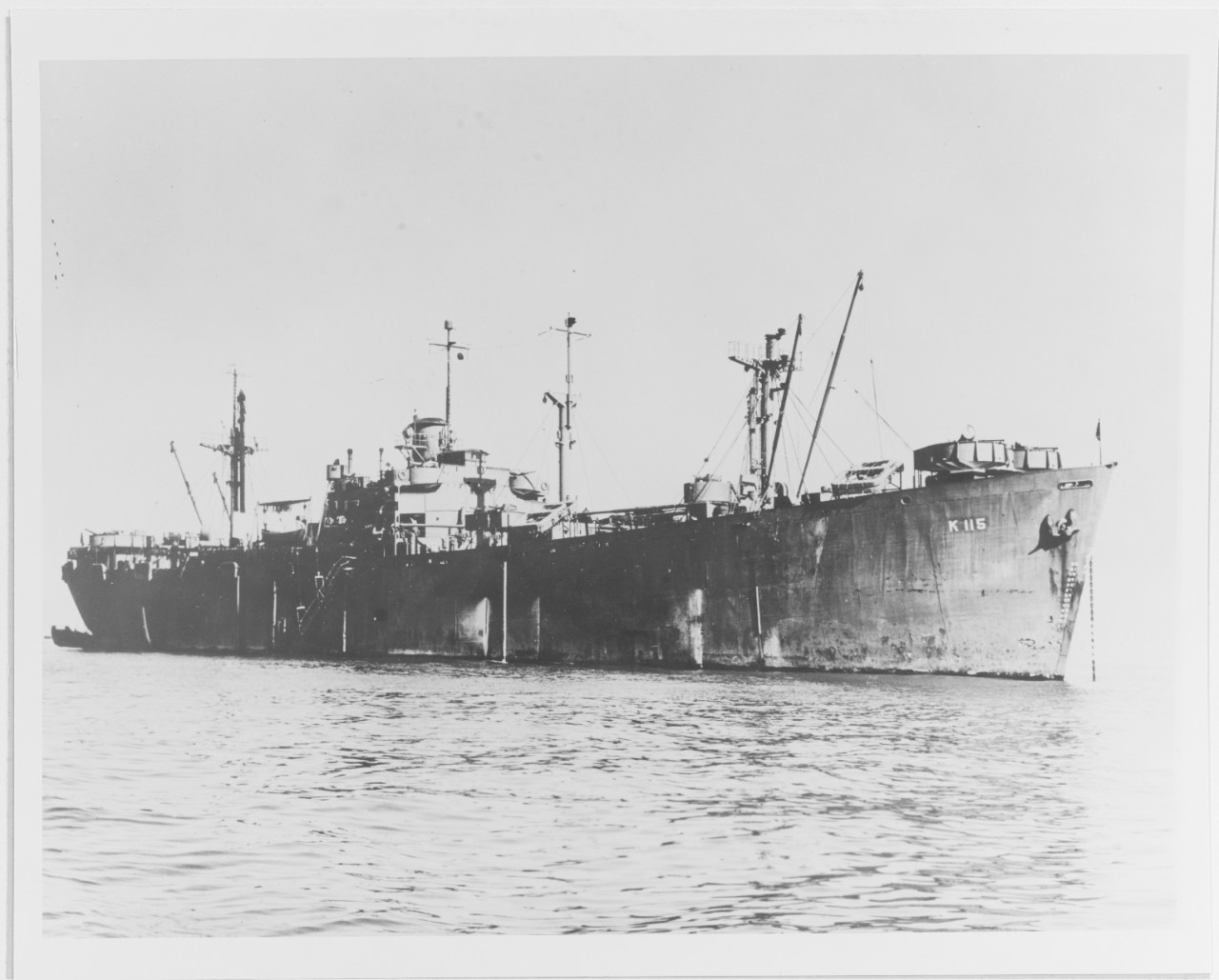
Provision ship Crux

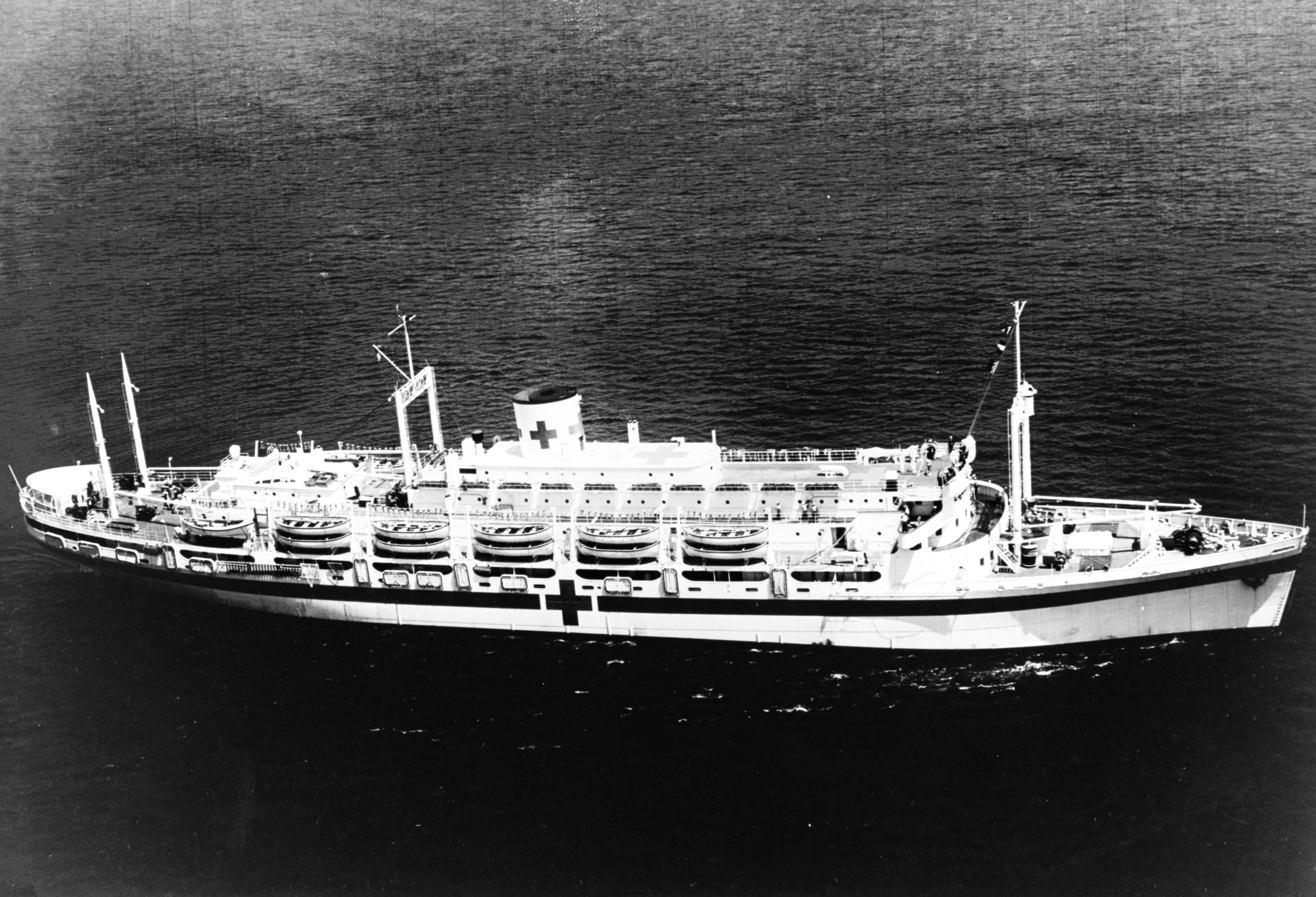
Hospital ship Mercy

==== Service Force Seventh Fleet (Task Group 77.7) ====
Rear Admiral R.O. Glover

Fueling at Sea Unit (Capt. J.D. Beard)

7 oilers: Saranac, Ashtabula, Salamonie, Suamico, Kishwaukee, Schuylkill, Tallulah
5 ammunition ships: Mazama, Durham Victory, Iran Victory, Bluefield Victory, Canada Victory

Escort Unit (Cmdr. F.W. Howers)

3 Buckley-class destroyer escorts (3 × 3-in. main battery): Whitehurst, Witter, Bowers

Leyte Gulf Unit (Capt. E.P. Hylant)

6 tankers: Arethusa, Caribou, Mink, Panda, Porcupine, Bishopdale
1 water tanker: Severn
4 net tenders: Indus, Teak, Silverbell, Satinleaf
3 repair and salvage vessels: Achilles, Cable, Midas
1 floating dry dock: ARD-19
3 ammunition ships: Murzim, Poyang, Yunnan
9 provision ships: Arequipa, Calamaries, Mizar, Octane, Crux, Ganymede, Triangulum, Pollux, Acubens, Merkur
2 hospital ships: Mercy, Comfort

== US Third Fleet ==
Third Fleet and Fast Carrier commanders

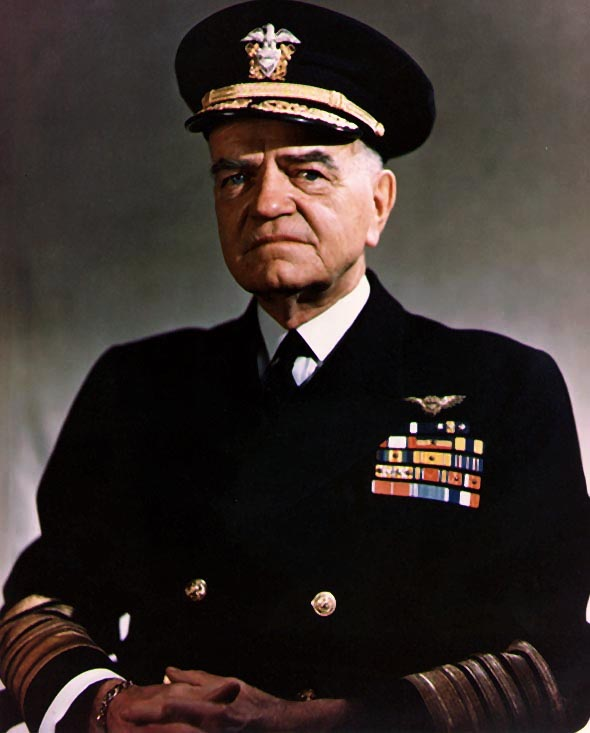
Admiral William F. Halsey, Jr.

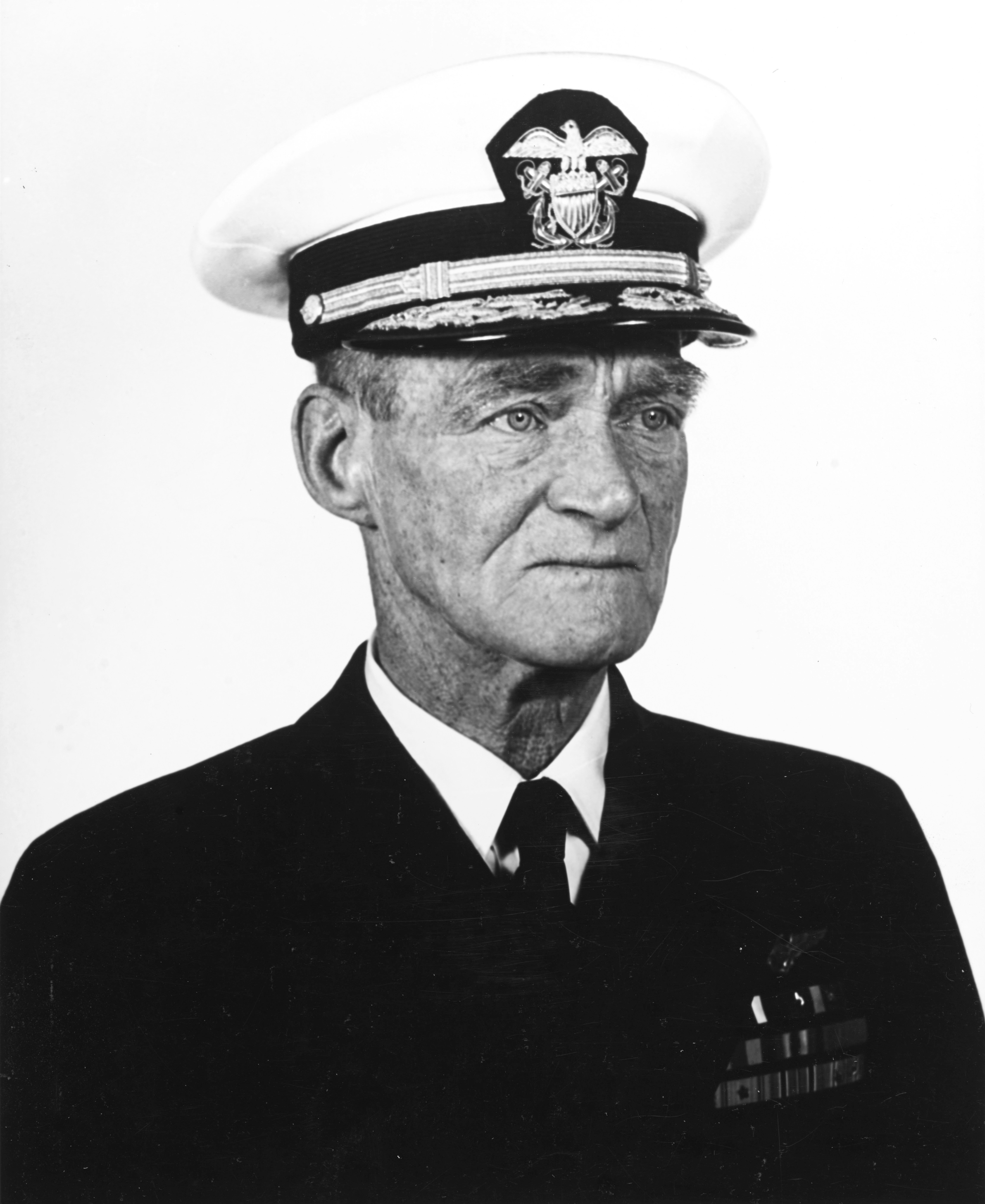
Vice Adm. Marc A. Mitscher

Admiral William F. Halsey in fast battleship New Jersey

=== Fast Carrier Force (Task Force 38) ===
Vice Admiral Marc A. Mitscher in fleet carrier Lexington

==== Task Group 38.1 ====
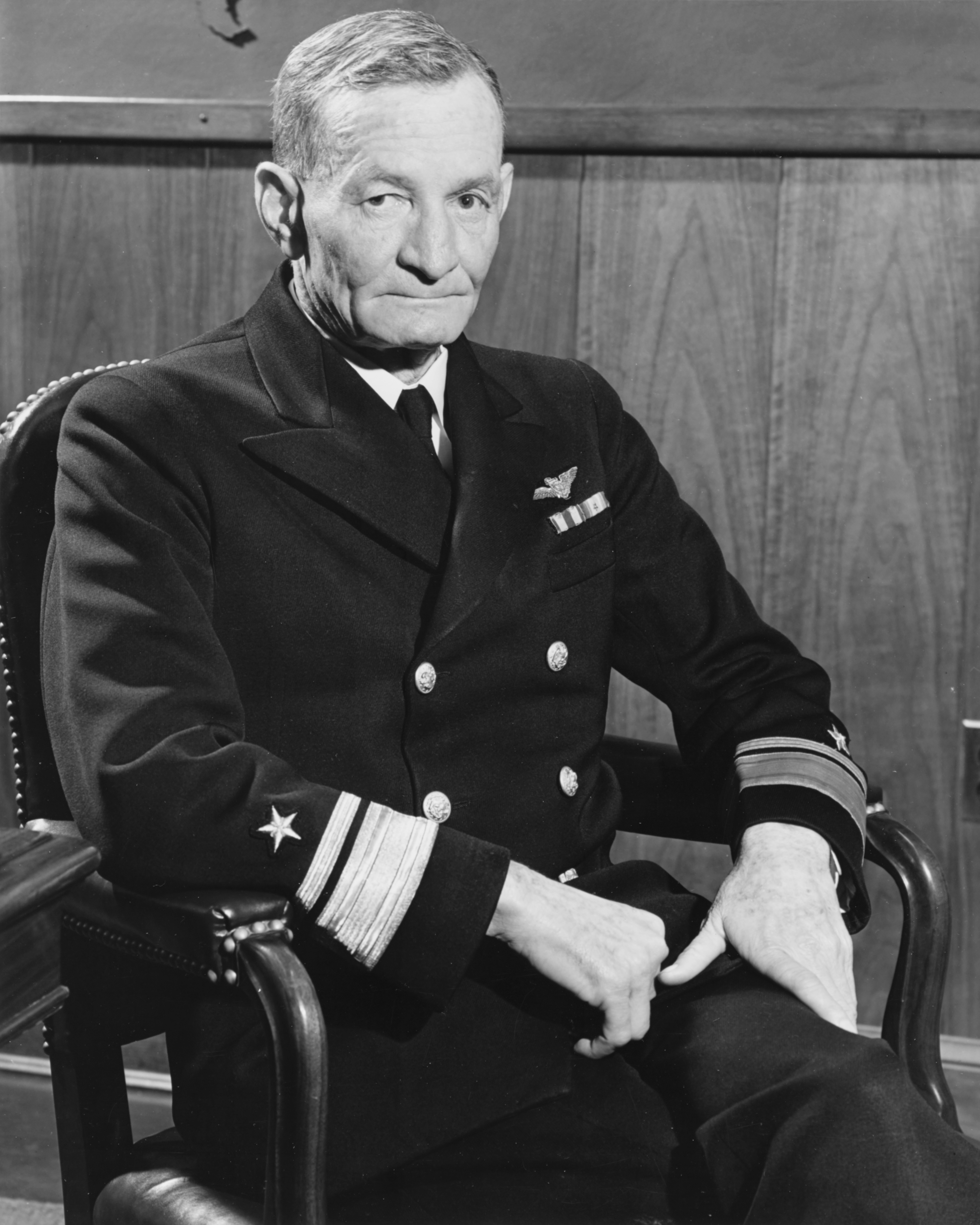
Vice Adm. John S. McCain, Sr.

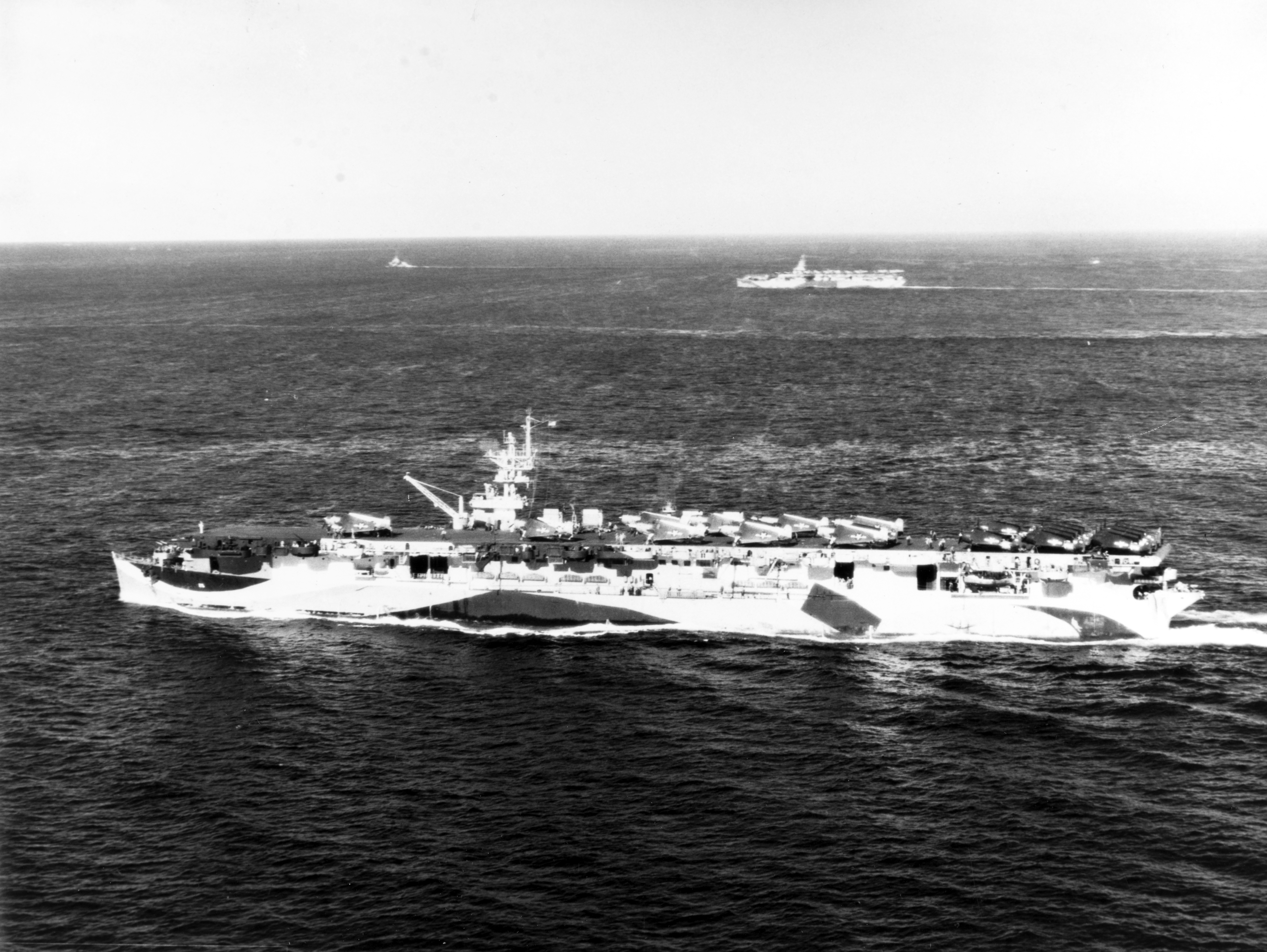
Light carrier Cowpens

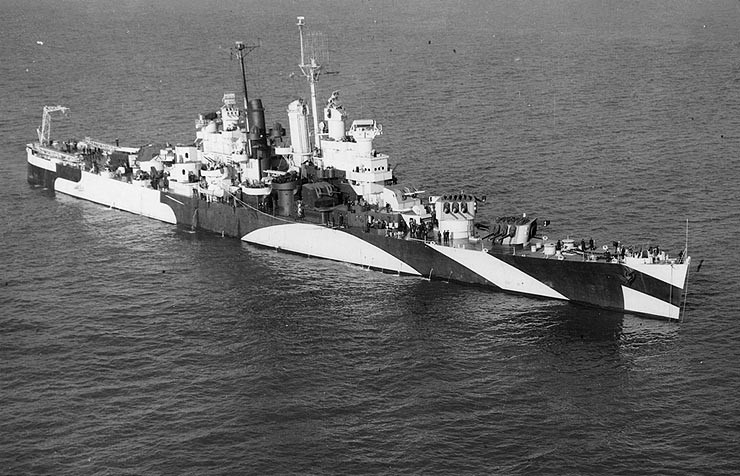
Light cruiser Houston in dazzle camouflage

Vice Admiral John S. McCain Sr. (Note: Grandfather of Vietnam War veteran and officeholder John McCain)

2 fleet carriers

Hornet (Capt. Austin K. Doyle)

Air Group 11 (Cmdr. F.R. Schrader)

VF-11: 33 F6F Hellcat fighters, 4 F6F-xN Hellcat night fighters
VB-11: 25 SB2C Helldiver dive bombers
VT-11: 1 TBF Avenger, 17 TBM Avenger torpedo bombers

Wasp (Capt. O.A. Weller)

Air Group 14 (Cmdr. W.C. Wingard)

VF-14: 38 F6F Hellcat fighters, 4 F6F-xN Hellcat night fighters
VB-14: 10 F6F Hellcat fighters, 25 SB2C Helldiver dive bombers
VT-14: 6 TBF Avenger, 12 TBM Avenger torpedo bombers

2 light carriers

Monterey (Capt. Stuart H. Ingersoll)

Air Group 28 (Lt. Cmdr. R.W. Mehle)

VF-28: 23 F6F Hellcat fighters
VT-28: 9 TBM Avenger torpedo bombers

Cowpens (Capt. H.W. Taylor)

Air Group 22 (Lt. Cmdr. T.H. Jenkins)

VF-22: 26 F6F Hellcat fighters
VT-22: 9 TBM Avenger torpedo bombers

Cruiser Division 6 (Rear Adm. C. Turner Joy)

1 heavy cruiser (9 × 8-in. main battery)

Wichita

Cruiser Division 10 (Rear Adm. Lloyd J. Wiltse)

1 heavy cruiser

Baltimore-class (9 × 8-in. main battery): Boston

1 light cruiser

Cleveland-class (12 × 6-in. main battery): Houston

Screen (Capt. C.F. Espe)

15 destroyers

12 Fletcher-class (5 × 5-in. main battery): Izard, Charrette, Conner, Bell, Burns, Cogswell, Caperton, Ingersoll, Knapp, Boyd, Cowell, Brown,
1 Benson-class (4 × 5-in. main battery): Woodworth
2 Gleaves-class (4 × 5-in. main battery): McCalla, Grayson

==== Task Group 38.2 ====
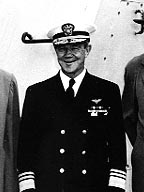
Rear Adm. Gerald F. Bogan

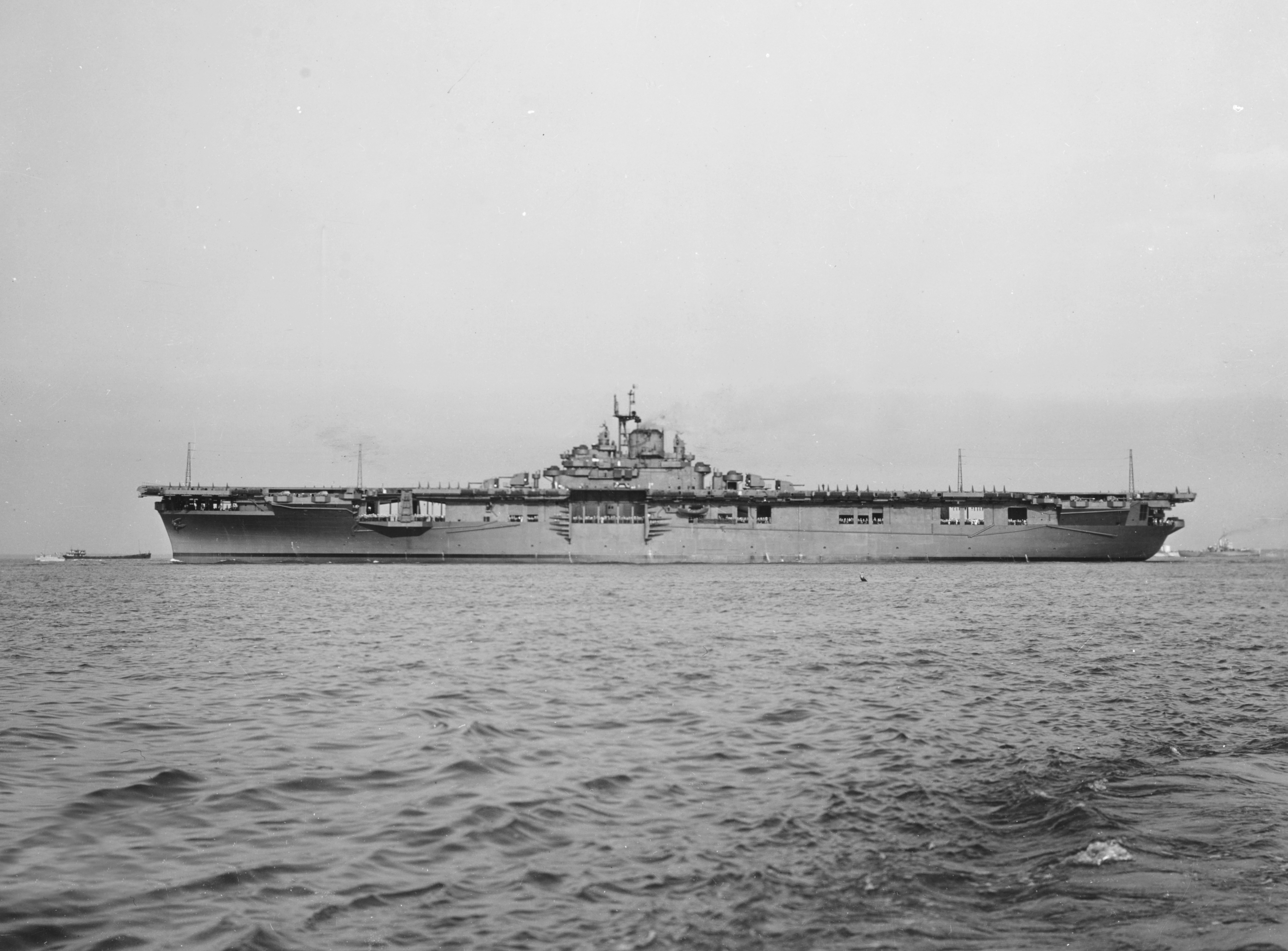
Fleet carrier Intrepid

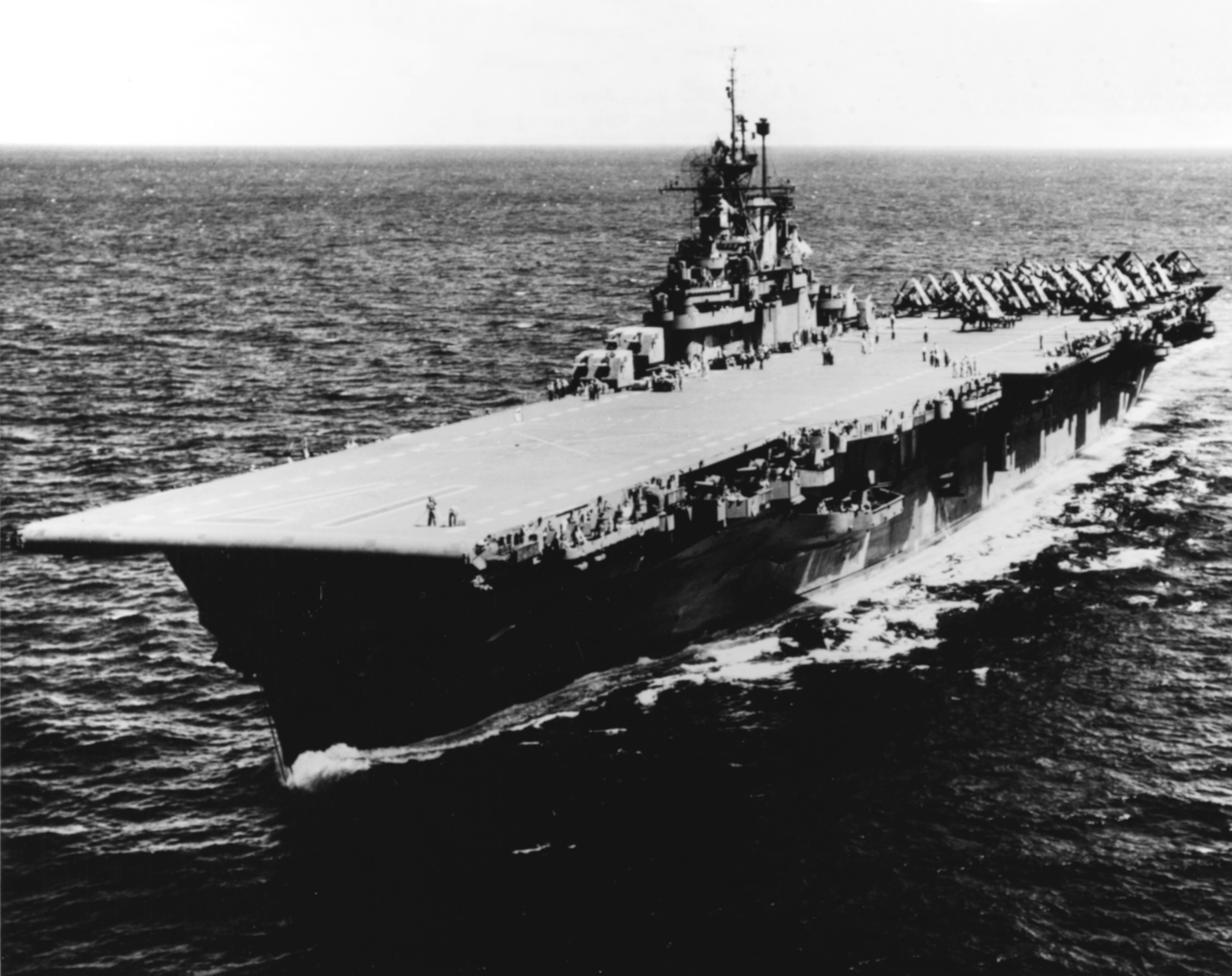
Fleet carrier Bunker Hill

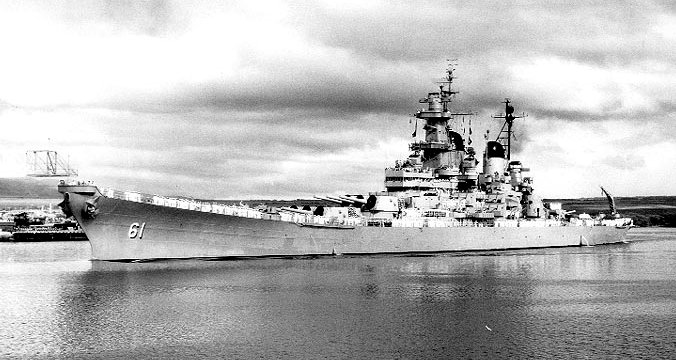
Fast battleship Iowa

Rear Admiral Gerald F. Bogan

3 fleet carriers

Intrepid (Capt. J.F. Bolger)

Air Group 18 (Cmdr. W.E. Ellis)

VF-18: 38 F6F Hellcat fighters, 5 F6F-xN Hellcat night fighters
VB-18: 28 SB2C Helldiver dive bombers
VT-18: 18 TBM Avenger torpedo bombers

Hancock (Capt. F.C. Dickey)

Air Group 7 (Cmdr. J.D. Lamade)

VF-7: 37 F6F Hellcat fighters, 4 F6F-xN Hellcat night fighters
VB-7: 42 SB2C Helldiver dive bombers
VT-7: 18 TBM Avenger torpedo bombers

Bunker Hill (Capt. M.R. Greer)

Air Group 8 (Cmdr. R.L. Shifley)

VF-8: 40 F6F Hellcat fighters, 8 F6F-xN Hellcat night fighters
VB-8: 17 SB2C Helldiver, 3 SBF Helldiver, 4 SBW Helldiver dive bombers
VT-8: 19 TBM Avenger torpedo bombers

2 light carriers

Cabot (Capt. S.J. Michael)

Air Group 29 (Lt. Cmdr. W.E. Eder)

VF-29: 21 F6F Hellcat fighters
VT-29: 1 TBF Avenger, 8 TBM Avenger torpedo bombers

Independence (Capt. E.C. Ewen)

Night Air Group 41 (Cmdr. T.F. Caldwell)

VFN-41: 5 F6F Hellcat fighters, 14 F6F-xN Hellcat night fighters
VTN-41: 8 TBM Avenger torpedo bombers

Battleship Division 7 (Rear Adm. Oscar C. Badger II)

2 fast battleships

Both Iowa-class (9 × 16-in. main battery): Iowa, New Jersey

Cruiser Division 14 (Rear Adm. Francis E. M. Whiting)

2 light cruisers

Both Cleveland-class (12 × 6-in. main battery): Vincennes, Miami

2 anti-aircraft light cruisers: (Note: These cruisers were intended as destroyer leaders when designed. After the first two to be used in this role, Atlanta and Juneau, were lost at the Naval Battle of Guadalcanal, this mission was abandoned and the anti-aircraft mission adopted.)

Both Atlanta-class: San Diego, Oakland

Screen (Capt. John P. Womble)

18 destroyers

All Fletcher-class (5 × 5-in. main battery): Owen, Miller, The Sullivans, Stephen Potter, Tingey, Hickox, Hunt, Lewis Hancock, Marshall, Halsey Powell, Cushing, Colahan, Uhlmann, Benham, Stockham, Wedderburn, Twining, Yarnall

==== Task Group 38.3 ====
Rear Admiral Frederick C. Sherman

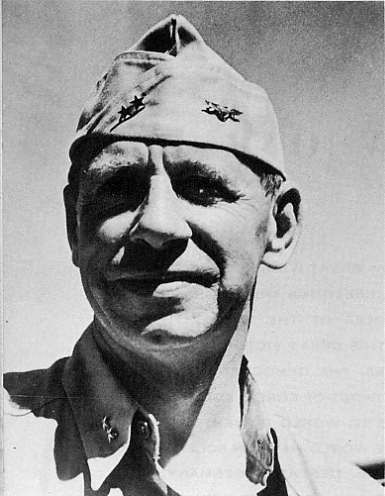
Vice Adm. Frederick C. Sherman

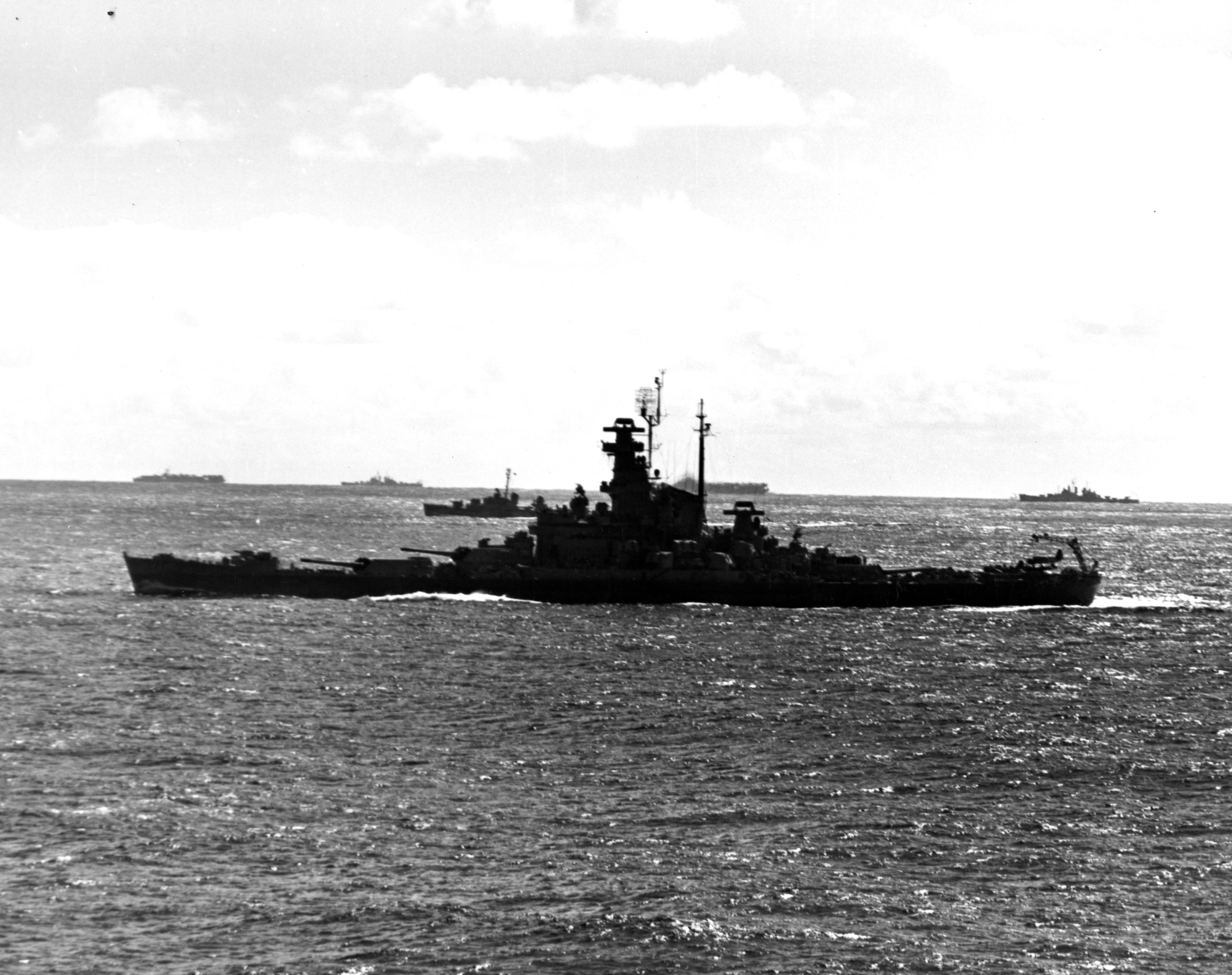
South Dakota-class fast battleship Massachusetts

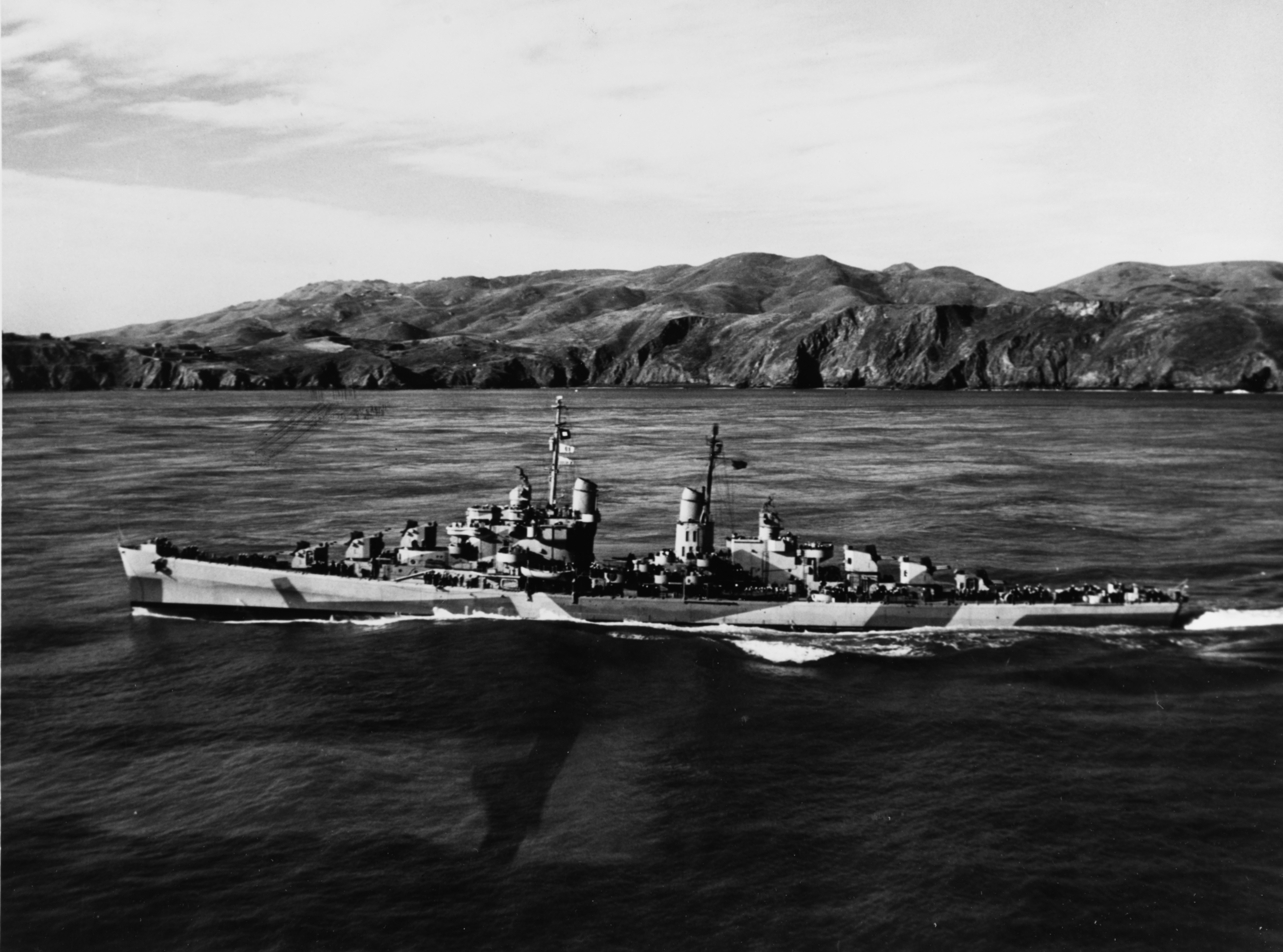
Anti-aircraft light cruiser Reno

2 fleet carriers

Essex (Capt. C.W. Wheeler)

Air Group 15 (Cmdr. David McCampbell)

VF-15: 46 F6F Hellcat fighters, 4 F6F-xN Hellcat night fighters
VB-15: 25 SB2C Helldiver dive bombers
VT-15: 15 TBF Avenger, 5 TBM Avenger torpedo bombers

Lexington (Capt. E.W. Litch)

Air Group 19 (Cmdr. T.H. Winters)

VF-19: 37 F6F Hellcat fighters, 4 F6F-xN Hellcat night fighters
VB-19: 30 SB2C Helldiver dive bombers
VT-19: 18 TBM Avenger torpedo bombers

2 light carriers

Princeton (Capt. W.H. Buracker)

Air Group 27 (Lt. Cmdr. F.A. Bardshar)

VF-27: 21 F6F Hellcat fighters
VT-27: 9 TBM Avenger torpedo bombers

Langley (Capt. J.F. Wegforth)

Air Group 44 (Cmdr. M.T. Wordell)

VF-44: 25 F6F Hellcat fighters
VT-44: 9 TBM Avenger torpedo bombers

4 fast battleships (Vice Adm. Willis Augustus Lee) (Note: Commander Battleships, Pacific Fleet)

1 North Carolina-class (9 × 16-in. main battery): Washington

Battleship Division 8 (Rear Adm. Glenn B. Davis)

1 South Dakota-class (9 × 16-in. main battery): Massachusetts

Battleship Division 9 (Rear Adm. Edward Hanson)

2 South Dakota-class (9 × 16-in. main battery): Alabama, South Dakota

Cruiser Division 13 (Rear Adm. Laurance T. DuBose)

3 light cruisers

All Cleveland-class (12 × 6-in. main battery): Santa Fe, Mobile, Birmingham

1 anti-aircraft light cruiser

1 Atlanta-class (12 × 5-in. main battery): (Note: These cruisers were intended as destroyer leaders when designed. After the first two to be used in this role, Atlanta and Juneau, were lost at the Naval Battle of Guadalcanal, this mission was abandoned and the anti-aircraft mission adopted.) Reno

Screen (Capt. C.R. Todd)

14 destroyers

All Fletcher-class (5 × 5-in. main battery): Clarence K. Bronson, Cotten, Dortch, Gatling, Healy, Porterfield, Callaghan, Cassin Young, Irwin, Preston, Laws, Longshaw, Morrison, Prichett

==== Task Group 38.4 ====
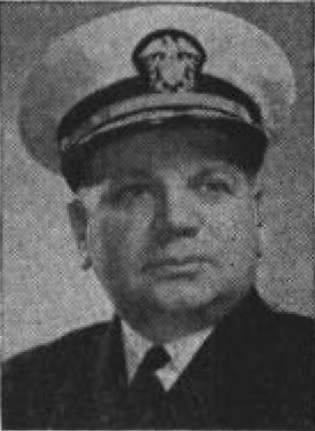
Rear Adm. Ralph E. Davison

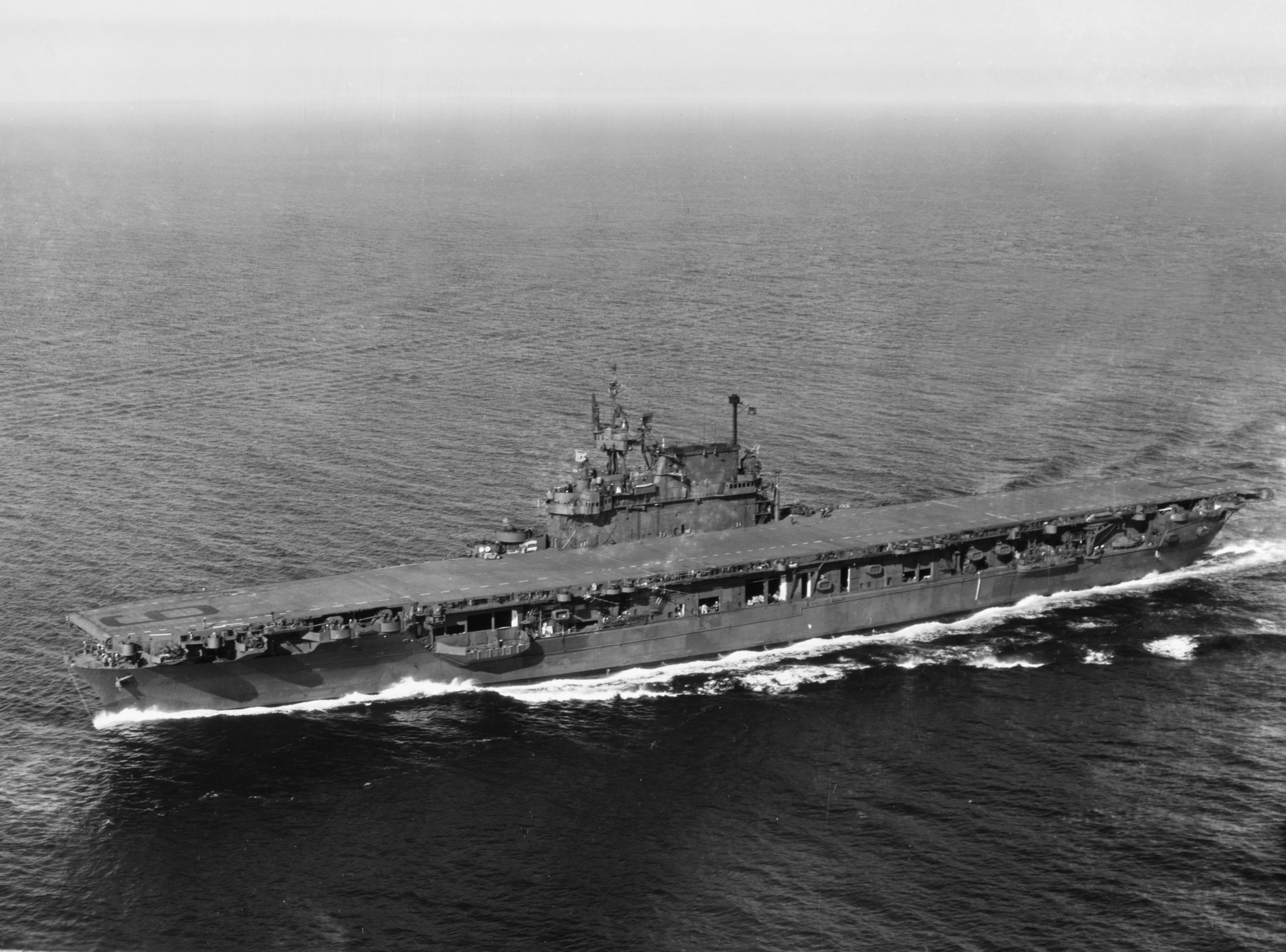
Fleet carrier Enterprise

Destroyer Bagley

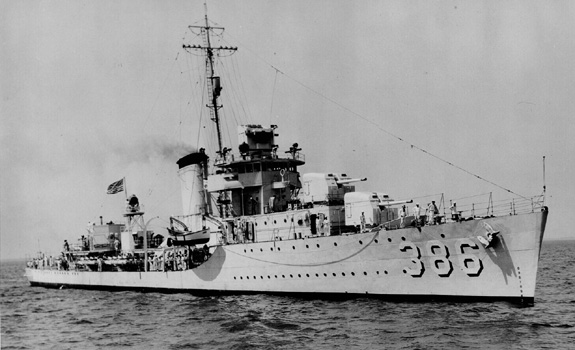
Before World War II

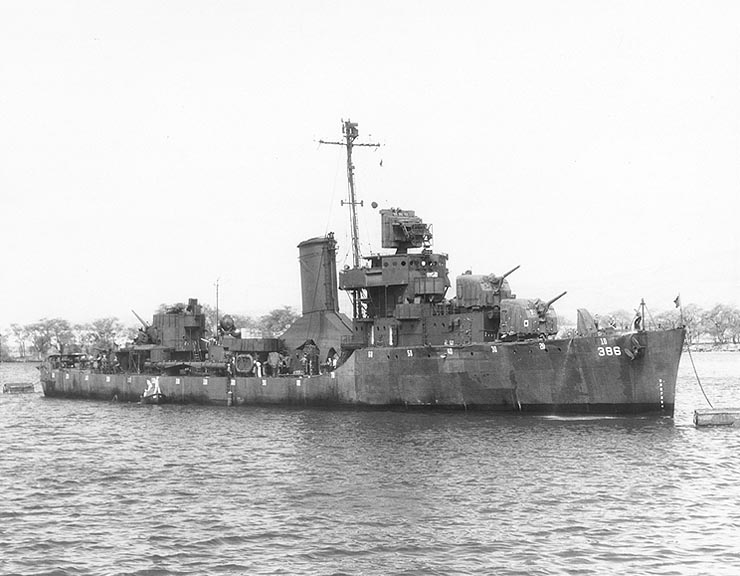
After World War II

Rear Admiral Ralph E. Davison

2 fleet carriers

Franklin (Capt. J.M. Shoemaker)

Air Group 13 (Cmdr. R.L. Kibbe)

VF-13: 34 F6F Hellcat fighters, 4 F6F-xN Hellcat night fighters
VB-13: 31 SB2C Helldiver dive bombers
VT-13: 18 TBM Avenger torpedo bombers

Enterprise (Capt. Cato D. Glover)

Air Group 20 (Cmdr. D.F. Smith)

VF-20: 35 F6F Hellcat fighters, 4 F6F-xN Hellcat night fighters
VB-20: 34 SB2C Helldiver dive bombers
VT-20: 19 TBF Avenger, 5 TBM Avenger torpedo bombers

2 light carriers

San Jacinto (Capt. M.H. Kernodle)

Air Group 51 (Cmdr. C.L. Moore)

VF-51: 19 F6F Hellcat fighters
VT-51: 7 TBM Avenger torpedo bombers

Belleau Wood (Capt. John Perry)

Air Group 21 (Lt. Cmdr. V.F. Casey)

VF-21: 25 F6F Hellcat fighters
VT-21: 9 TBM Avenger torpedo bombers

1 heavy cruiser

1 New Orleans-class (9 × 8-in. main battery): New Orleans

1 light cruiser

1 Cleveland-class (12 × 6-in. main battery): Biloxi

Screen (Capt. V.D. Long)

11 destroyers

3 Gleaves-class (4 × 5-in. main battery): Wilkes, Nicholson, Swanson
3 Gridley-class (4 × 5-in. main battery): Gridley, McCall, Maury
5 Bagley-class (4 × 5-in. main battery): Bagley, Helm, Mugford, Patterson, Ralph Talbot

== Bibliography ==
- Morison, Samuel Eliot (1958). Leyte, June 1944 - January 1945. History of United States Naval Operations in World War II. Vol. XII. Boston: Little, Brown and Co. ISBN 0-7858-1313-6.
- Stille, Mark (2016). US Navy Light Cruisers, 1941-45. Oxford: Osprey Publishing, Ltd. ISBN 978-1-4728-1140-0.
