= List of Allied vessels struck by Japanese special attack weapons =

There were more than 400 Allied vessels struck by Japanese special attack weapons in the last twelve months of World War II, including some vessels that were struck as many as six times in one attack. The one special weapon that is most often associated with World War II is the Japanese kamikaze aircraft. Kamikaze was used to describe the way the Japanese believed they would be victorious by destroying the Allied fleet by crashing aircraft into their ships. The word kamikaze originated as the name of major typhoons in 1274 and 1281, which dispersed Mongolian invasion fleets under Kublai Khan. The Allies referred to these special weapons as "suicide" attacks, and found it difficult to understand why an individual would intentionally crash an airplane into a ship, as the two cultures clashed in battle. Both Imperial Japanese Navy and Imperial Japanese Army had Special Attack Units organized specifically for this mission. Aircraft were not the only special attack weapons. Attack boats, suicide divers, and several types of submarines were also used to destroy ships and landing craft as the Allied forces advanced toward Japan.

The use of the term "code name" in reference to Japanese aircraft (Betty, Kate, Val etc.) is incorrect. They were "nicknames", merely used for ease of identification and pronunciation. There was nothing classified that required the use of "code".

== Kamikaze aircraft ==
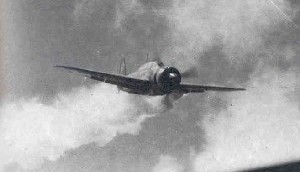
Yokosuka D4Y3 Suisei (Allied code name "Judy") Japanese dive bomber dives on the Essex (November 25, 1944)

Kamikaze (神風; literally: "God wind"; common translation: "Divine wind") [kamikaꜜze], official name: Tokubetsu Kōgekitai (特別攻撃隊), Tokkō Tai (特攻隊) or Tokkō (特攻) were suicide attacks by military aviators from the Empire of Japan against Allied naval vessels in the closing stages of the Pacific campaign of World War II, designed to destroy warships more effectively than was possible with conventional attacks. Numbers quoted vary, but at least 47 Allied vessels, from PT boats to escort carriers, were sunk by kamikaze attacks, and about 300 damaged. During World War II, nearly 3,000 kamikaze pilots were sacrificed. About 14% of kamikaze attacks managed to hit a ship. The Japanese high command exaggerated the effectiveness of the tokko attacks, claiming six aircraft carriers, one escort aircraft carrier and ten battleships had been sunk.

=== Standard IJN and IJA aircraft ===
Almost every make and model of aircraft were used as kamikazes. The most often seen were the Mitsubishi A6M ("Zero," allied code name "Zeke"), Aichi D3A (Allied code name "Val"), Mitsubishi G4M (Allied code name "Betty"), Nakajima B5N (Allied code name "Kate"), Yokosuka P1Y (Allied code name "Francis"), although in the final months of the war, every flyable aircraft was used. The Army used the Kawasaki Ki-61 (Allied code name "Tony"), Mitsubishi Ki-46 (Allied code name "Dinah"), although like the Navy, all available aircraft were to be used as the threat to Japan increased after Iwo Jima fell.

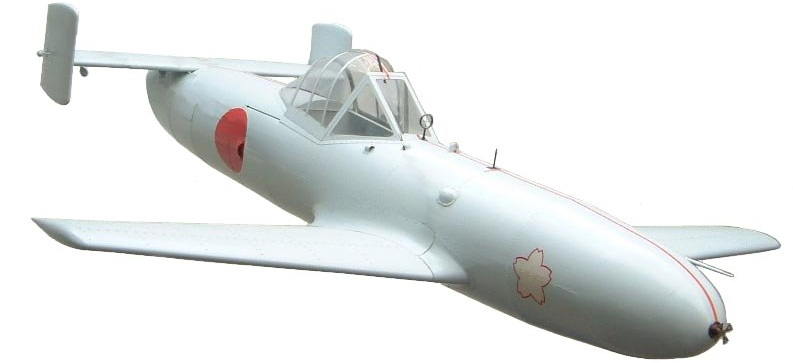
Ohka at the Yasukuni Shrine

=== Ohka ===
The Yokosuka MXY-7 Ohka (also spelled Oka) (櫻花; Shinjitai: 桜花; "cherry blossom"; Hebon-shiki transcription Ōka) was a purpose-built kamikaze aircraft employed by the Imperial Japanese Navy Air Service in the last months of World War II. US forces gave the aircraft the Japanese name Baka which loosely translates as "idiot" or "fool" in English.

Ohka was a small flying bomb that was carried underneath a Mitsubishi G4M "Betty", Yokosuka P1Y Ginga "Frances" or the planned Heavy Nakajima G8N Renzan (Allied code name "Rita") transport type 43A/B and heavy bomber to within range of its target; on release, the pilot would first glide towards the target and, when close enough, he would fire the Ohka's engine(s) and dive into the ship to destroy it. That final approach was almost unstoppable (especially for the rocket-powered Ohka Type 11) because the aircraft was capable of attaining tremendous speed. Later versions were designed to be launched from coastal air bases and caves, and even from submarines equipped with aircraft catapults, although the war ended before they were used this way.

=== Tsurugi ===
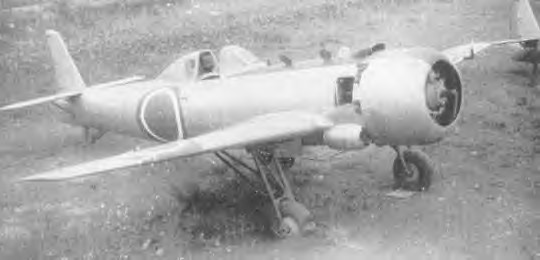
Ki-115 Tsurugi with propeller removed at the end of the war.

The Nakajima Ki-115 Tsurugi (剣 "Sabre") was a one-man purpose-built kamikaze aircraft developed by the Imperial Japanese Army Air Force in the closing stages of World War II in late 1945. More than 100 Ki-115s were completed.

=== Toka ===
The Toka (藤花, "Wisteria Blossom") was the IJN version of the Nakajima Ki-115 Ko. Showa was to build the Toka for the IJN.

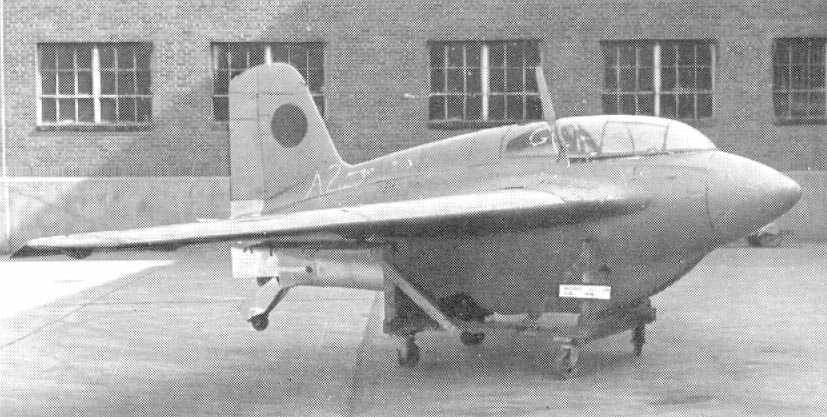
J8M Shusui "Sword Stroke"

=== Shusui ===
The Mitsubishi J8M Shūsui (Japanese: 三菱 J8M 秋水, literally "Autumn Water", used as a poetic term meaning "Sharp Sword" deriving from the swishing sound swords make) used by the Navy and Ki-200 for the Army. The Shusui ("Sword Stroke") was a rocket powered interceptor. It was the Japanese copy of the German Me 163 rocket powered interceptor fighter that was specially designed for use against high flying B-29 bombers. The prototype flew on 7 July 45. The war ended before production.

=== Hiryu To-Go ===
The Hiryu To-Go, also known as the Ki-167 "Sakura-dan", was a Mitsubishi Ki-67 Kai (Allied code name "Peggy") twin-engine bomber with guns removed and faired over, crew reduced to four men. This flying bomb was built with 3 ton thermite shaped-charge bomb behind the cockpit, pointed forward and angled slightly down, and a blast radius of 1 km. Two of these aircraft were known to have been built. One sortied 17 April 1945 and did not return.

=== Shinryu ===
The Mizuno Shinryu ("Divine Dragon") was a proposed rocket-powered kamikaze aircraft designed for the Imperial Japanese Navy towards the end of World War II. It never reached production.

=== Maru-Ten ===
The Maru-Ten was Nakajima's designation for the 'Kōkoku Nigō Heiki (皇国二号兵器, "Imperial Weapon No.2"). This was a suicide weapon with no landing gear, was catapult launched using Rocket Assisted Take Off (RATO), used Ne-12B engines, and carried a single bomb. It was never built, as it evolved into the Nakajima Kikka (中島 橘花, "Orange Blossom").

=== Baika ===
The Kawanishi Baika (梅花, "Ume Blossom") was a pulsejet-powered kamikaze aircraft under development for the Imperial Japanese Navy towards the end of World War II. The war ended before any were built. The design was greatly inspired by the manned version of the German V1 flying bomb, the Fieseler Fi 103R "Reichenberg".

== Boats ==
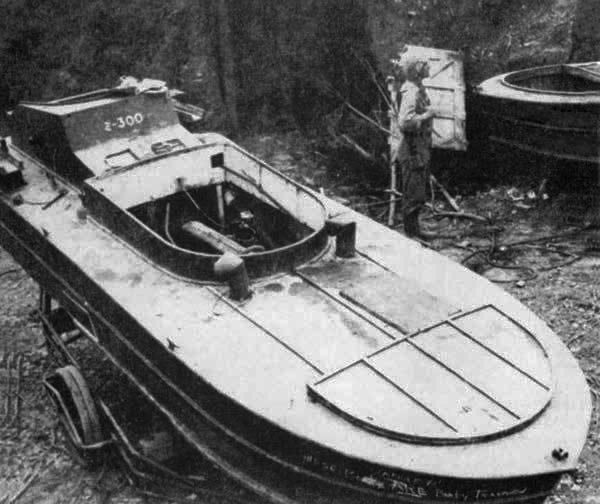
A Shinyo suicide boat.

=== Shin'yō ===
The Shin'yō (Japanese: 震洋, "Sea Quake") were Japanese suicide boats developed during World War II. They were part of the wider Special Attack Units program. These fast motorboats were driven by one man, to speeds of around 30 kn (56 km/h; 35 mph). They were typically equipped with 250 kg (551 lb) of explosives packed in the bow with several impact fuses. The Shinyo units were known as Shimpu Tokubetsu-Kogekitai. About 6,200 Shinyo were produced for the Imperial Japanese Navy.

=== Maru-Ni ===
An additional 3,000 of the Shinyo were produced for the Imperial Japanese Army as Maru-Ni. The Maru-Ni units were known as Shimbu Tokubetsu-Kogekitai. About 400 of these boats were sent to Okinawa and Formosa, the rest were stored on the coast of Japan for the ultimate defense against the invasion of the Home Islands. The Maru-Ni attacked by dropping one or two shallow-set depth charges as close to the target ship as possible, with the intention of turning away as the depth charges were released off the stern.

== Midget submarines ==
=== Ko-hyoteki ===
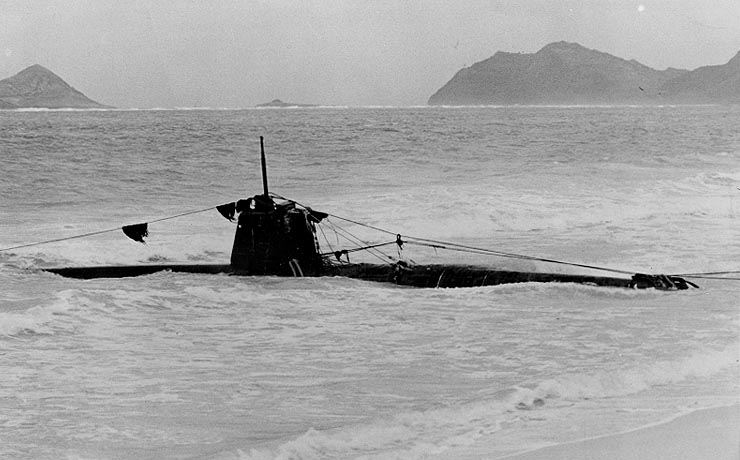
Type A Ko-hyoteki class submarine, No.19, grounded in the surf on Oahu after the attack on Pearl Harbor, December 1941

The Type A Ko-hyoteki (甲標的甲型, Kō-hyōteki kō-gata; Target 'A', Type 'A') class was a class of Japanese midget submarines (Ko-hyoteki) was manufactured in three Types:

- Type A Ko-hyoteki-class midget submarines were used in the 1942 Attack on Sydney Harbour, Attack on Diego Suarez Harbor and the 1941 attack on Pearl Harbor.
- Type B Midget Ha 45 prototype built 1942 to test Type A improvements.
- Type C Midget Ha 62–76 similar to Type A with crew of 3 and radius increased to 350 nautical miles (650 km) at 6 knots (11 km/h) surfaced or 120 nautical miles (220 km) at 4 knots (7.4 km/h) submerged.
- Type D Koryu (115 completed) improved Type C with crew of 5 and radius increased to 1000 miles at 8 knots surfaced and 320 miles at 16 knots submerged.

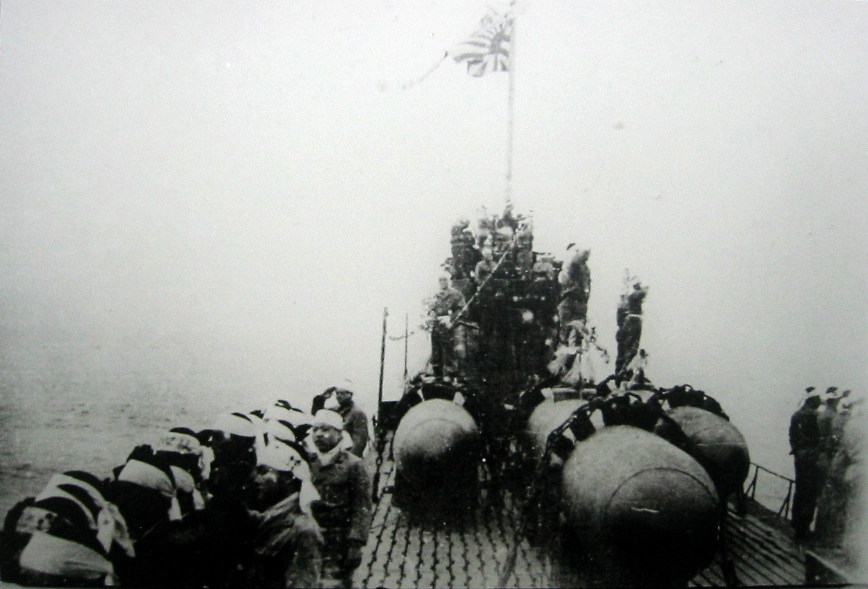
Kaiten manned torpedoes, secured on the deck of a submarine.

=== Kaiten ===
The Kaiten (Japanese: 回天, literal translation: "Return to the sky", commonly rendered as: "The turn toward heaven", "The Heaven Shaker" or "Change the World") was a torpedo modified as a suicide weapon, and used by the Imperial Japanese Navy in the final stages of World War II.

Early designs allowed for the pilot to escape after the final acceleration towards the target, although whether this could have been done successfully is doubtful. There is no record of any pilot attempting to escape or intending to do so, and this provision was dropped from later production kaitens. The inventor of the Kaiten, Lt. Hiroshi Kuroki was lost during one of the first training missions. When the sub was raised a note was found with a note written during his final minutes before death, sending his respects to his family and detailing the cause of the accident and how to repair the defect.

=== Kairyu ===
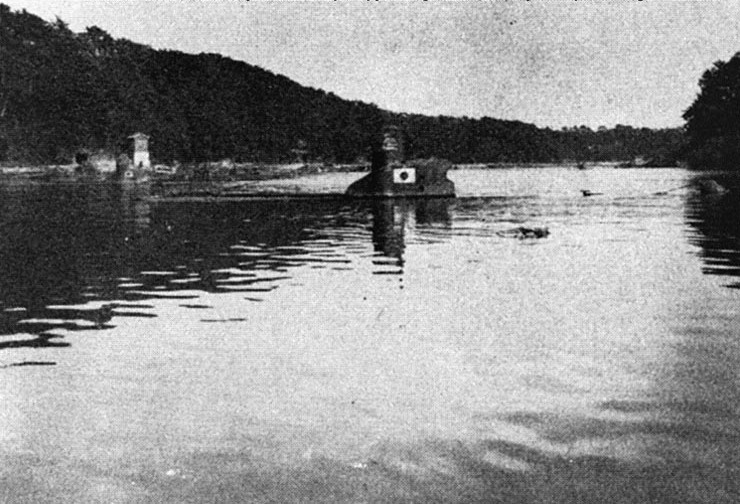
A Kairyu in the Aburatsubo inlet.

The Kairyu (海龍, Kairyū; "Sea Dragon") was a Small, 2-man, midget submarine of the Imperial Japanese Navy of 20 ton that was based on the Type A midget submarine that was used in the 1941 attack on Pearl Harbor. All five of the Type A midget submarines used were captured (1) or destroyed (4). Midgets also attacked in Sydney (all four lost) and Madagascar in June 1942. The Kairyu mini-submarines were meant to meet the invading American Naval forces upon their anticipated approach of Tokyo. Although not intended only as a suicide weapon, crew survival was possible, but the odds of survival were not high. These mini-submarines were built so that they could be equipped with either two torpedoes or a 1,000 pound warhead in the bow, for crashing into ships as the kaiten did. Over 760 of these submarines were planned, and by August 1945, 200 had been manufactured, most of them at the Yokosuka shipyard, but of the 200, only 115 were ready for use at the time of surrender.

=== Fukuryu ===
Fukuryu (Japanese:伏龍, Fukuryu "Crouching dragons") suicide divers were a part of the Special Attack Units prepared to resist the invasion of the Home islands by Allied forces. They were equipped with a diving jacket and trousers, diving shoes, and a diving helmet fixed by four bolts. They were typically weighed down with 9 kg (20 lb) of lead, and had two bottles of compressed air at 150 bars. They were expected to be able to walk at a depth of 5 to 7 m (16 to 23 ft), for about six hours. The Fukuryu were armed with a 15 kg (33 lb) mine fired with a contact fuse, fitted onto the end of a 5 m (16 ft) bamboo pole. To attack, they would swim under a ship and slam the mine onto the ship's hull, destroying themselves in the process. This new weapon is only known to have been used a few times operationally:

- January 8, 1945: Infantry landing craft (gunboat) LCI(G)-404 damaged by suicide divers in Yoo Passage, Palaus.
- February 10, 1945: Attempted attack on surveying ship USS Hydrographer (AGS-2) by suicide divers in Schonian Harbor, Palaus.

== Land-based suicide weapons ==
=== Nikaku ===
Although the Nikaku were not specifically designated as anti-ship weapons, the mental conditioning and training they received prepared them to pilot a Maru Ni, should the need arise. Nikaku were IJA soldiers with explosives strapped to their bodies, acting as human anti-tank mines. The method used in the attack was very simple: the soldier would crawl between the tank treads or allow the tank to drive over him, then explode the charge. The army pioneered this technique in the Philippines and on Okinawa. Other methods used were where the weapon was a shaped-charge on a spike or a simple hand grenade.

=== Giretsu Kūteitai ===
Giretsu (義烈空挺隊, Giretsu Kūteitai) was an airlifted special forces unit of the Imperial Japanese Army formed from Army paratroopers, in November 1944 as a last-ditch attempt to reduce and delay Allied bombing raids on the Japanese home islands. These forces were airlifted and crash landed onto Allied Army or Marine air strips, with the intention of destroying as many aircraft as possible before being killed. On 24 May 1945, a Giretsu force of five Mitsubishi Ki-21 bombers, commanded by Captain Chuichi Suwabe, attacked Yontan airfield, in northern Okinawa. The planes crash-landed on the airfield, where the suicide commandos destroyed nine aircraft, damaged 29 others and set on fire 70,000 gallons of fuel. All the Japanese paratroopers were slain save one, who managed to reach the Japanese lines. Two US servicemen were killed in action.

== List of ships ==
This table lists every known ship that was attacked and damaged by a Japanese special weapon. Not included are ships that were not damaged from a near miss, or were damaged when debris from another ship that was attacked and hit fell or flew on or into it.

Unless otherwise noted, these ships were hit by one kamikaze aircraft.

Sunk by one or more kamikaze aircraft
Hit or sunk by Ohka man-guided flying bomb
Hit or sunk by Shinyo or Maru-Ni manned demolition boat
Hit or sunk by Kaiten manned torpedo
Hit or sunk by Fukuryu suicide swimmers

Ship	Country	Type	Damaged or Sunk	Date	Location	Source
USS Aaron Ward (DM-34) ex DD-773	United States	Destroyer minelayer	Damaged	3 May 1945	Okinawa radar picket station number 10	Cressman, p 672; DANFS; Rieley p 220-214
USS Abner Read (DD-526)	United States	Destroyer	Sunk	1 November 1944	10°47'N, 125°22'E	Cressman, p 569; DANFS
USS Achernar (AKA-53) ex SS Achernar	United States	Attack cargo ship (Built as a type C2-S-B1 ship)	Damaged	2 April 1945	26°07'N, 127°45'E, San Pedro Bay, Philippine Islands	Cressman, p 653; DANFS
USS Achilles (ARL-41) ex USS LST-455	United States	Repair ship, landing craft	Damaged	12 November 1944	11°11'N, 125°05'E	Cressman, p 575; DANFS; NavSource
USS Adams (DM-27) ex DD-739	United States	Destroyer minelayer (converted destroyer)	Damaged	27 March 1945	26°17'N, 127°40'E	Cressman, p 649; DANFS
USS Adams (DM-27) ex DD-739	United States	Destroyer minelayer (converted destroyer)	Damaged	31 March 1945	26°12'N, 127°08'E	Cressman, p 652; DANFS
SS Alcoa Pioneer	United States	Type C1-B cargo ship	Damaged	19 November 1944	San Pedro Bay, Leyte	Cressman, p 581; Browning, p 456
SS Alexander Majors USAT	United States	"Liberty" cargo ship	Damaged	12 November 1944	11°11'N, 125°05'E, off Leyte	Cressman, p 575; Browning, p 453; Bud's Liberty & Victory cargo ships
USS Allegan (AK-225) ex SS Van Lear Vlack	United States	Cargo ship (Built as a type EC2-S-C1 ship)	Damaged	3 June 1945	26°00'N, 128°00'E	Cressman, p 688; DANFS
USS Allen M. Sumner (DD-692)	United States	Destroyer	Damaged	6 January 1945	16°40'N, 120°10'E	Cressman, p 604; DANFS
USS Alpine (APA-92) ex SS Sea Arrow	United States	Attack personnel transport ship	Damaged	12 November 1944	11°07'N, 125°02'E	Cressman, p 579; DANFS; NavSource
USS Alpine (APA-92) ex SS Sea Arrow	United States	Attack personnel transport ship	Damaged	17 November 1944	11°07'N, 125°02'E, off Leyte	Cressman, p 579; DANFS; NavSource
USS Alpine (APA-92) ex SS Sea Arrow	United States	Attack personnel transport ship	Damaged	1 April 1945	26°20'N, 127°41'E	Cressman, p 652; DANFS; NavSource
USS Ammen (DD-527)	United States	Destroyer	Damaged	1 November 1944	10°40'N, 125°20'E	Cressman, p 569; DANFS
USS Anderson (DD-411)	United States	Destroyer	Damaged	1 November 1944	10°11'N, 125°02'E	Cressman, p 569; DANFS
USS Anthony (DD-515)	United States	Destroyer	Damaged	27 May 1945	26°25'N, 128°30'E	Cressman, p 684; DANFS
USS Anthony (DD-515)	United States	Destroyer	Damaged	7 June 1945	27°07'N, 127°38'E	Cressman, p 691; DANFS
USS Apache (ATF-67)	United States	Fleet tug	Damaged	5 January 1945	15°53'N, 120°00'E	Cressman, p 604; DANFS
HMAS Arunta	Australia	Destroyer	Damaged	5 January 1945	14°00'N, 120°00'E	Cressman, p 604; Sea Power Centre - Australia
SS Augustus Thomas	United States	"Liberty" cargo ship	Damaged	24 October 1944	San Pedro Bay, Philippine Islands	Cressman, p 561; Browning, p 441
USS Aulick (DD-569)	United States	Destroyer	Damaged	29 November 1944	10°35'N, 125°40'E	Cressman, p 585; DANFS
HMAS Australia (D84)	Australia	Heavy cruiser	Damaged	5 January 1945	14°00'N, 120°00'E	Cressman, p 604; Sea Power Centre - Australia
HMAS Australia (D84)	Australia	Heavy cruiser	Damaged	6 January 1945	16°20'N, 120°10'E	Cressman, p 604; Sea Power Centre - Australia
HMAS Australia (D84)	Australia	Heavy cruiser	Damaged	8 January 1945	16°22'N, 120°12'E	Cressman, p 606; Sea Power Centre - Australia
HMAS Australia (D84)	Australia	Heavy cruiser	Damaged	9 January 1945	16°22'N, 120°12'E	Cressman, p 607; Sea Power Centre - Australia
USS Bache (DD-470)	United States	Destroyer	Damaged	3 May 1945	Off Okinawa	Cressman, p 672; DANFS
USS Bache (DD-470)	United States	Destroyer	Damaged	13 May 1945	26°01'N, 126°53'E	Cressman, p 678; DANFS
USS Barry (APD-29) ex DD-248	United States	Troop transport (high speed)	Damaged	25 May 1945	26°30'N, 127°00'E	Cressman, p 683; DANFS
USS Barry (APD-29) ex DD-248	United States	Troop transport (high speed)	Damaged	21 June 1945	off Okinawa	DANFS; Naval Historical Center; Kimball (2007)
USS Barry (APD-29) ex DD-248	United States	Troop transport (high speed)	Sunk	22 June 1945	En route to Ie Shima	Cressman, p 701-702; DANFS
USS Bates (APD-47) ex DE-68	United States	Troop transport (high speed)	Sunk	25 May 1945	26°41'N, 127°47'E	Cressman, p 683; DANFS
USS Belknap (APD-34) ex DD-251 ex AVD-8	United States	Troop transport (high speed)	Damaged	12 January 1945	16°20'N, 120°10'E, off Luzon	Cressman, p 608; DANFS
USS Belleau Wood (CVL-24)	United States	Aircraft carrier, light	Damaged	30 October 1944	100 miles E of Samar Island	Cressman, p 568; DANFS
USS Benham (DD-796)	United States	Destroyer	Damaged	17 April 1945	24°01'N, 132°32'E, off Okinawa	Cressman, p 664; DANFS
SS Benjamin Ide Wheeler	United States	"Liberty" cargo ship	Damaged	27 October 1944	Off Leyte	Cressman, p 566; Browning, p 443
USS Bennion (DD-662)	United States	Destroyer	Damaged	28 April 1945	27°26'N, 127°51'E	Cressman, p 669; DANFS
USS Bennion (DD-662)	United States	Destroyer	Damaged	30 April 1945	27°26'N, 127°51'E, off Okinawa	Cressman, p 671; DANFS
USS Bennett (DD-473)	United States	Destroyer	Damaged	7 April 1945	27°16'N, 127°48'E	Cressman, p 658; DANFS
USS Biloxi (CL-80)	United States	Light cruiser	Damaged	26 March 1945	26°20'N, 127°18'E	Cressman, p 648; DANFS
USS Birmingham (CL-62)	United States	Light cruiser	Damaged	4 May 1945	26°19'N, 127°43'E	Cressman, p 673; DANFS
USS Bismarck Sea (CVE-95)	United States	Aircraft carrier, escort	Sunk	21 February 1945	24°36'N, 141°48'E, off Iwo Jima	Cressman, p 627; DANFS
USS Borie (DD-704)	United States	Destroyer	Damaged	9 August 1945	37°21'N, 143°45'E, off Honshu	Cressman, p 730; DANFS
USS Bowers (DE-637)	United States	Destroyer escort	Damaged	16 April 1945	26°52'N, 127°52'E	Cressman, p 664; DANFS
SS Bozeman Victory	United States	"Victory" cargo ship	Damaged	28 April 1945	In Nago Bay	Cressman, p 669; Browning, p 508
USS Braine (DD-630)	United States	Destroyer	Damaged	27 May 1945	26°25'N, 128°30'E	Cressman, p 684; DANFS
USS Bright (DE-747)	United States	Destroyer escort	Damaged	13 May 1945	26°21'N, 127°17'E	Cressman, p 678; DANFS
USS Brooks (APD-10) ex DD-232	United States	Troop transport (high speed)	Damaged	6 January 1945	16°20'N, 120°10'E	Cressman, p 604; DANFS
USS Brown (DD-546)	United States	Destroyer	Damaged	10 May 1945	26°26'N, 127°20'E	Cressman, p 676; DANFS
SS Brown Victory	United States	"Victory" cargo ship	Damaged	28 May 1945	Off Ie Shima	Cressman, p 685; Browning, p 514
USS Bryant (DD-665)	United States	Destroyer	Damaged	22 December 1944	12°00'N, 121°00'E, off Mindoro	Cressman, p 595; DANFS
USS Bryant (DD-665)	United States	Destroyer	Damaged	16 April 1945	27°05'N, 128°13'E	Cressman, p 664; DANFS
USS Bullard (DD-660)	United States	Destroyer	Damaged	11 April 1945	26°00'N, 130°00'E	Cressman, p 660; DANFS
USS Bunker Hill (CV-17)	United States	Aircraft carrier	Damaged	11 May 1945	25°44'N, 129°28'E	Cressman, p 676; DANFS
USS Bush (DD-529)	United States	Destroyer	Sunk	6 April 1945	27°16'N, 127°48'E, off Okinawa	Cressman, p 655; DANFS
USS Butler (DMS-29) ex DD-636	United States	High speed minesweeper (converted destroyer)	Damaged	28 April 1945	26°00'N, 127°00'E	Cressman, p 669; DANFS
USS Butler (DMS-29) ex DD-636	United States	High speed minesweeper (converted destroyer)	Damaged	25 May 1945	26°12'N, 127°50'E	Cressman, p 683; DANFS
USS Cabot (CVL-28)	United States	Aircraft carrier, light	Damaged	25 November 1944	15°42'N, 123°09'E	Cressman, p 584; DANFS
USS Caldwell (DD-605)	United States	Destroyer	Damaged	12 December 1944	10°30'N, 124°42'E, off Leyte	Cressman, p 592; DANFS
USS California (BB-44)	United States	Battleship	Damaged	6 January 1945	16°20'N, 120°10'E	Cressman, p 604; DANFS
USS Callaghan (DD-792)	United States	Destroyer	Damaged	26 March 1945	26°20'N, 127°43'E	Cressman, p 648; DANFS
USS Callaghan (DD-792)	United States	Destroyer	Sunk	29 July 1945	25°43'N, 126°55'E	Cressman, p 722; DANFS
USS Callaway (APA-35)	United States	Attack personnel transport ship	Damaged	7 January 1945	17°00'N, 120°00'E	Cressman, p 607; DANFS
SS Canada Victory	United States	"Victory" cargo ship	Sunk	27 April 1945	Off Okinawa	Cressman, p 669; Browning, pp 506–508
SS Cape Constance	United States	Type C1-B cargo ship	Damaged	3 November 1944	Tacloban, Leyte	Cressman, p 571; Browning, p 544
SS Cape Romano	United States	Type C1-A cargo ship	Damaged	19 November 1944	San Pedro Bay, Leyte	Cressman, p 581; Browning, p 457
USS Carina (AK-74) ex "Liberty" ship S.S. David Davis	United States	"Liberty" cargo ship	Damaged	3 May 1945	26°13'N, 127°50'E	Cressman, p 672; DANFS; Rielley (2010), pp 253, 323
USS Cassin Young (DD-793)	United States	Destroyer	Damaged	12 April 1945	27°17'N, 127°50'E	Cressman, p 661; DANFS
USS Cassin Young (DD-793)	United States	Destroyer	Damaged	29 July 1945	26°08'N, 127°58'E	Cressman, p 723; DANFS
USS Champion (AM-134)	United States	Minesweeper	Damaged	16 April 1945	Off Okinawa	DANFS; Rielly (2010,) p 233
USS Charles J. Badger (DD-657)	United States	Destroyer	Damaged	8 April 1945	26°18'N, 127°39'E, off Okinawa	Cressman, p 659; DANFS
USS Chase (APD-54) ex DE-158	United States	Troop transport (high speed)	Damaged	20 May 1945	26°18'N, 127°14'E	Cressman, p 673; DANFS
USS Chilton (APA-38)	United States	Attack personnel transport ship	Damaged	2 April 1945	25°59'N, 127°17'E	Cressman, p 653
USS Claxton (DD-571)	United States	Destroyer	Damaged	1 November 1944	10°40'N, 125°20'E	Cressman, p 569; DANFS
USS Colhoun (DD-801)	United States	Destroyer	Sunk	6 April 1945	27°16'N, 127°48'E	Cressman, p 655; DANFS
USS Colorado (BB-45)	United States	Battleship	Damaged	27 November 1944	10°50'N, 125°25'E	Cressman, p 585; DANFS
USS Columbia (CL-56)	United States	Light cruiser	Damaged	6 January 1945	16°20'N, 120°10'E	Cressman, p 604; DANFS
USS Columbia (CL-56)	United States	Light cruiser	Damaged	9 January 1945	16°08'N, 120°10'E	Cressman, p 607; DANFS
USS Comfort (AH-6)	United States	Hospital ship	Damaged	28 April 1945	25°30'N, 127°40'E	Cressman, p 669; DANFS
USS Connolly (DE-306)	United States	Destroyer escort	Damaged	13 April 1945	26°55'N, 126°46'E, off Okinawa	Cressman, p 662; Rielly (2010), p 235
USS Cowanesque (AO-79)	United States	Fleet oiler	Damaged	3 January 1945	08°56'N, 122°49'E	Cressman, p 603; DANFS
USS Cowell (DD-547)	United States	Destroyer	Damaged	25 May 1945	Off Okinawa	DANFS; Rielly (2010), p 152
USS Curtiss (AV-4)	United States	Seaplane tender	Damaged	21 June 1945	26°10'N, 127°18'E	Cressman, p 701
USS Daly (DD-519)	United States	Destroyer	Damaged	28 April 1945	27°12'N, 128°16'E	Cressman, p 669; DANFS
USS Dashiell (DD-659)	United States	Destroyer	Damaged	14 April 1945	27°15'N, 130°25'E, off Okinawa	Cressman, p 662; DANFS
SS David Dudley Field	United States	"Liberty" cargo ship	Damaged	24 October 1944	Tacloban, Leyte	Cressman, p 561; Browning, p 442
SS David Dudley Field	United States	"Liberty" cargo ship	Damaged	12 January 1945	Subic Bay	Cressman, p 609; Browning, p 481
USS Defense (AM-317)	United States	Minesweeper	Damaged	6 April 1945	26°38'N, 127°31'E	Cressman, p 655; DANFS
USS Denver (CL-58)	United States	Light cruiser	Damaged	27 November 1944	10°57'N, 125°02'E	Cressman, p 567; DANFS
USS Devastator (AM-318)	United States	Minesweeper	Damaged	6 April 1945	26°26'N, 127°40'E	Cressman, p 655
USS Devilfish (SS-292)	United States	Submarine	Damaged	20 March 1945	En route to patrol area	DANFS
USS Dickerson (APD-21) ex DD-157	United States	Troop transport (high speed)	Damaged	2 April 1945	26°21'N, 127°45'E	Cressman, p 653; DANFS
USS Dickerson (APD-21) ex DD-157	United States	Troop transport (high speed)	Sunk	4 April 1945	off Kerama Retto	Cressman, p 654; DANFS
USS Dorsey (DMS-1) ex DD-117	United States	High speed minesweeper (converted destroyer)	Damaged	26 March 1945	26°20'N, 127°18'E	Cressman, p 648; DANFS
USS Douglas H. Fox (DD-779)	United States	Destroyer	Damaged	17 May 1945	25°59'N, 126°54'E	Cressman, p 680; DANFS
USS Drayton (DD-366)	United States	Destroyer	Damaged	5 December 1944	10°10'N, 125°20'E	Cressman, p 588; DANFS
USS Drexler (DD-741)	United States	Destroyer	Sunk	28 May 1945	27°06'N, 127°38'E	Cressman, p 685; DANFS
USS DuPage (APA-41)	United States	Attack personnel transport ship	Damaged	10 January 1945	16°17'N, 120°15'E	Cressman, p 608; DANFS
USS Dutton (AGS-8)	United States	Survey Ship	Damaged	27 May 1945	26°15'N, 127°59'E	Cressman, p 684; DANFS
USS Earl V. Johnson (DE-702)	United States	Destroyer escort	Damaged	4 August 1945	20°17'N, 128°07'E	Cressman, p 727; DANFS
SS Edward N. Westcott	United States	"Liberty" cargo ship	Damaged	12 January 1945	Off the west coast of Luzon	Cressman, p 609; Browning, p 480
USS Egeria (ARL-8)	United States	Repair Ship, Landing Craft	Damaged	12 November 1944	11°11'N, 125°05'E	Cressman, p 575; Rielly (2010), p 131
USS Ellyson (DMS-19) ex DD-545	United States	High speed minesweeper (converted destroyer)	Damaged	22 June 1945	26°04'N, 127°55'E	Cressman, p 702; Rielly (2010), p 294
SS Elmira Victory	United States	"Victory" cargo ship	Damaged	12 January 1945	16°11'N, 120°20'E	Cressman, p 609; Browning, p 489
USS Emmons (DMS-22) ex DD-457	United States	High speed minesweeper (converted destroyer)	Damaged	6 April 1945	26°48'N, 128°04'E	Cressman, p 655; DANFS
USS Emmons (DMS-22) ex DD-457	United States	High speed minesweeper (converted destroyer)	Sunk	7 April 1945	Off Okinawa	Cressman, p 658; DANFS
USS England (DE-635)	United States	Destroyer escort	Damaged	9 May 1945	26°18'N, 127°13'E	Cressman, p 676; DANFS
USS Enterprise (CV-6)	United States	Aircraft carrier	Damaged	11 April 1945	26°00'N, 128°00'E	Cressman, p 660; DANFS
USS Enterprise (CV-6)	United States	Aircraft carrier	Damaged	14 May 1945	30°23'N, 132°36'E, off Honshu	Cressman, p 678; DANFS
USS Essex (CV-9)	United States	Aircraft carrier	Damaged	25 November 1944	15°47'N, 124°14'E	Cressman, p 584; DANFS
USS Evans (DD-552)	United States	Destroyer	Damaged	11 May 1945	26°58'N, 127°32'E	Cressman, p 676; DANFS
USS Facility (AM-233)	United States	Minesweeper	Damaged	6 April 1945	26°00'N, 127°00'E	Cressman, p 655; DANFS
USS Fieberling (DE-640)	United States	Destroyer escort	Damaged	6 April 1945	26°48'N, 128°04'E	Cressman, p 655; DANFS
USS Foote (DD-511)	United States	Destroyer	Damaged	21 December 1944	11°05'N, 121°20'E, off Mindoro	Cressman, p 595; Rielly (2010), pp 147, 151
USS Foreman (DE-633)	United States	Destroyer escort	Damaged	26 March 1945	26°20'N, 127°18'E	Cressman, p 648; DANFS
HMS Formidable (R67)	United Kingdom	Aircraft carrier	Damaged	4 May 1945	26°01'N, 237°26'E'	Cressman, p 673 naval-history.net
HMS Formidable (R67)	United Kingdom	Aircraft carrier	Damaged	9 May 1945	Off Okinawa	Cressman, p 676 naval-history.net
USS Forrest (DMS-24) ex DD-461	United States	High speed minesweeper (converted destroyer)	Damaged	27 May 1945	26°16'N, 128°04'E	Cressman, p 685; DANFS; USS Forrest War Diary
SS Francisco Morazan	United States	"Liberty" cargo ship	Damaged	30 December 1944	Off Mindoro	Cressman, p 598; Browning, p 472
USS Franklin (CV-13)	United States	Aircraft carrier	Damaged	13 October 1944	22°55'N, 123°12'E	Cressman, p 554; DANFS; Rielly (2010), p 115
USS Franklin (CV-13)	United States	Aircraft carrier	Damaged	30 October 1944	100 miles E of Samar Island	Rielly (2010), p 123
USS Gansevoort (DD-608)	United States	Destroyer	Damaged	30 December 1944	12°21'N, 121°02'E	Cressman, p 598; DANFS
USS Gayety (AM-239)	United States	Minesweeper	Damaged	4 May 1945	26°32'N, 126°58'E	Cressman, p 673; DANFS
MV General Fleischer	Norway	Motor vessel	Damaged	19 November 1944	San Pedro Bay, Leyte	Cressman, p 581; Rielly, (2010) p 132
SS Gilbert Stuart USAT	United States	"Liberty" cargo ship	Damaged	18 November 1944	Off Tacloban	Cressman, p 580; Browning, p 455
USS Gilligan (DE-508)	United States	Destroyer escort	Damaged	12 January 1945	16°20'N, 120°10'E, off the west coast of Luzon	Cressman, p 609; DANFS
USS Gilmer (APD-11) ex DD-233	United States	Troop transport (high speed)	Damaged	25 March 1945	26°00'N, 127°20'E	Cressman, p 647; DANFS
USS Gladiator (AM-319)	United States	Minesweeper	Damaged	12 April 1945	26°05'N, 127°35'E	Cressman, p 661; DANFS
USS Gladiator (AM-319)	United States	Minesweeper	Damaged	22 April 1945	26°21'N, 127°45'E	Cressman, p 667; DANFS
USS Goodhue (APA-107)	United States	Attack personnel transport ship	Damaged	2 April 1945	25°56'N, 127°17'E	Cressman, p 653; DANFS
USS Gregory (DD-802)	United States	Destroyer	Damaged	8 April 1945	27°07'N, 128°39'E, off Okinawa	Cressman, p 659; DANFS
USS Guest (DD-472)	United States	Destroyer	Damaged	25 May 1945	26°22'N, 127°44'E	Cressman, p 683; DANFS
USS Gwin (DM-33) ex DD-77	United States	Destroyer minelayer	Damaged	4 May 1945	Off Okinawa	Cressman, p 673; DANFS
USS Haggard (DD-555)	United States	Destroyer	Damaged	29 April 1945	27°01'N, 129°40'E, off Okinawa	Cressman, p 670; DANFS
USS Halloran (DE-305)	United States	Destroyer escort	Damaged	21 June 1945	26°00'N, 128°00'E	Cressman, p 701; DANFS
USS Halsey Powell (DD-686)	United States	Destroyer	Damaged	20 March 1945	30°27'N, 134°28'E	Cressman, p 644; DANFS
USS Hambleton (DMS-20) ex DD-455	United States	High speed minesweeper (converted destroyer)	Damaged	3 April 1945	27°00'N, 127°00'E	Cressman, p 654; DANFS
USS Hancock (CV-19)	United States	Aircraft carrier	Damaged	25 November 1944	15°47'N, 124°14'E	Cressman, p 584; DANFS
USS Hancock (CV-19)	United States	Aircraft carrier	Damaged	7 April 1945	27°00'N, 130°00'E	Cressman, p 658; DANFS
USS Hank (DD-702)	United States	Destroyer	Damaged	11 April 1945	Off Okinawa	DANFS
USS Haraden (DD-585)	United States	Destroyer	Damaged	13 December 1944	08°40'N, 122°33'E, Mindanao-Negros area	Cressman, p 592; DANFS
USS Harding (DMS-28) ex DD-625	United States	High speed minesweeper (converted destroyer)	Damaged	16 April 1945	26°42'N, 127°25'E	Cressman, p 664; DANFS
USS Harrison (DD-573)	United States	Destroyer	Damaged	6 April 1945	27°05'N, 129°22'E	Cressman, p 656
USS Harry F. Bauer (DM-26) ex DD-738	United States	Light minelayer (converted destroyer)	Damaged	29 April 1945	26°47'N, 128°42'E, off Okinawa	Cressman, p 670; DANFS
USS Harry F. Bauer (DM-26) ex DD-738	United States	Light minelayer (converted destroyer)	Damaged	10 May 1945	26°25'N, 128°31'E	Cressman, p 676; DANFS
USS Harry F. Bauer (DM-26) ex DD-738	United States	Light minelayer (converted destroyer)	Damaged	6 June 1945	Off Okinawa	Cressman, p 690; DANFS
USS Haynsworth (DD-700)	United States	Destroyer	Damaged	6 April 1945	26°55'N, 129°29'E	Cressman, p 655; DANFS
USS Hazelwood (DD-531)	United States	Destroyer	Damaged	29 April 1945	27°02'N, 129°59'E, off Okinawa	Cressman, p 670; DANFS
USS Helm (DD-388)	United States	Destroyer	Damaged	5 January 1945	15°00'N, 119°00'E	Cressman, p 604; Rielly (2010), p 158
USS Henrico (APA-45)	United States	Attack personnel transport ship	Damaged	2 April 1945	25°59'N, 127°17'E	Cressman, p 653; DANFS
USS Hinsdale (APA-120)	United States	Attack personnel transport ship	Damaged	31 March 1945	25°54'N, 127°49'E	Cressman, p 652
USS Hinsdale (APA-120)	United States	Attack personnel transport ship	Damaged	1 April 1945	26°20'N, 127°41'E	Cressman, p 652; DANFS; Rielly (2010), p 206
SS Hobbs Victory	United States	"Victory" cargo ship	Sunk	6 April 1945	26°05'N, 125°14'E, northwest of Kerama Retto	Cressman, p 657; Browning, p 500
USS Hobson (DMS-26) ex DD-464)	United States	High speed minesweeper (converted destroyer)	Damaged	16 April 1945	27°26'N, 126°59'E	Cressman, p 664; DANFS
USS Hodges (DE-231)	United States	Destroyer escort	Damaged	9 January 1945	16°22'N, 120°12'E	Cressman, p 607; DANFS
USS Hopkins (DD-249)	United States	Destroyer	Damaged	4 May 1945	Off Okinawa	DANFS; Rielly (2010) p 260
USS Horace A. Bass (APD-124) ex DE-691)	United States	Troop transport (high speed)	Damaged	29 July 1945	26°17'N, 127°34'E	Cressman, p 723; DANFS
USS Howorth (DD-592)	United States	Destroyer	Damaged	15 December 1944	12°19'N, 121°02'E	Cressman, p 593; DANFS
USS Howorth (DD-592)	United States	Destroyer	Damaged	6 April 1945	26°32'N, 127°40'E	Cressman, p 655; DANFS
USS Hudson (DD-475)	United States	Destroyer	Damaged	22 April 1945	27°00'N, 127°00'E	Cressman, p 664; DANFS
USS Hugh W. Hadley (DD-774)	United States	Destroyer	Damaged	11 May 1945	26°59'N, 127°32'E	Cressman, p 676; DANFS
USS Hughes (DD-410)	United States	Destroyer	Damaged	10 December 1944	10°15'N, 125°10'E	Cressman, p 590; DANFS
USS Hunt (DD-674)	United States	Destroyer	Damaged	14 April 1945	27°15'N, 130°25'E, off Okinawa	Cressman, p 663; DANFS
USS Hyman (DD-732)	United States	Destroyer	Damaged	6 April 1945	26°45'N, 127°42'E	Cressman, p 656; DANFS
USS Idaho (BB-42)	United States	Battleship	Damaged	12 April 1945	26°26'N, 127°32'E	Cressman, p 661; DANFS
HMS Indefatigable (R10)	United Kingdom	Aircraft carrier	Damaged	1 April 1945	Off Okinawa	Cressman, p 653
USS Indianapolis (CA-35)	United States	Heavy cruiser	Damaged	30 March 1945	26°25'N, 127°30'E, off Okinawa	Cressman, p 651; DANFS
HMS Indomitable (R92)	United Kingdom	Aircraft carrier	Hit	4 May 1945	26°01'N, 237°26'E	Cressman, p 673
USS Ingraham (DD-694)	United States	Destroyer	Damaged	4 May 1945	Off Okinawa	DANFS; DANFS
USS Intrepid (CV-11)	United States	Aircraft carrier	Damaged	29 October 1944	15°07'N, 124°01'E	Cressman, p 567; DANFS
USS Intrepid (CV-11)	United States	Aircraft carrier	Damaged	25 November 1944	15°47'N, 124°14'E	Cressman, p 584; DANFS
USS Intrepid (CV-11)	United States	Aircraft carrier	Damaged	16 April 1945	27°37'N, 131°14'E	Cressman, p 664; DANFS
USS Isherwood (DD-520)	United States	Destroyer	Damaged	22 April 1945	26°14'N, 127°28'E	Cressman, p 664; DANFS
USS J. William Ditter (DM-31) ex DD-751)	United States	Destroyer minelayer	Damaged	6 June 1945	26°14'N,128°01'E	Cressman, p 690; DANFS
USS James O'Hara (APA-90)	United States	Attack personnel transport ship	Damaged	23 November 1944	10°57'N, 125°02'E, off Leyte	Cressman, p 583; Rielly (2010), p 132
USS Jeffers (DMS-27) ex DD-621)	United States	High speed minesweeper (converted destroyer)	Damaged	12 April 1945	26°50'N, 126°35'E	Cressman, p 661; Rielly (2010), p 232
SS Jeremiah M. Daily	United States	"Liberty" cargo ship	Damaged	12 November 1944	11°11'N, 125°05'E, off Leyte	Cressman, p 575; Browning, p 451
SS John Burke	United States	"Liberty" cargo ship	Sunk	28 December 1944	9°1'11"N 123°26'50"E, off Mindoro	Cressman, p 598; Browning, p 470
USS John C. Butler (DE-339)	United States	Destroyer escort	Damaged	20 May 1945	26°47'N, 127°52'E	Cressman, p 673; DANFS
SS John Evans	United States	"Liberty" cargo ship	Damaged	5 December 1944	09°34'N, 127°30'E, San Pedro Bay, Leyte	Cressman, p 588; Browning, p 500
SS Josiah Snelling	United States	"Liberty" cargo ship	Damaged	28 May 1945	Off Okinawa	Cressman, p 685; Browning, p 515
SS Juan de Fuca	United States	"Liberty" cargo ship	Damaged	21 December 1944	Off Panay, ship continues on to Mindoro under own power (see 31 December)	Cressman, p 595; Browning, p 467
USS Kadashan Bay (CVE-76)	United States	Aircraft carrier, escort	Damaged	8 January 1945	15°10'N, 119°08'E	Cressman, p 606; DANFS
USS Kalinin Bay (CVE-68)	United States	Aircraft Carrier, escort	Damaged	25 October 1944	11°10'N, 126°20'E	Cressman, p 563; DANFS
USS Kenneth Whiting (AV-14)	United States	Seaplane Tender	Damaged	21 June 1945	26°10'N, 127°18'E	Cressman, p 701; DANFS
USS Keokuk (AKN-4) ex SS Henry M. Flagler	United States	Net cargo ship	Damaged	21 February 1945	24°36'N, 141°48'E	Cressman, p 627; DANFS
USS Kidd (DD-661)	United States	Destroyer	Damaged	11 April 1945	26°00'N, 130°00'E	Cressman, p 660; DANFS
USS Kimberly (DD-521)	United States	Destroyer	Damaged	25 March 1945	26°02'N, 126°54'E, off Okinawa	Cressman, p 647; DANFS
USS Kitkun Bay (CVE-71)	United States	Aircraft Carrier, escort	Damaged	25 October 1944	11°10'N, 126°20'E	Cressman, p 563; DANFS
USS Kitkun Bay (CVE-71)	United States	Aircraft carrier, escort	Damaged	8 January 1945	15°48'N, 119°09'E	Cressman, p 606; DANFS
SS Kyle V. Johnson	United States	"Liberty" cargo ship	Damaged	12 January 1945	15°12'N, 119°30'E	Cressman, p 609; Browning, p 481
KT-152	Soviet Union	Minesweeper	Sunk	12 August 1945	Off the Kuril Islands	Tokarev, p 68
USS Laffey (DD-724)	United States	Destroyer	Damaged	15 April 1945	27°16'N, 127°50'E, off Okinawa	Cressman, p 663; DANFS
USS La Grange (APA-124)	United States	Attack personnel transport ship	Damaged	13 August 1945	26°14'N, 127°52'E, Buckner Bay, Okinawa	Cressman, p 733; DANFS
USS Lamson (DD-367)	United States	Destroyer	Damaged	7 December 1944	10°28'N, 124°41'E	Cressman, p 589; DANFS
USS LCI(G)-70	United States	Landing craft, infantry (gunboat)	Damaged	5 January 1945	15°36'N, 119°20'E	Cressman, p 604; Turner, p 22; Rielly (2010) p 158
USS LCI-82	United States	Landing craft infantry	Sunk	4 April 1945	Off Okinawa	Cressman, p 654; NavSource
USS LCI(L)-90	United States	Landing craft, infantry, large	Damaged	3 June 1945	26°00'N, 128°00'E	Cressman, p 688; NavSource
USS LCI(G)-365	United States	Landing craft, infantry (gun boat)	Sunk	10 January 1945	16°06'N, 120°14'E	Cressman, p 607; Rielly (2010) p 164
USS LCI(G)-404	United States	Landing craft Infantry (gunboat)	Damaged	8 January 1945	Yoo Passage, Palaus	Cressman, p 606; Rielly (2010) p 161
USS LCI(G)-588	United States	Landing craft, infantry (gun boat)	Damaged	28 March 1945	Off Okinawa	Cressman, p 648; Rielly (2010) p 203-204
USS LCI(L)-600	United States	Landing craft, infantry (large)	Sunk	12 January 1945	Ulithi	NavSource
USS LCI(M)-974	United States	Landing craft, infantry (mortar)	Sunk	10 January 1945	16°06'N, 120°14'E	Cressman, p 607; NavSource
USS LCS(L)(3)-7	United States	Landing craft, support, large (Rocket)	Sunk	16 February 1945	At the entrance to Mariveles harbor	Cressman, p 623; Ball, p 72
USS LCS(L)(3)-15	United States	Landing craft, support (large)	Sunk	22 April 1945	27°20'N, 127°10'E, off Okinawa	NavSource; Rielly (2010) p 246
USS LCS(L)(3)-25	United States	Landing craft, support	Damaged	3 May 1945	26°24'N, 126°15'E, off Okinawa	Cressman, p 672; Rielly (2010) p 255
USS LCS(L)(3)-26	United States	Landing craft, support, large (Rocket)	Sunk	16 February 1945	At the entrance to Mariveles harbor	Ball, p 72; Rielly (2010) p 171
USS LCS(L)(3)-27	United States	Landing craft, support, large (Rocket)	Damaged	16 February 1945	At the entrance to Mariveles harbor	Ball, p 72; Rielly (2010) p 173
USS LCS(L)(3)-33	United States	Landing craft, support (large) (Mk. III)	Damaged	10 April 1945	Radar picket station #1, Okinawa	Ball, p 170
USS LCS(L)(3)-33	United States	Landing craft, support (large) (Mk. III)	Sunk	12 April 1945	26°00'N, 128°00'E	Cressman, p 661; Rielly (2010) p 231; NavSource
USS LCS(L)(3)-36	United States	Landing craft, support (large)	Damaged	9 April 1945	Radar picket station #4, Okinawa	Ball, p 170; Rielly (2010) p 226
USS LCS(L)(3)-37	United States	Landing craft, support (large)	Damaged	9 April 1945	Radar picket station #4, Okinawa	Ball, p 190; Rielly (2010) p 246
USS LCS(L)(3)-37	United States	Landing craft, support (large)	Damaged	28 April 1945	Radar picket station #4, Okinawa	Rielly (2010) p 249
USS LCS(L)(3)-49	United States	Landing craft, support, large (Rocket)	Sunk	16 February 1945	At the entrance to Mariveles harbor	Ball, p 72; Rielly (2010) p 171
USS LCS(L)(3)-51	United States	Landing craft, support (large)	Damaged	6 April 1945	Radar picket station #1, Okinawa	Ball, p 180-181; Rielly (2010) p 231
USS LCS(L)(3)-52	United States	Landing craft, support	Damaged	27 May 1945	Off Okinawa	Ball, p 224; Rielly (2010) p 284
USS LCS(L)(3)-61	United States	Landing craft, support (large)	Damaged	27 May 1945	Radar picket station #15A, Okinawa	Ball, p 180-181; Rielly (2010) p 284
USS LCS(L)(3)-88	United States	Landing craft, support	Damaged	11 May 1945	26°58'N, 127°32'E	Cressman, p 676; Ball, p 210-211; Rielly (2010) p 267
USS LCS(L)(3)-116	United States	Landing craft, support	Damaged	16 May 1945	Off Okinawa	Ball, p 180; Rielly (2010) p 240
USS LCS(L)(3)-119	United States	Landing craft, support, large (Rocket)	Damaged	28 May 1945	26°15'N, 127°51'E	Cressman, p 685; Ball, p 229-230; Rielly (2010) p 286
USS LCS(L)(3)-121	United States	Landing craft, support, large (Rocket)	Damaged	24 May 1945	26°00'N, 127°00'E	Cressman, p 683; Ball p 222
USS LCS(L)(3)-122	United States	Landing craft, support, large (Rocket)	Damaged	11 June 1945	Off Okinawa	Cressman, p 694; Ball, p 234-235; Rielly (2010) pp 291–292
USS LCT-1075	United States	Landing craft, tank	Sunk	10 December 1944	South of Dulag	Cressman, p 590; NavSource; Rielly (2010) p 145
SS Leonidas Merritt	United States	"Liberty" cargo ship	Damaged	12 November 1944	11°11'N, 125°05'E, off Leyte	Cressman, p 575; Browning, p 449; Rielly (2010) p 128
USS LeRay Wilson (DE-414)	United States	Destroyer escort	Damaged	10 January 1945	16°20'N, 120°10'E	Cressman, p 608; DANFS; Rielly (2010) p 163
USS Leutze (DD-481)	United States	Destroyer	Damaged	6 April 1945	26°38'N, 127°28'E	Cressman, p 655; DANFS; Rielly (2010) p 212
SS Lewis L. Dyche	United States	"Liberty" cargo ship	Sunk	4 January 1945	South of Mindoro	Cressman, p 603; Browning, p 475; Rielly (2010) p 156
USS Lexington (CV-16)	United States	Aircraft carrier	Damaged	5 November 1944	16°20'N, 123°59'E	Cressman, p 571; DANFS
USS Liddle (APD-60) ex DE-206	United States	Troop transport (high speed)	Damaged	7 December 1944	10°57'N, 124°35'E	Cressman, p 589; DANFS
USS Lindsey (DM-32) ex DD-771	United States	Light minelayer (converted destroyer)	Damaged	12 April 1945	26°28'N, 127°15'E	Cressman, p 661; DANFS
USS Little (DD-803)	United States	Destroyer	Sunk	3 May 1945	26°24'N, 126°15'E, off Okinawa	Cressman, p 672; DANFS
SS Logan Victory	United States	"Victory" cargo ship	Damaged	6 April 1945	26°10'N, 127°16'E, off Kerama Retto	Cressman, p 656; Browning, pp 499–500
USS Long (DMS-12) ex DD-209	United States	High-speed minesweeper	Sunk	6 January 1945	16°12'N, 120°11'E	Cressman, p 604; DANFS; Rielly (2010) p 160
USS Longshaw (DD-559)	United States	Destroyer	Damaged	7 April 1945	26°29'N, 127°41'E	Cressman, p 658 destroyersonline.com
USS Louisville (CA-28)	United States	Heavy cruiser	Damaged	5 January 1945	15°53'N, 120°00'E	Cressman, p 604; DANFS
USS Louisville (CA-28)	United States	Heavy cruiser	Damaged	6 January 1945	16°37'N, 120°17'E	Cressman, p 604; DANFS
USS Louisville (CA-28)	United States	Heavy cruiser	Damaged	5 June 1945	26°07'N, 127°52'E	Cressman, p 690; DANFS
USS Loy (APD-56) ex DE-160	United States	Troop transport (high speed)	Damaged	27 May 1945	26°30'N, 127°30'E	Cressman, p 684; DANFS
USS LSM-18	United States	Landing ship, medium	Damaged	7 December 1944	10°57'N, 124°35'E	Cressman, p 589
USS LSM-19	United States	Landing ship, medium	Damaged	7 December 1944	10°57'N, 124°35'E	Cressman, p 589
USS LSM-20	United States	Landing ship, medium	Sunk	5 December 1944	10º12'N, 125º19'E	NavSource
USS LSM-23	United States	Landing ship, medium	Damaged	5 December 1944	10º12'N, 125º19'E	Stern, p 93
USS LSM-59	United States	Landing ship, medium	Sunk	21 June 1945	En route to Ie Shima	Cressman, p 701; NavSource
USS LSM-135	United States	Landing ship, medium	Sunk	25 May 1945	26°41'N, 127°47'E	Cressman, p 683; NavSource
USS LSM-188	United States	Landing ship medium	Damaged	28 March 1945	Off Okinawa	Cressman, p 648; NavSource
USS LSM-189	United States	Landing ship, medium (rocket)	Damaged	12 April 1945	Off Okinawa	DANFS; NavSource
USS LSM-190	United States	Landing ship, medium	Sunk	4 May 1945	27°10'N, 127°58'E	Cressman, p 673; Ball, 201-202
USS LSM-194	United States	Landing ship, medium	Sunk	4 May 1945	27°10'N, 127°58'E	Cressman, p 673; Ball, p 203-204
USS LSM-195	United States	Landing ship, medium	Sunk	3 May 1945	26°24'N, 126°15'E, off Okinawa	Cressman, p 672; Ball, p 198
USS LSM-318	United States	Landing ship, medium	Sunk	7 December 1944	10°57'N, 124°35'E	Cressman, p 589; NavSource; Rielly (2010) p 144
USS LST-447	United States	Landing ship, tank	Damaged	6 April 1945	26°09'N, 127°18'E	Cressman, p 656; DANFS
USS LST-447	United States	Landing ship, tank	Sunk	7 April 1945	26°09'N, 127°18'E	Cressman, p 658; Warner p 328; DANFS
USS LST-460	United States	Landing ship, tank	Sunk	21 December 1944	11°13'N, 121°04'E	Cressman, p 595; DANFS; NavSource
USS LST-472	United States	Landing ship, tank	Damaged	15 December 1944	12°19'N, 121°05'E, off southern tip of Mindoro	Cressman, p 592-593; DANFS; NavSource
USS LST-477	United States	Landing ship, tank	Damaged	21 February 1945	24°40'N, 141°44'E	Cressman, p 627
USS LST-534	United States	Landing ship, tank	Damaged	22 June 1945	26°18'N, 127°49'E	Cressman, p 702; DANFS; NavSource
USS LST-599	United States	Landing ship, tank	Damaged	3 April 1945	26°10'N, 127°16'E	Cressman, p 654; DANFS; NavSource
USS LST-610	United States	Landing ship tank	Damaged	10 January 1945	16°20'N, 120°10'E	Cressman, p 607; Rielly (2010) p 164
USS LST-700	United States	Landing ship, tank	Damaged	12 January 1945	14°04'N, 119°25'E	Cressman, p 609; Rielly (2010) p 164
USS LST-724	United States	Landing ship, tank	Damaged	31 March 1945	25°59'N, 127°50'E	Cressman, p 652; Rielly (2010) p 206
USS LST-737	United States	Landing ship, tank	Damaged	7 December 1944	10°57'N, 124°35'E	Cressman, p 589; Rielly (2010) p 144
USS LST-738	United States	Landing ship, tank	Sunk	15 December 1944	12°19'N, 121°05'E, off southern tip of Mindoro	Cressman, p 592-593; DANFS; NavSource
USS LST-749	United States	Landing ship, tank	Sunk	21 December 1944	11°13'N, 121°04'E	Cressman, p 595; DANFS; NavSource
USS LST-750	United States	Landing ship, tank	Sunk	28 December 1944	09°01'N, 122°30'E	Cressma p 598; DANFS; NavSource
USS LST-808	United States	Landing ship, tank	Damaged	20 May 1945	26°42'N, 127°47'E	Cressman, p 673; DANFS; NavSource
USS LST-809	United States	Landing ship, tank	Damaged	21 February 1945	24°08'N, 142°06'E	Cressman, p 627; Rielly (2010) pp 180–181
USS LST-884	United States	Landing ship, tank	Sunk	31 March 1945	25°59'N, 127°50'E	Cressman, p 652; DANFS; Ball, p 157-158
USS LST-925	United States	Landing ship tank	Damaged	9 January 1945	16°20'N, 120°10'E	Cressman, p 607; Rielly (2010) pp 163–164
USS LST-1028	United States	Landing ship tank	Damaged	9 January 1945	16°20'N, 120°10'E	Cressman, p 607
USS Luce (DD-522)	United States	Destroyer	Sunk	4 May 1945	26°35'N,127°10'E	Cressman, p 673; DANFS
USS Lunga Point (CVE-94)	United States	Aircraft carrier, escort	Damaged	21 February 1945	24°40'N, 141°44'E	Cressman, p 627; DANFS; Rielly (2010) p 179
USS Macomb (DMS-23) ex DD-458	United States	High speed minesweeper (converted destroyer)	Damaged	3 May 1945	26°01'N, 126°53'E, off Okinawa	Cressman, p 672; Rielly (2010) p 254
USS Maddox (DD-731)	United States	Destroyer	Damaged	21 January 1945	23°06'N, 122°43'E	Cressman, p 613; Rielly (2010) p 177
USS Mahan (DD-364)	United States	Destroyer	Sunk	7 December 1944	10°50'N, 124°30'E	Cressman, p 589; Rielly (2010) p 140
USS Mahnomen County (LST-912)	United States	Landing ship, tank	Damaged	8 January 1945	16°20'N, 120°10'E, Surigao Straits	Cressman, p 607; DANFS; Rielly (2010) p 162
USS Manila Bay (CVE-61)	United States	Aircraft carrier, escort	Damaged	5 January 1945	14°50'N, 119°10'E	Cressman, p 604; DANFS
USS Mannert L. Abele (DD-733)	United States	Destroyer	Sunk	12 April 1945	27°25'N, 126°59'E, off Okinawa	Cressman, p 661; DANFS
SS Marcus Daly	United States	"Liberty" cargo ship	Damaged	5 December 1944	09°34'N, 127°30'E, San Pedro Bay, Leyte	Cressman, p 588; Browning, p 463
SS Marcus Daly	United States	"Liberty" cargo ship	Damaged	10 December 1944	South of Dulag	Cressman, p 590; Browning, pp 465–466
USS Marcus Island (CVE-77)	United States	Aircraft carrier, escort	Damaged	15 December 1944	off Mindoro	Cressman, p 593; DANFS
SS Mary A. Livermore	United States	"Liberty" cargo ship	Damaged	28 May 1945	26°12'N, 127°46'E, Buckner Bay	Cressman, p 685; Browning, p 514
USS Maryland (BB-46)	United States	Battleship	Damaged	29 November 1944	10°41'N, 125°23'E, In Leyte Gulf	Cressman, p 585; DANFS
USS Maryland (BB-46)	United States	Battleship	Damaged	7 April 1945	26°40'N, 127°29'E	Cressman, p 658; DANFS
SS Matthew P. Deady USAT	United States	"Liberty" cargo ship	Damaged	3 November 1944	Tacloban, Leyte	Cressman, p 571; Browning, p 447
USS Mazama (AE-9)	United States	Ammunition ship	Damaged	12 January 1945	Ulithi	DANFS
SS Minot Victory	United States	"Victory" cargo ship	Damaged	12 April 1945	Off Okinawa	Cressman, pp 661–662; Browning, p 503
USS Mississinewa (AO-59)	United States	Fleet oiler	Sunk	20 November 1944	10°06'N, 139°43'E, Ulithi	Cressman, p 581; DANFS
USS Mississippi (BB-41)	United States	Battleship	Damaged	9 January 1945	16°08'N, 120°18'E	Cressman, p 607; DANFS
USS Mississippi (BB-41)	United States	Battleship	Damaged	5 June 1945	26°09'N, 127°35'E	Cressman, p 690; DANFS
USS Missouri (BB-63)	United States	Battleship	Damaged	11 April 1945	26°00'N, 130°00'E	Cressman, p 660; DANFS
USS Missouri (BB-63)	United States	Battleship	Damaged	16 April 1945	26°00'N, 130°00'E	Cressman, p 664; DANFS
USS Montpelier (CL-57)	United States	Light cruiser	Damaged	27 November 1944	10°50'N, 125°25'E	Cressman, p 585; Rielly (2010) p 136
USS Morris (DD-417)	United States	Destroyer	Damaged	6 April 1945	25°55'N, 127°52'E	Cressman, p 655; DANFS
USS Morrison (DD-560)	United States	Destroyer	Sunk	4 May 1945	27°10'N, 127°58'E	Cressman, p 673; DANFS
SS Morrison R. Waite	United States	"Liberty" cargo ship	Damaged	12 November 1944	11°11'N, 125°05'E, off Leyte	Cressman, p 575; Browning, p 452
USS Mugford (DD-389)	United States	Destroyer	Damaged	5 December 1944	10°15'N, 125°20'E	Cressman, p 588; DANFS
USS Mullany (DD-528)	United States	Destroyer	Damaged	6 April 1945	26°24'N, 128°10'E	Cressman, p 655; DANFS
USS Nashville (CL-43)	United States	Light cruiser	Damaged	13 December 1944	08°57'N, 123°28'E	Cressman, p 592; DANFS
USS Natoma Bay (CVE-62)	United States	Aircraft Carrier, escort	Damaged	7 June 1945	24°46'N, 126°37'E	Cressman, p 691; DANFS
USS Nevada (BB-36)	United States	Battleship	Damaged	26 March 1945	26°20'N, 127°18'E	Cressman, p 648; DANFS
USS New Mexico (BB-40)	United States	Battleship	Damaged	6 January 1945	16°20'N, 120°10'E	Cressman, p 604; DANFS
USS New Mexico (BB-40)	United States	Battleship	Damaged	12 May 1945	26°22'N, 127°43'E	Cressman, p 677; DANFS
USS New York (BB-34)	United States	Battleship	Damaged	14 April 1945	Off Okinawa, 26°00'N, 128°00'E	Cressman, p 662; DANFS
USS Newcomb (DD-586)	United States	Destroyer	Damaged	6 January 1945	16°20'N, 120°10'E	Cressman, p 604; DANFS
USS Newcomb (DD-586)	United States	Destroyer	Damaged	6 April 1945	26°38'N, 127°28'E	Cressman, p 655; DANSF
USS O'Brien (DD-725)	United States	Destroyer	Damaged	6 January 1945	16°23'N, 120°14'E	Cressman, p 604; DANFS
USS O'Brien (DD-725)	United States	Destroyer	Damaged	26 March 1945	26°16'N, 127°26'E	Cressman, p 648; DANFS
USS O'Neill (DE-188)	United States	Destroyer escort	Damaged	25 May 1945	26°20'N, 127°43'E	Cressman, p 683; DANFS
USS Oberrender (DE-344)	United States	Destroyer escort	Damaged	9 May 1945	26°32'N, 127°30'E	Cressman, p 676; DANFS
USS Ommaney Bay (CVE-79)	United States	Aircraft carrier, escort	Sunk	4 January 1945	11°25'N, 121°19'E	Cressman, p 603; DANFS
USS Orca (AVP-49)	United States	Small Seaplane Tender	Damaged	5 January 1945	15°36'N, 119°20'E	Cressman, p 604; DANFS
USS Orestes (AGP-10)	United States	Patrol Craft Tender	Damaged	30 December 1944	12°19'N, 121°04'E	Cressman, p 598; DANFS
SS Otis Skinner	United States	"Liberty" cargo ship	Damaged	12 January 1945	14°42'N, 119°35'E	Cressman, p 609; Browning, pp 479–480
USS Pathfinder (AGS-1)	United States	Survey Ship	Damaged	5 May 1945	26°38'N, 127°53'E, off Okinawa	Cressman, p 676; NOAA
USS Paul Hamilton (DD-590)	United States	Destroyer	Damaged	15 December 1944	12°19'N, 121°02'E	Cressman, p 593
USS PC-1129	United States	Coastal Patrol Craft	Damaged	31 January 1945	14°05'N, 120°30'E	Cressman, p 617; NavSource
USS PC-1603	United States	Coastal Patrol Craft	Damaged	26 May 1945	26°25'N, 127°53'E	Cressman, p 684; NavSource
USS PCS-1396	United States	Coastal Patrol Craft	Damaged	27 May 1945	26°00'N, 128°00'E	Cressman, p 684; NavSource
USS Pinkney (APH-2)	United States	Evacuation transport	Damaged	28 April 1945	26°00'N, 127°00'E	Cressman, p 669; DANFS
USS Porcupine (IX-126)	United States	Auxiliary tanker	Sunk	30 December 1944	12°21'N, 121°02'E	Cressman, p 598; Deck log, USS Bush (DD-529)
USS Porterfield (DD-682)	United States	Destroyer	Damaged	26 March 1945	26°20'N, 127°18'E	Cressman, p 648
USS Prichett (DD-561)	United States	Destroyer	Damaged	28 July 1945	25°43'N, 126°56'E	Cressman, p 722; DANFS
USS Pringle (DD-477)	United States	Destroyer	Damaged	30 December 1944	12°18'N, 121°01'E	Cressman, p 598; DANFS
USS Pringle (DD-477)	United States	Destroyer	Sunk	16 April 1945	27°26'N, 126°59'E, off Okinawa	Cressman, p 664; DANFS
USS PT-84	United States	Patrol torpedo boat	Damaged	17 December 1944	off Mindoro, 12°19'N, 121°04'E	Cressman, p 593; Hyperwar
USS PT-223	United States	Patrol torpedo boat	Damaged	15 December 1944	12°19'N, 121°05'E	Cressman, p 593; Hyperwar
USS PT-300	United States	Patrol torpedo boat	Sunk	18 December 1944	12°19'N, 121°05'E, off Mindoro	Cressman, p 593; DANFS; Hyperwar
USS PT-323	United States	Patrol torpedo boat	Sunk	10 December 1944	10°33'N, 125°14'E	Cressman, p 590; DANFS; Hyperwar
USS Purdy (DD-734)	United States	Destroyer	Damaged	12 April 1945	27°16'N, 127°50'E	Cressman, p 661; DANFS
USS Rall (DE-304)	United States	Destroyer escort	Damaged	12 April 1945	26°36'N, 127°39'E	Cressman, p 661; DANFS
USS Ralph Talbot (DD-390)	United States	Destroyer	Damaged	27 April 1945	26°00'N, 128°00'E, off Okinawa	Cressman, p 669; DANFS
USS Randolph (CV-15)	United States	Aircraft carrier	Damaged	11 March 1945	Ulithi	www.Combined fleet.com DANFS
USS Ransom (AM-283)	United States	Minesweeper	Damaged	6 April 1945	26°48'N, 128°04'E	Cressman, p 655; DANFS
USS Ransom (AM-283)	United States	Minesweeper	Damaged	22 April 1945	26°14'N, 127°28'E	Cressman, p 664; DANFS
USS Rathburne (APD-25) ex DD-113	United States	Troop transport (high speed)	Damaged	27 April 1945	26°26'N, 127°36'E	Cressman, p 669; DANFS
USS Rednour (APD-102) ex DE-592	United States	Troop transport (high speed)	Damaged	27 May 1945	26°29'N, 127°21'E	Cressman, p 684; DANFS
USS Register (APD-92) ex DE-233	United States	Troop transport (high speed)	Damaged	20 May 1945	26°25'N, 127°21'E	Cressman, p 681; DANFS
USS Reid (DD-369)	United States	Destroyer	Sunk	11 December 1944	off Leyte, 09°50'N, 124°55'E	Cressman, p 591; DANFS
USS Reno (CL-96)	United States	Light cruiser	Damaged	14 October 1944	22°48'N, 123°01'E	Cressman, p 554; DANFS
USS Richard P. Leary (DD-664)	United States	Destroyer	Damaged	6 January 1945	16°20'N, 120°10'E	Cressman, p 604; DANFS
USS Richard W. Suesens (DE-342)	United States	Destroyer escort	Damaged	12 January 1945	16°20'N, 120°10'E, off the west coast of Luzon	Cressman, p 609; DANFS
USS Riddle (DE-185)	United States	Destroyer escort	Damaged	12 April 1945	26°00'N, 128°00'E	Cressman, p 661; DANFS
USS Robert H. Smith (DM-23) ex DD-735	United States	Light minelayer (converted destroyer)	Damaged	25 March 1945	26°00'N, 128°00'E	Cressman, p 647; DANFS
USS Robinson (DD-562)	United States	Destroyer	Damaged	10 January 1945	16°06'N, 120°14'E	Cressman, p 607 []
USS Rodman (DMS-21) ex DD-456	United States	High speed minesweeper (converted destroyer)	Damaged	6 April 1945	26°48'N, 128°04'E	Cressman, p 655; DANFS
USS Roper APD-20 ex DD-147	United States	Troop transport (high speed)	Damaged	25 May 1945	26°34'N, 127°36'E	Cressman, p 683; DANFS
SS S. Hall Young USAT	United States	"Liberty" cargo ship	Damaged	29 April 1945	In Nago Bay	Cressman, p 671; Browning, p 509
USS Salamaua (CVE-96)	United States	Aircraft carrier, escort	Damaged	13 January 1945	17°09'N, 119°21'E	Cressman, p 610; DANFS
USS Samuel S. Miles (DE-183)	United States	Destroyer escort	Damaged	11 April 1945	Off Okinawa	DANFS
USS San Jacinto (CVL-30)	United States	Aircraft carrier, light	Damaged	6 April 1945	26°46'N, 129°43'E	Cressman, p 656; DANFS
USS Sandoval (APA-194)	United States	Attack personnel transport ship	Damaged	28 May 1945	26°15'N, 127°51'E	Cressman, p 685; DANFS
USS Sangamon (CVE-26)	United States	Aircraft carrier, escort	Damaged	4 May 1945	26°01'N, 237°26'E	Cressman, p 683; DANFS
USS Santee (CVE-29)	United States	Aircraft Carrier, escort	Damaged	25 October 1944	09°45'N, 126°20'E	Cressman, p 563; DANFS
USS Saratoga (CV-3)	United States	Aircraft carrier	Damaged	21 February 1945	24°56'N, 142°01'E	Cressman, p 627; DANFS
USS Saufley (DD-465)	United States	Destroyer	Damaged	29 November 1944	10°50'N, 125°25'E	Cressman, p 585; DANFS
USS Savo Island (CVE-78)	United States	Aircraft carrier, escort	Damaged	5 January 1945	14°50'N, 119°00'E	Cressman, p 604; DANFS
USS SC-744	United States	Submarine chaser	Sunk	27 November 1944	10°44'N, 125°07'E, Leyte Gulf	Cressman, p 585 []
USS Sederstrom (DE-31)	United States	Destroyer escort	Damaged	22 April 1945	Off Okinawa	DANFS; DANFS
USS Shannon (DM-25) ex DD-737	United States	Light minelayer (converted destroyer)	Damaged	29 April 1945	26°00'N, 127°00'E	Cressman, p 670 []
USS Shea (DM-30) ex DD-750	United States	Light minelayer (converted destroyer)	Damaged	22 April 1945	26°00'N, 127°00'E	Cressman, p 664; DANFS
USS Shea (DM-30) ex DD-750	United States	Light minelayer (converted destroyer)	Damaged	4 May 1945	27°26'N, 126°59'E	Cressman, p 683; DANFS
USS Shubrick (DD-639)	United States	Destroyer	Damaged	29 May 1945	26°38'N, 127°05'E	Cressman, p 686; DANFS
USS Sigsbee (DD-502)	United States	Destroyer	Damaged	14 April 1945	Off Okinawa, 27°15'N, 130°25'E	Cressman, p 662; DANFS
USS Sims (APD-50) ex DE-154	United States	Troop transport (high speed)	Damaged	18 May 1945	26°00'N, 127°00'E	Cressman, p 680; DANFS
USS Sims (APD-50) ex DE-154	United States	Troop transport (high speed)	Damaged	25 May 1945	26°00'N, 127°00'E	Cressman, p 683; DANFS
USS Skirmish (AM-303)	United States	Minesweeper	Damaged	26 March 1945	26°25'N, 127°05'E	Cressman, p 648; DANFS
USS Smith (DD-378)	United States	Destroyer	Damaged	26 October 1944	northwest of the New Hebrides Islands	DANFS
USS Sonoma (AT-12) ex ATO-12	United States	Fleet tug, old	Sunk	24 October 1944	San Pedro Bay, Leyte	Cressman, p 561, DANFS, NavSource
USS Southard (DMS-10) ex (DD-207)	United States	High speed minesweeper (converted destroyer)	Damaged	6 January 1945	16°11'N, 126°16'E	Cressman, p 604; DANFS
USS Southard (DMS-10) ex DD-207	United States	High speed minesweeper (converted destroyer)	Damaged	27 May 1945	26°00'N, 127°00'E	Cressman, p 684; DANFS
USS Spectacle (AM-305)	United States	Minesweeper	Damaged	25 May 1945	26°40'N, 127°52'E	Cressman, p 683; DANFS
USS St. George (AV-16)	United States	Seaplane Tender)	Damaged	5 May 1945	26°10'N, 127°19'E, off Okinawa	Cressman, p 674; DANFS
USS St. Lo (CVE-63)	United States	Aircraft carrier, escort	Sunk	25 October 1944	11°13'N, 126°05'E	Cressman, p 563; NavSource; Wikimapia
USS St. Louis (CL-49)	United States	Light cruiser	Damaged	27 November 1944	10°50'N, 125°25'E	Cressman, p 585; DANFS
USS Stanly (DD-478)	United States	Destroyer	Damaged	12 April 1945	27°12'N, 128°17'E	Cressman, p 661; DANFS
USS Starr (AKA-67) ex SS Star	United States	Attack cargo ship (Built as a Type C2-S-AJ3 ship)	Damaged	9 April 1945	26°20'N, 127°44'E	Cressman, p 659; DANFS
USS Stafford (DE-411)	United States	Destroyer escort	Damaged	5 January 1945	14°00'N, 120°00'E	Cressman, p 604; DANFS
USS Sterett (DD-407)	United States	Destroyer	Damaged	9 April 1945	26°47'N, 128°42'E, picket station #4 off Okinawa	Cressman, p 659; DANFS
USS Stormes (DD-780)	United States	Destroyer	Damaged	25 May 1945	27°06'N, 127°38'E	Cressman, p 683; DANFS
HMS Sussex (96)	United Kingdom	Heavy Cruiser	Damaged	26 July 1945	Off Phuket, Siam	
USS Suwannee (CVE-27)	United States	Aircraft Carrier, escort	Damaged	25 October 1944	09°45'N, 126°42'E	Cressman, p 563; DANFS
USS Swallow (AM-65)	United States	Minesweeper	Sunk	22 April 1945	26°10'N, 127°12'E	Cressman, p 664; DANFS
USS Taluga (AO-62)	United States	Fleet oiler	Damaged	16 April 1945	26°03'N, 127°26'E	Cressman, p 664; DANFS
USS Tatum (APD-81) ex DE-789	United States	Troop transport (high speed)	Damaged	29 May 1945	26°40'N, 127°50'E	Cressman, p 686; DANFS
USS Telfair (APA-210)	United States	Attack personnel transport ship	Damaged	2 April 1945	25°56'N, 127°17'E	Cressman, p 653; DANFS
USS Tennessee (BB-43)	United States	Battleship	Damaged	12 April 1945	26°00'N, 128°00'E	Cressman, p 661; DANFS
USS Terror (CM-5)	United States	minelayer	Damaged	1 May 1945	26°10'N, 127°18'E	Cressman, p 671; DANFS; Rielley (2010), pp 252, 323
USS Thatcher (DD-514)	United States	Destroyer	Damaged	20 May 1945	26°33'N, 127°29'E, off Okinawa	Cressman, p 681; DANFS
USS Thatcher (DD-514)	United States	Destroyer	Damaged	19 July 1945	26°15'N, 127°50'E	Cressman, p 717; DANFS
SS Thomas Nelson	United States	"Liberty" cargo ship	Damaged	12 November 1944	11°11'N, 125°05'E, off Leyte	Cressman, p 575; Browning, p 450
USS Ticonderoga (CV-14)	United States	Aircraft carrier	Damaged	21 January 1945	22°40'N, 122°57'E	Cressman, p 613; DANFS
USS Twiggs (DD-591)	United States	Destroyer	Damaged	28 April 1945	27°12'N, 128°16'E	Cressman, p 669; DANFS
USS Twiggs (DD-591)	United States	Destroyer	Sunk	16 June 1945	off Senaga Shima	Cressman, p 695; DANFS
USS Tyrrell (AKA-80) ex SS Tyrrel	United States	Attack cargo ship Built as a type C2-S-AJ3 ship	Damaged	2 April 1945	26°21'N, 127°45'E	Cressman, p 653; DANFS
USS Underhill (DE-682)	United States	Destroyer escort	Sunk	24 July 1945	off Luzon, 19°20'N, 126°42'E	Cressman, p 719; DANFS
USS Vammen (DE-644)	United States	Destroyer escort	Damaged	1 April 1945	26°18'N, 127°29'E	Cressman, p 652; DANFS
HMS Vestal (J215)	United Kingdom	Minesweeper	Sunk	26 July 1945	7°05'N 97°50'E; Off Phuket, Siam	
HMS Victorious (R38)	United Kingdom	Aircraft carrier	Damaged	4 May 1945	Off Okinawa	NAVAL-HISTORY.NET
HMS Victorious (R38)	United Kingdom	Aircraft carrier	Damaged	9 May 1945	Off Okinawa	Cressman, p 676; NAVAL-HISTORY.NET
USS Wadsworth (DD-516)	United States	Destroyer	Damaged	22 April 1945	26°10'N, 126°24'E	Cressman, p 664; DANFS
USS Wadsworth (DD-516)	United States	Destroyer	Damaged	28 April 1945	26°47'N, 126°38'E, off Okinawa	Cressman, p 669; DANFS
USS Wake Island (CVE-65)	United States	Aircraft carrier, escort	Damaged	3 April 1945	26°05'N, 128°57'E, off Okinawa	Cressman, p 654; DANFS
USS Walke (DD-723)	United States	Destroyer	Damaged	6 January 1945	16°40'N, 120°10'E	Cressman, p 605; DANFS
USS Walter C. Wann (DE-412)	United States	Destroyer escort	Damaged	12 April 1945	26°17'N, 127°20'E	Cressman, p 661; DANFS
SS Walter Colton	United States	"Liberty" cargo ship	Damaged	11 June 1945	off Okinawa	Cressman, p 694; Browning, p 517
USS War Hawk (AP-168)	United States	Personnel Transport Ship	Damaged	9 January 1945	16°20'N, 120°10'E	Cressman, p 607; DANFS
USS War Hawk (AP-168)	United States	Personnel Transport Ship	Damaged	10 January 1945	16°06'N, 120°14'E	Cressman, p 607; DANFS
USS Ward (APD-16) ex DD-139	United States	Troop transport (high speed)	Sunk	7 December 1944	10°51'N, 124°33'E	Cressman, p 589; DANFS
USS Wesson (DE-184)	United States	Destroyer escort	Damaged	7 April 1945	26°48'N, 127°55'E	Cressman, p 658; DANFS
USS West Virginia (BB-48)	United States	Battleship	Damaged	1 April 1945	26°20'N, 127°40'E	Cressman, p 652; DANFS
USS White Plains (CVE-66)	United States	Aircraft carrier, escort	Damaged	25 October 1944	off Samar	DANFS; DANFS
USS Whitehurst (DE-634)	United States	Destroyer escort	Damaged	12 April 1945	26°04'N, 127°12'E	Cressman, p 661; DANFS
SS William A. Coulter	United States	"Liberty" cargo ship	Damaged	12 November 1944	11°11'N, 125°05'E, off Leyte	Cressman, p 575; Browning, p 451
USS William C. Cole (DE-641)	United States	Destroyer escort	Damaged	24 May 1945	26°45'N, 127°52'E	Cressman, p 682-683; DANFS
USS William D. Porter (DD-579)	United States	Destroyer	Sunk	10 June 1945	27°06'N, 127°38'E	Cressman, p 693; DANFS
SS William S. Ladd	United States	"Liberty" cargo ship	Sunk	10 December 1944	South of Dulag	Cressman, p 590; Browning, pp 465–466
SS William Sharon	United States	"Liberty" cargo ship	Damaged	28 December 1944	Off Mindoro	Cressman, p 598; Browning, pp 469–70
USS Wilson (DD-408)	United States	Destroyer	Damaged	4 April 1945	Off southern end of Kerama Retto	Cressman, p 655; DANFS
USS Wilson (DD-408)	United States	Destroyer	Damaged	15 April 1945	26°03'N, 127°20'E, off Okinawa	Cressman, p 663; DANFS
USS Witter (DE-636)	United States	Destroyer escort	Damaged	6 April 1945	26°04'N, 127°52'E	Cressman, p 655; DANFS
USS YDG-10	United States	Degaussing vessel	Damaged	27 May 1945	26°00'N, 128°00'E	Cressman, p 684 []
USS YMS-81	United States	Motor Minesweeper	Damaged	7 April 1945	26°35'N, 127°53'E	Cressman, p 658 []
USS YMS-311	United States	Motor minesweeper	Damaged	6 April 1945	26°38'N, 127°48'E	Cressman, p 655 []
USS YMS-321	United States	Motor minesweeper	Damaged	6 April 1945	26°00'N, 128°00'E	Cressman, p 655 []
USS YMS-327	United States	Motor minesweeper	Damaged	4 May 1945	26°32'N, 126°58'E	Cressman, p 673 []
USS YMS-331	United States	Motor minesweeper	Damaged	15 April 1945	26°15'N, 127°36'E	Cressman, p 663 []
USS Zeilin (APA-3)	United States	Attack personnel transport ship	Damaged	12 January 1945	15°23'N, 119°25'E	Cressman, p 609; DANFS
USS Zellars (DD-777)	United States	Destroyer	Damaged	12 April 1945	26°00'N, 128°00'E	Cressman, p 661; DANFS

== Bibliography ==
- LCI: Landing Craft Infantry, Volume II. Turner Publishing. 1995. ISBN 1-56311-262-0.
- Ball, Donald L. (1997). Fighting Amphibs; The LCS(L) in World War II. Williamsburgh, VA: Mill Neck Publications. ISBN 0-9659055-0-0.
- Browning Jr., Robert M. (1996). US Merchant Vessel War Casualties of World War II. Annapolis, Maryland: Naval Institute Press. ISBN 978-1-55750-087-8.
- Cressman, Robert J. (1999). The Official Chronology of the U.S. Navy in World War II. Naval Historical Center Contemporary History Branch.
- Masterson, Dr. James R. (October 1949). U. S. Army Transportation, In The Southwest Pacific Area. US Army: Transportation Unit Historical Division Special Staff.
- Rielly, Robin L. (2008). Kamikazes, Corsairs, and Picket Ships. Havertown, PA: Casemare. ISBN 978-1-935149-41-5.
- Rielly, Robin L. (2010). Kamikaze Attacks of World War II. Jefferson, North Carolina: McFarland & Company, Inc. ISBN 978-0-7864-4654-4.
- Watts, Anthony J. (1967). Japanese Warships of World War II. Doubleday & Company.
- Zaloga, Steven J. (2010). Defense of Japan. Oxford, UK: Osprey Publishing. ISBN 978-1-84603-687-3.
- Ships' Data US Naval Vessels Vol I 250-010. Navships. April 15, 1945.
- Ships' Data US Naval Vessels Vol II 250-011. Navships. April 15, 1945.
- Ships' Data US Naval Vessels Vol III 250-012. Navships. April 15, 1945.
- Casualties: U.S. Navy and Coast Guard Vessels, Sunk or Damaged Beyond Repair during World War II 7 December 1941-1 October 1945. Department Of The Navy: Naval History And Heritage Command.
- Stern, Robert L. (2010). Fire From the Sky: Surviving the Kamikaze Threat. Pen and Sword. ISBN 978-1-4738-1421-9.
- Tokarev, Maksim (2014). "Kamikazes: The Soviet Legacy". Naval War College Review. 67 (1): 68. ISSN 0028-1484.
