= Kamikaze boat =

Kamikaze boat is a vessel used in naval military operations to strike enemy ships in suicidal attacks.

== See also ==
- Shinyo (suicide motorboat)
- GARC - Global Autonomous Reconnaissance Craft
- GARK - Ghost-controlled Autonomous Robotic Kits
