= USS Pickens =

United States Navy attack transport

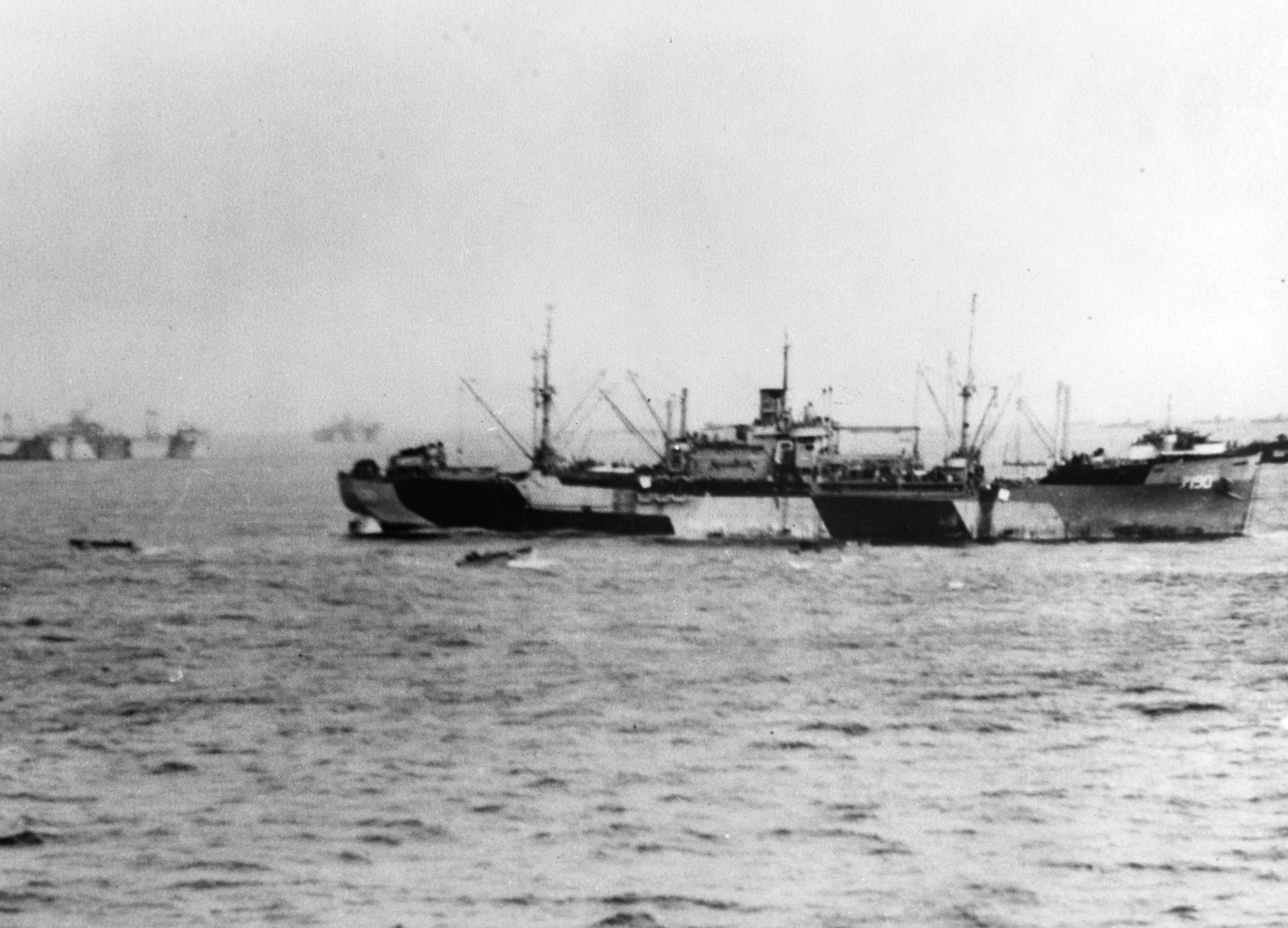

History

United States
- Name: USS Pickens
- Namesake: Pickens County, Alabama; Pickens County, Georgia; Pickens County, South Carolina
- Ordered: as type VC2-S-AP5; MCV hull 658
- Laid down: 22 April 1944
- Launched: 21 July 1944
- Acquired: 18 September 1944
- Commissioned: 18 September 1944
- Decommissioned: 12 April 1946
- Stricken: 1 May 1946
- Fate: Sold for scrapping, 9 April 1973

General characteristics
- Displacement: 14,833 (full load)
- Length: 455 ft 0 in (138.68 m)
- Beam: 62 ft 0 in (18.90 m)
- Draught: 28 ft 1 in (8.56 m)
- Speed: 17 knots
- Capacity: 150,000 cu. ft, 2,900 tons
- Complement: 56 Officers 480 Enlisted
- Armament: one 5 in (130 mm) gun mount, twelve 40 mm gun mounts, ten 20 mm gun mounts

USS Pickens (APA-190) was a Haskell-class attack transport in service with the United States Navy from 1944 to 1946. She was scrapped in 1973.

== History ==
Pickens was built under United States Maritime Commission contract (MCV hull 658), was laid down by the Kaiser Shipbuilding Co., Vancouver, Washington, 22 April 1944; launched 21 July 1944; sponsored by Mrs. Howard Denhart; delivered to the Navy and commissioned 18 September 1944.

=== World War II ===
Following shakedown, Pickens steamed west, engaged in amphibious training in Hawaiian waters, and on 27 January 1945, got underway for the western Pacific Ocean with elements of the 4th Marine Division embarked. A unit of TransDiv 45, she arrived off Iwo Jima on the morning of 19 February. Despite cold weather and high seas, she stood off the assault beach, 0730–1800, to land 2nd Battalion 25th Marines and their assigned Shore Party D Co. 133 Naval Construction Battalion. Retiring at night, she returned daily to continue offloading cargo and to take on casualties. On 28 February 1945, she got underway for Saipan, thence to Guam to disembark her casualty passengers.

For the next month Pickens, with 2nd Division Marines embarked, rehearsed for Operation Iceberg. On 27 March 1945, she departed the Marianas and on 1 April participated in the diversionary landings on Okinawa's southeastern coast, during which she assumed duties of Division Commander (TransDiv 44) after USS Hinsdale (APA-120) was kamikazed. She effected the rescue of survivors from that APA, LST-884, and LST-724. On 2 April, she repeated the feint, then swung around to the stand-by area where she remained until 9 April. Pickens then returned to Saipan, and on 14 April debarked her troops.

On 4 June 1945, Pickens sailed for Nouméa, whence she carried cargo back to the Marianas before heading back to California and availability. Arriving at San Francisco, California, 3 August, she completed availability after the end of the war and at the end of the month joined others of her type in carrying occupation troops to the Far East and bringing back veterans. She completed "Operation Magic Carpet" duty at San Francisco 7 January 1946, then got underway for the U.S. East Coast and inactivation.

=== Decommissioning and fate ===
Decommissioned at Norfolk, Virginia, 12 April 1946, she was redelivered to the United States Maritime Commission 18 April; and on 1 May her name was struck from the Navy List. Through 1970, she remained with the National Defense Reserve Fleet, laid up at the James River, Virginia berthing area in Lee Hall, Virginia. She was sold for scrapping to Union Minerals & Alloys Corp. on 9 April 1973 (PD-X-956, dated 5 March 1973) for $111,500.00., and was delivered on 7 September 1973.

== Awards ==
Pickens earned two battle stars during World War II.
