= USS LST-925 =

1944 LST-542-class tank landing ship

History

United States
- Name: LST-925
- Builder: Bethlehem-Hingham Shipyard, Hingham, Massachusetts
- Yard number: 3395
- Laid down: 10 May 1944
- Launched: 21 June 1944
- Commissioned: 15 July 1944
- Decommissioned: 26 November 1945
- Stricken: 5 December 1945
- Identification: Hull symbol: LST-925; Code letters: NVOW
- Honors and awards: 1 × battle star
- Fate: Sold for scrapping, 9 May 1948

General characteristics
- Class & type: LST-542-class tank landing ship
- Displacement: 1,625 long tons (1,651 t) (light); 4,080 long tons (4,145 t) (full (seagoing draft with 1,675 short tons (1,520 t) load); 2,366 long tons (2,404 t) (beaching)
- Length: 328 ft (100 m) oa
- Beam: 50 ft (15 m)
- Draft: Unloaded: 2 ft 4 in (0.71 m) forward; 7 ft 6 in (2.29 m) aft; Full load: 8 ft 3 in (2.51 m) forward; 14 ft 1 in (4.29 m) aft; Landing with 500 short tons (450 t) load: 3 ft 11 in (1.19 m) forward; 9 ft 10 in (3.00 m) aft; Limiting 11 ft 2 in (3.40 m); Maximum navigation 14 ft 1 in (4.29 m)
- Installed power: 2 × 900 hp (670 kW) Electro-Motive Diesel 12-567A diesel engines; 1,800 shp (1,300 kW)
- Propulsion: 1 × Falk main reduction gears; 2 × Propellers
- Speed: 11.6 kn (21.5 km/h; 13.3 mph)
- Range: 24,000 nmi (44,000 km; 28,000 mi) at 9 kn (17 km/h; 10 mph) while displacing 3,960 long tons (4,024 t)
- Boats & landing craft carried: 2 x LCVPs
- Capacity: 1,600–1,900 short tons (3,200,000–3,800,000 lb; 1,500,000–1,700,000 kg) cargo depending on mission
- Troops: 16 officers, 147 enlisted men
- Complement: 13 officers, 104 enlisted men
- Armament: Varied, ultimate armament; 2 × twin 40 mm (1.57 in) Bofors guns; 4 × single 40 mm Bofors guns; 12 × 20 mm (0.79 in) Oerlikon cannons

Service record
- Part of: LST Flotilla 6
- Operations: Lingayen Gulf landings (9 January 1945)
- Awards: American Campaign Medal; Asiatic–Pacific Campaign Medal; World War II Victory Medal; Philippine Liberation Medal

USS LST-925 was an LST-542-class tank landing ship in the United States Navy. Like many of her class, she was not named and is properly referred to by her hull designation.

== Construction ==
LST-925 was laid down on 10 May 1944, at Hingham, Massachusetts, by the Bethlehem-Hingham Shipyard; launched on 21 June 1944; and commissioned on 15 July 1944.

== Service history ==
During World War II, LST-925 was assigned to the Asiatic-Pacific theater. She took part in the Lingayen Gulf landings in January 1945. In the early hours of 10 January she was damaged by Japanese Army Shin'yō-class suicide motorboats in Lingayen Gulf and beached on "Orange Beach" to avoid sinking.

She returned to the United States and was decommissioned on 26 November 1945, and struck from the Navy list on 5 December, that same year. On 9 May 1948, the ship was sold to Consolidated Builders Inc., Seattle, Washington, for scrapping.

== Awards ==
LST-925 earned one battle star for World War II service.

== Bibliography ==
Online resources

- "LST-925". Dictionary of American Naval Fighting Ships. Naval History and Heritage Command. This article incorporates text from this source, which is in the public domain.
- "Bethlehem-Hingham, Hingham MA". www.ShipbuildingHistory.com. 11 August 2011.
- "USS LST-925". NavSource. 26 September 2015.
