= SS Francisco Morazan =

Several ships have been named Francisco Morazan.

- SS Francisco Morazan (1922), a cargo ship wrecked on South Manitou Island in the Great Lakes in 1960.
- SS Francisco Morazan (1944), a Liberty ship

== See also ==
- FNH General Francisco Morazán (1402), a coastal patrol vessel in the Honduran Navy
