= USS PC-1129 =

Submarine chaser of the US Navy

Coordinates: 14.05°N 120.30°E

History

United States
- Name: PC-1129
- Builder: Defoe Shipbuilding Company, Bay City, Michigan
- Laid down: 23 September 1942
- Launched: 7 December 1942
- Commissioned: 3 June 1943
- Stricken: 23 February 1945
- Honors and awards: one battle star
- Fate: Sunk, 31 January 1945

General characteristics
- Class & type: PC-461-class submarine chaser
- Displacement: 295 tons (Light) 450 tons (Full)
- Length: 173 feet, 8 inches
- Beam: 23 feet
- Draft: 10 feet, 10 inches
- Propulsion: Two 1,440bhp General Motors 16-258S diesel engines, Farrel-Birmingham single reduction gear, two shafts.
- Speed: 20.2 knots
- Complement: 65 men
- Armament: One 3"/50 dual purpose gun mount; one 40mm gun mount; three 20mm guns; two rocket launchers; four depth charge projectors; two depth charge tracks

USS PC-1129 was a PC-461-class submarine chaser built for the United States Navy during World War II. She was sunk by a Japanese suicide boat in January 1945 in the South China Sea.

== Construction and service ==
Laid down as a PC-461 Class Submarine chaser at Defoe Shipbuilding of Bay City, Michigan on 23 September 1942, PC-1129 was commissioned into U.S. Navy service on 3 June 1943 as a member of the U.S. Atlantic Fleet. After clearing the Great Lakes and entering the Mississippi River, PC-1129 steamed to New Orleans where she joined a convoy of westbound amphibious craft and stood out for the Panama Canal.

International radio call sign of USS PC-1129
November	Golf	Papa	Bravo

Joining the U.S. Pacific Fleet at Balboa, PC-1129 began regular convoy escort assignments between the Panama Canal and San Diego, eventually taking up the San Diego-Pearl Harbor route during the later months of 1943.

Operating out of Pearl Harbor through late 1944, PC-1129 escorted American naval and merchant convoys between Hawaii and destinations throughout the South Pacific before she shifted her homeport to the rear-area base at Seeadler Harbor, Manus Island, northern Papua New Guinea, which served as a marshaling point for men, material and supplies for the Philippine Invasion. PC-1129 spent much of the fall of 1944 escorting convoys between the Leyte beachhead and Manus. As Allied forces advanced into the Philippine archipelago, PC-1129 began to operate out of Leyte Gulf, where her anti-submarine and anti-aircraft capabilities were in demand.

Escorting invasion and resupply convoys between Leyte and the front lines through December 1944, PC-1129 and her crew became aware of the Japanese doctrine of Kamikaze attacks and spent these deployments at general quarters. After seeing several convoys to their destinations, PC-1129 received orders in January 1945 calling for her support in the 11th Airborne Division’s mission to secure the city of Nasugbu and escort a formation of landing craft carrying the 188th Infantry Regiment to their landing beaches. Departing Leyte in escort on 29 January, PC-1129 screened her charges to their destination and as the aerial and amphibious assault commenced on 31 January, she stood offshore to provide fire support. As darkness fell and the ground forces moved inland, PC-1129 moved further offshore to open water for the night.

In a screening position, PC-1129 was called to general quarters when fast-moving surface contacts were detected on radar. Moving to intercept, PC-1129 joined with other subchasers, destroyer escorts and destroyers in a night firefight against a force of over 20 Shin'yō suicide boats, each one capable of speeds over 30 knots and armed with a bow-mounted charge of 300 kg (660 lb) of explosives. Though several of the enemy craft were destroyed in the exchange of fire, two by PC-1129, one crashed into her aft starboard side.

The resulting detonation blew open an enormous hole in the PC-1129’s hull, in addition to knocking out her propellers and steering. Many of her crew were blown into the water from her decks by the blast, and she began to sink by the stern. Fires broke out on and around her and were fed by diesel fuel from her damaged tanks, leaving her illuminated. With several more Shin'yō craft operating in the area, PC-1129’s Captain ordered his ship abandoned shortly before 2200hrs and she sank stern-first on 31 January 1945, with two crew killed.

She was struck from the Navy List on 23 February 1945.

PC-1129 was one of three major ships built at Defoe Shipbuilding Company that were lost during World War II, the others were USS Rich (DE-695) and the United States Coast Guard Cutter Escanaba (WPG-77).

She received one battle star for her service.
