= USS SC-744 =

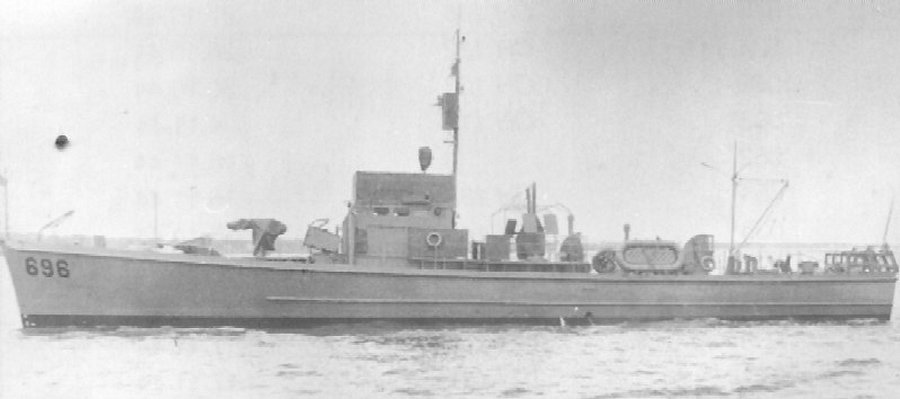
- Sister ship, USS SC-696, sunk in 1943 by German bombers.

History

United States
- Name: SC-744
- Ordered: 16 February 1942
- Builder: Quincy Adams Yacht Yard Inc.
- Laid down: 18 February 1942
- Launched: 23 May 1942
- Commissioned: 10 July 1942
- Fate: Sunk by Kamikaze, 27 November 1944

General characteristics
- Displacement: 148 tons
- Length: 110 feet, 10 inches
- Beam: 17 feet
- Draft: 6 feet, 6 inches
- Propulsion: 2 x General Motors 8-268A diesel engines or 2 x General Motors 16-184A diesel "pancake" engines, two screws.
- Speed: 15.6 knots
- Range: 1,500 nautical miles at 12 knots
- Complement: 3 Officers, 24 Enlisted
- Armament: One 40mm mount; two .50 Caliber Machine Guns; two "Y" Gun Depth Charges

USS SC-744 was an SC-497-Class submarine chaser of the United States Navy during World War II. She was sunk by a Japanese Kamikaze in 1944.

== Ship History ==
SC-744 was ordered and laid down in Quincy, Massachusetts on 16 and 18 February 1942. By May, she was launched, and then commissioned as PC-744 in July. In April 1943, she was re-designated as SC-744. She was assigned to the Task Force 70.1, U.S. 7th Fleet in the Pacific Theatre.

=== Sinking ===
At 0713 hours, SC-744 got underway from San Pedro Bay, Philippines to escort a ship and high octane gasoline barge to Liloan, Philippines. She cleared the harbor at 0829 hours.

At 1130 hours, she intercepted a distress call from the USS Mount McKinley stating she was under heavy air attack. The officer of the deck witnessed anti-aircraft fire and explosions eight miles off the port quarter. The ship immediately went to general quarters. The engines were brought to 12 knots and she began "zig zagging" in front of the convoy as evasive action. At 1157 hours, a Mitsubishi A6M Zero out-turned a Lockheed P-38 Lightning and began an attack run on the vessel. At that point the crew began 40mm, 20mm, and 12.7mm anti-aircraft fire. The Captain ordered left rudder and the Zero opened fire at 1500 yards away. At 500 yards, the plane dropped a small bomb which exploded in the water. Shortly after the plane, damaged by gunfire, slammed into the stern of the ship on the port side near the galley hatch. The explosion wounded six men and killed another. The Zero was completely destroyed and the pilot killed.

USS SC-749 arrived at the scene at 1430 hours after the crew set off red smoke pots lent from another assisting vessel. At 1700 hours, she was taken into tow and arrived at Tacloban, Philippines. She sunk while moored on 30 November 1944 while undergoing salvage operations in four fathoms of water.

She was struck from the Navy List on 19 January 1945.

=== Decorations ===
SC-744 received one battle star for her service.

- Asiatic-Pacific Campaign Medal
- American Campaign Medal
