= SS Benjamin Ide Wheeler =

World War II Liberty ship of the United States

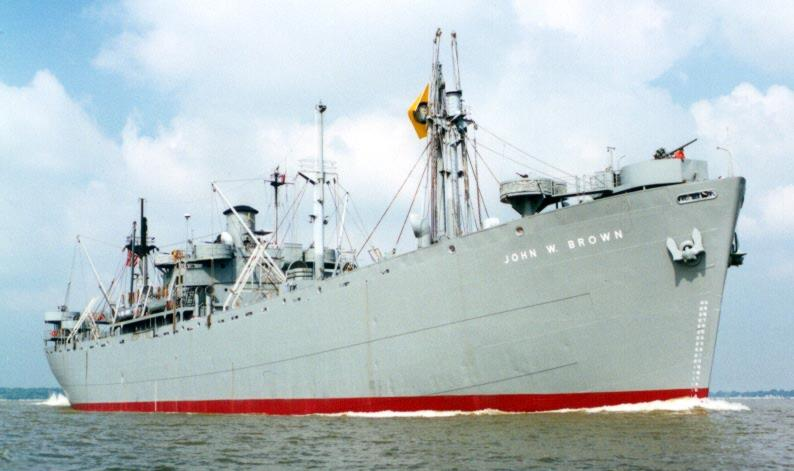
- SS John W Brown, a ship of the same class as the Benjamin Ide Wheeler

History

United States
- Name: Benjamin Ide Wheeler
- Namesake: Benjamin Ide Wheeler
- Owner: United States Maritime Commission (USMC)
- Builder: California Shipbuilding Corp.; Los Angeles, California
- Laid down: 28 October 1942
- Launched: 27 November 1942
- Completed: 17 December 1942
- Fate: Scrapped 1948 as sinking and refloated

General characteristics
- Class & type: Liberty ship; type EC2-S-C1, standard
- Tonnage: 7,000 LT DWT
- Length: 441 feet 6 inches (135 m) oa; 416 feet (127 m) pp; 427 feet (130 m) lwl
- Beam: 57 feet (17 m)
- Draft: 27 ft 9.25 in (8.4646 m)
- Propulsion: 1 × triple-expansion steam engine, 1 × screw propeller
- Speed: 11.5 knots (21.3 km/h; 13.2 mph)
- Capacity: 562,608 cubic feet (15,931 m^{3}) (grain); 499,573 cubic feet (14,146 m^{3}) (bale)
- Complement: 38–62 USMM; 21–40 USNAG
- Armament: Varied by ship; Bow-mounted 3-inch (76 mm)/50-caliber gun; Stern-mounted 4-inch (102 mm)/50-caliber gun; 2–8 × single 20-millimeter (0.79 in) Oerlikon anti-aircraft (AA) cannons and/or, 2–8 × 37-millimeter (1.46 in) M1 AA guns

SS Benjamin Ide Wheeler was a Liberty ship, a cargo ship during World War II. Built by California Shipbuilding Corporation (Calship) of Los Angeles for the United States Maritime Commission (USMC). Benjamin Ide Wheeler was Calship's 100th ship built. She was sponsored and christened by Mrs. Robert Gordon Sproul, wife of Robert Gordon Sproul President of the University of California system. She was named after Benjamin Ide Wheeler President of the University of California from 1899 to 1919. Her Hull # was 675, she was type EC2-S-C1 ship, built in 50 days as part of the Emergency Shipbuilding Program. Her keel was laid down on 28 October 1942, launched on 27 November 1942 and delivered on 17 December 1942. She was assigned to American-Hawaiian Steamship Company of San Francisco for merchant operation by the War Shipping Administration (WSA).

== World War II ==
Benjamin Ide Wheeler departed San Francisco on 27 January 1944 with war dogs for India. Wheeler arrived at Calcutta on 6 April 1944. Some of the dogs were sent to Burma. The dogs were used by the United States Marine Corps and US Army. The US Army's Veterinary Service cared for the dogs on the ship and at arrival.

Benjamin Ide Wheeler continued from India with her other cargo and passengers: 267 Army Engineers with all their gear, including high explosives and gasoline.

Benjamin Ide Wheeler continued from India to the Philippines, to be part of the supply ships that supported the Battle of Leyte from 7 October to 26 December 1944 in the Pacific war campaign. Before she could drop anchor at Leyte Gulf, Empire of Japan planes started attacking her. SS Benjamin Ide Wheeler's United States Navy Armed Guards had to man the ship's deck guns 353 times in 76 days. But on 27 October 1944 a Kamikaze Zero plane dive-bomber already hit and smoking crashed down into one of her cargo holds. The plane and its aerial bomb exploded and sank the ship in 36 feet of water, the United States Navy Armed Guard were able to continue to defend, as the deck guns were above the waterline. It is reported that they shot down four planes that day. One Seaman and Armed Guard were killed in the explosion. Earle Woodring received a Bronze Star Medal for his actions.

She was refloated and use as a stationary depot ship at Leyte. She was not repaired and was scrapped after the war in 1948.

== See also ==
- Allied technological cooperation during World War II
- List of Liberty ships
- Type C1 ship
- Type C2 ship
- Victory ship
- U.S. Merchant Marine Academy
