= USS LSM-19 =

LSM-1-class landing ship medium

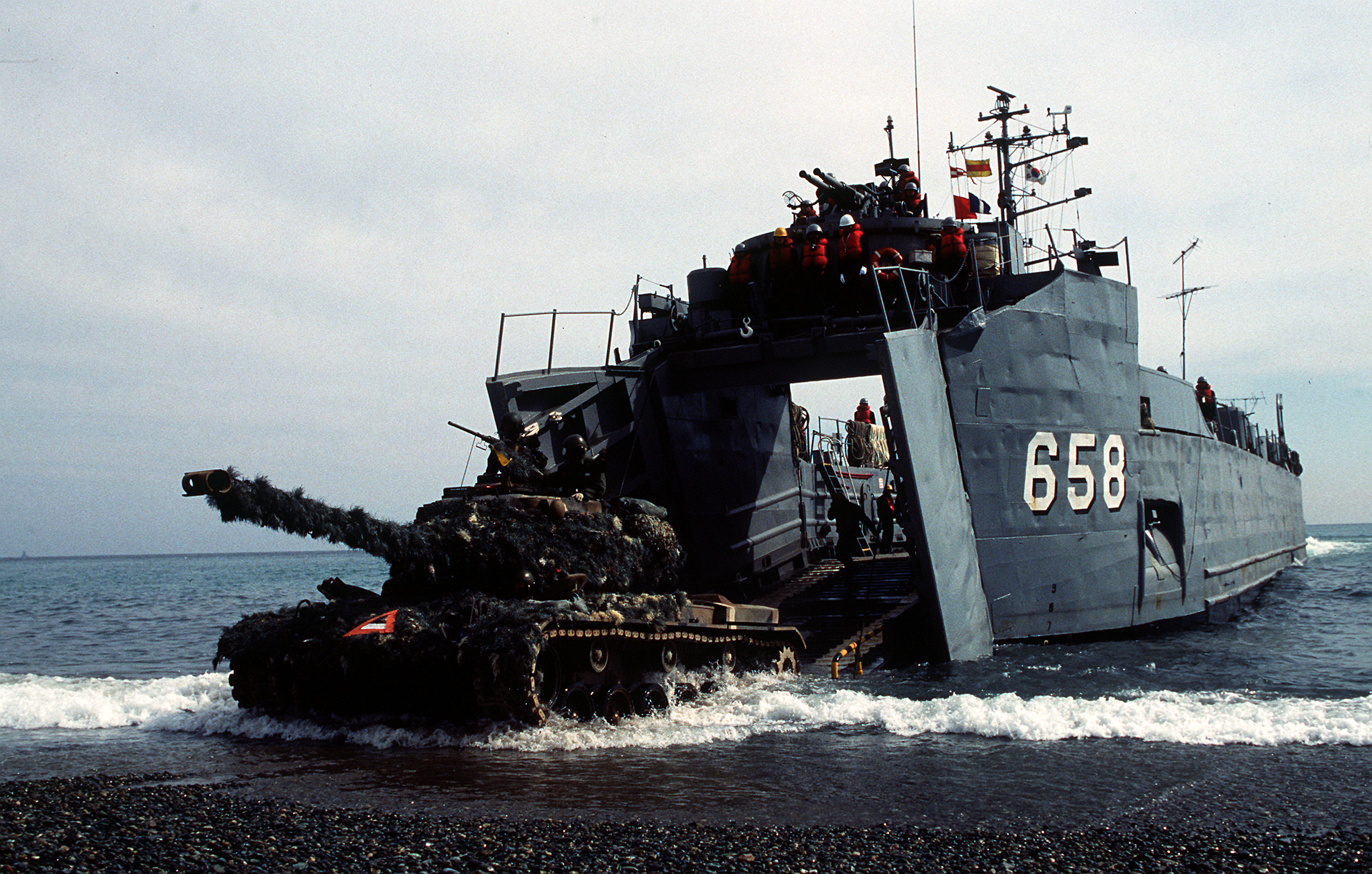
- ROKS Girin on 1 January 1991

History

United States
- Name: LSM-19
- Builder: Brown Shipbuilding Co., Houston
- Laid down: 24 April 1944
- Launched: 14 May 1944
- Commissioned: 15 June 1944
- Decommissioned: 1 July 1946
- Stricken: 15 November 1974
- Identification: Callsign: NVBK
- Honors and awards: See Awards
- Fate: Transferred to South Korea, 3 July 1956

History

South Korea
- Name: Girin; (기린)
- Namesake: Girin
- Acquired: 3 July 1956
- Decommissioned: 28 February 1999
- Reclassified: LSM-658
- Identification: Pennant number: LSM-610
- Fate: Unknown

General characteristics
- Class & type: LSM-1-class landing ship medium
- Displacement: 520 long tons (528 t) light; 743 long tons (755 t) landing; 1,095 long tons (1,113 t) full load
- Length: 203 ft 6 in (62.03 m) o/a
- Beam: 34 ft 6 in (10.52 m)
- Draft: 3 ft 6 in (1.07 m) forward; 7 ft 8 in (2.34 m) aft; Fully loaded : 6 ft 4 in (1.93 m) forward; 8 ft 3 in (2.51 m) aft
- Propulsion: 2 × Fairbanks-Morse (model 38D81/8X10, reversible with hydraulic clutch) diesels. Direct drive with 1,440 bhp (1,074 kW) each @ 720 rpm, twin screws
- Speed: 13.2 knots (15.2 mph; 24.4 km/h)
- Range: 4,900 nmi (9,100 km) at 12 kn (22 km/h)
- Capacity: 5 medium or 3 heavy tanks, or 6 LVTs, or 9 DUKWs
- Troops: 2 officers, 46 enlisted
- Complement: 5 officers, 54 enlisted
- Armament: 6 × 20 mm AA gun mounts
- Armour: 10-lb. STS splinter shield to gun mounts, pilot house and conning station

USS LSM-19 was a LSM-1-class landing ship medium in the United States Navy during World War II. She was later sold to South Korean Navy as ROKS Girin (LSM-610).

== Construction and career ==
LSM-19 was laid down on 24 April 1944 at Brown Shipbuilding Co., Houston, Texas. Launched on 14 May 1944 and commissioned on 15 June 1944.

=== Service in the United States ===
During World War II, LSM-19 was assigned to the Asiatic-Pacific theater. She took part in the Leyte landing from 20 October to 29 November 1944 and the Ormoc Bay landings from 7 to 8 December 1944. During her Leyte landing, one of the ship's crew was killed which earned him a Purple Heart on 23 October 1944.

She participated in the Lingayen Gulf landing from 16 to 18 January 1945, Mariveles-Corregidor from 14 to 28 February 1945, Mindanao Island landings on several occasions (10 March 1945, 17 to 23 April 1945, and 10 to 16 May 1945) and Balikpapan Operations from 26 June to 6 July 1945.

LSM-19 was decommissioned on 1 July 1946 at Astoria, Oregon and was put into the Columbia River Pacific Reserve Fleet following the end of her service and later loaned to South Korea.

She was struck from the Navy Register.

=== Service in South Korea ===
ROKS Girin was acquired by the South Korean Navy on 3 July 1956 and was commissioned on an unknown date.

Later in her service, she was designated as LSM-658.

She participated in the Team Spirit 1991 and carried South Korean M48 Patton tanks.

She was decommissioned on 28 February 1999 and her fate is unknown.

== Awards ==
LST-19 have earned the following awards:

- American Campaign Medal
- Asiatic-Pacific Campaign Medal (5 battle stars)
- Combat Action Ribbon
- Philippines Liberation Medal (2 awards)
- Philippines Presidential Unit Citation
- World War II Victory Medal

== Sources ==
- United States. Dept. of the Treasury (1962). Treasury Decisions Under the Customs, Internal Revenue, Industrial Alcohol, Narcotic and Other Laws, Volume 97. U.S. Government Printing Office.
- Moore, Capt. John (1984). Jane's Fighting Ships 1984-85. Jane's Information Group. ISBN 978-0710607959.
- Saunders, Stephen (2009). Jane's Fighting Ships 2009-2010. Jane's Information Group. ISBN 978-0710628886.
- Fairplay International Shipping Journal Volume 222. United Kingdom: Fairplay Publishing Limited. 1967.
