= USS LST-460 =

1942 LST-1-class tank landing ship

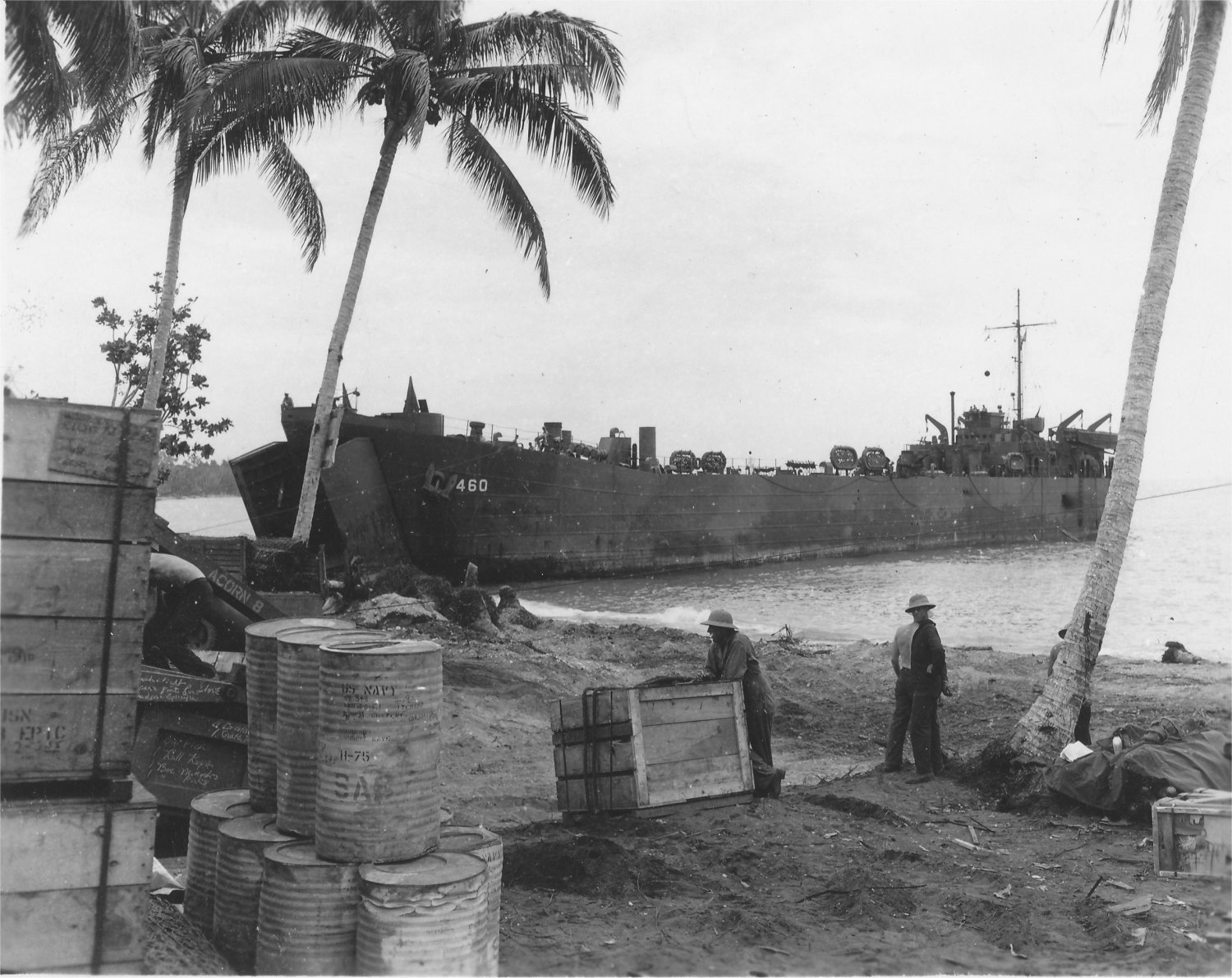
- USS LST-460, Guadalcanal 23 July 1943.

History

United States
- Name: LST-460
- Ordered: as a Type S3-M-K2 hull, MCE hull 980
- Builder: Kaiser Shipbuilding Company, Vancouver, Washington
- Yard number: 164
- Laid down: 26 September 1942
- Launched: 31 October 1942
- Commissioned: 15 February 1943
- Stricken: 19 January 1945
- Identification: Hull symbol: LST-460; Code letters: NFNG
- Honors and awards: 6 × battle stars
- Fate: Sunk, 21 December 1944

General characteristics
- Class & type: LST-1-class tank landing ship
- Displacement: 4,080 long tons (4,145 t) full load; 2,160 long tons (2,190 t) landing
- Length: 328 ft (100 m) oa
- Beam: 50 ft (15 m)
- Draft: Full load: 8 ft 2 in (2.49 m) forward; 14 ft 1 in (4.29 m) aft; Landing at 2,160 t: 3 ft 11 in (1.19 m) forward; 9 ft 10 in (3.00 m) aft
- Installed power: 2 × 900 hp (670 kW) Electro-Motive Diesel 12-567A diesel engines; 1,700 shp (1,300 kW)
- Propulsion: 1 × Falk main reduction gears; 2 × Propellers
- Speed: 12 kn (22 km/h; 14 mph)
- Range: 24,000 nmi (44,000 km; 28,000 mi) at 9 kn (17 km/h; 10 mph) while displacing 3,960 long tons (4,024 t)
- Boats & landing craft carried: 2 or 6 x LCVPs
- Capacity: 2,100 tons oceangoing maximum; 350 tons main deckload
- Troops: 16 officers, 147 enlisted men
- Complement: 13 officers, 104 enlisted men
- Armament: Varied, ultimate armament; 2 × twin 40 mm (1.57 in) Bofors guns; 4 × single 40 mm Bofors guns; 12 × 20 mm (0.79 in) Oerlikon cannons

Service record
- Operations: New Georgia Campaign; Vella Lavella occupation (17–18 August 1943); Treasury Island landings (1 November 1943); Hollandia operation (21–28 April 1944); Western New Guinea operation; Morotai landing (15 September 1944); Leyte landings (5–18 November 1944); Lingayen Gulf landings (12–18 December 1944)
- Awards: Combat Action Ribbon; American Campaign Medal; Navy Unit Commendation; Asiatic–Pacific Campaign Medal; World War II Victory Medal; Philippine Republic Presidential Unit Citation; Philippine Liberation Medal

USS LST-460 was a United States Navy LST-1-class tank landing ship used in the Asiatic-Pacific Theater during World War II. As with many of her class, the ship was never named. Instead, she was referred to by her hull designation.

== Construction ==
The ship was laid down on 26 September 1942, under Maritime Commission (MARCOM) contract, MC hull 980, by Kaiser Shipyards, Vancouver, Washington; launched 31 October 1942; and commissioned on 15 February 1943.

== Service history ==
During World War II, LST-460 was assigned to the Asiatic-Pacific theater. She took part in the consolidation of the southern Solomons in June 1943; the New Georgia Campaign which included the Vella Lavella occupation in August 1943; the Treasury Island landings, November 1943; the Hollandia operation in April 1944; the Western New Guinea operation, the Morotai landing in September 1944; the Leyte operation in November 1944; the Lingayen Gulf landings during the Lingayen Gulf landings of December 1945.

LST-460 was lost in action due to an enemy aircraft attack on 21 December 1944, off Mindoro, Philippines. She was struck from the Navy list on 19 January 1945.

== Honors and awards ==
LST-460 earned six battle stars for her World War II service.

== Notes ==
Citations

== Bibliography ==
Online resources

- "LST-460". Dictionary of American Naval Fighting Ships. Naval History and Heritage Command. 3 August 2015. This article incorporates text from this source, which is in the public domain.
- "Kaiser Vancouver, Vancouver WA". www.ShipbuildingHistory.com. 27 November 2010.
- "USS LST-460". NavSource. 26 September 2015.
