= USS War Hawk =

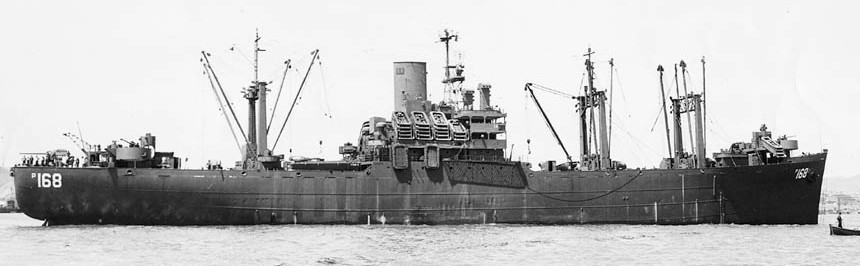

History

United States
- Name: USS War Hawk
- Builder: Moore Dry Dock Company, Oakland, California
- Laid down: 24 December 1942
- Launched: 3 April 1943
- Commissioned: 9 March 1944
- Decommissioned: 12 August 1946
- Stricken: 8 October 1946
- Honors and awards: 3 battle stars (World War II)
- Fate: Returned to the Maritime Commission, 13 August 1946; Sold for commercial service, 4 February 1948

General characteristics
- Class & type: La Salle-class transport
- Displacement: 13,910 long tons (14,133 t) full
- Length: 459 ft 2 in (139.95 m)
- Beam: 63 ft (19 m)
- Draft: 23 ft 2 in (7.06 m)
- Speed: 16.5 knots (30.6 km/h; 19.0 mph)
- Boats & landing craft carried: 6 Landing Craft, Vehicle, Personnel; 4 Landing Craft Mechanized
- Troops: 1,575 men
- Complement: 276 officers and enlisted
- Armament: 1 × 5"/38 caliber gun; 4 × 3"/50 caliber guns; 12 × 20 mm guns

USS War Hawk (AP-168) was a La Salle-class transport and troopship of the United States Navy, built at the Moore Dry Dock Company in Oakland, California in 1942. The La Salle-class transport had a displacement of almost 14,000 tons and were designed to ferry troops and supplies to and from the war zone during World War II.

War Hawk carried eight LCVP (Higgins Boat) type landing craft used to move troops and four LCMs used to move heavy equipment to and from the shore.

== Service history ==
Her keel was laid down on 24 December 1942. The hull was completed in a little over three months and was launched on 3 April 1943 under the command of Commander S. H. Thompson. After launch, War Hawk was fitted out and acquired by the United States Navy on 9 March 1944. She was commissioned on the same day and designated AP-168.

=== The Marianas missions ===
On 21 April 1944 she left the San Francisco Bay headed for Pearl Harbor, on the island of Oahu. At Pearl Harbor War Hawk joined the 5th Fleet Amphibious Force and after training, left for her part in "Operation Forager", the liberation of the Marianas Islands. At the time of the landing there were about 59,000 Japanese troops stations in the Southern Marianas Islands, in particular on Saipan, Tinian and Guam.

The assault on Marianas was conducted with overwhelming force. All total there were 198 vessels involved including 110 transports and auxiliary ships and 88 warships. These ships carried and supported a force of 110,000 men. However, Saipan had been in Japanese control for more than ten years and was heavily fortified. There were approximately 31,000 Japanese troops (including navy), and well entrenched on the island.

War Hawk arrived at Saipan on 15 June 1944 and landed elements of the 2nd Marine Division on the southwestern shore of the island. Sometime during the next eight days War Hawk helped fight off two Japanese air attacks. During this time she also took on eleven seriously wounded Japanese prisoners of war. As was the nature of many Japanese soldiers, the only way they would be taken prisoner was if they could not fight. The extent of their wounds was so great that all eleven died in spite of efforts of War Hawk's medical staff. They were buried at sea. Four days after the landing, the Allies engaged the Japanese Navy in the Philippine Sea and inflicted tremendous damage. This battle prevented the Imperial Japanese Navy from resupplying their troops in the Marianas leaving a brutal war of attrition for the Japanese until the commanding officer, General Yoshitsugu Saitō, committed suicide and the island was declared liberated on 9 July 1944.

As the fighting on Saipan came to a close, some of War Hawk's sister ships began moving troops from Saipan to Tinian. War Hawk did not directly participate in the invasion of Tinian. However, several LCVPs en route to Saipan's beachheads, came within range of what were apparently 20 mm explosive shell fire from Tinian which is only a few miles off the coast of Saipan. There were no hits, but much spray as the shells landed near the boats.

On 23 June 1944 War Hawk headed back to Pearl Harbor where she picked up elements of the United States Army's 77th Infantry and returned to the Marianas. She landed her troops on Guam on 21 July. She loitered in the area for several more days before returning to Pearl Harbor on 29 June. There she spent a month practicing with new troops from the Army's 96th Infantry Division before leaving again for the South Pacific Theater.

En route, she was diverted from the canceled invasion of Yap to take part in the invasion of the Philippines.

=== Leyte ===
During the latter part of 1944 and early 1945, War Hawk participated in the operations to liberate the Philippines. She left Pearl Harbor carrying elements of the Army's 96th Infantry Division and headed for Yap Island, in the Carolines. En route, she changed heading for Eniwetok as the invasion of Yap was canceled. After leaving Eniwetok, she sailed for Manus. She headed to the Philippines on 14 October 1944 to take part in the invasion of Leyte.

Leyte was heavily defended by 20,000 Japanese troops. The Imperial Japanese Army had decided that it was best to fortify the Philippines to prevent the Allies from moving north through them to the Japanese homeland. In total there were about 432,000 troops on the various Philippine Islands. There were also between 100 and 120 operational Japanese air bases that would be used to provide air attacks during any amphibious invasion.

The approach to the landing was from the southwest through Leyte Gulf. The beaches were between the cities of Tacloban and Dulag on the northeast side of the island. In total, the Leyte invasion was the largest invasion mounted in the Pacific to date. There were a combined total of 701 ships of which 157 were warships. The transports put six Army divisions and one battalion of Rangers onto Leyte in just a few days.

It was during this phase of the war that General Douglas MacArthur waded ashore at Red Beach and issued his famous "I have returned" speech to the people of the Philippines. Carl Mydans, a photographer for Time–Life, took the famous photograph of MacArthur wading ashore on Red Beach on 9 January 1945. War Hawk landed her troops not far away at Green Beach.

In the evening of 21 October 1944, War Hawk was maneuvering through Leyte Gulf and rammed the battleship USS Tennessee near the stern. Tennessee was laying dead in the water and generating smoke to protect the ships from air attack. No one was hurt on either ship. The damage to Tennessee was light but War Hawk sustained moderate damage near the bow.

One of the more interesting pieces of cargo that War Hawk landed at Leyte was a Piper Cub artillery spotting aircraft. It left Pearl Harbor loaded onto the deck of War Hawk (with its wings removed) and was put ashore by an LCM. Before the aircraft could be assembled, a Japanese mortar round knocked a palm tree over onto it.

After the initial invasion of Leyte, War Hawk sailed back to Dutch New Guinea, where she picked up a field hospital unit and returned to Leyte. War Hawk returned to New Britain and picked up troops from the Army's 40th Infantry Division and returned to Luzon.

=== Luzon ===
The next step in the liberation of the Philippines was the invasion of the island of Luzon, on which the Philippine capitol Manila resides. The land invasion of Luzon began at the base of Lingayen Gulf on the Northwestern side of the island on 9 January 1945. In just a few days, War Hawk and her sister ships had landed almost 175,000 troops, mostly made up of the 6th Army. These troops began a push east, north and south towards Manila.

Initially, beach resistance was light and with a low surf, War Hawk was able to put her troops and supplies almost directly onto the beach. There was some fire from Japanese gun emplacements. These emplacements were often made of layers of coconut logs which, being very spongy, were very resistant to everything but the large caliber weapons.

=== Lingayen Gulf ===
At 04:10 on the morning of 10 January 1945, War Hawk was anchored in Lingayen Gulf where she was attacked in the dark by a Shinyo suicide boat. These boats were small motorboats laden with up to two tons of explosives in the bow. Lookouts reported hearing an approaching boat when the Shinyo rammed the port side of the ship. The explosion blew a 25-foot (7.6 m) hole in hold number three, killing 61 men. (Commander Thompson's official Action Report filed on 18 January 1945 states that 23 people were missing and unaccounted for 20 minutes after the explosion. He does not give details on the wounded.) The damage to the ship was extensive, including flooding in the engine room which knocked out power. With the ship dead in the water, the crew struggled to keep her afloat, restore power and fight off continuing Japanese air attacks throughout the day. That same day, two Landing Craft Infantry (LCI-365 and LCI-974) were sunk in the same area by Shinyo boats.

By 11 January, the hole had been buttressed and partial power had been restored, and War Hawk began a long, slow journey back to Leyte Gulf. Two days later, on 13 January, the gun crews downed a kamikaze aircraft, splattering the bow with flaming debris. Once in Leyte Gulf, further and more permanent repairs were made to the ship, enabling her to sail to Manus in the Admiralty Islands for further dry dock work. She set sail for San Francisco Bay on 22 February 1945.

=== The end of World War II ===
War Hawk was repaired at an unknown dock facility in San Francisco Bay and set sail for San Diego on 29 May 1945. There she picked up troops from an unspecified division and returned to Guam in the Marianas. She made one more trip back to San Francisco for a load of naval replacements and headed for Eniwetok, Ulithi and Leyte Gulf. While en route, she received word that the United States had dropped two atomic weapons on Hiroshima and Nagasaki and the Japanese had agreed to an unconditional surrender.

=== Civilian service ===
War Hawk was decommissioned on 12 August 1946 in Seattle, Washington. She became the property of the Maritime Commission on 13 August after sailing to Olympia, Washington, and was eventually struck from the Navy List on 8 October 1946.

The Waterman Steamship Corporation of Mobile, Alabama, purchased her on 4 February 1948 and operated her until 1964 as a freighter. After her service with Waterman, War Hawk was sold to the Ocean Transport Company of New York and renamed Ocean Dinny. She operated with under Ocean Clippers, Inc., until 1966 when she was sold again to her last owner of record, the Overseas Carrier Corporation. She was scrapped at Kaohsiung in January 1971.
