= Shinyo (suicide motorboat) =

Motorboats used for suicide attacks by the Imperial Japanese Navy

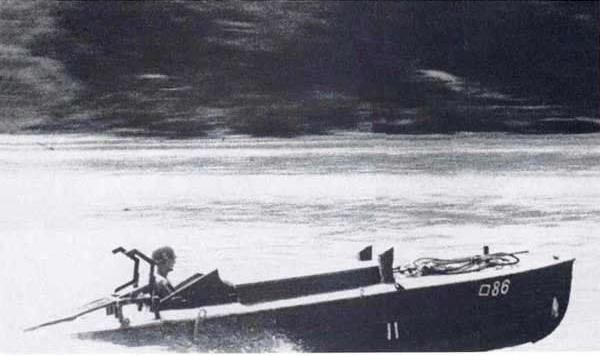
- A Shinyo suicide motorboat being tested by Lt Col James F. Doyle USA commanding officer 2nd Battalion, 305th Infantry 69th Division

Class overview
- Name: Shin'yō-class suicide motorboat
- Builders: Yokosuka Naval Arsenal
- Operators: (Empire of Japan) Imperial Japanese Navy
- Subclasses: Shinyo Type 1, Shinyo Type 5
- Built: April 1944–June 1945
- In commission: August 1944–August 1945
- Planned: 11,300
- Completed: 6,197
- Lost: At least 36

General characteristics
- Class & type: Motorboat
- Displacement: Type 1: 1.35 t (1.33 long tons); Type 5: 2.2 t (2.2 long tons)
- Propulsion: Toyota Type B engine
- Speed: Type 1: 26 knots (48 km/h; 30 mph); Type 5: 30 knots (56 km/h; 35 mph)
- Crew: Type 1: 1, Type 5: 2
- Armament: Bow-mounted Type 98 high explosive charge of 270 kg (600 lb); Two 120 mm (4.7 in) anti-ship rockets mounted on launchers

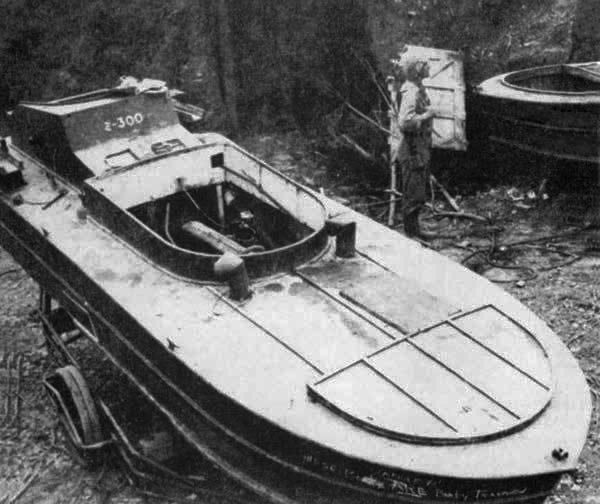
A Japanese Shinyo suicide motorboat, 1945

The Shinyo (震洋, Shin'yō; "Sea Quake") were Japanese suicide motorboats developed during World War II. They were part of the wider Japanese Special Attack Units program.

== History ==
Towards the end of 1943, in response to unfavorable progress in the war, the Japanese high command heard suggestions for various suicide craft. These suggestions were initially rejected as "defeatist" but later deemed necessary. For the naval department this meant kamikaze planes, kaiten submarines, fukuryu suicide divers or human naval mines, and shinyo suicide boats.

The program began in March 1944. The first vessels were tested on 27 May, after which it was decided that the original steel hull design would be replaced by a wooden hull due to the Japanese steel shortage. On 1 August, 150 students, on average 17 years old, elected to begin training for the Shinyo.

The main operative use took place during the Philippines campaign of 1944–45.

By September 1945, substantial numbers of these craft had been deployed to various locations throughout the Japanese Empire. Around 400 boats were transported to Okinawa and Formosa, and the rest were stored on the coast of Japan for the ultimate defense against the expected invasion of the Home islands. In Hong Kong, several shinyo boats laden with explosives were discovered at Sok Kwu Wan (Picnic Bay) on Lamma Island, positioned and ready for deployment against Allied forces.

== Characteristics ==
The shinyo were single-operator fast motorboats capable of reaching speeds of approximately 55 km/h (30 kn). They were equipped with a bow-mounted explosive charge of up to 300 kg (660 lb) that could be detonated either on impact or manually by the pilot. The boats also carried two anti-ship rockets mounted on launchers positioned on either side behind the driver. Production totaled 6,197 shinyo boats for the Imperial Japanese Navy and 3,000 Maru-ni craft for the Imperial Japanese Army.

The similar Maru-Ni, operated by the Imperial Japanese Army, were equipped with two depth charges and were not actually suicide boats, as the concept involved dropping the depth charges and escaping before detonation. Although survival chances against the blast wave appeared slim, a small number of crewmen successfully escaped. The depth charges were designated as the Experimental Manufacture Use 120 kg Depth Charge and were armed by a delayed-action pull igniter.

== Operational results ==
- January 10, 1945: Sinking of American ships USS LCI(G)-365 (Landing Craft Infantry – Gunboat), USS LCI(M)-974 (Landing Craft Infantry – Mortar) and crippling of USS War Hawk (an auxiliary transport) in Lingayen Gulf, Luzon, Philippines.
- January 31, 1945: Sinking of USS PC-1129 (Submarine chaser) off Nasugbu in Luzon, Philippines.
- February 16, 1945: Sinking of USS LCS(L)-7 (Landing Craft Support – Large), LCS(L)-26, and LCS(L)-49 off Mariveles, Corregidor Channel, Luzon.
- April 4, 1945: Sinking of USS LCI(G)-82 (Landing Craft Infantry – Gunboat) and USS LSM-12 (Landing Ship Medium) off Okinawa.
- April 9, 1945: Damaging of USS Charles J. Badger (DD-657).
- April 27, 1945: Crippling of USS Hutchins (DD-476) in Buckner Bay, Okinawa.
- May 4, 1945: Damaging of USS Carina (AK-74) in the north end of Buckner Bay, Okinawa.

== See also ==
- List of Allied vessels struck by Japanese special attack weapons
- MT explosive motorboat

== Bibliography ==
- Wilterding, John H. Jr. (2006). "Re: Mystery Photo 158". Warship International. XLIII (1): 41–43. ISSN 0043-0374.
