= USS LST-724 =

LST-542-class tank landing ships

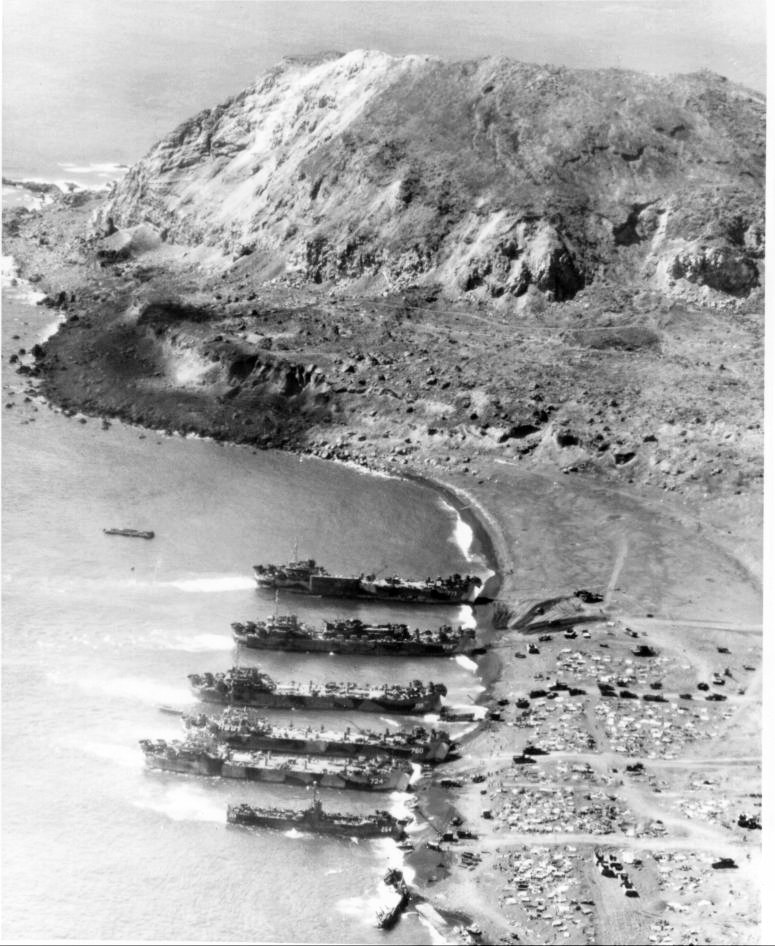

History

United States
- Laid down: 20 July 1944
- Launched: 29 August 1944
- Commissioned: 22 September 1944
- Decommissioned: 26 June 1946
- Stricken: 31 July 1946
- Fate: Sold, 23 September 1947

General characteristics
- Displacement: 4,080 tons (full load)
- Length: 328 ft (100 m)
- Beam: 50 ft (15 m)
- Draught: 2.3 ft (0.70 m) (lt.) to 8.25 ft (2.51 m) (f.)
- Propulsion: two General Motors 12-567, 900hp diesel engines, two shafts, twin rudders
- Speed: 12 knots
- Boats & landing craft carried: two LCVP
- Complement: 7 officers, 104 enlisted
- Armament: 20 mm and 40 mm gun mounts

USS LST-724 was an LST-542-class tank landing ship acquired by the U.S. Navy during World War II for the task of landing troops and supplies on enemy beachheads.

== World War II service ==
LST-724 was laid down on 20 July 1944 at Jeffersonville, Indiana, by the Jeffersonville Boat & Machine Co.; launched on 29 August 1944; sponsored by Mrs. Frances M. Lively; and commissioned on 22 September 1944.

Iwo Jima

LST-724 participated in the assault on Iwo Jima, landing at the beach closest to Mount Suribachi. LST-724 was below Mount Suribachi when the marines took it on 23 February 1945, and its crew witnessed the famous raising of the U.S. flag as captured by Marine photographer Joe Rosenthal.

=== Landing operations at Okinawa ===
During World War II, LST-724 was assigned to the Asiatic-Pacific theater and participated in the assault and occupation of Okinawa Gunto from April through June 1945. In preparation for the assault on Okinawa, LST-724 was damaged in a kamikaze attack on 31 March 1945 at 25°59'N, 127°50'E, but was still able to participate in the landing as scheduled.

=== End-of-war operations ===
Following the war, she performed occupation duty in the Far East and saw service in China until late March 1946.

== Post-war decommissioning ==
LST-724 returned to the United States and was decommissioned on 26 June 1946 and struck from the Navy list on 31 July that same year. On 23 September 1947, the ship was sold to William E. Skinner, New York, New York.

== Military awards and honors ==
LST-724 earned two battle stars for World War II service at Okinawa and Iwo Jima.
