= Naval Base Kossol Roads =

Former major US Navy Base

Palau on the globe, Kossol Roads is at the north end of islands in red United States Navy Naval Base 1944–1945 7.972780°N 134.671152°E

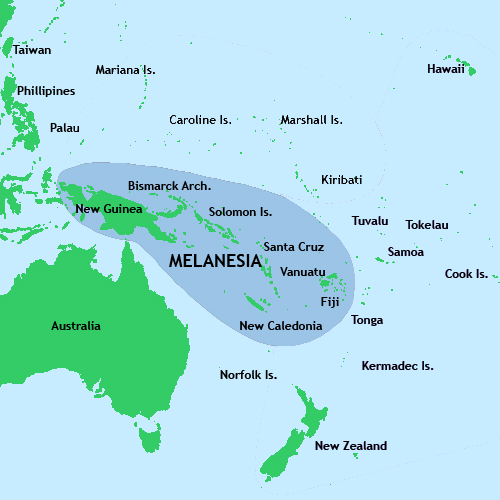
Palau northwest of the Melanesia Islands

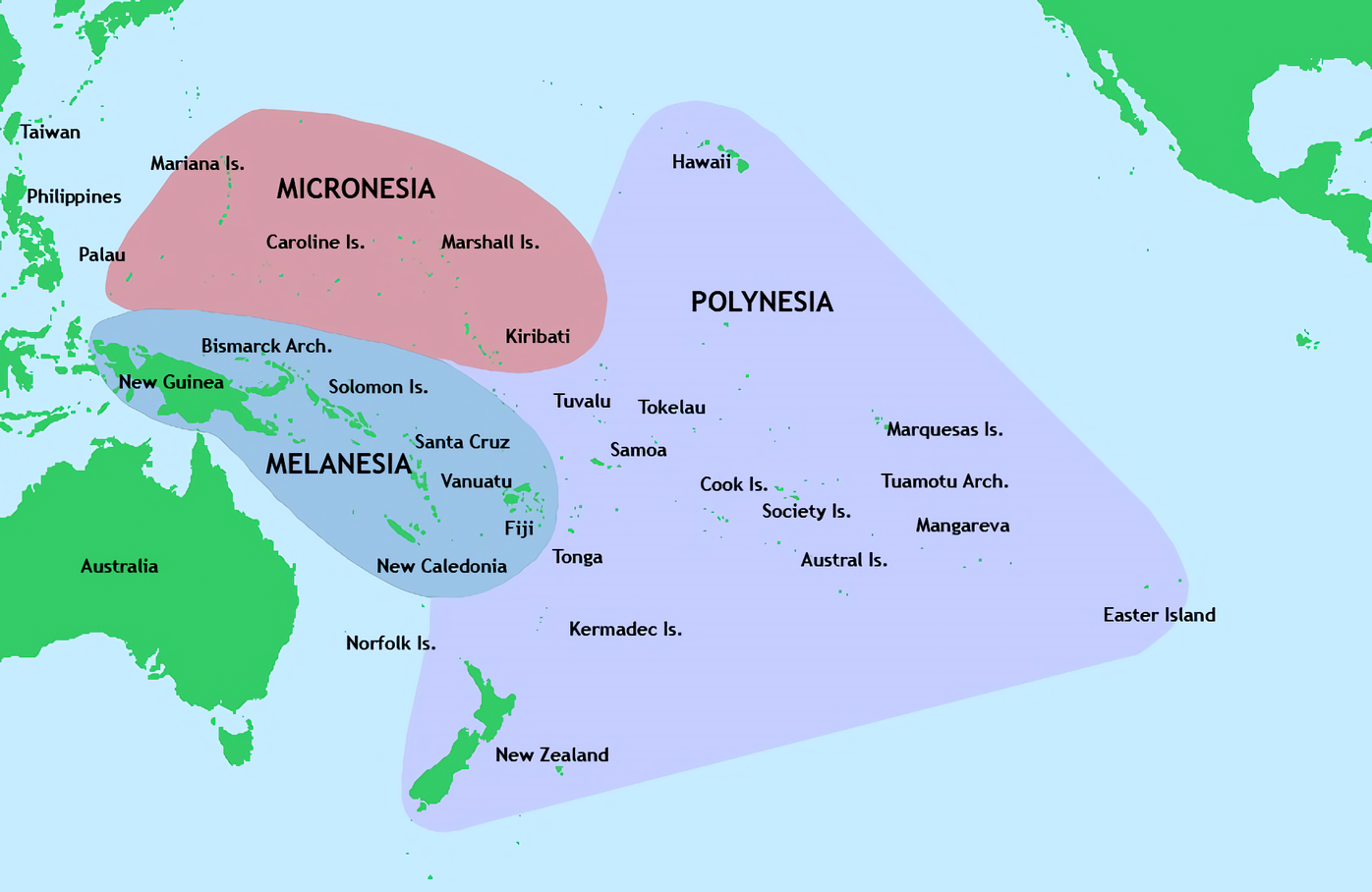
Micronesia is one of three major areas in the Pacific Ocean, along with Polynesia and Melanesia

Map of Palau, Kossol Roads is between Kayangel and Melekeok

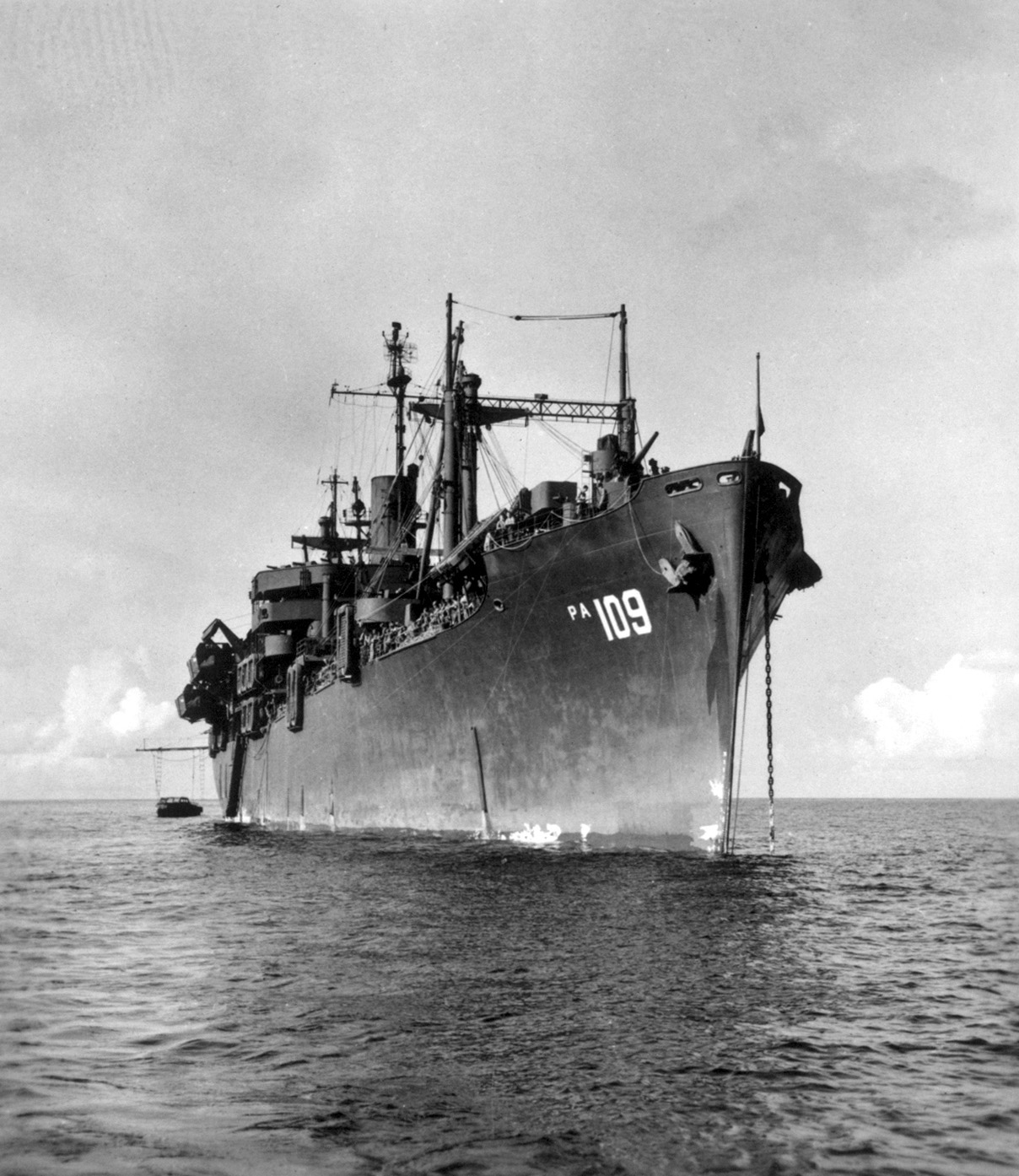
USS Grafton (APA-109) anchored in Kossol Passage, Palau, May 14, 1945

Naval Base Kossol Roads also called Naval Base Kossol Passage was a major United States Navy base at Kossol Roads in northern Palau in the western Caroline Islands in the western Pacific Ocean during World War II. Kossol Roads lagoon is surrounded by fringing coral reef. The base was built to support the island hopping Pacific War efforts of the allied nations fighting the Empire of Japan. In terms of the number of ships at one base, Naval Base Kossol Roads was one of the largest Naval Base in the world in 1944 and 1945. Naval Base Kossol Roads was unique, as it was the only large US Naval base to have no shore facilities. Kossol Roads was part of US Naval Base Carolines.

== History ==
Kossol Roads is a large tropical coral atoll with a lagoon circled by a coral reef in a 10 miles (16 km) circumference. The deep lagoon in the atoll offers excellent fleet anchorage for the largest ships. The lagoon has only one southern entrance, providing excellent control and protection. The southern entrance is at Kossol Roads North-South and the Ebil Passage. The largest island to Kossol Roads, and the largest island in Palau is Babeldaob island, 15 miles (24 km) to the south. To the north 10 miles (16 km) is the small island of Kayangel. The Empire of Japan built a large base and airfield on the south tip of Babeldaob, 41 miles to the south of Kossol Roads. Due to the strong defenses on Babeldaob, the island was bypassed in the island hopping campaign. But, the US Naval built bases to the south, Naval Base Peleliu and Kossol Roads to the north of Babeldaob, to attack and cut off the bases. After World War I Babeldaob became part of Japan under the South Seas Mandate. In 1944, Japan built an airfield on Babeldaob, now Roman Tmetuchl International Airport. In the United States' Battle of Peleliu (September to November 1944) the US took control of the southern tip of Palau away from the Imperial Japanese Army. Babeldaob is also spelled Babelthuap Island.

Kossol Roads was used by the Imperial Japanese Navy for anchorage. The anchorage was supported by three land bases on Babeldaob. On September 15, 1944, the US Navy captured Kossol Roads at the start of the Battle of Peleliu. By September 24 US minesweepers had cleared Kossol Roads of naval mines and Kossol Roads lagoon was safe to use. Immediately US Navy ships started to arrive and the base was set up. The USS Garland (AM-238), a minesweeper, was the gatekeeper and harbor control ship at the entrance to the lagoon. Kossol Roads Fleet Post Office # was 3027. Kossol Roads was supported by the even large base, Naval Base Ulithi, 368 miles (592 km) to the east.

At Kossol Roads, also called Kossol Anchorage or Kossol Passage, the US Navy set up a large floating base. The floating base was called a service squadron. A Service Squadron had all the vessels needed to operate a base, the same as a land base would have. Kossol Roads was used as an assembly area for convoys, fleets and Task force. The base was also a refueling stop for ships heading east or west. The Service Squadron was able to do repairs and resupply of the ships at Kossol Roads. Kossol Roads was a fleet staging area to support upcoming operations in the Philippines campaign including the Battle of Mindoro, Battle of Leyte Gulf and Invasion of Lingayen Gulf on Luzon.

With the construction of Leyte-Samar Naval Base in the Philippines in late 1944, much of the operation at Kossol Roads moved to more forward bases. Kossol Roads continued to be a refueling station till the end of the war on VJ-Day.

== Kossol Roads lagoon ==
The deep lagoon the Navy set up fleet anchorage and a major US Naval Advance Base. Service Squadron 3 was based at Kossol Roads lagoon. Service Squadron 3 provided logistic support for Commander Service Force in the Western Pacific. Service Squadron 3 operated as a Mobile Logistic Support, able to travel to ports where support was needed. Parts of Service Squadron 10 were also stationed at Kossol Roads as needed. A Service Squadron is a floating Naval Base, with all the support a land base would give. In the Service Squadron were all the supplies and repair depot support the fleet needed. The Service Squadron had: Fleet Oilers (AO), Gasoline Tanker (AOG), Repair Ships (AR), Ammunition ships (AE), Destroyer Tenders (AD), Tugboats, Barges, Seaplane tenders,hospital ship (AH), Net laying ships (AN), barracks ships (APL), Small Auxiliary Floating Dry Docks, stores ship and submarine tenders (AS). The repair ship USS Argonne (AS-10) became the flagship for the base. Work was rough on November 7, 1944, when strong winds hit the lagoon with gusts up to 75 knots. Rubber boats had to be used to supply the seaplanes, as they would not damage the plane it bumped. The planes had to be ready for missions the next day. Japanese submarine I-53 succeeded in launching four Kaitens, manned torpedoes, off Kossol Roads, all have problems and none reached ships in the lagoon.

=== Kossol Roads repair depot ===
The US Navy set up a ship and boat repair depot at Naval Base Kossol. The repair depot provided the fleet with support to keep ships and boats tactically available in the Pacific War with the repair and supply depot, rather than ships having to return to continental United States. The Navy had built special auxiliary floating drydocks that were able to repair battle damage to even the largest ships and do regular maintenance in the field saving ships trans-pacific travel time for repair. Supply store ships were also at the base with the parts needed to keep the fleet ready. USS Argonne (AS-10) was damaged at Kossol Roads in an accident, she was repaired at the depot. The destroyer USS Wadleigh (DD-499) had repair work after hitting a mine near the base.

- Some of the Kossol Roads repair depot ships and crafts:
- USS Oak Ridge (ARDM-1), Auxiliary floating drydock
- USS ARD-17, Auxiliary floating drydock
- USS Prometheus (AR-3), repair ship
- USS Endymion (ARL-9), repair ship
- USS Oceanus (ARB-2), repair ship

=== Kossol Roads seaplane base ===
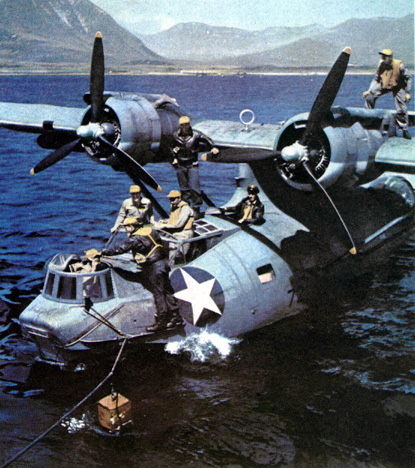
A Consolidated PBY Catalina seaplane crew

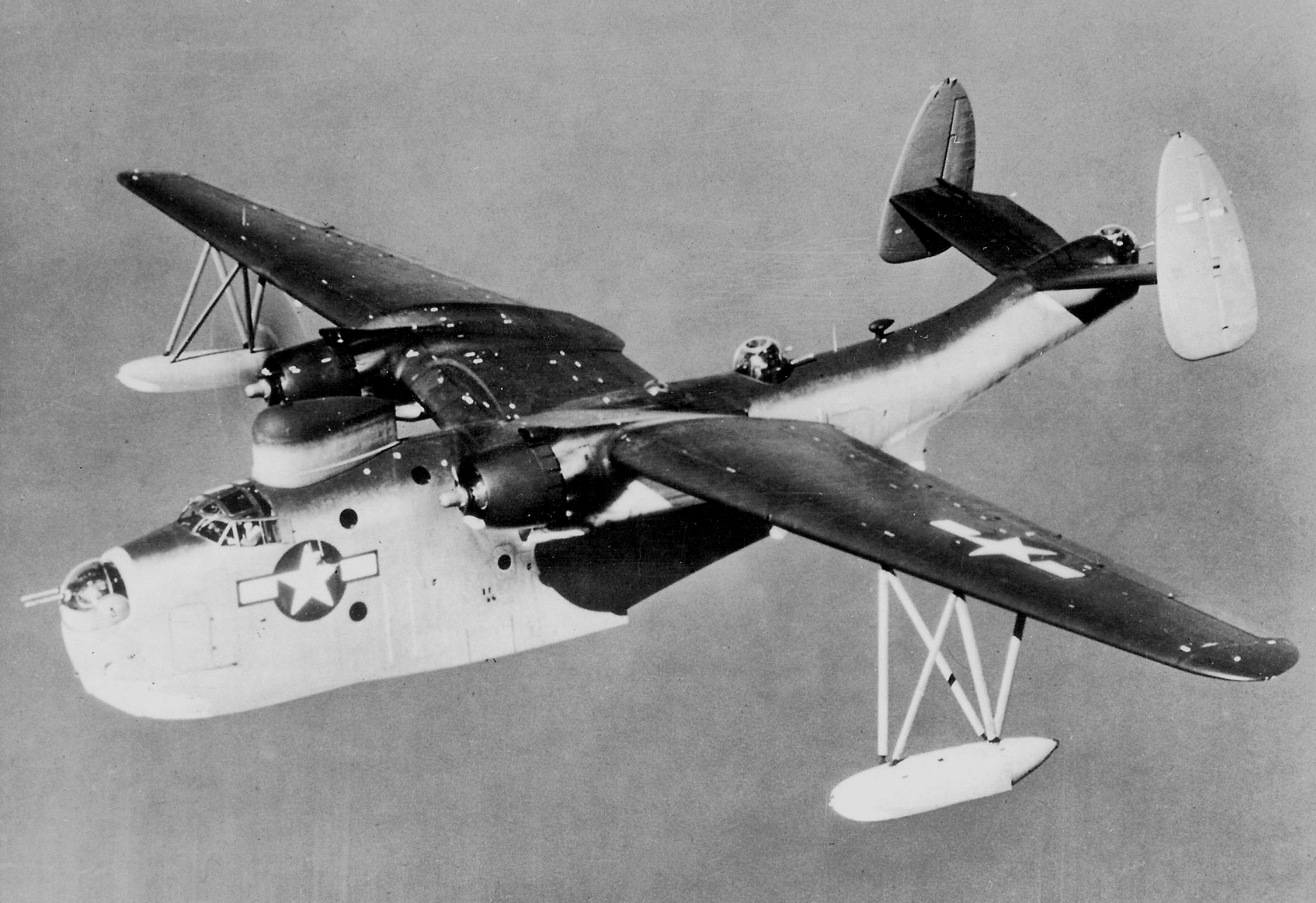
Martin PBM-5 Mariner seaplane in flight

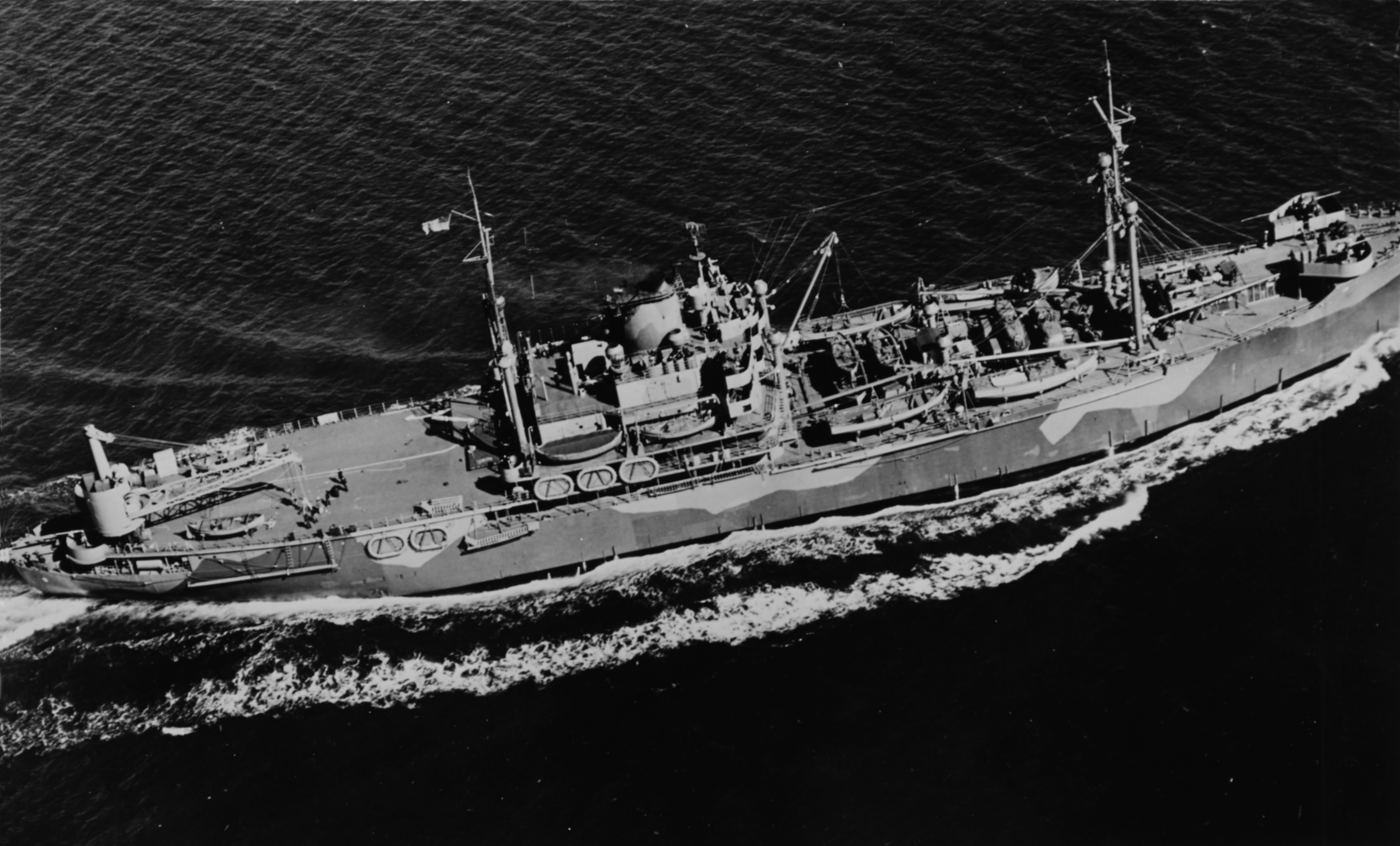
USS Pocomoke (AV-9) a seaplane tender, the crane at the rear of the ship is used to bring a seaplane on to the deck for repair and serving. The remaining parts of the ship are for the ship's and seaplane crew, also fuel for the ship and seaplanes. The ship's stores would have crew's food and spare parts for seaplanes.

In Kossol Roads lagoon all of the seaplane base operations were carried out by seaplane tenders in the lagoon. Seaplanes did reconnaissance patrols and search, also rescue missions for downed aircrew mem and survivors of sunk ships. The most common seaplanes at the base were Consolidated PBY Catalina and Martin PBM Mariner. The seaplane base take-off and landing was a spot was marked off in the atoll. Seaplane tenders had stores to supply: food, fuel, ammo, freshwater, and spare parts. The seaplane tender also had housing and mess halls for the aircrew while the seaplane was being serviced. Other seaplane tenders came to Naval Base Kossol to resupply the ship's stores before returning to a US Naval Advance Base. Some came to the Kossol repair depot to be repaired. Units base at Kossol seaplane base: VPB-202, VP-21, VPB-202, VP-17, VPB-216, VP-41, VH-1, VPB-16, and VPB-21. Many units moved to other bases, VPB-21 was the last seaplane to depart.

Some seaplane tenders at Naval Base Kossol: USS Tangier (AV-8), USS Chandeleur (AV-10), USS Kenneth Whiting (AV-14), USS Pocomoke (AV-9), USS Mackinac (AVP-13), USS Yakutat (AVP-32), USS Onslow (AVP-48), USS St. George (AV-16), USS Suisun (AVP-53) and USS Chincoteague (AVP-24).

=== Stationed at Kossol ===
Hundreds of ships anchored at Kossol, some stationed, some in for repair or resupply. United States Merchant Navy ships would unload supplies at Naval Base Kossol to keep the fleet and base supplied. The Service Squadron, a floating base with tankers, Fleet oilers, refrigerator ships, ammunition ships, supply ships, floating docks and repair ships.

- USS Ponaganset (AO-86), Freshwater tanker, 90,000 barrels of freshwater
- USS Mazama (AE-9), ammunition tender
- USS Sangay (AE-10), ammunition tender
- USS Lassen (AE-3), ammunition tender
- USS Boulder Victory (AK-227), ammunition tender
- USS Mauna Loa (AE-8), ammunition tender
- USS Amador, ammunition tender
- USS Las Vegas Victory (AK-229), ammunition tender
- USS Amador, ammunition tender
- USS Amador, ammunition tender
- USS Shasta (AE-6), ammunition tender
- SS Bluefield Victory, ammunition cargo
- SS Elmira Victory, ammunition cargo
- SS Iran Victory, ammunition cargo
- SS Durham Victory, ammunition cargo
- SS Bluefield Victory, ammunition cargo
- SS Elmira Victory, ammunition cargo
- SS Durham Victory, ammunition cargo
- USS Boulder Victory (AK-227), ammunition cargo, hit mine a Kossol, damaged
- USS Ransom (AM-283), minesweeper
- USS Turkey (AM-13), minesweeper
- USS Vigilance (AM-324), minesweeper
- USS Velocity (AM-128), minesweeper
- USS Zeal (AM-131), minesweeper
- USS Triumph (AM-323), minesweeper
- USS Control (AM-164), minesweeper
- USS Design (AM-219), minesweeper
- USS Ashtabula, oiler
- USS Sebec (AO-87), oiler
- USS Cahaba (AO-82), oiler
- USS Chepachet (AO-78), oiler
- USS Saranac (AO-74), oiler
- USS Big Horn (AO-45), oiler
- USS Big Horn (AO-45), oiler
- USS Caliente (AO-53), oiler
- USS Sebec (AO-87), oiler
- USS Ponaganset (AO-86), oiler
- USS Chehalis (AOG-48), oiler
- USS Kankakee (AO-39), oiler
- USS Tolovana (AO-64), oiler
- USS Kern (AOG-2), oiler
- USS Mascoma (AO-83), oiler
- USS Ocklawaha (AO-84), oiler
- USS Big Horn (AO-45), oiler
- USS Suamico (AO-49), oiler
- USS Cache (AO-67), oiler
- USS Niobrara (AO-72), oiler
- USS Octorara (IX-139), oiler
- USS Ashtabula (AO-51), oiler
- USS Mascoma (AO-83), oiler
- USS Niobrara (AO-72), oiler
- USS Cache (AO-67), oiler
- YO-186, concrete Barge Type B ship, oiler
- USS Kern (AOG-2), gasoline tanker
- USS Matar (AK-119), stores ship
- USS Achernar, stores ship
- USS Gadsden (AK-182), stores ship
- USS Megrez (AK-126), stores ship
- USS Supply (IX-147), stores ship
- USS Lesuth (AK-125), stores ship
- USS Naos (AK-105), stores ship
- USS Pavo (AK-139), stores ship
- USS Oriole (AMCU-33), mail ship
- USS Arapaho (ATF-68) Tugboat, Type V ship
- USS Munsee (ATF-107), Tug
- USS Allegheny (ATA-179), Tug
- USS Zuni (ATF-95), Tug
- Menominee (YTB-790), Tug
- USS Pawnee (ATF-74), Tug
- Small landing craft for moving supplies and personal
- Motor Launch boats for moving personal

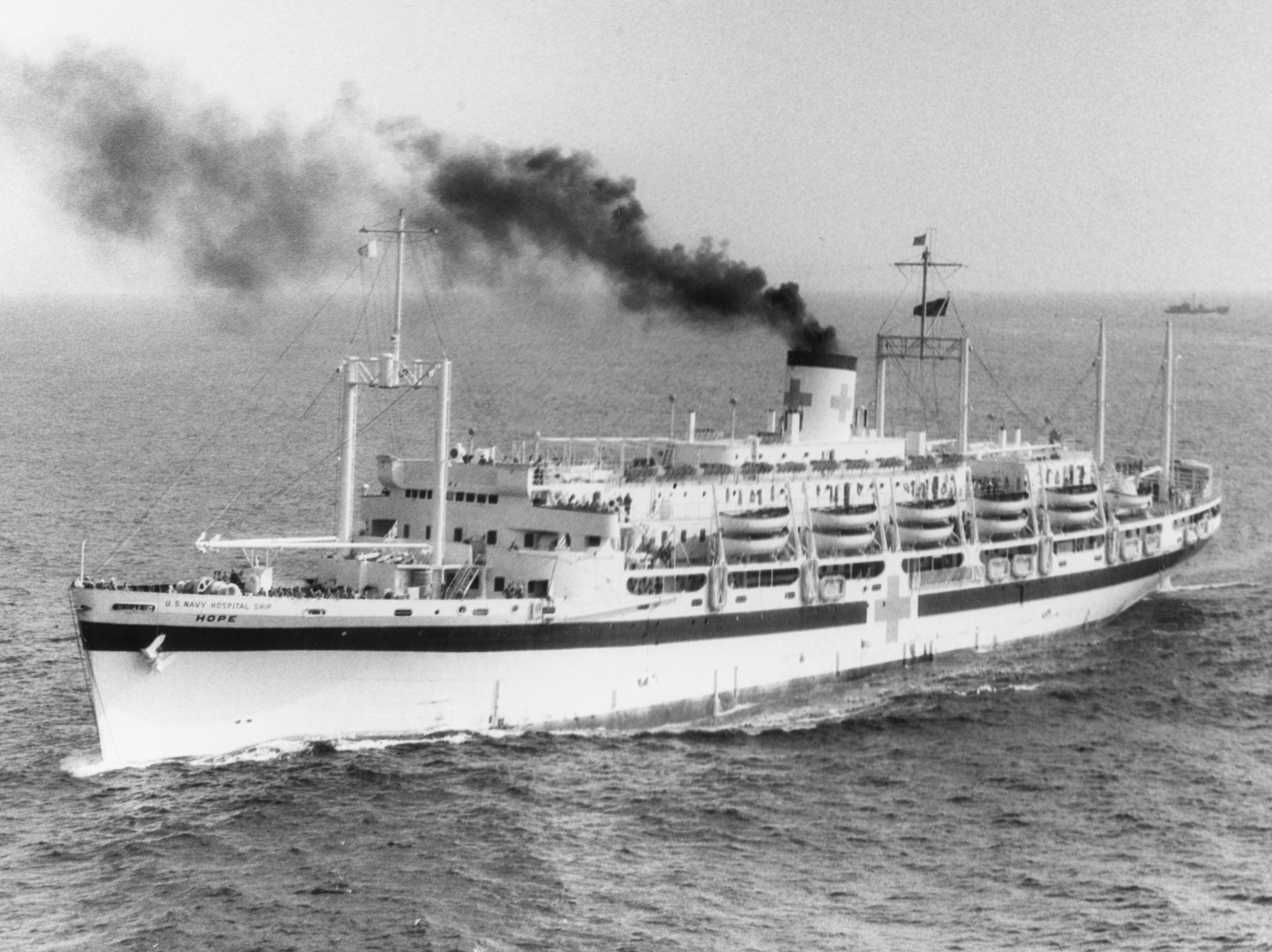
USS Hope (AH-7) hospital ship in 1944

=== Kossol floating hospital ===
Naval Base Kossol was used as a forward Naval hospital. US Navy hospital ships were stationed at Naval Base Kossol during parts of the war and some were stationed shortly as they joined staging for upcoming invasions. Hospital ships also were able to resupply and refuel at the base.

- USS Hope (AH-7), up to 400 patients
- USS Mercy (AH-8), up to 400 patients

=== Net Laying ===
To protect the many ships at Kossol the Navy had anti-torpedo net installed. The ships: USS Zebra (AKN-5) and USS Indus (AKN-1) supplied the nets. The ships also installed the moorings at Kossol.

- Net laying ships stationed at Kossol:
- USS Baretta
- USS Chestnut (AN-11)
- USS Keokuk (CMc-6)
- USS Catalpa (AN-10)

=== Submarine chaser and PT boat base ===
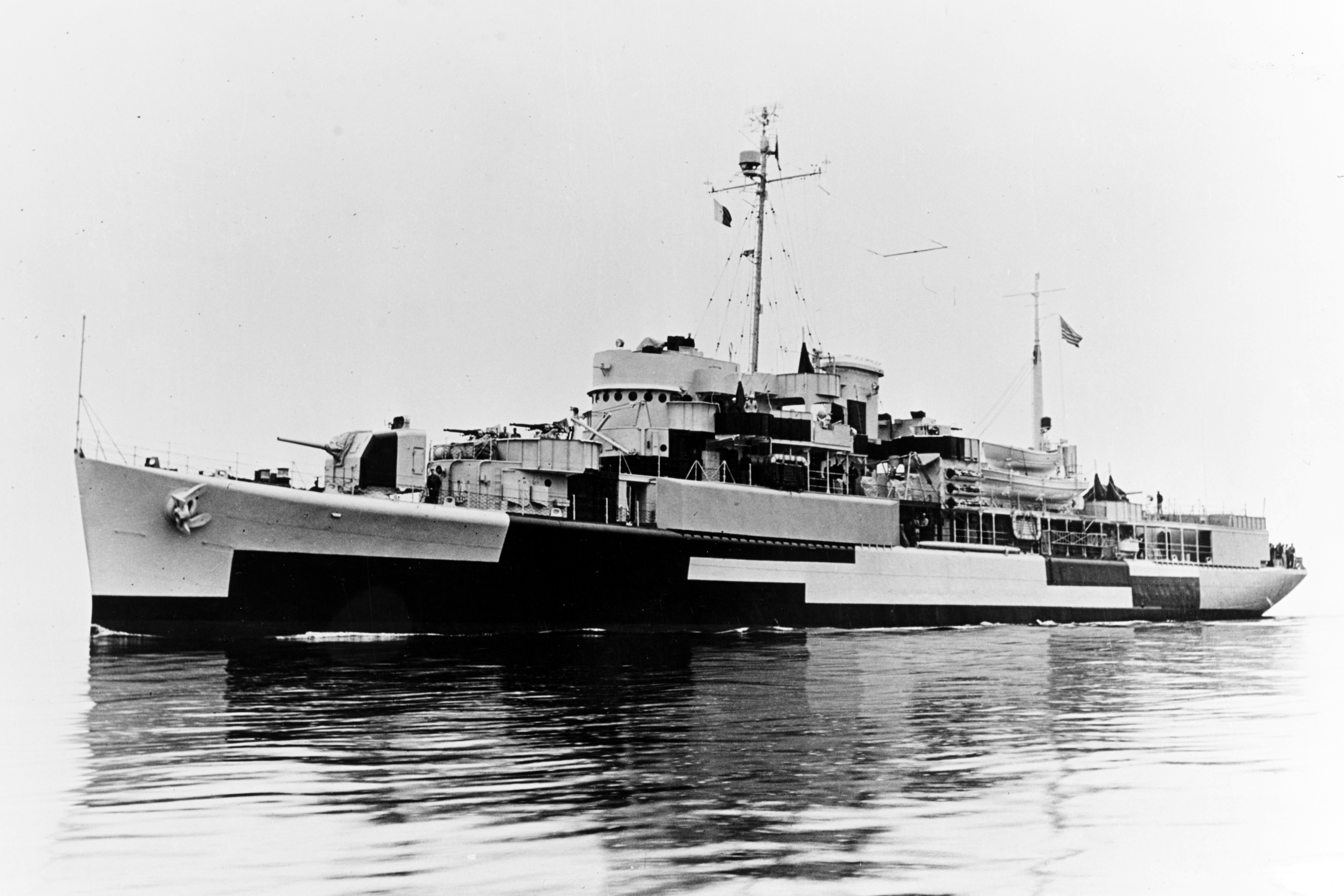
USS Willoughby (AGP-9) boat tender

To help protect the base and shipping around the base, Naval Base Kossol had a fleet of submarine chasers. Also stationed and passing through Kossol was PT boats. The submarine chasers and PR boats were supported by a submarine chaser tender ships: USS Varuna (AGP-5) and USS Willoughby (AGP-9). Also was stationed at Kossol to support the fleet of submarine chasers and some crash boats. crash boats were fast boats use to rescue downed airmen. Some of the submarine chasers served at Eniwetok : USS Grinnell (PC-1230) and USS PC-1177. Patrol Craft Force part of Task Force 77, with PT 40: 130, 131, 134, 137, 151, 152, 323, 489, 490, 492, 493, 495, use base for refueling and repairs. Torpedo Boat Group TG 70.1 was at Kossol before departing to Leyte.

== Fleet support ==
Kossol supported operations of the 7th fleet and 5th fleet. Naval Task forces used Kossol for staging upcoming missions. Task force 77 used Kossol for staging operations in the Philippines. Task Force 38 a Fast Carrier Task Force used Kossol for staging. Kossol had a target practice range for ships.

== Gallery ==
South Pacific islands in 1945

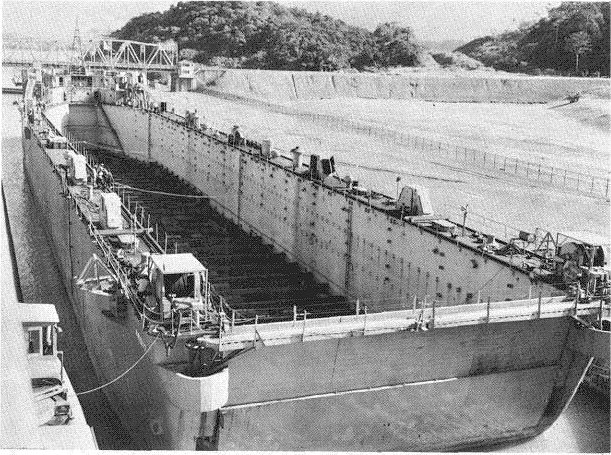
USS ARD-17 an Auxiliary floating drydock

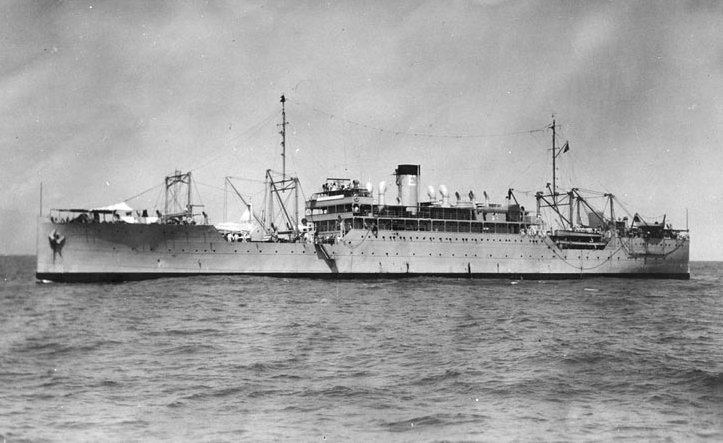
USS Argonne (AS-10) tender ship

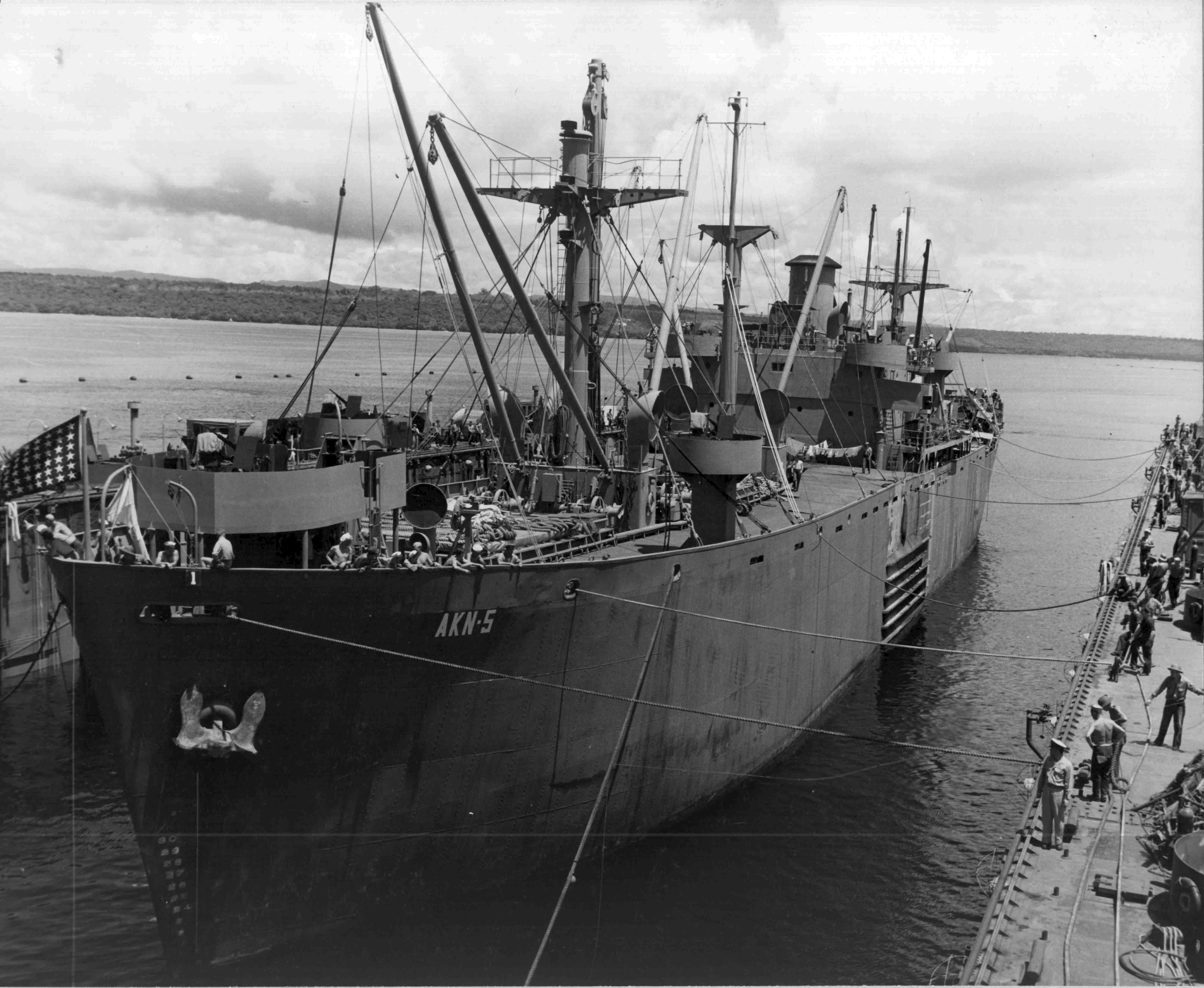
USS Zebra (AKN-5) net layer

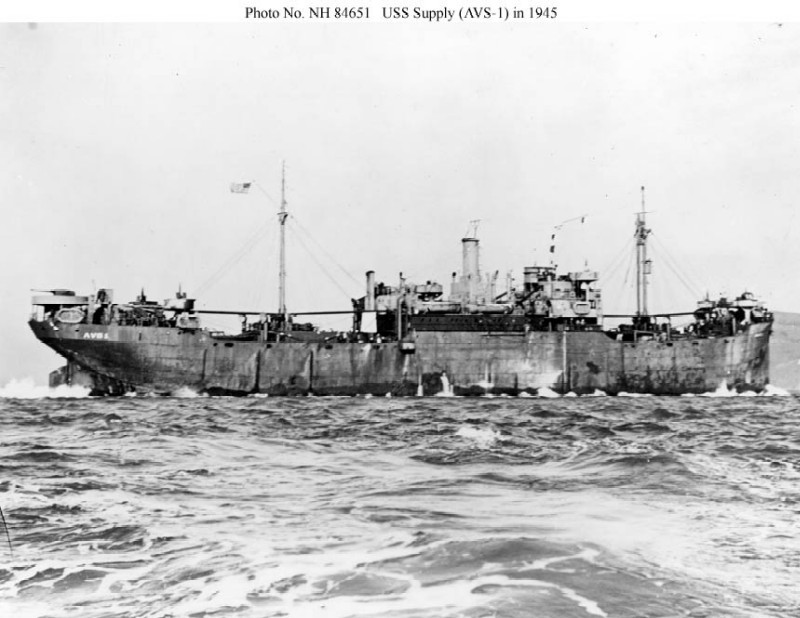
USS Supply (AVS-1) stores ship

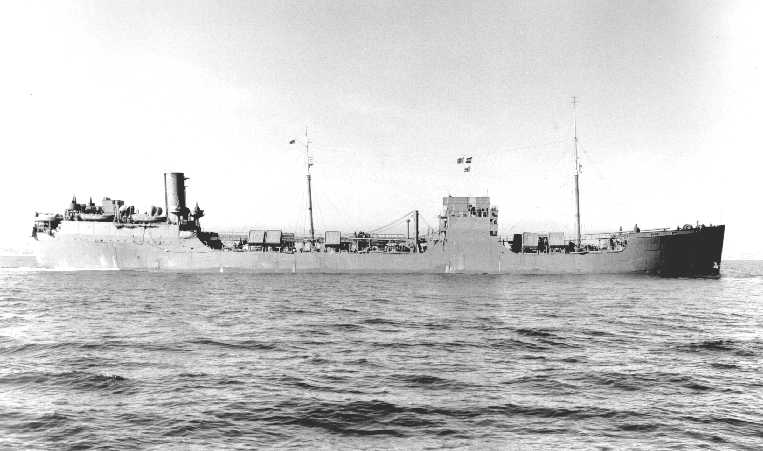
USS Big Horn (AO-45) fleet oiler

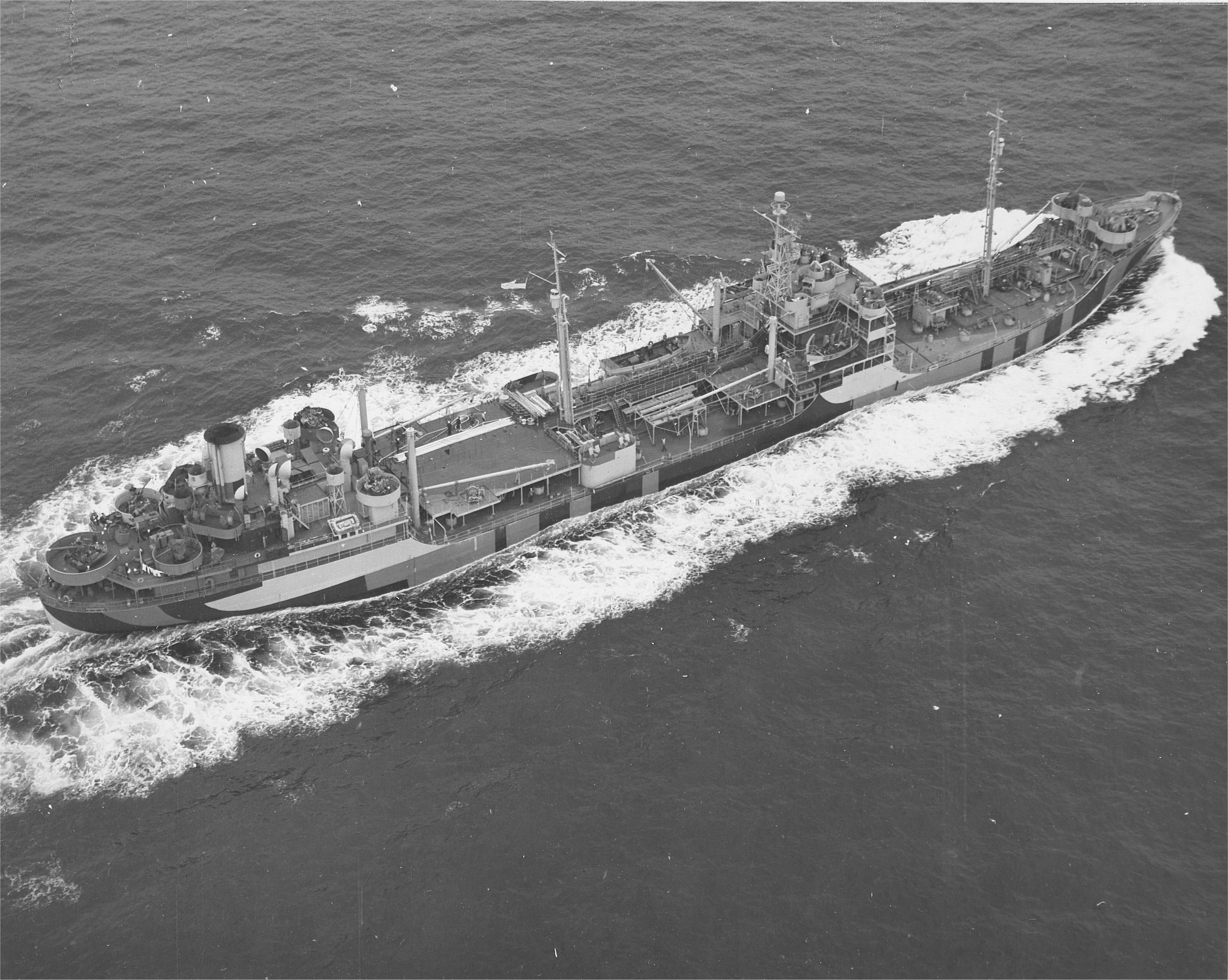
USS Sebec (AO-87) fleet oiler

== See also ==
- US Naval Advance Bases
- Naval Base Panama Canal Zone
