= USS Belmont (AGTR-4) =

United States Navy Cold War-era technical research ship

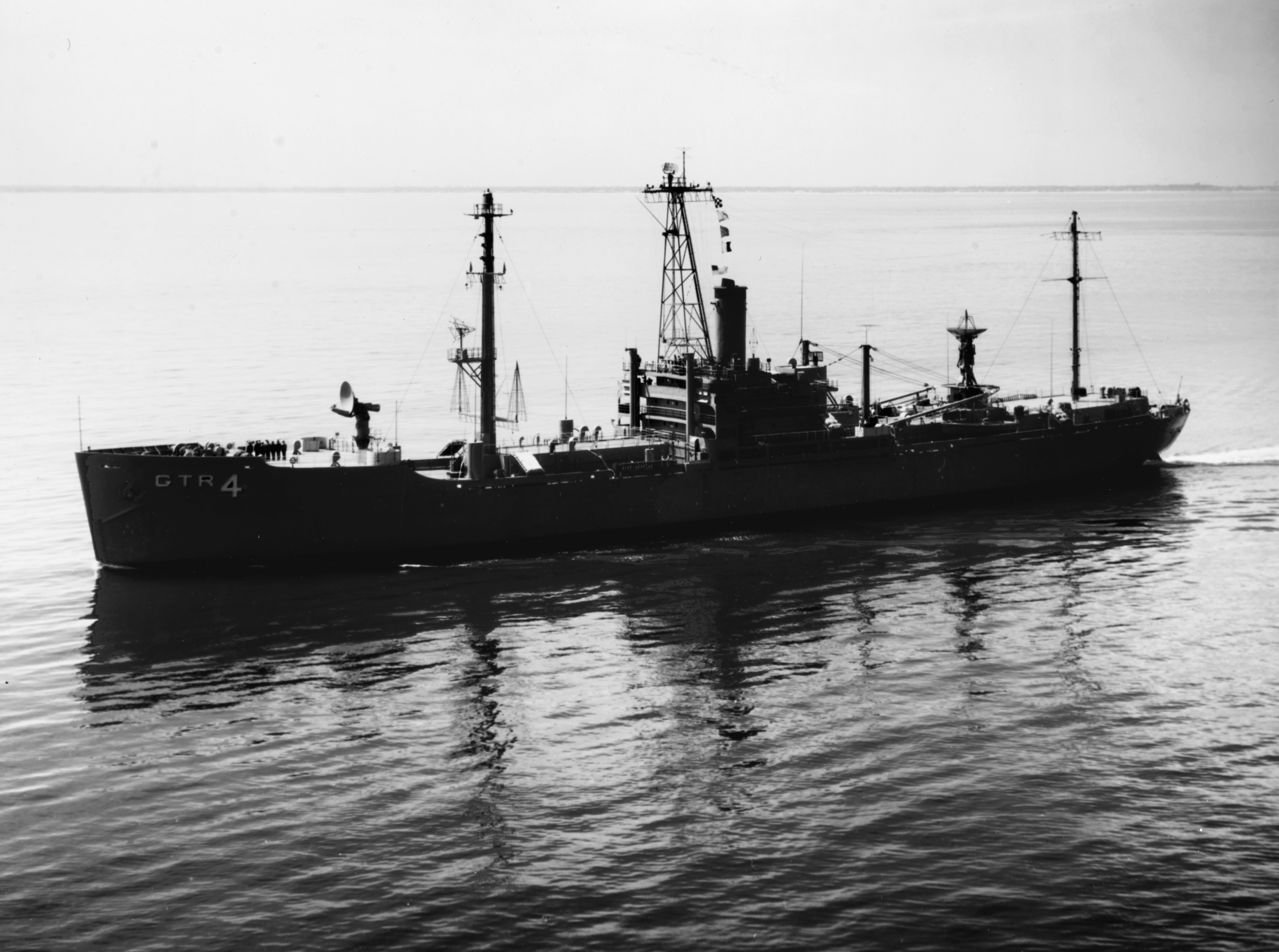
- USS Belmont underway in the late 1960s

History
- Name: SS Iran Victory
- Namesake: Iran
- Owner: War Shipping Administration
- Operator: Pacific-Atlantic Steamship Company
- Port of registry: (United States) Portland, Oregon
- Builder: Oregon Shipbuilding Company, Portland, Oregon
- Yard number: 1010
- Laid down: 25 January 1944
- Launched: 24 March 1944
- Completed: 4 May 1944
- Fate: Transferred to U.S. Navy February 1963, as USS Belmont

United States
- Name: USS Belmont
- Acquired: February 1963
- Commissioned: 2 November 1964
- Decommissioned: 16 January 1970
- Stricken: 16 January 1970
- Home port: Norfolk, Virginia
- Identification: AGTR-4
- Fate: Scrapped, 24 June 1970
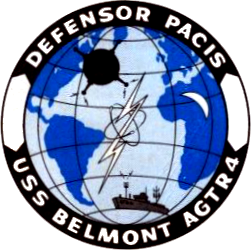
- Badge

General characteristics
- Class & type: VC2-S-AP3 Victory ship
- Tonnage: 7,612 GRT; 4,553 NRT
- Displacement: 15,200 tons
- Length: 455 ft (139 m)
- Beam: 62 ft (19 m)
- Draught: 28 ft (8.5 m)
- Installed power: 8,500 shp (6,300 kW)
- Propulsion: HP & LP turbines geared to a single 20.5-foot (6.2 m) propeller
- Speed: 16.5 knots (30.6 km/h; 19.0 mph)
- Boats & landing craft carried: 4 lifeboats
- Complement: 62 Merchant Marine and 28 US Naval Armed Guards as Victory ship; 318 as USS Belmont
- Armament: 1 × 5-inch (127 mm)/38 caliber gun as Victory ship; 1 × 3-inch (76 mm)/50 caliber gun as Victory ship; 8 × 20 mm Oerlikon as Victory ship

USS Belmont (AGTR-4/AG-167) was the first of two Belmont-class technical research ships, a class of US spy ships of the early Cold War, acquired by the U.S. Navy in 1963 and converted for the task of conducting "research in the reception of electromagnetic propagations" (electronic signals intelligence gathering). She was originally built during World War II as a Victory cargo ship named SS Iran Victory by the War Shipping Administration's Emergency Shipbuilding program under cognizance of the U.S. Maritime Commission.

== Design and construction ==
Iran Victory was laid down on 25 January 1944 at Portland, Oregon, by the Oregon Shipbuilding Corporation as Yard Number 1010 under a Maritime Commission contract (MCV hull 94) as a merchant cargo ship, one of the numerous VC2-S-AP3 Victory design. The Victory ships, a larger improvement on the basic Liberty ship design, carried 10,850 tons of cargo in three holds. Iran Victory measured 7,608 gross register tons and 4,551 net register tons, and had a length overall of 439.1 feet (133.8 m), a breadth of 62.1 ft (18.9 m), and a depth of 34.5 feet (10.5 m). She was powered by a pair of oil-fired steam turbines made by Westinghouse Electric & Manufacturing Company in Pittsburgh, Pennsylvania; geared to a single shaft and propeller, the total power of 8,500 hp (6,300 kW) gave her a speed of up to 17 knots (31 km/h).

The ship was launched as Iran Victory (Note: She was named for the country of Iran. Initially neutral, Iran became a major conduit for British and American aid to the Soviet Union throughout the war; later, the 1943 Tehran Conference between the Allied "Big Three" (Joseph Stalin, Franklin D. Roosevelt and Winston Churchill), gave post-war independence and set the boundaries of Iran.) on 25 March 1944, sponsored by Mrs. Peter Hegge, and delivered on 23 April 1944 to the Maritime Commission, which turned her over to a commercial shipowner, the Pacific-Atlantic Steamship Company, for operation manned by a civilian crew. She was registered at Portland, Oregon with Official Number 245473 and allocated code signal KWXB.

== Service as Iran Victory ==
On 20 October 1944 SS Iran Victory had job of delivering ammunition for troops of the US Central Philippine Attack Force. She was in a convoy of ships that was held at Kossol Roads in October 1944 until needed. The convoy included the ammunition ships Meridian Victory, Iran Victory and Bluefield Victory and the gasoline tanker Kishwaukee, protected by the destroyer escorts Lovelace, Neuendorf and Thomason, under the command of Comcortdiv Thirty-Seven.

On SS Iran Victory's third voyage she loaded at Port Chicago and traveled to Finchaven, Manus Island, Babelthuap, Leyte, Ulithi Atoll, Guam and home to San Pedro, Los Angeles. On 11 March 1945 while she was at the Ulithi Atoll the aircraft carrier USS Randolph was hit by a Kamikaze plane while Iran Victory was berthed next to her.

During the Korean War Iran Victory transported ammunition, mail, food and other supplies as part of the merchant marine support that moved about 90 percent of supplies to the war zone. She was subsequently laid up at Astoria, Oregon, with the National Defense Reserve Fleet some time between April 1954 and April 1955.

== Service as USS Belmont ==
In February 1963, Iran Victory was acquired by the U.S. Navy and entered the Willamette Iron and Steel Co. yard at Portland, Oregon for conversion to a spy ship, the first in her class of larger electronic spy vessels. On 8 June 1963, she was renamed USS Belmont, the second naval vessel of that name, and designated a miscellaneous auxiliary AG-167. She was redesignated a technical research ship AGTR-4 on 1 April 1964, and was commissioned at the Puget Sound Naval Shipyard on 2 November 1964.

Belmont completed outfitting at Puget Sound during November 1964, and on 2 December 1964 departed Bremerton, Washington, bound for her permanent assignment with the U.S. Atlantic Fleet at her new homeport, Norfolk, Virginia. She arrived there on 21 December 1964 and, exactly one month later, got underway for a five-week cruise to the West Indies, which included shakedown training and concluded with port visits to Kingston, Jamaica, and Key West, Florida. She returned to Hampton Roads, Virginia, on 1 March 1965 and entered the Norfolk Naval Shipyard for a month of post-shakedown availability. Final acceptance trials occupied 29 and 30 March 1965, and preparations for her first operational deployment followed.

=== Deployment in Atlantic and South American waters ===
On 26 April, Belmont passed between the Virginia Capes into the Atlantic Ocean and laid in a course for the West Indies. Two days at sea, the ship received orders to proceed to the vicinity of the Dominican Republic where, four days earlier, a revolt of left-wing factions had broken out. Belmont remained on station observing conditions until the middle of July. On 13 May, she headed back to Norfolk where she arrived four days later. After almost two months in port, the ship once more got underway on 14 September and spent about a month cruising in the West Indies before transiting the Panama Canal in mid-October. For the remainder of the year, she conducted operations along the western coast of South America, including visits to Valparaíso, Chile, and Callao, Peru.

New Year's Day 1966 found her at anchor in Callao. Two days later she weighed anchor to return to the Panama Canal Zone. Belmont retransited the canal on 21 January 1966 and moored in Norfolk on the 28th, where she remained for almost seven weeks for upkeep and shipyard availability. On 16 March 1966, the ship embarked upon another deployment to the western coast of South America. She transited the Panama Canal on 28 and 29 March 1966 and, for the next eight weeks, cruised along the coasts of Peru and Chile. Belmont returned to the Panama Canal Zone for a five-day visit between 23 and 28 May 1966. On the latter day, she departed Panama and embarked upon five weeks of operations in order to spy on French atomic tests in French Polynesia (12 June 1966). The ship arrived back in the Panama Canal Zone on 13 July 1966, transited the canal the next day, and reentered Norfolk on 20 July.

After seven weeks of upkeep in her homeport, Belmont stood out to sea on 7 September 1966, bound for her third assignment in the Pacific coastal waters of South America. She transited the Panama Canal again on 19 September 1966, and two days later shaped a course for her zone of operations. At the conclusion of that assignment, the ship returned to the Canal Zone on 4 November 1966. She proceeded through the canal on 8 November 1966 and then set course for Norfolk. Belmont reentered her homeport on 14 November 1966, and spent the remainder of the year in the Norfolk Naval Shipyard installing communication gear.

The spy ship spent the first month of 1967 completing the installation of her new communications equipment and testing it. On 1 February 1967, Belmont loosed her mooring lines to begin an extended cruise to the Southern Hemisphere, one that included a circumnavigation of the South American continent. Hydrographic and communications research highlighted the five-month voyage as did visits to sundry South American ports. Belmont completed her circuit of the South American continent on 3 June 1967 when she transited the Panama Canal and laid in a course for Norfolk. The technical research ship pulled into her homeport on 9 June 1967 and commenced a repair period. Her hull and various items of equipment received repairs over the next two months.

On 14 August 1967, she stood out of the Chesapeake Bay bound for the Indian Ocean. The ship rounded the Cape of Good Hope on 5 October 1967, and spent the following six weeks engaged in special operations along the eastern coast of Africa. On 22 November 1967, she redoubled the cape and, after an overnight stop at Monrovia, Liberia on 2 and 3 December 1967, pointed her bow west for the homeward voyage. Belmont arrived back at Norfolk on 12 December 1967, and spent the remainder of the year engaged in holiday leave and upkeep.

=== Indian Ocean operations ===
January 1968 found Belmont still at Norfolk. On 26 January, she began regular overhaul at the Norfolk Naval Shipyard. She emerged revitalized on 14 May 1968 and put to sea to conduct refresher training in the Guantanamo Bay, Cuba, operating area. The ship completed post-overhaul training on 14 June 1968 and, after a visit to San Juan, Puerto Rico, embarked upon her second deployment to the coasts of Africa. On 2 July 1968, she arrived off Cape Palmas and commenced operations along Africa's western coast. That phase of the assignment lasted until 25 September 1968, at which time she passed the Cape of Good Hope and entered the Indian Ocean. That portion of her mission proved relatively brief, occupying her time during the last week in September 1968 and the month of October 1968. On 1 November 1968, Belmont retraced her course around the Cape of Good Hope and steamed back into the Atlantic Ocean. The ship stopped over at Recife, Brazil, from 13 to 16 November 1968, and then headed for the northeastern coast of South America and a series of operations in that vicinity. Belmont completed the last mission of the cruise on 24 November 1968 and headed home. She moored at Norfolk on 28 November 1968 and remained there for the rest of 1968.

=== Operating with the U.S. Sixth Fleet ===
During the first half of 1969, Belmont stayed in or, infrequently, operated near Norfolk. A restricted availability followed by sea trials occupied the first three months of the year. Early in April 1969, she began installation of additional equipment. May 1969 brought tests and type training in the Virginia Capes operating area. In June 1969, she began preparations for overseas movement. On 17 June 1969, Belmont left her berth at the Norfolk Naval Station bound for her first and only tour of duty with the U.S. 6th Fleet in the Mediterranean. She passed through the Strait of Gibraltar on 28 June 1969 and joined the 6th Fleet, two years after the Israeli attack on her sister ship, USS Liberty. Over the next four months, Belmont ranged the length and breadth of the Mediterranean conducting a series of special operations and making stops at ports along the Mediterranean littoral. However, this technical research (spy) ship spent the majority of her time in the eastern portion of the sea near Kythira, Greece, and the island of Crete. Belmont concluded this last deployment of her career at Rota, Spain (never made it to Rota) on 21 October 1969, and steered a course back to the United States that same day.

=== Fate ===
Belmont arrived back in Norfolk on 3 November 1969. Three weeks later, the ship received the close scrutiny of a board of inspection and survey. As a result, she was found to be of limited naval value. Accordingly, Belmont was decommissioned at Norfolk on 16 January 1970, and her name was struck from the Naval Vessel Register that same day. On 24 June 1970, over 26 years after her construction during World War II, she was sold to the Boston Metals Co. in Baltimore, Maryland, for scrapping.
