= SS Bluefield Victory =

Victory ship of the United States

- Typical Victory Ship.

History

United States
- Name: Bluefield Victory
- Namesake: Bluefield, Virginia and Bluefield, West Virginia
- Owner: War Shipping Administration
- Operator: Mississippi Shipping Company
- Builder: California Shipbuilding Company, Los Angeles
- Laid down: March 7, 1944
- Launched: May 9, 1944
- Completed: June 30, 1944
- Fate: Sold, 1951

United States
- Name: Alaska Bear
- Owner: Pacific Far East Line of San Francisco. 1951 to 1957; Trans-Pacific Company of Philadelphia. 1957 to 1960; Long Island Tankers Corporation of Wilmington, Del. 1960 to 1962; Pacific Far East Line of San Francisco. 1962 to 1969
- Fate: Sold, 1969

United States
- Name: Columbia Wolf
- Owner: Columbia Steamship Company of San Francisco
- Fate: Scrapped in Hong Kong, 1970

General characteristics
- Class & type: VC2-S-AP3 Victory ship
- Tonnage: 7612 GRT, 4,553 NRT
- Displacement: 15,200 tons
- Length: 455 ft (139 m)
- Beam: 62 ft (19 m)
- Draught: 28 ft (8.5 m)
- Installed power: 8,500 shp (6,300 kW)
- Propulsion: HP & LP turbines geared to a single 20.5-foot (6.2 m) propeller, by Westinghouse Electric & Mfg. Co., Essington
- Speed: 16.5 knots
- Boats & landing craft carried: 4 Lifeboats
- Complement: 62 Merchant Marine and 28 US Naval Armed Guards
- Armament: 1 × 5 inch (127 mm)/38 caliber gun as Victory ship; 1 × 3 inch (76 mm)/50 caliber gun; 8 × 20 mm Oerlikon

SS Bluefield Victory was the 16th Victory ship built during World War II under the Emergency Shipbuilding program. She was launched by the California Shipbuilding Company on May 9, 1944, and completed on June 30, 1944. The ship’s United States Maritime Commission designation was VC2- S- AP3, hull number 15 (V-15). SS Bluefield Victory served in the Pacific Ocean during World War II and was operated by the Mississippi Shipping Company. The 10,500-ton Victory ships were designed to replace the earlier Liberty Ships. Liberty ships were designed to be used just for World War II. Victory ships were designed to last longer and serve the US Navy after the war. The Victory ship differed from a Liberty ship in that they were: faster, longer and wider, taller, had a thinner stack set farther toward the superstructure, and had a long raised forecastle.

== Christened ==
SS Bluefield Victory was christened by Mrs. Monroe Jackson of Oakland, California. The SS Bluefield Victory was launched into the waters of Wilmington, Los Angeles. She was part of a group of 218 Victory Ships were named for American cities. SS Bluefield Victory took part in the Battle of Leyte from June 1944 to January 1945.

== World War II ==
SS Bluefield Victory steamed into the Pacific to bring supplies to the Pacific War troops. On October 20, 1944, the SS Bluefield Victory had the dangerous job of delivering ammunition for troops. The ammunition was for the US Central Philippine Attack Force. Bluefield Victory downed a plane on December 11, 1944 and had a bomb miss her by about 50 feet. She was in a convoy of ships that anchored at Naval Base Kossol Roads in October 1944. Because of her dangerous cargo, she stayed in Kossol Roads away from the main fleet until called on to deliver supplies. The convoy included: ammunition ships: Meridian Victory, SS Iran Victory, SS Bluefield Victory and Kishwaukee. It was escorted by the destroyer escorts: Lovelace, Neuendorf, Thomason, under the command of Comcortdiv Thirty-Seven. She supplied the destroyer USS Fletcher (DD-445) with ammunition on February 20, 1945, at Mangarin Bay In March 1945 the SS Bluefield Victory anchored at the Ulithi atoll and supplied ammunition to a number of ships at the Leyte-Samar Naval Base for the Battle of Leyte and other actions.

== Post-war ==
In 1948 the SS Bluefield Victory was laid up in the National Defense Reserve Fleet at Mobile, Alabama. In 1950 she was reactivated to take supplies to Korea.

== Korean War ==
SS Bluefield Victory (V-4377, ID 246004) served as Merchant Marine Naval ship supplying goods for the Korean War. She made nine trips to Korea. She help move the 140th Medium Tank Battalion. About 75 percent of the personnel taken to Korea for the Korean War came by the Merchant Marine Ships. SS Bluefield Victory transported goods, mail, food and other supplies. About 90 percent of the cargo was moved by Merchant Marine Naval to the Korea War Zone. SS Bluefield Victory made trips between the US and Korea helping American forces engaged against Communist aggression in South Korea.

== Private cargo service ==
In 1951 she was sold to the Pacific Far East Line of San Francisco. and was renamed the SS Alaska Bear. In 1957 she was sold to the Trans-Pacific Company of Philadelphia and kept her name. On June 7, 1957, the SS Alaska Bear ran aground and was taking on water near the entrance to Tokyo Bay. The USS Current, a rescue and salvage ship came to her aid, and pumped water out of flooded cargo holds. They unload the cargo and then towed the Alaska Bear to deeper water. The USS Current worked on her for days. Then towed her to the Port of Yokosuka at Yokohama, Japan on June 21, 1957. In 1960 she was sold and kept her name to the Long Island Tankers Corporation of Wilmington, Delaware In 1962 she was sold back to the Pacific Far East Line of San Francisco and kept her name. In 1969 she was sold to the Columbia Steamship Company of San Francisco and renamed the SS Columbia Wolf. In 1970 she was towed to Hong Kong and scrapped.

== See also ==
- List of Victory ships
- Liberty ship
- Type C1 ship
- Type C2 ship
- Type C3 ship

== Sources ==
- Sawyer, L.A. and W.H. Mitchell. Victory ships and tankers: The history of the ‘Victory’ type cargo ships and of the tankers built in the United States of America during World War II, Cornell Maritime Press, 1974, 0-87033-182-5.
- United States Maritime Commission:
- Victory Cargo Ships
