= USS Kern =

Patapsco-class gasoline tanker

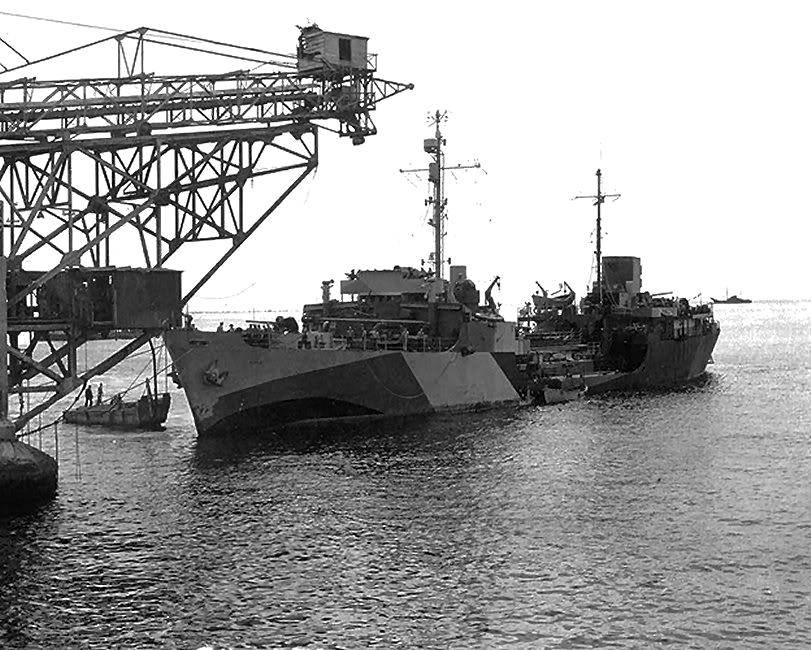

History

United States
- Name: USS Kern
- Namesake: Kern River in California
- Ordered: as Rappahannock; T1-MT-M1 tanker hull
- Builder: Seattle-Tacoma Shipbuilding Corporation
- Laid down: 25 May 1942
- Launched: 7 September 1942
- Commissioned: as USS Kern (AOG-2), 9 March 1943
- Decommissioned: 6 August 1946
- In service: to MSTS as USNS Kern (T-AOG-2), 1 July 1950
- Out of service: 1 October 1957
- Stricken: 10 April 1958
- Fate: Disposed of by Scrapping, National Metal & Steel, Terminal Island, Ca 2 December 1975

General characteristics
- Class & type: Patapsco-class gasoline tanker
- Tonnage: 2,210 long tons deadweight (DWT)
- Displacement: 1,850 long tons (1,880 t) light; 4,130 long tons (4,200 t) full load
- Length: 310 ft 9 in (94.72 m)
- Beam: 48 ft 6 in (14.78 m)
- Draft: 15 ft 8 in (4.78 m)
- Installed power: 3,300 hp (2,500 kW)
- Propulsion: 4 × General Electric diesel-electric engines, 2 × shafts
- Speed: 15.5 kn (17.8 mph; 28.7 km/h)
- Complement: 131
- Armament: 4 × 3 in (76 mm)/50 cal dual purpose guns, 12 × 20 mm anti-aircraft cannons

USS Kern (AOG-2) was a Patapsco-class gasoline tanker acquired by the United States Navy for the dangerous task of transporting gasoline to warships in the fleet, and to remote Navy stations.

Kern was laid as Rappahannock by Seattle-Tacoma Shipbuilding Corporation, Tacoma, Washington on 25 May 1942; renamed Kern on 18 July 1942; launched on 7 September 1942; sponsored by Mrs. L. A. Oldin; and commissioned at Seattle, Washington on 9 March 1943.

== World War II ==
Departing Seattle, Washington on 24 March, Kern arrived San Pedro, California on 28 March for shakedown. On 12 April, she joined a convoy out of Los Angeles, California, and reached Pearl Harbor on the 22nd. Loaded with aviation gas and diesel oil, she steamed to Midway Island from 8–12 June. She returned to Pearl Harbor on 18 June, and from 27 June-11 July she made a similar run to Canton and Palmyra Islands.

During the next year, Kern continued tanker operations out of Pearl Harbor, supplying American bases on Midway, Canton, and Palmyra Islands with gasoline and oil. Departing Pearl Harbor on 19 August 1944, she sailed to Eniwetok, Marshalls, where she arrived on 31 August and served as station tanker during September. She departed Eniwetok on 5 October and carried gasoline to the Marianas and Naval Base Ulithi before reaching Naval Base Kossol Roads, Palaus on 28 October.

=== End-of-war operations ===
From November 1944-July 1945, Kern served as a station tanker at Kossol Roads and as a shuttle tanker to Peleliu and Angaur. In addition, she made replenishment runs between the Palaus and Ulithi during March, May, and June. During which Commanding Officer LTjg Robert G. Molin was assigned on 1 April. Departing Kossol on 21 July, she steamed via Ulithi to Guam where she arrived on 6 August for overhaul.

== Post-war service ==
Following the end of hostilities in the Pacific Ocean, Kern returned to Ulithi on 31 August. She steamed to Okinawa from 17 to 21 September and served as station tanker until sailing for Japan on 13 October. She reached Hiro Wan, Honshū on 15 September and began refueling ships in support of occupation operations in Japan. She operated along the coast of Japan until 31 January 1946, when she departed Sasebo, Kyūshū, for Korea. She arrived Jinsen on 2 February, served there as a station tanker, then sailed for Japan on 15 April. The veteran tanker arrived Kobe, Honshū on 18 April and resumed refueling duties along the coast of Japan. She decommissioned at Yokosuka, Honshū on 6 August and was transferred to the United States Army the same day.

=== Assigned to MSTS during the Korean War ===
Reacquired by the Navy on 1 July 1950, Kern was assigned to the Military Sea Transportation Service (MSTS). Crewed by civilians, she operated in the Western Pacific. During the effort to repel Communist aggression in Korea, she supplied fighting ships of the mighty 7th Fleet with gasoline and oil.

=== Post-Korean War operations ===
After the end of the Korean War, she continued to operate in the Pacific as the might of U.S. seapower sought to keep the peace in the tense Far East. She was inactivated at San Francisco, California in September 1956 and was berthed in the National Defense Reserve Fleet at Suisun Bay, California from 28 September-30 April 1957.

==== Reactivated for Arctic operations ====
During the late spring and throughout the summer of 1957, she returned to tanker duty for Naval replenishment operations in the Arctic Ocean north of Alaska.

== Decommissioning and Fate ==
She was again inactivated at San Francisco, California on 1 October 1957. She entered the National Defense Reserve Fleet at Suisun Bay and remained under MSTS control until 10 April 1958, when she was struck from the Naval Vessel Register and transferred to the Maritime Administration. She remained berthed at Suisun Bay, California, until she was sold on 2 December 1975 to the National Metal & Steel Corp, Terminal Island, Ca as part of a lot of 4 vessels for $528,529.19. She departed the Suisun Bay Fleet on 16 December 1975 and was scrapped shortly afterwards.

== Honors ==
Eligible crew members of Kern could claim the following medals:

- China Service Medal (extended)
- American Campaign Medal
- Asiatic-Pacific Campaign Medal
- World War II Victory Medal
- Navy Occupation Service Medal (with Asia clasp)
- National Defense Service Medal
- Korean Service Medal
- United Nations Service Medal
- Republic of Korea War Service Medal (retroactive)
