= USS Octorara (IX-139) =

Tanker

History

United States
- Name: USS Octorara
- Namesake: A creek in Pennsylvania named for an Indian word meaning running water.
- Builder: Southern shipbuilding Co., San Pedro, California
- Launched: 10 September 1921
- Christened: as La Purisima
- Acquired: 11 September 1944
- Commissioned: 11 September 1944 at Oakland, California
- Decommissioned: 8 April 1946
- Stricken: 1947 (est.)
- Fate: Sold 28 February 1947 and scrapped

General characteristics
- Displacement: 11,579 tons
- Length: 407.4 ft (124.2 m)
- Beam: 51 ft (16 m)
- Draft: 25.5 ft (7.8 m)
- Speed: 10 knots (19 km/h)
- Complement: 88
- Armament: 2 × 3 in (76 mm) gun mounts

USS Octorara (IX-139) was a tanker originally loaned to the Soviet Union during World War II and then returned to the United States in 1944. She was then commissioned by the U.S. Navy and served as a tanker for the remainder of the war.

== Leased to the USSR ==
Octorara, a tanker built in 1921 as La Purisima by Southern shipbuilding Co., San Pedro, California, was lent to the Soviet Union under Lend-Lease early in World War II.

== World War II service ==
=== Commissioned at Oakland, California ===
Upon return to the United States she was acquired by the U.S. Navy 11 September 1944; and commissioned the same day at Moore Dry Dock Company, Oakland, California.

=== Assigned to the Pacific campaign ===
Octorara was assigned to Service Squadron 8 Pacific Fleet. After necessary repairs, the tanker loaded a cargo of bunker oil and 100 octane gasoline and on 14 October 1944 departed San Francisco Bay for the Marshall Islands.

Arriving Eniwetok, via Pearl Harbor, 6 November, she discharged diesel oil to Beagle and on the 15th got under way with a convoy for the Caroline Islands. Octorara remained at Ulithi for a month (21 November–22 December), dispensing diesel and aviation gasoline to the Fleet, before proceeding to Kossol Roads, Palau Islands, for fueling operations until June 1945.

Octorara departed Kossol Roads 7 June 1945, and on the 10th arrived in San Pedro Bay, Leyte, Philippine Islands. She continued fueling operations in the Pacific Ocean until after the Empire of Japan surrendered.

== Post-war decommissioning ==
Returning to the U.S. East Coast early in 1946, the tanker decommissioned 8 April and was transferred to the War Shipping Administration the same day. She was sold to Pinto Island Metal Co. 28 February 1947 and scrapped.
