= USS Control =

Minesweeper of the United States Navy

History

United States
- Name: USS Control
- Builder: Willamette Iron and Steel Works
- Laid down: 15 June 1942
- Launched: 28 January 1943
- Commissioned: 11 May 1944
- Decommissioned: 6 June 1946
- Reclassified: MSF-164, 7 February 1955
- Fate: Sold for scrap 30 March 1959

General characteristics
- Class & type: Admirable-class minesweeper
- Displacement: 650 tons
- Length: 184 ft 6 in (56.24 m)
- Beam: 33 ft (10 m)
- Draft: 9 ft 9 in (2.97 m)
- Propulsion: 2 × ALCO 539 diesel engines, 1,710 shp (1.3 MW); Farrel-Birmingham single reduction gear; 2 shafts
- Speed: 14.8 knots (27.4 km/h)
- Complement: 104
- Armament: 1 × 3"/50 caliber gun DP; 2 × twin Bofors 40 mm guns; 1 × Hedgehog anti-submarine mortar; 2 × Depth charge tracks

Service record
- Part of: US Pacific Fleet (1944–1946)

USS Control (AM-164) was an Admirable-class minesweeper built for the U.S. Navy during World War II. She was built to clear minefields in offshore waters, and served the Navy in the Pacific Ocean.

She was launched 28 January 1943 by Willamette Iron and Steel Works, Portland, Oregon; and commissioned 11 May 1944.

== World War II Pacific Ocean operations ==
Control reached Pearl Harbor 29 July 1944, and during August removed mines previously planted in the defenses of French Frigate Shoals. Between 5 September and 30 November, Control patrolled and escorted ships from Eniwetok to Saipan, Ulithi, and Manus, then sailed to Kossol Roads for patrol duty off the Palaus until arriving at Guam 1 February 1945 to sweep Apra Harbor. She returned to convoy escort duty from Eniwetok until June, when she put back to Pearl Harbor for brief overhaul.

Between 1 July 1945 and 11 August, Control cleared the harbor at Eniwetok and planted navigational buoys there.

== Post-War Decommissioning ==
After serving at Okinawa between 25 September and 13 October, she returned to the west coast, and was decommissioned and placed in reserve at San Diego, California, 6 June 1946. Her classification was changed to MSF-164 on 7 February 1955. Control was sold on 30 March 1959.
