= USS Sebec =

Oiler of the United States Navy

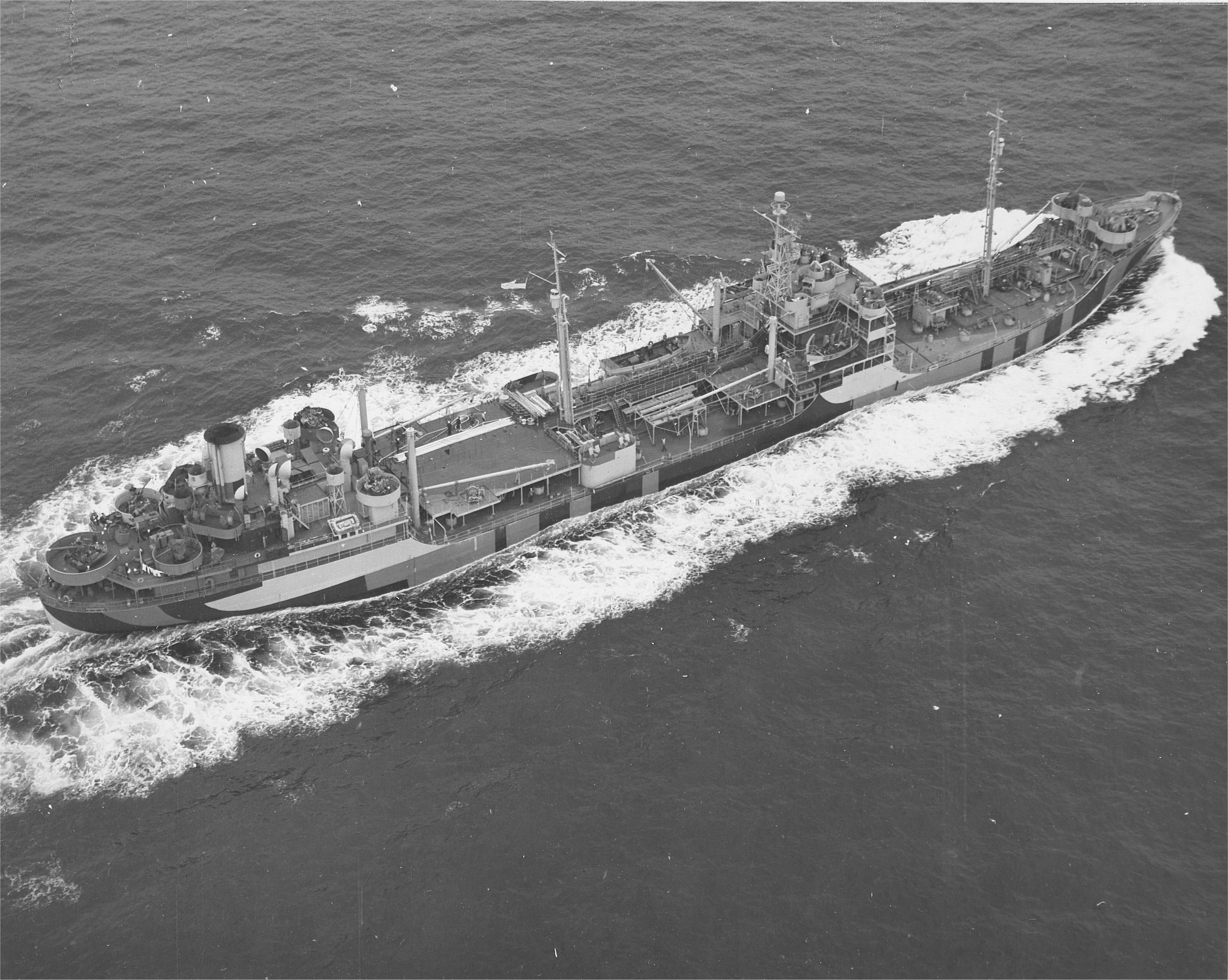

History

United States
- Name: USS Sebec
- Namesake: Sebec River in Maine
- Builder: Marinship, Sausalito, California
- Laid down: 20 May 1943
- Launched: 29 July 1943
- Commissioned: 29 March 1944
- Decommissioned: 7 February 1946
- Stricken: 26 February 1946
- In service: 1950, as USNS Sebec (T-AO-87)
- Out of service: 22 December 1955
- Stricken: 22 December 1955
- Reinstated: 28 April 1950
- Reinstated: 21 July 1956
- In service: 1956
- Out of service: 3 September 1957
- Stricken: 3 September 1957
- Honors and awards: 6 battle stars (World War II)
- Fate: Acquired by the US Army, 9 June 1966; Sold for scrapping, 9 September 1974

General characteristics
- Type: Escambia-class replenishment oiler
- Displacement: 5,782 long tons (5,875 t) light; 21,880 long tons (22,231 t) full
- Length: 523 ft 6 in (159.56 m)
- Beam: 68 ft (21 m)
- Draft: 30 ft 10 in (9.40 m)
- Propulsion: Turbo-electric, single screw, 8,000 shp (5,966 kW)
- Speed: 15 knots (28 km/h; 17 mph)
- Capacity: 140,000 barrels (22,000 m^{3})
- Complement: 267
- Armament: 1 × 5"/38 caliber dual purpose gun; 4 × 3"/50 caliber guns; 4 × twin 40 mm guns; 4 × twin 20 mm guns

USS Sebec (AO-87) was a Escambia-class fleet oiler acquired by the United States Navy for use during World War II. She had the dangerous but necessary task of providing fuel to vessels in combat and non-combat areas primarily in the Pacific Ocean. For her valiant efforts, she received six battle stars during the war.

Sebec, a type T2-SE-A2 tanker hull, was laid down under a Maritime Commission contract (MC hull 1266) on 20 May 1943 by the Marinship Corp. of Sausalito, California. Launched on 29 July 1943, sponsored by Mrs. E. B. Fox, she was delivered to the Kaiser Swan Island Yard, Portland, Oregon, for completion and conversion to an oiler, and accepted and commissioned by the Navy on 29 March 1944.

== World War II Pacific Theatre operations ==
After shakedown off San Diego, California, Sebec steamed to San Pedro, California, arriving on 16 June. Two days later, she departed the U.S. West Coast and arrived Pearl Harbor on the 24th.

On 28 June, Sebec's task unit got underway for the Marshall Islands. Anchoring at Eniwetok on 6 July, Sebec loaded a cargo of fuel oil, diesel oil, gasoline, and light freight before standing out of the harbor on 15 July. After refueling units of Task Force 58 on 22 July, Sebec's unit arrived off Agat, Guam, on the 24th. On the 27th, after discharging the remainder of her cargo fuel oil, diesel oil, and part of her gasoline, Sebec got underway on the 28th and arrived at Eniwetok on 1 August.

Sebec departed Eniwetok on 20 August and arrived at Seeadler Harbor, Manus island, Admiralty Islands, on the 28th. She set out the next day, fueled vessels on 3 September, and returned to the harbor on the 6th. She spent the next two months performing similar assignments.

== Sinking of the Mississinewa ==
On 2 November, Sebec anchored at Ulithi, West Carolines. On 20 November, Mississinewa (AO-59) exploded in her berth 2,500 yards from Sebec, hit by a Japanese "Kaiten" manned torpedo, launched from an enemy submarine nearby.

The next morning Sebec got underway for Kossol Roads, Palau Islands, anchoring at Kossol Passage on the 22nd. On the 30th, all ships were ordered underway at various speeds and courses to avoid air attack. Sebec's crew sighted bomb splashes, but saw no aircraft. The oiler spent the remainder of 1944 on fueling tasks, including a 24-hour fueling assignment of an escort carrier division on 30 and 31 December.

== Danger from Japanese submarines ==
Sebec arrived at Ulithi on 4 January 1945. On the 12th, she sounded general quarters after Mazama (AE-9) was hit by a torpedo while in berth there. Four times that day, the crew was ordered to general quarters in response to reports of enemy submarines nearby.

On 20 January, Sebec got underway in a convoy bound for Eniwetok. On the 24th, she left the convoy and proceeded independently to Hawaii. She arrived at Pearl Harbor on 1 February for emergency repairs.

Sebec departed Pearl Harbor on 19 March bound for Ulithi, carrying a cargo of fuel oil, diesel oil, and aviation gasoline. After arrival on 1 April, Sebec resumed her fueling operations.

On 4 May, Sebec received orders to proceed independently to Hagushi Beach, Okinawa. From 8 to 12 May, she fueled screening vessels off the transport area before returning to Ulithi on the 16th.

== End-of-war activity ==
During a typhoon on 5 June, two of her gasoline pumps were damaged. The following evening, the oiler got underway for Okinawa, arriving at Hagushi Beach on 7 June.

From 8 June through 26 September, Sebec participated in additional fueling operations. On the 27th, she received orders to report to Tokyo Bay.

Sebec remained in Tokyo Bay from 2 to 11 October. On the 12th, she got underway with Lackawanna (AO-40) for San Francisco, California, anchoring on the 24th. On 29 October, she unloaded all her ammunition at the Mare Island Ammunition Depot and returned to the anchorage.

== Post-war transfer to MSTS ==
Sebec was decommissioned on 7 February 1946 and was struck from the Navy List on 26 February. On 1 July, she was transferred to the Maritime Commission, but was reinstated on the Navy List on 28 April 1950, and assigned to Military Sea Transportation Service as the non-commissioned naval vessel USNS Sebec (T-AO-87), manned by a civilian crew.

== Korean War operations ==
She shuttled between Alaskan and Caribbean waters until January 1951 when she departed the West Indies for a round-the-world cruise via the Suez Canal and the Panama Canal, returning to Aruba on 16 October. During the latter part of the Korean War, Sebec carried fuel oil from Bahrain, Persian Gulf, to Okinawa and Japan.

Sebec arrived at Long Beach, California, on Christmas Eve 1953, but began the new year getting underway for Pearl Harbor. After returning to San Pedro, California, Sebec sailed again, arriving at Kaohsiung, Taiwan, on 4 June; thence she proceeded to Manila, the Persian Gulf, and Japan before returning to the West Coast. In the next year, Sebec operated in Alaska as well as in the Far East.

On 22 December 1955, Sebec was placed in the National Defense Reserve Fleet at Suisun Bay, California, and struck from the Navy List. She was reinstated on the Navy List on 21 June 1956 and operated for MSTS by the Joshua Hendy Corp.

== Transferred to U.S. Army service ==
Sebec was returned to the Maritime Administration (MARAD) and struck from the Navy List on 3 September 1957. She was acquired to the United States Army on 9 June 1966, and converted to a floating power station at Bender Shipbuilding and Repair Co., Mobile, Alabama, before seeing service in Vietnam.

== Final decommissioning ==
Title to Sebec was transferred to MARAD for the US Army, the ship was subsequently sold for scrapping, to Dongkuk Steel Co., Ltd., Seoul, South Korea, on 9 September 1974.

== Awards ==
Sebec received six battle stars for World War II service.
