= USS Oriole (AMCU-33) =

United States Navy landing craft

History

United States
- Name: USS Oriole
- Builder: Consolidated Steel Corporation, Orange, Texas
- Laid down: 11 March 1944
- Launched: 5 April 1944
- Commissioned: 30 May 1944, as USS LCI(L)-973
- Decommissioned: March 1946
- Recommissioned: 20 February 1954, as USS Oriole (AMCU-33)
- Decommissioned: 7 July 1955
- Reclassified: LSIL-973, 28 February 1949; AMCU-33, March 1952; MHC-33, 1 February 1955
- Stricken: 1 January 1960
- Fate: Sold, 27 March 1961

General characteristics
- Class & type: LCI(L)-351-class large landing craft
- Displacement: 381 long tons (387 t)
- Length: 159 ft (48 m)
- Beam: 23 ft 8 in (7.21 m)
- Draft: 5 ft 8 in (1.73 m)
- Propulsion: 8 × GM diesel engines (4 per shaft), 1,600 bhp (1,193 kW); 2 × variable pitch propellers
- Speed: 14.4 knots (26.7 km/h; 16.6 mph)
- Complement: 40
- Armament: 5 × single 20 mm AA guns

USS Oriole (AMCU-33) was a LCI(L)-351-class large landing craft of the United States Navy, later converted to an AMCU-7-class coastal minesweeper.

The ship was laid down on 11 March 1944 at Consolidated Steel Corporation at, Orange, Texas, launched on 5 April 1944, and commissioned on 30 May 1944, as USS LCI(L)-973.

== World War II Pacific operations ==
This infantry landing craft conducted shakedown out of Galveston, Texas in June 1944 before sailing later in the month to San Diego, California. After a summer of training operations LCI(L)–973 departed the West Coast in September for Hawaii and the southern Pacific area. Proceeding by stages, she arrived Palau Islands on 29 December. Assigned to picket duty with the Palau LCI Force, the landing craft's mission was to prevent the reinforcement of, or offensive action from, by-passed enemy held islands. From March to June 1945 the craft sailed the Kossol-Peleliu mail run but after the installation of a searchlight in June she drew nightly duty on station in the Middle Lagoon.

== End of War assignments ==
Following the Japanese capitulation, with LCI Group 37, she arrived Guam on 16 September to shuttle dischargees to Saipan. Steaming via Okinawa the group moored Tientsin, China on 11 October to assist in the realignment of American and Chinese personnel along the Chinese coast. China service and occupation duty terminated on 16 December as LCI(L)–973 headed homeward. Returning to the East Coast she decommissioned at Green Cove Springs, Florida, in March 1946.

== Korean War operations ==
In March 1952, while the Korean War raged, this Reserve Fleet craft was named and designated USS Oriole (AMCU–33). Three months later she was reactivated for duty in the 5th Naval District and after additional modification, recommissioned at Charleston, South Carolina, on 20 February 1954. Though assigned to the 4th Naval District on 1 April, the ship returned south for four months of mine detection operations off Little Creek, Virginia, in 1954 and in March 1955 participated in LANTMINEX. By this time her designation had changed to a coastal mine hunter and her status to that of an active Reserve Fleet ship.

== Final decommissioning ==
Oriole was decommissioned on 7 July 1955, struck from the Navy List on 1 January 1960, and sold on 27 March 1961 to Ships and Power, Inc. Miami, Florida.
