= SS Elmira Victory =

Victory ship of World War II

- Typical Victory Ship.

History

United States
- Name: SS Elmira Victory
- Namesake: Elmira, New York
- Owner: War Shipping Administration
- Operator: Isbrandtsen Line, Alaska SS company
- Builder: Oregon Shipbuilding Company
- Laid down: March 25, 1944
- Launched: May 12, 1944
- Completed: May 31, 1944
- Identification: IMO number: 5102384
- Fate: Scrapped

General characteristics
- Class & type: VC2-S-AP3 Victory ship
- Tonnage: 7612 GRT, 4,553 NRT
- Displacement: 15,200 tons
- Length: 455 ft (139 m)
- Beam: 62 ft (19 m)
- Draft: 28 ft (8.5 m)
- Installed power: 8,500 shp (6,300 kW)
- Propulsion: HP & LP turbines geared to a single 20.5-foot (6.2 m) propeller
- Speed: 16.5 knots
- Boats & landing craft carried: 4 Lifeboats
- Complement: 62 Merchant Marine and 28 US Naval Armed Guards
- Armament: 1 × 5 inch (127 mm)/38 caliber gun; 1 × 3 inch (76 mm)/50 caliber gun; 8 × 20 mm Oerlikon

SS Elmira Victory was a Victory ship built during World War II under the Emergency Shipbuilding program. It was built and launched by the Oregon Shipbuilding Corporation on May 12, 1944, and completed on May 31, 1944. The ship's United States Maritime Commission designation was VC2-S-AP3 and hull number 105 (1021). The ship was Oregon Shipbuilding Corporation's 21st victory ship. The Maritime Commission turned it over for Merchant navy operation to a civilian contractor, the Isthmian Steamship Company under the United States Merchant Marine act for the War Shipping Administration. She was named after the city of Elmira, New York.

Victory ships were designed to supersede the earlier Liberty Ships. Unlike Liberty ships, Victory ships were designed to serve the US Navy after the war and also last longer. The Victory ship differed from a Liberty ship in that they were: faster, longer and wider, taller, and had a thinner stack set farther toward the superstructure. They also had a long raised forecastle.

== World War II ==
SS Elmira Victory has had the dangerous job of delivering 6,000 pounds of ammunition for troops in the Pacific War during World War II. The SS Elmira Victory ammunition ship was loaded with 6,000 pounds of ammunition and steamed to Ulithi. Ulithi is an atoll in the Caroline Islands used a fleet meeting spot and staging area for the US Navy's western Pacific operations. The Battle of Leyte ended on 26 December 1944. On 21 December 1944 SS Elmira Victory supplied cargo to five Landing Craft Infantry. On 12 January 1945 at 8:00am off the west coast of Luzon Philippines, Kamikaze plane attacked and damaged Elmira Victory. At the time she was being operated by the Alaska SS company. She has just steamed from Naval Base Kossol Roads in a convoy, under the protection of the destroyer, USS Stanly. The first Kamikaze plane crashed into her #5 cargo hold cover and did minor damage. But, a second plane hit the ship's side near the superstructure. A bomb on the plane exploded and started a fire on the deck and a life boat. The fire dropped into hold #4, which held bombs, but the crew was able to put the fire out before any detonated. The same day, 12 January 1945, near Elmira Victory kamikazes damaged the destroyer escorts USS Richard W. Suesens and USS Gilligan. Also the damaged was the transport USS Zeilin, and the Landing Ship, Tank LST-700. The USS Zeilin lost 129 of her 506 Army troops, being transported. Shells on the destroyer escorts exploded and did some damage to Elmira Victory also. Six Elmira Victory crew members were injured in the plane explosion, there was no loss of life in attack. The attacks were at 16°11'N, 120°20'E. Elmira Victory serviced at Leyte Gulf with other ammunition Victory ships like USS Provo Victory, USS Boulder Victory. At Leyte Gulf she also worked with other ammunition ships like USS Sangay, USS Mauna Loa, USS Shasta, USS Lassen, USS Mount Baker, USS Nitro, USS Alamosa, and USS Mount Hood that exploded during the operation from an unknown cause.

After the war in 1949, Elmira Victory was laid up in the National Defense Reserve Fleet at the Hudson River and later transferred to Suisun Bay National Defense Reserve Fleet.

== Korean War ==
In 1950, Elmira Victory was put back in service for the Korean War as a Military Sea Transportation Service (MSTS) charter for the United States Navy operated by the American Export Lines. Elmira Victory made trips between 1950 and 1951, helping American forces engaged against North Korean aggression in South Korea.

== Vietnam War ==
Elmira Victory serviced in Vietnam War from November 1966 to March 1967. Elmira Victory was hit by enemy gun fire while waiting to offload ammunition in Qui Nhơn harbor, with no casualties.

In 1993 she was scrapped.

== Honors ==
Elmira Victory earned Battle stars for her action at the Lingayen Gulf landing from 11 January 1945 to 18 January 1945.

== See also ==
- List of Victory ships
- Liberty ship
- Type C1 ship
- Type C2 ship
- Type C3 ship

== Sources ==
- Sawyer, L.A. and W.H. Mitchell. Victory ships and tankers: The history of the ‘Victory type" cargo ships and of the tankers built in the United States of America during World War II, Cornell Maritime Press, 1974, 0-87033-182-5.
- United States Maritime Commission:
- Victory Cargo Ships
