= USS Big Horn (AO-45) =

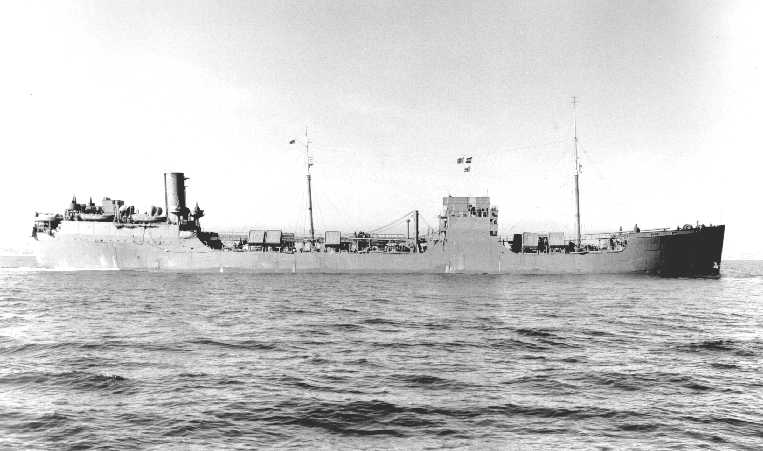
- USS Big Horn

History

United States
- Name: USS Big Horn
- Namesake: Bighorn River
- Launched: 2 May 1936
- Acquired: 31 March 1942
- Commissioned: 15 April 1942 as AO-45, 17 January 1944 as WAO-124, 1 February 1945 as IX-207
- Decommissioned: 6 May 1946
- Stricken: 3 July 1946
- Fate: Sold for disposal, 22 November 1946

General characteristics
- Tonnage: 7,096 GRT
- Length: 441 ft 8 in (134.62 m)
- Beam: 64 ft (20 m)
- Propulsion: Single screw
- Speed: 13 knots (24 km/h)
- Complement: 13 officers and 157 men
- Sensors & processing systems: One Model JK-9 listening equipment
- Armament: Five 4 in (100 mm) /50 guns, two 0.5 in (12.7 mm) machine guns, five Thompson submachine guns, five sawn-off shotguns

USS Big Horn (AO-45/WAO-124/IX-207) was a Q-ship of the United States Navy named for the Bighorn River of Wyoming and Montana.

== History ==
Gulf Dawn, a single-screw oil tanker, was built in 1936 at Chester, Pennsylvania, by the Sun Shipbuilding & Drydock Corp. and operated by the Gulf Oil Corporation.

=== Navy Service ===
Acquired by the Navy on 31 March 1942, she was renamed Big Horn and given the hull designation symbol AO-45 on 3 April 1942. Her conversion began at the Bethlehem Shipyard in Brooklyn, New York. She was commissioned 15 April 1942, under the command of Commander James A. Gainard, USNR, formerly master of SS City of Flint, which had become the center of an international incident at the beginning of the war, and was later sunk by a U-boat.

==== Atlantic Fleet ====
Sailing to Boston on 23 April, Big Horn entered the Boston Navy Yard for conversion to a Q-ship. A disguised heavily armed merchantman, the decoy ship was intended to lure unsuspecting U-boats to the surface and sink them with gunfire. While at Boston, Big Horn completed her disguise as a fleet oiler and was given extra watertight integrity – in case she was torpedoed – by the installation of thousands of sealed empty drums in her cargo tanks. That work was completed on 22 July 1942.

After two days on the degaussing range and in calibrating compasses and radio direction finders, Big Horn proceeded to Casco Bay for training under Commander, Destroyers, Atlantic Fleet. This training period was followed by a shakedown cruise which was completed on 26 August 1942, at which date USS Big Horn put in again at the Navy Yard, Boston, for further alterations and repairs until 12 September.

As U-boats had been attacking bauxite ore cargo ships in the West Indies, the Q-ship sailed south to help defend the convoy routes there on 27 September.

1942

The first cruise of USS Big Horn began on 27 September 1942, when the ship proceeded from New York with a convoy bound for Guantánamo Bay, Cuba, taking a position which permitted the vessel to act as a straggler. The trip was made without incident, and thereafter Big Horn was semi-attached to NOB [Naval Operating Base] Trinidad, with orders to operate from that base over the bauxite route to and from ports where that commodity was loaded. Many ships in this area had been sunk in recent weeks. Ships proceeding from Trinidad were convoyed to a designated point from which they fanned out to take various routes to their ultimate destination. Big Horn was directed to proceed to that point and drop down on independent routes to and from bauxite ports.

After joining south-bound convoy GAT-11 at Guantánamo Bay, the ship – using her old call sign of Gulf Dawn – purposefully lagged behind the convoy en route to Trinidad. No U-boats were tempted to attack, however, and the ship moored in Port of Spain on 9 October.

On 16 October 1942, Big Horn sailed in convoy T-19 from Trinidad to the point of separation. That same afternoon, three U-boats attacked the convoy, and at 15:20 in 11°00′N 61°10′W, the British steamer SS Castle Harbour was hit on the starboard side by a torpedo and sank in less than two minutes. At almost the same time the United States steamer Winona, coal-laden, was struck forward on the starboard side. Later she limped into Trinidad. Soon afterwards, lookouts on Big Horn sighted a U-boat moving at periscope depth on the port beam, but in such a position that no action could be taken without damaging the United States troopship Mexico or the Egyptian ship Raz El Farog. At 16:27, lookouts on Big Horn again sighted a periscope and conning tower, on the port side, and her four-inch (100 mm) gun was trained in that direction just as a submarine chaser crossed through the line of fire and dropped five depth charges. Thereafter, the cruise in these waters was continued without incident for several days and Big Horn returned to NOB Trinidad about 29 October.

A second cruise in company with a convoy from Trinidad was begun by Big Horn on 1 November 1942, to a point nearly due north of Paramaribo, where the vessel left the convoy and proceeded on varying courses without incident until return to Trinidad on 8 November 1942.

On 10 November 1942, USS Big Horn sailed in convoy TAG-20, with the gunboat USS Erie (PG-50), two PC-boats (submarine chasers), and a PG-boat (patrol gunboat) acting as escorts. Because of submarine warnings, the convoy changed course so that the approach to Curaçao was made from the south and west. Because of engine difficulties, USS Big Horn dropped out of the convoy at 15:30 on 12 November 1942, in company with a Venezuelan tanker, and arrived at a point about 1.5 miles (2.4 km) off Willemstad harbor, where the Curaçao-Aruba subsidiary convoys were joining the main convoy. At 17:02, a great volume of smoke was sighted as it rose from Erie's stern, about 1,000 yards (910 m) on the starboard bow of Big Horn, at 12°07′N 68°58′W.

Erie had been torpedoed on the starboard side aft. Big Horn called General Quarters, increased speed to 11 knots (20 km/h) and proceeded for the scene of action, but repeated orders from Willemstad forced Big Horn to alter course at 17:25 and proceed to Willemstad. Erie swung into the wind; efforts to subdue the fire were unsuccessful. The gunboat was finally beached, officers and crew abandoning ship.

On 21 November 1942, USS Big Horn proceeded from Curaçao with a convoy bound for New York, The convoy proceeded on a course for Guantánamo with a Dutch gunboat and four SC-boats as escorts. Other vessels joined convoy at Guantánamo until on leaving that meeting point there were 45 ships and five escorts in company. The remainder of the cruise to New York via Caicos Passage was uneventful, and Big Horn anchored in The Narrows in New York Harbor at 20:40 on 1 December 1942. During the next few weeks, Big Horn entered the Todd Shipyard at Hoboken, New Jersey, for what proved to be nine weeks of repair work and alterations. The latter included the installation of a mousetrap, a Hedgehog depth charge projector, and a DF (direction finding) radio receiver.

1943

She departed New York on 17 February 1943, and arrived at New London, Connecticut, the following day. On 19 February 1942, Lieutenant Commander Farley assumed command of a newly organized Task Group consisting of Big Horn and three 173-foot (53 m) PC-boats: PC-560, PC-617, and PC-618. Antisubmarine measures had been so successful that no vessels had been sunk in coastal waters since July 1942. This Task Group was designed to hunt U-boats in the central Atlantic; the three PC-boats would escort Big Horn, which would act as bait and support in antisubmarine combat, as well as fuel and supply ship for the escorts.

During the period from 2 to 14 March, this Task Group conducted training exercises in Long Island Sound with the submarine Mingo (SS-261) supplied for the purpose by ComSubLant, During the next two weeks the Task Group made a shakedown cruise.

After a short trip to New York between 20 and 28 March, the Task Group continued antisubmarine training against Muskallunge (SS-262) until 9 April. Big Horn and the two subchasers then sailed south in Task Group 21.8 (TG 21.8) to New York, arriving there on 9 April.

Convoy UGS-7A sailed on the morning of 14 April 1943, and the special Task Group joined up off New York and continued in company until 08:00 on 21 April, when the Group left the convoy and dropped astern 25 nautical miles (46 kilometres), proceeding as straggler-with-escorts, although the escorts remained far enough astern so that they would not be visible to an enemy submarine sighting Big Horn. The cruise was uneventful during the next two weeks.

After several changes of course, Big Horn was at 29°00′N 28°10′W (about 500 miles (800 km) south of the Azores) at noon of 3 May 1943. Early that morning, Big Horn had made radar contact with a suspected U-boat at a range of about six miles (9.7 km) and sent the two PCs to investigate. At 11:04, PC-618 reported a submarine on the surface, distant about six miles (9.7 km). At 12:35, Big Horn got a sound contact and delivered a Hedgehog attack just after sighting a periscope on the starboard bow at 12:42, followed by a heavy swirl as the U-boat dove. At 13:33 a second attack was delivered and the contact was lost. At 15:40 the contact was regained at 3,700 yards (3.4 km) and at 15:54, speed five knots (9 km/h), Big Horn delivered a third attack. About five of the Hedgehog projectiles (which detonate only on contact) exploded about 12 seconds after they entered the water, and Big Horn continued in to drop depth charges. Considerable light oil came to the surface and continued to spread for two hours. At 01:03 on 4 May an oil patch was visible over an area of 200 to 300 yards (270 m). By daylight that morning, all traces of the oil slick were gone. As none of the vessels in the Group were able to establish contact during the next 44 hours, it was presumed that one submarine had been destroyed; that the other U-boat which had been sighted by the PC-618 had moved out of the area. A postwar review of German U-boat losses, however, indicated that no submarines were sunk on that date in this area.

Continuing on a homeward course, the commanding officer of Big Horn attempted to use the COMINCH (Commander in Chief, United States Fleet) daily submarine estimates as guides for fruitful changes of course, but after several attempts had failed to produce results, the Task Group Commander recorded in his log, on 13 May 1943:

This makes three submarines we have attempted to intercept on our return trip, all of which we theoretically should have met. This experience again accents the hopelessness of trying to find submarines. The proper procedure, as originally planned, is to remain in the vicinity of convoys, to which the submarines will come. On the next trip, it is planned to stay within about 15 miles [24 km], or less, of the convoy

After returning to New York on 17 May, the ship underwent another overhaul between 19 May and 16 July.

On her final cruise as a Q-ship, Big Horn again she served as the flagship of a small Task Group which included only two other vessels: PC-618 and PC-617. Commander L. C. Farley had relieved Captain Gainard as commanding officer of Big Horn on 24 June because of the illness of the latter. The Task Group departed New York on 20 July 1943, and proceeded to Norfolk, where convoy UGS-13 made up and sailed on the morning of 27 July. On 29 July, Big Horn straggled from the convoy and streamed her Mark 29 gear. For the next few days she trailed the convoy, distant about fifty miles (80 km). On 4 August, U-boats were reported by COMINCH to be operating in the vicinity of 38°N, 38°W, and the Task Group changed course to intercept. On 6 August, a submarine was sighted in 41°31′N 36°11′W and attacked by PC-618 with mousetraps which failed to explode. Thereafter the contact was not regained. An expanding box search was carried out during the next few days without results, then the group moved northward of the Azores. Planes from the escort aircraft carrier USS Card (CVE-11) were sighted several times during this period and it later transpired that some of these planes had made definite kills of U-boats during that period. Big Horn was not so fortunate, in spite of frequent changes of course to intercept submarines reported by COMINCH. The cruise continued in the general area and as far south as the latitude of Dakar, during the last weeks of August and throughout September. During the last week of September, a new search area was tried far to the north of the Azores, but again without success; then the homeward leg of the cruise was executed without event. Big Horn and her escorts stood up Ambrose Channel on 7 October 1943.

On 14 October, COMINCH directed that Big Horn should be retained in active service but that no alterations or extensive repairs should be made without specific authorization of COMINCH.

After training exercises in the New London area with a friendly sub from 29 October through 10 November, Big Horn made one more uneventful cruise in company with PC-617 and PC-618. On 11 November, the Task Group returned to New York to refuel and provision; on 15 November, the Task Group departed in company and proceeded on an eastward course until they had reached the hunting ground north of the Azores on 27 November. Searches were unsuccessful.

Big Horn then steamed back to New London on 30 November, whence she conducted training in Long Island Sound, before departing on a third "decoy" cruise on 19 December. Although she operated near a suspected U-boat concentration in the waters off Bermuda, the Q-ship and her two subchasers had no contacts and returned to New York empty-handed on 30 December.

In summarizing this cruise, the commanding officer of Big Horn wrote:

It may be noted that during the period from 27 November to 1 December, this Task Group was in the midst of a group of from 10 to 15 U-boats. Nine contacts, sightings or attacks on U-boats took place in our immediate vicinity, so that it is most unlikely that we were not seen by some U-boats. Evidently the U-boats are wary of attacking an independent tanker. If the Q-ship program has contributed to this wariness, as is suggested in several prisoner-of-war statements, many independent merchant ships may thereby have escaped attack, and the Q-ship program has thus been of value.

=== Coast Guard, 1944 ===
COMINCH did not agree, and, considering similarly meager results and even losses by other Q-ships, cancelled the entire Q-ship program. Big Horn was ordered to Boston, and arriving there on 17 January 1944, was transferred to the United States Coast Guard as USCGC Big Horn (WAO-124) to join Asterion (AK-100) on weather-patrol duty in the North Atlantic, under the supervision of the United States Coast Guard and crewed by Coast Guard officers and sailors. The ship was assigned to the 1st Naval District and operated out of Boston. Her main duty was to conduct 25-day patrols on the Coast Guard's mid-ocean weather stations and report on surface and aerial weather conditions. These reports were used to determine air-ferry routes across the Atlantic and to reroute shipping around storm concentrations. Because her antisubmarine equipment still remained intact, she could take offensive action if such opportunities presented themselves. Her name was struck from the Naval Vessel Register on 22 January 1944.

=== Pacific Fleet, 1945 ===
Although she kept her Coast Guard crew, Big Horn was returned to Navy control on 1 February 1945 and redesignated IX-207 two days later. Over the next five weeks, the ship was converted into an oil shuttle and storage vessel before departing for the Pacific on 11 March. After loading 84,000 barrels (13,400 m^{3}) of oil at Aruba, Netherlands West Indies, on the 18th, she passed through the Panama Canal on 21 March and reported to the Service Force, Pacific Fleet, that same day.

Steaming west, Big Horn stopped at Pearl Harbor in early April before sailing on to the Marshall Islands, where she anchored at Ulithi on 1 May. Assigned to Service Squadron 10 (ServRon 10), the shuttle tanker carried oil to Kossol Roads and Peleliu in the Western Carolines in early May before moving on to Tacloban in the Philippines later in the month. Returning to Ulithi on 3 June, she loaded more oil and delivered it to Leyte on the 9th. Over the next eight weeks, Big Horn carried out three more of these shuttle missions from Ulithi to Leyte. The tanker sailed to Okinawa on 11 August and she was at that island on 15 August 1945, when her crew heard the news of the Japanese surrender.

Departing Okinawa on 29 September, Big Horn steamed to Japan, where she was assigned duty as a station tanker at Nagoya on 3 October. She remained there through January 1946. After transferring her cargo of oil to Beagle (IX-112), the shuttle tanker got underway for home on 25 February. After a refueling stop at Pearl Harbor, she passed through the Panama Canal in early April and moored at Mobile, Alabama, on 15 April.

Big Horn then proceeded to New Orleans, Louisiana. She was decommissioned on 6 May 1946, and her name was struck from the Naval Vessel Register on 3 July 1946. Berthed at Orange, Texas, the ship was subsequently delivered to the Maritime Commission for disposal on 22 November 1946.

== Awards ==
- American Campaign Medal with two battle stars
- Asiatic-Pacific Campaign Medal
- World War II Victory Medal
- Navy Occupation Medal with "ASIA" clasp

== Bibliography ==
- Beyer, Edward F. & Beyer, Kenneth M. (1991). "U. S. Navy Mystery Ships". Warship International. XXVIII (4). International Naval Research Organization: 322–372. ISSN 0043-0374.
- Wright, David (1990). "Question 37/88". Warship International. XXVII (4): 422. ISSN 0043-0374.
