= USS Varuna (AGP-5) =

Motor torpedo boat tender during World War II

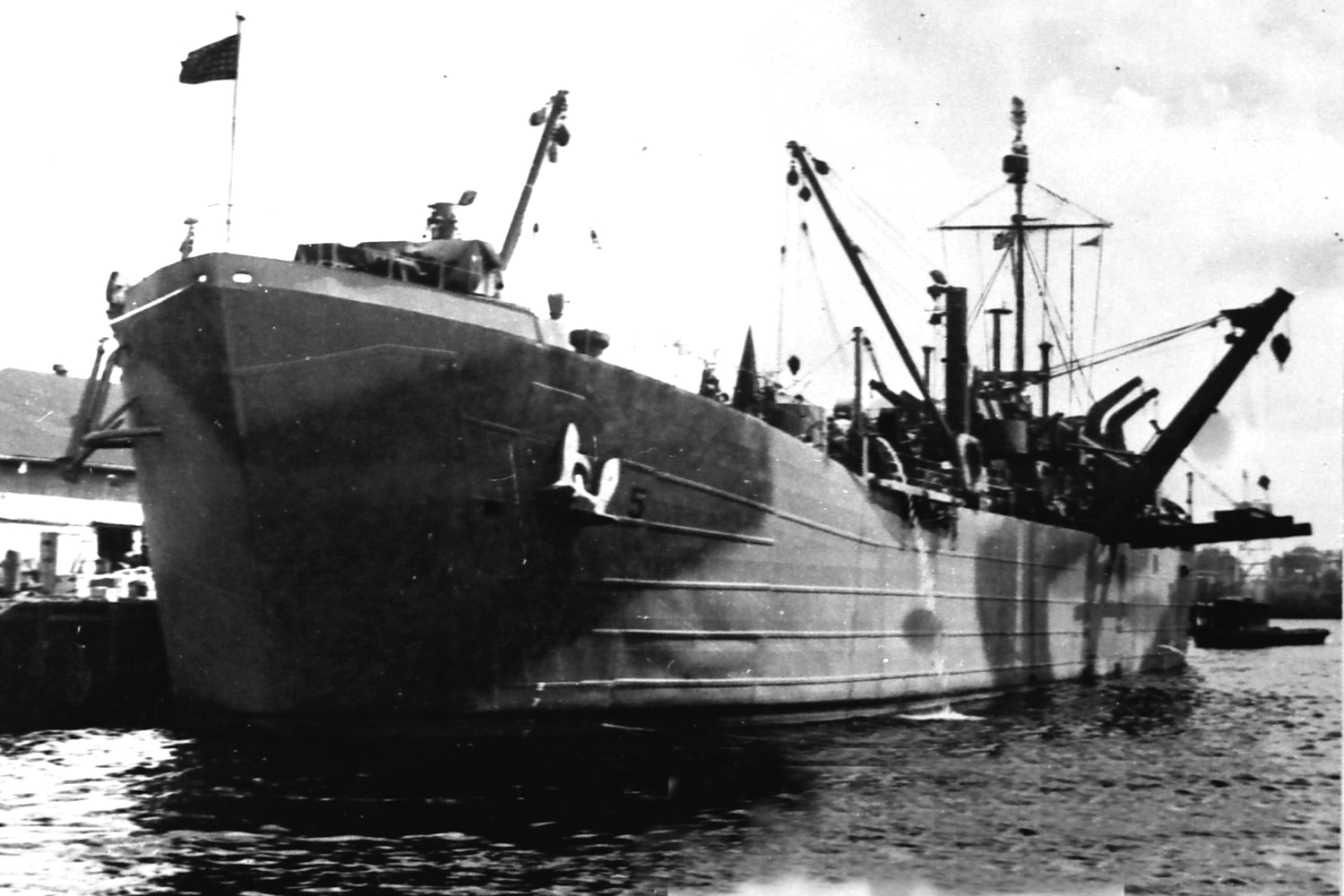
- Varuna, circa 1944

History

United States
- Name: USS Varuna
- Namesake: Varuna
- Builder: Dravo Corporation, Neville Island, Pennsylvania
- Laid down: 23 August 1942
- Launched: 9 December 1942
- Sponsored by: Mrs. R. J. Mitchell
- Completed: 26 March 1943
- Commissioned: 31 August 1943
- Decommissioned: 4 January 1946
- Renamed: Varuna (AGP-5), 13 January 1943
- Stricken: 1 May 1946
- Honors and awards: 4 battle stars (World War II)
- Fate: Sold for scrap 1946

General characteristics
- Class & type: Portunus-class motor torpedo boat tender
- Displacement: 3,960 long tons (4,024 t)
- Length: 328 ft (100 m)
- Beam: 50 ft (15 m)
- Draft: 13 ft 6 in (4.11 m)
- Propulsion: 2 × General Motors 12-567 diesel engines, 2 shafts, twin rudders
- Speed: 12 knots (22 km/h; 14 mph)
- Complement: 283 officers and enlisted
- Armament: 1 × 3"/50 caliber gun; 8 × 40 mm guns; 8 × 20 mm guns

USS Varuna (AGP-5) was a Portunus-class motor torpedo boat tender of the United States Navy during World War II.

The ship was laid down on 23 August 1942 by the Dravo Corporation at Neville Island, Pennsylvania as the LST-1-class tank landing ship LST-14. Launched on 9 December 1942, sponsored by Mrs. R. J. Mitchell, the ship was renamed Varuna and redesignated AGP-5 on 13 January 1943, and completed as an LST by Dravo Corp. on 26 March 1943. Placed in reduced commission on that date, she was towed to Tampa, Florida, where she was converted to a motor torpedo boat tender (AGP), and commissioned on 31 August 1943.

== Service history ==
=== 1943 ===
Following her shakedown in the Gulf of Mexico, Varuna sailed for the Pacific on 4 October and proceeded via Guantanamo Bay, Cuba, to the Panama Canal which she transited on the 22nd. When two days out of Balboa, the ship left the convoy to receive an emergency appendectomy patient from LST-219. Following a successful transfer, and while steaming to rejoin the convoy, Varuna and LST-219 collided on 27 October. There were no casualties on either ship, but the damage sustained forced both vessels to return to Panama for repairs.

Drydocked at Balboa from 9 to 20 November, Varuna got underway on 3 December for the Society Islands and arrived at Bora Bora on Christmas Eve. She remained there until the 28th, when she got underway on the second leg of her passage, and arrived at Pago Pago, Samoa, on 2 January 1944.

=== 1944 ===
Varuna did not linger long in Samoan waters, for she pushed toward Suva, Fiji Islands, on 5 January and then proceeded via Nouméa, New Caledonia, and Espiritu Santo, New Hebrides, to the Solomon Islands. She reached Lunga Point, Guadalcanal, on the 11th and then moved to Tulagi where she unloaded her cargo of motor torpedo boat (MTB) base equipment. Calling at Rendova Harbor, Rendova Island, and later at Blanche Harbor, Treasury Islands, Varuna conducted her first repair job on 17 February, when she repaired MTB (also known as patrol torpedo (PT) boat) PT-105. She remained at the Blanche Harbor base through the remainder of the month of February — repairing an average of four PT-boats per day — before she shifted her operations to Nissan Harbor, Green Island.

Establishing the PT-boat base at Green Island, Varuna was now situated at the base perhaps nearest to Japanese territory. Located half-way between New Ireland and Bougainville — both occupied by the Japanese and both well north of the nearest Allied bases — Green Island served as a staging area for the five MTB squadrons attached to Varuna. These PTs were earmarked to harass the Japanese seaborne supply lane from New Britain, New Ireland, and the Shortland Islands, and to assist in the blockade of Rabaul.

The ship's historian later recorded that it was while at Green Island that "Tokyo Rose" first mentioned Varuna. The vessel had been cut off from vital supplies while at Green Island and had been unable to get any more — or so said "Rose". Several days later, as the historian recounted, a PC came alongside to offer Varuna a share of her own meager stores. "The Varuna declined with thanks", the historian wrote, saying that "she had plenty of everything."

Varuna operated out of Green Island until 31 July, when she returned to the Treasury Islands for a 20-day stay. Returning to Green, she loaded men and equipment of Motor Torpedo Boat Squadron (MTBRon) 27, and departed her erstwhile base on the 24th, reaching Manus in the Admiralties two days later. Although initially slated to stage from there, a change of plan routed Varuna and her PT boats to Mios Woendi on the northern tip of New Guinea. Departing Manus on 7 September, the MTB tender and her brood — MTB-Rons 27 and 28 — arrived at Mios Woendi. on the 13th, via Humboldt Bay, New Guinea.

For the next 17 days, Varuna took on stores, fuel, water, and gasoline in preparation for her next operations and, in company with MTBRon 27, departed for the Palaus. Arriving in Naval Base Kossol Roads on 1 October, the MTB tender set up shop providing support services for the PT's which had been assigned the task of patrolling the large fleet anchorage there. In addition, the "Peter Tares" (PT's) were to patrol and blockade the Japanese-held island of Babelthuap and other small islands of the group.

Varuna received a "flash red" alert on the 30th at 0855; and, while other ships got underway, she received orders to remain at anchor to act as communication link for screening vessels and the PT's and to render assistance as necessary. At 1220, the ship picked up a single twin-engined Mitsubishi Ki-21 "Sally" coming in low and fast. It dropped one bomb near a floating drydock and roared on towards the anchored MTB tender. Varuna opened fire with 3-inch, 40-millimeter, and 20-millimeter guns, repelling the attack by enveloping the plane in tracer fire and causing the attacker to veer off in the direction of Babelthuap.

=== 1945 ===
Varuna remained at Kossol Roads until the day after Christmas 1944, when she sailed for San Pedro Bay, Leyte, arriving on 29 December. She remained in the bay until 25 January 1945, tending the boats from MTBRon 27 and repairing boats from other squadrons engaged in the local operations against the Japanese. In addition, towards the end of this period, Varuna staged for the invasion of Olongapo and Subic Bay on the island of Luzon.

She served in this support role in the capture of the Olongapo region, tending and repairing "Peter Tares". As American forces began their march to recapture Manila and the Bataan Peninsula, Varuna's boats blockaded the Bataan shoreline, serving a dual purpose in keeping reinforcements from coming in and those trapped Japanese from getting out; blockading Corregidor and Fort Drum in Manila Bay; and patrolling the bay. This action continued until late in April, with Varuna remaining in Subic Bay until 5 May.

Following a period of repairs which included a dry-docking, the MTB tender anchored off Samar to prepare for the impending strike against the Japanese-held island of Borneo. Departing Samar on 23 June, Varuna steamed singly for Tawi Tawi in the Sulu Archipelago, arriving on 26 June. She spent the following day fueling and making repairs to boats from MTBRons 10 and 27 before getting underway on the 28th.

Arriving off Balikpapan on 1 July, Varuna found that rough seas in Makassar Strait made docking of the PT's to be almost impossible. Allied forces meanwhile rapidly secured a beachhead, forcing the Japanese defenders into the hinterlands, and minesweeping operations cleared a channel to the inner harbor of Balikpapan. There, Varuna again set up shop to tend her group of torpedo boats. Up to this point, the Japanese had made little resistance from the air; but, late in July, the enemy began nearly continual air attacks for five days running. On one such attack, bombs splashed astern of Varuna but far enough away so as to not cause any damage.

Her boats, during this period, conducted regular patrols off the Borneo coast and across Makassar Strait to the Celebes. Varuna tended her brood, supporting their harassing activities to the enemy until 0237 on 15 August 1945, when word came to cease offensive action. Two atomic bombs and increased Allied pressures had forced Japan to accept the unconditional surrender terms of the Potsdam Declaration.

Varuna subsequently proceeded for Bobon Point, Samar, to assist in the decommissioning of PT boats. Arriving on 10 September, the MTB tender spent the next two months in the Philippines supporting this activity. On 20 November, she sailed for the United States and proceeded — via Guam, Pearl Harbor, and the Panama Canal — to New York City. Decommissioned on 4 January 1946, Varuna was struck from the Navy list on 1 May 1946 and sold to Stavanger Tankrederi for scrap soon thereafter.

== Awards ==
Varuna received four battle stars for her World War II services.

- American Campaign Medal
- World War II Victory Medal
- Asiatic-Pacific Campaign Medal (4)
- Philippines Presidential Unit Citation
- Philippines Liberation Medal
