= USS Amador =

Cargo ship of the United States Navy

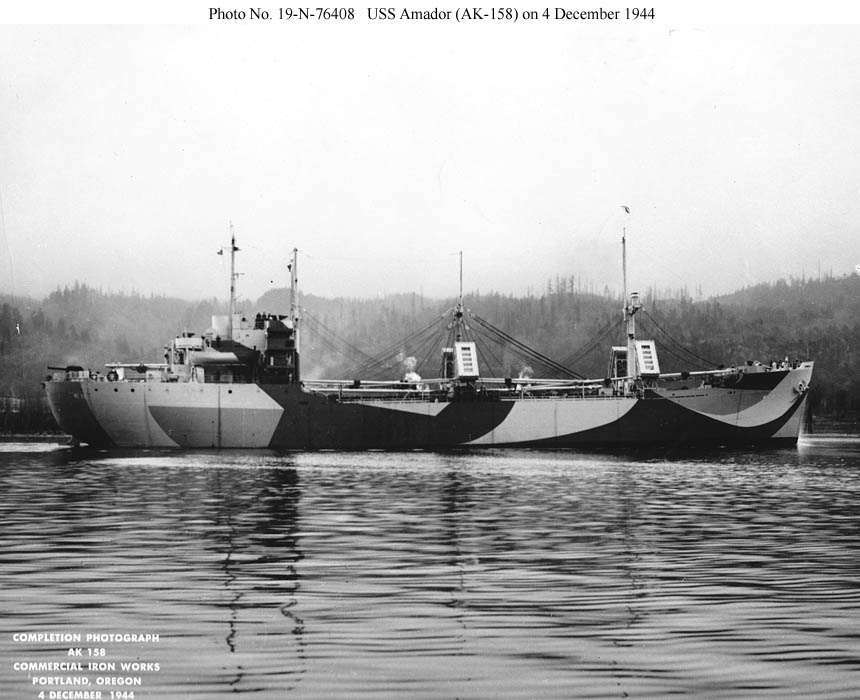
- USS Amador (AK-158) at anchor in the Columbia River, Oregon, December 1944.

History

United States
- Name: Amador
- Namesake: Amador County, California
- Ordered: as type (C1-M-AV1) hull, MC hull 2103
- Builder: Kaiser Shipyards Co., Richmond, California
- Yard number: 60
- Laid down: 27 December 1943
- Launched: 15 June 1944
- Sponsored by: Mrs. S. J. Davis
- Acquired: 10 August 1944
- Commissioned: 9 October 1944
- Decommissioned: 23 October 1944
- Recommissioned: 25 November 1944
- Decommissioned: 20 June 1946
- Refit: 23 October 1944, converted to ammunition tender
- Stricken: 19 July 1946
- Identification: Hull symbol: AK-158; Code letters: NEFJ
- Fate: Sold 23 March 1948, to Sudden & Christensen, Inc., agents for Rederacti Edolajet Signy

Sweden
- Name: Skagern
- Namesake: Skagern Lake
- Owner: Rederacti Edolajet Signy
- Acquired: 13 April 1948
- Fate: Sold 1963

Greece
- Name: Nicoloas; Dina; Alkistis
- Acquired: 1963
- Identification: IMO number: 5407370
- Fate: Scrapped in Spain in 1980

General characteristics
- Class & type: Alamosa-class cargo ship
- Type: C1-M-AV1
- Tonnage: 5,032 long tons deadweight (DWT)
- Displacement: 2,382 long tons (2,420 t) (standard); 7,450 long tons (7,570 t) (full load)
- Length: 388 ft 8 in (118.47 m)
- Beam: 50 ft (15 m)
- Draft: 21 ft 1 in (6.43 m)
- Installed power: 1 × Nordberg, TSM 6 diesel engine; 1,750 shp (1,300 kW)
- Propulsion: 1 × propeller
- Speed: 11.5 kn (21.3 km/h; 13.2 mph)
- Capacity: 3,945 t (3,883 long tons) DWT; 9,830 cu ft (278 m^{3}) (refrigerated); 227,730 cu ft (6,449 m^{3}) (non-refrigerated)
- Complement: 15 Officers; 70 Enlisted
- Armament: 1 × 3 in (76 mm)/50 caliber dual purpose gun (DP); 6 × 20 mm (0.8 in) Oerlikon anti-aircraft (AA) cannons

USS Amador (AK-158) was an Alamosa-class cargo ship commissioned by the US Navy for service in World War II. She was responsible for delivering troops, goods and equipment to locations in the war zone.

== Service history ==
Amador was laid down under a Maritime Commission contract, MC hull 2103, on 27 December 1943, at Richmond, California, by Kaiser Cargo Inc.; launched on 15 June 1944; sponsored by Mrs. S. J. Davis; acquired by the Navy on 10 August 1944; commissioned on 9 October 1944, decommissioned at Portland, Oregon, on 23 October 1944 to undergo conversion to an ammunition tender by the Commercial Iron Works, and recommissioned on 25 November 1944. Amador got underway early in December for shakedown training off San Pedro, California. She loaded cargo and ammunition at the Mare Island Navy Yard, Vallejo, California, then sailed for Eniwetok on 11 January 1945. The ship reached Eniwetok on the 29th and was routed on to Ulithi. Upon her arrival there on 18 February, Amador was assigned to Service Squadron 10.

Amador remained at Ulithi through 15 March for ammunition handling operations. She next set sail on the 16th for Leyte, Philippines, via Kossol Roads. The ship anchored in Leyte-Samar Naval Base's San Pedro Bay on 22 March and began issuing ammunition to ships of the fleet, as well as reworking defective projectiles and fuses. On 23 October, she moved to Guinan Roadstead, Samar, and began receiving ammunition from ammunition lighters for transportation back to the United States. On 12 November, Amador got underway for Seattle, Washington. She arrived in Puget Sound on 8 December and remained in that area until 29 March 1946, when she began preparations for deactivation. She was decommissioned on 20 June 1946, and her name was struck from the Navy list on 19 July 1946. The ship was transferred to the Maritime Commission on 23 July 1946. She was subsequently sold and fitted out for service as a merchant ship.

== Bibliography ==
- "Amador". Dictionary of American Naval Fighting Ships. Naval History and Heritage Command. 16 June 2015.
- "C1 Cargo Ships". ShipbuildingHistory.com. 28 August 2009.
- "USS Amador (AK-158)". NavSource. 11 July 2015.
