= USS Lovelace =

Buckley-class destroyer escort

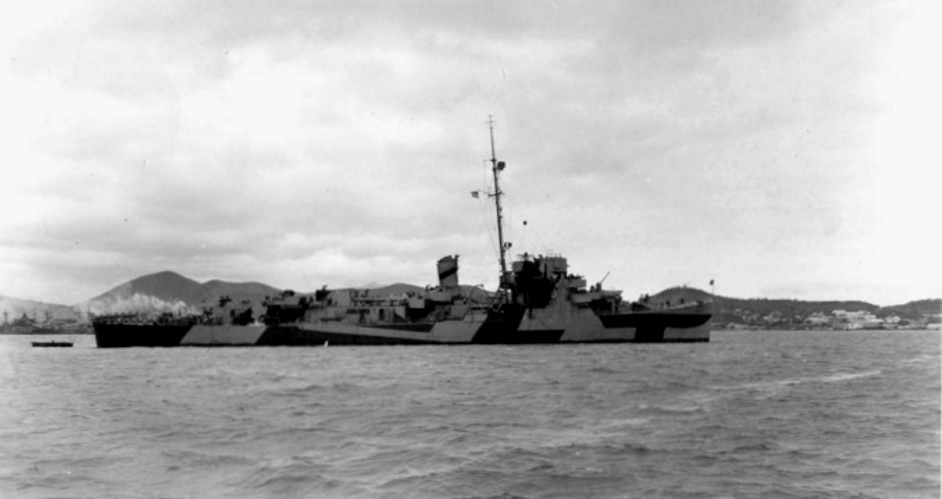

History

United States
- Name: USS Lovelace
- Namesake: Lovelace
- Builder: Norfolk Navy Yard, Portsmouth, Virginia
- Laid down: 22 May 1943
- Launched: 4 July 1943
- Commissioned: 7 November 1943
- Decommissioned: 22 May 1946
- Stricken: 1 July 1967
- Honors and awards: 3 battle stars (World War II)
- Fate: Sunk as target off California, 25 April 1968

General characteristics
- Class & type: Buckley-class destroyer escort
- Displacement: 1,400 long tons (1,422 t)
- Length: 306 ft (93 m)
- Beam: 26 ft 9 in (8.15 m)
- Draft: 13 ft 6 in (4.11 m)
- Speed: 24 knots (44 km/h; 28 mph)
- Range: 4,940 nmi (9,150 km)
- Complement: 213 officers and enlisted
- Armament: 3 × single Mk.22 3"/50 caliber guns; 1 × quad Mk.2 1.1"/75 caliber gun; 8 × single 20 mm Mk.4 AA guns; 1 × triple 21 in (533 mm) Mk.15 torpedo tubes; 1 × Hedgehog Mk.10 anti-submarine mortar (144 rounds); 8 × Mk.6 K-gun depth charge projectors; 2 × Mk.9 depth charge tracks

USS Lovelace (DE-198) was a Buckley-class destroyer escort in the United States Navy. She was named for naval aviator Donald Alexander Lovelace (1906–1942).

Lovelace was laid down on 22 May 1943; launched on 4 July 1943 by Norfolk Navy Yard, Portsmouth, Virginia; sponsored by Mrs. Donald A. Lovelace, widow; and commissioned on 7 November 1943.

== Service history ==
After shakedown, Lovelace departed Norfolk on 2 January 1944 never to return to the east coast of the United States. This flagship of Destroyer Escort Division 37 picked up convoys at Guantanamo, the Panama Canal Zone, and the Society Islands as she steamed across the southern Pacific to Nouméa, New Caledonia, arriving on 8 February.

Escort and screening duties in the Solomon Islands preceded her departure on 19 April for the New Guinea battle zone. Arriving off Hollandia (now Jayapura, Indonesia) without incident on 24 April, she screened the debarking of the second wave of relief troops. Later Lovelace interrupted her New Guinea coastal patrol and escort missions on 8 July to bombard beach targets at Toem and on 22 July entered a floating drydock at Milne Bay. A more important cessation from an almost continuous sailing schedule occurred a month later at New Caledonia, where new 20 mm guns were installed.

Lovelace left the Melanesian groups on 15 October sailing northwest to the Kossol Straits, Palau Islands, and then westward to Leyte Gulf. She arrived on 25 October just as a major naval battle was beginning some sixty miles away. While protecting 7th Fleet replenishment units, she splashed her first enemy plane on 26 October. Six days later en route to Kossol Straits the screen was heavily attacked by suicide planes, but the convoy fought through. On 21 November Lovelace was credited with an assist in downing an enemy bomber attacking its Hollandia-bound convoy.

After a period of refresher antisubmarine training off Sansapoor, New Guinea, the destroyer escort joined TF 78 en route to the Philippines. Lovelace continued to operate primarily as an intra-Philippine escort vessel from 8 January 1945 until mid-July. However, during this period her anti-aircraft capabilities were increased by the installation of air-search radar at Manus in the Admiralties. In July her zone of operations expanded to include Ulithi, and on 9 August, in the lull between air attacks, she first closed Okinawa. When she returned in September, it was the weather rather than the Japanese that posed the threat. Only slightly damaged herself on 19 September, she went to the assistance of the Colbert (APA-145), an attack transport loaded with liberated U.S. war prisoners, after the ship had hit a drifting mine. After seeing the troopship safely back to Buckner Bay, Lovelace returned to the Philippines; and on 1 October the ship departed Subic Bay for the United States in company with the ships of Escort Division 37.

Arriving in San Diego, California on 23 October, Lovelace reached the end of twenty-one active months of naval service. Decommissioned on 22 May 1946, she was berthed at Bremerton, Washington, and struck on 1 July 1967. Lovelace performed her last duty for the Navy by acting as a target for destruction on 25 April 1968.

== Awards ==
Lovelace was awarded three battle stars for World War II service.
