= USS Kishwaukee =

Patapsco-class gasoline tanker

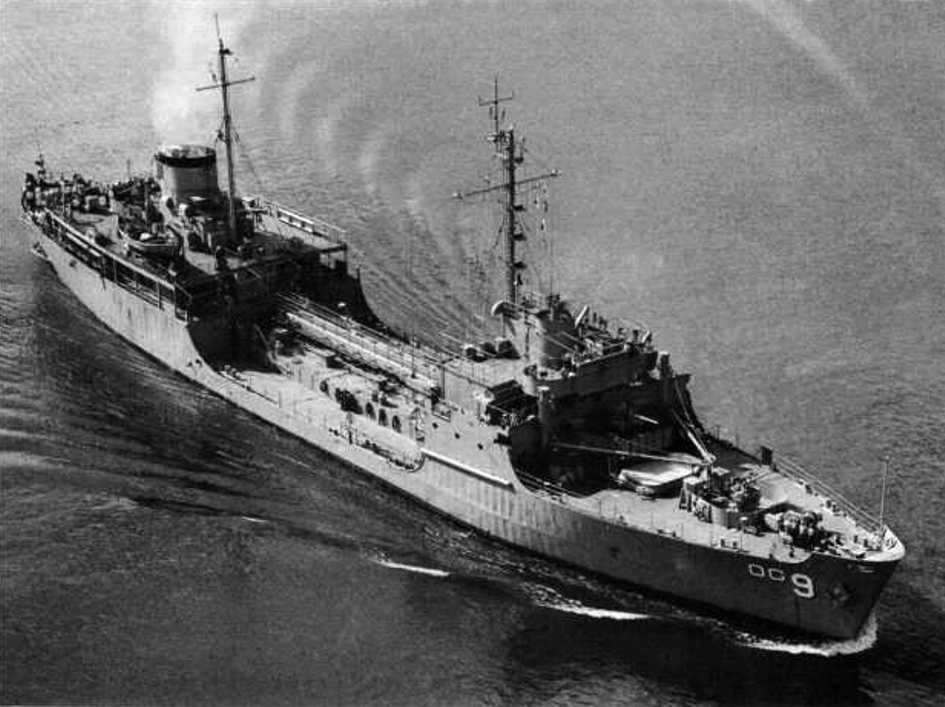

History

United States
- Name: USS Kishwaukee
- Namesake: Kishwaukee River in Illinois
- Laid down: 22 September 1942
- Launched: 24 July 1943
- Commissioned: 27 May 1944
- Decommissioned: 2 April 1958
- Stricken: 1 July 1960
- Recommissioned: 1 September 1966
- Decommissioned: 15 January 1970
- Stricken: 1 August 1974
- Fate: Sold for commercial service; 18 December 1978

General characteristics
- Class & type: Patapsco-class gasoline tanker
- Tonnage: 2,210 long tons deadweight (DWT)
- Displacement: 1,850 long tons (1,880 t) light; 4,130 long tons (4,196 t) full load
- Length: 310 ft 9 in (94.72 m)
- Beam: 48 ft 6 in (14.78 m)
- Draft: 15 ft 8 in (4.78 m)
- Propulsion: 4 × General Electric diesel-electric engines, twin shafts, 3,300 hp (2,461 kW)
- Speed: 15.5 knots (17.8 mph; 28.7 km/h)
- Complement: 131
- Armament: 4 × 3"/50 caliber guns; 12 × 20 mm AA

Service record
- Operations: World War II, Korean War, Vietnam War
- Awards: 2 battle stars (World War II); 7 campaign stars (Vietnam)

USS Kishwaukee (AOG-9) was a Patapsco-class gasoline tanker acquired by the U.S. Navy for the task of transporting gasoline to warships in the fleet, and to remote Navy stations.

Kishwaukee had the distinction of being one of the few ships serving in World War II, the Korean War, and the Vietnam War, and returned home with battle and campaign stars to their credit.

Kishwaukee was launched 24 July 1943, by Cargill Shipyard, Savage, Minnesota; sponsored by Mrs. John Shipp; and commissioned 27 May 1944.

== World War II service ==
After shakedown, Kishwaukee cleared Norfolk, Virginia, 8 July 1944, and joined the Service Squadron at Pearl Harbor 10 August. She completed a two-month shuttle among the central Pacific islands before sailing west to support the reconquest of the Philippine Islands. Kishwaukee arrived off Leyte late in October and operated as station tanker, fueling ships in the vicinity. She supported the Philippine campaign until she sailed 1 February 1945, for operations in the Palau and Caroline Islands.

=== Supporting the fleet at Okinawa ===
Late in March, as the war moved closer to Japan, Kishwaukee sailed for the Ryukyus to fuel ships engaged in the invasion of Okinawa. In spite of the constant enemy air raids, the oiler remained as station tanker until after Okinawa had been secured and continued servicing Allied ships in Okinawa until sailing for Japan, arriving Sasebo 22 December. Following six months as station tanker in the Far East, Kishwaukee cleared Japan 5 July and put into San Pedro, California, 31 July.

== Post-war operations ==
From 1946 to 1950 Kishwaukee remained on active service with the U.S. Pacific Fleet. Based at Pearl Harbor she alternated tours in the Far East with cruises among the islands off the South and Central Pacific.

== Korean War service ==
During the Korean War, she supplied vital fuel to Pacific Ocean staging areas and operated as a station ship out of Sasebo November through December 1950. Upon cessation of Korean hostilities, Kishwaukee resumed fuel shuttles from Pearl Harbor to the Pacific Islands and Alaska.

== Post-Korean War activity ==
During 1954 the oiler unloaded cargo in French Indochina as the war in that country was nearing an end. That August she sailed to Formosa with a supply of aviation gasoline in anticipation of a possible Red Chinese attack on Nationalist held islands in the Formosa Straits. Kishwaukee returned Pearl Harbor 17 October and for the next three years continued runs between Hawaii and the Marshall Islands before sailing for the U.S. West Coast 10 November 1957. She arrived Astoria, Oregon, 11 December and decommissioned at Seattle, Washington, 2 April 1958. Her name was struck from the Navy List 1 July 1960. Kishwaukee remained with the Maritime Administration Reserve Fleet until October 1965, when her name reappeared on the Navy List.

== Reactivated during the Vietnam War ==
The ship underwent extensive overhaul at the Swan Island Shipyard in Portland, Oregon, and recommissioned 1 September 1966. After fitting out, Kishwaukee arrived Pearl Harbor, her homeport, 7 October 1966. Following shakedown training, she sailed to the Far East 5 December and arrived, via Guam, at Subic Bay 22 December. The gasoline tanker entered the combat zone the last day of the year and supplied fuel for naval aircraft for strikes against targets ashore. From 2 January 1967 into April she operated out of Da Nang, South Vietnam, before departing for Yokosuka, Japan, arriving 30 April. Kishwaukee continued on to Pearl Harbor and joined ServRon 5 after her arrival 15 May.

== End-of-service activity ==
Kishwaukee was decommissioned on 15 January 1970 at Naval Station Pearl Harbor, Hawaii, and laid up at INACTSHIPMAINTFAC West Lock, Pearl Harbor. On 1 August 1974, she was struck from the Naval Register. Kishwaukee was disposed of by MARAD sale, 12 December 1978 to Mid Pacific Sea Harvesters, LTD for $56,480, for conversion to a fishing vessel. Kishwaukee was converted to the fishing vessel Vicky Rae, serving as such until 1997 when she was scrapped in Shanghai, China.

== Military awards and honors ==
Kishwaukee received two battle stars for World War II service:

- Leyte operation
- Okinawa Gunto operation

During the Vietnam War, she was awarded seven campaign stars:

- Vietnamese Counteroffensive - Phase II
- Vietnamese Counteroffensive - Phase III
- Tet Counteroffensive
- Vietnamese Counteroffensive - Phase IV
- Vietnamese Counteroffensive - Phase VI
- Tet/69 Counteroffensive
- Vietnamese Summer-Fall 1969

Kishwaukee’s crew was eligible for the following citations, medals and ribbons (shown in order of precedence):

- Combat Action Ribbon (retroactive, Okinawa 1945, Danang 1969)
- China Service Medal (extended)
- American Campaign Medal
- Asiatic-Pacific Campaign Medal (2)
- World War II Victory Medal
- Navy Occupation Service Medal (with Asia clasp)
- National Defense Service Medal (2)
- Korean Service Medal
- Vietnam Service Medal (7)
- Republic of Vietnam Meritorious Gallantry Cross Unit Citation
- Republic of Vietnam Civil Action Unit Citation
- Philippines Liberation Medal
- United Nations Service Medal
- Republic of Vietnam Campaign Medal
- Republic of Korea War Service Medal (retroactive)
