= Kossol Roads =

Body of reef-enclosed water in Palau

Kossol Roads is a large body of reef-enclosed water north of Babeldaob in northern Palau at 07°48′N 134°36′E.

Kossol Roads is also known as: Kossol Passage, Kawassak, Garaseg, Kanal von Kossol, Kossol Durchfahrt, Kossoi Passage, Kosusoru-suido, Toachel Ngkesol, Kawassak, and Ngkesol.

At the outbreak of World War II, Kossol Roads was under Japanese control. American forces seized it in September 1944, after which the United States Navy used it as the location of a floating resupply and repair base and waypoint for convoys at Naval Base Kossol Roads.
