= USS Chepachet =

Oiler of the United States Navy

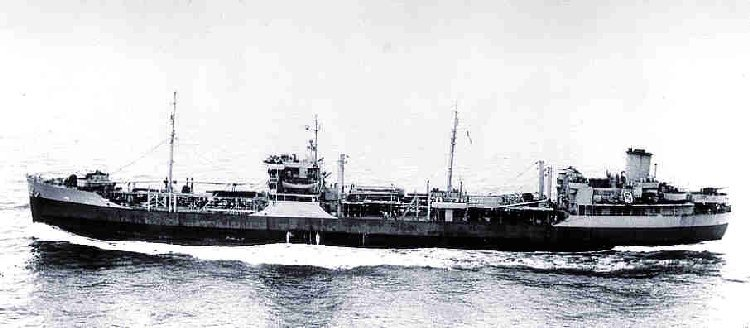
- USS Chepachet

History

United States
- Name: USS Chepachet
- Namesake: Chepachet River in Rhode Island
- Builder: Sun Shipbuilding & Drydock Co., Chester, Pennsylvania
- Laid down: 1 November 1942
- Launched: 10 March 1943
- Commissioned: 27 April 1943
- Decommissioned: 15 May 1946
- Stricken: 4 January 1980
- Identification: IMO number: 7939016
- Honors and awards: 2 battle stars (World War II)
- Fate: Transferred to MARAD for disposal, 1980

General characteristics
- Type: Suamico-class fleet replenishment oiler
- Displacement: 5,782 long tons (5,875 t) light; 21,880 long tons (22,231 t) full
- Length: 523 ft 6 in (159.56 m)
- Beam: 68 ft (21 m)
- Draft: 30 ft (9.1 m)
- Propulsion: Turbo-electric, single screw, 8,000 hp (5,966 kW)
- Speed: 15.5 knots (28.7 km/h; 17.8 mph)
- Boats & landing craft carried: 2
- Capacity: 140,000 barrels (22,000 m^{3})
- Complement: 232 to 251
- Armament: 1 × 5"/38 caliber gun; 4 × 3"/50 caliber guns; 4 × twin 40 mm AA guns; 4 × twin 20 mm AA guns

USS Chepachet (AO-78), originally named SS Eutaw Springs, and later known as USNS Chepachet (T-AOT-78) until disposition, was a Suamico-class fleet oiler, of the T2-SE-A1 tanker hull type, serving in the United States Navy during World War II. Originally a namesake of the Battle of Eutaw Springs when laid down 1 November 1942, she was renamed for the Chepachet River located in a village of Glocester, Rhode Island bearing the same name.

== Service history ==
=== Launch and commission ===
Chepachet was launched on 10 March 1943 after being built at Sun Shipbuilding & Dry Dock Co., Chester, Pennsylvania, under Maritime Commission contract MC 340 as hull number 278 and USMC number 353. Sponsored by Mrs. I.G. Klemmer, the ship was commissioned by the US Navy on 27 April 1943 and reported to the US Atlantic Fleet.

=== Initial service ===
Between 27 July 1943 and 19 June 1944, Chepachet supported military and naval operations in North Africa and the Mediterranean by crossing the Atlantic in convoys, carrying oil from West Indian and Gulf ports to Casablanca and Oran. In July, Chepachet took departure for Aruba, NWI, a Dutch island off the coast of Venezuela, and a transshipment and refining center for Venezuelan crude oil, in company with the oiler Salamonie (AO-26), and the destroyer escorts Walter C. Wann (DE-412) and Abercrombie (DE-343). Abercrombie and Walter C. Wann shepherded the two oilers into port at Aruba late in the evening on 15 July 1944. Two days later after the oilers loaded cargo, the convoy put to sea again, laden with oil, and on 17 August reached Humboldt Bay, New Guinea, for duty fueling combatant ships, small craft, and merchantmen at the Panama Canal.

=== Liberation of the Philippines ===
Assigned a key support role in the invasion of the Philippines, Chepachet was part of Task Unit (TU) 77.7.1 which included the oilers Ashtabula (AO-51), Saranac (AO-74), and Salamonie (AO-26), the ammunition ship Mazama (AE-9), and the merchant ship SS Pueblo. The TU was joined on 12 October by the destroyer escorts Willmarth (DE-638) and Whitehurst (DE-634) (out of Blanche Harbor), steering for Kossol Roads and final preparations for assault. Other escorts were Witter (DE-636) and Bowers (DE-637).

Chepachet traveled with TU 77.7.1 until released late on 13 October under Willmarth's escort, with Pueblo, to Kossol Passage, in the Palaus, arriving there at 18:21 on 14 October. Willmarth patrolled for three days before getting underway with Chepachet again during the forenoon on 20 October, screening sortie for the Philippines, also including Ashtabula, Saranac, Salamonie, Mazama, and SS Durham Victory.

The TU convoy proceeded north, while American troops splashed ashore on the beaches of Leyte to commence the liberation of the Philippines. Chepachet arrived in Leyte Gulf on 23 October, three days after the main landing began, the destroyer escort anchored off Leyte midway between the northern and southern transport areas while Chepachet and fellow oilers brought vital assistance to the ships from Task Group (TG) 77.2 which fought the Japanese to a decisive victory in the Battle for Leyte Gulf (23–26 October). During the fury of the days that followed, Chepachet transferred fuel to 34 different ships, some of them several times, as her men manned anti-aircraft guns as well as fueling lines.

On the evening of the 23rd, around 18:25, steaming eastward toward a night anchorage, Chepachet's destroyer escort observed anti-aircraft fire over the northern transport area. Underway again off Homonhon Island early the next morning, the destroyer escort received a report of enemy aircraft orbiting over the northern transport area. As she steamed along the convoy's flank, the escort commenced making black smoke at 08:44 to lay a protective screen in anticipation of the enemy's arrival. While the radio crackled with reports of ships under attack, no enemy planes were spotted nearby, only many puffs of "flak" splattering the skies to the westward of the refueling group. With the receipt of a "flash white" at 13:43, the oilers resumed refueling TG 77.2. Willmarth shifted to Samar Island shortly before 17:00 before going to general quarters at 17:06 upon receipt of a "flash red." After waiting for well over an hour for the enemy to make an appearance, the convoy stopped and prepared to anchor for the night.

At 18:43, however, three "Jills" roared in low from the east, torpedoes slung menacingly beneath their bellies. Willmarth's guns opened fire on two just before they released their "fish." One torpedo holed Ashtabula and forced her to a halt, dead in the water. While the oiler's repair parties controlled the flooding and patched the hole, the convoy passed out of Leyte Gulf and reformed in the wake of the attack. Eventually, Ashtabula, repairs effected, rejoined at 22:30.

The convoy remained underway throughout the evening, maneuvering on various courses and speeds in Leyte Gulf until the first rays of sunlight streaked the eastern skies. After going to general quarters at 04:58, the destroyer escort remained at battle stations throughout the day. Less than an hour after her crew first closed up at action stations, two "Jills" attacked the convoy from the westward. Willmarth immediately opened fire with her 3-inch (76 mm) and 1.1-inch (28 mm) batteries. As one "Jill" roared across the stern of the convoy, it was caught by gunfire from Willmarth and other ships of the convoy and crashed in flames far astern.

While maneuvering and making smoke to mask the convoy, the destroyer escort spotted a floating mine which she sank with gunfire. Soon thereafter, another "Jill" passed through the area and drew fire from Willmarth. Unfortunately, the shells were not observed to hit; and the plane escaped.

The convoy anchored in the fueling area at 11:52, three hours after the last attack. Willmarth and the other escorts screened the convoy and provided an anti-submarine screen patrol around the valuable auxiliaries. Later that afternoon, Willmarth repulsed an attack made by a lone plane which came out of the sun in a glide-bombing attack at 14:20. The destroyer escort's gunfire damaged the plane and caused it to spin into the water about five miles (8 km) away.

The convoy departed the fueling area at 16:46. Frequent alerts and enemy planes enlivened the evening hours as the group maneuvered throughout the night in a retirement formation. Willmarth's war diarist noted that the Japanese planes seemed loath to attack ships in the fueling area during daylight, probably because of the heavy concentration of anti-aircraft fire that could be directed at an attacker.

The next day, 26 October, saw a repetition of the same routine that had kept the destroyer escort active since her arrival in Leyte Gulf three days earlier. After maneuvering on screening duties through the night, the warship spotted a lone "Val" dive bomber making an attack at 05:50; Willmarth opened fire from 6,000 yards (5,500 m) but failed to score any hits. Within minutes, she and her sister escorts were laying smoke screens to cover the convoy for the next hour. Thereafter, they provided anti-submarine screening protection while the oilers conducted fueling operations.

After following the same routine on the 27th, Willmarth departed Leyte Gulf and headed for the Palaus. At 08:00 on 28 October, Willmarth – escorting the oilers earmarked to refuel the 7th Fleet ships – rendezvoused with the carriers of Task Group 77.4 and screened the refuelling operations for the balance of the day. Detached that afternoon, Willmarth screened Ashtabula and Chepachet as they voyaged to Kossol Roads, in the Palaus. Arriving on 30 October, Chepachet reloaded until 4 November, and returned to Leyte Gulf with her badly needed cargo to conduct fueling operations from 7 to 10 November.

=== Later wartime service ===
Between 14 November 1944, when she returned to New Guinea, and 27 December, when she sailed for the Philippines, Chepachet served at various South Pacific ports as station oiler, receiving oil brought in by naval and merchant tankers, and transferring it to combatants. Arriving at Mindoro, PI, on 8 January 1945, Chepachet sailed on to fueling operations in Lingayen Gulf on 11 January, when she aided those ships which had just carried out the successful assaults there. On 15 January she reported at newly won San Fabian for station tanker duty, which continued there and at Mindanao until 4 June. The oiler then put to sea for the Borneo operation, sailing to Tawi Tawi for staging. From 21 to 25 June Chepachet was at sea under escort of Leland E. Thomas (DE-420) fueling the bombardment group which carried out an intensive preparatory pounding at Balikpapan, Borneo and on 30 June, the oiler returned to Balikpapan for the assault the next day. She remained off the Borneo coast until 19 July, supporting the assault and occupation. Chepachet returned to Subic Bay for operations in the Luzon area, for example, rendezvous with a fast carrier task group at the end of August under escort of Walton (DE-361). Chepachet followed the Subic Bay movements until the close of the war.

=== Closing of the war ===
Chepachet aided in occupation and redeployment operations throughout the Far East with station duty at Jinsen, Korea; Hong Kong; Okinawa; and Tokyo until 9 December, when she sailed for Pearl Harbor. She returned to Yokohama on 29 January 1946, offloaded her cargo, and sailed for home on 4 February. Arriving at San Francisco on 21 February, Chepachet was decommissioned on 15 May.

Chepachet earned two battle stars for World War II service.

=== Disposition ===
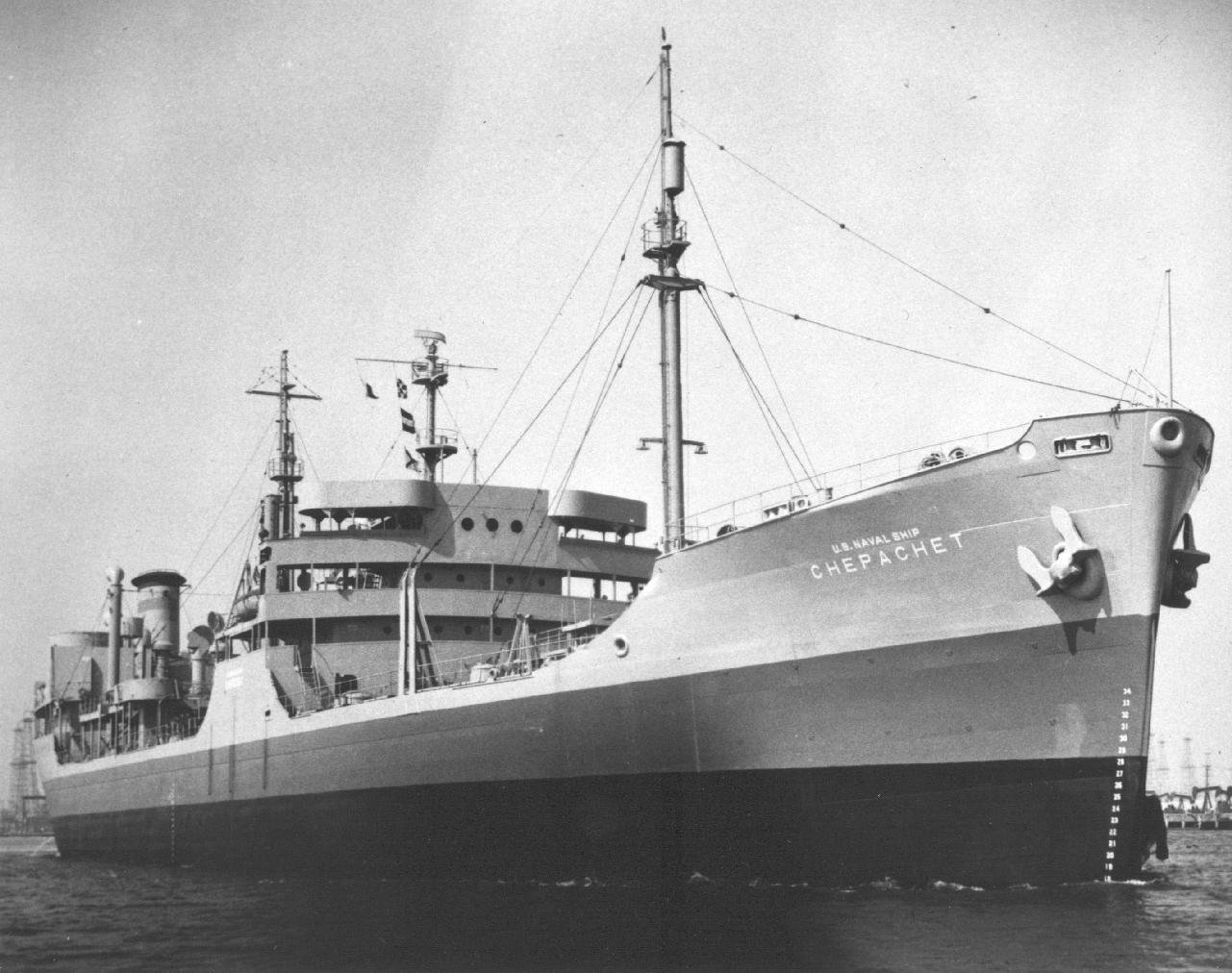
USNS Chepachet

Retitled USNS Chepachet, she was transferred to the Military Sea Transportation Service for service in a noncommissioned status, reclassified as a transport oiler, and manned by a contract civilian marine crew. The vessel was placed out-of-service in July 1950, struck from the Naval Register on 4 January 1980 and transferred to the Maritime Administration for disposal.

At that time Global Marine Development won a contract from the Department of Energy to build a research vessel for Ocean Thermal Energy Conversion. They chose the USNS Chepachet because her electric drive could be used to run the pumps and equipment necessary for the project. When repairs and modifications were completed she was renamed the "SS Ocean Energy Converter" and dedicated in Hawaii on 5 July 1980. She had a successful deployment ending in April 1981, but due to funding cuts she was unable to be deployed again. In February 1982 she was transferred to the state of Hawaii to be sold for scrap with the proceeds and useful equipment going to an onshore OTEC research facility.

Around 1998, former crewmembers finally located the village their vessel was named for, and held a reunion in Chepachet, Rhode Island, documented in an article in The Providence Journal dated 20 September of that year.
