= SS Durham Victory =

Victory ship of the United States

- Typical Victory Ship.

History

United States
- Name: SS Durham Victory
- Namesake: Durham, North Carolina
- Owner: War Shipping Administration
- Operator: Agwilines Inc
- Builder: California Shipbuilding Company, Los Angeles
- Laid down: March 30, 1944
- Launched: March 30, 1944
- Completed: July 5, 1944
- Fate: Sold to the Netherlands, 1946

Netherlands
- Name: SS Averdijk
- Owner: Holland America Line
- Operator: Holland America Line
- Fate: Sold to Panama, 1967

Panama
- Name: SS Domina
- Owner: Consolidated Mariner S.A, Panama
- Fate: Scrapped in Taiwan, 1972

General characteristics
- Class & type: VC2-S-AP3 Victory ship
- Tonnage: 7612 GRT, 4,553 NRT
- Displacement: 15,200 tons
- Length: 455 ft (139 m)
- Beam: 62 ft (19 m)
- Draft: 28 ft (8.5 m)
- Installed power: 8,500 shp (6,300 kW)
- Propulsion: HP & LP turbines geared to a single 20.5-foot (6.2 m) propeller, by Westinghouse Electric & Mfg. Co., Essington
- Speed: 16.5 knots
- Boats & landing craft carried: 4 Lifeboats
- Complement: 62 Merchant Marine and 28 US Naval Armed Guards
- Armament: 1 × 5 inch (127 mm)/38 caliber gun as Victory ship; 1 × 3 inch (76 mm)/50 caliber gun; 8 × 20 mm Oerlikon

The SS Durham Victory was the 19th Victory ship built during World War II under the Emergency Shipbuilding program. The SS Durham Victory was launched by the California Shipbuilding Company on March 30, 1944, and completed on July 5, 1944. The ship’s United States Maritime Commission designation was VC2-S-AP3, hull number 18 (V-19). SS Durham Victory served in the Pacific Ocean during World War II and was operated by Agwilines Inc.

== Victory ships ==
The 10,500-ton Victory ships were designed to replace the earlier Liberty ships that were used only for WW2. Compared to the Liberty ships, the Victory ships were much faster, significantly larger, and designed to last longer to serve the US Navy after the war. Victory ships also had a thinner stack set farther toward the superstructure, and a long, raised forecastle. Many ships like the SS Durham Victory were sold.

== Christening ==
SS Durham Victory was christened prior to her first launch at the shipyard of the California Shipbuilding Corporation, also known as CalShip, in Wilmington, Los Angeles. The ship was a one of a total 550 Victory Ships, of which Calship delivered 132. Each ship was named after an American city. The SS Durham Victory was commissioned into battle during World War II at the Battle of Leyte from June 1944 to January 1945.

== World War II ==
SS Durham Victory steamed into the Pacific to bring supplies to the Pacific War troops. She had the dangerous job of transporting 6,000 pounds of ammunition for the Liberation of The Philippines and the Battle of Leyte from April 1 until April 6, 1945. The SS Durham Victory worked closely with the US Navy ship USS Mazama, which was an ammunition ship.

She loaded the destroyer USS Heywood L. Edwards with ammunition on October 30, 1944, at San Pedro Bay on the Philippine Islands.

On October 24, before the Battle of Surigao Strait later that night, the ship had the only large caliber, above six inch, ammunition available. The ship's small crew, lack of winchmen and experience in handling munitions was a problem compounded by "the indifference and lack of cooperation of the Durham Victory's officers and crew." That issue was serious enough for the COMDESRON 56 report to recommend civilian ships not be used in combat areas. The report stated: "With a serious enemy threat developing, with all ships greatly depleted, and with time a very potent factor, the commanding officer of this ship put every obstacle he could possibly think of in the way of replenishment operations. He was the most disagreeable, uncooperative individual it has ever been my misfortune to run up against. He refused to work through the noon hour. Ships would arrive alongside on schedule and his hatches would still be battened down. He refused to handle lines. This would add from one to two hours to each day's operations. His disrespectable (sic) crew would sit around and pass disparaging remarks to the already overworked and tired enlisted men. He himself sat up on his bridge in his undershirt and cursed and yelled at our officers and men. Our replenishment program progressed in spite of him-not because of him. It cannot be too strongly recommended that regular navy ammunition ships be utilized in combat areas."

She supplied ammo to the light cruiser USS Denver (CL-58) on October 25, 1944, near Surigao Strait. SS Durham Victory was key in the support of the invasion of the Philippines. She was part of Task Unit (TU) 77.7.1, which were supporting ships, including the T1 tanker USS Chepachet (AO-78), oilers Ashtabula (AO-51), Saranac (AO-74), and Salamonie (AO-26), and the merchant ship SS Pueblo. The Task Unit was joined on October 12th by the destroyer escorts Willmarth (DE-638) and Whitehurst (DE-634) (out of Blanche Harbor), steering for Naval Base Kossol Roads and then final preparations for the assault. Other escorts in the TU were Witter (DE-636) and Bowers (DE-637).

In 1945, she anchored at the Ulithi atoll and supplied ammunition to a number of ships for the Battle of Leyte and other actions. On August 10th, 1945, SS Durham Victory supplied the battleship USS New Jersey (BB-62) with 225 rounds of ammo for her 16", 20mm and 40mm guns.

== Honors ==
SS Durham Victory earned two Battle Stars for combat action, one in the Leyte landings from November 23rd, 1944, to November 29th, 1944, and one for action from January 9th, 1945, to January 18th, 1945, in the Battle of Luzon. Durham Victory used her deck guns to defend herself and other ships from attacks.

== Private Cargo Service ==
In 1946, the SS Durham Victory was sold to the Holland America Line of Rotterdam, and was renamed the SS Averdijk in 1954. In 1967, she was sold to Consolidated Mariner S.A of Panama and renamed the MV Domina. In 1972, she was taken to Taiwan and scrapped.

== See also ==
- List of Victory ships
- Liberty ship
- Type C1 ship
- Type C2 ship
- Type C3 ship

== Sources ==
- Sawyer, L.A. and W.H. Mitchell. Victory ships and tankers: The history of the ‘Victory’ type cargo ships and of the tankers built in the United States of America during World War II, Cornell Maritime Press, 1974, 0-87033-182-5.
- United States Maritime Commission:
- Victory Cargo Ships
