= USS Willmarth =

Buckley-class destroyer escort

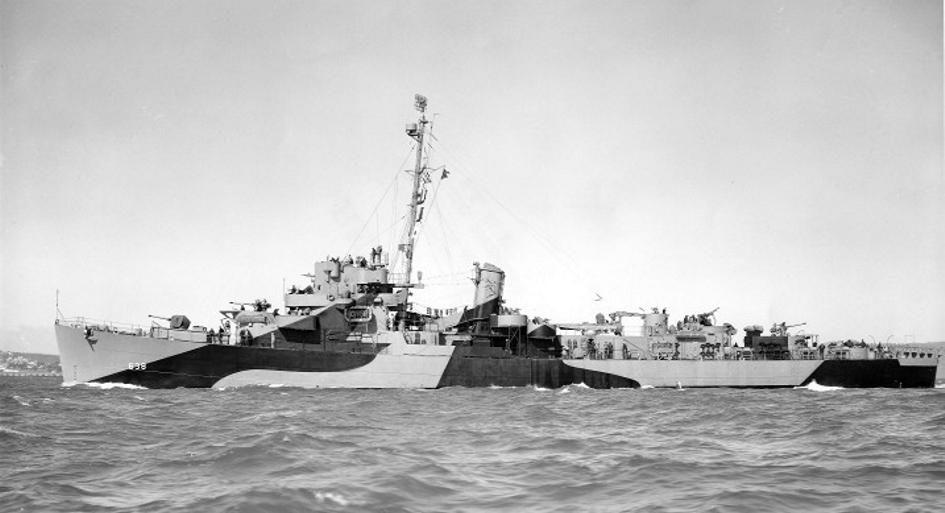

History

United States
- Name: USS Willmarth
- Namesake: Ens. Kenneth Willmarth, USN
- Ordered: 1942
- Builder: Bethlehem Shipbuilding Corporation, San Francisco, California
- Laid down: 25 June 1943
- Launched: 21 November 1943
- Commissioned: 13 March 1944
- Decommissioned: 26 April 1946
- Stricken: 1 December 1966
- Honors and awards: 4 battle stars (World War II)
- Fate: Sold for scrap, 1 July 1968

General characteristics
- Class & type: Buckley-class destroyer escort
- Displacement: 1,400 long tons (1,422 t) standard; 1,740 long tons (1,768 t) full load
- Length: 306 ft (93 m)
- Beam: 37 ft (11 m)
- Draft: 9 ft 6 in (2.90 m) standard; 11 ft 3 in (3.43 m) full load
- Propulsion: 2 × boilers; General Electric turbo-electric drive; 12,000 shp (8.9 MW); 2 × solid manganese-bronze 3,600 lb (1,600 kg) 3-bladed propellers, 8 ft 6 in (2.59 m) diameter, 7 ft 7 in (2.31 m) pitch; 2 × rudders; 359 tons fuel oil
- Speed: 23 knots (43 km/h; 26 mph)
- Range: 3,700 nmi (6,900 km) at 15 kn (28 km/h; 17 mph); 6,000 nmi (11,000 km) at 12 kn (22 km/h; 14 mph)
- Complement: 15 officers, 198 men
- Armament: 3 × 3"/50 caliber guns; 1 × quad 1.1"/75 caliber gun; 8 × single 20 mm guns; 1 × triple 21-inch (533 mm) torpedo tubes; 1 × Hedgehog anti-submarine mortar; 8 × K-gun depth charge projectors; 2 × depth charge tracks

USS Willmarth (DE-638) was a Buckley-class destroyer escort in service with the United States Navy from 1944 to 1946. She was scrapped in 1968.

== History ==
Willmarth was named in honor of Ensign Kenneth Willmarth (1914-1942), who was killed in action when the cruiser Vincennes was sunk during the Battle of Savo Island on 9 August 1942. The ship was laid down on 25 June 1943 at San Francisco, California, by the Bethlehem Steel Company's Shipbuilding Division; launched on 21 November 1943; sponsored by Mrs. Eva Willmarth, the mother of Ens. Willmarth; and commissioned on 13 March 1944.

=== Solomon Islands ===
Following shakedown out of San Diego and post-shakedown availability at her builder's yard, Willmarth was assigned to Escort Division 40. She stood out of San Francisco Bay on 31 May, as screen for the four-ship Convoy 2410 bound for Hawaii, and arrived at Pearl Harbor on 9 June.

On 12 June, together with Donaldson (DE-44) and Reynolds (DE-42), Willmarth screened the sortie of the Marshall Islands-bound Convoy 4212-A. After delivering the convoy safely at Eniwetok nine days later, Willmarth proceeded on to the Treasury Islands, anchoring in Blanche Harbor at 11:30 on the 26th.

Shifting successively to Tulagi and Purvis Bay, Willmarth operated on local escort and patrol missions in the Solomon and Treasury Islands groups for the remainder of July. She escorted a small convoy to Dreger Harbor, New Guinea, between 1 and 5 August and then shifted to Milne Bay for repairs on her port propeller.

=== Challenging an unknown ship ===
Underway for the Treasury Islands on 24 August, Willmarth made radar contact with an unidentified ship at 02:00 on the 25th. Willmarth tracked the stranger and challenged her at 03:35, when about two miles (3 km) distant. The latter did not reply, but instead altered course away from the destroyer escort and increased speed. Willmarth in turn churned up 18 knots (33 km/h) and went to general quarters at 03:40.

Willmarth repeated the challenge at 04:06 but again received no reply. On the port beam of her target, the escort vessel illuminated the stranger with her searchlight and discovered her to be a freighter of some 8,000 to 10,000 tons. Only 2,500 yards (2,300 m) away, Willmarth's men could see the freighter's crew manning their guns to challenge the destroyer escort.

Willmarth opened the range to 4,000 yards (3,700 m) as the freighter responded with two different call signs, perhaps seeking to confuse the escort vessel. Just as Willmarth began to flash a call for recognition signals, the freighter commenced fire with 3-inch (76 mm) guns. The destroyer escort rang down for 20 knots (37 km/h) and opened the range to 8,000 yards (7,300 m), refraining from firing because of the stranger's appearance and location, "indicating that it was friendly." With respect to the freighter's fierce – but ineffective – fire, Willmarth's war diarist noted that the ship's "range was excellent, but deflection was off." No shells landed closer than 1,000 yards (910 m) away.

=== Escort ship ===
Willmarth subsequently anchored at Blanche Harbor later on the 25th. Late the next day, she got underway on an escort assignment and convoyed Stratford (AP-41) to Green Island, Bougainville, arriving on the 29th to screen the transport as she unloaded. She eventually escorted the troopship to Emirau Island and Torokina, Bougainville, before proceeding independently to the Treasury Islands. She conducted training exercises over the balance of September before she performed local escort missions and the like out of her Treasury Islands' base into October.

Willmarth departed Blanche Harbor on 6 October in company with Whitehurst (DE-634), bound for Dutch New Guinea. She arrived three days later and sortied on the 12th with Task Unit (TU) 77.7.1 which included Ashtabula (AO-51), Saranac (AO-74), Chepachet (AO-78), Salamonie (AO-26), Mazama (AE-9), and merchant ship SS Pueblo. Other escorts were Witter (DE-636), Bowers (DE-637), and Whitehurst.

Willmarth operated with TU 77.7.1 until she was released late on the 13th to escort Chepachet and SS Pueblo to Kossol Passage, in the Palaus. Arriving there at 18:21 on the 14th, she remained anchored for two days before beginning to patrol the harbor entrance on the 17th. Relieved of this duty by Lovelace (DE-198), Willmarth got underway during the forenoon on 20 October to screen the sortie of Ashtabula, Saranac, Chepachet, Salamonie, Mazama, and SS Durham Victory for the Philippines.

=== Philippines campaign ===
Willmarth proceeded north with her convoy, while American troops splashed ashore on the beaches of Leyte to commence the liberation of the Philippines. On the 23rd, three days after the main landing began, the destroyer escort anchored off Leyte midway between the northern and southern transport areas while her oilers refueled the ships from Task Group (TG) 77.2. That evening, Willmarth steamed eastward toward a night anchorage and, at 18:25, observed anti-aircraft fire over the northern transport area.

Underway again off Homonhon Island early the next morning, the destroyer escort received a report of enemy aircraft orbiting over the northern transport area. As she steamed along the convoy's flank, she commenced making black smoke at 08:44 to lay a protective screen in anticipation of the enemy's arrival. While the radio crackled with reports of ships under attack, Willmarth spotted no enemy planes nearby, only many puffs of "flak" splattering the skies to the westward of her screening position in the refueling group.

With the receipt of a "flash white" at 13:43, the oilers resumed refueling TG 77.2. Willmarth shifted to Samar Island shortly before 17:00 before going to general quarters at 17:06 upon receipt of a "flash red." After waiting for well over an hour for the enemy to make an appearance, the convoy stopped and prepared to anchor for the night.

At 18:43, however, three "Jills" roared in low from the east, torpedoes slung menacingly beneath their bellies. Willmarth's guns opened fire on two just before they released their "fish." One torpedo holed Ashtabula and forced her to a halt, dead in the water. While the oiler's repair parties controlled the flooding and patched the hole, the convoy passed out of Leyte Gulf and reformed in the wake of the attack. Eventually, Ashtabula, repairs effected, rejoined at 22:30.

Willmarth and the convoy remained underway throughout the evening, maneuvering on various courses and speeds in Leyte Gulf until the first rays of sunlight streaked the eastern skies. After going to general quarters at 04:58, the destroyer escort remained at battle stations throughout the day. Less than an hour after her crew first closed up at action stations, two "Jills" attacked the convoy from the westward. Willmarth immediately opened fire with her 3-inch (76 mm) and 1.1-inch (28 mm) batteries. As one "Jill" roared across the stern of the convoy, it was caught by gunfire from Willmarth and other ships of the convoy and crashed in flames far astern.

While maneuvering and making smoke to mask the convoy, the destroyer escort spotted a floating mine which she sank with gunfire. Soon thereafter, another "Jill" passed through the area and drew fire from Willmarth. The shells were not observed to hit; and the plane escaped.

The convoy anchored in the fueling area at 11:52, three hours after the last attack. Willmarth and the other escorts screened the convoy and provided an anti-submarine screen patrol around the valuable auxiliaries. Later that afternoon, Willmarth repulsed an attack made by a lone plane which came out of the sun in a glide-bombing attack at 14:20. The destroyer escort's gunfire damaged the plane and caused it to spin into the water about five miles (8 km) away.

The convoy departed the fueling area at 16:46. Frequent alerts and enemy planes enlivened the evening hours as the group maneuvered throughout the night in a retirement formation. Willmarth's war diarist noted that the Japanese planes seemed loath to attack ships in the fueling area during daylight, probably because of the heavy concentration of anti-aircraft fire that could be directed at an attacker.

The next day, 26 October, saw a repetition of the same routine that had kept the destroyer escort active since her arrival in Leyte Gulf three days earlier. After maneuvering on screening duties through the night, the warship spotted a lone "Val" dive bomber making an attack at 05:50; Willmarth opened fire from 6,000 yards (5,500 m) but failed to score any hits. Within minutes, she and her sister escorts were laying smoke screens to cover the convoy for the next hour. Thereafter, they provided anti-submarine screening protection while the oilers conducted fueling operations.

=== Further escort duty ===
After following the same routine on the 27th, Willmarth departed Leyte Gulf and headed for the Palaus. At 08:00 on 28 October, Willmarth – escorting the oilers earmarked to refuel the 7th Fleet ships – rendezvoused with the carriers of Task Group 77.4 and screened the refuelling operations for the balance of the day. Detached that afternoon, Willmarth screened Ashtabula and Chepachet as they voyaged to Kossol Roads, in the Palaus. Arriving on 31 October, Willmarth refueled from Mascoma (AO-83) and anchored, her job done.

The respite afforded the destroyer escort was a brief one, however, for she got underway on 1 November for Hollandia and Seeadler Harbor, escorting a convoy. Entering Humboldt Bay on the 4th, Willmarth anchored there over the next two days before proceeding to sea to screen the sortie of TG 78.4 – HMS Ariadne, 12 LSM's, 4 LCI's, 8 LCI(G)'s, PC-1122 and PC-1133 – on the 7th.

=== Western New Guinea campaign ===
For the next three days, Willmarth screened the convoy to its destination – Mapia and Asia Islands, near Morotai – before arriving in the invasion area on the 11th. As the convoy neared Morotai, Willmarth's lookouts observed anti-aircraft fire between 04:15 and 05:30. Two "bogies" passed within four miles (6 km) of the convoy; but, as Wilmarth's war diarist recorded, "evidently they either did not sight us or were not interested, as they proceeded directly toward the area from which flak appeared." There was a reason why Willmarth did not open fire on the two planes that seemed so close – she carried the only reliable air-warning radar in the entire convoy and to open fire prematurely would have disclosed the position of the little convoy and exposed it to possible air attacks. At 08:32, the destroyer escort anchored just off the southern coast of Morotai, near Ariadne, while the remainder of the convoy (save the LCM's) proceeded to another part of the island to load for the impending invasion of Mapia and Asia Islands. The mission of the assault group was to establish weather station and LORAN – long range radio aid to navigation – facilities.

On 13 November, with the assault ships having embarked their troops, Willmarth got underway in company with TG 78.14, bound for Pegun Island. At 05:00, two days later – she was joined by Shaw (DD-373) and Caldwell (DD-605). Willmarth, the two destroyers, and PC-1122 bombarded the southern part of the island prior to the landings and provoked no return fire from the beach. After a half-hour of firing, Ariadne signalled that "H" hour was 06:30, meaning that the first wave of LVT(A)s would hit the reef at that time.

Willmarth remained at her bombardment station for the rest of the morning, ceasing fire as the first assault wave splashed toward the beachhead. The accompanying LCI(G)'s laid their own barrage, thus obviating the need for the destroyers' gunfire. By noon, the island was in American hands. When surrounded, the remaining garrison – only 12 to 14 Japanese soldiers – committed suicide.

Meanwhile, since she was not needed for bombardment, Willmarth patrolled to the northward of the invasion beach and came across canoes full of natives to the north. One native, speaking good English, told Willmarth that the remainder of the Japanese garrison, about 170 men, had waded across the reef to Bras Island the previous night – thus accounting for the sparse reception given the invasion forces.

While plans were being laid to go after this remnant on Bras Island, Willmarth conducted anti-submarine patrol around the unloading assault craft and made abortive attempts to pull several LCI's that had been stranded by low tides off the reefs. At 17:30 on the 15th, the destroyer escort succeeded in towing one off after about an hour's time and began operations to free another one of the infantry assault craft. However, the destroyer escort's efforts were frustrated by the line's parting and the near approach of darkness.

Four LCI(G)'s had to be left on the reef – as was one LCI – when the task group headed for Morotai. Arriving on 17 November, Willmarth fueled from Salamonie before anchoring. Underway again on the 18th, with the Asia Island occupation force, Willmarth and two PC's served as escort for Ariadne, four LCM's, four LCI's, and four LCI(G)'s. Embarked in the assault craft were 400 troops.

Three-fourths of a mile off Igi Island, Willmarth, Ariadne, and PC-1122 conducted shore bombardment from 05:42 to 06:19 on the 19th. Troops splashed ashore from landing craft eight minutes after the bombardment ceased and met no opposition. As a result of the shore bombardment, two natives were wounded and one killed – the Japanese had evacuated the island in the face of imminent invasion the previous evening.

Willmarth subsequently screened the movement of the convoy to the Mapia Islands, where the landing craft loaded troops and unloaded shore personnel and supplies. When the loading was completed at 18:00 on the 20th, the convoy shifted to Asia Island, where the destroyer escort screened the landing craft as they embarked more troops on the 21st. Willmarth continued her screening duties until arriving in the southernanchorage near the naval base at Morotai Island at 12:38 on 22 November. While there, the escort vessel witnessed an enemy night air raid on the airfield installations on Morotai. The Japanese boldly conducted their attacks despite anti-aircraft fire and searchlights. Local port restrictions forbade the use of any anti-aircraft batteries larger than 40 millimeter. Willmarth's war diary sadly noted this restriction, recommending that 3-inch gunfire could do very little damage to shore installations in the area.

While the rest of TG 78.14 departed Morotai on the 23rd, Willmarth remained behind as LSM-205 and LSM-314 loaded equipment for the Asia and Mapia Island forces. She then escorted those craft to Hollandia where they delivered their cargo. Over the next three days, Willmarth escorted the two landing craft on their appointed rounds, dropping off supplies at Asia and Mapia Islands. At one point, the arrival of the little convoy at Mapia on the 26th almost went unnoticed.

Willmarth experienced great difficulty contacting anyone on shore: "We finally succeeded in rousing someone by blowing our siren and whistle together." A jeep soon appeared on the beach, its occupants using the headlights to signal. Heavier swells than at Asia Island made unloading through the surf difficult. One of the LSM's was holed several times by scraping on the jagged coral heads of the reef. When unloading was completed at 11:30, the diminutive convoy headed for Hollandia.

=== Service Squadron 4 ===
On 1 December 1944, Willmarth and the other ships from Escort Division 40 set sail for Manus, in the Admiralties, for assignment to Service Squadron 4. Arriving at Seeadler Harbor the following day, Willmarth spent the next three months operating on local escort missions between Manus, Ulithi, Hollandia, and the Palaus.

On 4 March 1945, Willmarth reported to the Commander, 5th Fleet, for duty. Between the 5th and 18th, she conducted anti-submarine patrols in the Palaus before being sent to Ulithi to refuel and replenish.

=== Okinawa campaign ===
At Ulithi, Willmarth was assigned to Task Force 54 (TF 54) – the pre-invasion bombardment group for the invasion of Okinawa. She got underway again on the 21st to as part of Fire Support Unit 2 (TU 54.1.2) built around the battleship Colorado (BB-45), in Fire Support (FS) areas 4 and 5, off Okinawa. The destroyer escort screened Colorado for the entire day on 26 March as the battleship delivered gunfire support for the troops ashore. Over the next two days, the warship screened fire support units and escorted them to night retirement areas. She was refuelled at Kerama Retto on the 30th before returning to screening duties with heavy units off the island.

On 1 April, she was steaming on station 16 of a circular screen around TU 54.3.2, a night retirement group built around the battleship Idaho (BB-42), when several enemy planes flew near the convoy. Screening destroyers fired upon the intruders who probably did not come to attack the Allied force but merely to keep it awake and permit it little rest.

Detached from this duty to provide a screen for Arkansas (BB-33), one of the oldest battleships on active service in the Navy, Willmarth operated to seaward as the battleship worked inshore to open fire on Japanese positions holding up the American advance near Naha Airport. After commencing this duty at 06:30, Willmarth had been serving on anti-submarine patrol for over six hours when Japanese shore battery guns boomed out salvoes at Arkansas.

Arkansas' main battery trained 'round to reply and quickly commenced counter-battery fire. At the time of the initial firing, Willmarth was located about 1 mile (1.6 km) southwestward of the battleship, maintaining her screening position to seaward. At 13:23, a Japanese shell hurtled over Willmarth's bridge "plainly heard" by all men there. It splashed beyond the ship, 150 yards (140 m) away. With only one boiler operating (the other had been secured to repair a leaking gasket) the destroyer escort was hampered in getting away, but she headed seaward at her best speed. Soon another shell landed only 15 yards (14 m) beyond the destroyer escort's starboard quarter. While increasing the range, Willmarth turned toward each splash, thus avoiding getting hit by the Japanese guns. Arkansas, by this time beyond gun range of the Nipponese guns, did not conduct any further counter-battery fire; Willmarth soon emerged from the enemy battery's zone of fire and proceeded to sea unscathed.

After retiring to Kerama Retto soon thereafter for fueling, Willmarth operated on screening station A-27 until 6 April, when she returned to Kerama Retto with an appendicitis patient on board for medical treatment. Several bogies flew near the ship while she steamed to the fleet anchorage, and one was downed by a nearby ship at 02:00.

As the Japanese air arm had been decimated by this point in the war, the lack of trained and experienced pilots led to its most extensive deployment of kamikaze attacks during this battle. At 15:25, while still 3 miles (4.8 km) north of Kerama Retto, Willmarth spotted three "Val" dive bombers. One peeled off and maneuvered to make an attack. Ten minutes later, the "Val" turned kamikaze, attempting to crashing into Willmarth. Heavy 3-inch (76 mm) and 1.1-inch (28 mm) fire bracketed the plane when she became visible, dodging in and out of the broken clouds overhead. Seven 3-inch (76 mm) bursts rocked the plane as she made her deadly approach. Lookouts on the destroyer escort noted a thin line of smoke tracking from the suicider's port wing as he went into his dive. The 20-millimeter battery on Wilmarth opened fire when the plane's range lessened to 2,000 yards (1,800 m); and, at 800 yards (730 m), the Oerlikons seemed to have their effect. Pieces of the "Val's" wing began flying off in the slipstream, indicating that the shells were beginning to hit. Six feet of the port wing soon broke away, shot off by the flak, and the "Val" spun into the sea 20 yards (18 m) off the ship's port side, slightly abaft her beam.

Willmarth entered Kerama Retto at 16:10; and, while preparing to anchor, saw LST-447 hit by a kamikaze south of the harbor entrance. Flames had engulfed the entire amidships section of the stricken landing ship, and explosions tore holes in the stricken ship's side. The jagged edges in turn ripped gashes in Willmarth's hull at the waterline. One hole opened up one of the destroyer escort's fuel tanks, and the oil leaking out made further close operations hazardous.

Willmarth stood clear while dense smoke from the burning LST further complicated firefighting. Eventually, the destroyer escort picked up the ship's survivors and later transferred them to Crescent City (APA-21). While steaming to the ship's anchorage in the harbor, she took an enemy plane under fire as it approached from the south; and multiple gunfire from all ships present in the harbor knocked it down.

Willmarth anchored, transferred her appendicitis patient ashore, and patched the hole in her side caused by the damaged LST-447 before proceeding on the 7th to screening station "Able-60" near the transport area off the west coast of Okinawa. Following her shift to another screening station on the morning of the 8th, Willmarth escorted Saranac (AO-74) to Kerama Retto on the 9th. On 10 April, the destroyer escort departed the Okinawa area, bound for Guam in the screen for 12 transports.

=== Screening 3rd Fleet logistics force ===
Arriving at Guam on the 14th, Willmarth developed boiler trouble while there and spent the entire month of May and most of June undergoing repairs. On 28 June, the destroyer escort got underway for Ulithi. En route, she picked up a sonar contact, and in company with Trippe (DD-403), over the ensuing two days, conducted an unsuccessful hunt. Willmarth then proceeded on to Ulithi where she arrived on the last day of June.

Underway again on 3 July, Willmarth stood out of Ulithi lagoon screening the logistics force of the 3rd Fleet which would provide the needed supplies for Admiral William F. Halsey's fast carrier task forces as it pounded the Japanese homeland. During the passage north, the destroyer escort planeguarded for Steamer Bay (CVE-87) and conducted anti-submarine screening operations. She picked up the crew of a downed Grumman TBF Avenger on 20 July. On that occasion, two swimmers from Willmarth helped to get the downed airmen on board. However, one of the crewmen died. The two survivors and the body of the dead man were transferred to Steamer Bay later that day.

Willmarth subsequently planeguarded for Gilbert Islands (CVE-107) in early August, continuing her screening and escort duties with TG-30 – the replenishment group for the 3rd Fleet. She was at sea when the atomic bombs were dropped upon Hiroshima and Nagasaki on 6 and 9 August, respectively, and when Japan surrendered on the 15th.

=== Post-war activities ===
Willmarth remained on escort duty off the coast of Japan into September. In mid-September, the ship underwent an availability in Tokyo Bay and rode out a storm there on 18 September. Departing Tokyo Bay on 24 September to return to the United States, Willmarth touched at Pearl Harbor, San Diego, and the Panama Canal before undergoing an overhaul at Norfolk, Virginia which lasted until late in October.

=== Decommissioning and disposal ===
Shifting to the St. Johns River, Florida, soon thereafter, Willmarth prepared for inactivation with the Florida group of the 16th (Reserve) Fleet. Berthed in the Green Cove Springs facility, Willmarth was decommissioned on 26 April 1946 and placed in reserve. She remained there until struck from the Navy List on 1 December 1966. Sold on 1 July 1968 to the North American Smelting Company, of Wilmington, Delaware, the ship was broken up for scrap soon thereafter.

== Awards ==
Willmarth received four battle stars for her participation in World War II.
