= USS Abercrombie =

1944 John C. Butler-class destroyer escort

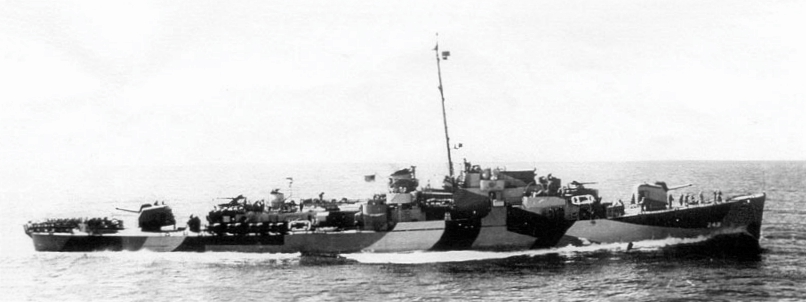
- USS Abercrombie (DE-343) underway c. 1944

History

United States
- Name: Abercrombie
- Namesake: William Abercrombie
- Builder: Consolidated Steel Corporation, Orange, Texas
- Laid down: 8 November 1943
- Launched: 14 January 1944
- Commissioned: 1 May 1944
- Decommissioned: 15 June 1946
- Stricken: 1 May 1967
- Identification: DE-343
- Fate: Sunk as target 7 January 1968

General characteristics
- Class & type: John C. Butler-class destroyer escort
- Displacement: 1,350 long tons (1,372 t)
- Length: 306 ft (93 m)
- Beam: 36 ft 8 in (11.18 m)
- Draft: 9 ft 5 in (2.87 m)
- Installed power: 2 boilers; 12,000 shp (8,900 kW)
- Propulsion: 2 geared turbine engines; 2 propellers
- Speed: 24 knots (44 km/h; 28 mph)
- Range: 6,000 nmi (11,000 km; 6,900 mi) at 12 kn (22 km/h; 14 mph)
- Complement: 222
- Armament: 2 × single 5 in (127 mm) guns; 2 × twin 40 mm (1.6 in) AA guns; 10 × single 20 mm (0.79 in) AA guns; 1 × triple 21 in (533 mm) torpedo tubes; 8 × depth charge throwers; 1 × Hedgehog ASW mortar; 2 × depth charge racks

USS Abercrombie (DE-343) was a John C. Butler-class destroyer escort in the service of the United States Navy from 1944 to 1946. She was finally sunk as a target in 1968.

== Namesake ==
William Warner Abercrombie was born on 24 July 1914 in Medford, Oregon. He enlisted in the United States Naval Reserve as a seaman 2nd class at Kansas City, Kansas, on 27 August 1940. After undergoing elimination flight training at the Naval Reserve Aviation Base, Kansas City, from 16 September to 5 October, he received an honorable discharge on 24 December 1940, to accept an appointment as an aviation cadet, USNR, on 27 December. Three days later he arrived at the Naval Air Station, Pensacola, Florida, to begin his formal flight training. He underwent further instruction at Naval Air Station Miami before he received his wings on 10 July 1941. He was appointed Ensign on 4 August 1941, he arrived at Naval Air Station Norfolk, Virginia, for temporary duty. There he joined Torpedo Squadron 8 (VT-8), established on 2 September 1941 under the command of Lieutenant Commander John C. Waldron.

During the Battle of Midway on the morning of 4 June 1942, Waldron led 15 Douglas TBD Devastators, one piloted by Abercrombie, from the USS Hornet's flight deck. He located the Imperial Japanese Navy carrier force and led them in on their torpedo runs. VT-8 pressed home a desperate attack in the face of fighters and heavy antiaircraft fire, and all 15 planes were shot down. Abercrombie received a Navy Cross, and a share of VT-8's Presidential Unit Citation, posthumously.

== History ==
=== Construction and commissioning ===
Abercrombie's keel was laid down on 8 November 1943 at Orange, Texas by the Consolidated Steel Corporation. Abercrombie was launched on 14 January 1944, sponsored by Mrs. C. W. Abercrombie, mother of the late Ensign Abercrombie, and commissioned on 1 May 1944.

=== May – October 1944 ===
The destroyer escort spent the first three weeks of May in the vicinity of Galveston, Texas either at sea in the Gulf of Mexico testing her ordnance and equipment or in port receiving finishing touches in preparation for shakedown training. She conducted her shakedown cruise in the British West Indies late in May and early in June before putting into Boston on 25 June for post-shakedown repairs. Eleven days later, Abercrombie headed south to Norfolk where she stopped over on the night of 7 and 8 July. From there the warship took departure for Aruba, a Dutch island off the coast of Venezuela, and a transshipment and refining center for Venezuelan crude oil, in company with USS Walter C. Wann, USS Chepachet, and USS Salamonie. Abercrombie and Walter C. Wann shepherded the two oilers into port at Aruba late in the evening of 15 July. Two days later after the oilers loaded cargo, the convoy put to sea again.

After seeing Chepachet and Salamonie safely to the Panama Canal, Abercrombie began two weeks of patrol and escort duty in the Caribbean Sea that ended on 1 August when she entered the canal. Following two days of liberty at Balboa, Panama, the destroyer escort got underway for San Diego where she arrived on 11 August. On 22 August, Abercrombie set sail for Hawaii, arriving at Pearl Harbor a week later. For three weeks, the warship conducted training exercises with escort carriers in the Hawaiian Islands before putting to sea on 19 September to escort USS General W. F. Hase to Manus in the Admiralty Islands.

Abercrombie and her charge entered Seeadler Harbor at Manus on 30 September. The destroyer escort remained there for two weeks. On 14 October, she returned to sea and joined the screen of an escort carrier task group on its way to provide close air support for the amphibious landings at Leyte in the Philippine Islands. After rendezvousing with a large convoy of amphibious ships and merchantmen off Hollandia on the northern coast of New Guinea, Abercrombie's group set course for the Philippines. The convoy arrived in Leyte Gulf on 20 October not long after the troops had made the initial landings. Leaving the reinforcement convoy in Leyte Gulf, Abercrombie escorted the small carriers to their operating area east of the Philippines.

For the next five days, the destroyer escort screened the carriers against submarine and air attack while their aviators supported the troops on Leyte with close support and interdiction sorties. While not actually engaged in any of the three phases of the Battle for Leyte Gulf fought on 24 and 25 October, Abercrombie was close enough for her crew to watch some portions of the phase known as the Battle off Samar on 25 October when a Japanese surface force of battleships, cruisers, and destroyers made a surface gun attack on the escort carriers, destroyers, and destroyer escorts of the northernmost elements of her Task Group (TG) 77.4.

=== November 1944 – March 1945 ===
After the excitement of 25 October, the warship spent the remainder of the month screening the escort carriers. She then headed back to Manus in the Admiralty Islands where she arrived on 3 November. Abercrombie remained at Manus for most of November, setting sail for the northern Solomons, Bougainville on 28 November. After amphibious landing exercises at Cape Torokina on Bougainville and at Huon Gulf, New Guinea, she returned to Manus to make final preparations for the invasion of Luzon.

On 27 December, the destroyer escort put to sea in company with a large group of amphibious ships. For the invasion of Luzon, Abercrombie served as the flagship for TG 79.9, Control Group "Able," of Vice Admiral Theodore S. Wilkinson's Task Force (TF) 79, the Lingayen Attack Force. Steaming northwest to Leyte Gulf thence through the Surigao Strait, she passed through the Mindanao Sea around the southern tip of Negros and turned north to transit the Sulu Sea. From that point on to Lingayen Gulf, Japanese aircraft and midget submarines harassed the invasion force. Though enemy aircraft sank several American warships and damaged a number of others, the combat air patrol (CAP) provided a fairly effective umbrella, and only a small percentage of the raiders succeeded in penetrating the aerial shield. As a consequence, Abercrombie's guns remained silent throughout the passage.

On the night of 8 and 9 January 1945, the destroyer escort entered Lingayen Gulf. Early on the morning of the 9th, she steamed in close to shore to take up station as a control ship for the amphibious craft. She anchored about 4,500 yards (4,100 m) off the main assault beaches near the town of Lingayen. During the final pre-invasion bombardment, Abercrombie's guns opened fire on the enemy for the first time when a kamikaze dived on USS Columbia. In spite of the defensive efforts of the ships around the cruiser, the aircraft succeeded in crashing Columbia, the third enemy plane to do so in as many days. Not long thereafter, Abercrombie turned to her primary mission as landing craft of the first assault waves formed up on her for the run to the beaches. For most of the morning, landing craft lined up under her direction before starting for the shore.

By 1100, the general lack of resistance on the beaches allowed the transports and cargo ships to move inshore to complete disembarking troops and unloading supplies and equipment. That development freed Abercrombie of control ship duties, and she steamed out to join the antiaircraft screen for empty transports awaiting the formation of convoys for the return voyage to rear area bases. That evening, the warship stood out of Lingayen Gulf in the screen of one such convoy and escorted it by way of Leyte to Biak in the Schouten Islands. From there, Abercrombie carried out another convoy escort mission, seeing troops and equipment safely to Mindoro in the Philippines. The destroyer escort then voyaged to Ulithi Atoll in the Western Carolines for two weeks of rest and relaxation. At the conclusion of that interlude, she returned to Leyte where she made preparations for and trained for the invasion of the Ryukyu Islands.

On 21 March, Abercrombie departed Leyte with TG 51.1 as part of the screen for the Western Islands Attack Group. That unit's assignment was to secure Kerama Retto, a group of small islands located to the west of the southern half of Okinawa, before the main assault for use as a fleet anchorage, replenishment area, and temporary repair facility. Her unit, therefore, went into action in the Ryūkyūs a week before the majority of the invasion force. For five days, she provided antiaircraft and antisubmarine protection for the naval units supporting the subjection of that group of islets. On 1 April, attention shifted to the main objective when the landing force stormed ashore on Okinawa itself. Abercrombie spent another five days guarding the supporting ships against attack by Japanese submarines and planes.

=== April – December 1945 ===
She cleared the Ryukyu Islands on 5 April in company with Task Unit (TU) 51.29.4 and set a course for the Marianas. The destroyer escort stopped at Saipan from 9 to 11 April and then put to sea in company with USS Mustin bound for Ulithi. After spending the night of 12 and 13 April at Ulithi, Abercrombie sortied from the anchorage on 13 April with TG 55.8 for the return voyage to Okinawa.

Arriving back in the Ryūkyūs on 17 April, the destroyer escort spent the next two months performing a variety of services in support of the campaign to wrest Okinawa from the Japanese. During that period, anti-air defense proved to be the most pressing problem. Enemy air power in the form of both kamikaze and conventional raids tested the Navy's endurance nearly to the limit. Ships such as Abercrombie patrolling the radar picket stations surrounding Okinawa provided early warnings of incoming air raids and bore the brunt of those onslaughts. The destroyer escort tangled with Japanese planes on at least 16 separate occasions, claiming two definite kills and two assists. When not standing watch on a radar picket station, Abercrombie conducted antisubmarine searches, rescued downed American airmen, and provided escort services to a variety of ships.

On 14 June, the warship departed the Ryūkyūs in company with TU 31.29.8, bound for the Marianas. She arrived at Saipan four days later and remained there, undergoing routine maintenance while her crew enjoyed some respite from the rigors of duty at Okinawa, until the end of the month. Abercrombie returned to sea on 1 July to proceed independently to Okinawa. She reached her destination on 4 July 1945 but remained there only two days. On 6 July, she cleared the Ryūkyūs as a unit of TF 32 to join the US 3rd Fleet in its rampage through Japanese home waters. Over the ensuing three weeks, she screened the larger units of the fleet against a submarine threat that probably did not exist and sank mines. On 31 July, Abercrombie returned to Okinawa and resumed antiaircraft and antisubmarine defense duties for a week.

The warship took departure from Okinawa once again on 8 August and shaped a course for Leyte in the Philippines. She entered San Pedro Bay at Leyte on the 11th and commenced a nine-day maintenance period. Abercrombie stood out of San Pedro Bay on 20 August and headed back to Okinawa. She stayed in the vicinity of Okinawa from 23 August to 9 September and then embarked upon a voyage to escort occupation forces to Korea. She arrived in Jinsen (now Inchon), Korea, on the 15th and departed again on 17 September. The warship made a three-day stopover at Okinawa between 19 and 22 September and then headed for occupation duty in Japan. Abercrombie entered Wakanoura Wan, Honshū, on 24 September, and began six weeks of duty in support of the forces occupying Japan. On 4 November, the destroyer escort concluded her assignment in Japan and laid in a course for the United States. Steaming by way of Pearl Harbor, she entered port at San Pedro, California on 21 November and began preparations for inactivation.

=== 1946–1968 ===
Early in 1946, Abercrombie was towed to San Diego where she was placed out of commission on 15 June 1946. Berthed with the San Diego Group, Pacific Reserve Fleet, the destroyer escort remained inactive there until sometime in the mid-1950s when she was moved to Bremerton, Washington. On 1 May 1967, her name was struck from the Navy list. In November, she was towed back to San Diego and, on 7 January 1968, the warship was sunk as a target by the guns, missiles, and aircraft of a task group built around USS Bon Homme Richard off San Diego, California.

== Honors ==
Abercrombie earned four battle stars during World War II.
