= USS Walter C. Wann =

WWII US destroyer escort

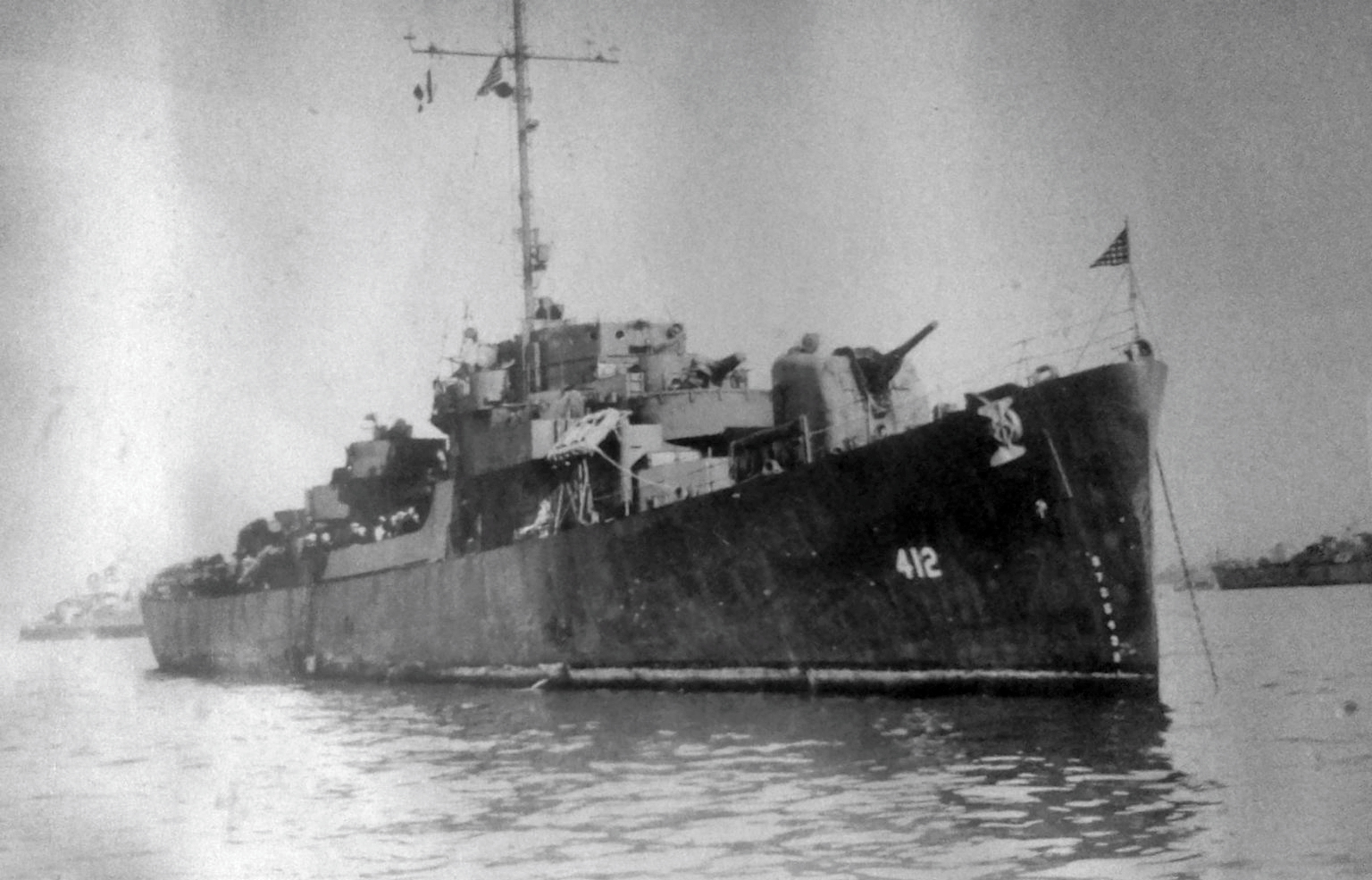
- USS Walter C. Wann

History

United States
- Name: Walter C. Wann
- Laid down: 6 December 1943
- Launched: 19 January 1944
- Commissioned: 2 May 1944
- Decommissioned: 31 May 1946
- Stricken: 30 June 1968
- Fate: Sold to the National Metal and Steel Company, Terminal Island, California for scrap in June 1969

General characteristics
- Class & type: John C. Butler-class destroyer escort
- Displacement: 1,350 long tons (1,372 t)
- Length: 360 ft (110 m)
- Beam: 36 ft 10 in (11.23 m)
- Draft: 13 ft 4 in (4.06 m)
- Speed: 24 knots (44 km/h; 28 mph)
- Complement: 186

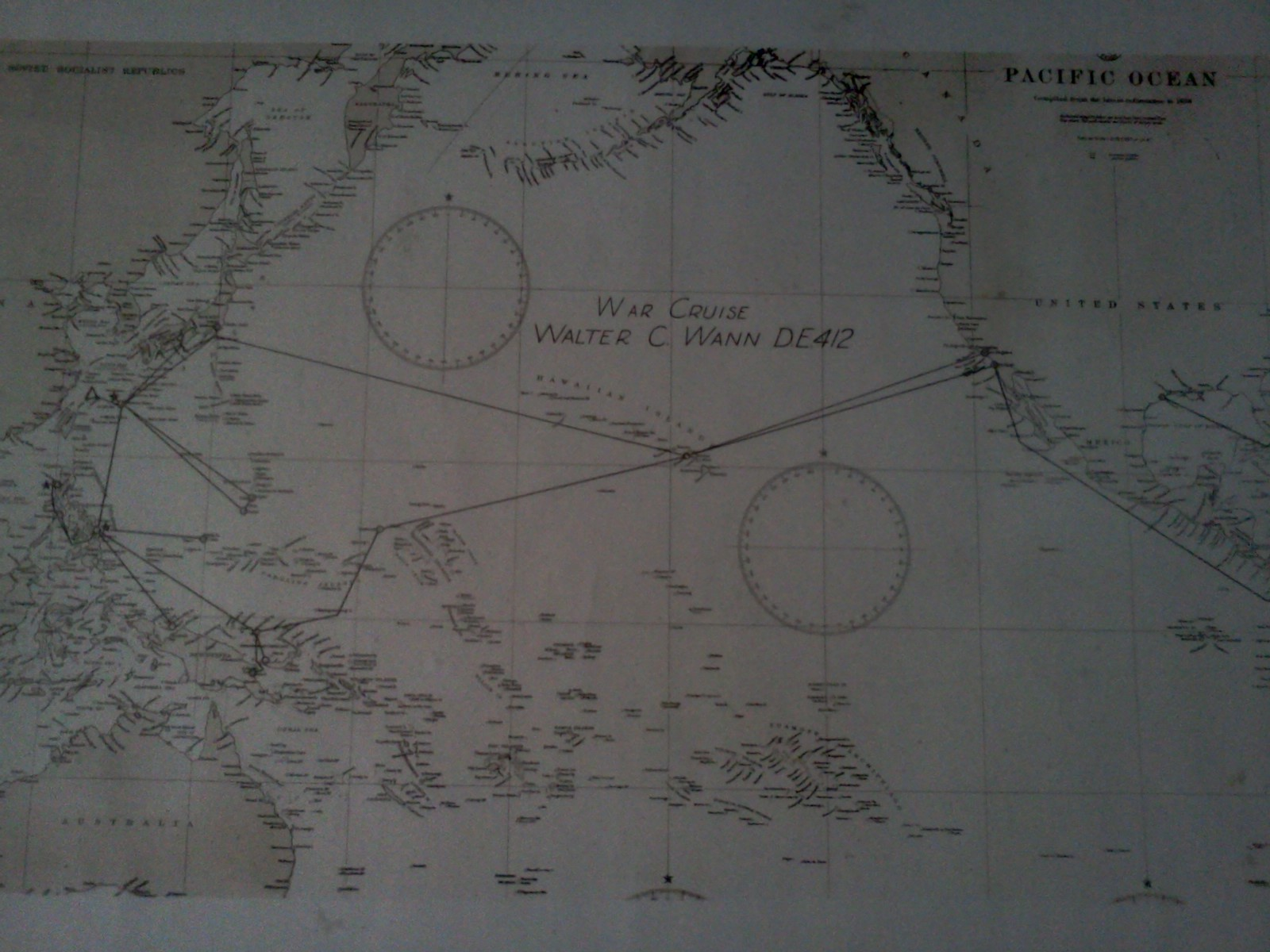
War cruise map

USS Walter C. Wann (DE-412) was a John C. Butler-class destroyer escort built by Brown Shipbuilding at their yard in Houston, Texas. The ship was launched on 19 January 1944. The ship was sponsored by Mrs. Anna Wann, the mother of Pharmacist's Mate Wann, the ship's namesake. She was commissioned on 2 May 1944. The destroyer escort received four battle stars for World War II service. Walter C. Wann was decommissioned on 31 May 1946 and placed in reserve at San Diego, California after two years and one month active service. The vessel was struck from the Navy Register on 30 June 1968 for disposal. In June 1969 Walter C. Wann was sold to the National Metal and Steel Company, Terminal Island, California, for scrap and broken up.

== Namesake ==
Walter Carl Wann, Jr. was born on 13 May 1921 in Goldendale, Washington. He graduated from Bandon High School and later enlisted in the United States Navy on 14 December 1939. While stationed in San Diego on 7 December 1941, he was assigned to a vessel to return the wounded to the West Coast. He was then stationed with the Marine invasion forces destined for Guadalcanal, Solomon Islands.

Petty Officer Wann was honored for his actions on 7 August 1942 while assigned as a corpsman with the Marines in action during an engagement with Japanese forces on a causeway between Gavutu and Tanambogo Islands, Solomon Islands. Although the causeway was under direct fire from Japanese machine guns, Wann, with utter disregard for his own personal safety, volunteered to cross the area in order to render aid and return casualties to the aid station. Ignoring the enemy fire, he sprinted back and forth, carrying and rendering aid to wounded Marines. He remained attached to Marine units in the Guadalcanal campaign until he was killed in action on 4 November 1942. As a result of his exceptional courage he was posthumously awarded the Silver Star.

== History ==
=== World War II ===
Following her Caribbean shakedown from 25 May to 23 June, Walter C. Wann underwent availability at Boston from 24 June to 5 July and got underway on 6 July in company with the destroyer escort Abercrombie, bound for Hampton Roads, Virginia. Arriving at Norfolk on 7 July, Walter C. Wann and Abercrombie got underway the next day for the Dutch West Indies. She escorted four gasoline tankers to St. Nicholas Bay, Aruba, where they loaded petroleum cargoes from 13 to 15 July. The task unit proceeded thence to Cristóbal, Panama Canal Zone, and arrived on 17 July, whereupon the unit was dissolved, and the escorts were assigned to duty with the Panama Sea Frontier.

Walter C. Wann soon joined Abercrombie and McCoy Reynolds in antisubmarine patrols on the Aruba-Canal Zone tanker route as TU 05.3.2 as a result of increased U-boat activity in the vicinity. The destroyer escort departed for Guantánamo Bay, Cuba, on 21 July, in company with McCoy Reynolds. On the afternoon of 22 July, the two ships received orders to assist a downed Martin PBM Mariner approximately 200 miles (320 km) away. Walter C. Wann and her sister ship picked up all 40 survivors; and McCoy Reynolds prepared to tow the plane to port, but the arrival of SC-1281 on the scene obviated her undertaking that task. Walter C. Wann then proceeded to Kingston, Jamaica, to disembark the survivors. She proceeded back to sea escorting two merchantmen to the Canal Zone, and arrived at Cristóbal with her charges on the evening of 25 July. She transited the Panama Canal the next day and reported for duty with the Pacific Fleet on 27 July.

Walter C. Wann, in company with LeRay Wilson and McCoy Reynolds, departed Balboa on 29 July; proceeded to the California coast, and arrived at San Diego on 6 August. From 7 August to 4 September, the ship underwent major engineering repairs and received a new high-pressure turbine, conducting sea trials for the new turbine. She then got underway for Hawaii on 5 September, proceeding independently, and arrived at Pearl Harbor six days later.

Walter C. Wann sortied in the screen of Task Group 77.4— the escort carrier group commanded by Rear Admiral Thomas L. Sprague—and nicknamed "Taffy Two"— on 12 October, to support American landings at Leyte in the Philippine Islands. While en route to the launching areas off Leyte Gulf, a tropical disturbance of near-typhoon intensity struck the task group on 17 October.

Local combat air patrols (CAP) protected the carriers as they launched their air strikes against Japanese positions on Leyte; and, as a result, Walter C. Wann and her fellow escorts did not initially see any enemy air activity. Operating off Samar during the daytime, the group retired each evening to the eastward.

Arriving back off Samar on 25 October to commence the day's air strikes, TG 77.4 received reconnaissance reports indicating the closing presence of a large Japanese surface force; and, by 0700, the northern carrier group, TU 77.4.3, was under attack. Walter C. Wann, with the southern carrier group, screened her charges as they launched all available aircraft while retiring to the southeast. By 0900, the enemy forces— reported as consisting of three battleships, eight cruisers, and numerous destroyers—closed the southern group. On the horizon to the northward could be seen pillars of smoke from the death struggle of the northern group—four groups of shell splashes suddenly erupted astern of Walter C. Wann as the enemy dropped in their heavy shells and groped for the range. While the destroyers of the southern group prepared to make smoke and dash in, in a suicidal torpedo attack, Walter C. Wann and her sister ships formed a circular screen around the highly vulnerable escort carriers. Air strikes and torpedo attacks had by 1100 diverted the Japanese from the carriers, and the range opened to 40 miles (64 km), thus ending the immediate threat to the southern group.

After retiring to the Admiralty Islands, Walter C. Wann anchored at Seeadler Harbor on 3 November. Walter C. Wann again came close to being damaged at Manus on 10 November when the auxiliary vessel Mount Hood blew up in a cataclysmic blast which atomized the ammunition ship and damaged many other ships in the immediate area. Walter C. Wann, 2,000 yards (1,800 m) off the doomed ship's port quarter, found herself showered by debris from the exploding ammunition ship but sustained only minimal damage, and none of her crew were hurt.

Back on escort duty on 27 November, the destroyer escort screened Transport Division 10 on its voyage to Cape Gloucester, New Britain, arriving at Borgen Bay on 28 November. She conducted antisubmarine screening off the entrance to the bay until proceeding independently to Manus on 30 November—anchoring at Seeadler Harbor in December. While at Manus, the ship received additional radio equipment, thus outfitting herself for her new duty of landing craft control ship during the Lingayen Gulf landings on the Philippine island of Luzon. A round-trip voyage to and from New Britain preceded her linking up with TG 79.6; and, on 15 December, Capt. E. A. Seay (Commander, TG 79.6, and Commander, LST Flotilla 14) embarked with his staff; Walter C. Wann then departed for training exercises and acted as flag and control ship. Capt. Seay then disembarked on 22 December and transferred to LST-610.

On 27 December 1944, Walter C. Wann got underway as part of TU 79.11.3, screening TG 79.5 and 79.6. On 2 January, she fell in astern of TG 78.5 and proceeded through Surigao Strait and into the Mindanao Sea on 5 January and into the Sulu Sea the next day. On 7 January, while the American force was in the Mindoro Strait, two Nakajima Ki-43 "Oscars" attacked the disposition astern of Walter C. Wann at 1822. One dropped a bomb and was shot down by an LST, and the second attacked Walter C. Wann, only to be driven off by antiaircraft fire.

The destroyer escort reached Lingayen Gulf on 9 January and took station ahead of TG 79.6—Tractor Group Baker—as control ship, anchoring off Lingayen beach at 0737. Capt. Seay returned to Walter C. Wann and established his temporary headquarters on board. While she lay anchored off Lingayen, Walter C. Wann provided antiaircraft fire in attempts to repel Japanese kamikaze attacks. However, despite the intense antiaircraft fire, one plane succeeded in crashing into the cruiser USS Columbia some 1,500 yards (1,400 m) ahead of the destroyer escort. Another kamikaze attempted to attack the battleship Pennsylvania—located off the destroyer escort's starboard beam—but was driven off, heavily damaged.

At 1530 on 9 January, Walter C. Wann got underway and moved in a further 1,800 yards (1,600 m) toward Lingayen and dropped anchor off the town. CTG 79.6 shifted to LST-610 soon thereafter, and the destroyer escort, thus relieved of her control-ship duties, got underway again to proceed through a heavy smoke screen and rendezvous as part of the screen for TU 79.14.1 which was proceeding to Leyte Gulf.

This task unit—consisting of kamikaze-damaged Columbia, Louisville, and Australian heavy cruiser Australia, as well as transports, LSDs, LSVs—was attacked by a single plane on 10 January but drove off the attacker with gunfire. Two days later, the destroyer escort and the destroyer Jenkins escorted the escort carrier Kadashan Bay to the inner harbor of San Pedro Bay, Leyte, and anchored there at 1957 on 12 January. She spent 14 January on antisubmarine patrol before returning to her anchorage on 15 January for provisioning.

Walter C. Wann conducted local operations and convoy escort missions between Dutch New Guinea and Philippine waters into the late winter of 1944 and 1945. She got underway on 27 March in the screen for Transport Group "Easy," bound for Nansei Shoto in the Ryukyus. Approaching Okinawa Shima with the invasion force on the morning of D day, 1 April, her task unit was deployed to their respective screening stations—Walter C. Wann taking station A-29. At 0603 on 1 April, the destroyer escort took an "Oscar" under fire, but the pilot commenced evasive maneuvers and banked away from the ship. That evening, Transport Division 40, one of Transport Group "Easy," conducted night retirement, with Walter C. Wann among the escorts.

Upon conclusion of the night retirement evolutions, Walter C. Wann screened the transports at various stations and participated in a hunter/killer group operation. For the remainder of her first week off Okinawa and into the second, the ship observed considerable air raids—some taking heavy tolls on American light forces engaged in supporting the invasion of Okinawa.

At 1309 on 12 April, the Japanese launched a determined series of air strikes which lasted until 1720. During this time, at 1418, an Aichi D3A "Val" began a suicide dive on Walter C. Wann from the starboard side. At about 500 yards (460 m) away, the dive bomber faltered, pulled up slightly, and crossed the ship in a steep vertical bank before crashing 20 feet (6.1 m) off the port bow. At 1500, a second attack occurred, another "Val" streaking in for Walter C. Wann. The destroyer escort's gunners set it afire; and, as it faltered, the "Val" was shot out of the sky by two American fighters.

Walter C. Wann remained on patrol off Okinawa until 14 April, when she sailed for Guam in company with the battleships Nevada and Maryland, and the cruiser Pensacola, as TU 51.29.14, escorting a convoy of transports. Arriving at Apra Harbor, Guam, on 19 April, Walter C. Wann effected battle damage repairs until 6 May, when she sailed for Saipan in the Marianas.

She next escorted TU 94.19.18—attack transports, LSTs, LCIs and LSMs—in company with Hemminger and three submarine chasers, arriving at Okinawa on 14 May. For the next several days following her arrival, Walter C. Wann was assigned to various patrol stations and, although frequent enemy air attacks sent the ship to an anxious succession of alerts at general quarters, she did not encounter any enemy aircraft herself. The destroyer escort remained on screening duty, supporting the Okinawa strike through June, escorting everything from landing ship docks (LSDs) to light cruisers. On 4 July, Walter C. Wann joined Vice Admiral Jesse B. Oldendorf's Task Force 32. TF 32 provided cover for the operations in the Ryukyus and for the minesweeping operations underway in the East China Sea (conducted by TG 39.11).

Walter C. Wann remained engaged in screening operations for the remainder of the war and was at anchor in Buckner Bay when word of the Japanese surrender first came through. The ship conducted training exercises and tactical drills into September, subsequently riding out four typhoons between July and October. During this time, the ship steamed to Waka-yama, Honshu, Japan, standing in readiness to render support for the landings there should it be needed. The 6th Army landed without incident to occupy the key Osaka-Kyoto-Kobe area, and Walter C. Wann later rendered plane-guard duties for Suwannee off the Hiroshima-Kure occupation zone.

Walter C. Wann continued her support duties for the American occupation of Japan through the late fall of 1945. On 4 November, in company with CortDiv 69, the destroyer escort got underway from Yokosuka, bound, via Pearl Harbor, for San Diego, California.

Assigned to the 19th Fleet (Pacific Reserve Fleet), Walter C. Wann was placed out of commission, in reserve, at San Diego, California, on 31 May 1946.

=== Fate ===
Her post-1946 records are sketchy. Some documents suggest that in November 1951 the ship may have joined reserve training exercises, although she is officially listed as being "in reserve, out of commission." Movement reports indicate that the ship was at San Diego from 8 November 1951 to 5 June 1956; at Long Beach from 5 to 22 June 1956; and at San Diego from 23 June 1956 to 10 June 1958. Further indications show the ship attached to the San Diego Reserve Group into 1960 and berthed at the Stockton Reserve Facility near Mare Island, Vallejo, California. In any event, Walter C. Wann was struck from the Navy list on 30 June 1968; acquired by the National Metal and Steel Corporation, of Terminal Island, California, in June 1969; and scrapped soon thereafter.
