= USS Bowers =

Buckley-class destroyer escort

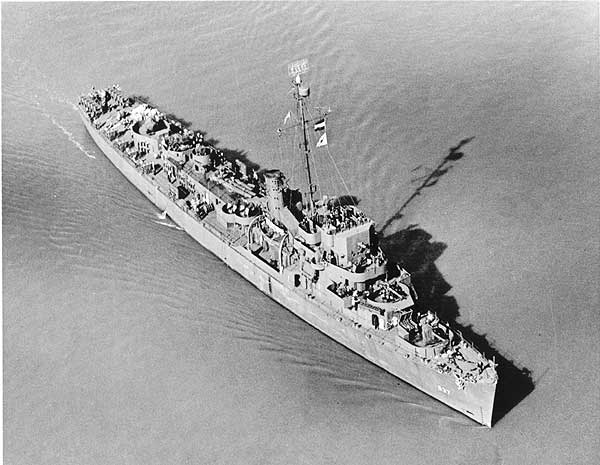
- Aerial shot of USS Bowers (DE-637) off Alameda, California.

History

United States
- Name: Bowers
- Ordered: 1942
- Builder: Bethlehem Steel
- Laid down: 28 May 1943
- Launched: 31 October 1943
- Commissioned: 27 January 1944
- Recommissioned: 6 February 1951
- Decommissioned: 18 December 1958
- Reclassified: 25 June 1945
- Stricken: 1 May 1961
- Identification: Hull number: DE-637/APD-40
- Fate: Transferred to the Philippines on 21 April 1961

Philippines
- Name: Rajah Soliman
- Acquired: 31 October 1960
- Commissioned: unconfirmed
- Decommissioned: December 1964
- Stricken: December 1964
- Identification: D-66
- Fate: Sunk 29 June 1964, raised December 1964. Hulk sold to Mitsubishi International Corp., January 1966

General characteristics
- Class & type: Buckley-class destroyer escort
- Displacement: 1,400 long tons (1,400 t) standard; 1,740 long tons (1,770 t) full load
- Length: 306 ft (93 m)
- Beam: 37 ft (11 m)
- Draft: 9.5 ft (2.9 m) standard; 11.25 ft (3.43 m) full load
- Propulsion: 2 boilers, General Electric turbo-electric drive; 2 propellers; 12,000 hp (8,900 kW)
- Speed: 23 knots (43 km/h; 26 mph)
- Range: 6,000 nmi (11,000 km; 6,900 mi) at 12 knots (22 km/h; 14 mph)
- Endurance: 359 long tons (365 t) oil
- Complement: 15 officers, 198 enlisted
- Armament: 3 × 3 in (76 mm) cal. guns; 4 × 1.1"/75 caliber gun anti-aircraft guns (1x4); 8 × 20 mm guns (8x1); 3 × 21 in (533 mm) torpedo tubes (1x3); 1 × hedgehog projector; 8 × K-gun depth charge projectors; 2 × depth charge tracks

USS Bowers (DE-637/APD-40) was a Buckley-class destroyer escort of the United States Navy, was named in honor of Ensign Robert K. Bowers (1915–1941), who was killed in action aboard the battleship USS California during the Japanese attack on Pearl Harbor on 7 December 1941. The ship was laid down on 28 May 1943 at San Francisco, California, by the Bethlehem Steel Company; launched on 31 October, sponsored by Mrs. Eunice Bowers, the mother of Ensign Bowers; and commissioned on 27 January 1944. The ship served in World War II in the Pacific

== Service history ==
=== World War II ===
From 15 February to 15 March 1944, the new destroyer escort carried out shakedown training out of San Diego and then returned north to San Francisco for post-shakedown availability. She departed San Francisco Bay on 31 March and headed for the Hawaiian Islands. Bowers entered Pearl Harbor on 6 April and, after several days on the gunnery range, joined a convoy travelling via Kwajalein in the Marshall Islands to Manus in the Admiralty Islands. The ship reached Seeadler Harbor on 26 April, but was sent out on the 30th to search for pilots and crews of two airplanes that had crashed offshore. She later returned to port with 17 survivors.

Bowers got underway on 5 May to escort the submarine USS Seahorse to her patrol area off Finschhafen, New Guinea. Then, off Cape Cretin on 17 May, she joined the screen for a nine-ship convoy and protected those vessels until they anchored safely in Langemak Bay on the 24th. A week later, she commenced the first in a series of voyages escorting convoys between New Guinea, Wakde Island, and the Solomons. The destroyer escort operated on this circuit for four months while Allied forces consolidated their grip on the northern Solomons. On 5 August, while off the mouth of the Jaba River on Bougainville Island, she bombarded a small contingent of Japanese soldiers holding out against the Allied forces controlling the island. After destroying a floating mine on 19 August, Bowers searched the area around Bougainville and Treasury Island for a submarine reported to be in the vicinity. Her duties in the northern Solomons ended at Biak, New Guinea, where she joined a group of fleet oilers bound for the Philippines to support the American landing on Leyte.

The convoy left Humboldt Bay on 12 October, and Bowers remained with the oilers until they entered Surigao Strait on 23 October. During the Leyte campaign, the oilers shuttled between Kossol Passage and Leyte Gulf to fuel warships of the 7th Fleet, and Bowers saw the safely back and forth. Only one oiler suffered from enemy action while in Bowers care. USS Ashtabula was hit by a Japanese torpedo bomber while underway off Samar on 24 October. On 28 October, Bowers rescued the pilot of an aircraft that missed the flight deck of the escort carrier USS Kadashan Bay. The fueling group stood into Kossol Roads on the last day of October; and, for the remainder of the year, Bowers escorted convoys of oilers and supply ships between Kossol Roads, Leyte GuIf, Humboldt Bay, Seeadler Harbor, and Ulithi.

The destroyer escort stood out of Ulithi on 23 January 1945, bound for Seeadler Harbor, where she served as a part of an anti-submarine screen operating in the ocean approaches to the Caroline and Marshall Islands. On 28 March, as part of Task Force 54 (TF 54) for the invasion of Okinawa, Bowers set sail with a convoy of troopships from Ulithi bound for Okinawa. Bowers entered the transport anchorage off the Hagushi beaches at Okinawa during the morning of 1 April and, just after nightfall, fought off the first of many attacks by enemy planes.

On 3 April, Bowers was assigned to a radar picket station about 10 miles (16 km) north of Kerama Retto to provide the other ships around Okinawa with an early warning of approaching air attacks. That day, a single torpedo bomber attacked Bowers and USS Gendreau, but the latter escort shot down the offending plane before it could do any damage. The next day, Bowers' gunners shot down another torpedo bomber. The ensuing nine days were quiet with no targets.

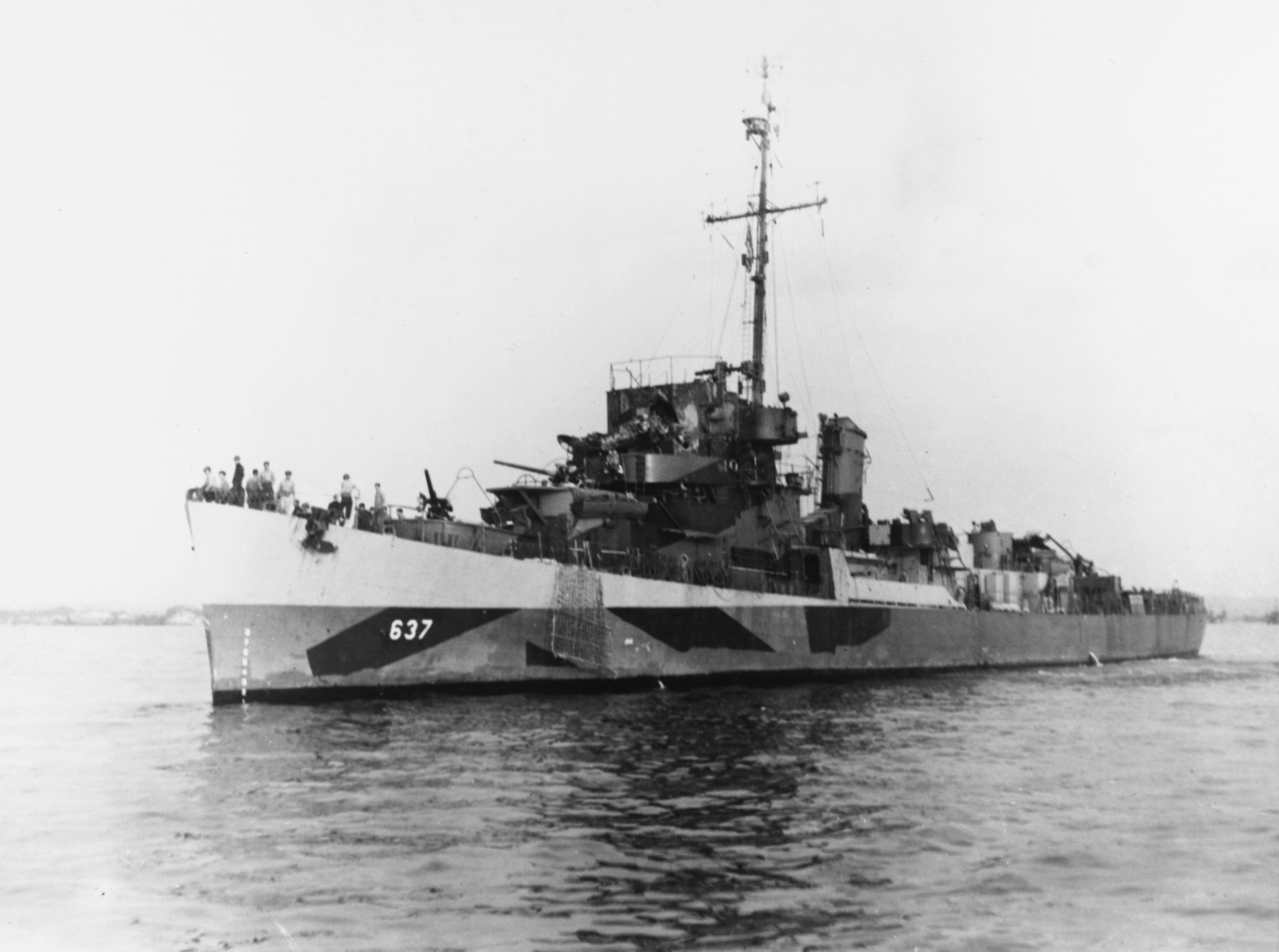
Bowers with crashed Japanese Nakajima Ki-43 on the bridge

Bowers was then assigned to anti-submarine screen duty six miles north of Ie Shima. At dawn on 16 April, the destroyer escort shot down one attacking Japanese plane. Then at 09:30, two more low-flying planes came in. Bowers maneuvered to avoid the planes as they split to attack the escort. The first came in dead ahead, but Bowers' guns brought it down. The second passed over the ship. Despite the heavy gunfire, the kamikaze regained altitude, turned, and came in from a 45-degree angle forward. It crashed into the warship's flying bridge, spraying high octane gasoline over the bridge and pilot house. The plane's bomb penetrated the pilot house and continued down through the ship for 20 feet (6.1 m) before it exploded and sprayed the deck with fragments. Fire fighting parties brought the flames under control in about 45 minutes; but 37 men from the ship were killed, 11 were reported missing, and many of the 56 wounded died later.

Bowers slowly headed for the Hagushi anchorage under her own power. With the aid of the repair ship USS Nestor, Bowers was seaworthy again by 21 April. Three days later, she sailed in a convoy for Ulithi, whence she continued on via Pearl Harbor to the California coast. She arrived at San Diego on 24 May and was ordered on to the Philadelphia Naval Shipyard for conversion to a Charles Lawrence-class high speed transport. The warship entered the shipyard on 15 June and was re-designated APD-40 on 25 June 1945. Her conversion was not completed until after the war's end.

=== After the war ===
After her conversion was completed, the new high speed transport got underway on 19 September for training at Guantanamo Bay, Cuba. She returned to Philadelphia on 25 October for the Navy Day celebration and then steamed to Green Cove Springs, Florida, where she languished in limbo for more than a year before being decommissioned on 10 February 1947.

Recommissioned at Green Cove Springs on 6 February 1951, Bowers joined the Amphibious Force, Atlantic Fleet. After five weeks at Guantanamo Bay for training, she embarked upon a series of short training exercises for marines, underwater demolition teams (UDTs), and midshipmen. The high-speed transport operated off the east coast until March 1955, although she made a six-week cruise to the West Indies and a five-month cruise to the Mediterranean. In November 1954, Bowers entered the Charleston Naval Shipyard for a three-month overhaul. Upon completion, she reported to the Commandant, 6th Naval District, at Charleston for duty as a naval reserve training ship. From March 1955 until December 1958 the warship embarked reservists for training cruises along the east coast and in the West Indies.

=== Philippine service ===
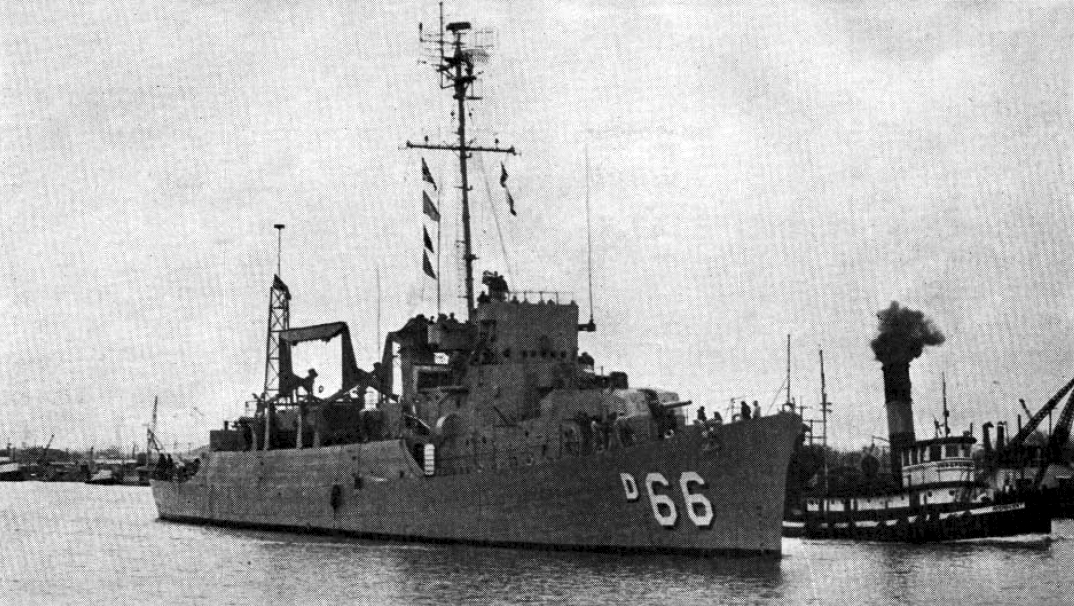
As RPS Rajah Soliman of the Philippine Navy.

The high-speed transport was decommissioned again on 18 December 1958 and berthed with the reserve fleet at Orange, Texas. Bowers was transferred to the Republic of the Philippines on 21 April 1961 under terms of the Mutual Security Act of 1954 and commissioned in the Philippine Navy as Rajah Soliman. Her name was struck from the Navy list on 1 May 1961.

In 1964, while she was moored in the Bataan National Shipyard, a typhoon battered Rajah Soliman, capsizing her alongside the pier. The Navy helped the Philippines to raise the warship and tow her to Subic Bay's Ship Repair Facility for final disposition. However, the warship was deemed unsalvageable, and her hulk was sold to Mitsubishi International Corporation on 31 January 1966 for scrapping.

=== Battle stars ===
Bowers earned four battle stars for her World War II service.
