= USS Saranac (AO-74) =

Oiler of the United States Navy

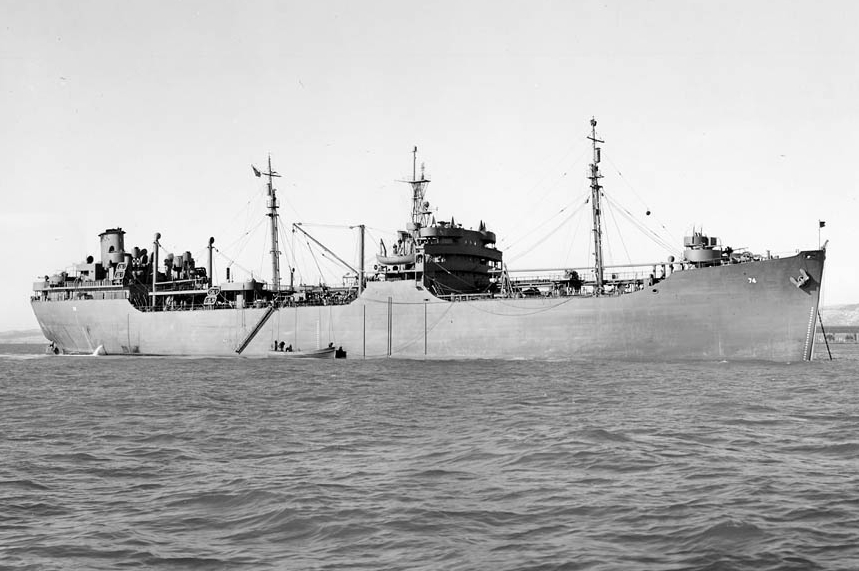

History

United States
- Name: USS Saranac
- Namesake: Saranac River in New York
- Builder: Sun Shipbuilding & Drydock Co., Chester, Pennsylvania
- Laid down: 27 August 1942, as SS Cowpens
- Launched: 21 December 1942
- Acquired: 31 December 1942
- Commissioned: 22 February 1943
- Decommissioned: 19 July 1946
- In service: 1946
- Out of service: 1956
- Renamed: Saranac, 16 September 1942
- Reclassified: YFP-9 (Floating Power Barge), 1 September 1954
- Stricken: 26 March 1956
- Honors and awards: 5 battle stars (World War II)
- Fate: Sold, 4 December 1957

General characteristics
- Type: Suamico-class fleet replenishment oiler
- Displacement: 5,782 long tons (5,875 t) light; 21,880 long tons (22,231 t) full
- Length: 523 ft 6 in (159.56 m)
- Beam: 68 ft (21 m)
- Draft: 30 ft (9.1 m)
- Propulsion: Turbo-electric, single screw, 8,000 hp (5,966 kW)
- Speed: 15.3 knots (28.3 km/h)
- Capacity: 140,000 barrels (22,000 m^{3}) gasoline
- Complement: 257
- Armament: 1 × 5"/38 caliber gun; 4 × 3"/50 caliber guns; 4 × twin 40 mm AA guns; 4 × twin 20 mm AA guns; 2 × depth charge projectors

USS Saranac (AO-74), originally named the SS Cowpens, was a Type T2-SE-A1 Suamico-class fleet oiler of the United States Navy, and the fourth ship of the Navy to bear the name.

Laid down under Maritime Commission contract (MC hull 337) on 27 August 1942 as Cowpens by Sun Shipbuilding & Drydock Co. of Chester, Pennsylvania, the ship was launched on 21 December 1942, sponsored by Mrs. A. Poestrak. She was renamed Saranac on 16 September 1942, acquired by the U.S. Navy on 31 December 1942, and commissioned on 22 February 1943.

== Service history ==
=== 1943 ===
After shakedown along the Atlantic coast, Saranac sailed from Norfolk for Aruba on 20 April 1943. There, she took on fuel and proceeded to the Pacific, arriving at Pearl Harbor on 26 May. Sailing two days later, she underwent repairs at San Francisco from 5 to 19 June and departed on 23 June for the Aleutian Islands. After arriving at Adak on 30 June, she serviced ships both underway and in port, from 9 July until departing on the 14th to reload at San Pedro, California. She then returned to the Aleutians and fueled ships at anchor in Kulak Bay from 4 to 16 August. Between 30 August and 12 October, she made one voyage transporting oil from San Pedro to tanks ashore at Tutuila, Samoa, and at Espiritu Santo.

Saranac then began replenishment operations in support of the U.S. Navy's advance in the central Pacific. She left Pearl Harbor on 25 November and fueled fleet units at Espiritu Santo from 13 to 21 December. With an underway replenishment group, she refueled units of a fast carrier force headed by the Bunker Hill (CV-17) on 27 December. She then resumed in-port fueling operations based on Port Purvis and Eniwetok.

=== 1944 ===
Saranac departed Eniwetok on 12 January 1944 for overhaul at San Pedro. Underway again from the west coast on 4 March, Saranac arrived at Majuro on 21 March. She operated there for almost three months, fueling ships in port, sortieing three times as a unit of an underway replenishment group to refuel fast carrier forces at sea, and making a fast run to Pearl Harbor in April to refill her tanks. On her third underway refueling assignment, her luck ran out as her group was located on 18 June by Japanese aircraft searching for escort carriers in the vicinity, and all three oilers were hit. Saranac's after superstructure and her fire room were badly damaged, and she lost nine men; seven killed and two missing. Early the next morning, under her own power and, after emergency repairs at Eniwetok, she arrived at San Pedro, California, on 18 July for permanent repairs.

Saranac departed San Pedro on 6 September and joined an underway replenishment group at Purvis Bay, on arrival, on 28 September. After three sorties from that port to fuel fleet units, she shifted her base to Kossol Roads, Palau, on 19 October in preparation for the amphibious invasion of the Gulf of Leyte in the Philippines. She departed the next day and fueled ships in the transport anchorage off Leyte from 23 to 27 October. Returning to Kossol Roads on 30 October, she sailed the next day for Hollandia, where she arrived on 4 November. After fueling numerous ships in port, she departed Hollandia on 5 December. The oiler suffered a turbine casualty the next day and put into Manus for repairs, which lasted until 21 December. She then returned to Humboldt Bay, but left on 28 December for permanent engine repairs at Pearl Harbor.

=== 1945–1946 ===
Her overhaul at Pearl lasted from 13 January to 9 March 1945. Back at Ulithi on 23 March, Saranac resumed fueling fleet units there until getting underway on 1 April to support the invasion of Okinawa. While the troops ashore fought to secure the island and fleet units battled Japanese kamikazes offshore, Saranac carried out underway replenishment off the island as part of the logistics support group, until getting underway on 12 April to refill her tanks at Ulithi. She rejoined the underway replenishment forces off Okinawa on 22 April and provided continuous services until sailing once again for Ulithi on 8 June. On her return to Okinawa on 3 July, she anchored at Kerama Retto and provided fuel to ships there. She continued this duty for the next three months, leaving the area only to return to Ulithi for more fuel and to ride out typhoons off Okinawa.

The oiler departed Okinawa on 5 October bound for Shanghai, China, where she provided fuel to United States ships operating off China after the Japanese surrender. She left for Yokosuka on 21 December 1945 and, on 3 January 1946, sailed for Pearl Harbor.

=== 1946–1956 ===
She returned to Yokohama on 20 February 1946, and Shanghai on 27 February. Then on 4 March, steamed from that port for the United States and arrived at San Francisco on 21 March. Saranac was then selected for conversion to a floating power plant to support dredging operations at Guam. At Alameda, California, she was stripped of all military equipment not required for the passage to Guam and fitted with power regulators and transformers. The ship sailed for Guam on 19 June 1946 and decommissioned there on 19 July, soon after arrival.

After continuous use as a power facility, she commenced overhaul at the Ship Repair Facility, Guam, on 24 May 1951. She was loaned to the army on 25 August 1951, and departed Guam on 26 October under tow to Inchon, Korea, where she provided power to U.S. Army installations ashore. The ship was returned to navy custody on 15 October 1953, reclassified YFP-9 (Floating Power Barge) on 1 September 1954, and struck from the Navy List on 26 March 1956.

== Sale ==
She was sold to Hugo Neu Corporation, New York, on 4 December 1957 for use as a power facility abroad by the International Steel and Metal Corporation. The ship was renamed Somerset in 1959.

She was in use as a floating power station at Kobe, Japan in 1971, subsequent fate unknown.

== Awards ==
Saranac received five battle stars for her World War II service.
