= USS Witter =

Buckley-class destroyer escort

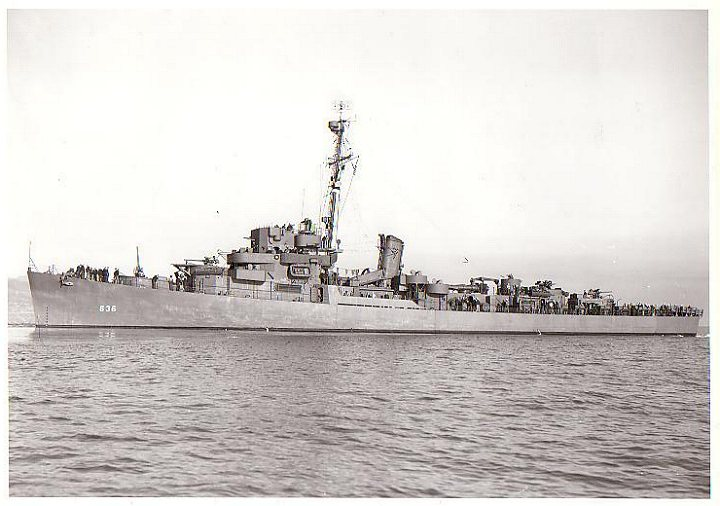

History

United States
- Name: USS Witter
- Namesake: Jean C. Witter
- Ordered: 1942
- Builder: Bethlehem Shipbuilding Corporation, San Francisco, California
- Laid down: 28 April 1943
- Launched: 17 October 1943
- Commissioned: 19 December 1943
- Decommissioned: 29 October 1945
- Stricken: 16 November 1945
- Honors and awards: 2 battle stars (World War II)
- Fate: Sold and broken up, 2 December 1946

General characteristics
- Class & type: Buckley-class destroyer escort
- Displacement: 1,400 long tons (1,422 t) standard; 1,740 long tons (1,768 t) full load
- Length: 306 ft (93 m)
- Beam: 37 ft (11 m)
- Draft: 9 ft 6 in (2.90 m) standard; 11 ft 3 in (3.43 m) full load
- Propulsion: 2 × boilers; General Electric turbo-electric drive; 12,000 shp (8.9 MW); 2 × solid manganese-bronze 3,600 lb (1,600 kg) 3-bladed propellers, 8 ft 6 in (2.59 m) diameter, 7 ft 7 in (2.31 m) pitch; 2 × rudders; 359 tons fuel oil
- Speed: 23 knots (43 km/h; 26 mph)
- Range: 3,700 nmi (6,900 km) at 15 kn (28 km/h; 17 mph); 6,000 nmi (11,000 km) at 12 kn (22 km/h; 14 mph)
- Complement: 15 officers, 198 men
- Armament: 3 × 3"/50 caliber guns; 1 × quad 1.1"/75 caliber gun; 8 × single 20 mm guns; 1 × triple 21-inch (533 mm) torpedo tubes; 1 × Hedgehog anti-submarine mortar; 8 × K-gun depth charge projectors; 2 × depth charge tracks

USS Witter (DE-636), a Buckley-class destroyer escort of the United States Navy, was named in honor of Ensign Jean C. Witter (1921–1942), who was killed in action aboard the heavy cruiser San Francisco during the Naval Battle of Guadalcanal on the night of 12–13 November 1942.

Witter was laid down on 28 April 1943 at San Francisco, California, by the Bethlehem Steel Company, launched on 17 October 1943, sponsored by Mrs. Jean C. Witter, and commissioned on 29 December 1943.

== Service history ==
=== To the Gilbert and Solomon Islands ===
Witter departed San Francisco on 18 January 1944 and began her shakedown training. During that cruise, she visited San Diego and then underwent post-shakedown repairs at the Mare Island Navy Yard before returning to San Francisco at the end of February. On 8 March, she stood out of San Francisco and steamed, via Pearl Harbor, to the Gilbert Islands, arriving in Majuro lagoon on 22 March. She departed Majuro on 26 March and after side visits to Makin, Tarawa, and Abemama in the Gilberts, she arrived in Espiritu Santo on 3 April. There she remained for 12 days, escorting ships into and out of the harbor at Espiritu Santo. On 15 April, the destroyer escort stood out of Segond Channel to rendezvous at sea with SS William Charlie Yeager and escort that ship to the southern Solomons. They reached Tulagi on 21 April, and while the merchantman put into Tulagi Witter moved on to Purvis Bay at Florida Island.

=== New Guinea ===
On 25 April 1944, Witter departed the southern Solomons in company with Task Unit (TU) 34.9.6, bound for Cape Gloucester on the island of New Britain in the Bismarck Archipelago. She arrived in Borgen Bay near Cape Gloucester on 28 April and remained until 1 May when she accompanied TU 34.9.6 to the Russell Islands subgroup of the Solomons. She arrived in the Russells on 3 May, but departed that same day for her primary theater of operations for the next 10 weeks, the island of New Guinea. On 5 May, she entered Milne Bay at the southeastern tip of New Guinea. By the time Witter reached that port, American forces had already made almost simultaneous landings at Aitape, Tanahmerah Bay, and Humboldt Bay, in actions known collectively as the Operations Reckless and Persecution. Thus, for the next several weeks, Witter drew duty escorting resupply and reinforcement convoys to the three landing areas, making stops at such intermediary places as Cape Cretin and Cape Sudest. After 17 May assault on the Toem–Wakde–Sarmi area located a little farther up the northern coast of New Guinea, she added that region to her itinerary. At the end of the first week in July, Biak Island, located off the northern coast of New Guinea, opposite the large bay which separates the Vogelkop from the rest of the island, came within Witter's sphere of operations.

=== The northern Solomons ===
In mid-month, however, the destroyer escort left New Guinea for the northern Solomons. She departed Humboldt Bay on 15 July 1944 and, after a brief stop at Cape Cretin, arrived in the northern Solomons at Empress Augusta Bay, Bougainville, on 18 July. On 20 July, she departed Empress Augusta Bay and, that same afternoon, arrived in the Treasury Islands subgroup. For almost three weeks, she remained in the vicinity of Blanche Harbor in the Treasuries, conducting anti-aircraft and anti-submarine warfare exercises.

Between 9 and 12 August 1944, she voyaged back to New Guinea, stopping at Finschhaven and Langemak Bay before returning to Blanche Harbor on 12 August and resuming her exercise schedule in the Treasuries. On 21 August, she began a move farther north in the Solomons, arriving in the Green Islands subgroup that same day. Three days later, she moved on again, this time to Manus in the Admiralty Islands where she stopped overnight on 26–27 August. On the latter day, the warship made the brief voyage from Manus to Emirau Island. She remained there for almost a month, putting to sea only once during that period, between 19 and 22 September, to rescue the crew of a downed PBJ (the Navy version of the Army's B-25 Mitchell bomber).

After returning the rescued aircrewmen to Emirau on 22 August 1944, she returned to sea that same day on her way back to Manus. From there, she continued her voyage toward Milne Bay on 24 September. On 26 September, she paused near Porlock and Cape Nelson to help SS Richard H. Dana, aground on Curtis Reef. While her boats assisted in the transfer of Army troops from the merchantman to the transport Stratford (AP-41), Witter patrolled to seaward to protect against possible enemy submarine attack. On 27 September, she resumed her voyage and arrived in Milne Bay that same day.

=== The Philippines ===
Between 29 September and 6 October 1944, Witter made a roundabout voyage from Milne Bay via Treasuries and back to New Guinea at Humboldt Bay. At Humboldt Bay, she reported for duty to TU 77.7.1 for the Leyte operation. Her task unit, a part of the 7th Fleet Service Force, departed Humboldt Bay on 12 October to take up replenishment station at sea some 180 miles west of the already-invested Palau Islands. At mid-month, the oilers she escorted refueled the Leyte invasion force at sea and, on 18 October, headed for the anchorage at Kossol Passage in the Palaus. After two days in the Palaus, Witter and her charges got underway to join the main force in Leyte Gulf. They arrived in the gulf three days after 20 October assault.

The warship's visit to Leyte proved to be lively. Air attacks by the Japanese abounded. During one attack in the early evening of 24 October, a Japanese torpedo bomber started a run on Witter from almost dead ahead while she was maneuvering to change anchorages just south of Samar Island. Though it appeared to be hit by her 20-millimeter fire, the plane traversed her entire length to starboard and finally burst into flames some 300 to 400 yards astern.

The air attacks continued intermittently the following day, and Witter observed many bogeys and picked up others on her radar but contributed no more downed aircraft to the American tally. For the remainder of her stay in Leyte Gulf, Witter and the oilers she screened continued underway to avoid numerous air attacks and conduct refueling operations.

On 27 October 1944, she escorted the unit out of Leyte Gulf en route to a position about 120 miles east of Leyte. Sporadic air attacks continued but diminished as Leyte receded astern. On 28 October, her charges began refueling TG 77.4 and, just before noon the following day, completed those operations and set course for Kossol Passage. They arrived in the Palaus late on 31 October but, after the oilers refueled that night and the following morning, headed back to Leyte early in the afternoon of 1 November. On 3 November, however, they reversed course on orders and reentered Kossol Passage the following day. The stay proved brief. She and her charges set sail again that evening and arrived in San Pedro Bay, Leyte, on the 7th. She remained there, harassed by alerts but not by attacks, until the 11th when she departed, escorting the oilers. On 14 November, Witter and her charges arrived back in Humboldt Bay.

She was anchored in Humboldt Bay until 2 December 1944 when she got underway in the escort of a convoy bound for Seeadler Harbor at Manus. Witter and her charges entered the harbor the following day, and the destroyer escort remained there until mid-month, conducting tactical exercises in the vicinity until her departure. Between 15 and 23 December, she made a round-trip voyage from Manus to Ulithi and back. Following an availability and more exercises at Manus during the last week of 1944 and the first week of 1945, she repeated her voyage to Ulithi and back between 6 and 14 January 1945. Another such run late in the month was followed by an availability at Manus which included a period in drydock. During February 1945, she made two voyages from Manus, one to Majuro between 5 and 20 February, and the other to Humboldt Bay between 21 and 23 February.

=== The Mariana Islands and Okinawa ===
On 28 February 1945, Witter stood out of Seeadler Harbor, bound for the Central Pacific. Steaming first to Ulithi, where she joined a convoy headed for the Marianas, the warship arrived at Guam on 7 March. After three days of patrols around Guam and Saipan, she departed the Marianas to return to Ulithi to prepare for the invasion of Okinawa. The destroyer escort entered the lagoon at Ulithi on the 11th and spent the next 10 days patrolling the anchorage and its entrances. On 21 March, she stood out of Ulithi with Task Force 54 (TF 54), bound for the Ryukyu Islands and the last great amphibious operation of World War II. On 25 March she rendezvoused with a minesweeping unit about six miles south of Okinawa and began screening it as well as the heavy units of Admiral Oldendorf's TF 54 bombardment group, while both performed their preliminary functions.

For the next 12 days, Witter performed her anti-submarine screening duties for various units of the fleet off Okinawa. Though subjected to intermittent air attack and forced to witness several kamikaze and Shinyo motorboat suicide attacks, she escaped unscathed until 6 April. Her primary duty throughout the period remained anti-submarine patrols at various points around the island of Okinawa. During that time, she made several sonar contacts but made no depth charge attacks.

=== Hit by a Kamikaze ===
At about 16:11 on the afternoon of 6 April 1945, while off the southeastern coast of Okinawa, she sighted two enemy aircraft about eight miles distant approaching her from the south-southwest. The warship went to general quarters, rang up 23 knots, and began radical maneuvers to evade them. Within five minutes, both Japanese planes showed smoke, evidence of hits registered by her guns. One of the intruders splashed into the sea, but his colleague pressed home his own attack and crashed into Witter at the waterline on the starboard side at frame number 57. His bomb exploded in the number 1 fireroom, opening that and several other compartments to the sea. Six crew members were killed.

Witter lost control briefly but from the help of Captain George "Tim" Herrmann III, it was restored again almost as quickly. Damage control took the situation well in hand, and soon Witter was proceeding under her own power at 10 knots. With the assistance of Morris (DD-417), Richard P. Leary (DD-664), Gregory (DD-802), and the tug Arikara (ATF-98), the destroyer escort limped toward Kerama Retto. Morris left the formation at 17:15, and at 18:19, also suffered a suicide crash. Richard P. Leary then also dropped out of the group to assist Morris while Arikara and Gregory continued on with Witter. The little flotilla entered the anchorage at Kerama Retto at a little after 21:30, and Arikara towed the damaged destroyer escort to a waiting berth. Witter remained at Kerama Retto until late June, undergoing temporary repairs and dodging sporadic air attacks by constantly shifting from anchorage to anchorage – a process which slowed repairs considerably.

=== Return to the United States ===
Finally, on 25 June 1945, she appeared seaworthy enough to attempt the voyage home and departed the Ryukyu Islands. Steaming by way of Saipan, Eniwetok, and Pearl Harbor, she arrived in San Diego, California, on 24 July. Two days later, she resumed her travels and headed, by way of the Panama Canal, for the East Coast of the United States. The warship arrived in the Philadelphia Navy Yard on 16 August, shortly following the cessation of hostilities. She immediately began permanent repairs and conversion to a High speed transport, which she had been so designated the day before her arrival. The end of the war, however, brought a quick halt to her conversion. On 22 August, the work, hardly begun, was ordered stopped. She was assigned to the Atlantic Reserve Fleet at Philadelphia on 1 September and was decommissioned there on 22 October 1945. Because of the extent of damage and the excess of ships of her type, she was deemed to be excess to fleet needs.

Her name was struck from the Navy List on 16 November 1945, and almost 13 months later on 2 December 1946, her hulk was sold to the Northern Metals Company of Philadelphia.

== Awards ==
Witter earned two battle stars during World War II.

== Sources ==
=== News ===
- "Lt. Hoxsie Griswold Officer On Vessel Surviving Hits". The Southwest Wave. 7 October 1945. p. 18 – via Newspapers.com.
- "Escort Destroyer Christened For Ensign Dean Witter". Martinez News-Gazette. 15 October 1943. p. 1 – via Newspapers.com.

=== Websites ===
- "USS Witter (DE 636)". NavSource.
- "Jean Carter Witter, Ensign, USN". USS San Francisco Memorial Foundation.
- "Witter (DE-636)". Naval History and Heritage Command. 30 April 2016.
