= USS Mazama =

US Navy ammunition ship

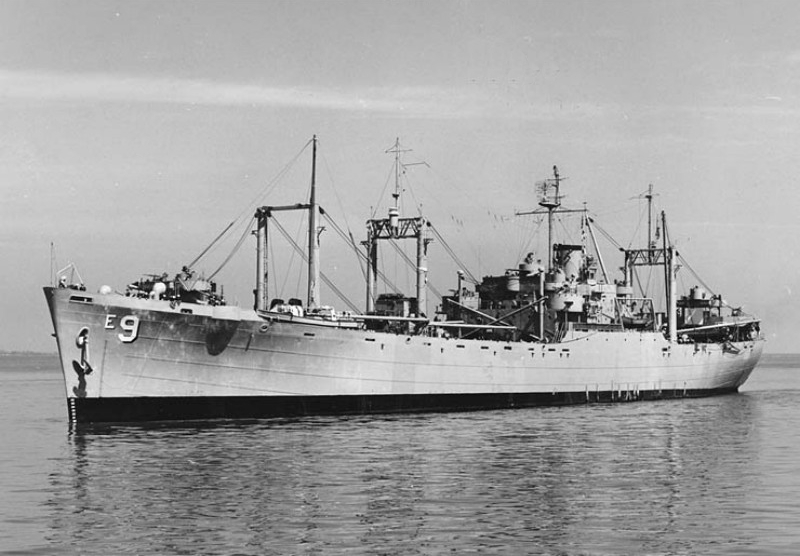
- USS Mazama AE-9

History

United States
- Name: USS Mazama (AE-9)
- Namesake: Mount Mazama
- Launched: 15 August 1943
- Commissioned: 10 March 1944; 24 April 1952; 27 November 1961
- Decommissioned: 3 August 1946; 1 June 1957; May 1970
- Stricken: 1 September 1970
- Fate: Scrapped 1973

General characteristics
- Class & type: Lassen-class ammunition ship
- Displacement: Light: 6,350 tons; Full load:13,855 tons
- Length: 459 ft (140 m)
- Beam: 63 ft (19.2 m)
- Draught: 25 ft 11 in (7.9 m)
- Propulsion: 2 x 9 cyl. Nordberg diesel engines each with 3155 brake horsepower at 225 rpm geared to 1 shaft
- Speed: 16 knots (30 km/h)
- Capacity: 5,000 deadweight tons
- Complement: 280 officers and enlisted
- Armament: 1 × single 5 in (127 mm) 38 caliber gun; 4 × single 3 in (76 mm) 50 caliber guns; 2 × twin 40 mm guns; 8 × twin 20 mm guns

USS Mazama (AE‑9) was a US Navy ammunition ship laid down 14 April 1942 by the Tampa Shipbuilding Co., Tampa, Fla.; launched 15 August 1943; sponsored by Mrs. Edward V. Rickenbacker; and commissioned 10 March 1944. She was named for Mount Mazama, a collapsed volcano in the Cascade Range in Oregon whose caldera is now occupied by Crater Lake.

== Service ==
Mazama built as an ammunition ship using C‑2 hull plans, began her war service 6 May 1944. On that date, having filled her holds with high explosives, she departed Boston for the Pacific. Arriving at Majuro 4 June, she immediately assumed her dangerous, but extremely vital, mission of receiving and delivering ammunition to ships at sea and in port. She remained at Majuro through 12 June; thence proceeding via Eniwetok to Saipan, arriving 21 June, just after the Battle of the Philippine Sea. She continued on in support of Saipan‑Tinian operations, rearming units of the 5th Fleet, including renowned Fast Carrier Task Force 58, until 11 July. Mazama sailed for San Francisco 4 August, arriving on the 24th and departing again on 19 September for the combat area.

=== Liberation of the Philippines ===
Anchoring at Manus on 9 October, the ammunition ship prepared for the liberation of the Philippines. She steamed on the 15th for Kossol Roads, continuing on to Leyte Gulf, arriving 23 October 3 days after the Leyte landings. She remained in the gulf, in spite of intense and bitter air activity, through the battles off Samar and in Surigao Strait. Following these battles she rearmed the units of the 7th and 3rd Fleets.

On 1 November, Mazama departed for Kossol Roads and Ulithi Atoll. While at anchor in the latter, 20 November, she witnessed the first successful attack of the kaiten. By 1 December she was beaded for Espiritu Santo to replenish her cargo; returning to Ulithi 5 January 1945. There, at 0650 12 January, a suspicious object was sighted off the starboard quarter. Four minutes later an explosion rocked the ship. Mazama had been struck by a Kaiten manned torpedo launched by Japanese submarine I-36. She developed a 2° list to port and was down at the head. Pumps were immediately started to counteract flooding, later ballast was emptied to reduce the forward draft which had increased to 35 from 23 feet; the change in draft aft, from 25 to 21 feet. By midafternoon, having suffered the loss of eight men, one dead and seven seriously injured, she began to transfer serviceable ammunition; unserviceable munitions were dumped at sea.

The next day the caulking and plugging of open seams was begun. Temporary repairs completed by 6 March, Mazama steamed for San Francisco, arriving 4 April. She then headed back toward the Philippines 9 June with 5,000 tons of ammunition. On 2 July she entered San Pedro Bay where she remained through the end of the war.

=== Decommissionings and recommissionings ===
On 19 August she rendezvoused off the Japanese coast with TG 30.8 whose units were under orders to stand by until the signing of the official surrender document. She then returned to the Philippines, discharging remaining cargo, and sailed to the United States, arriving 23 November at Seattle to prepare for inactivation and transfer to the Pacific Reserve Fleet. On 12 April 1946 she steamed to San Diego where she decommissioned 3 August.

Mazama recommissioned 24 April 1952 and was assigned to Service Force, Atlantic Fleet. For the next five years she operated off the east coast with annual deployments with the 6th Fleet. During her 1956 Mediterranean deployment (1 May to 11 October) she was part of the logistics force in the eastern part of that sea as the crisis over Egyptian nationalization of the Suez Canal heightened. The crisis erupted in late October into armed conflict between Israel, the United Kingdom, France, and Egypt. Following her return to the east coast, Mazama decommissioned 10 June 1957 at Orange, Texas, where she remained as a unit of the 16th Fleet until 1961.

On 27 November 1961 Mazama again recommissioned. Home ported at Mayport, Florida for the next four years, she participated in fleet exercises along the Atlantic seaboard and in the Caribbean. During fall 1962 exercises in the latter area she was called on to support the ships enforcing the Cuban quarantine. In 1964 she was again deployed to the Mediterranean, where during a rearming of the Roosevelt CVA 42 and the USS Mazama AE 9 there was a collision, only one sailor was injured, Seaman Albert with a concussion during the collision. There was severe damage to the Mazama and she was transported to Roto Spain for repairs. During the month of August, she stood by in support of the Cyprus patrol as civil unrest and fighting between Greek and Turkish Cypriots threatened an uneasy peace in the eastern Mediterranean.

Mazama returned to Florida 23 December to operate out of Mayport until August 1965. On 20 August she moored at Davisville, Rhode Island, her new home port. Her deployment schedule was also changed and the next year she was assigned to the 7th Fleet.

Departing Davisville 17 March 1966, she arrived at Subic Bay 5 May and for the next six months supported units of the 7th Fleet in operations off the coast of Vietnam. On 3 November Mazama was relieved by Shasta. She then headed back to Davisville via the Suez Canal, completing her round‑the‑world cruise 20 December.

After a cruise to the Mediterranean in late 1967 through early 1968, Mazama returned to operate with and supply ammunition to the 2d Fleet into 1969. In March 1969 she departed for the Panama Canal to start a Western Pacific cruise that lasted to November 1969 with a full ships' complement arriving April 1969 in Subic Bay. Upon return to Davisville she was permanently decommissioned in 1970.

== Awards and honors ==
Mazama received five battle stars for actions in the Pacific Theater of Operations at Guam, The Philippine Campaign, Saipan, Tinian, Okinawa. The Mazama was also part of the American Occupational Force of the Japanese Home Islands following the end of World War II.
