= USS Ashtabula =

Oiler of the United States Navy

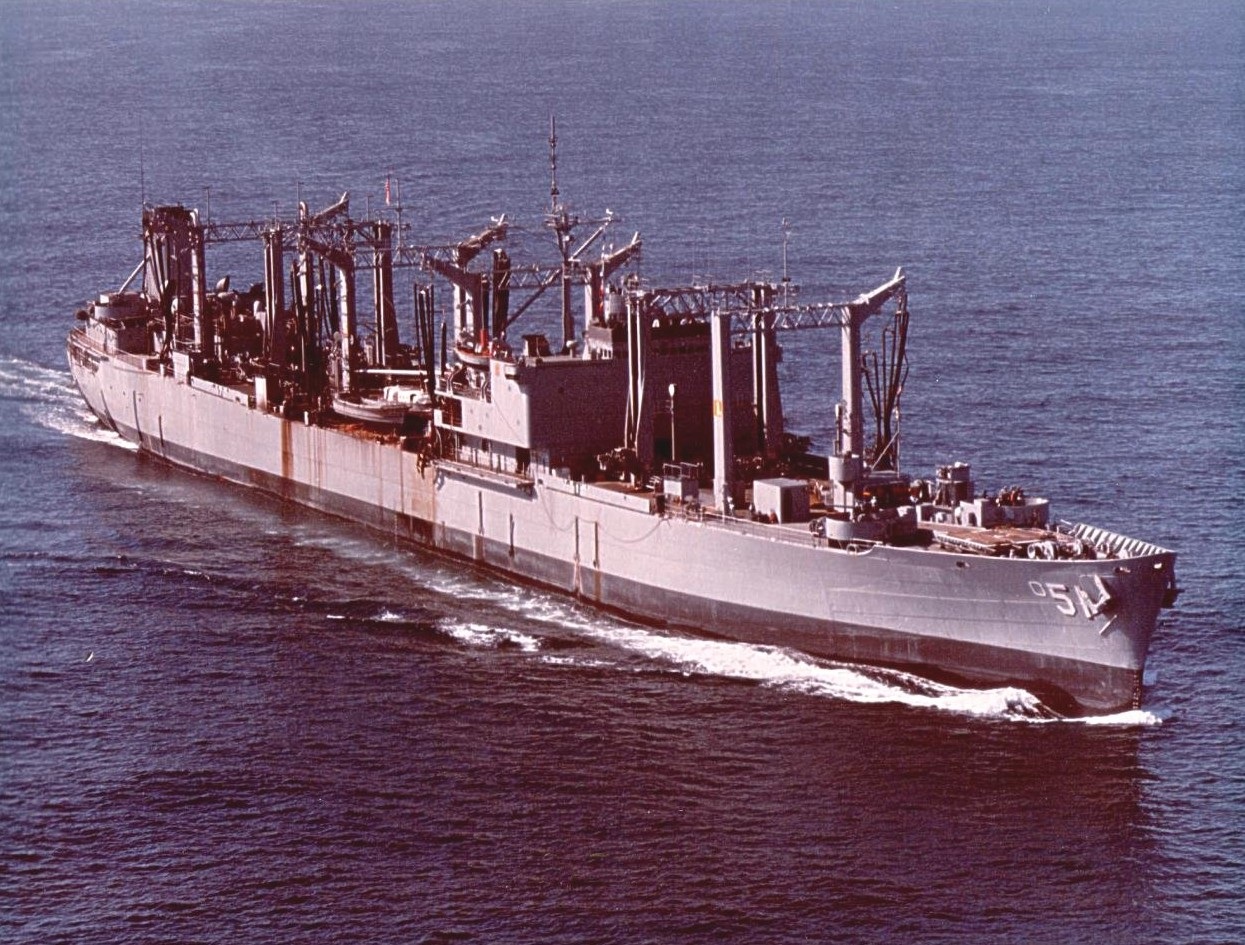
- USS Ashtabula after the jumboization

History

United States
- Name: USS Ashtabula
- Namesake: The Ashtabula River in Northeast Ohio
- Ordered: as T3-S2-A1 tanker hull; MC hull 717
- Laid down: 1 October 1942
- Launched: 22 May 1943
- Acquired: 7 August 1943
- Commissioned: 7 August 1943
- Decommissioned: 30 September 1982
- Stricken: 6 September 1991
- Home port: Long Beach, California Pearl Harbor, Hawaii
- Honors and awards: Eight battle stars for World War II service; Four battle stars for Korean War service; Eight campaign stars for Vietnam War service
- Fate: Partially scrapped 1995, expended as SINKEX target ship, 15 October 2000
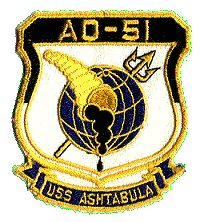
- Badge

General characteristics
- Class & type: Cimarron-class replenishment oiler
- Displacement: 7,470 t.(lt) 25,450 t.(fl) as built 16,500 t. (lt) 36,500 t.(fl) Jumboized
- Length: 553 ft (169 m) as built 664 ft (202 m) Jumboized
- Beam: 75 ft (23 m)
- Draught: 32 ft 4 in (9.86 m)
- Propulsion: four Foster Wheeler boilers, steam turbines, twin screws. 13,500shp
- Speed: 18 knots (33 km/h).
- Complement: 19 Officers, 284 Enlisted
- Armament: four single 5 in (130 mm) dual purpose gun mounts; four single 40 mm AA gun mounts; four twin 40 mm AA gun mounts; eight single 20 mm guns AA gun mounts

USS Ashtabula (AO-51) was a Cimarron-class fleet oiler of the United States Navy in service from 1943 to 1991. She survived three wars and was awarded eight battle stars for World War II service, four battle stars for Korean War service, and eight campaign stars for Vietnam War service. In the mid-1960s Ashtabula became the lead ship of her class, when she and seven other Cimarron-class oilers were lengthened ("jumboized"). She has been the only U.S. Navy ship to bear the name Ashtabula, after the Ashtabula River in northeast Ohio.

== History ==
=== World War II ===
Ashtabula (AO-51) was laid down under a Maritime Commission contract (MC hull 717) on 1 October 1942 at Sparrows Point, Maryland, by the Bethlehem Steel Co.; launched on 22 May 1943; sponsored by Mrs. Adolph Augustus Berle Jr., the wife of the Assistant Secretary of State; and acquired by the Navy on 7 August 1943; and commissioned the same day.

Following shakedown in the Chesapeake Bay, the oiler sailed for Aruba on 10 September to take on fuel oil and aviation gasoline and then continued on, via the Panama Canal, to the South Pacific. After arriving at Tutuila, Samoa, on 22 October, she operated as a member of Service Squadron (ServRon) 8 in the South Pacific until 17 November. Ashtabula next sailed for the United States and entered the Long Beach Navy Yard on 1 December for an availability period.

The oiler sailed for Pearl Harbor on New Year's Day, 1944, and remained there until 16 January when she sortied with Task Group (TG) 58.1 for operations supporting the occupation of the Marshall Islands. Ashtabula anchored at Majuro lagoon on 4 February and operated from that atoll in support of the fast carrier task forces through mid June. The ship then began participating in the effort to take the Marianas. During the Battle of the Philippine Sea and its aftermath, she fueled ships of Task Force 58 (TF 58) from 20 through 27 June and then retired, via Eniwetok, to the California coast for yard work which began upon her arrival at Terminal Island on 15 July.

The oiler got underway again on 28 August and arrived at Pearl Harbor on 4 September. She continued sailing westward and reached Eniwetok on the 17th. After a two-day respite, the vessel headed for the South Pacific and arrived at Purvis Bay on the 24th where she spent the remainder of the month in fueling duties.

Ashtabula's next assignment was to support the first American forces to fight for the liberation of the Philippines. She sailed, via Humboldt Bay and Kossol Roads, to Leyte Gulf and began fueling units of TG 77.2 on 23 October. Late the following afternoon, three Japanese torpedo planes attacked the oiler. One of them dropped a torpedo which hit Ashtabula's port side. Although the explosion caused no fires or personnel casualties, Ashtabula soon developed a 16-degree list to port. Skillful counter-flooding righted the ship and allowed her to resume operations. On 27 October, the vessel was detached from Task Unit (TU) 77.7.1 and headed for the west coast of the United States. Following stops at Kossol Roads, Humboldt Bay, and Pearl Harbor, she reached San Pedro, Los Angeles, on 15 December and was drydocked at Terminal Island for repair of her torpedo damage.

The oiler departed the California coast on 28 January 1945, touched at Pearl Harbor on 3 February, and arrived at Eniwetok on 12 February. She reported to ServRon 10 for duty and remained there until 5 March, when the ship sailed for Ulithi. On 10 March, Ashtabula was reassigned to ServRon 6; and, three days later, she got underway for fueling operations at sea for the warships of the Fast Carrier Task Force, TF 58.

On 5 April, Ashtabula's bow struck the destroyer-seaplane tender Thornton (AVD-11) amidships and caused considerable damage to the tender. Ashtabula returned to Ulithi on 9 April and underwent minor repair work from 10 to 17 April. There, the oiler once again returned to the control of ServRon 10.

For the duration of the war, Ashtabula operated in the Ulithi area. In mid-August, Japan capitulated; and, on the last day of the month, the oiler headed for Okinawa, but soon moved on to Jinsen, Korea, where she arrived on 11 September. For the next six months, Ashtabula operated between ports in Korea, Japan, and China while supplying and fueling American warships. In March 1946, the oiler made a cruise, via Singapore and Ceylon, to Bahrain. She returned to Japan in April. In June and July, she again visited a Mideastern port, Ras Tanura, Saudi Arabia, to replenish her oil bunkers. Ashtabula got underway for a voyage back to the United States. After pausing briefly at Pearl Harbor, the ship arrived at San Pedro, California, on 18 December.

Ashtabula began 1947 with a cruise to Guam and returned to California on 27 January. For the next two years, she continued operations between the west coast, Hawaii, and the Marshall Islands. This circuit was interrupted by a visit to Ras Tanura and Bahrain in June 1949. The oiler returned to the Orient in October 1948 and once again operated between the west coast and Hawaii from July 1949 until June 1950. During this time, she provided towing services from Pearl Harbor to southern California ports in addition to transporting fuel. On 28 June 1950, Ashtabula headed north from Long Beach, California, bound for Alaska. Upon arriving at Dutch Harbor, the ship fueled two survey vessels operating in the area. After a brief stop in Point Barrow, Alaska, she returned to Long Beach on 19 August.

=== Korean War operations ===
The vessel lay at anchor there until 27 September, when she sailed for Pearl Harbor with a load of aviation gasoline and fuel oil. Due to the growing Korean War, Ashtabula was ordered to proceed immediately to Sasebo, Japan. There, she loaded provisions for American troops stationed in Taiwan, and then delivered them to Keelung. Beginning in November, Ashtabula put to sea to supply fuel and provisions to ships of the U.S. 7th Fleet. She continued these activities until August 1951, when she returned to Long Beach.

The ship got back in action in the Far East in November, refueling bombardment forces around the 38th parallel and, later, assisted in the evacuation of Hungnam, Korea. In March 1952, she sailed to Long Beach for an overhaul, but was back at Sasebo by early October.

On 30 November 1952, while in Sasebo for an availability, Ashtabula was damaged by twin explosions caused by acetylene torches which ignited gasoline fumes in her forward hold. Three sailors were killed, and the forward well deck was seriously damaged. After three months of work at Sasebo, the ship sailed to Long Beach for further alterations. In September 1953, she returned to the western Pacific (WestPac) and resumed replenishment duties.

For the next 10 years, the oiler continued alternating deployments to WestPac with periods of upkeep, overhaul, and training at her home port, Long Beach. Ports of call in WestPac included Subic Bay and Manila, Philippines; Hong Kong; Sasebo, Kobe, Nagasaki, Yokosuka, and Kagoshima, Japan; Kaohsiung, Taiwan, and Buckner Bay, Okinawa.

During the first half of 1964, Ashtabula continued her peacetime routine. On 2 August, she was in the Gulf of Tonkin refueling destroyers Maddox and Turner Joy just a few hours after North Vietnamese torpedo boats attacked Maddox. She spent most of August fueling ships of the 7th Fleet in the South China Sea. Upon completing her WestPac cruise, Ashtabula returned to Long Beach.

=== Vietnam War operations ===
For the next eight years, the oiler continued to serve in waters surrounding Vietnam during her regular deployments to the Far East. She provided fuel and supplies to units of the 7th Fleet, while operating out of the ports of Subic Bay and Kaohsiung. Between tours in the Orient, she returned to Long Beach for leave and upkeep.

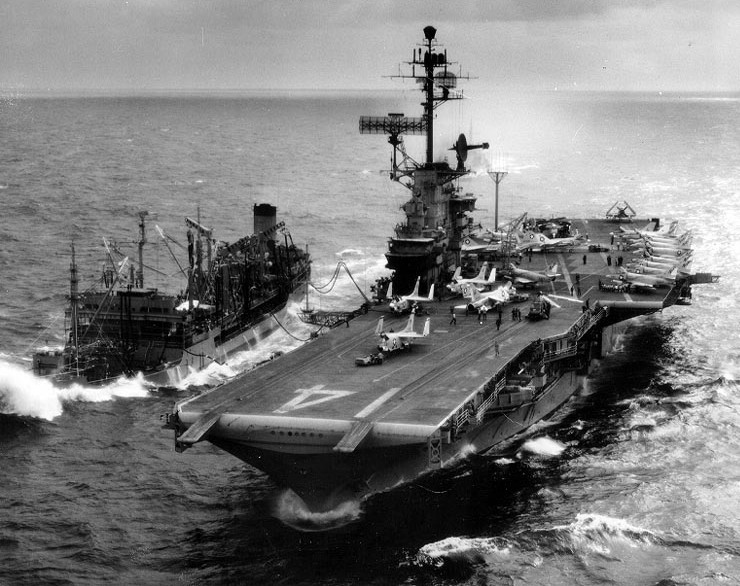
USS Asthabula refueling the carrier USS Ticonderoga off Vietnam in 1966.

In 1968, Ashtabula underwent a major reconfiguration, or Jumboization at Todd Shipyards, Los Angeles Division, San Pedro, California. A 400-foot (120 m) midsection, built entirely new from the keel up, was inserted and welded between her original bow and stern. This replaced the old 310-foot (94 m) midsection and increased the vessel's liquid cargo capacity by over one-third. Her new configuration closely resembled that of a more modern type of ship, the replenishment oiler. She continued her Vietnam service through August 1972, when she made her last line swing off Vietnam. The ship returned to Long Beach on 9 December.

Following an availability period at Long Beach and training exercises off the southern California coast, Ashtabula once again sailed west on 4 October 1973. While at Subic Bay, she received orders to proceed to the Indian Ocean operating area. In early December, Ashtabula provided services to aircraft carriers USS Hancock and USS Oriskany as well as other members of their task groups. After 51 continuous days at sea, Ashtabula arrived at Subic Bay on 5 January 1974.

Following a brief availability there, the oiler got underway to replenish a group of amphibious ships in the Gulf of Siam. On 7 March, she began a three-week voyage to her home port. She spent one month in upkeep, then sailed to her new home port, Pearl Harbor, Hawaii, and spent the rest of the year in overhaul and refresher training.

Ashtabula began another WestPac deployment on 8 February 1975. She took part in Operation Seafox, a joint SEATO exercise with six other nations. Her next assignments were Operation Eagle Pull and Operation Frequent Wind, held off the coast of Vietnam. On 11 May, she was ordered to Cambodia to support the rescue of SS Mayaqüez, an American merchant ship that had been captured by communist forces. In late July, the oiler returned to her home port, where she spent the next 10 months in upkeep and local operations.

Ashtabula sailed for WestPac on 21 June 1976. Ports visited included Subic Bay; Sasebo and Yokosuka, Japan; Hong Kong; and Keelung, Taiwan. The cruise was highlighted by a joint training exercise with ships of the Japanese Maritime Self-Defense Force. The oiler arrived at Pearl Harbor on 15 December and spent the first two months of 1977 providing services to ships in the Pearl Harbor area. In March, she headed west to rendezvous with and refuel a task group built around the aircraft carrier Coral Sea. On 2 April, the ship returned to Pearl Harbor and commenced an overhaul period which was completed on 28 February 1978.

Ashtabula sailed to Alameda, California, on 10 March to hold a series of qualification trials, returned to Pearl Harbor on 14 April, and began refresher training. She got underway on 30 June for the Far East and called at Song Kla and Pattaya, Thailand; Subic Bay; Sasebo; and Fremantle, Australia. While in Australia, Ashtabula participated in Exercise "Sandgroper," which was held in conjunction with the Australian and New Zealand navies. The oiler then proceeded to Singapore and Hong Kong for liberty calls and closed the year in upkeep at Guam.

Back at Pearl Harbor on 18 January 1979, Ashtabula began eight months of underway training, local operations, and inspections. At the end of August, she embarked upon a six-week cruise to the west coast to conduct underway replenishment qualification trials and then participate in Exercise "Kernel Potlatch II," a joint United States-Canadian operation to test and evaluate plans for the common defense of North America. At the conclusion of the exercise, the oiler called at Esquimalt, British Columbia, on 6 October. After a three-day visit, she headed back to Hawaii on the 9th and arrived in Pearl Harbor on the 16th.

Local operations in the Hawaiian Islands occupied Ashtabula's time for nearly the entire first nine months of 1980. On 28 September, the oiler embarked upon another tour of duty in the western Pacific. Steaming by way of Guam in the Mariana Islands, she entered Subic Bay in the Philippines on 15 October. Her deployment was marred at its outset by engineering casualties that required a two-month repair period at Subic Bay. On 12 December, she completed repairs and, the following day, put to sea to begin underway refueling service to the ships of the 7th Fleet. For the next four months, Ashtabula operated in the South China Sea, the East China Sea, and the Sea of Japan, refueling American warships assigned to the Far East. The oiler made visits to several Japanese ports—Sasebo, Yokosuka, and Iwakuni—as well as to Okinawa in the Ryukyu Islands and Chinhae in Korea. She also returned periodically to the base at Subic Bay. On 15 April 1981, Ashtabula departed the Philippines to return to Hawaii. She arrived in Pearl Harbor on the 30th.

=== Final operations ===
Following a two-month, post-deployment standdown, the ship resumed local operations in the Hawaiian Islands at the end of June. She remained so employed until the end of October when she stood into Pearl Harbor to conclude her last underway period for 1981. The oiler spent the first four months of 1982 carrying out missions in the Hawaiian operating area. On 30 April 1982, she embarked upon her final deployment to the Far East. That tour of duty lasted a little more than three months; she returned to Pearl Harbor on 5 August.

Soon thereafter, Ashtabula began preparations for inactivation.

=== Decommissioning and Disposal ===
Ashtabula decommissioned at Pearl Harbor on 30 September 1982. She was subsequently towed to Suisun Bay, California, where she joined the Maritime Administration's National Defense Reserve Fleet. Ashtabula was stricken from the Naval Vessel Register on 6 September 1991 and sold for scrapping in 1995. The shipbreaker, however, entered into default and Ashtabula, approximately 20% scrapped and missing her forward bow, part of the main deck forward, most of her forward superstructure and all masts and kingposts, was returned to the Navy on 27 September 1999. Ashtabula remained berthed at Mare Island Naval Shipyard until she was selected as a target ship in a SINKEX exercise on 14 October 2000. Ashtabula was subjected to eight RGM-84 Harpoon missiles, two RIM-66 Standard SAMs fired in the surface-to-surface mode, three helicopter-launched Sea Skua missiles, four Mk82 500 pound bombs, and nearly one hundred rounds of 3", 100 mm, and 5" gunfire from an armada consisting of one French, three British and three United States warships.

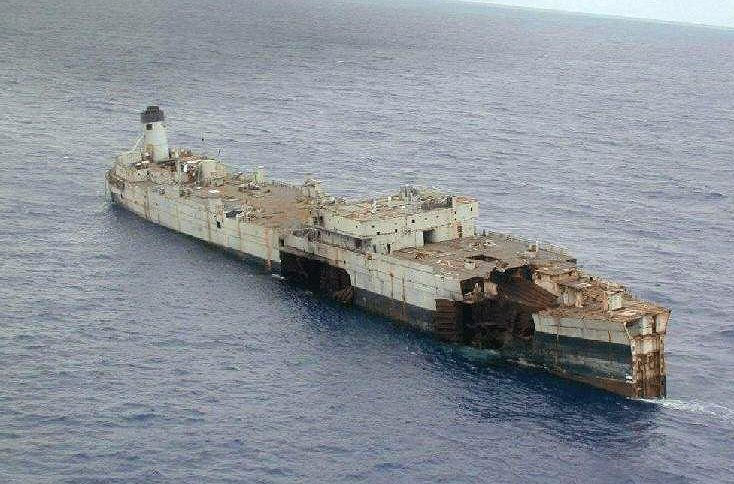
Ex-USS Asthabula as target ship, 14 October 2000.

Two Harpoon missiles and one Sea Skua missile found their marks, but Ashtabula remained afloat the next day. She was ultimately sent to the bottom after being fitted with demolition charges.

== Awards ==
Ashtabula was awarded eight battle stars for World War II service, four battle stars for the Korean War, and eight battle stars for duty in the Vietnam War.

She was awarded the:

- Navy Meritorious Unit Commendation
- American Campaign Medal
- Asiatic-Pacific Campaign Medal with 8 battle stars
- World War II Victory Medal
- Navy Occupation Service Medal (with "Asia" clasp)
- National Defense Service Medal (second)
- Korean Service Medal with 4 battle stars
- Armed Forces Expeditionary Medal (4-Quemoy-Matsu, 9-Vietnam, 1-Korea, 1-Op. Frequent Wind)
- Vietnam Service Medal with 8 campaign stars
- Humanitarian Service Medal (1-Frequent Wind, 1-Snowgo, New York)
- Sea Service Ribbon
- Philippine Liberation Medal
- United Nations Korea Medal
- Republic of Vietnam Campaign Medal
- Republic of Korea War Service Medal (retroactive)
