= List of United States Navy amphibious warfare ships =

Ships of the United States Navy

Ships in current service
- Current ships

Ships grouped alphabetically
- A–B; C; D–F; G–H; I–K; L; M; N–O; P; Q–R; S; T–V; W–Z

Ships grouped by type
- Aircraft carriers; Airships; Amphibious warfare ships; Auxiliaries; Battlecruisers; Battleships; Cruisers; Destroyers; Destroyer escorts; Destroyer leaders; Escort carriers; Frigates; Hospital ships; Littoral combat ships; Mine warfare vessels; Monitors; Oilers; Patrol vessels; Registered civilian vessels; Sailing frigates; Steam frigates; Steam gunboats; Ships of the line; Sloops of war; Submarines; Torpedo boats; Torpedo retrievers; Unclassified miscellaneous; Yard and district craft

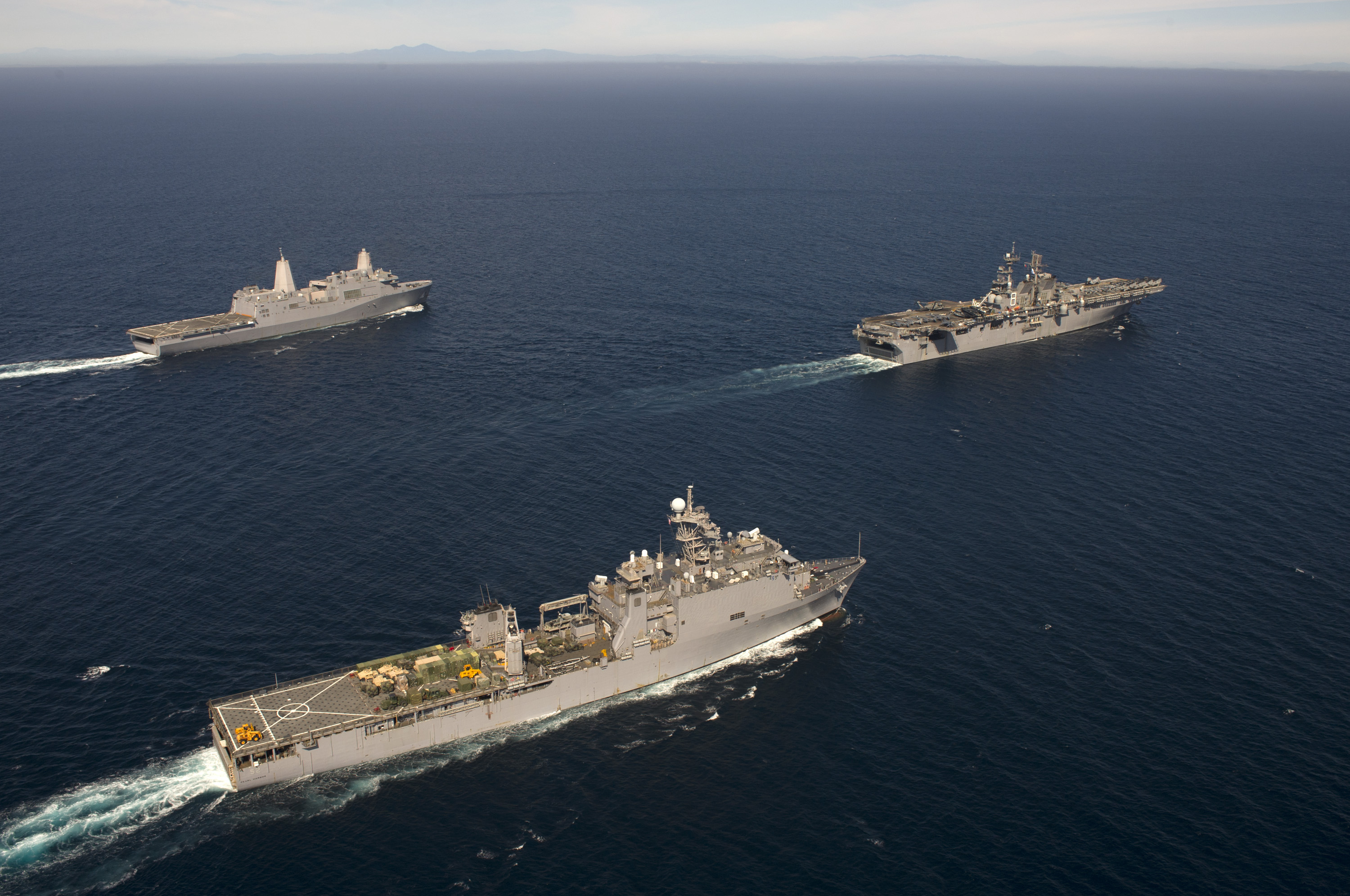
Three US amphibious warfare ships in 2011 - the Landing Helicopter Dock USS Makin Island (LHD 8) leading the Landing Platform Dock USS New Orleans (LPD 18), rear, and the Landing Ship Dock USS Pearl Harbor (LSD 52), fore

This is a list of United States Navy amphibious warfare ships. This type of ship has been in use with the US Navy since World War I.

Ship status is indicated as either currently active [A] (including ready reserve), inactive [I], or precommissioning [P]. Ships in the inactive category include only ships in the inactive reserve, ships which have been disposed from US service have no listed status. Ships in the precommissioning category include ships under construction or on order.

== Historical overview ==
There have been four generations of amphibious warfare ships, with each generation having more capability than the previous:

- The first generation simply landed troops and equipment ashore with standard (i.e., non-specialized) boats and barges. These ships are not listed in this article since they were indistinguishable from the troopships and other surface combatants of their day, and as such were not assigned specialized hull classification symbols.
- The second generation was designed during World War II to land personnel and vehicles ashore, either directly or via carried specialized landing craft.
- The third generation was designed beginning in the 1950s to use helicopters for amphibious operations, with the result that such operations were no longer limited to beaches.
- The fourth generation was designed beginning in the 1980s to use hovercraft (Landing Craft Air Cushion (LCAC) specifically), with the result that the numbers and types of beaches which could be accessed dramatically increased.

=== World War II ===
During the naval build-up for World War II, almost 200 Maritime Commission (MARCOM) standard designs were converted to US Navy amphibious warfare ships. In the Cold War these and newer standard designs were built under MARCOM's successor agency, the United States Maritime Administration (MARAD):

- 1 Type C1 ship: 1 AKA
- 101 Type C2 ships: 15 AGC, 79 AKA, 7 APA
- 16 Type C3 ships: 15 APA, 1 AKA
- 3 Type C4 ships: 1 AKA, 2 APA
- 64 Type S4 ships: 32 AKA, 32 APA
- 117 Type VC2 Victory ships: all AKA

In the following lists MARCOM types are abbreviated as 'MC type' and MARAD as 'MA type'; 'MC types' became 'MA types' in 1950.

=== Postwar ===
The first amphibious warfare ships had a top speed of 12 to 17 knots. With the appearance of higher speed submarines at the end of World War II, the US Navy decided that all new amphibious warfare ships would have to have a minimum speed of 20 knots (37 km/h; 23 mph) to increase their chances of survival. The High Speed Transport destroyer conversions (APD/LPR), the Landing Platform Docks (LPD), and all new ships with a full flight deck (LPH, LHA, LHD) would meet this criterion. The other major types would see relatively small numbers of new ships constructed with this 20 knot requirement, with the last appearing in 1969. During the 1950s and 1960s these would include the Paul Revere class amphibious transports (LPA), the Charleston class amphibious cargo ships (LKA), the Thomaston and following classes of dock landing ships (LSD), the Newport class tank landing ships (LST), and the Blue Ridge class command ships (LCC).

=== Classifications ===
Amphibious warfare ships were considered by the US Navy to be auxiliaries and were classed with hull classification symbols beginning with 'A' until 1942. Many ships were reclassed at that time as landing ships and received new hull symbols beginning with 'L'; others would retain 'A' hull symbols until 1969 and then receive 'L' symbols. This article pairs the two lists of what are the same ships, with each 'L' list preceding the respective 'A' list. Littoral Combat Ships also use 'L' hull symbols but are not solely intended for amphibious warfare.

In 2015 the US Navy created new hull classification symbols that began with an 'E' to designate 'expeditionary' vessels. Expeditionary vessels are designed to support low-intensity missions, allowing more expensive, high-value amphibious warfare ships to be re-tasked for more demanding missions. Most of these ships are not commissioned warships, but rather are operated by the Military Sealift Command.

== Amphibious assault ship (General Purpose) (LHA) ==
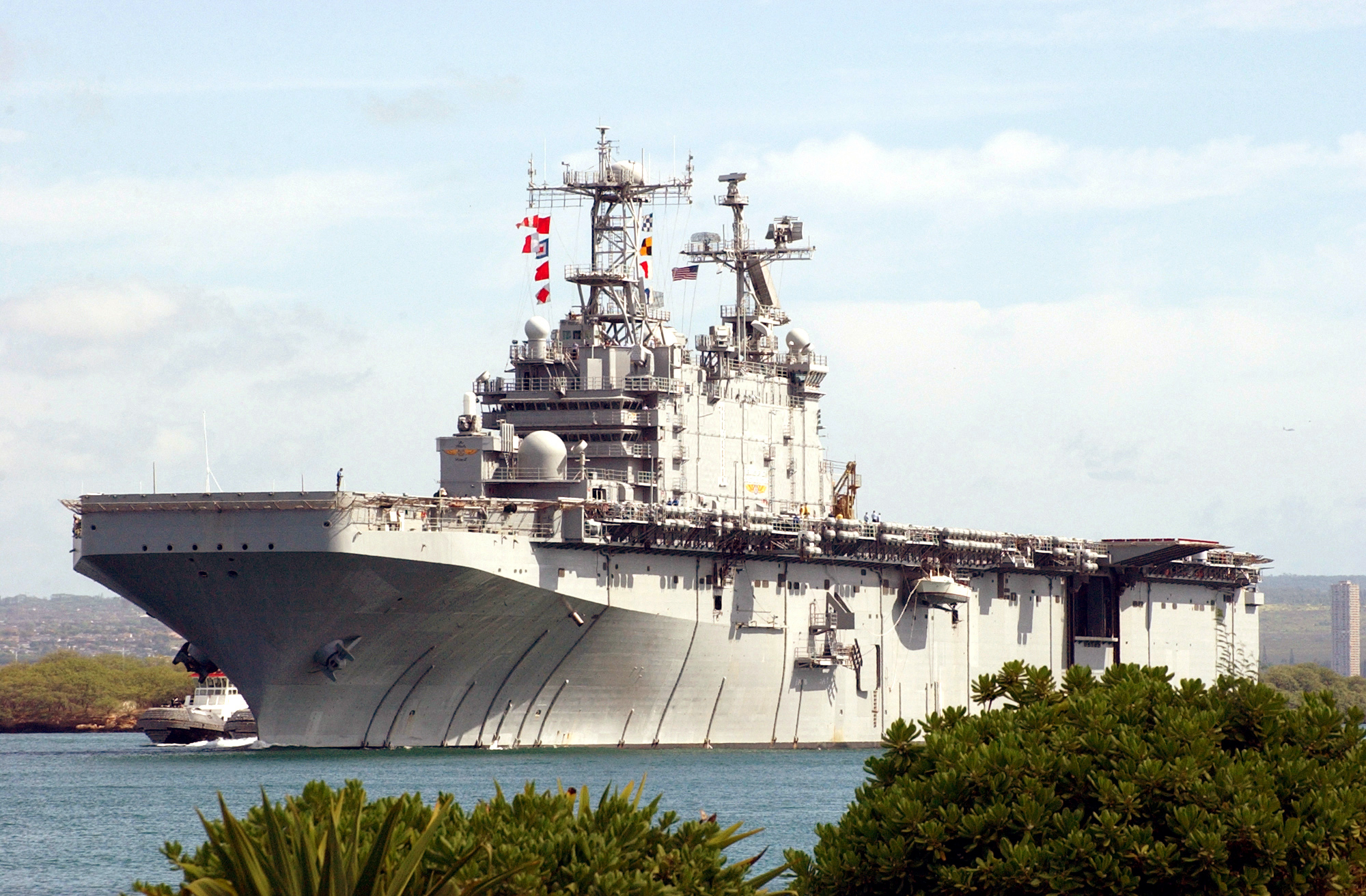
USS Tarawa (LHA 1)

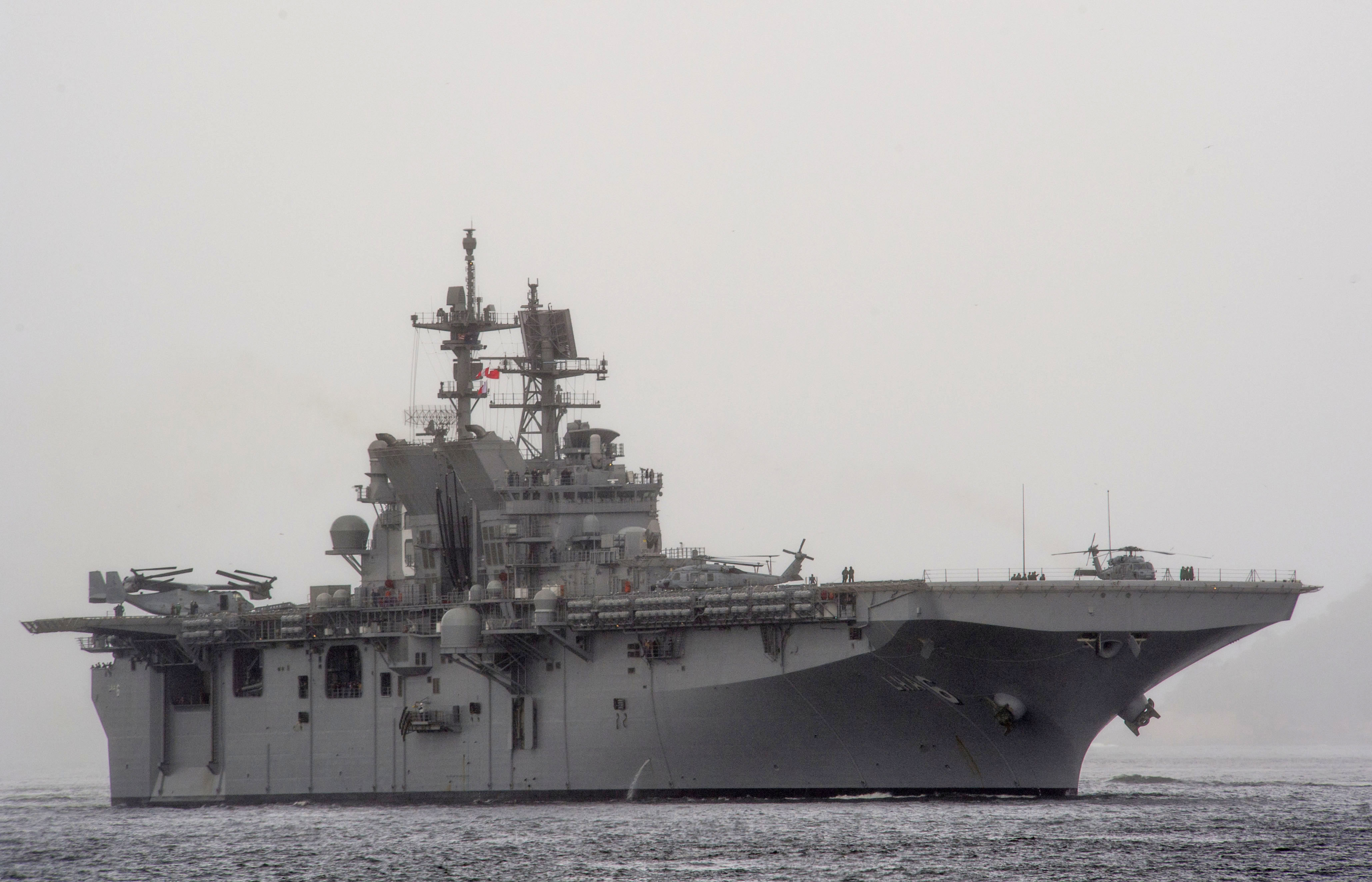
USS America (LHA-6)

Tarawa class

The Tarawa-class LHA was the first to combine the features of the well deck of the Landing Ship Dock (LSD) or Landing Platform Dock (LPD) and the full flight deck of the Landing Platform Helicopter (LPH) into one ship. Though not designed to carry Landing Craft Air Cushion (LCAC)s, they could accommodate one in their well decks.

- USS Tarawa (LHA-1)
- USS Saipan (LHA-2)
- USS Belleau Wood (LHA-3)
- USS Nassau (LHA-4)
- USS Peleliu (LHA-5)

America class

The America-class LHA would be a follow-on to the Wasp-class LHD. The first two ships, America and Tripoli, would not have a well deck, so as to dedicate more space to the support of air operations. This was criticized as a repeat of the mistakes of the LPH concept, and so it was decided that Bougainville and all future ships of this class would have a well deck.

- USS America (LHA-6) [A]
- USS Tripoli (LHA-7) [A]
- USS Bougainville (LHA-8) [P]
- USS Fallujah (LHA-9) [P]
- USS Helmand Province (LHA-10) [P]

== Amphibious assault ship (multi-purpose) (LHD) ==
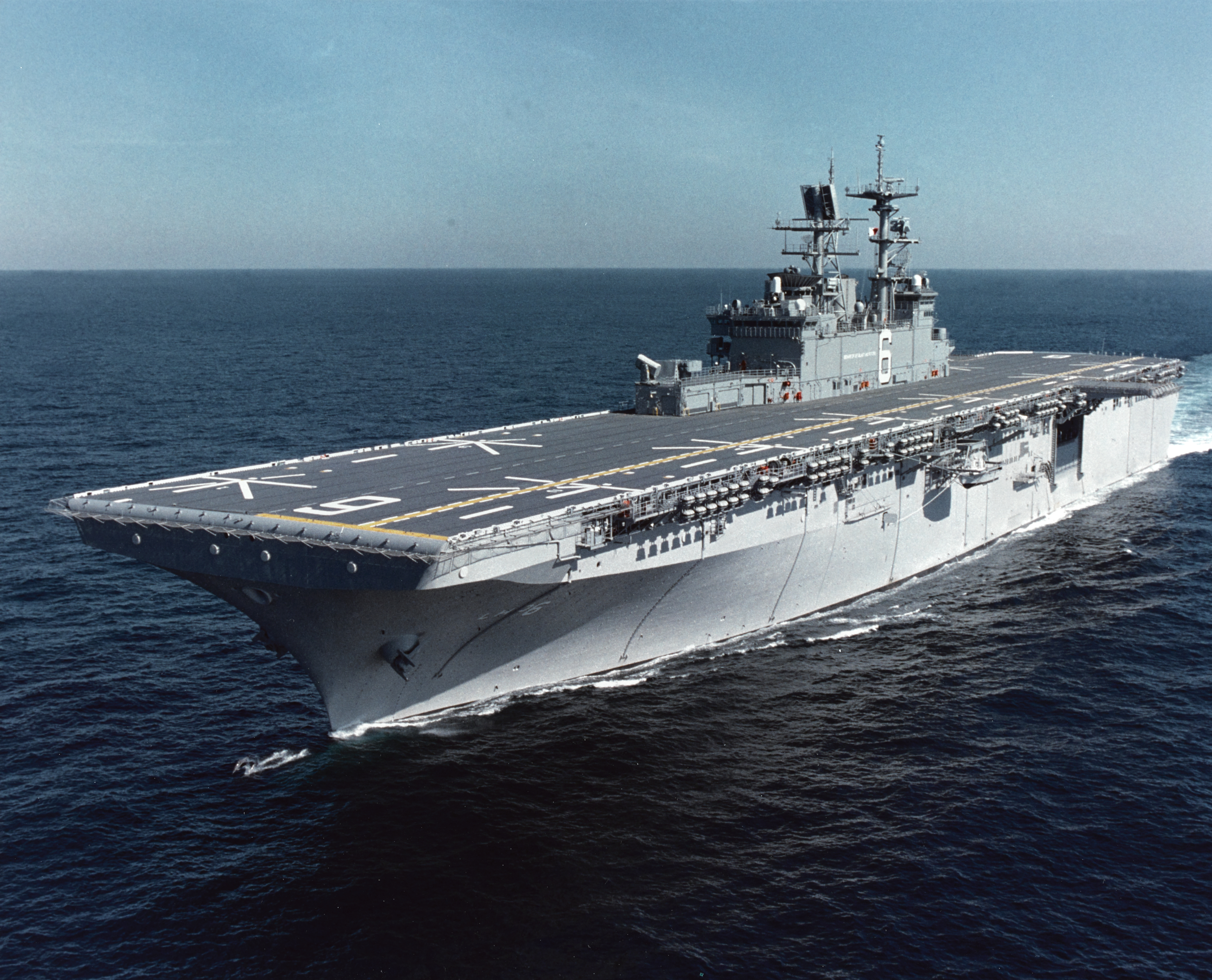
USS Bonhomme Richard (LHD-6)

Wasp class

The well deck of the Tarawa-class LHA was not designed to accommodate the LCAC, which came into service just six years after the last of that class was completed. The Wasp-class LHD and the later units of the America-class LHA were designed to be LCAC compatible; the Wasp-class could carry 3 LCACs.

- USS Wasp (LHD-1) [A]
- USS Essex (LHD-2) [A]
- USS Kearsarge (LHD-3) [A]
- USS Boxer (LHD-4) [A]
- USS Bataan (LHD-5) [A]
- USS Bonhomme Richard (LHD-6), scrapped after a 12 July 2020 pierside fire
- USS Iwo Jima (LHD-7) [A]
- USS Makin Island (LHD-8) [A]

== Landing Platform Helicopter (LPH) ==
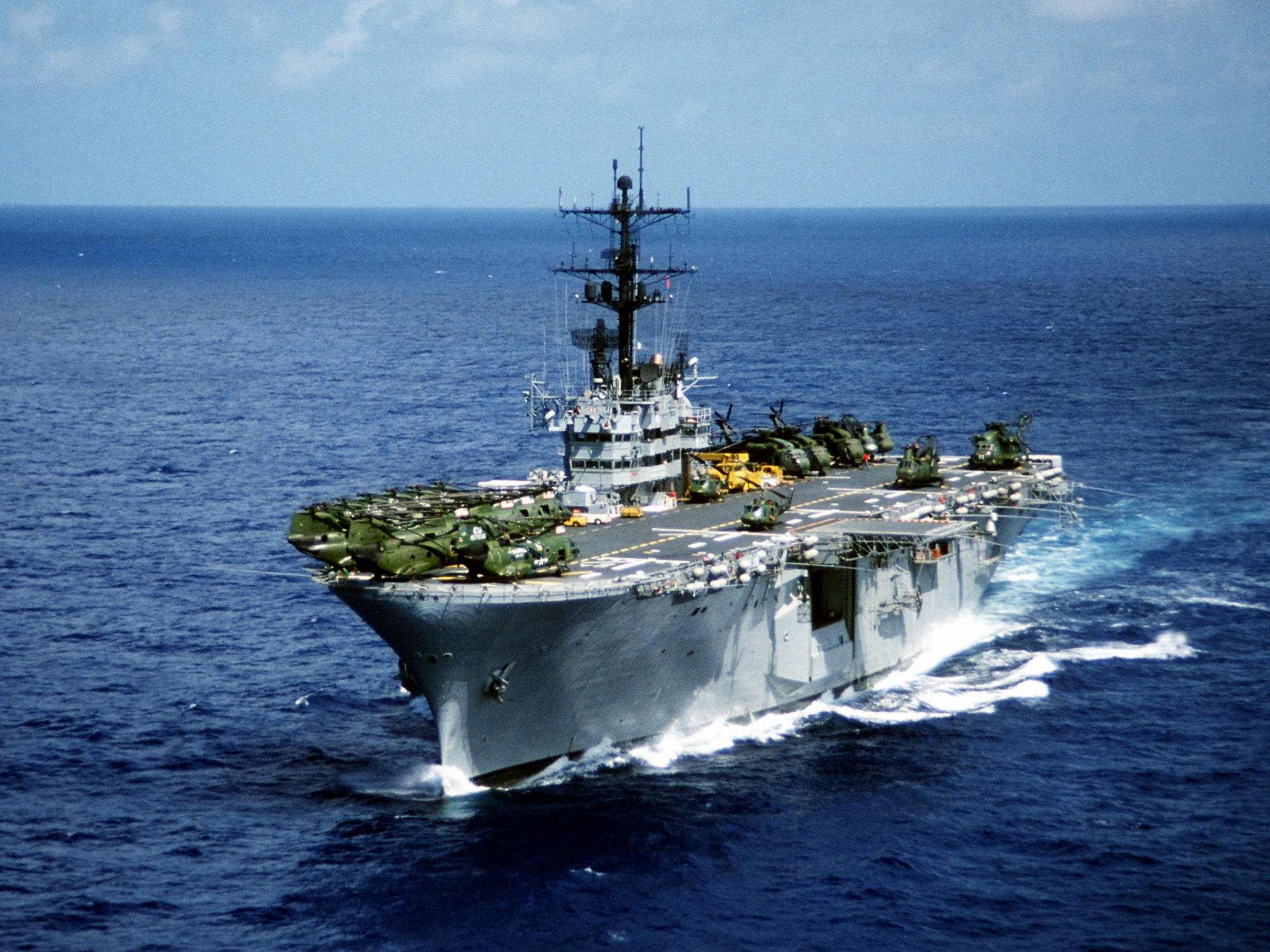
USS Iwo Jima (LPH-2)

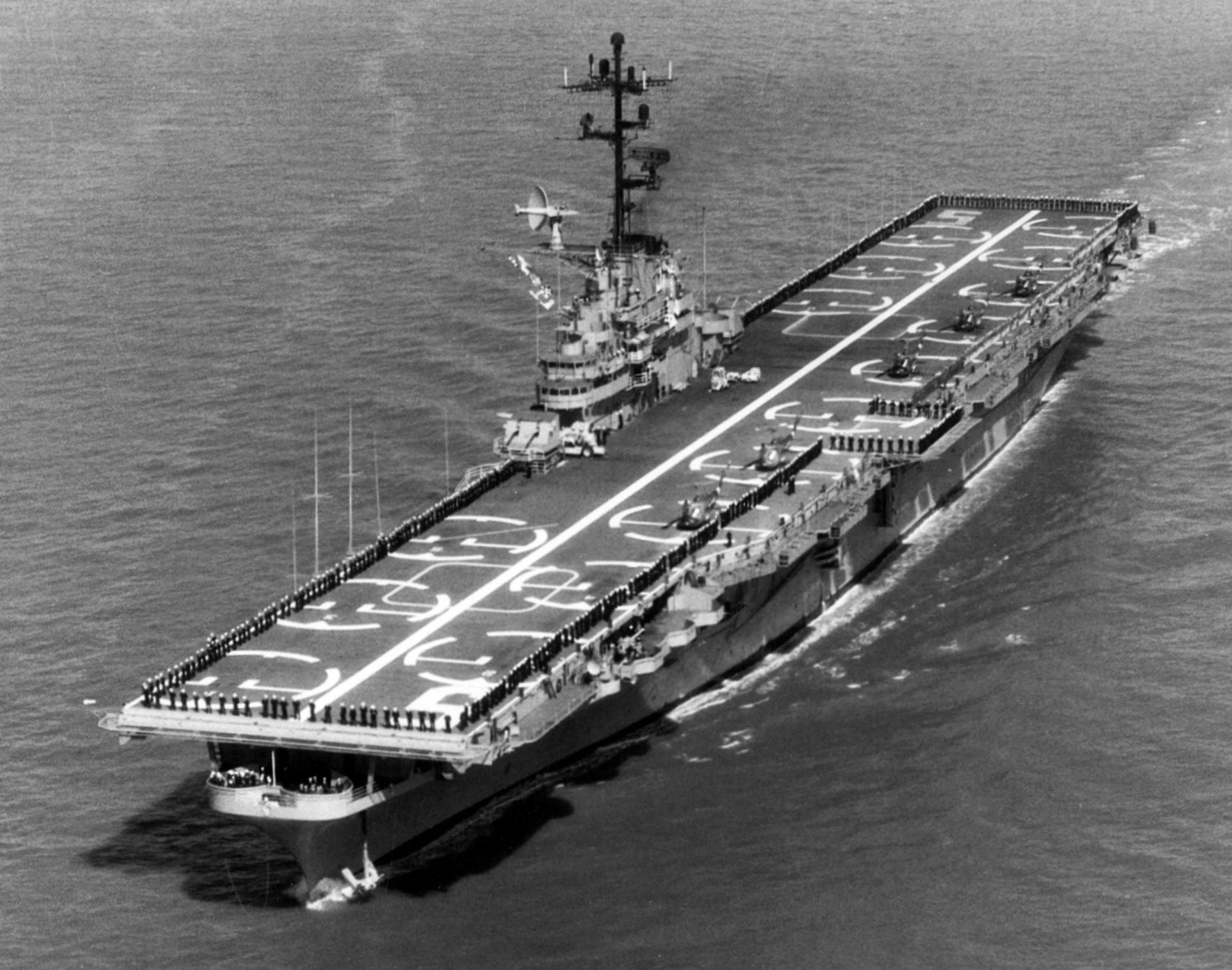
USS Princeton (LPH-5)

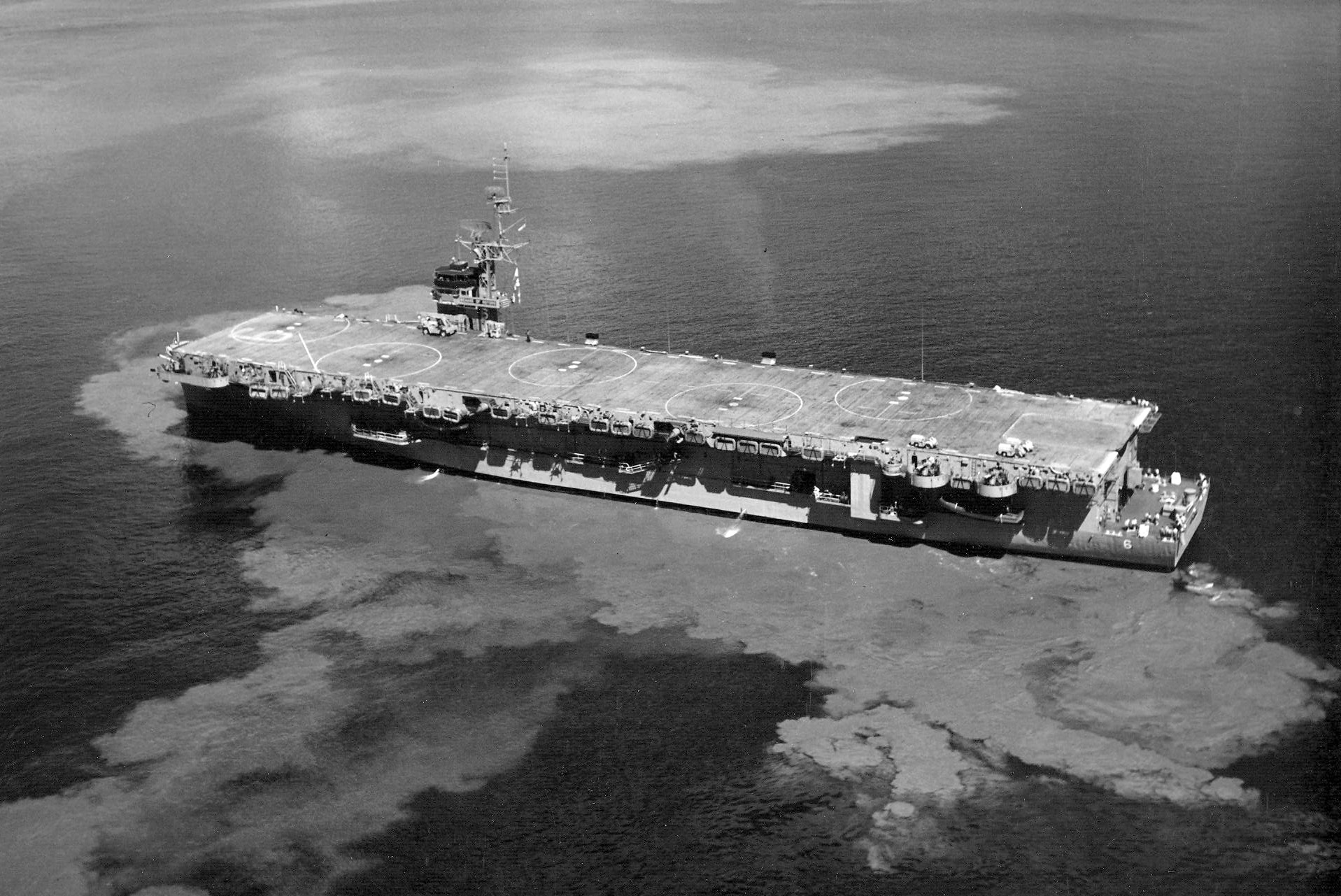
Thetis Bay (LPH-6)

The Landing Platform Helicopter (LPH) would be the first ships to operate helicopters for large scale air assault behind beaches. One major defect of the LPH concept was that these ships did not carry landing craft to disembark Marines when weather or hostile anti-aircraft systems grounded helicopters; only Inchon would be modified to carry two landing craft. In such situations the LPH would be reliant on landing craft supplied by other ships, which proved awkward in practice. This defect would drive the design of the Tarawa-class LHA, in effect a LPH with a well deck.

Commencement Bay class: MC type T3

- USS Block Island (LPH-1), ex-CVE-106, conversion under project SCB 159 canceled

Iwo Jima class

As the 'definitive' LPH design under project SCB 157, the Iwo Jima class would be the only class to be built as such, with sufficient 'hotel' accommodations for the embarked Marines. All other LPH ships would be conversions of aircraft carriers, and so had accommodation deficiencies (for example, some Marine units could not bunk together, and water evaporation was insufficient to allow all personnel showers within a 24 hour period).

After their retirement as amphibious warfare ships, one (Inchon) would be converted to carry minesweeping helicopters as a mine countermeasures support ship (MCS). All of these ships would be scrapped or sunk as targets by 2018.

- USS Iwo Jima (LPH-2), Operation Dominic nuclear test participant
- USS Okinawa (LPH-3)
- USS Guadalcanal (LPH-7)
- USS Guam (LPH-9)
- USS Tripoli (LPH-10)
- USS New Orleans (LPH-11)
- USS Inchon (LPH-12), later MCS-12

Essex class

The following LPH ships were converted Essex class aircraft carriers, due to budget constraints with the construction of the Iwo Jima class ships.

- USS Boxer (LPH-4), ex-CV-21
- USS Princeton (LPH-5), ex-CV-37, Operation Dominic participant
- USS Valley Forge (LPH-8) ex-CV-45

Casablanca class: MC type S4-S2-BB3

Thetis Bay was a converted Casablanca class escort carrier. Under the hull designation CVHA-1, she was the prototype for the LPH concept.

- USS Thetis Bay (LPH-6), ex-CVE-90, CVHA-1

== Landing Platform Dock (LPD) ==
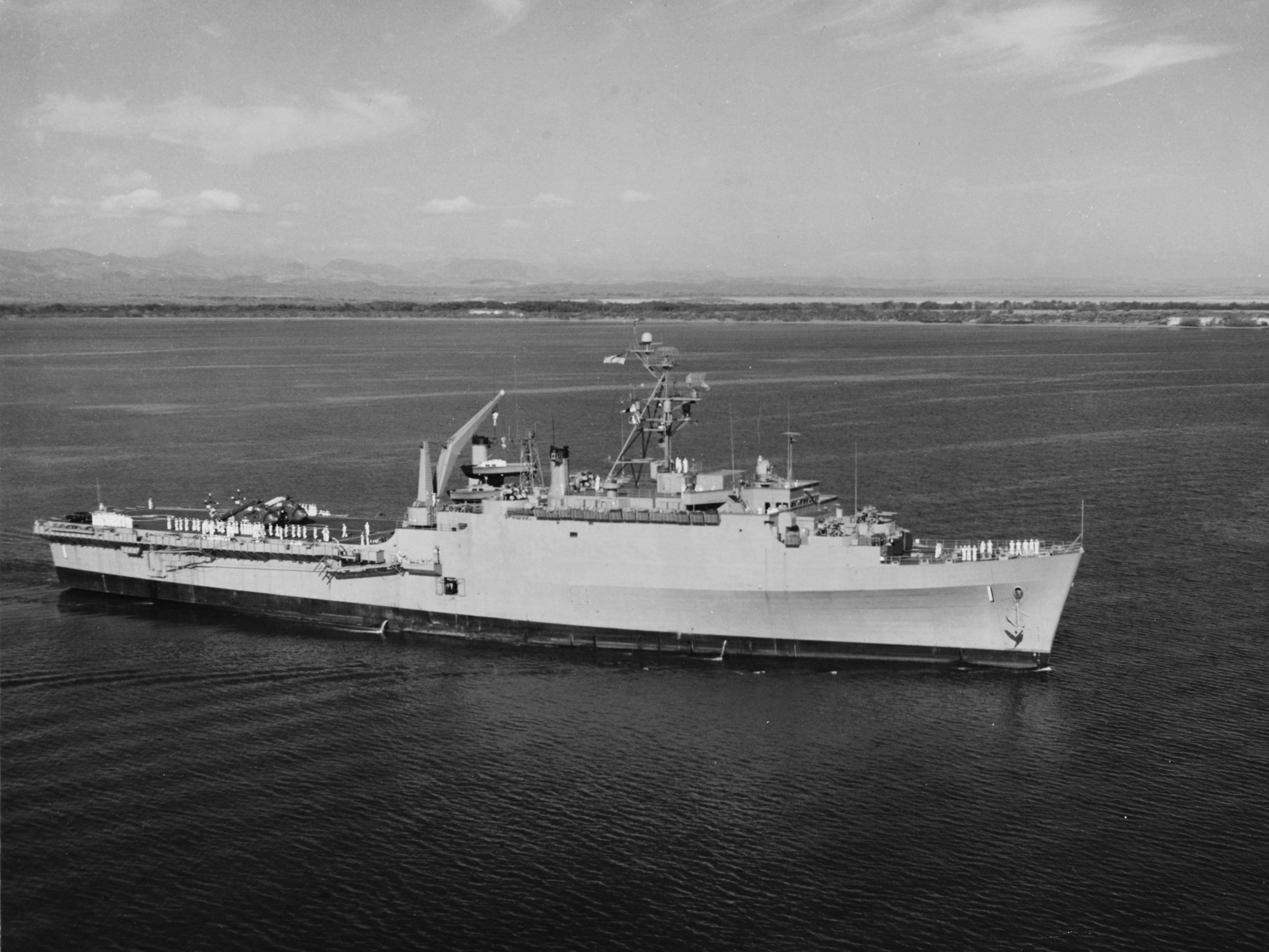
USS Raleigh (LPD-1)

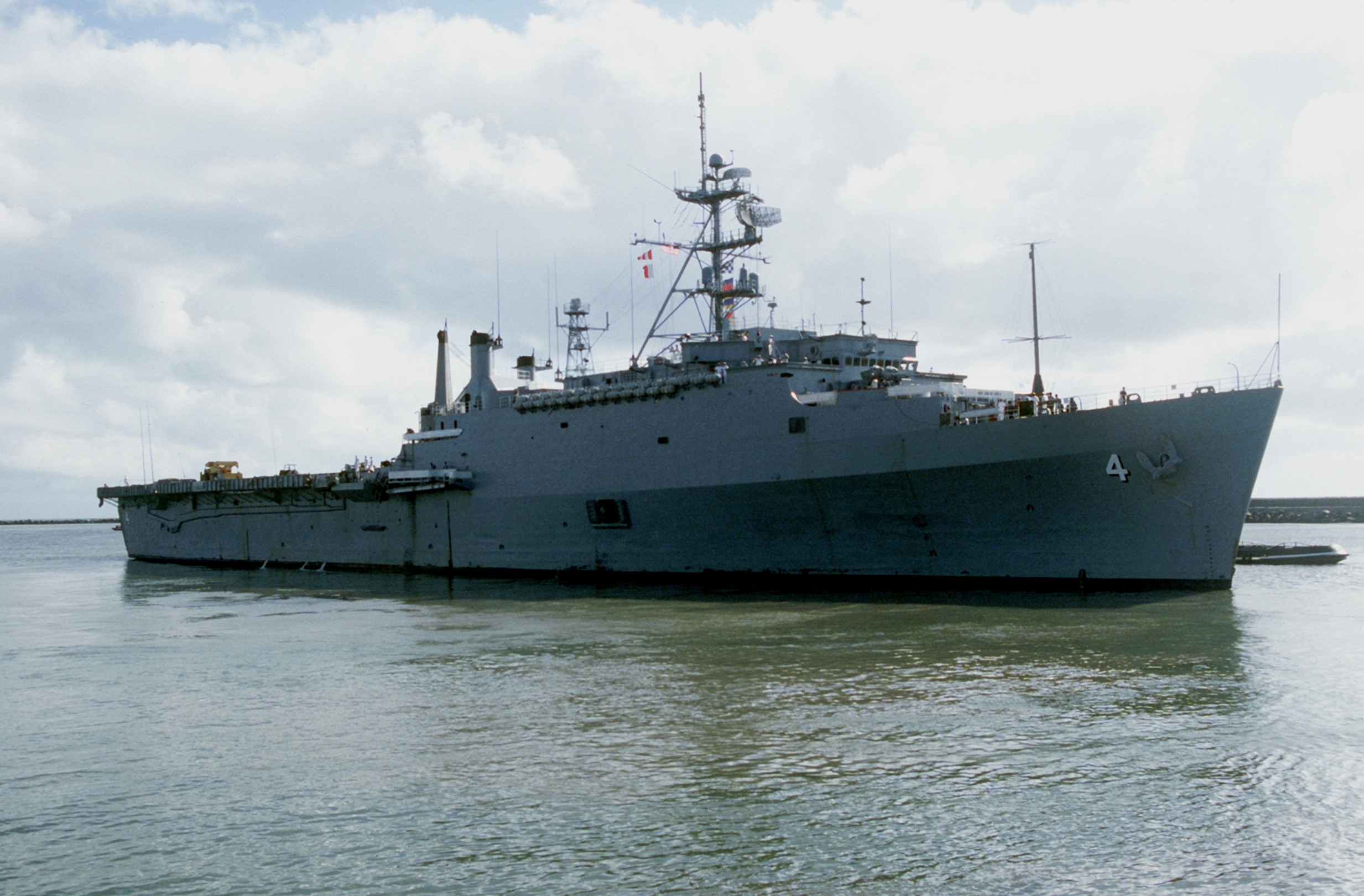
USS Austin (LPD-4)

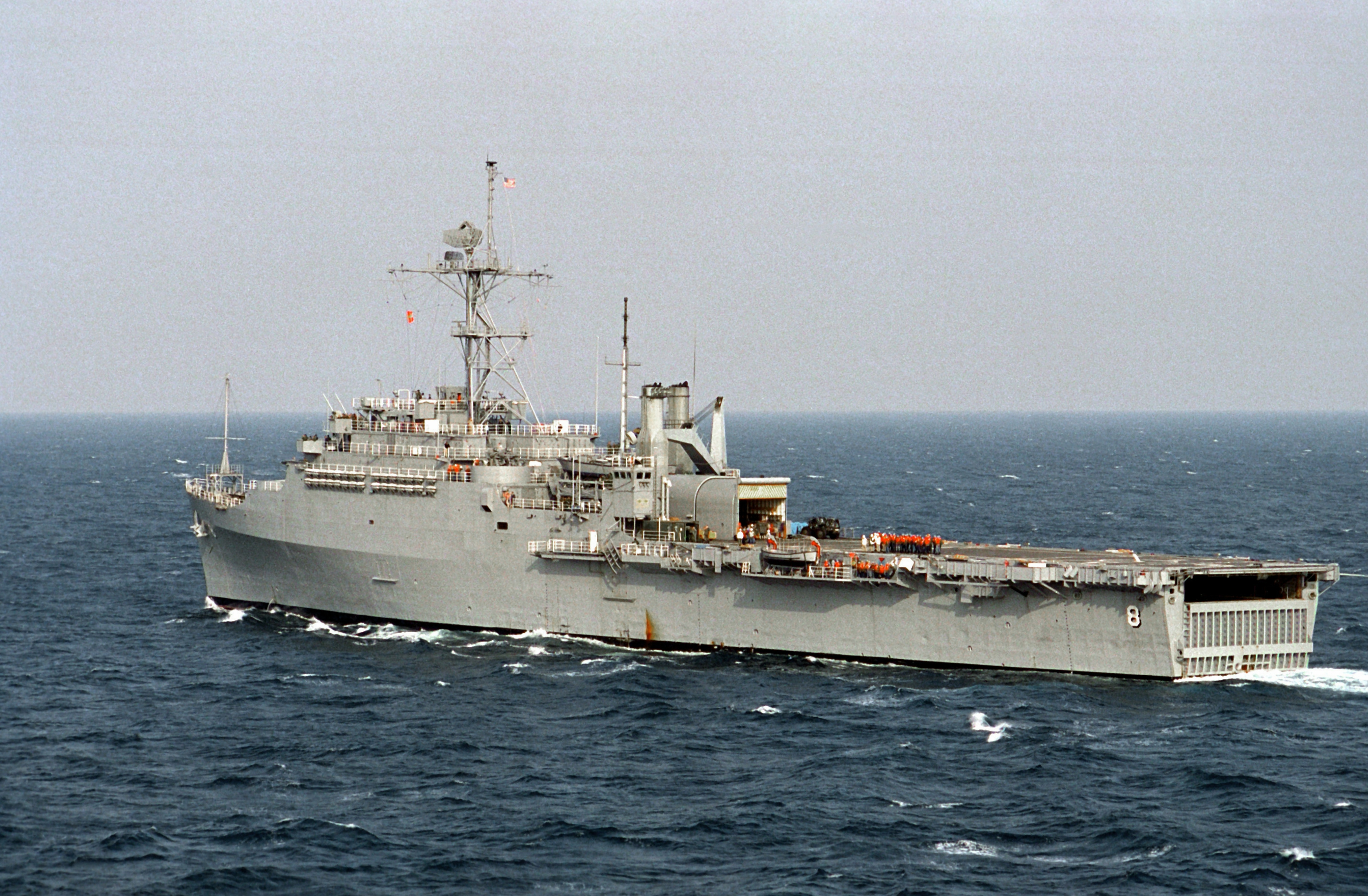
USS Dubuque (LPD-8), note temporary telescoping helicopter hangar

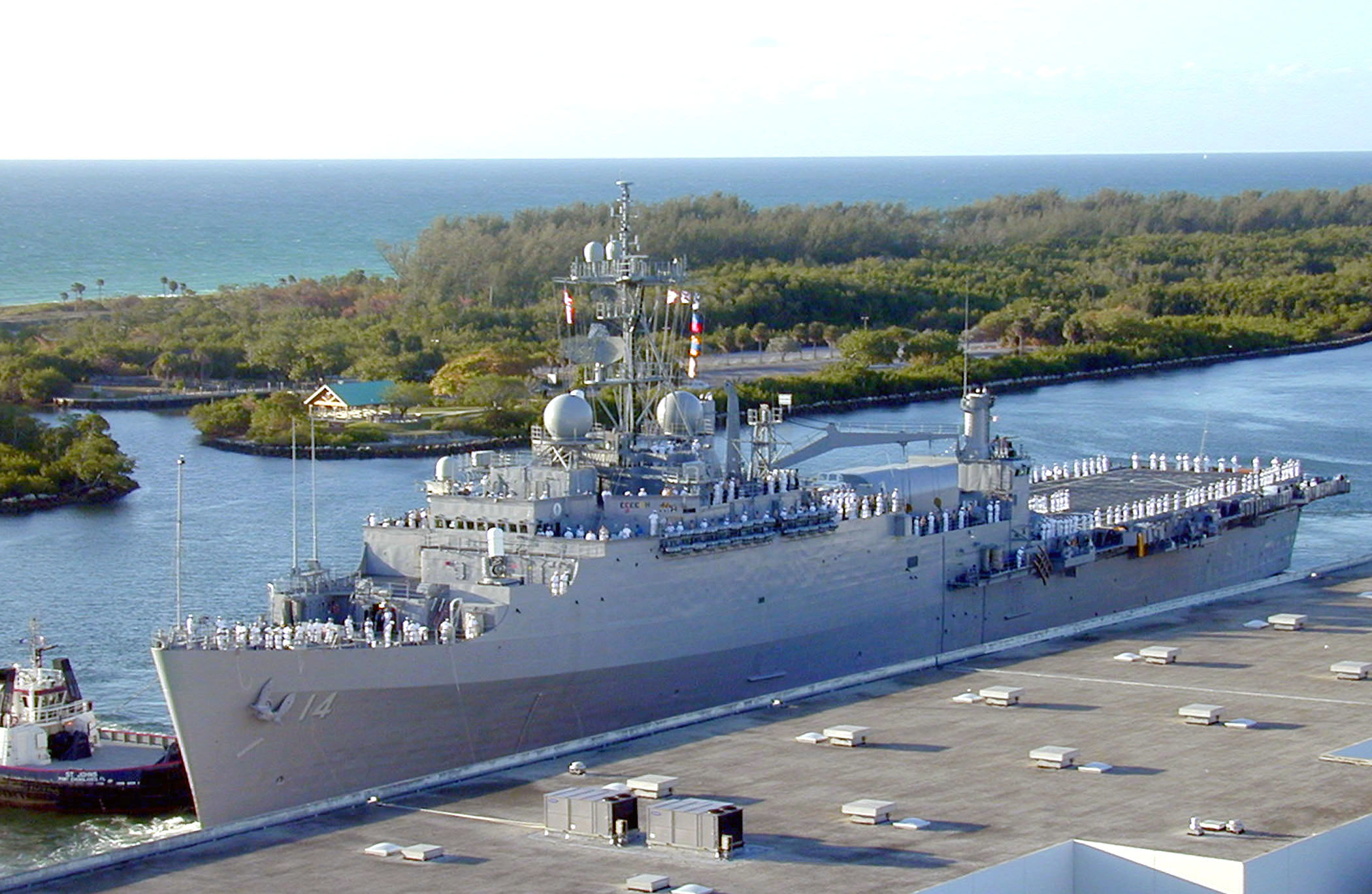
USS Trenton (LPD-14)

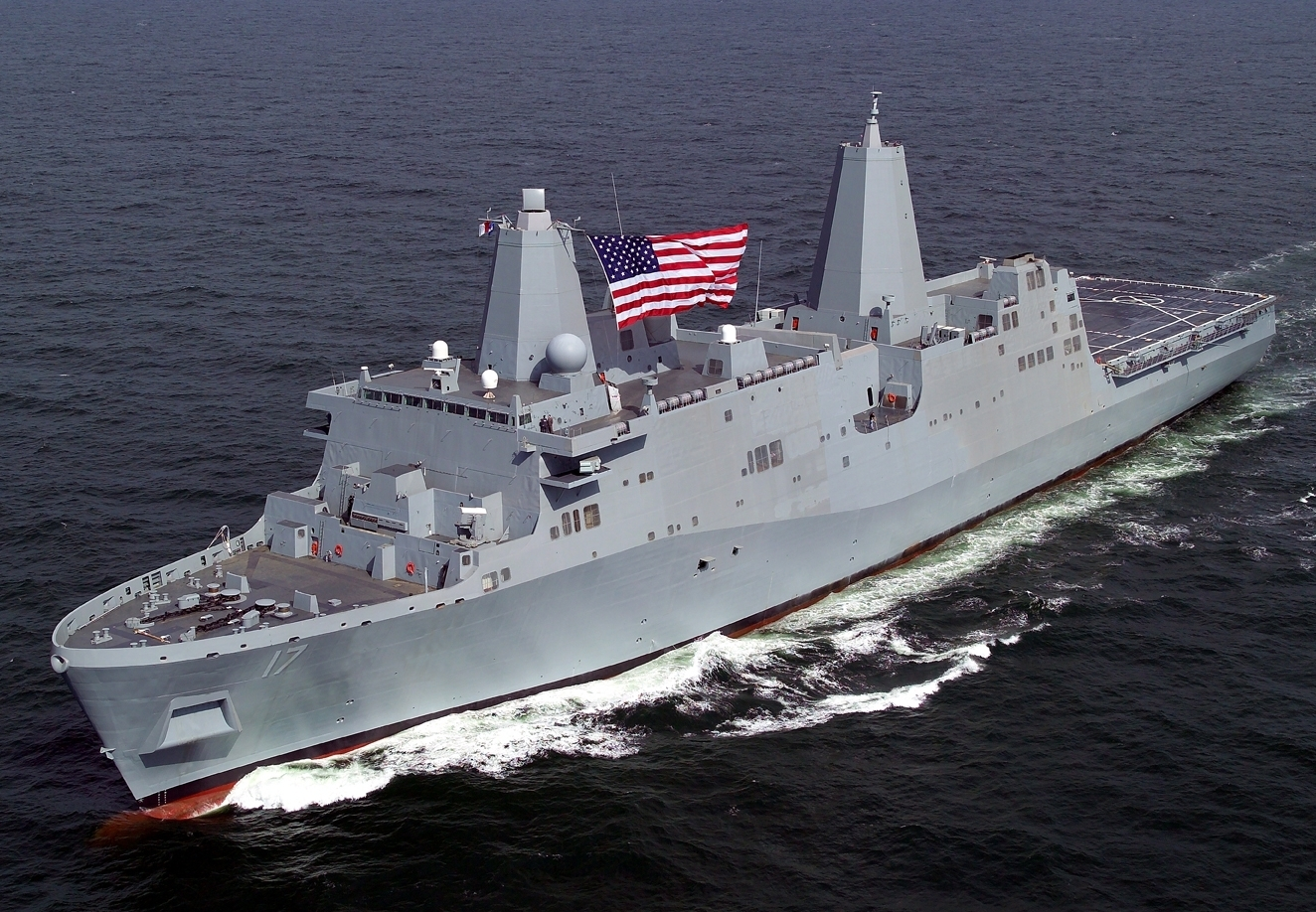
USS San Antonio (LPD-17)

The Landing Platform Dock (LPD) concept began as a compromise design, an attempt to build a ship with much more capability than a Landing Ship Dock (LSD) - the LPD superficially resembles an LSD with an enlarged flight deck - but without the expense of a LPH. The well deck is smaller than that of an LSD. The Raleigh and Austin classes could be fitted with a temporary telescoping helicopter hangar.

Several of these ships were built with space dedicated for command capabilities. Two of these, La Salle and Coronado, would be redesignated as auxiliary command ships (AGF).

The Raleigh class would be designed under project SBC 187 (La Salle under SBC 187A) and the Austin class under SBC 187B.

Raleigh class

- USS Raleigh (LPD-1)
- USS Vancouver (LPD-2)
- USS La Salle (LPD-3), later AGF-3

Austin class

- USS Austin (LPD-4)
- USS Ogden (LPD-5)
- USS Duluth (LPD-6)

Austin class (Cleveland subclass)

- USS Cleveland (LPD-7)
- USS Dubuque (LPD-8)
- USS Denver (LPD-9)
- USS Juneau (LPD-10)
- USS Coronado (LPD-11), later AGF-11
- USS Shreveport (LPD-12)
- USS Nashville (LPD-13)

Austin class (Trenton subclass)

- USS Trenton (LPD-14), later INS Jalashwa
- USS Ponce (LPD-15), later AFSB-15
- (LPD-16), not built

San Antonio class

The San Antonio-class were the first LPDs designed to accommodate Landing Craft Air Cushion (LCAC); two could be carried. They were also the first LPDs to be built with a permanent helicopter hangar.

- USS San Antonio (LPD-17) [A]
- USS New Orleans (LPD-18) [A]
- USS Mesa Verde (LPD-19) [A]
- USS Green Bay (LPD-20) [A]
- USS New York (LPD-21) [A]
- USS San Diego (LPD-22) [A]
- USS Anchorage (LPD-23) [A]
- USS Arlington (LPD-24) [A]
- USS Somerset (LPD-25) [A]
- USS John P. Murtha (LPD-26) [A]
- USS Portland (LPD-27) [A]
- USS Fort Lauderdale (LPD-28) [A]
- USS Richard M. McCool Jr. (LPD-29) [A]
- USS Harrisburg (LPD-30) [P]
- USS Pittsburgh (LPD-31) [P]
- USS Philadelphia (LPD-32) [P]
- USS Travis Manion (LPD-33) [P]
- (LPD-34) [P]
- (LPD-35) [P]

== Landing Ship Dock (LSD) ==
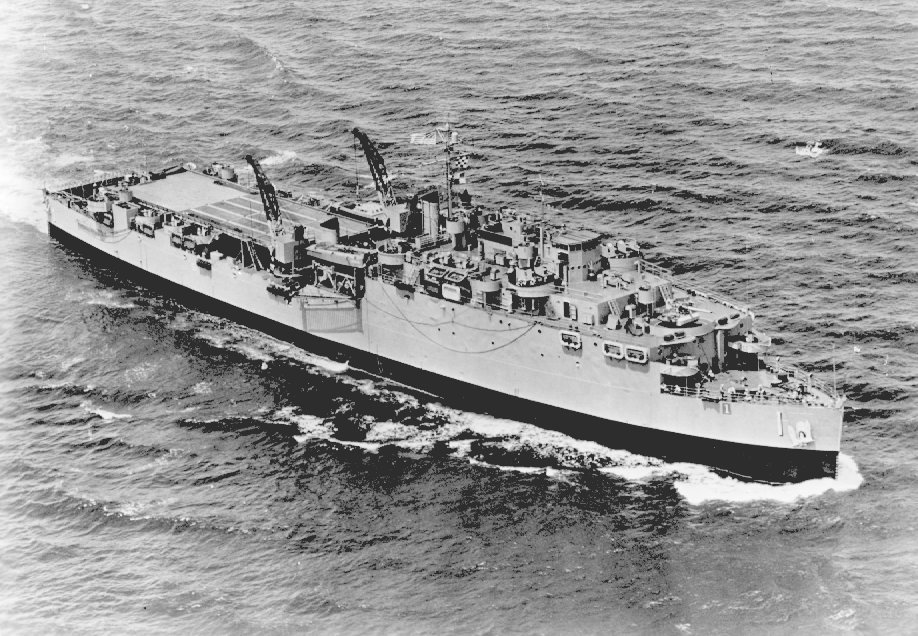
USS Ashland (LSD-1)

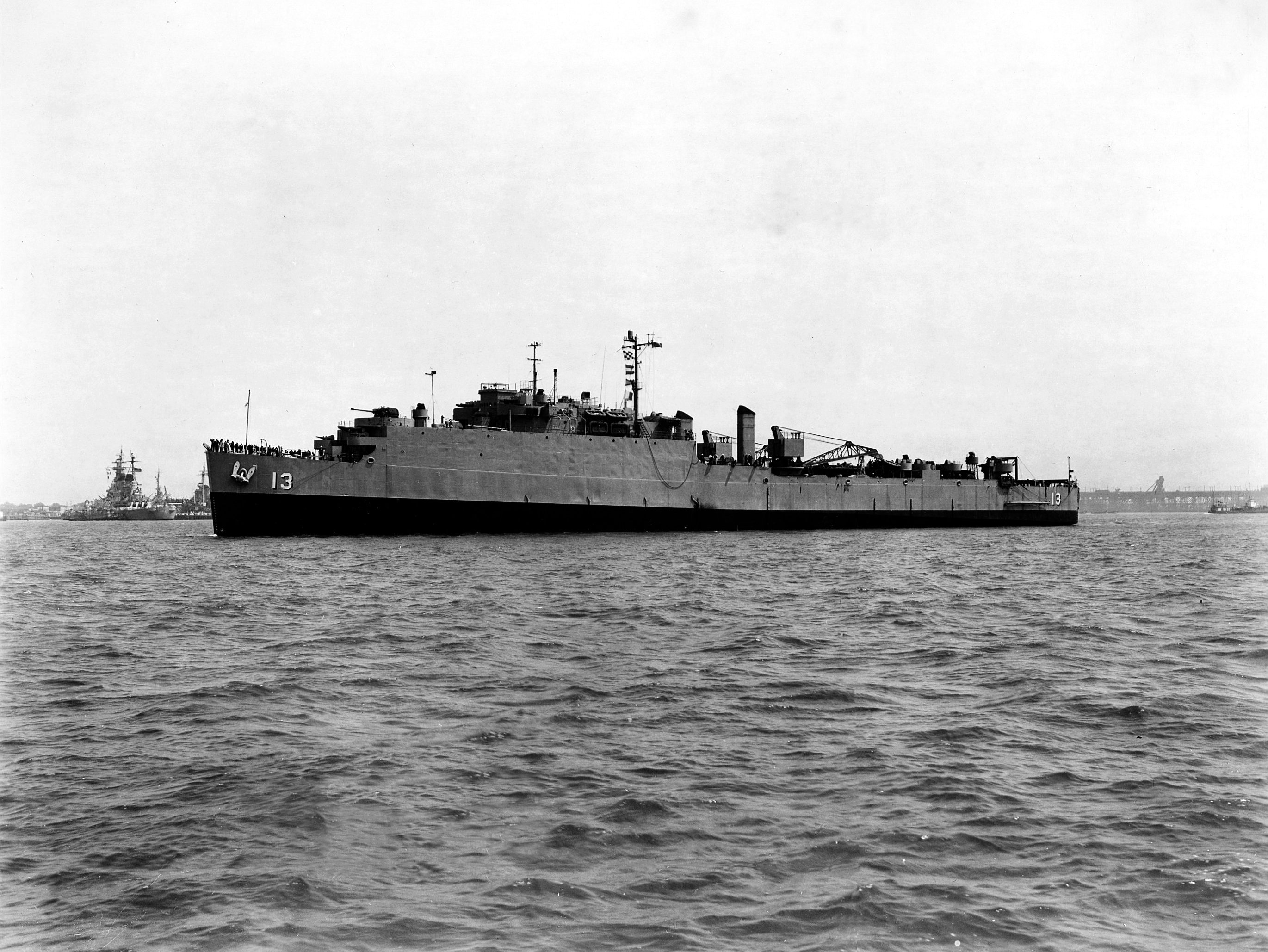
USS Casa Grande (LSD-13)

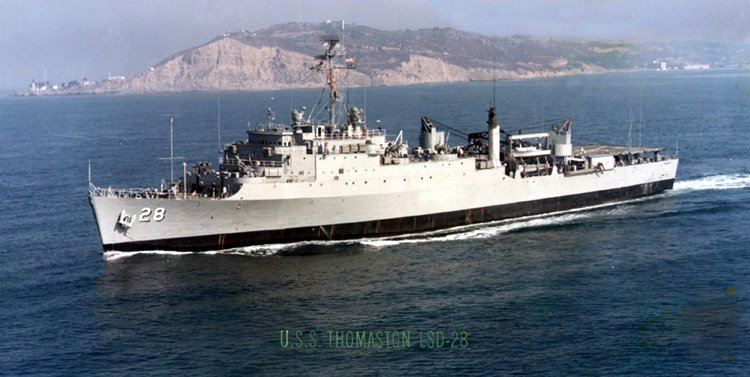
USS Thomaston (LSD-28)

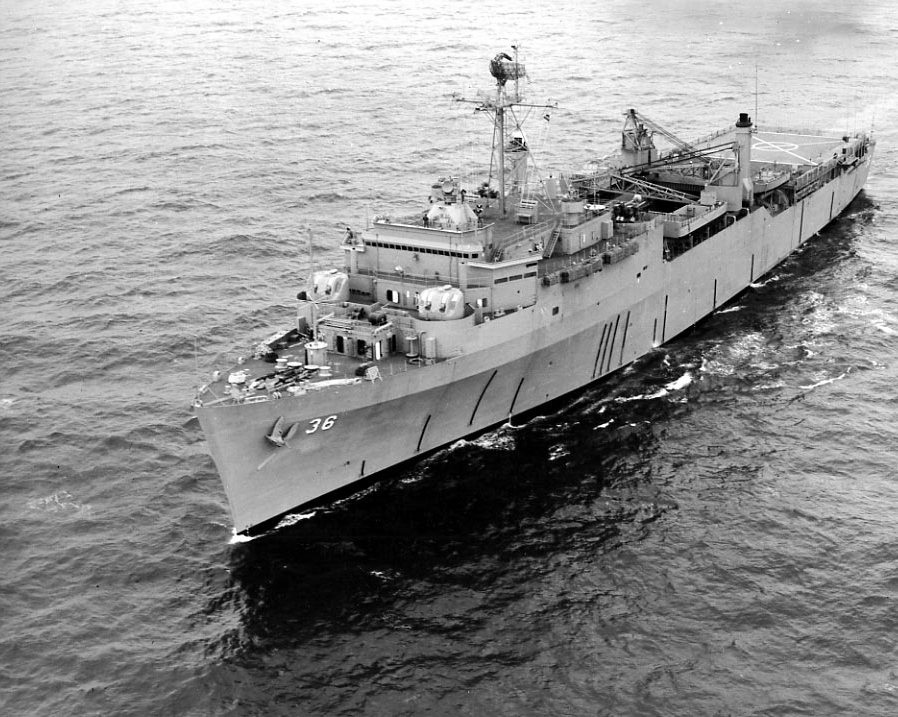
USS Anchorage (LSD-36)

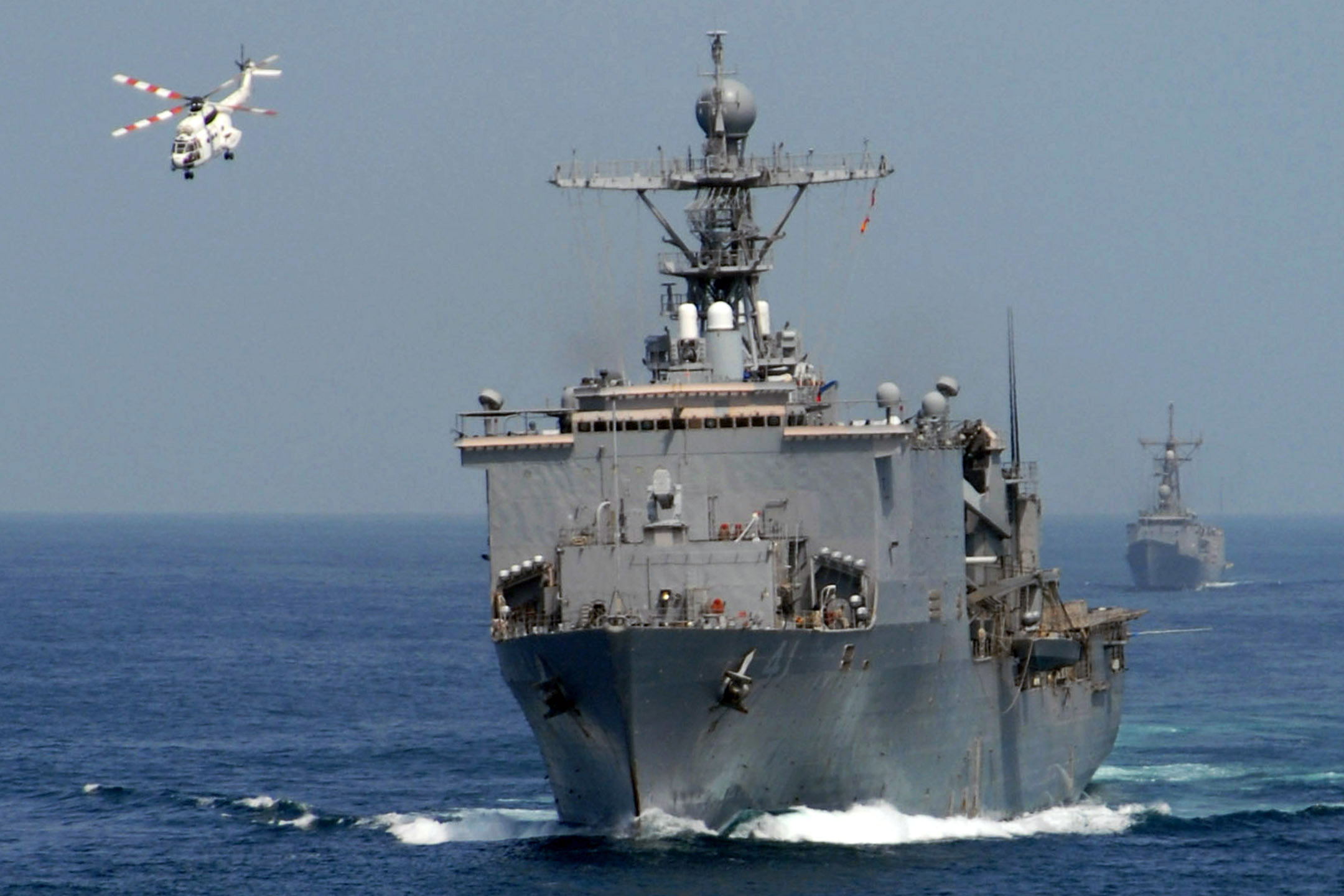
USS Whidbey Island (LSD-41)

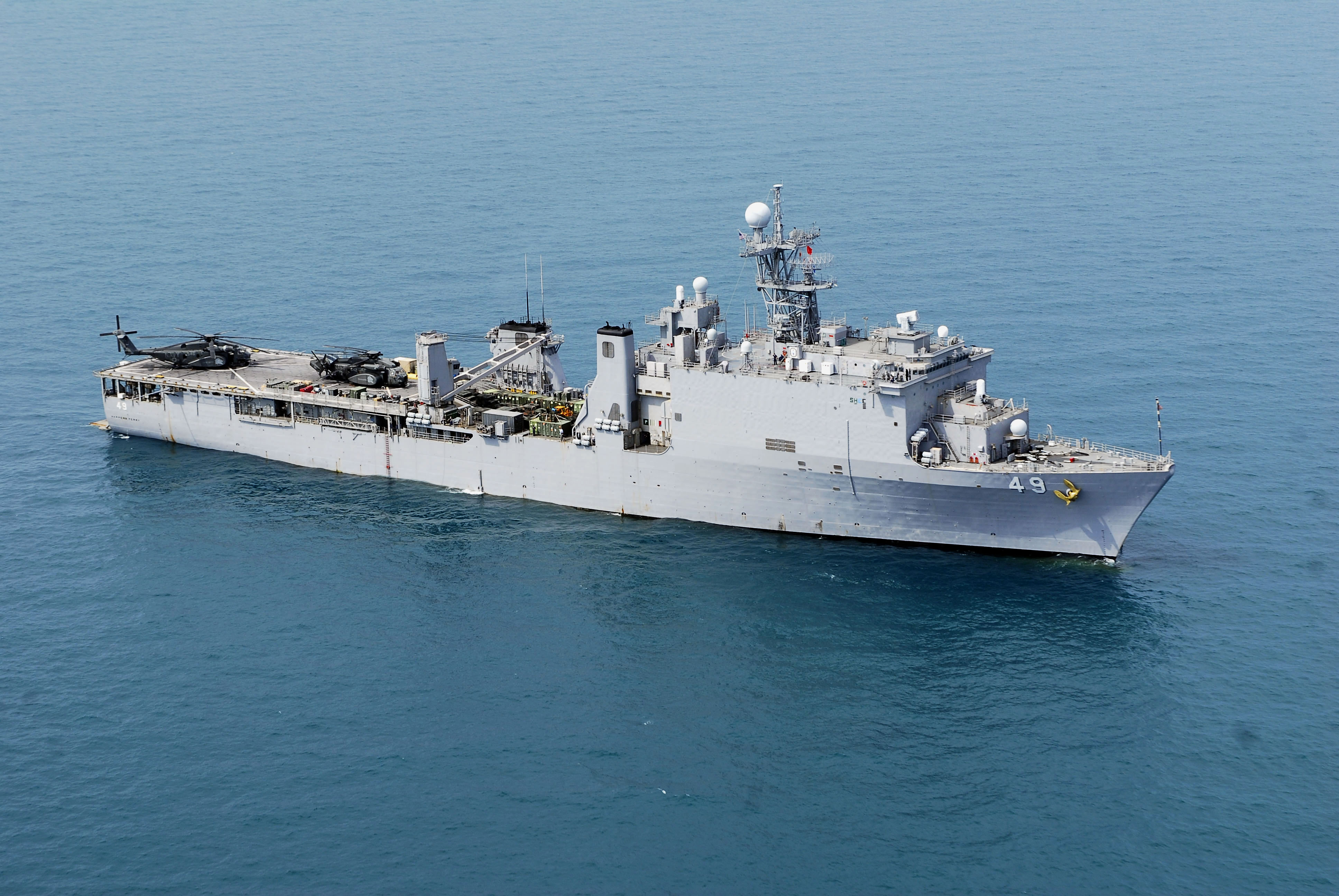
USS Harper's Ferry (LSD-49)

The LSD came as a result of a British requirement during World War II for a vessel that could carry large landing craft across the seas at speed. The design was developed and built in the US for the Royal Navy and the US Navy, with the US Navy originally classifying these ships as Mechanized artillery transports (APM), then changing them to LSDs. The first LSDs could carry 36 Landing Craft Mechanized (LCM) at 16 knots (30 km/h) in a flooding well deck, the first ships with this capability. Late in the war they were modified with the addition of a temporary superdeck over the well deck; this could carry vehicles, support helicopter operations, or be removed for outsized cargo.

In December 2020 the U.S. Navy's Report to Congress on the Annual Long-Range Plan for Construction of Naval Vessels stated that it was planned that all LSDs would be placed Out of Commission in Reserve by 2027.

Ashland class

- USS Ashland (LSD-1)
- USS Belle Grove (LSD-2), Operation Castle nuclear test participant
- USS Carter Hall (LSD-3)
- USS Epping Forest (LSD-4), later MCS-7
- USS Gunston Hall (LSD-5), Operation Crossroads nuclear test participant, later ARA Cándido de Lasala
- USS Lindenwald (LSD-6)
- USS Oak Hill (LSD-7), nuclear tests participant (Note: USS Oak Hill participated in Operation Ivy and Operation Dominic)
- USS White Marsh (LSD-8), later ROCS Chung Cheng until 1985

Casa Grande class

- (LSD-9) To Britain as HMS Eastway
- (LSD-10) To Britain as HMS Highway
- (LSD-11) To Britain as HMS Northway
- (LSD-12) To Britain as HMS Oceanway
- USS Casa Grande (LSD-13)
- USS Rushmore (LSD-14)
- USS Shadwell (LSD-15)
- USS Cabildo (LSD-16), Operation Dominic nuclear test participant
- USS Catamount (LSD-17)
- USS Colonial (LSD-18)
- USS Comstock (LSD-19), Operation Sandstone nuclear test participant, later ROCS Chung Cheng after 1985
- USS Donner (LSD-20)
- USS Fort Mandan (LSD-21)
- USS Fort Marion (LSD-22), nuclear tests participant (Note: USS Fort Marion participated in Operation Wigwam and Operation Dominic)
- USS Fort Snelling (LSD-23), canceled, sold for commercial service, later reacquired and converted to USNS Taurus (T-AK-273)
- USS Point Defiance (LSD-24), canceled
- USS San Marcos (LSD-25), Operation Crossroads participant
- USS Tortuga (LSD-26)
- USS Whetstone (LSD-27)

Thomaston class

The Thomaston class, designed under project SCB 75, would be the first class of LSDs capable of 20 knots.

- USS Thomaston (LSD-28)
- USS Plymouth Rock (LSD-29)
- USS Fort Snelling (LSD-30), Project SHAD chemical/biological test participant
- USS Point Defiance (LSD-31), Operation Dominic participant
- USS Spiegel Grove (LSD-32)
- USS Alamo (LSD-33), later Brazilian Rio de Janeiro
- USS Hermitage (LSD-34), later Brazilian Ceará
- USS Monticello (LSD-35), Operation Dominic participant

Anchorage class

The Anchorage class, designed under project SCB 404, was basically the Thomaston class with the well deck enlarged (49 feet longer and 2 feet wider) to accommodate the new larger LCU-1610 class. They would later be modified to carry up to 3 Landing Craft Air Cushion (LCAC).

- USS Anchorage (LSD-36)
- USS Portland (LSD-37)
- USS Pensacola (LSD-38), later ROCS Hsu Hai
- USS Mount Vernon (LSD-39)
- USS Fort Fisher (LSD-40)

Whidbey Island class

The Whidbey Island-class were the first LSDs designed to accommodate LCACs - up to 5 could be carried - and the first in which the helicopter deck would not be removable.

- USS Whidbey Island (LSD-41) [I]
- USS Germantown (LSD-42) [I]
- USS Fort McHenry (LSD-43) [I]
- USS Gunston Hall (LSD-44) [A]
- USS Comstock (LSD-45) [A]
- USS Tortuga (LSD-46) [A]
- USS Rushmore (LSD-47) [A]
- USS Ashland (LSD-48) [A]

Harpers Ferry class

The Harpers Ferry-class is basically the Whidbey Island-class with more cargo capacity at the expense of a shorter well deck which could carry 2 LCACs.

- USS Harpers Ferry (LSD-49) [A]
- USS Carter Hall (LSD-50) [A]
- USS Oak Hill (LSD-51) [A]
- USS Pearl Harbor (LSD-52) [A]

== Mechanized artillery transports (APM) ==
The APM hull classification was short-lived; it was changed to Landing Ship Dock (LSD).

- USS Ashland (APM-1)
- USS Belle Grove (APM-2)
- USS Carter Hall (APM-3)
- USS Epping Forest (APM-4)
- USS Gunston Hall (APM-5)
- USS Lindenwald (APM-6)
- USS Oak Hill (APM-7)
- USS White Marsh (APM-8)
- USS Lakehurst (APM-9)

== Amphibious command ship (LCC) ==
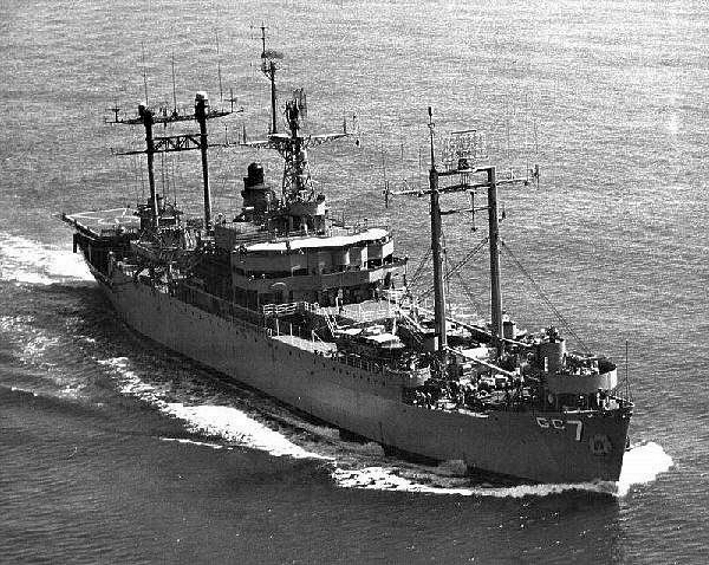
USS Mount McKinley (LCC-7)

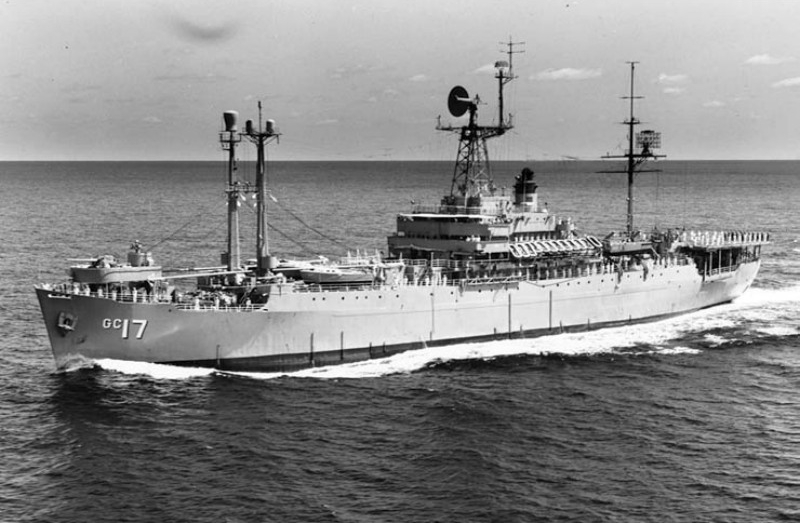
USS Taconic (LCC-17)

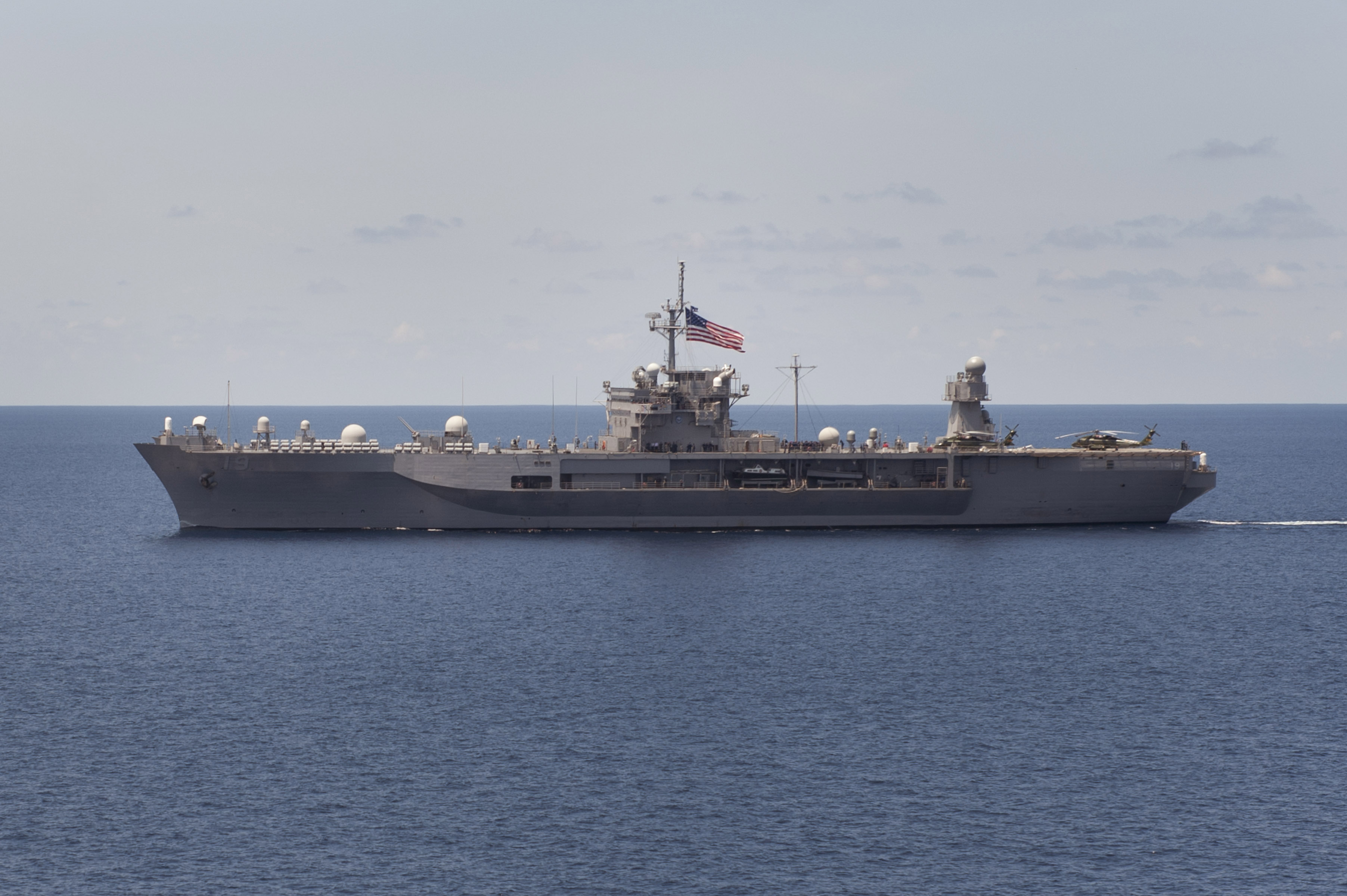
USS Blue Ridge (LCC-19)

All Amphibious force flagships (AGC) in service in 1969 were reclassed as Amphibious Command Ships (LCC), which should not be confused with the World War II era Landing craft, control (LCC).

Mount McKinley class: MC type C2-S-AJ1

- USS Mount McKinley (LCC-7)
- USS Eldorado (LCC-11)
- USS Estes (LCC-12)

Adirondack class

- USS Pocono (LCC-16)
- USS Taconic (LCC-17)

Blue Ridge class

The Blue Ridge-class would be the only amphibious command ships purposely built as such by the US Navy, and the first and only class capable of keeping up with a 20 knot amphibious force. Their hulls were based on the Iwo Jima-class Landing Platform Helicopter (LPH) design due to the need for flat deck space for multiple antennas. After the retirement of the fleet flagships [cruisers] (see also List of cruisers of the United States Navy § Command cruisers (CLC, CC)) these ships would be pressed into that role despite their lack of speed relative to carrier strike groups.

- USS Blue Ridge (LCC-19) [A]
- USS Mount Whitney (LCC-20) [A]

== Amphibious force flagship (AGC) ==
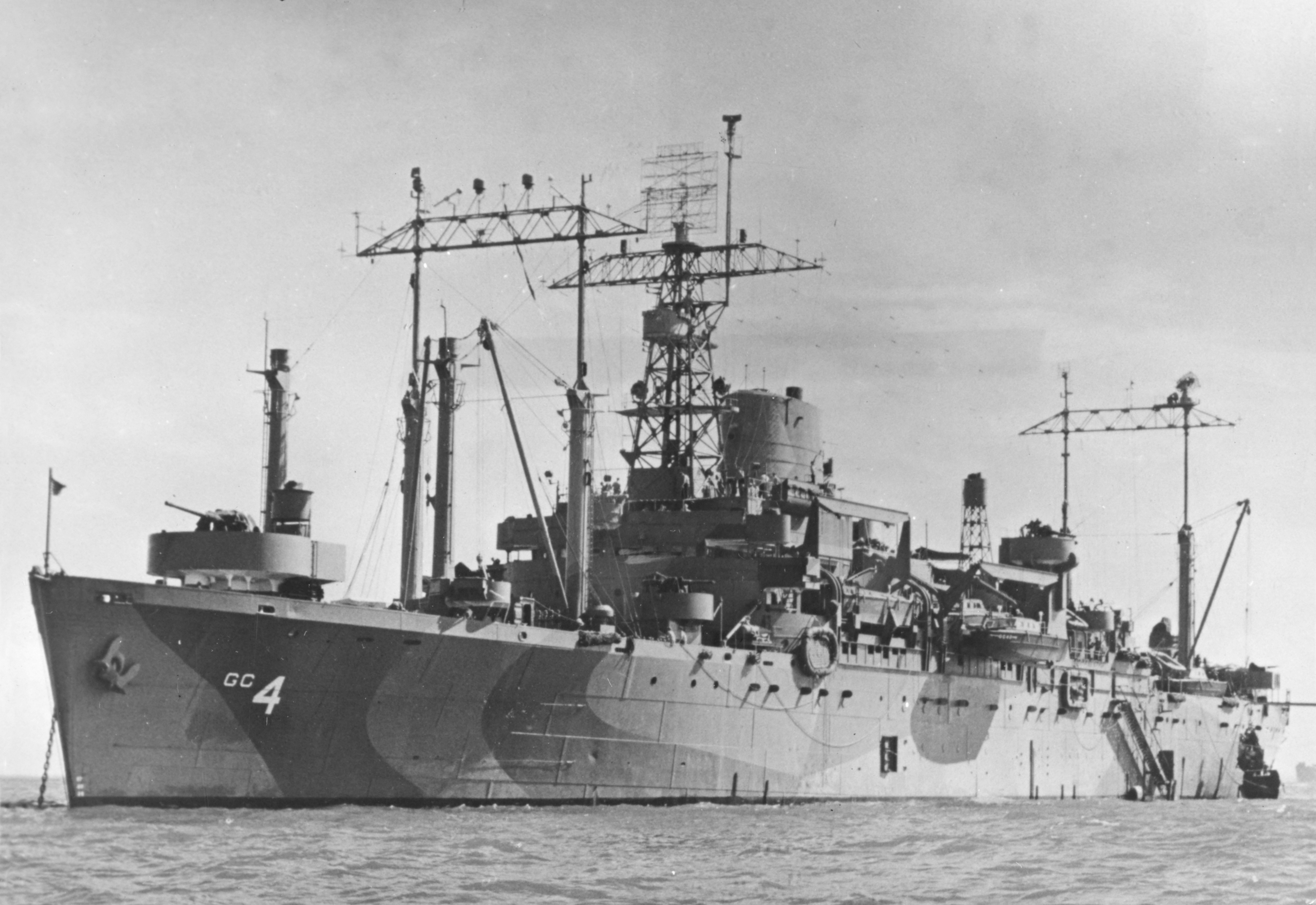
USS Ancon (AGC-4)

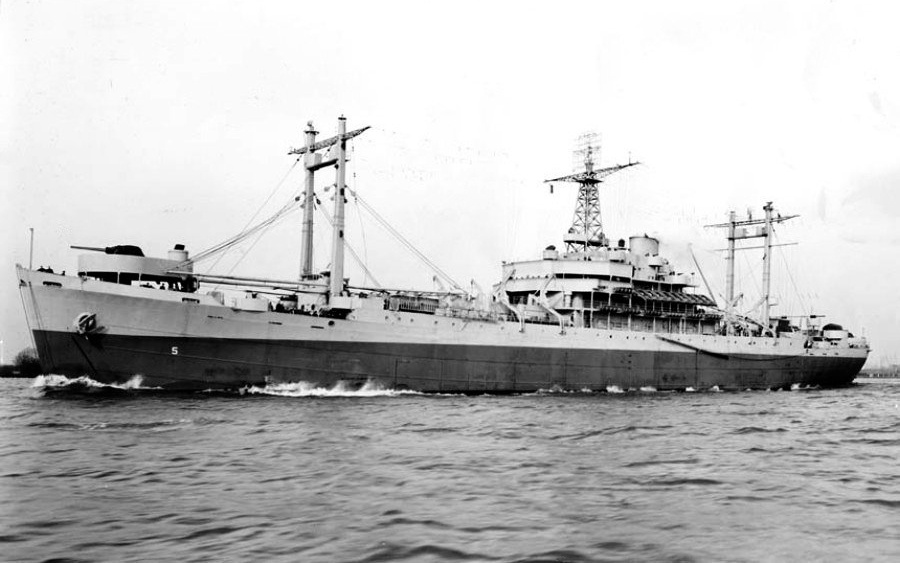
USS Catoctin (AGC-5)

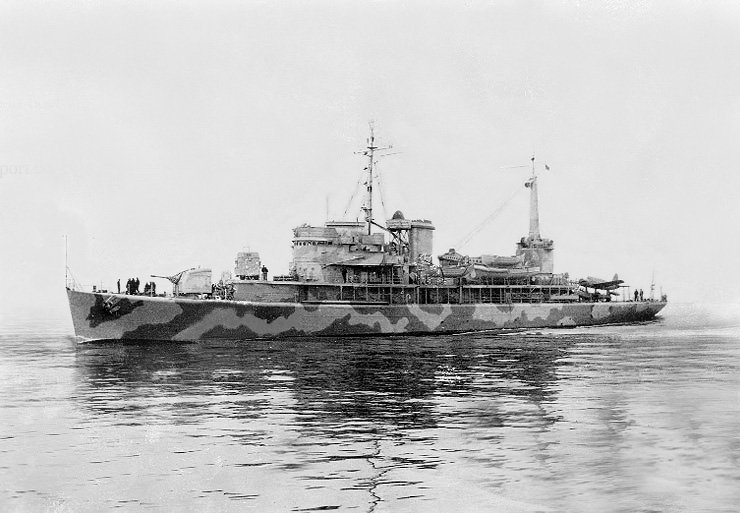
USS Biscayne (AGC-18)

All Amphibious Force Flagships (AGC) in service in 1969 were reclassed as Amphibious command ships (LCC).

Appalachian class: MC type C2-S-B1

- USS Appalachian (AGC-1), Operation Crossroads nuclear test participant
- USS Blue Ridge (AGC-2), Operation Crossroads participant
- USS Rocky Mount (AGC-3)
- USS Catoctin (AGC-5)

Troop transport conversion

- USS Ancon (AGC-4), ex-AP-66

Coast Guard cutter conversions

- USCGC Duane (WAGC-6), ex-WPG-33
- USCGC Taney (WAGC-37), ex-WPG-37

Mount McKinley class: MC type C2-S-AJ1

- USS Mount McKinley (AGC-7), nuclear tests participant (Note: USS Mount McKinley participated in Operation Sandstone and Operation Wigwam) later LCC-7
- USS Mount Olympus (AGC-8)
- USS Wasatch (AGC-9)
- USS Auburn (AGC-10)
- USS Eldorado (AGC-11), later LCC-11
- USS Estes (AGC-12), nuclear tests participant, (Note: USS Estes participated in Operation Ivy and Operation Castle) later LCC-12
- USS Panamint (AGC-13), Operation Crossroads participant
- USS Teton (AGC-14)

Adirondack class

- USS Adirondack (AGC-15)
- USS Pocono (AGC-16), later LCC-16
- USS Taconic (AGC-17), later LCC-17

Barnegat class

- USS Biscayne (AGC-18), ex-AVP-11

Presidential yacht (never used as a true AGC)

- USS Williamsburg (AGC-369), ex-PG-56

== Amphibious cargo ship (LKA) ==
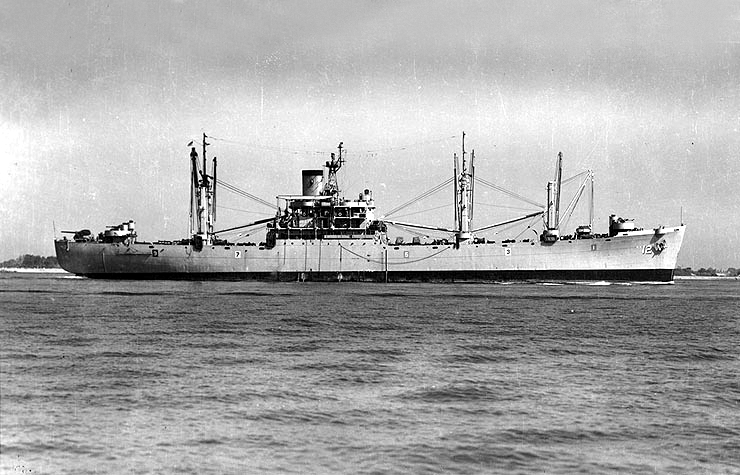
USS Libra (LKA-12)

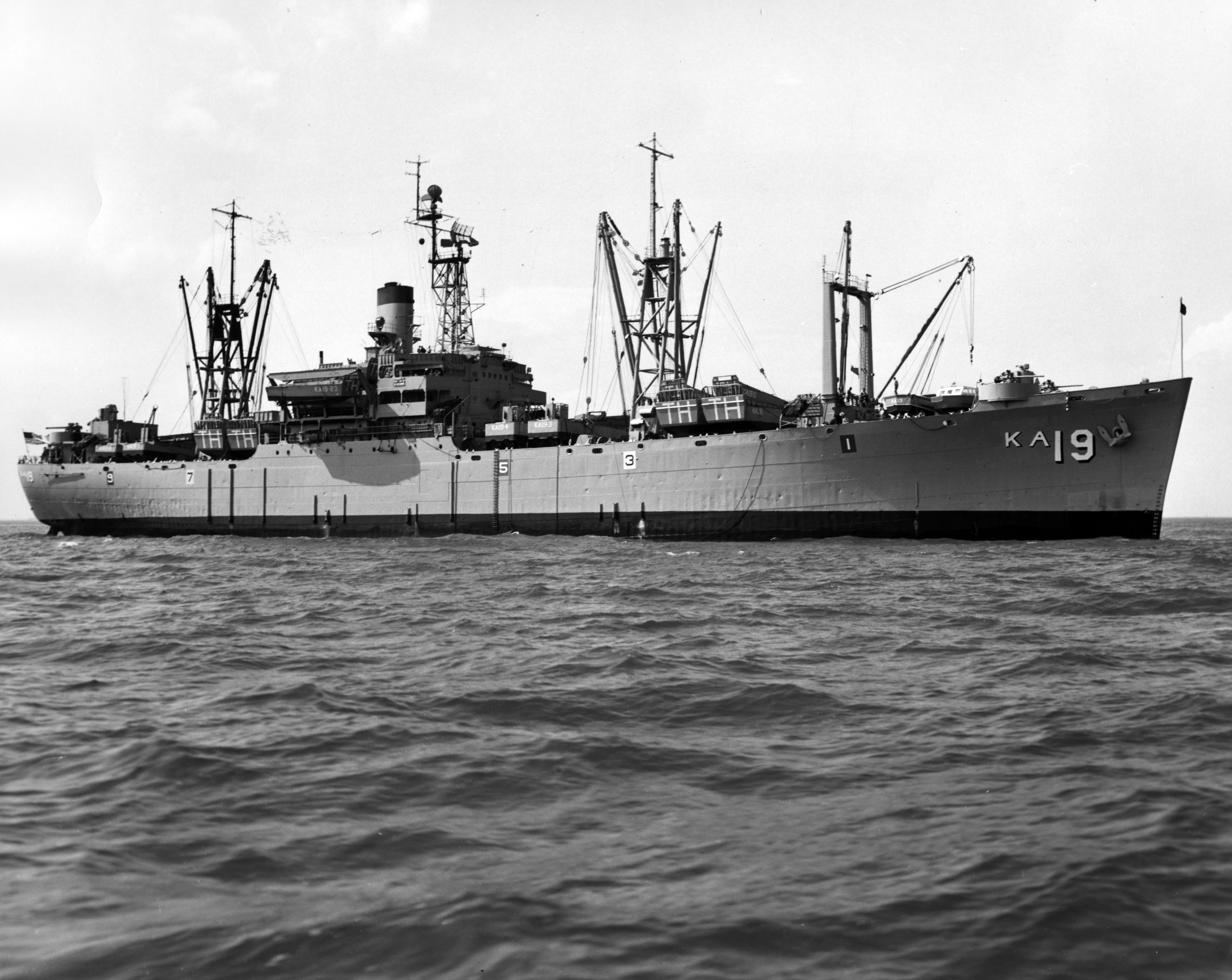
USS Thuban (LKA-19)

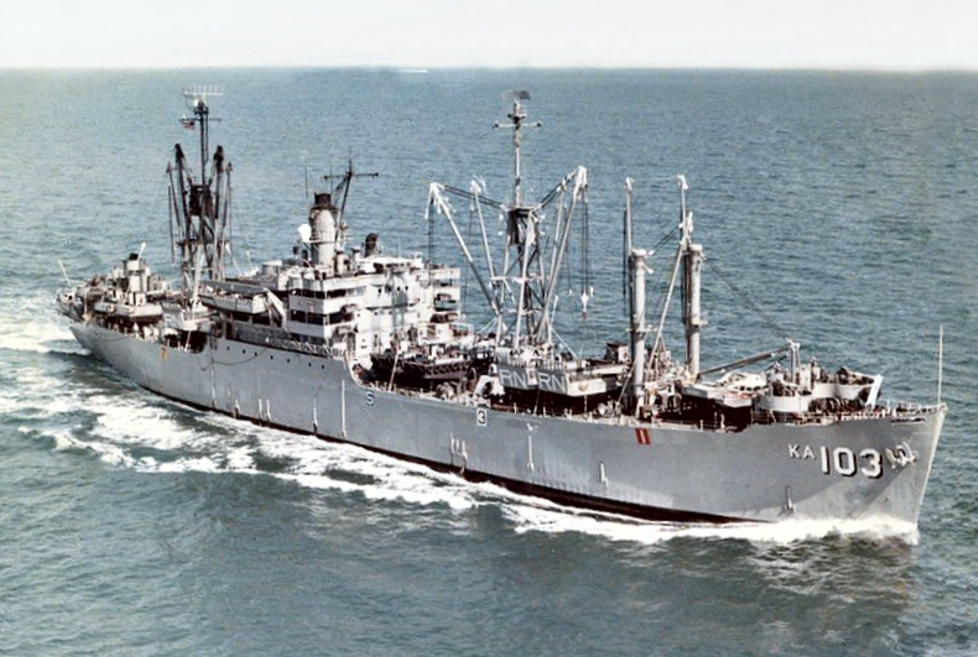
USS Rankin (LKA-103)

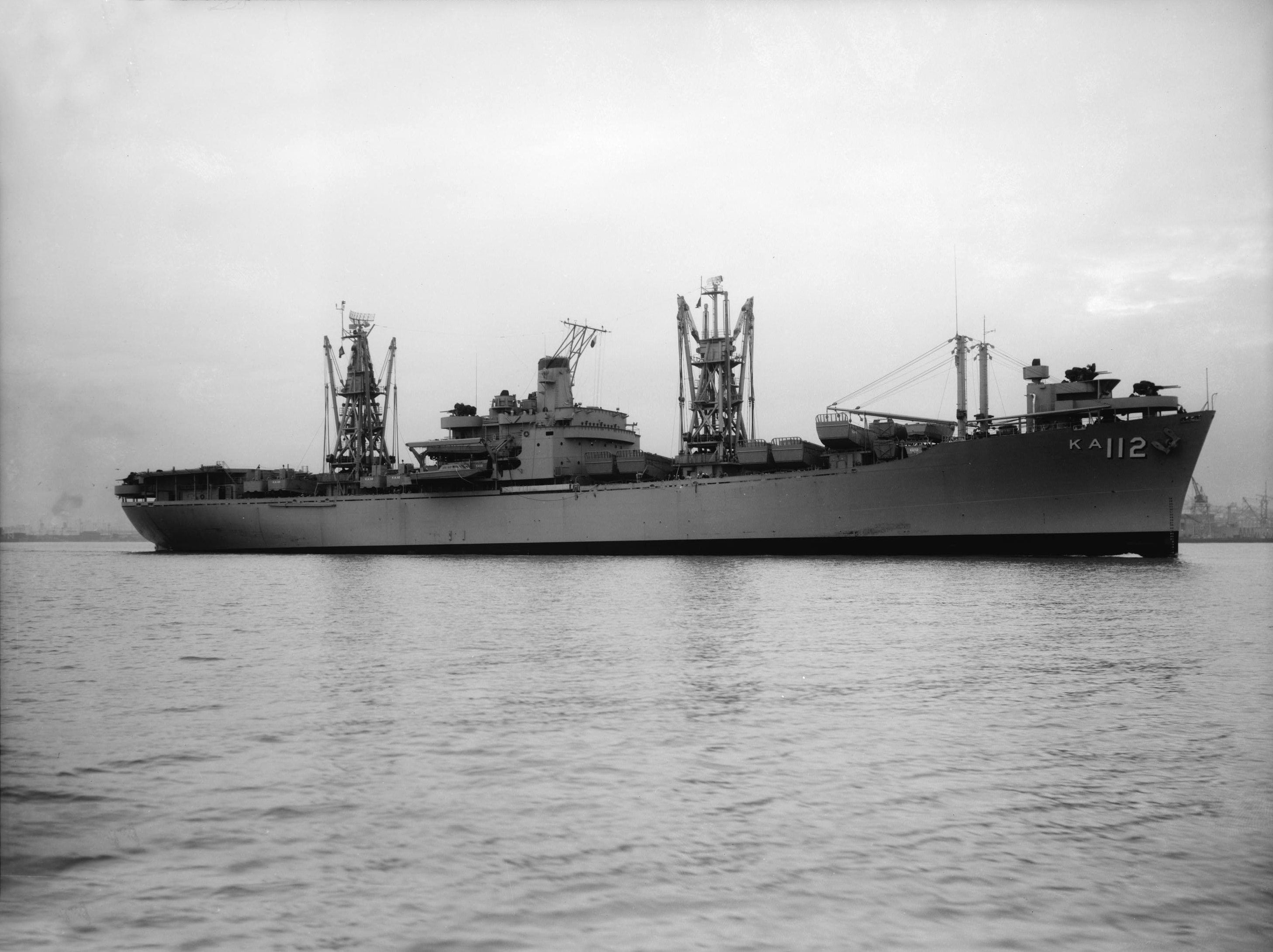
USS Tulare (LKA-112)

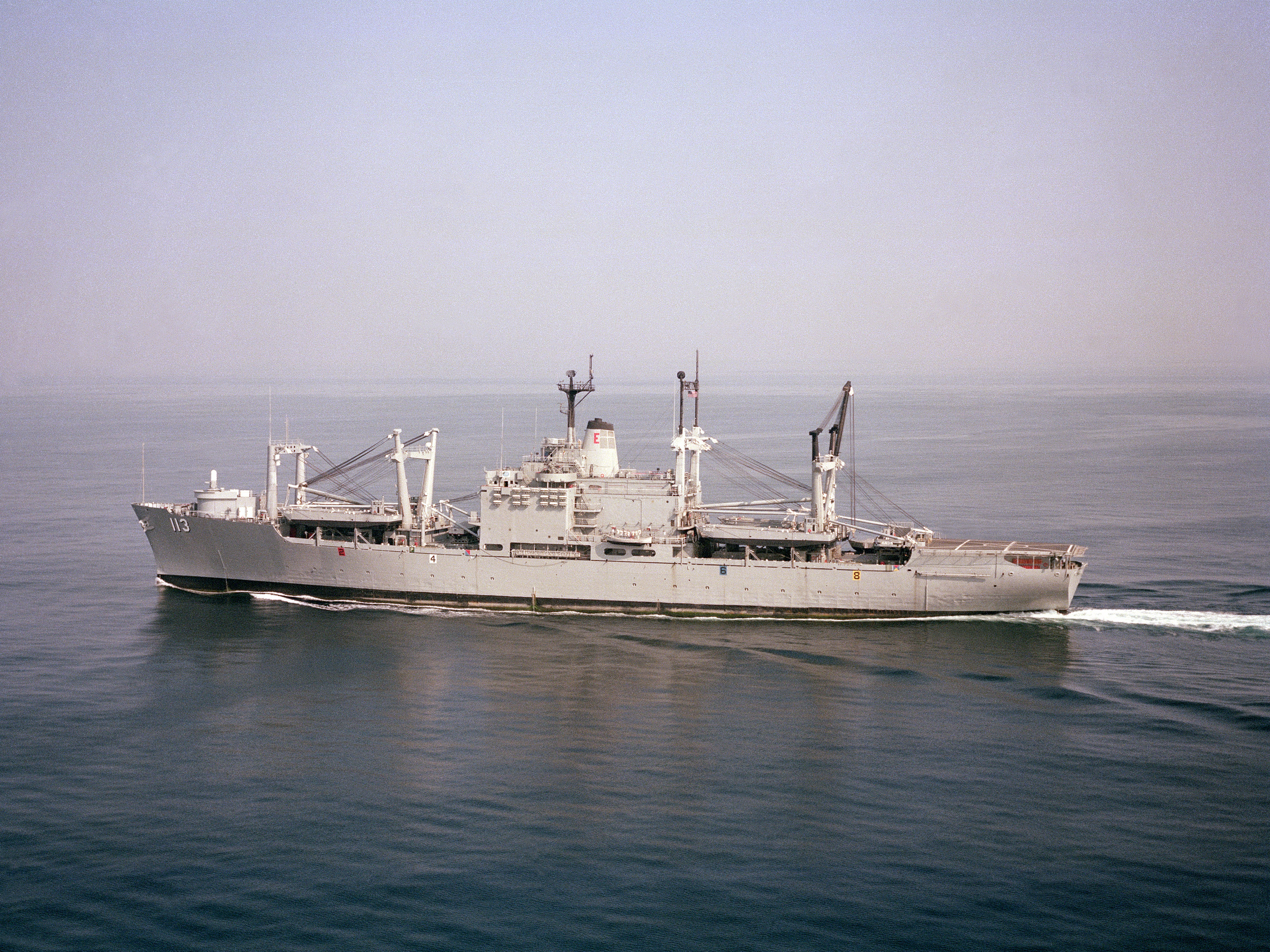
USS Charleston (LKA-113)

All Attack cargo ships (AKA) in service in 1969 were reclassed as Amphibious Cargo Ships (LKA).

Arcturus class

- USS Libra (LKA-12)

Andromeda class: MA type C2

- USS Thuban (LKA-19)
- USS Algol (LKA-54)
- USS Arneb (LKA-56)
- USS Capricornus (LKA-57)
- USS Muliphen (LKA-61)
- USS Yancey (LKA-93)
- USS Winston (LKA-94)
- USS Merrick (LKA-97)

Tolland class: MA type C2-S-AJ3

- USS Rankin (LKA-103)
- USS Seminole (LKA-104)
- USS Skagit (LKA-105)
- USS Union (LKA-106)
- USS Vermilion (LKA-107)
- USS Washburn (LKA-108)

Tulare class: MA type C4-S-1A

The Tulare would be the first AKA/LKA capable of 20 knots

- USS Tulare (LKA-112)

Charleston class: MA type C4-S-1A

- USS Charleston (LKA-113)
- USS Durham (LKA-114)
- USS Mobile (LKA-115)
- USS St. Louis (LKA-116)
- USS El Paso (LKA-117)

== Attack cargo ship (AKA) ==
The Attack Cargo Ship (AKA) hull symbol was introduced on 1 February 1943; all AKA ships remaining in service in 1969 were reclassed as Amphibious cargo ships (LKA).

Arcturus class: MC type C2

- USS Arcturus (AKA-1), ex-AK-18
- USS Procyon (AKA-2), ex-AK-19
- USS Bellatrix (AKA-3), ex-AK-20
- USS Electra (AKA-4), ex-AK-21
- USS Fomalhaut (AKA-5), ex-AK-22, later AE-20
- USS Alchiba (AKA-6), ex-AK-23
- USS Alcyone (AKA-7), ex-AK-24
- USS Algorab (AKA-8), ex-AK-25
- USS Alhena (AKA-9), ex-AK-26
- USS Almaack (AKA-10), ex-AK-27
- USS Betelgeuse (AKA-11), ex-AK-28
- USS Libra (AKA-12), ex-AK-53, later LKA-12
- USS Titania (AKA-13), ex-AK-55
- USS Oberon (AKA-14), ex-AK-56

Andromeda class: MC type C2

- USS Andromeda (AKA-15), ex-AK-64
- USS Aquarius (AKA-16), ex-AK-65
- USS Centaurus (AKA-17), ex-AK-66
- USS Cepheus (AKA-18), ex-AK-67
- USS Thuban (AKA-19), ex-AK-68, later LKA-19
- USS Virgo (AKA-20), ex-AK-69, later AE-30

Artemis class: MC type S4-SE2-BD1

The Artemis class was deliberately smaller than other classes of attack cargo ships, to reduce the risks of having too many troops and large quantities of cargo in a single hull. After WW2 most were quickly disposed of as uneconomical.

- USS Artemis (AKA-21), Operation Crossroads nuclear test participant
- USS Athene (AKA-22)
- USS Aurelia (AKA-23)
- USS Birgit (AKA-24)
- USS Circe (AKA-25)
- USS Corvus (AKA-26)
- USS Devosa (AKA-27)
- USS Hydrus (AKA-28)
- USS Lacerta (AKA-29)
- USS Lumen (AKA-30)
- USS Medea (AKA-31)
- USS Mellena (AKA-32), later TS Golden Bear
- USS Ostara (AKA-33)
- USS Pamina (AKA-34), later AGS-15
- USS Polana (AKA-35)
- USS Renate (AKA-36), later AGS-16
- USS Roxane (AKA-37)
- USS Sappho (AKA-38)
- USS Sarita (AKA-39)
- USS Scania (AKA-40)
- USS Selinur (AKA-41)
- USS Sidonia (AKA-42)
- USS Sirona (AKA-43)
- USS Sylvania (AKA-44), Operation Crossroads participant
- USS Tabora (AKA-45)
- USS Troilus (AKA-46)
- USS Turandot (AKA-47), later ARC-3
- USS Valeria (AKA-48)
- USS Vanadis (AKA-49), later ARC-4
- USS Veritas (AKA-50)
- USS Xenia (AKA-51)
- USS Zenobia (AKA-52)

Andromeda class: MC type C2

- USS Achernar (AKA-53)
- USS Algol (AKA-54), later LKA-54
- USS Alshain (AKA-55)
- USS Arneb (AKA-56), later LKA-56
- USS Capricornus (AKA-57), later LKA-57
- USS Chara (AKA-58), later AE-31
- USS Diphda (AKA-59)
- USS Leo (AKA-60), nuclear tests participant (Note: USS Leo participated in Operation Ivy and Operation Castle)
- USS Muliphen (AKA-61), later LKA-61
- USS Sheliak (AKA-62)
- USS Theenim (AKA-63)

Tolland class: MC Type C2-S-AJ3

- USS Tolland (AKA-64)
- USS Shoshone (AKA-65)
- USS Southampton (AKA-66)
- USS Starr (AKA-67)
- USS Stokes (AKA-68)
- USS Suffolk (AKA-69)
- USS Tate (AKA-70)
- USS Todd (AKA-71)
- USS Caswell (AKA-72)
- USS New Hanover (AKA-73)
- USS Lenoir (AKA-74)
- USS Alamance (AKA-75)
- USS Torrance (AKA-76)
- USS Towner (AKA-77)
- USS Trego (AKA-78)
- USS Trousdale (AKA-79)
- USS Tyrrell (AKA-80)
- USS Valencia (AKA-81)
- USS Venango (AKA-82)
- USS Vinton (AKA-83)
- USS Waukesha (AKA-84)
- USS Wheatland (AKA-85)
- USS Woodford (AKA-86)
- USS Duplin (AKA-87)

Andromeda class: MC type C2

- USS Uvalde (AKA-88)
- USS Warrick (AKA-89), Operation Sandstone nuclear test participant
- USS Whiteside (AKA-90)
- USS Whitley (AKA-91)
- USS Wyandot (AKA-92), later T-AK-283
- USS Yancey (AKA-93), Operation Sandstone participant, later LKA-93
- USS Winston (AKA-94), later LKA-94
- USS Marquette (AKA-95)
- USS Mathews (AKA-96)
- USS Merrick (AKA-97), later LKA-97
- USS Montague (AKA-98)
- USS Rolette (AKA-99), Operation Crossroads participant
- USS Oglethorpe (AKA-100)

Tolland class: MC type C2-S-AJ3

- USS Ottawa (AKA-101), Operation Crossroads participant
- USS Prentiss (AKA-102)
- USS Rankin (AKA-103), later LKA-103
- USS Seminole (AKA-104), later LKA-104
- USS Skagit (AKA-105), later LKA-105
- USS Union (AKA-106), later LKA-106
- USS Vermilion (AKA-107), later LKA-107
- USS Washburn (AKA-108), later LKA-108
- USS San Joaquin (AKA-109), canceled 27 August 1945

Andromeda class: MC type C2

- USS Sedgwick (AKA-110), canceled 27 August 1945
- USS Whitfield (AKA-111), canceled 27 August 1945

The Tulare and the Charleston class would be the only AKA/LKAs capable of 20 knots.

- USS Tulare (AKA-112), later LKA-112

Charleston class

- USS Charleston (AKA-113), later LKA-113
- USS Durham (AKA-114), later LKA-114
- USS Mobile (AKA-115), later LKA-115
- USS St. Louis (AKA-116), later LKA-116
- USS El Paso (AKA-117), later LKA-117

== Amphibious transport (LPA) ==
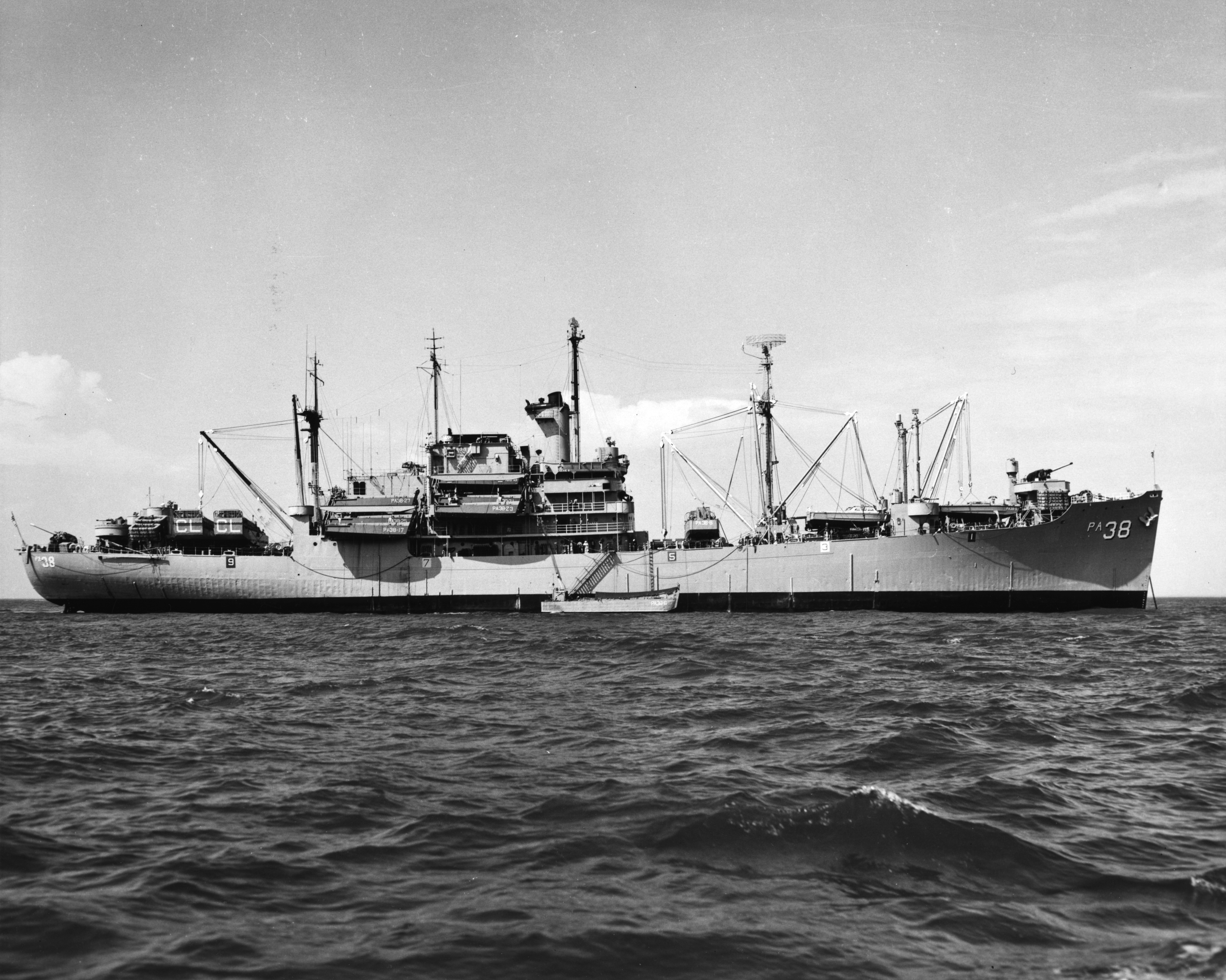
USS Chilton (LPA-38)

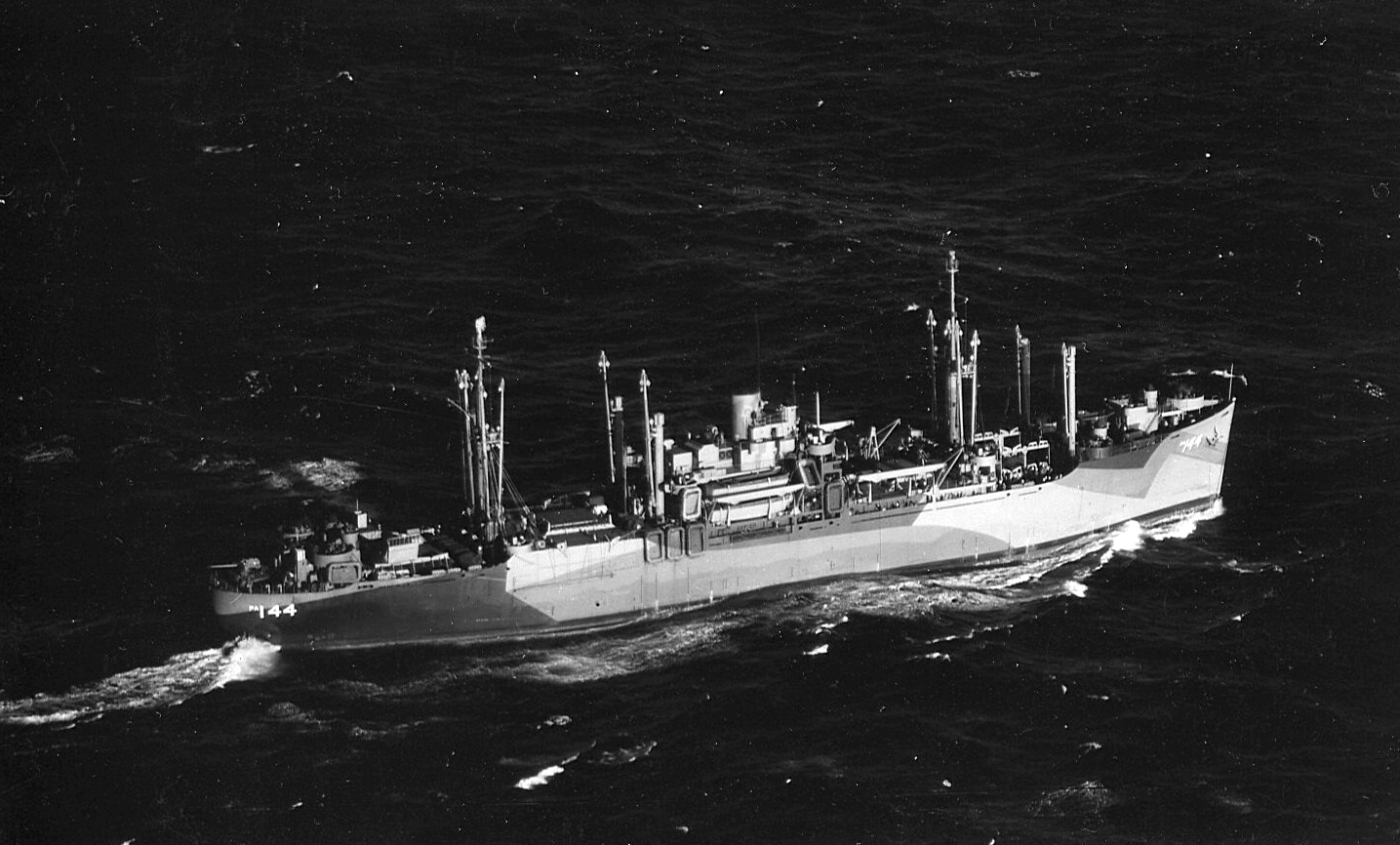
USS Clinton (LPA-144)

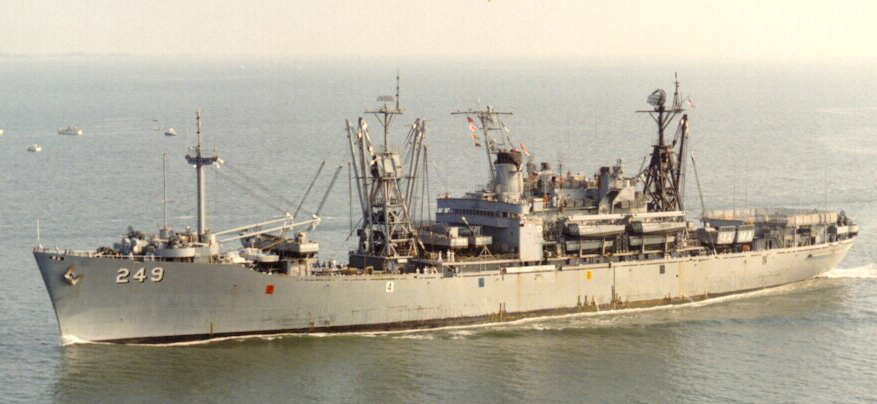
USS Francis Marion (LPA-249)

All Attack transports (APA) in service in 1969 were reclassed as Amphibious Transports (LPA), hull numbers were unchanged.

Bayfield class: MA type C3-S-A2

- USS Chilton (LPA-38)
- USS Fremont (LPA-44)
- USS Henrico (LPA-45)

Haskell class: MA type VC2-S-AP5

- USS Barnwell (LPA-132)
- USS Clinton (LPA-144)
- USS Collingsworth (LPA-146)
- USS Cottle (LPA-147)
- USS Lowndes (LPA-154)
- USS Napa (LPA-157)
- USS Gallatin (LPA-169)
- USS Hyde (LPA-173)
- USS Kingsbury (LPA-177)
- USS Lander (LPA-178)
- USS Lauderdale (LPA-179)
- USS Olmstead (LPA-188)
- USS Rutland (LPA-192)
- USS Sandoval (LPA-194)
- USS Logan (LPA-196)
- USS Magoffin (LPA-199)
- USS Sarasota (LPA-204)
- USS Talladega (LPA-208)
- USS Telfair (LPA-210)
- USS Montrose (LPA-212)
- USS Mountrail (LPA-213)
- USS Navarro (LPA-215)
- USS Okanogan (LPA-220)
- USS Pickaway (LPA-222)
- USS Pitt (LPA-223)
- USS Bingham (LPA-225)
- USS Renville (LPA-227)
- USS Rockbridge (LPA-228)
- USS Rockingham (LPA-229)
- USS Saint Croix (LPA-231)
- USS Sevier (LPA-233)
- USS Bollinger (LPA-234)
- USS Bottineau (LPA-235)
- USS Bronx (LPA-236)
- USS Bexar (LPA-237)
- USS Glynn (LPA-239)

Paul Revere class: MA type C4-S-1A

The Paul Revere class would be the first and only class of APA/LPA capable of 20 knots.

- USS Paul Revere (LPA-248)
- USS Francis Marion (LPA-249)

== Attack transport (APA) ==
Two transports with the hull symbol AP, USS George F. Elliott (AP-13) and USS Leedstown (AP-73), had been configured as attack transports but were sunk in 1942 before the introduction of the APA hull symbol on 1 February 1943.

All attack transports (APA) in service in 1969 were reclassified as amphibious transports (LPA).

Doyen class: MC type P1-S2-L2

- USS Doyen (APA-1), ex-AP-2

Harris class

- USS Harris (APA-2), ex-AP-8
- USS Zeilin (APA-3), ex-AP-9

McCawley class

- USS McCawley (APA-4), ex-AP-10, damaged in air attack 30 June 1943, 15 killed, sunk by friendly fire
- USS Barnett (APA-5), ex-AP-11

Heywood class

- USS Heywood (APA-6), ex-AP-12
- USS Fuller (APA-7), ex-AP-14
- USS William P. Biddle (APA-8), ex-AP-15
- USS Neville (APA-9), ex-AP-16

Harry Lee class

- USS Harry Lee (APA-10), ex-AP-17

Doyen class: MC type P1-S2-L2

- USS Feland (APA-11), ex-AP-18

Harris class

- USS Leonard Wood (APA-12), ex-AP-25
- USS Joseph T. Dickman (APA-13), ex-AP-26
- USS Hunter Liggett (APA-14), ex-AP-27
- USS Henry T. Allen (APA-15), ex-AP-30. later AG-90
- USS J. Franklin Bell (APA-16), ex-AP-34
- USS American Legion (APA-17), ex-AP-35

President Jackson class: MC type C3-A, C3-P or C3-P&C

- USS President Jackson (APA-18), ex-AP-37
- USS President Adams (APA-19), ex-AP-38
- USS President Hayes (APA-20), ex-AP-39

Crescent City class: MC type C3-P or C3-Delta

- USS Crescent City (APA-21), ex-AP-40, later TS Golden Bear

Joseph Hewes class

- USS Joseph Hewes (APA-22), ex-AP-50, torpedoed 11 November 1942 off Morocco, approximately 100 killed

John Penn class

- USS John Penn (APA-23), ex-AP-51

Edward Rutledge class

- USS Edward Rutledge (APA-24), ex-AP-52, torpedoed 12 November 1942 off Morocco, 15 killed

Arthur Middleton class: MC type C3-P&C

- USS Arthur Middleton (APA-25), ex-AP-55
- USS Samuel Chase (APA-26), ex-AP-56
- USS George Clymer (APA-27), ex-AP-57, Operation Crossroads nuclear test participant

Crescent City class: MC type C3-P or C3-Delta

- USS Charles Carroll (APA-28)

President Jackson class: MC type C3-A, C3-P or C3-P&C

- USS Thomas Stone (APA-29), ex-AP-59
- USS Thomas Jefferson (APA-30), ex-AP-60

Crescent City class: MC type C3-P or C3-Delta

- USS Monrovia (APA-31), ex-AP-64
- USS Calvert (APA-32), ex-AP-65

Bayfield class: MC type C3-S-A2

- USS Bayfield (APA-33), ex-AP-78, Operation Crossroads participant
- USS Bolivar (APA-34), ex-AP-79
- USS Callaway (APA-35), ex-AP-80
- USS Cambria (APA-36), ex-AP-81
- USS Cavalier (APA-37), ex-AP-82
- USS Chilton (APA-38), ex-AP-83, later LPA-38
- USS Clay (APA-39), ex-AP-84
- USS Custer (APA-40), ex-AP-85
- USS DuPage (APA-41), ex-AP-86
- USS Elmore (APA-42), ex-AP-87
- USS Fayette (APA-43), ex-AP-88
- USS Fremont (APA-44), ex-AP-89, later LPA-44
- USS Henrico (APA-45), ex-AP-90, Operation Crossroads participant, later LPA-45
- USS Knox (APA-46), ex-AP-91
- USS Lamar (APA-47), ex-AP-92
- USS Leon (APA-48), ex-AP-93

Ormsby class: MC type C2-S-B1

- USS Ormsby (APA-49), ex-AP-94
- USS Pierce (APA-50), ex-AP-95
- USS Sheridan (APA-51), ex-AP-96

Sumter class: MC type C2-S-E1

- USS Sumter (APA-52), ex-AP-97
- USS Warren (APA-53), ex-AP-98
- USS Wayne (APA-54), ex-AP-99

Windsor class: MC type C3-S-A1, C3-S-A3, or C3-S-A2

- USS Windsor (APA-55), ex-AP-100
- USS Leedstown (APA-56)

Gilliam class: MC type S4-SE2-BD1

The Gilliams were deliberately smaller than other classes of attack transports, to reduce the risks of having too many troops and large quantities of cargo in a single hull. After WW2 they were quickly disposed of as uneconomical.

- USS Gilliam (APA-57), Operation Crossroads target
- USS Appling (APA-58), Operation Crossroads target
- USS Audrain (APA-59)
- USS Banner (APA-60), Operation Crossroads target
- USS Barrow (APA-61), Operation Crossroads target
- USS Berrien (APA-62)
- USS Bladen (APA-63)
- USS Bracken (APA-64), Operation Crossroads target
- USS Briscoe (APA-65), Operation Crossroads target
- USS Brule (APA-66), Operation Crossroads target
- USS Burleson (APA-67), Operation Crossroads participant, later IX-67
- USS Butte (APA-68), Operation Crossroads target
- USS Carlisle (APA-69), Operation Crossroads target
- USS Carteret (APA-70), Operation Crossroads target
- USS Catron (APA-71), Operation Crossroads target
- USS Clarendon (APA-72)
- USS Cleburne (APA-73)
- USS Colusa (APA-74)
- USS Cortland (APA-75)
- USS Crenshaw (APA-76)
- USS Crittenden (APA-77), Operation Crossroads target
- USS Cullman (APA-78)
- USS Dawson (APA-79), Operation Crossroads target
- USS Elkhart (APA-80)
- USS Fallon (APA-81), Operation Crossroads target
- USS Fergus (APA-82)
- USS Fillmore (APA-83)
- USS Garrard (APA-84)
- USS Gasconade (APA-85), Operation Crossroads target
- USS Geneva (APA-86)
- USS Niagara (APA-87), Operation Crossroads target, scrapped
- USS Presidio (APA-88)

Frederick Funston class: MC type C3-S-A1

- USS Frederick Funston (APA-89), ex-AP-48, later T-AP-178
- USS James O'Hara (APA-90), ex-AP-49, later T-AP-179

Windsor class: MC type C3-S-A1, C3-S-A3, or C3-S-A2

- USS Adair (APA-91)

Bayfield class: MC type C3-S-A2

- USS Alpine (APA-92)
- USS Barnstable (APA-93)

Windsor class: MC type C3-S-A1, C3-S-A3, or C3-S-A2

- USS Baxter (APA-94)

Bayfield class: MC type C3-S-A2

- USS Burleigh (APA-95)

Sumter class: MC type C2-S-E1

- USS Cecil (APA-96)

Windsor class: MC type C3-S-A1, C3-S-A3, or C3-S-A2

- USS Dauphin (APA-97)
- USS Dutchess (APA-98)

Bayfield class: MC type C3-S-A2

- USS Dade (APA-99)
- USS Mendocino (APA-100)
- USS Montour (APA-101)
- USS Riverside (APA-102)

Windsor class: MC type C3-S-A1, C3-S-A3, or C3-S-A2

- USS Queens (APA-103)

Bayfield class: MC type C3-S-A2

- USS Westmoreland (APA-104)

Windsor class: MC type C3-S-A1, C3-S-A3, or C3-S-A2

- USS Shelby (APA-105)

Bayfield class: MC type C3-S-A2

- USS Hansford (APA-106)
- USS Goodhue (APA-107)
- USS Goshen (APA-108)
- USS Grafton (APA-109)

Windsor class: MC type C3-S-A1, C3-S-A3, or C3-S-A2

- USS Griggs (APA-110)
- USS Grundy (APA-111)

Bayfield class: MC type C3-S-A2

- USS Guilford (APA-112)
- USS Sitka (APA-113)
- USS Hamblen (APA-114)
- USS Hampton (APA-115)
- USS Hanover (APA-116)

Haskell class: MC type VC2-S-AP5

- USS Haskell (APA-117)
- USS Hendry (APA-118)
- USS Highlands (APA-119)
- USS Hinsdale (APA-120)
- USS Hocking (APA-121)
- USS Kenton (APA-122)
- USS Kittson (APA-123)
- USS La Grange (APA-124)
- USS Lanier (APA-125)
- USS St. Mary's (APA-126)
- USS Allendale (APA-127)
- USS Arenac (APA-128)
- USS Marvin H. McIntyre (APA-129)
- USS Attala (APA-130)
- USS Bandera (APA-131)
- USS Barnwell (APA-132), later LPA-132
- USS Beckham (APA-133)
- USS Bland (APA-134)
- USS Bosque (APA-135)
- USS Botetourt (APA-136)
- USS Bowie (APA-137)
- USS Braxton (APA-138)
- USS Broadwater (APA-139)
- USS Brookings (APA-140)
- USS Buckingham (APA-141)
- USS Clearfield (APA-142)
- USS Clermont (APA-143)
- USS Clinton (APA-144), later LPA-144
- USS Colbert (APA-145)
- USS Collingsworth (APA-146), later LPA-146
- USS Cottle (APA-147), later LPA-147
- USS Crockett (APA-148)
- USS Audubon (APA-149)
- USS Bergen (APA-150)
- USS La Porte (APA-151)
- USS Latimer (APA-152)
- USS Laurens (APA-153)
- USS Lowndes (APA-154), later LPA-154
- USS Lycoming (APA-155)
- USS Mellette (APA-156)
- USS Napa (APA-157), later LPA-157
- USS Newberry (APA-158)
- USS Darke (APA-159)
- USS Deuel (APA-160)
- USS Dickens (APA-161)
- USS Drew (APA-162)
- USS Eastland (APA-163)
- USS Edgecombe (APA-164)
- USS Effingham (APA-165)
- USS Fond du Lac (APA-166)
- USS Freestone (APA-167)
- USS Gage (APA-168)
- USS Gallatin (APA-169), later LPA-169
- USS Gosper (APA-170)
- USS Granville (APA-171)
- USS Grimes (APA-172)
- USS Hyde (APA-173), later LPA-173
- USS Jerauld (APA-174)
- USS Karnes (APA-175)
- USS Kershaw (APA-176)
- USS Kingsbury (APA-177), later LPA-177
- USS Lander (APA-178), later LPA-178
- USS Lauderdale (APA-179), later LPA-179
- USS Lavaca (APA-180)

APA-181 to APA-186, all unnamed, canceled, 1944

- USS Oconto (APA-187)
- USS Olmstead (APA-188), later LPA-188
- USS Oxford (APA-189)
- USS Pickens (APA-190)
- USS Pondera (APA-191)
- USS Rutland (APA-192), later LPA-192
- USS Sanborn (APA-193)
- USS Sandoval (APA-194), later LPA-194
- USS Lenawee (APA-195)
- USS Logan (APA-196), later LPA-196
- USS Lubbock (APA-197)
- USS McCracken (APA-198)
- USS Magoffin (APA-199), later LPA-199
- USS Marathon (APA-200)
- USS Menard (APA-201)
- USS Menifee (APA-202)
- USS Meriwether (APA-203)
- USS Sarasota (APA-204), later LPA-204
- USS Sherburne (APA-205)
- USS Sibley (APA-206)
- USS Mifflin (APA-207)
- USS Talladega (APA-208), later LPA-208
- USS Tazewell (APA-209)
- USS Telfair (APA-210), later LPA-210
- USS Missoula (APA-211)
- USS Montrose (APA-212), later LPA-212
- USS Mountrail (APA-213), later LPA-213
- USS Natrona (APA-214)
- USS Navarro (APA-215), Project SHAD chemical/biological test participant, later LPA-215
- USS Neshoba (APA-216)
- USS New Kent (APA-217)
- USS Noble (APA-218)
- USS Okaloosa (APA-219)
- USS Okanogan (APA-220), Project SHAD participant, later LPA-220
- USS Oneida (APA-221)
- USS Pickaway (APA-222), Operation Sandstone nuclear test participant, later LPA-222
- USS Pitt (APA-223), later LPA-223
- USS Randall (APA-224)
- USS Bingham (APA-225), later LPA-225
- USS Rawlins (APA-226)
- USS Renville (APA-227), Operation Crossroads participant, later LPA-227
- USS Rockbridge (APA-228), Operation Crossroads participant, later LPA-228
- USS Rockingham (APA-229), Operation Crossroads participant, later LPA-229
- USS Rockwall (APA-230), Operation Crossroads participant
- USS Saint Croix (APA-231), Operation Crossroads participant, later LPA-231
- USS San Saba (APA-232)
- USS Sevier (APA-233), later LPA-233
- USS Bollinger (APA-234), later LPA-234
- USS Bottineau (APA-235), Operation Crossroads participant, later LPA-235
- USS Bronx (APA-236), later LPA-236
- USS Bexar (APA-237), Operation Crossroads participant, later LPA-237
- USS Dane (APA-238)
- USS Glynn (APA-239), later LPA-239
- USS Harnett (APA-240) *
- USS Hempstead (APA-241) *
- USS Iredell (APA-242) *
- USS Luzerne (APA-243) *
- USS Medera (APA-244) *
- USS Maricopa (APA-245) *
- USS McLennan (APA-246) *
- USS Mecklenburg (APA-247) *

(* cancelled in 1945)

Paul Revere class: MA type C4-S-1A

The Paul Revere class would be the first and only class of APA/LPA capable of 20 knots.

- USS Paul Revere (APA-248), later LPA-248
- USS Francis Marion (APA-249), later LPA-249

== Amphibious transport, small (LPR) ==
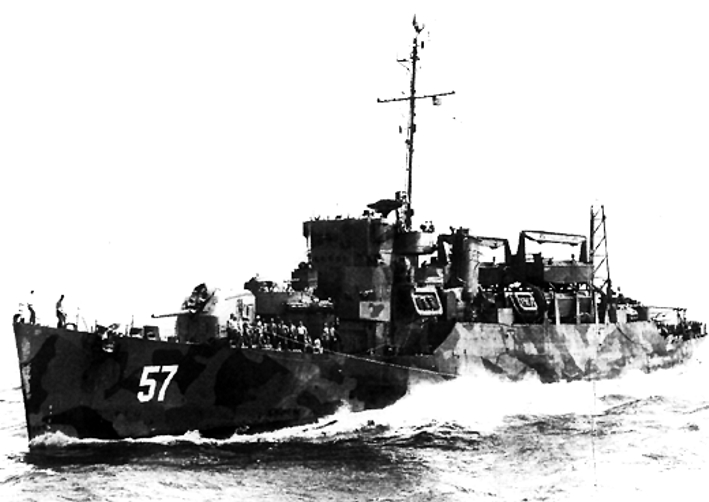
USS Barber (LPR-57)

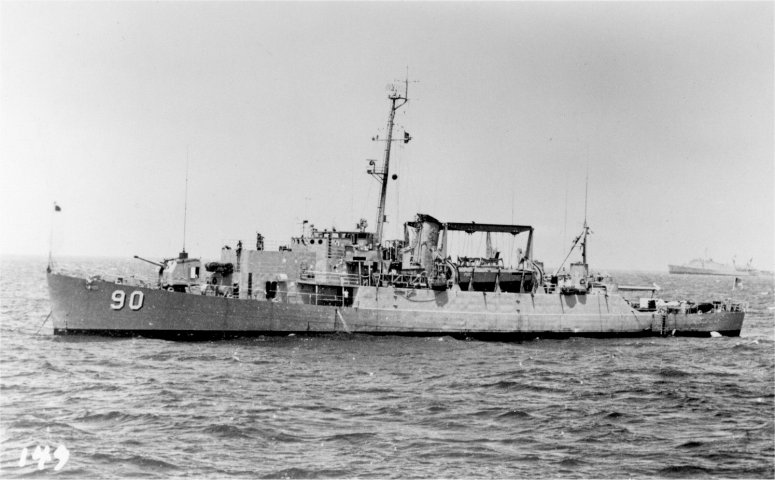
USS Kirwin (LPR-90)

In 1969 the remaining destroyer escorts which had been converted into High-speed transports (APD)s were reclassified as Amphibious transports, small (LPR)s with no change of hull number.

Charles Lawrence class

- USS Laning (LPR-55)
- USS Barber (LPR-57)
- USS Hollis (LPR-86)

Crosley class

- USS Ruchamkin (LPR-89)
- USS Kirwin (LPR-90)
- USS Ringness (LPR-100)
- USS Knudson (LPR-101)
- USS Beverly W. Reid (LPR-119)
- USS Diachenko (LPR-123)
- USS Horace A. Bass (LPR-124)
- USS Begor (LPR-127)
- USS Balduck (LPR-132)
- USS Weiss (LPR-135)

== High-speed transport (APD) ==
High-speed Transports (APD) were converted destroyers and destroyer escorts; they received the US hull classification symbol APD: "AP" for transport and "D" for destroyer. In 1969, the remaining ships were reclassified as Amphibious transport, small (LPR) with no change of hull numbers. This classification is not to be confused with hull code "HST", also for "High Speed Transport", previously assigned only to experimental high-speed catamaran designs, and high-speed catamarans chartered from private ferry companies.

Caldwell class

- USS Manley (APD-1), ex-DD-74

Wickes class

- USS Colhoun (APD-2), ex-DD-85, sunk in air attack 30 August 1942, 51 killed
- USS Gregory (APD-3), ex-DD-82, sunk by naval gunfire 5 September 1942, 24 killed
- USS Little (APD-4), ex-DD-79, sunk by naval gunfire 5 September 1942, 65 killed
- USS McKean (APD-5), ex-DD-90, sunk in air attack 17 November 1943, 116 killed
- USS Stringham (APD-6), ex-DD-83
- USS Talbot (APD-7), ex-DD-114
- USS Waters (APD-8), ex-DD-115
- USS Dent (APD-9), ex-DD-116

Clemson class

- USS Brooks (APD-10), ex-DD-232, heavily damaged by Kamikaze 6 January 1945 (never repaired and decommissioned in August 1945), 8 killed
- USS Gilmer (APD-11), ex-DD-233
- USS Humphreys (APD-12), ex-DD-236
- USS Sands (APD-13), ex-DD-243

Wickes-class

- USS Schley (APD-14), ex-DD-103
- USS Kilty (APD-15), ex-DD-137
- USS Ward (APD-16), ex-DD-139 sunk by Kamikaze 7 December 1944
- USS Crosby (APD-17), ex-DD-164

Clemson-class

- USS Kane (APD-18), ex-DD-235

Wickes-class

- USS Tattnall (APD-19), ex-DD-125
- USS Roper (APD-20), ex-DD-147
- USS Dickerson (APD-21), ex-DD-157, scuttled after Kamikaze attack 4 April 1945, 54 killed
- USS Herbert (APD-22), ex-DD-160

Clemson-class

- USS Overton (APD-23), ex-DD-239
- USS Noa (APD-24), ex-DD-343, sunk in collision 12 September 1944, no deaths

Wickes-class

- USS Rathburne (APD-25), ex-DD-113

Clemson-class

- USS McFarland (APD-26), DD-237 — conversion canceled
- USS Williamson (APD-27), ex-DD-244
- USS Hulbert (APD-28), DD-342 — conversion canceled
- USS Barry (APD-29), ex-DD-248, sunk by Kamikaze 21 June 1945
- USS Clemson (APD-31), ex-DD-186
- USS Goldsborough (APD-32), ex-DD-188
- USS George E. Badger (APD-33), ex-DD-196
- USS Belknap (APD-34), ex-DD-251, heavily damaged by Kamikaze 11 January 1945 (never repaired and decommissioned in August 1945), 38 killed
- USS Osmond Ingram (APD-35), ex-DD-255
- USS Greene (APD-36), ex-DD-266, ex-AVD-13, wrecked by Typhoon Louise Okinawa October 1945

Charles Lawrence class

- USS Charles Lawrence (APD-37)
- USS Daniel T. Griffin (APD-38)
- USS Barr (APD-39)
- USS Bowers (APD-40)
- USS England (APD-41)
- USS Gantner (APD-42)
- USS George W. Ingram (APD-43)
- USS Ira Jeffery (APD-44)
- USS Lee Fox (APD-45)
- USS Amesbury (APD-46)
- USS Bates (APD-47), sunk by Kamikaze 25 May 1945, 21 killed or missing
- USS Blessman (APD-48)
- USS Joseph E. Campbell (APD-49)
- USS Sims (APD-50)
- USS Hopping (APD-51)
- USS Reeves (APD-52)
- USS Hubbard (APD-53)
- USS Chase (APD-54)
- USS Laning (APD-55)
- USS Loy (APD-56)
- USS Barber (APD-57)
- USS Witter (APD-58)
- USS Newman (APD-59)
- USS Liddle (APD-60)
- USS Kephart (APD-61)
- USS Cofer (APD-62)
- USS Lloyd (APD-63)
- USS Scott (APD-64)
- USS Burke (APD-65)
- USS Enright (APD-66)
- USS Jenks (APD-67)
- USS Durik (APD-68)
- USS Yokes (APD-69)
- USS Pavlic (APD-70)
- USS Odum (APD-71)
- USS Jack C. Robinson (APD-72)
- USS Bassett (APD-73)
- USS John P. Gray (APD-74)
- USS Weber (APD-75)
- USS Schmitt (APD-76)
- USS Frament (APD-77)
- USS Bull (APD-78)
- USS Bunch (APD-79)
- USS Hayter (APD-80)
- USS Tatum (APD-81)
- USS Borum (APD-82)
- USS Maloy (APD-83)
- USS Haines (APD-84)
- USS Runels (APD-85)
- USS Hollis (APD-86)

Crosley class

- USS Crosley (APD-87)
- USS Cread (APD-88)
- USS Ruchamkin (APD-89)
- USS Kirwin (APD-90)
- USS Kinzer (APD-91)
- USS Register (APD-92)
- USS Brock (APD-93)
- USS John Q. Roberts (APD-94)
- USS William M. Hobby (APD-95)
- USS Ray K. Edwards (APD-96)
- USS Arthur L. Bristol (APD-97)
- USS Truxtun (APD-98)
- USS Upham (APD-99)
- USS Ringness (APD-100)
- USS Knudson (APD-101)
- USS Rednour (APD-102)
- USS Tollberg (APD-103)
- USS William J. Pattison (APD-104)
- USS Myers (APD-105)
- USS Walter B. Cobb (APD-106)
- USS Earle B. Hall (APD-107)
- USS Harry L. Corl (APD-108)
- USS Belet (APD-109)
- USS Julius A. Raven (APD-110)
- USS Walsh (APD-111)
- USS Hunter Marshall (APD-112)
- USS Earheart (APD-113)
- USS Walter S. Gorka (APD-114)
- USS Rogers Blood (APD-115)
- USS Francovich (APD-116)
- USS Joseph M. Auman (APD-117)
- USS Don O. Woods (APD-118)
- USS Beverly W. Reid (APD-119)
- USS Kline (APD-120)
- USS Raymon W. Herndon (APD-121)
- USS Scribner (APD-122)
- USS Diachenko (APD-123)
- USS Horace A. Bass (APD-124)
- USS Wantuck (APD-125)
- USS Gosselin (APD-126)
- USS Begor (APD-127), Operation Crossroads nuclear test participant
- USS Cavallaro (APD-128)
- USS Donald W. Wolf (APD-129)
- USS Cook (APD-130)
- USS Walter X. Young (APD-131)
- USS Balduck (APD-132)
- USS Burdo (APD-133)
- USS Kleinsmith (APD-134)
- USS Weiss (APD-135)
- USS Carpellotti (APD-136)
- USS DeLong (APD-137)
- USS Coates (APD-138)
- USS Bray (APD-139)

== Transport submarine (LPSS) ==
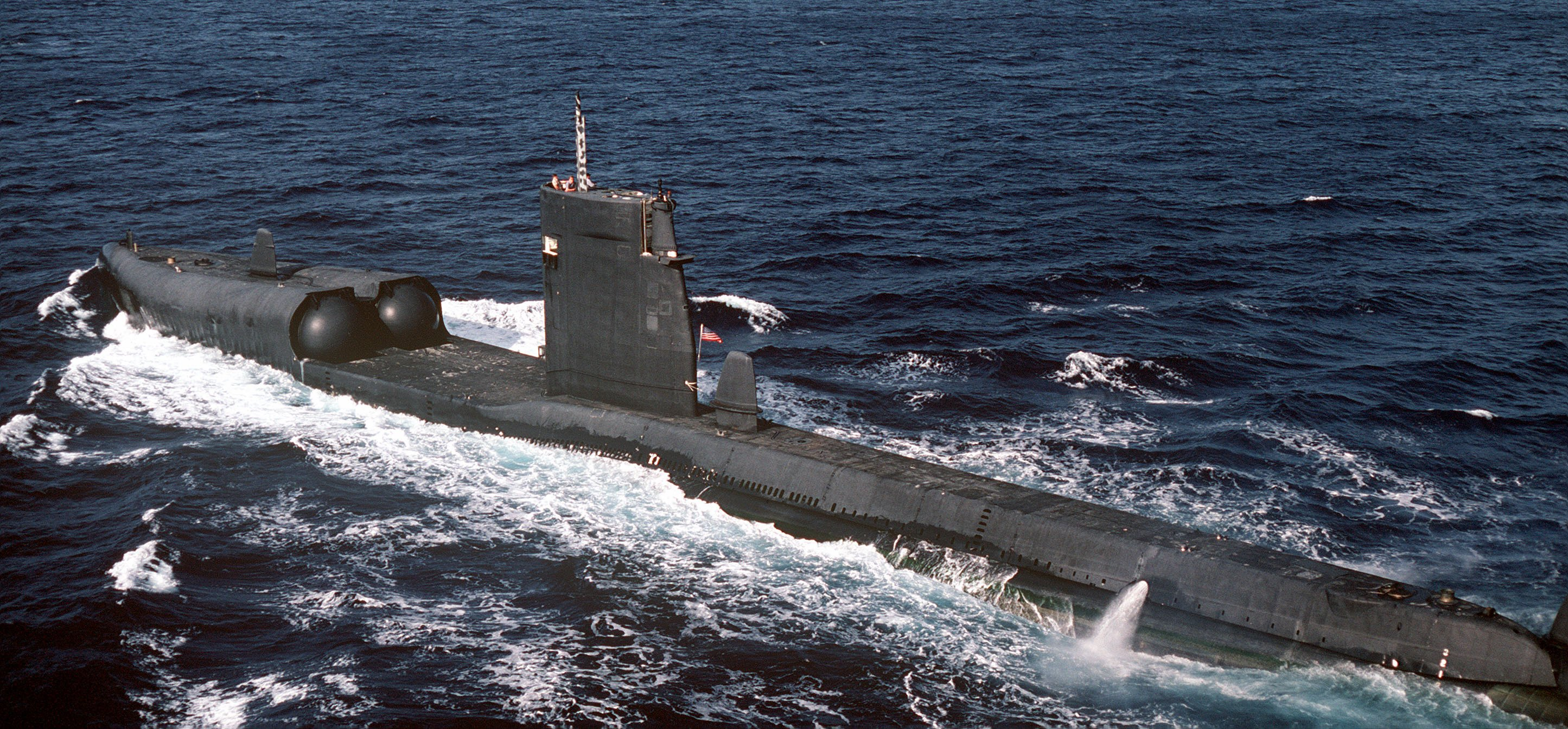
USS Grayback (LPSS-574)

- USS Tunny (LPSS-282), ex-APSS-282
- USS Perch (LPSS-313), ex-APSS-313, later IXSS-313
- USS Sealion (LPSS-315), ex-APSS-315
- USS Grayback (LPSS-574), ex-APSS-574

== Transport submarine (APS, ASSP, APSS) ==
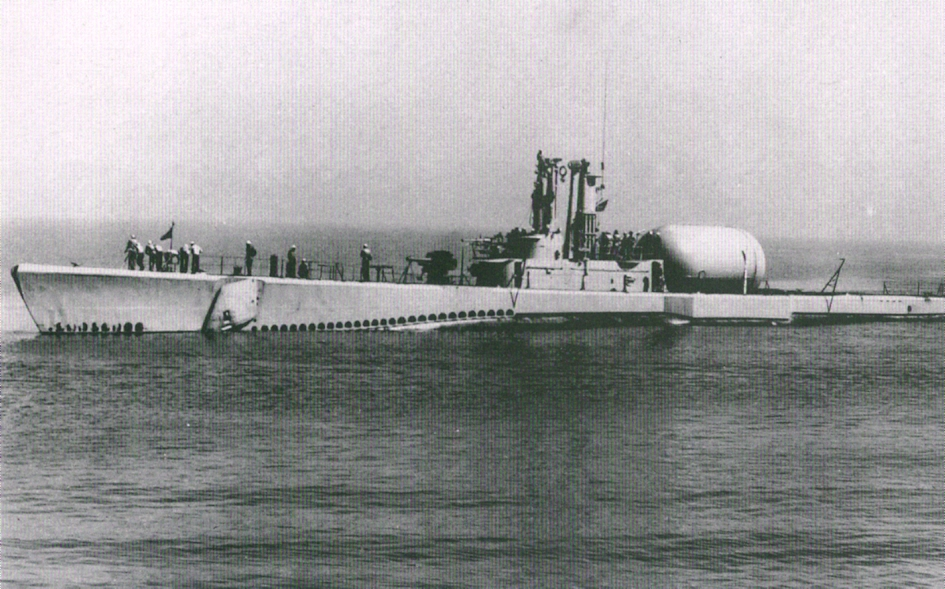
USS Perch (ASSP-313)

- USS Argonaut (APS-1), ex-SM-1, sunk by Japanese destroyers off Rabaul on 10 January 1943, 102 killed
- USS Tunny (APSS-282), ex-SS-282, SSG-282, later LPSS-282
- USS Perch (APSS-313), ex-SS-313, SSP-313, ASSP-313, later LPSS-313
- USS Sealion (APSS-315), ex-SS-315, SSP-315, ASSP-315, later LPSS-315
- USS Grayback (APSS-574), ex-SS-574, SSG-574, later LPSS-574

== Inshore fire support ship (LFR) ==
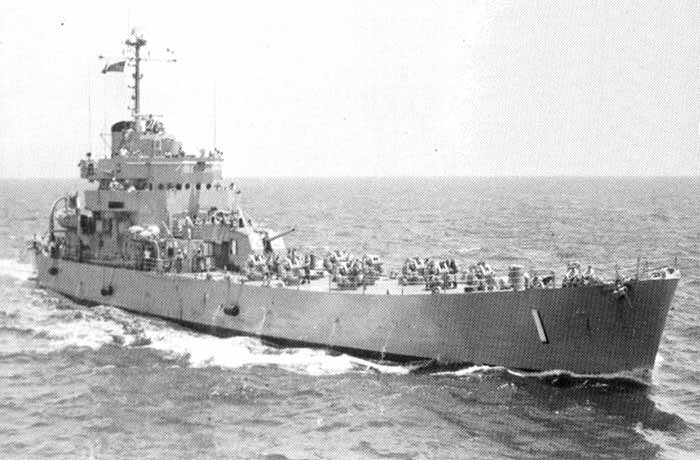
USS Carronade LFR-1

- USS Carronade (LFR-1), ex-IFS-1
- USS Big Black River (LFR-401)
- USS Black Warrior River (LFR-404)
- USS Broadkill River (LFR-405)
- USS Clarion River (LFR-409)
- USS Desplaines River (LFR-412)
- USS Lamoille River (LFR-512)
- USS Laramie River (LFR-513)
- USS Owyhee River (LFR-515)
- USS Red River (LFR-522)
- USS St. Francis River (LFR-525)
- USS Smoky Hill River (LFR-531)
- USS White River (LFR-536)

== Landing craft, control (LCC) ==
Not to be confused with the later Amphibious command ship (LCC).

During World War II a number of small boats were built to direct the movements of landing craft as they approached beaches. These were 56 feet in length, displaced 30 tons, and ran 13-16 knots in speed. They were equipped with multiple radios and SO radar (the same radar as on PT boats). During the invasion of southern France they were used to control drone minesweepers.

== Landing craft infantry (LCI) ==
The United States Navy built 932 Landing Craft Infantry ships in World War II.

== Landing Craft Mechanized (LCM) ==
The United States Navy built 11,144 landing craft Motorized, designated Landing Craft Mechanized (LCM) in World War II.

== Landing craft support (large) (Mark 3), a.k.a. LCS(L)(3) ==
- USS LCS(L)(3)-1
- USS LCS(L)(3)-2
- USS LCS(L)(3)-3
- USS LCS(L)(3)-4
- USS LCS(L)(3)-5
- USS LCS(L)(3)-6
- USS LCS(L)(3)-7
- USS LCS(L)(3)-8
- USS LCS(L)(3)-9
- USS LCS(L)(3)-10
- USS LCS(L)(3)-11
- USS LCS(L)(3)-12
- USS LCS(L)(3)-13
- USS LCS(L)(3)-14
- USS LCS(L)(3)-15
- USS LCS(L)(3)-16
- USS LCS(L)(3)-17
- USS LCS(L)(3)-18
- USS LCS(L)(3)-19
- USS LCS(L)(3)-20
- USS LCS(L)(3)-21
- USS LCS(L)(3)-22
- USS LCS(L)(3)-23
- USS LCS(L)(3)-24
- USS LCS(L)(3)-25
- USS LCS(L)(3)-26
- USS LCS(L)(3)-27
- USS LCS(L)(3)-28
- USS LCS(L)(3)-29
- USS LCS(L)(3)-30
- USS LCS(L)(3)-31
- USS LCS(L)(3)-32
- USS LCS(L)(3)-33
- USS LCS(L)(3)-34
- USS LCS(L)(3)-35
- USS LCS(L)(3)-36
- USS LCS(L)(3)-37
- USS LCS(L)(3)-38
- USS LCS(L)(3)-39
- USS LCS(L)(3)-40
- USS LCS(L)(3)-41
- USS LCS(L)(3)-42
- USS LCS(L)(3)-43
- USS LCS(L)(3)-44
- USS LCS(L)(3)-45
- USS LCS(L)(3)-46
- USS LCS(L)(3)-47
- USS LCS(L)(3)-48
- USS LCS(L)(3)-49
- USS LCS(L)(3)-50
- USS LCS(L)(3)-51
- USS LCS(L)(3)-52
- USS LCS(L)(3)-53
- USS LCS(L)(3)-54
- USS LCS(L)(3)-55
- USS LCS(L)(3)-56
- USS LCS(L)(3)-57
- USS LCS(L)(3)-58
- USS LCS(L)(3)-59
- USS LCS(L)(3)-60
- USS LCS(L)(3)-61
- USS LCS(L)(3)-62
- USS LCS(L)(3)-63
- USS LCS(L)(3)-64
- USS LCS(L)(3)-65
- USS LCS(L)(3)-66
- USS LCS(L)(3)-67
- USS LCS(L)(3)-68
- USS LCS(L)(3)-69
- USS LCS(L)(3)-70
- USS LCS(L)(3)-71
- USS LCS(L)(3)-72
- USS LCS(L)(3)-73
- USS LCS(L)(3)-74
- USS LCS(L)(3)-75
- USS LCS(L)(3)-76
- USS LCS(L)(3)-77
- USS LCS(L)(3)-78
- USS LCS(L)(3)-79
- USS LCS(L)(3)-80
- USS LCS(L)(3)-81
- USS LCS(L)(3)-82
- USS LCS(L)(3)-83
- USS LCS(L)(3)-84
- USS LCS(L)(3)-85
- USS LCS(L)(3)-86
- USS LCS(L)(3)-87
- USS LCS(L)(3)-88
- USS LCS(L)(3)-89
- USS LCS(L)(3)-90
- USS LCS(L)(3)-91
- USS LCS(L)(3)-92
- USS LCS(L)(3)-93
- USS LCS(L)(3)-94
- USS LCS(L)(3)-95
- USS LCS(L)(3)-96
- USS LCS(L)(3)-97
- USS LCS(L)(3)-98
- USS LCS(L)(3)-99
- USS LCS(L)(3)-100
- USS LCS(L)(3)-101
- USS LCS(L)(3)-102, museum ship
- USS LCS(L)(3)-103
- USS LCS(L)(3)-104
- USS LCS(L)(3)-105
- USS LCS(L)(3)-106
- USS LCS(L)(3)-107
- USS LCS(L)(3)-108
- USS LCS(L)(3)-109
- USS LCS(L)(3)-111
- USS LCS(L)(3)-112
- USS LCS(L)(3)-113
- USS LCS(L)(3)-114
- USS LCS(L)(3)-115
- USS LCS(L)(3)-116
- USS LCS(L)(3)-117
- USS LCS(L)(3)-118
- USS LCS(L)(3)-119
- USS LCS(L)(3)-120
- USS LCS(L)(3)-121
- USS LCS(L)(3)-122
- USS LCS(L)(3)-123
- USS LCS(L)(3)-124
- USS LCS(L)(3)-125
- USS LCS(L)(3)-126
- USS LCS(L)(3)-127
- USS LCS(L)(3)-128
- USS LCS(L)(3)-129
- USS LCS(L)(3)-130

== Landing craft tank (LCT) ==
The United States Navy built 1,394 landing craft tank, designated Landing Craft Tank (LCT) in World War II. Those that were still in use in 1949 were redesignated as Landing Craft, Utility (LCU).

== Landing craft utility (LCU) ==
The United States Navy built the LCU 1466, 1610 and 1627 classes after World War II. Seventy old LCUs (likely ex-LCTs) were retired from amphibious duties and reclassified as Harbor utility craft (YFU).

== Landing ship medium (LSM) ==
Towards the end of World War II the United States Navy built 558 Landing Ship Medium (LSM) type vessels across three classes. They were originally designed under the classification Landing Craft Tank - Mark 7 but were reclassified after exceeding 200 feet in length.

As of February 2023 the US Marine Corps has proposed the purchase of 18 to 35 modern LSMs; this LSM concept was previously known as the Light Amphibious Warship (LAW).

== Landing ship, tank (LST) ==
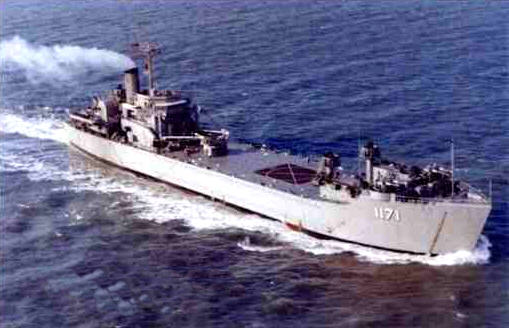
USS De Soto County (LST-1171)

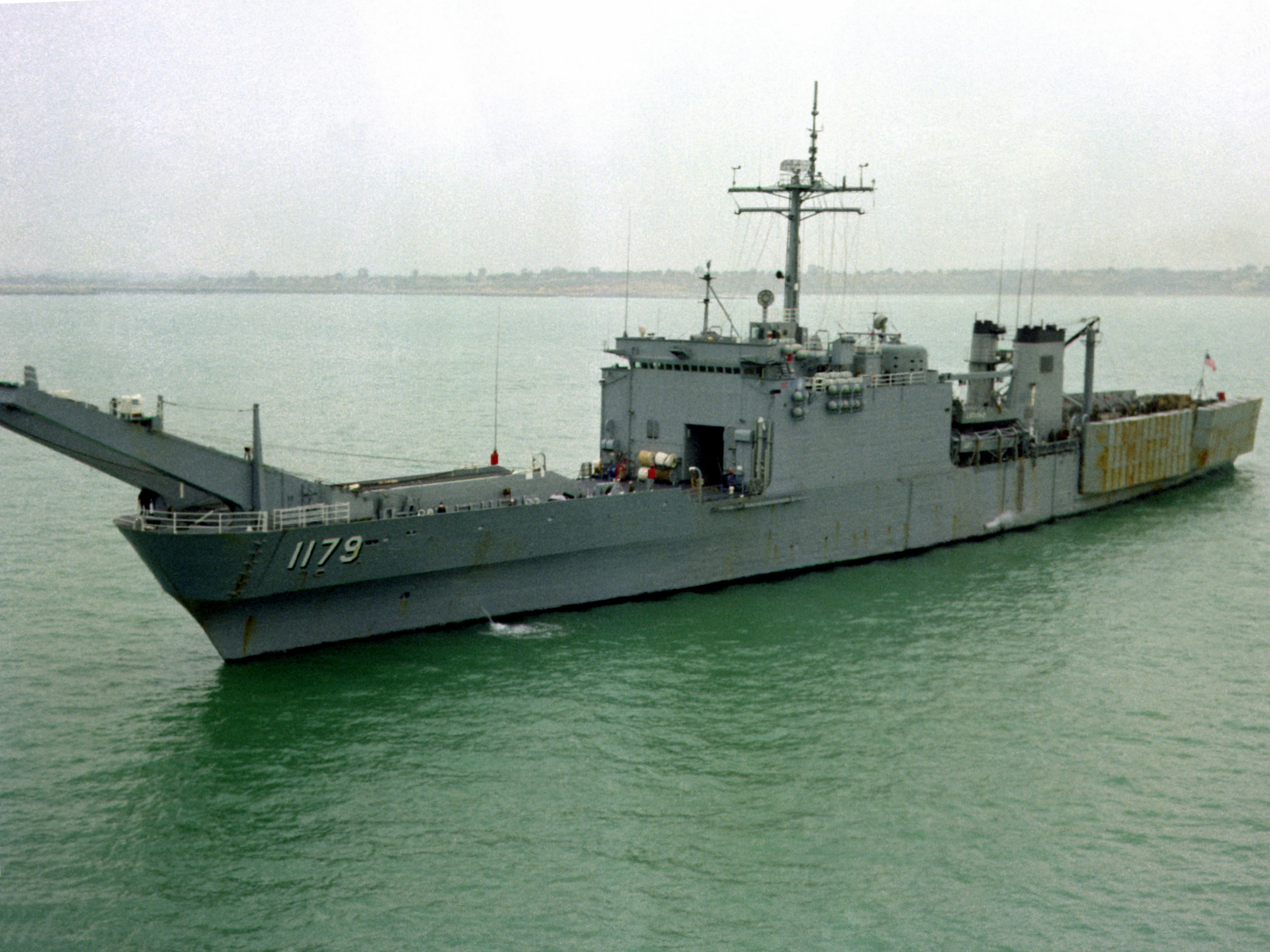
USS Newport (LST-1179)

The United States Navy built nearly 1,200 tank landing ships, classified as "Landing Ship, Tank" or "LST", from the World War II-era up through the early 1970s. The Newport class, which entered service in 1969, would be the last class built and the only class capable of exceeding 20 knots. The 1987 introduction of Landing Craft Air Cushion (LCAC) — which allowed for over-the-horizon amphibious landings onto a far larger number of beaches — made LSTs obsolete, but they remained with the fleet for another decade because they were the only means by which the hundreds of thousands of gallons of motor vehicle fuel needed by a Marine Expeditionary Force could be landed. Only the development of tankers with the Offshore Petroleum Discharge System (OPDS) and the later development of special fuel bladders which gave the LCACs a tanker capability allowed for their retirement.

== Atlantic tank landing ship (ATL) ==
The ATL hull classification was short-lived; it was changed to Landing Ship Tank (LST).

- USS ATL-1, later USS LST-1

== Vehicle landing ship (LSV) ==
USS Montauk (LSV-6)

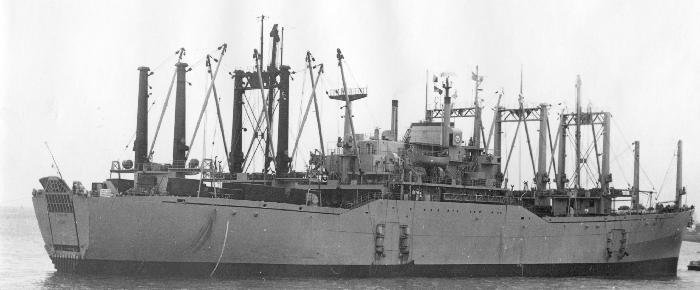
USNS Comet (T-AK-269)

The World War II LSVs were converted from surplus minelayers (CM) and netlayers (AN) into ships which could carry and launch amphibious vehicles. After the war most were slated to become mine countermeasures support ships (MCS), but only two were actually converted.

- USS Catskill (LSV-1), former CM-6, AP-106, later MCS-1
- USS Ozark (LSV-2), former CM-7, AP-107, later MCS-2
- USS Osage (LSV-3), former AN-3, AP-108, later MCS-3 canceled
- USS Saugus (LSV-4), former AN-4, AP-109, later MCS-4 canceled
- USS Monitor (LSV-5), former AN-1, AP-160, later MCS-5 canceled
- USS Montauk (LSV-6), former AN-2, AP-161, later AKN-6

The post-WW2 LSVs were among the first roll-on/roll-off cargo ships.

- USNS Comet (T-LSV-7), former T-AK-269, later T-AKR-7
- USNS Taurus (T-LSV-8), former LSD-23, T-AK-273
- USNS Sea Lift (T-LSV-9), later T-AKR-9

== Patrol craft, control (PCC) ==
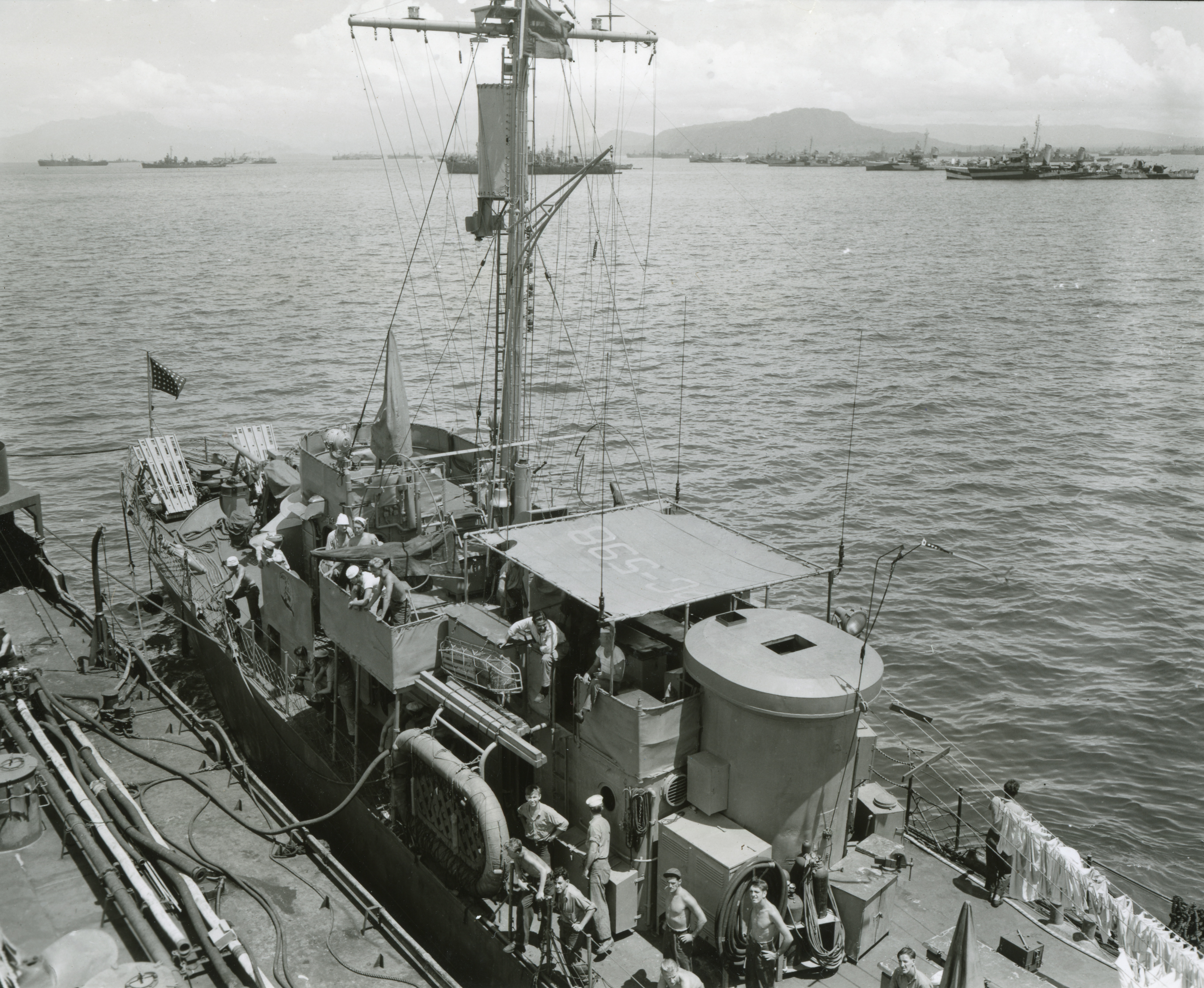
USS PCC-598

Thirty-five PC-461-class submarine chasers were converted into amphibious landing control vessel during World War II and reclassified as Patrol Craft, Control after the war. Extra personnel (eight radiomen, two signalmen, one quartermaster and two communications officers), accommodations and improved radar and communications equipment were added. PCs proved exceptionally adept as Control Vessels, guiding waves of landing craft during numerous amphibious landings in the European and Pacific Theaters.

- PCC-549, ex-PC-549
- PCC-555, ex-PC-555
- PCC-563, ex-PC-563
- PCC-578, ex-PC-578
- USS Lenoir (PCC-582), ex-PC-582
- USS Houghton (PCC-588), ex-PC-588
- USS Metropolis (PCC-589), ex-PC-589
- PCC-598, ex-PC-598
- PCC-802, ex-PC-802, later to Republic of Korea as Sam Gak San (PC-703)
- PCC-803, ex-PC-803
- PCC-1136, ex-PC-1136
- PCC-1137, ex-PC-1137
- USS Escandido (PCC-1169), ex-PC-1169
- USS Guymon (PCC-1177), ex-PC-1177
- USS Kewaunee (PCC-1178), ex-PC-1178
- USS Martinez (PCC-1244), ex-PC-1244
- USS Ukiah (PCC-1251), ex-PC-1251

== Patrol craft sweeper, control (PCSC) ==
Thirteen Patrol Craft Sweepers (which were built on 134-foot YMS-1-class minesweeper hulls) were converted into amphibious landing control vessel during World War II and reclassified as Patrol Craft Sweeper, Control.

- USS PCSC-1379, ex-PCS-1379
- USS PCSC-1389, ex-PCS-1389
- USS PCSC-1390, ex-PCS-1390
- USS PCSC-1391, ex-PCS-1391
- USS PCSC-1402, ex-PCS-1402
- USS PCSC-1403, ex-PCS-1403
- USS PCSC-1418, ex-PCS-1418
- USS PCSC-1421, ex-PCS-1421
- USS PCSC-1429, ex-PCS-1429
- USS PCSC-1452, ex-PCS-1452
- USS PCSC-1455, ex-PCS-1455
- USS PCSC-1460, ex-PCS-1460
- USS PCSC-1461, ex-PCS-1461

== Expeditionary fast transport (EPF) ==
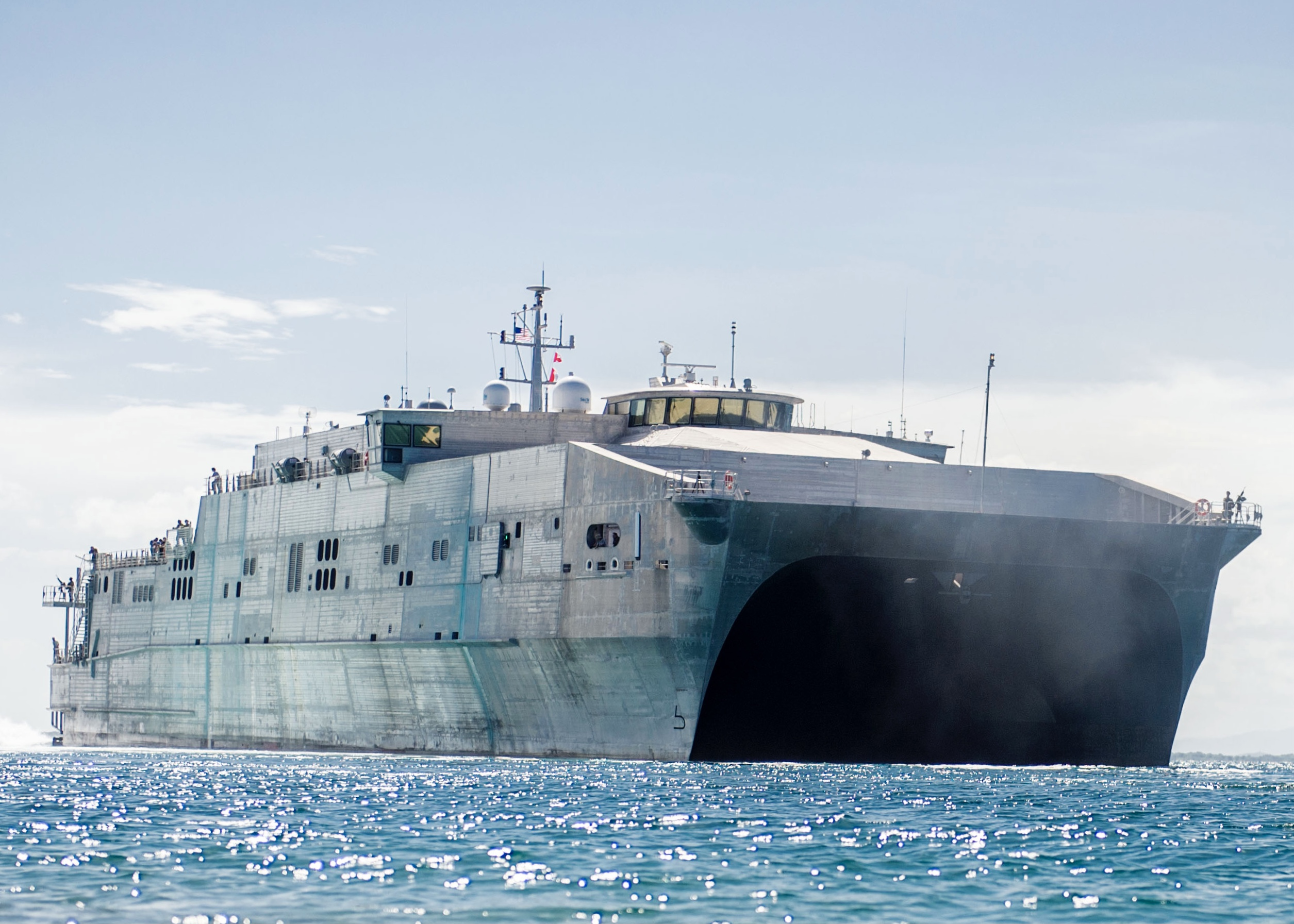
USNS Spearhead (T-EPF-1)

Spearhead class

- USNS Spearhead (T-EPF-1) [I]
- USNS Choctaw County (T-EPF-2)
- USNS Millinocket (T-EPF-3) [I]
- USNS Fall River (T-EPF-4) [I]
- USNS Trenton (T-EPF-5) [A]
- USNS Brunswick (T-EPF-6) [A]
- USNS Carson City (T-EPF-7) [A]
- USNS Yuma (T-EPF-8) [A]
- USNS City of Bismarck (T-EPF-9) [A]
- USNS Burlington (T-EPF-10) [A]
- USNS Puerto Rico (T-EPF-11) [A]
- USNS Newport (T-EPF-12) [A]
- USNS Apalachicola (T-EPF-13) [A]
- USNS Cody (T-EPF-14) [A]
- USNS Point Loma (T-EPF-15) [P]
- USNS Lansing (T-EPF-16) [P]

In January 2023, the Navy announced that three Expeditionary Medical Ships (EMS) had been approved in the 2023 military budget. By May 2023 the three ships had been officially reclassified from EPF to EMS.

- (T-EPF-17), later USNS Bethesda (T-EMS-1)
- (T-EPF-18), later USNS Balboa (T-EMS-2)
- (T-EPF-19), later USNS Portsmouth (T-EMS-3)

== Expeditionary mobile base (ESB) ==
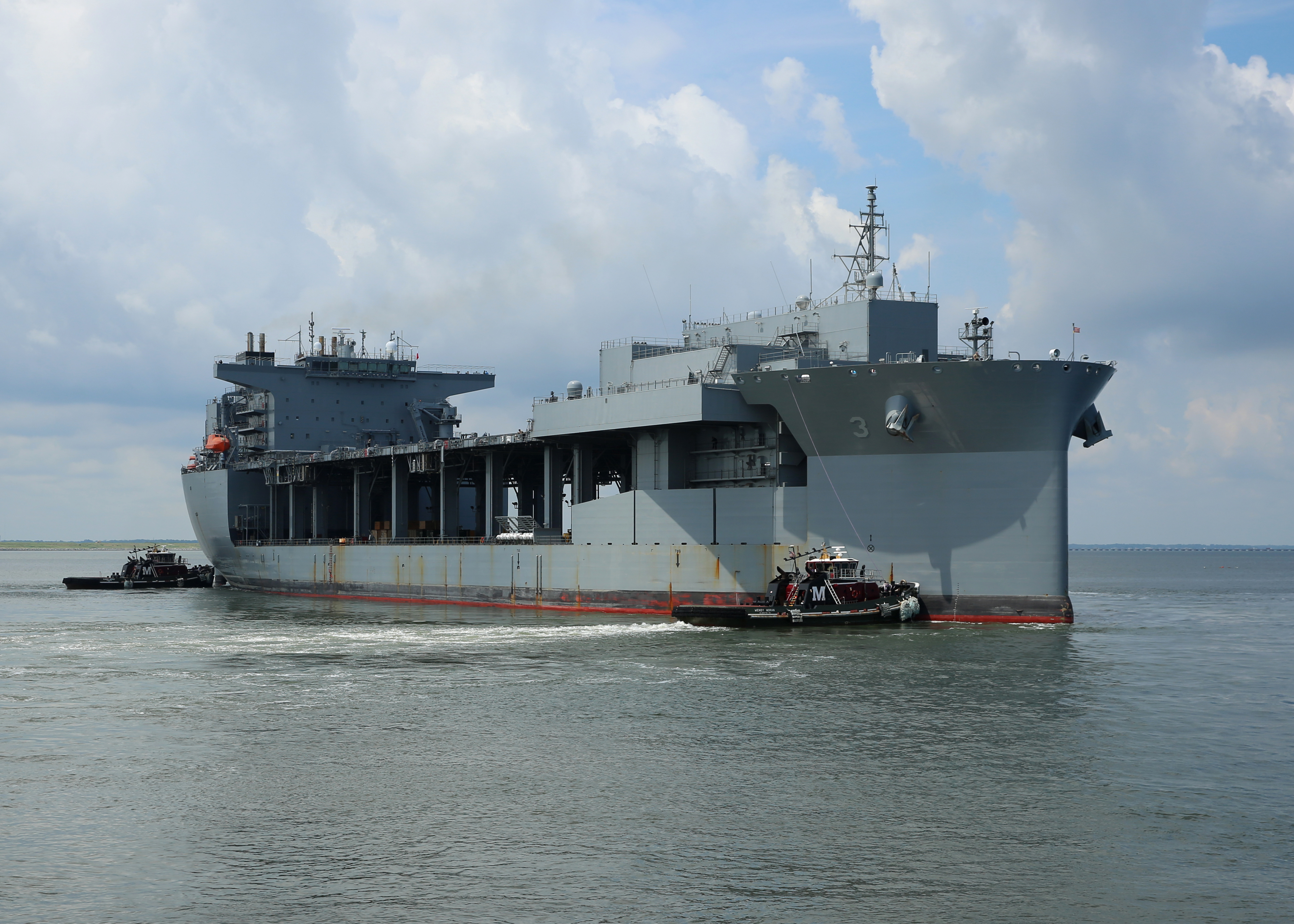
USS Lewis B. Puller ESB-3

Lewis B. Puller class

Note there is no ESB-1 or ESB-2, the ESB and ESD hulls have one sequence.

- USS Lewis B. Puller (ESB-3) [A]
- USS Hershel "Woody" Williams (ESB-4) [A]
- USS Miguel Keith (ESB-5) [A]
- USS John L. Canley (ESB-6) [A]
- USS Robert E. Simanek (ESB-7) [P]
- USS Hector A. Cafferata Jr. (ESB-8) [P]

== Afloat forward staging base (AFSB) ==
The Afloat forward staging base (AFSB) was reclassified as the Expeditionary mobile base (ESB) on 4 September 2015.

- USS Ponce (AFSB-15), ex-LPD-15
- USS Lewis B. Puller (AFSB-1), ex-MLP-3, later ESB-3

== Expeditionary transfer dock (ESD) ==
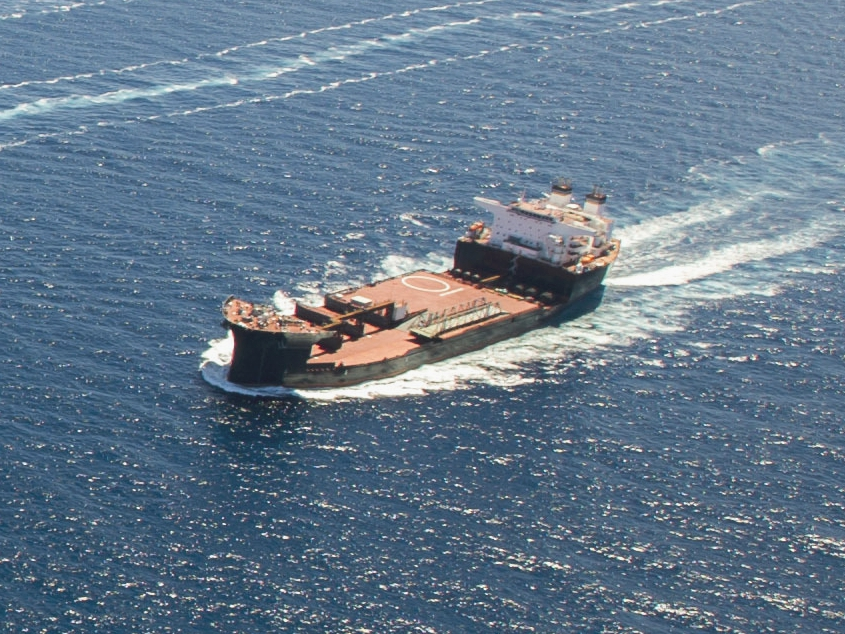
USNS Montford Point (T-ESD-1)

Montford Point class

- USNS Montford Point (T-ESD-1) [A]
- USNS John Glenn (T-ESD-2) [A]

== Mobile landing platform (MLP) ==
The Mobile landing platform (MLP) was reclassified as the Expeditionary transfer dock (ESD) on 4 September 2015.

- USNS Montford Point (T-MLP-1), later T-ESD-1
- USNS John Glenn (T-MLP-2), later T-ESD-2
- USNS Lewis B. Puller (T-MLP-3) later AFSB-1, ESB-3

== Barracks ships ==
Barracks ships are auxiliaries that are used in a variety of roles, not only for amphibious warfare.

== Offshore petroleum distribution system (OPDS) ships ==
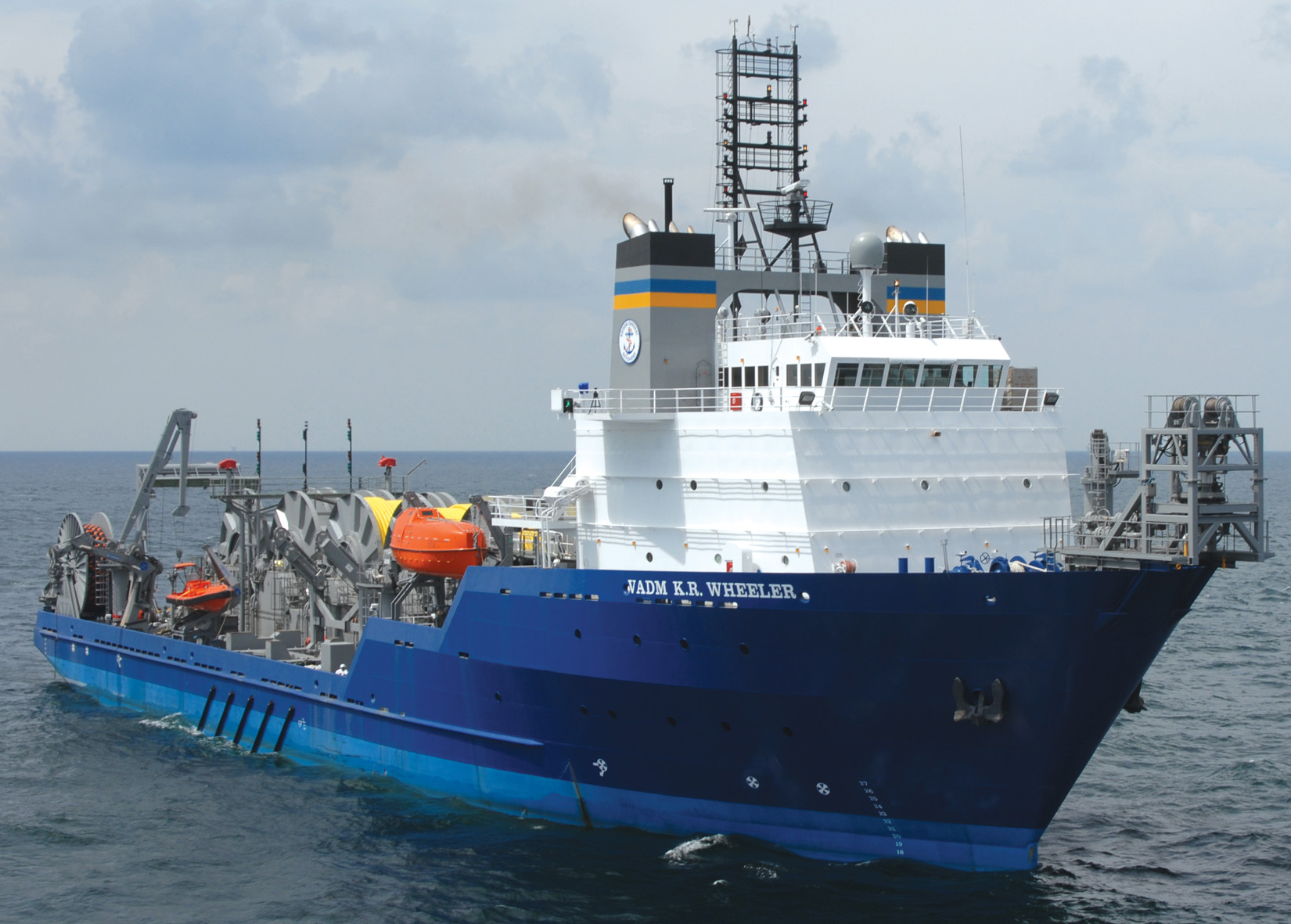
USNS Vice Adm. K. R. Wheeler (T-AG-5001)

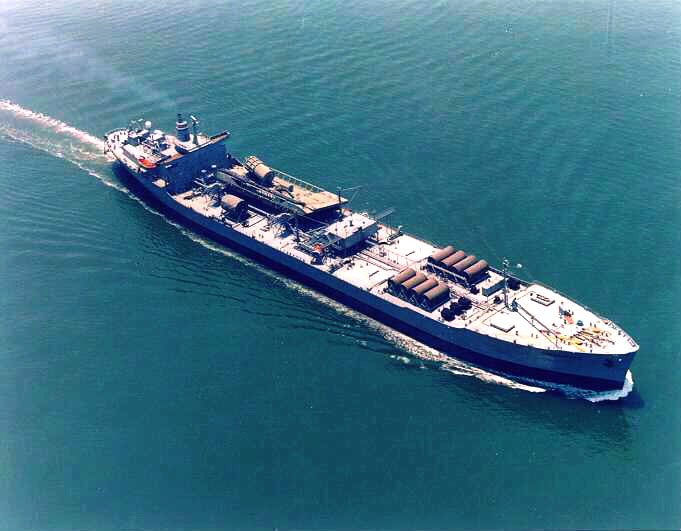
SS Chesapeake (AOT-5084), note the green barge-like Single Anchor Leg Mooring (SALM) on the deck aft of center for use in deploying the OPDS hoses, hose reels are forward

OPDS ships support amphibious operations by pumping needed fuel ashore without the need for port facilities. They do not have unique hull classification symbols.

=== Pump vessels ===
- USNS Vice Adm. K. R. Wheeler (T-AG-5001) [I]

=== Tankers ===
All OPDS tankers have been scrapped.

- Potomac (T-AO-181)
- List of United States Navy oilers § Other transport oilers

== See also ==
- Amphibious assault ship
- Amphibious warfare ship
- List of current ships of the United States Navy
- List of United States Navy ships
- List of United States Navy losses in World War II § Amphibious warfare ships - abbreviated list
- List of U.S. Navy ships sunk or damaged in action during World War II § Amphibious ships - detailed list
- Mobile offshore base
- Robert McNamara as Secretary of Defense § Sealift and amphibious warfare
