= USS Xenia =

Cargo ship of the United States Navy

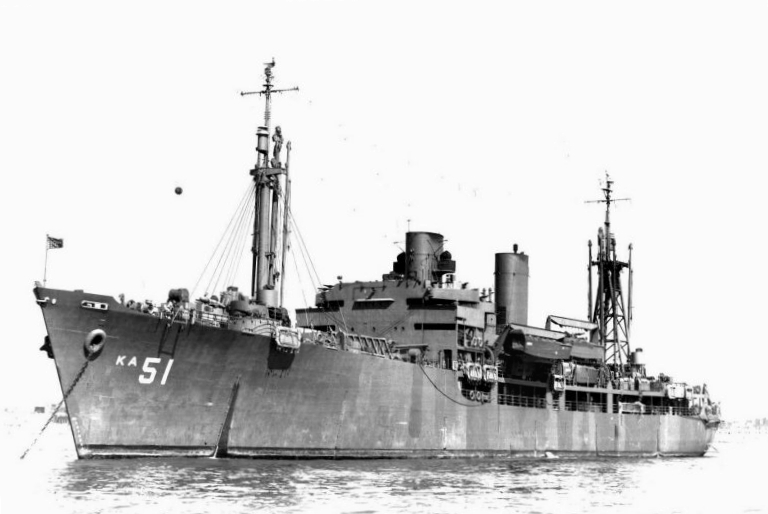

History

United States
- Name: USS Xenia
- Namesake: The asteroid Xenia
- Builder: Walsh-Kaiser Company, Providence, Rhode Island
- Laid down: 4 May 1945
- Launched: 27 June 1945
- Commissioned: 28 July 1945
- Decommissioned: 13 May 1946
- Stricken: 30 November 1946
- Fate: Sold to Chile, 1946

Chile
- Name: Presidente Errazuriz
- Acquired: 1946
- Decommissioned: 1962
- Fate: partly scrapped 1966

General characteristics
- Class & type: Artemis-class attack cargo ship
- Type: S4–SE2–BE1
- Displacement: 4,087 long tons (4,153 t) light; 7,080 long tons (7,194 t) full
- Length: 426 ft (130 m)
- Beam: 58 ft (18 m)
- Draft: 16 ft (4.9 m)
- Speed: 16.9 knots (31.3 km/h; 19.4 mph)
- Complement: 303 officers and enlisted
- Armament: 1 × 5"/38 caliber gun mount; 4 × twin 40 mm gun mounts; 10 × 20 mm gun mounts

USS Xenia (AKA-51) was an Artemis-class attack cargo ship in service with the United States Navy from 1945 to 1946. She was then sold to Chile, where she served as Presidente Errazuriz until 1966.

== History ==
=== U.S. Navy ===
USS Xenia (AKA-51) was laid down under Maritime Commission contract (MC hull 1912) on 4 May 1945 at Providence, Rhode Island, by the Walsh-Kaiser Company; launched on 27 June 1945; sponsored by Mrs. Roger W. Armstrong; and commissioned at the Boston Navy Yard on 28 July 1945.

Following shakedown, Xenia operated off the east coast with Service Force, Atlantic Fleet, from September 1945 until 17 April 1946, when she reported to the Commandant, 3rd Naval District, New York City, for disposal.

=== Chilean Navy ===
Decommissioned on 13 May 1946, Xenia was struck from the Navy list on 30 November 1946 and subsequently transferred to the government of Chile. Renamed Presidente Errazuriz (named after Federico Errázuriz Echaurren), she served the Chilean Navy, for a time serving as fleet flagship, until 1966. She was sold for partial scrapping by Agencias Metalugicas S.A.C of Chile. A section of the hull was retained by the Chilean Navy for use as a floating jetty.

== Name background ==
The Greek word xenia (ξενία) is a term for an ancient concept of hospitality.

A July 1945 newspaper report stated that the Walsh-Kaiser Company had named each of its attack cargo ships after stars. However, this was questioned at the time, and appears to be in error. The ship names do correspond to the names of minor planets (asteroids), such as USS Artemis (AKA-21), 105 Artemis; USS Athene (AKA-22), 881 Athene; USS Aurelia (AKA-23), 419 Aurelia; and so forth. Thus, AKA-51 appears to be named for 625 Xenia, which was discovered by August Kopff in 1907.

Shortly after the ship was commissioned, the town of Xenia, Ohio, demonstrated how well it deserved the name which it shares with the asteroid and warship by offering to adopt the attack cargo ship.
