= Walsh-Kaiser Company =

American shipyard during World War II

- Cranston and Providence, Rhode Island, U.S.
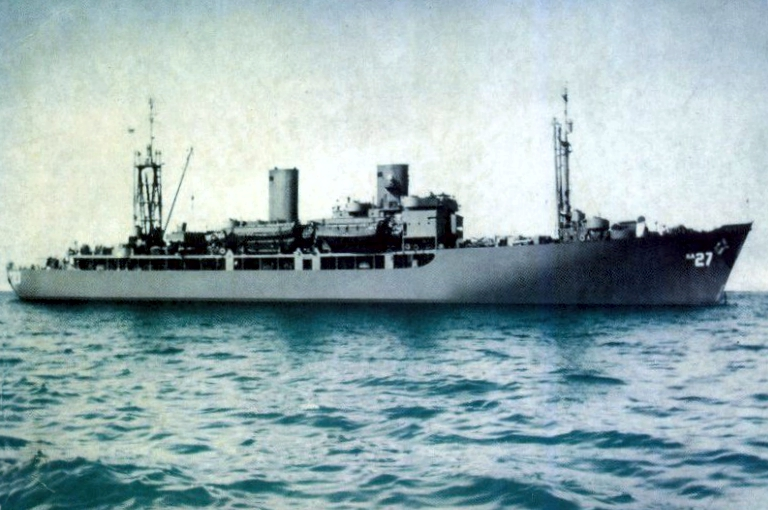
- USS Devosa (AKA-27), built at Walsh-Kaiser Company in 1944

Site information
- Type: Shipyard
- Owner: United States Maritime Commission
- Operator: Rheem Manufacturing (1942–1943); Kaiser Shipyards (1943–1945)
- Controlled by: United States Navy
- Ships built: 63

Location
- Location within Rhode Island Location within the United States
- Coordinates: 41°47′16″N 71°22′59″W

Site history
- Built: 1942
- In use: 1942–1945

Walsh-Kaiser Company was a shipyard along the Providence River on the border of Cranston and Providence, Rhode Island. It was built during World War II and financed by the Maritime Commission as part of the country's Emergency Shipbuilding Program. It was originally operated by Rheem Manufacturing, a company with no previous shipbuilding expertise. When Rheem had difficulty managing the yard, Kaiser Shipyards was retained to manage the operation.

== Operational history ==
In 1942, the Maritime Commission selected Fields Point for the location of an emergency shipyard. It was planned to be able to build ships on six different ways. The construction of the shipyard was financed as part of the country's Emergency Shipbuilding Program. Storekeepers and housewives, clerks and youths fresh out of school worked side by side, turning out ship after ship. Construction began on March 28, 1942. The shipyard construction swallowed the popular Kerwin's Beach, which drew thousands to the shores of the Providence River before it was covered over. Although 1 million square yards (840,000 m^{2}) of fill from a nearby hillside was dumped onto the mud flats, this still failed to stabilize the area. The total cost of the shipyard was $26 million.

On December 31, 1942, the first of many misfortunes hit the plant. The plate shop, the first step in the production process, burned to the ground. In February 1943, after the Rheem company showed difficulty managing the yard, Kaiser Shipyards was asked to manage the operation of the yard. As a result of the takeover, the size of the yard increased from 9,000 employees to over 14,000 just four months later. Eventually, 7 miles (11 km) of road wound about the yard.

The first ships that the yard produced were Liberty ships. After 10 ships were completed, 21 frigates were built. After those ships were finished, 32 attack cargo ships (Navy hull designation AKA) were constructed and launched. In the three years that the yard was in operation, 63 ships were eventually launched and completed.

After learning from their initial mistakes, workers became more skilled with the building of ships. It took only 136 days from the keel laying to delivery of the attack cargo ships. The fastest turnover took a mere 82 days. On September 1, 1945, Secretary of the Navy James Forrestal wrote to T. J. Walsh, the head of the company, praising the work of the local yard and saying that it was preeminent in building the great arsenal that helped save the world. (Note: While one source mentions that President Harry S. Truman visit the site, escorted by J. Howard McGrath, then Governor of Rhode Island, contemporary reporting of such a visit is lacking.)

Work was described as decent by the workers who labored there. Wages were also high due to the influence that the American Federation of Labor (AFL) had in the area. Common laborers at the yard earned 85 cents an hour.

The steady employment actually helped the local economy as the yard employed 18,767 on September 30, 1944. Three months later the payroll included 20,879. During the yard's peak in January 1945, 21,264 people were employed. Among these numbers were over 3,000 women. At the end of the war, the shipyard closed after laying off over 3,000 people in three months. In October 1945, it was reported that the Maritime Commission agreed to sell the property to the City of Providence for approximately $308,000.

== Post-war use ==
A drive-in theater with a 1,700 car capacity operated on the site of the yard from 1957 to 1976. In the late 1970s, there were plans to construct a cargo container port at the site, but efforts fell through and two cranes are all that remained.

The area has subsequently been reused by a few companies. Circa 1999, Johnson & Wales University had taken over a portion of the yard for their culinary arts program.

== Ships built ==
=== Liberty Ships ===
- SS James De Wolf
- SS John Clarke
- SS Lyman Abbott
- SS Moses Brown
- SS Samuel Gorton
- SS William Coddington
- SS Melville Jacoby
- SS Frank Gilbreth
- SS Cornelius Ford
- SS Jesse H Metcalf
- SS Nelson Aldrich

=== Colony-class frigates ===
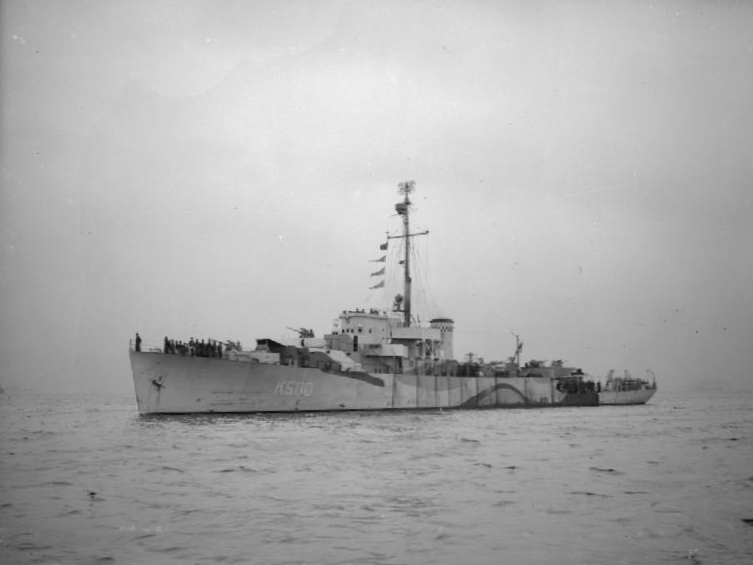
HMS Anguilla

Most of the Colony-class frigate names corresponded to an island or archipelago—such as Anguilla, Antigua, Ascension, and so forth—that was (in the era built) a Crown colony or British protectorate. Exceptions were Nyasaland and Somaliland, British protectorates in Africa.

- HMS Anguilla (K500)
- HMS Antigua (K501)
- HMS Ascension (K502)
- HMS Bahamas (K503)
- HMS Barbados (K504)
- HMS Caicos (K505)
- HMS Cayman (K506)
- HMS Dominica (K507)
- HMS Labuan (K584)
- HMS Tobago (K585)
- HMS Montserrat (K586)
- HMS Nyasaland (K587)
- HMS Papua (K588)
- HMS Pitcairn (K589)
- HMS St. Helena (K590)
- HMS Sarawak (K591)
- HMS Seychelles (K592)
- HMS Perim (K593)
- HMS Somaliland (K594)
- HMS Tortola (K595)
- HMS Zanzibar (K596)

=== Artemis-class attack cargo ships ===
A July 1945 newspaper report stated that the Walsh-Kaiser Company had named each of its Artemis-class attack cargo ship after stars. However, this was questioned at the time, and appears to be in error. Most of the ship names correspond to the names of minor planets (asteroids): 105 Artemis, 881 Athene, 419 Aurelia, and so forth through 840 Zenobia. There are three exceptions, in which ships were named for constellations: Corvus, Hydrus, and Lacerta.

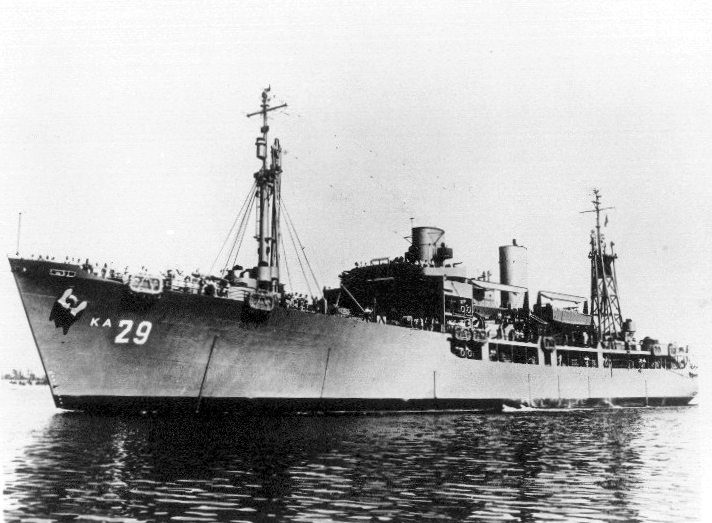
USS Lacerta

- USS Artemis (AKA-21)
- USS Athene (AKA-22)
- USS Aurelia (AKA-23)
- USS Birgit (AKA-24)
- USS Circe (AKA-25)
- USS Corvus (AKA-26)
- USS Devosa (AKA-27)
- USS Hydrus (AKA-28)
- USS Lacerta (AKA-29)
- USS Lumen (AKA-30)
- USS Medea (AKA-31)
- USS Mellena (AKA-32)
- USS Ostara (AKA-33)
- USS Pamina (AKA-34)
- USS Polana (AKA-35)
- USS Renate (AKA-36)
- USS Roxane (AKA-37)
- USS Sappho (AKA-38)
- USS Sarita (AKA-39)
- USS Scania (AKA-40)
- USS Selinur (AKA-41)
- USS Sidonia (AKA-42)
- USS Sirona (AKA-43)
- USS Sylvania (AKA-44)
- USS Tabora (AKA-45)
- USS Troilus (AKA-46)
- USS Turandot (AKA-47)
- USS Valeria (AKA-48)
- USS Vanadis (AKA-49)
- USS Veritas (AKA-50)
- USS Xenia (AKA-51)
- USS Zenobia (AKA-52)
