= USS Valeria =

Cargo ship of the United States Navy

History

United States
- Name: USS Valeria
- Namesake: The asteroid Valeria
- Builder: Walsh-Kaiser Company, Providence, Rhode Island
- Laid down: 8 April 1945
- Launched: 29 May 1945
- Commissioned: 28 June 1945
- Decommissioned: 18 March 1946
- Stricken: 17 April 1946
- Fate: Scrapped 1968

General characteristics
- Class & type: Artemis-class attack cargo ship
- Type: S4–SE2–BE1
- Displacement: 4,087 long tons (4,153 t) light; 7,080 long tons (7,194 t) full
- Length: 426 ft (130 m)
- Beam: 58 ft (18 m)
- Draft: 16 ft (4.9 m)
- Speed: 16.9 knots (31.3 km/h; 19.4 mph)
- Complement: 303 officers and enlisted
- Armament: 1 × 5"/38 caliber gun mount; 4 × twin 40 mm gun mounts; 10 × 20 mm gun mounts

USS Valeria (AKA-48) was an Artemis-class attack cargo ship named after the minor planet 611 Valeria, discovered in 1906 by Joel Hastings Metcalf, an amateur astronomer who made the initial identification of 41 minor planets. The meaning of the name is unknown. Valeria served as a commissioned ship for 8 months.

Valeria (AKA-48) was laid down under a Maritime Commission contract (MC hull 1909) on 8 April 1945 at Providence, R.I., by the Walsh-Kaiser Co., Inc.; launched on 29 May 1945; sponsored by Mrs. A. D. Hunter; and transferred to the Navy on 28 June 1945 and commissioned the same day.

== Service history ==
The new attack cargo ship departed Boston on 9 July; conducted shakedown training in the Chesapeake Bay; and got underway on 29 July, bound for the Canal Zone. She transited the Panama Canal on 5 August and steamed westward, conducting gunnery exercises en route. During her passage to Oahu, hostilities ended in the Pacific. On the 18th, Valeria moored at Pearl Harbor.

On 7 September, she got underway for Noumea. Ten days later, the ship reached Espiritu Santo where she took on troops from Achernar and Turandot. On the 19th, Valeria proceeded to Nouméa where she disembarked her passengers. Underway again the next day, she returned to Espiritu Santo on the 22d. There, on the 25th, the attack cargo ship loaded elements of the 85th Construction Battalion and departed the New Hebrides the following day. She steamed via Eniwetok and delivered her cargo and passengers at Wake Island early in October.

She completed discharging her cargo there on the 12th and reported for "Magic Carpet" duties — transporting returning servicemen from the Pacific islands to the United States mainland. Before the end of the year, she made two round trips carrying returning Army veterans from Eniwetok and Saipan to West Coast ports.

Assigned to the 5th Naval District on 5 January 1946, Valeria departed Los Angeles, California, on the 11th, steamed via the Panama Canal to the Atlantic coast, and arrived at Norfolk on 1 February. She was decommissioned on 18 March, and her name was struck from the Navy list on 17 April. Valeria was delivered to the War Shipping Administration at Lee Hall, Va., on 26 June 1946.
