= Sidon (disambiguation) =

Sidon is an ancient Phoenician city and a major modern city in Lebanon.

Sidon may also refer to:

== Places ==
- Sidon, Mississippi, U.S.
- Sidon District, an administrative district in Lebanon containing the city of Sidon
- Sidon Eyalet, an administrative division of the Ottoman Empire
- Lordship of Sidon, a fiefdom of the Kingdom of Jerusalem
- Roman Catholic Diocese of Sidon, in the Kingdom of Jerusalem in the 12th/13th centuries
- River Sidon, mentioned in the Book of Mormon

== Other uses ==
- Sidon (surname), including a list of people with the name, and known as "of Sidon"
- HMS Sidon, two Royal Navy ships
- Sidon sequence, a sequence in number theory with specific properties
- Prince Sidon, a character from The Legend of Zelda: Breath of the Wild

== See also ==
- Sidonia (disambiguation)
