= USS Ostara =

Cargo ship of the United States Navy

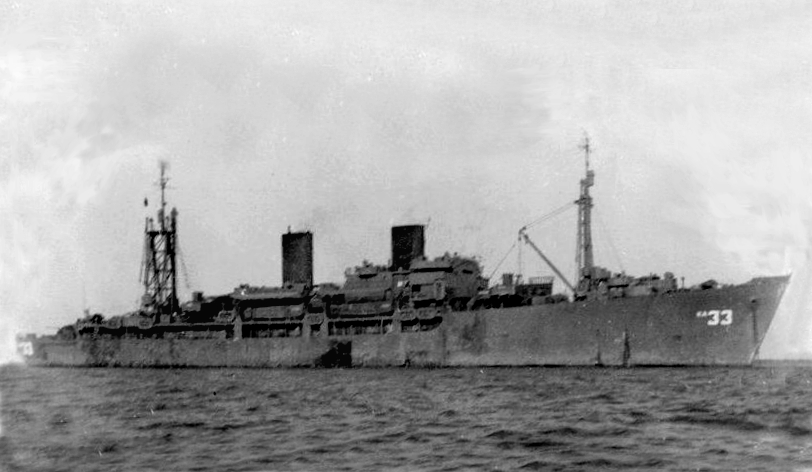
- USS Ostara (AKA-33)

History

United States
- Name: USS Ostara
- Namesake: The asteroid Ostara
- Builder: Walsh-Kaiser Company, Providence, Rhode Island
- Laid down: 13 October 1944
- Launched: 21 December 1944
- Commissioned: 31 January 1945
- Decommissioned: 1 March 1946
- Stricken: 26 June 1946
- Fate: Transferred to the War Shipping Administration, 26 June 1946. Scrapped in 1965.

General characteristics
- Class & type: Artemis-class attack cargo ship
- Type: S4–SE2–BE1
- Displacement: 4,087 long tons (4,153 t) light; 7,080 long tons (7,194 t) full
- Length: 426 ft (130 m)
- Beam: 58 ft (18 m)
- Draft: 16 ft (4.9 m)
- Speed: 17 knots (31 km/h; 20 mph)
- Complement: 303 officers and enlisted
- Armament: 1 × 5"/38 caliber gun mount; 4 × twin 40 mm gun mounts; 10 × 20 mm gun mounts

USS Ostara (AKA-33) was an Artemis-class attack cargo ship named after the asteroid 343 Ostara, which in turn was named after the Teutonic goddess of spring, described by Jacob Grimm in his Deutsche Mythologie as equivalent to the Anglo-Saxon Eostre. USS Ostara served as a commissioned ship for 13 months.

Ostara (AKA-33) was laid down 13 October 1944 by Walsh-Kaiser Co., Inc., Providence, R.I. under a Maritime Commission Contract; launched 21 December 1944; sponsored by Ensign Rene Vandersloot, Navy Nurse; commissioned 31 January 1945.

== Service history ==
On 3 February Ostara was underway for the Boston Navy Yard with a pre-commissioning crew from her sister ship Polana aboard for training. After a shakedown cruise in the Chesapeake Bay she left the Norfolk area and proceeded, via the Panama Canal, to Pearl Harbor, where she arrived 23 March. After discharging cargo she left Pearl Harbor for San Francisco, steaming independently.

On 15 April the ship left San Francisco and returned to Hawaii. Unloading and loading completed, she left Pearl Harbor 27 May for Eniwetok, Marshall Islands, arriving 4 June. The next day Ostara was underway for Saipan, Marianas Islands. Upon arrival 9 June, troops were discharged and unloading of cargo commenced. The ship then returned to the United States reaching San Diego 3 July.

Loading cargo once more, Ostara left San Diego for Pearl Harbor 17 July. On 28 July she was once more underway for Eniwetok, where she arrived 6 August, fueled, and was underway for Guam 7 August. Upon arrival at Guam passengers and cargo were discharged and the ship proceeded to Saipan, where she underwent emergency hull repairs.

Ostara next touched at the Philippine Islands, arriving at San Pedro Bay, Leyte, 24 August, and at Manila, Luzon, 31 August where cargo was taken on, as well as a portion of the 43rd Army Division for transportation to Japan. On 13 September Ostara moored at Yokohama Docks. While at Yokohama she safely rode out a typhoon which caused great damage in other areas.

Returning to Guam 23 September Ostara moved to Saipan and then departed, with units of the 6th Marine Division aboard, for Qingdao, China. On 11 October the ship arrived at Qingdao, where details of Chinese coolies commenced unloading operations.

Ostara arrived Manila Bay 23 October. On 1 November she left Manila for Haiphong, French Indochina, and after arriving embarked 928 enlisted men and 54 officers of the 52nd Chinese army for transportation to Qinhuangdao, China. Three Chinese enlisted men died aboard of disease during the trip, despite all sanitary precautions.

On 27 November Ostara anchored in Buckner Bay, Okinawa. Two days later she departed for San Diego, (Editor's note: the DANFS entry seems to be missing something here) the Panama Canal, and arrived Norfolk, Va., 23 January 1946. Here preparations for the decommissioning of the ship were begun. Decommissioning was completed 1 March 1946. Ostara was stricken from the list of naval vessels 17 April 1946. On 26 June 1946 Ostara was transferred to the War Shipping Administration for disposal at Norfolk. Assigned to the National Defense Reserve Fleet, Ostara was scrapped in 1965.
