= Sidonia (disambiguation) =

Sidonia or Sidonie is a feminine given name. It may also refer to:

- 579 Sidonia, an asteroid
- USS Sidonia (AKA-42), a US Navy attack cargo ship
- Order of Sidonia, a chivalric order for women instituted by the Kingdom of Saxony
- Sidonie (Brumov-Bylnice), a district of Brumov-Bylnice, Czech Republic
- Sidonia, Tennessee, Weakley County, Tennessee
- Fromont and Risler, also titled Sidonie, an 1874 French novel
- Sidonia, a starship in Knights of Sidonia, a Japanese manga series by Tsutomu Nihei
- "Sidonie" (song), sung by Brigitte Bardot in the film A Private Affair

== See also ==
- Cydonia (Mars), a region on the planet Mars
- Duke of Medina Sidonia, a noble Spanish title
- Medina-Sidonia, a city and municipality in Spain
- Kydonia or Cydonia, an ancient city state on Crete
