= USS Tabora =

Cargo ship of the United States Navy

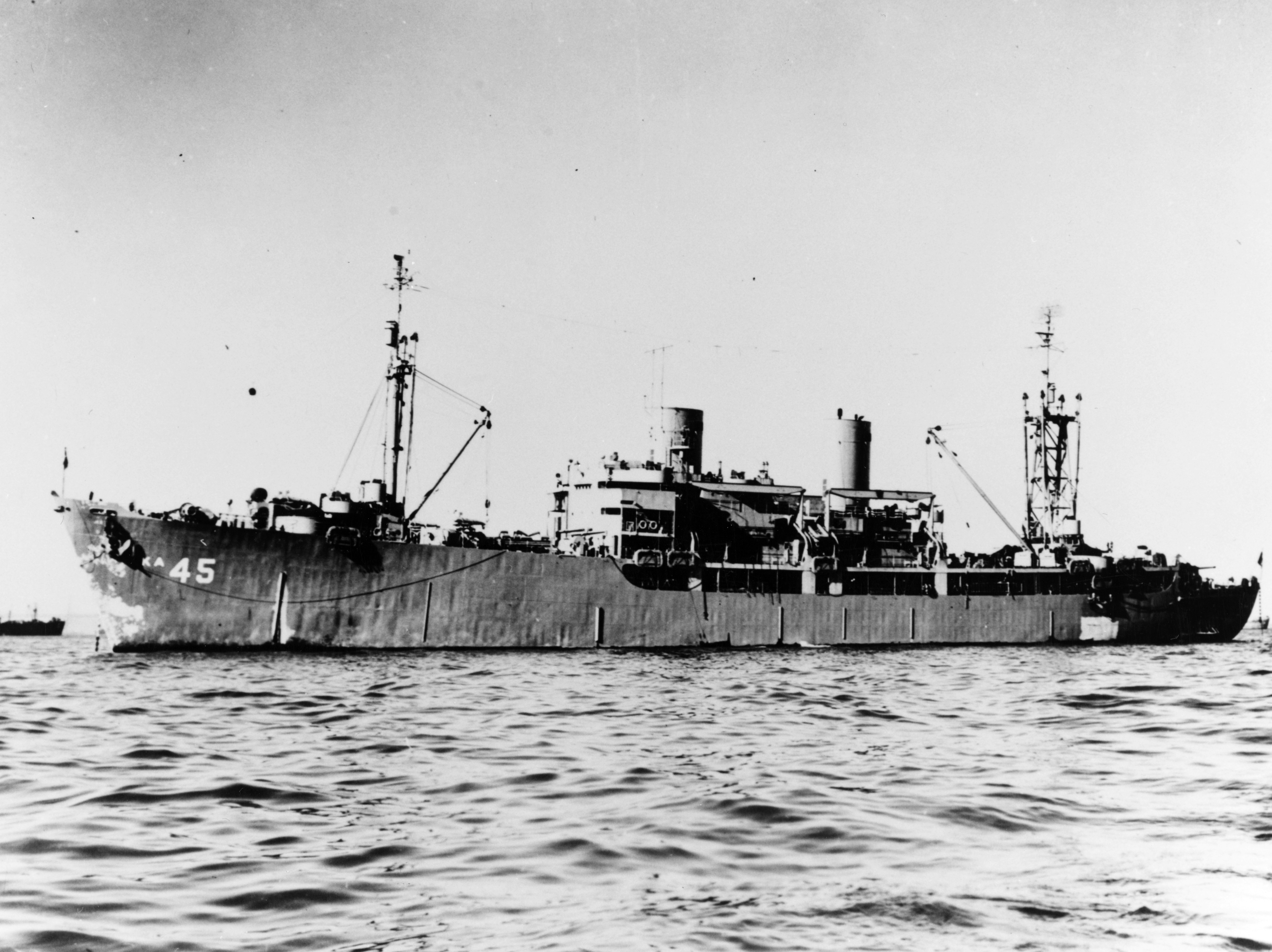

History

United States
- Name: USS Tabora
- Namesake: The asteroid Tabora
- Builder: Walsh-Kaiser Company, Providence, Rhode Island
- Laid down: 4 March 1945
- Launched: 3 May 1945
- Commissioned: 29 May 1945
- Decommissioned: 29 May 1946
- Stricken: 3 July 1946
- Fate: Scrapped March 1965

General characteristics
- Class & type: Artemis-class attack cargo ship
- Type: S4–SE2–BE1
- Displacement: 4,087 long tons (4,153 t) light; 7,080 long tons (7,194 t) full
- Length: 426 ft (130 m)
- Beam: 58 ft (18 m)
- Draft: 16 ft (4.9 m)
- Speed: 17 knots (31 km/h; 20 mph)
- Complement: 303 officers and enlisted
- Armament: 1 × 5"/38 caliber gun mount; 4 × twin 40 mm gun mounts; 10 × 20 mm gun mounts

USS Tabora (AKA-45) was an Artemis-class attack cargo ship in service with the United States Navy from 1945 to 1946. She was scrapped in 1965.

== History ==
Tabora (AKA-45) was named after the minor planet 721 Tabora. The minor planet was itself named after a ship, as after its discovery in 1911 it was named in 1913 at a conference in Hamburg, Germany held aboard the ocean liner Tabora of the Deutsche Ost-Afrika Linie. USS Tabora was laid down under Maritime Commission contract (MC hull 1906) on 4 March 1945 at Providence, R.I., by the Walsh-Kaiser Co., Inc.; launched on 3 May 1945; sponsored by Mrs. Arthur W. Devine; and commissioned on 29 May 1945.

Tabora departed Boston on 9 June and — after nine days of shakedown training out of Hampton Roads, Va. — headed for France. She arrived at Marseille on 7 July and, the following week, got underway for Panama. She reached Cristóbal on the 28th. Two days later, Tabora transited the canal and steamed toward the Marshall Islands. She arrived at Eniwetok on 22 August and, the next day, pushed on toward the Philippines. Upon arriving at San Fernando, Leyte, on the last day of August, the ship was assigned to the 5th Fleet.

Tabora loaded troops and vehicles of the 33rd Infantry Division and sailed on 20 September for Japan. She arrived at Wakayama, Honshu, on the 25th; unloaded; and, the next day, began the return trip to the Philippines. She transported another load of occupation troops to Matsuyama, Shikoku, in mid-October. On the 24th, Tabora was assigned to "Magic Carpet" duty, returning veterans to the United States. On the last day of October, she got underway for Buckner Bay; loaded 340 marines; and sailed for San Francisco.

Tabora continued shuttling troops from Pacific bases to the United States until early 1946 when she was scheduled for inactivation. Tabora was decommissioned on 29 May, returned to the Maritime Commission on 30 June, and struck from the Navy list on 3 July 1946. She was scrapped in 1965.
