= USS Corvus =

Cargo ship of the United States Navy

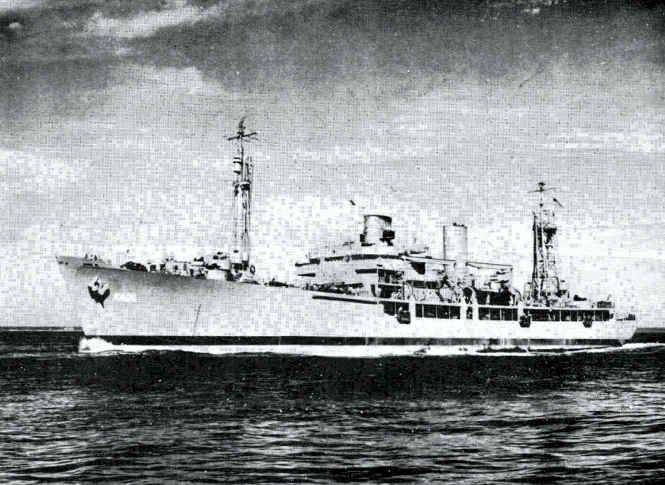

History

United States
- Name: USS Corvus
- Namesake: The constellation Corvus
- Builder: Walsh-Kaiser Company, Providence, Rhode Island
- Launched: 24 September 1944
- Commissioned: 20 November 1944
- Decommissioned: 29 March 1946
- Honours and awards: 1 battle star (WWII)
- Fate: Transferred to the Maritime Commission for disposal, 31 October 1946

General characteristics
- Class & type: Artemis-class attack cargo ship
- Type: S4–SE2–BE1
- Displacement: 4,087 long tons (4,153 t) light; 7,080 long tons (7,194 t) full
- Length: 426 ft (130 m)
- Beam: 58 ft (18 m)
- Draft: 16 ft (4.9 m)
- Speed: 17 knots (31 km/h; 20 mph)
- Complement: 303 officers and enlisted
- Armament: 1 × 5"/38 caliber gun mount; 4 × twin 40 mm gun mounts; 10 × 20 mm gun mounts

USS Corvus (AKA-26) was an Artemis-class attack cargo ship in service with the United States navy from 1944 to 1946. She was scrapped in 1964.

== History ==
Corvus (AKA-26) was named after the southern constellation Corvus. She was launched 24 September 1944 by Walsh-Kaiser Co., Inc., Providence, R.I., under a Maritime Commission contract; sponsored by Mrs. O. Parks; acquired by the Navy 20 November 1944; and commissioned the same day.

Corvus departed Providence 2 December 1944 for San Francisco, where she loaded cargo for Leyte. Arriving in the Philippines 21 February 1945, Corvus discharged cargo at Guiuan for the establishment of an air base there, and transferred cargo at Dulag. On 13 March she began rehearsals for the Okinawa operation, and sailed from Leyte Gulf 27 March for the landings 1 April. She remained off Okinawa undergoing the first of the kamikaze attacks, until 10 April when she sailed with Army casualties for Guam, arriving 14 April. Corvus then sailed for Pearl Harbor where, according to a crew member oral history, new engines were installed. Corvus then returned to the West Coast for overhaul, and loaded Army men and supplies at Seattle sailing 15 June for Tinian, where she arrived 3 July. Cargo was said to have been parts to load F31, Fat Man assembly parts to load Fat Man onto aircraft named Bockscar to drop bomb on Nagasaki, Japan. Project Alberta was name of the operation and Bockscar the aircraft that dropped the assembled bomb. It was said there were over 80 plain clothed project managers (Army civilians) on board the Corvus. Low clearance sailors asked what those personnel were doing on board and what was in the un-marked boxes they were carrying. It was very uncharacteristic to carry so many personnel, let alone civilians, on an attack cargo ship. The ship's captain said he could not tell anyone anything beyond the fact that because of the cargo they were carrying, World War II would be over two weeks after they were to have arrived on Tinian Island. Most of the lower clearance sailors were excessively promoted to keep their curiosity at bay.

Corvus sailed from Tinian 7 July 1945 carrying cargo for Guadalcanal, the Russell Islands, Samar, and Manus, and reported to Manila 30 August. She loaded cargo and occupation troops, and sailed 18 September for Honshū. Returning to Manila 14 October, she sailed a week later to embark homeward-bound servicemen at Yokohama returning to San Pedro, Calif., with them 26 November. Between 26 December and 10 February, she made a similar voyage from the west coast to Guam, then sailed 16 February for Mobile, Alabama, and Orange, Texas.

=== Decommissioning and fate ===
Corvus was decommissioned 29 March 1946, and transferred to the Maritime Commission 31 October 1946 for disposal. She was scrapped in 1964.

== Awards ==
Corvus received one battle star in World War II.
