= USS Circe (AKA-25) =

Cargo ship of the United States Navy

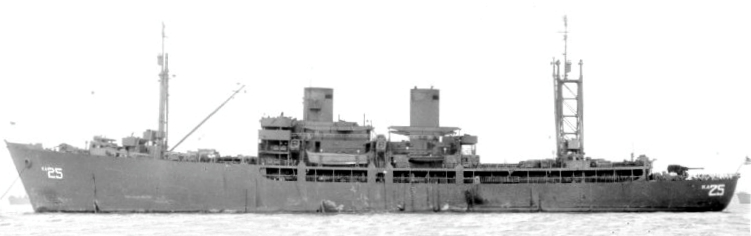
- USS Circe (AKA-25)

History

United States
- Name: USS Circe
- Namesake: The asteroid Circe
- Builder: Walsh-Kaiser Company, Providence, Rhode Island
- Launched: 4 August 1944
- Commissioned: 10 November 1944
- Decommissioned: 20 May 1946
- Honours and awards: 1 battle star (WWII)
- Fate: Transferred to the War Shipping Administration for disposal, 26 June 1946

General characteristics
- Class & type: Artemis-class attack cargo ship
- Type: S4–SE2–BE1
- Displacement: 4,087 long tons (4,153 t) light; 7,000 long tons (7,112 t) full
- Length: 426 ft (130 m)
- Beam: 58 ft (18 m)
- Draft: 16 ft (4.9 m)
- Speed: 16.9 knots (31.3 km/h; 19.4 mph)
- Complement: 302 officers and enlisted
- Armament: 1 × 5"/38 caliber gun mount; 4 × twin 40 mm gun mounts; 10 × 20 mm gun mounts

USS Circe (AKA-25) was an Artemis-class attack cargo ship named after the asteroid 34 Circe, which in turn was named after Circe, a goddess or sorceress in Greek mythology. USS Circe served as a commissioned ship for 18 months.

Circe (AKA-25) was launched 4 August 1944 by Walsh-Kaiser Co., Inc., Providence, R.I., under a Maritime Commission contract; sponsored by Mrs. R. E. Dougherty; acquired by the Navy 10 November 1944; and commissioned the same day.

== Service history ==
=== 1945 ===
Circe reached Pearl Harbor from the East Coast 3 January 1945. Twenty days later she put to sea with Marine reinforcements and explosives for Guadalcanal, and through February, ferried troops in the Guadalcanal area. After practice landings in Savo Sound, she reported at Ulithi 21 March to stage for the assault of Okinawa.

Between 1 April 1945 and 6 April, Circe was part of the vast armada off Okinawa, closing the coast in daylight to offload men and equipment, and retiring seaward at night. She called at Saipan and Pearl Harbor on her passage to San Francisco, where from 19 May to 27 May she loaded cargo for a voyage to Pearl Harbor. Sailing again from San Francisco 24 June, she carried pilots and ground crews to Eniwetok, Kwajalein, Saipan, and Tinian, returning with men thus relieved to Pearl Harbor 13 August.

Clearing Pearl Harbor 25 September 1945, Circe supported the occupation on cargo duty which took her to ports in Japan and Korea, returning with homeward bound servicemen to San Francisco 20 December 1945.

=== Decommissioning ===
There she was decommissioned 20 May 1946, and transferred to the War Shipping Administration for disposal 26 June 1946.

Circe received one battle star for World War II service.
