= USS Athene =

Cargo ship of the United States Navy

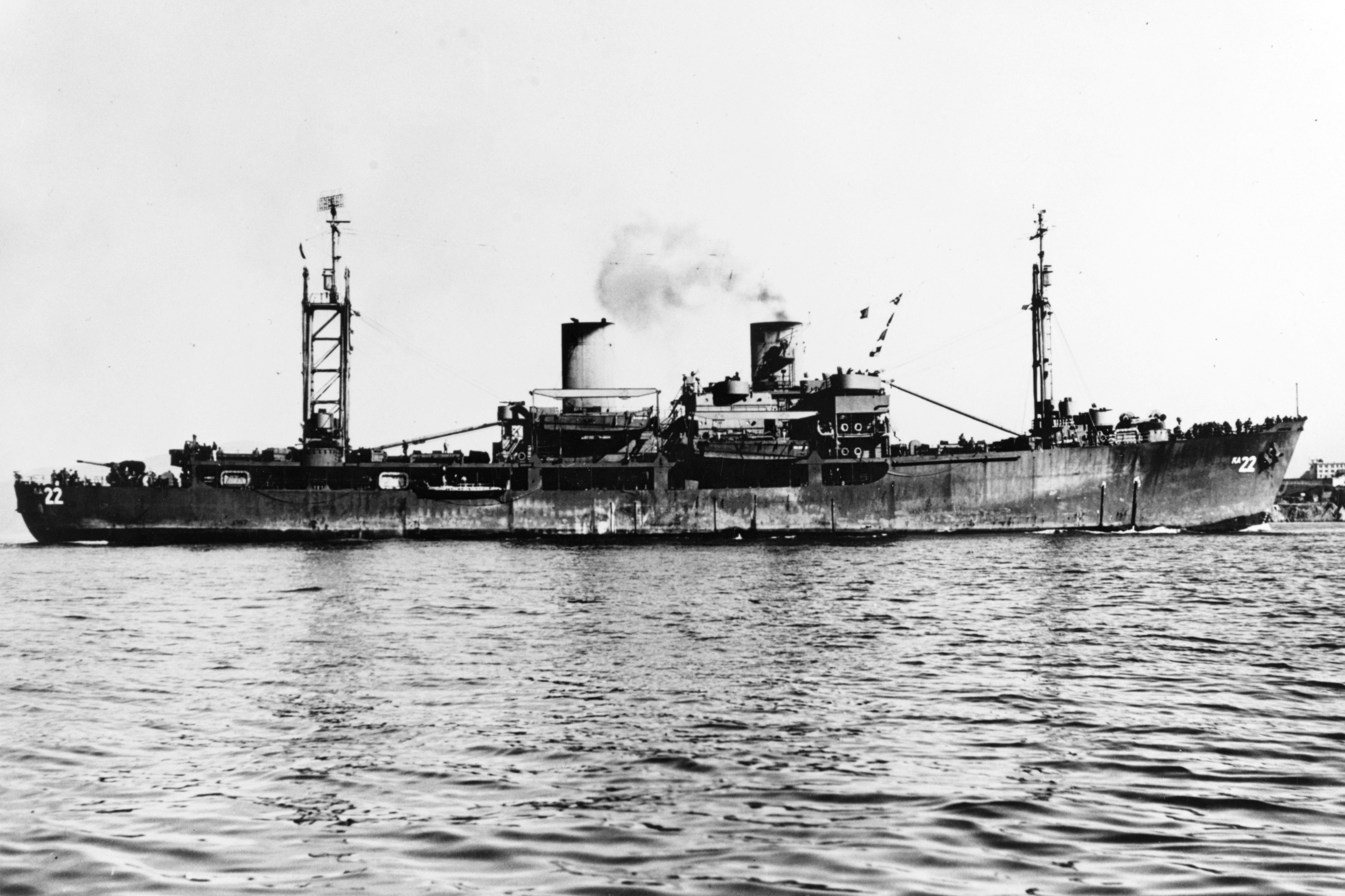
- USS Athene (AKA-22) underway in San Francisco Bay, California (USA), in 1945-1946 (NH 78148).jpg

History

United States
- Name: Athene
- Namesake: The asteroid Athene
- Builder: Walsh-Kaiser Company, Providence, Rhode Island
- Laid down: 20 January 1944
- Launched: 18 June 1944
- Commissioned: 29 September 1944
- Decommissioned: 17 June 1946
- Stricken: 1 August 1947
- Honours and awards: 2 battle stars (WWII)
- Fate: Scrapped in 1966

General characteristics
- Class & type: Artemis-class attack cargo ship
- Type: S4–SE2–BE1
- Displacement: 4,087 long tons (4,153 t) light; 7,080 long tons (7,194 t) full
- Length: 426 ft (130 m)
- Beam: 58 ft (18 m)
- Draft: 16 ft (4.9 m)
- Speed: 16.9 knots (31.3 km/h; 19.4 mph)
- Complement: 303 officers and enlisted
- Armament: 1 × 5-inch/38-caliber gun mount; 4 × twin 40 mm gun mounts; 10 × 20 mm gun mounts

USS Athene (AKA-22) was an Artemis-class attack cargo ship in service with the United States Navy from 1944 to 1946.

== History ==
Athene (AKA-22) was She was scrapped in 1966. named after the minor planet 881 Athene, which in turn was named after the Greek goddess Athena. She was laid down on 20 January 1944 under a Maritime Commission contract (MC hull 1883) at Providence, R.I., by the Walsh-Kaiser Co., Inc.; launched on 18 June 1944; sponsored by Mrs. Emily Thornton; and acquired by the Navy and commissioned on 29 September 1944.

=== 1944 ===
On 10 October, the attack transport got underway for shakedown training in the Chesapeake Bay. She left the east coast on 7 November, bound, via the Panama Canal, for Pearl Harbor. Athene reached Hawaii on 26 November and began a series of training exercises. The transport sailed for Eniwetok on 27 January 1945 and continued on to Saipan, arriving there on 11 February. Athene conducted two days of training exercises for troops scheduled to invade Iwo Jima. She sailed on 16 February, with officers and men of the 5th Marine Division embarked, and dropped anchor off Iwo Jima on the 19th. Athene began discharging her passengers on 27 February and got underway for Saipan the next day.

Athene returned to Pearl Harbor on 28 June to take on more supplies. She put back to sea on 12 July, bound for the Philippines with intermediate stops at Eniwetok and Ulithi. The attack transport anchored off Leyte on 30 July. For the duration of the war, she shuttled troops and cargo between islands in the Philippine archipelago.

=== 1945 ===
After Japan surrendered, she got underway on 7 September for Yokosuka. Athene was moored in Tokyo Bay on 18 September when, due to a typhoon, the ship collided with LST-844, dragged anchor into this ship causing slight damage to the bow and cutting the LST-844 bow anchor chain at the 82 fathom mark, thus causing the LST-844 to remain underway until the typhoon abated. This necessitated a repair period at Yokosuka, which lasted through 1 October. One month later, Athene began a voyage back to the United States. She paused at Saipan to embark homeward-bound troops and finally reached San Francisco on 23 November. Athene returned to Saipan late in December to bring back more troops. While underway to the west coast, she developed boiler trouble and was diverted to Pearl Harbor on 14 January 1946 for repairs.

=== 1946 ===
The attack cargo ship resumed her voyage on 18 January and moored at San Pedro, Los Angeles, on 25 January. She then proceeded to San Francisco. Later that month, Athene was assigned to Joint Task Force 1, which was the atomic bomb test unit at Bikini Atoll. Following her return from Bikini, Athene was decommissioned at Pearl Harbor on 17 June 1946.

=== Decommissioning and fate ===
Her name was struck from the Navy list on 1 August 1947, and the ship was transferred to the Maritime Commission on 23 September 1947. She was sold in 1966 to the Union Minerals and Alloy Corp., of New York City, and scrapped.

Athene earned two battle stars for her World War II service.
