= USS Roxane =

Cargo ship of the United States Navy

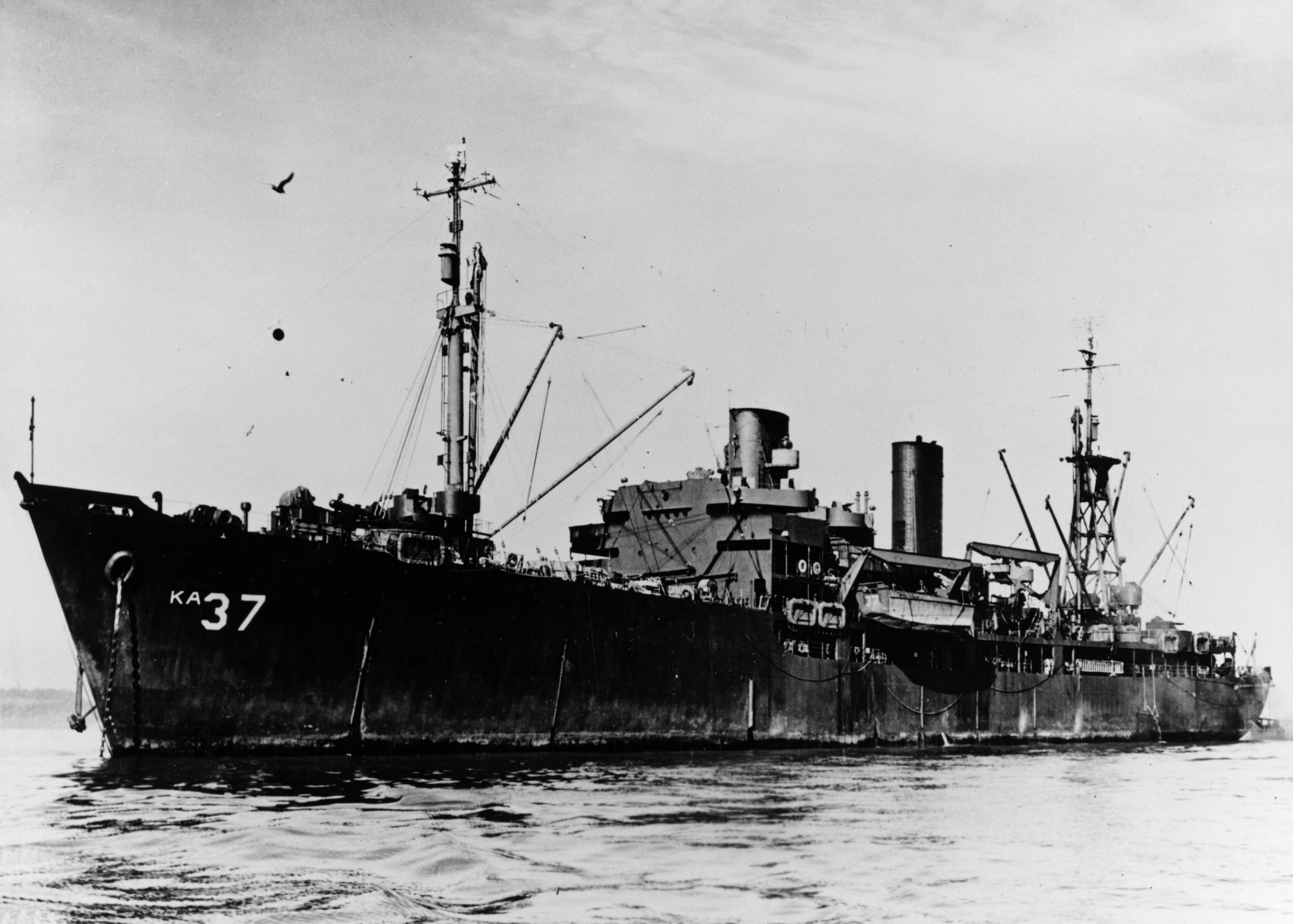

History

United States
- Name: USS Roxane
- Namesake: The asteroid Roxane
- Builder: Walsh-Kaiser Company, Providence, Rhode Island
- Laid down: 1 December 1944
- Launched: 14 February 1945
- Commissioned: 12 March 1945
- Decommissioned: 5 June 1946
- Stricken: 3 July 1946
- Fate: Transferred to the Maritime Commission, 29 June 1946, scrapped 1966

General characteristics
- Class & type: Artemis-class attack cargo ship
- Type: S4–SE2–BE1
- Displacement: 4,087 long tons (4,153 t) light; 7,080 long tons (7,194 t) full
- Length: 426 ft (130 m)
- Beam: 58 ft (18 m)
- Draft: 16 ft (4.9 m)
- Speed: 16 knots (30 km/h; 18 mph)
- Complement: 303 officers and enlisted
- Armament: 1 × 5"/38 caliber gun mount; 4 × twin 40 mm gun mounts; 10 × 20 mm gun mounts

USS Roxane (AKA-37) was an Artemis-class attack cargo ship in service with the United States Navy from 1945 to 1946. She was scrapped in 1966.

== History ==
Roxane (AKA-37) was named after the minor planet 317 Roxane, which in turn was named after Roxana, the wife of Alexander the Great. The ship was laid down 1 December 1944 by Walsh-Kaiser Co., Inc., Providence, R.I.; launched 14 February 1945; sponsored by Mrs. Edwin H. Armstrong; acquired by the Navy from the Maritime Commission (MC Hull 1898) and commissioned at Boston 12 March 1945.

Following shakedown off Boston, Roxane loaded at Norfolk and transited the Panama Canal 24 April 1945. Arriving Pearl Harbor 11 May, she proceeded on to Eniwetok and Saipan before putting into San Francisco 12 July. Departing San Francisco 25 July, she proceeded by way of Pearl Harbor, Eniwetok, and Ulithi, to Manila where she arrived 3 September. She operated on cargo runs between various Philippine ports until arriving Japan 23 October 1945.

On 1 November 1945, Roxane reported to ComServPac for "Magic Carpet" duty at Mitsugahama, and proceeded via Okinawa and arrived San Francisco with returning veterans 22 November. Departing again 11 December, she picked up additional troops at Yokosuka and Sasebo and reached Seattle 7 February.

Roxane reported for disposal to Commander 13th Naval District 18 March 1946; she was decommissioned 5 June 1946, transferred to the Maritime Commission 29 June 1946, struck from the Navy list 3 July 1946, and scrapped in 1966.
