= USS Lumen =

Cargo ship of the United States Navy

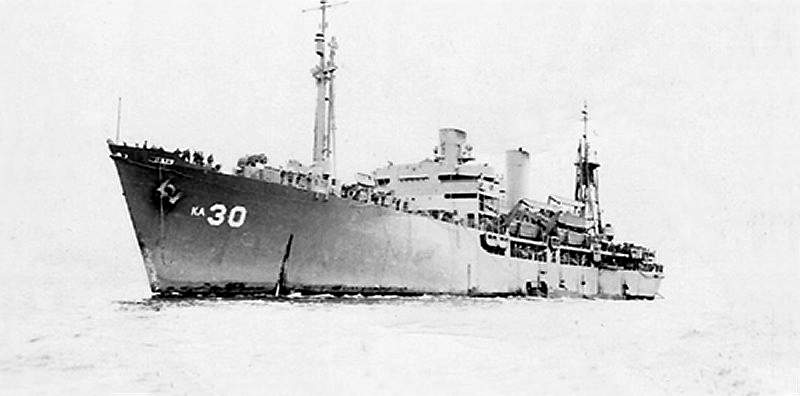

History

United States
- Name: USS Lumen
- Namesake: The asteroid Lumen
- Builder: Walsh-Kaiser Company, Providence, Rhode Island
- Laid down: 19 July 1944
- Launched: 20 November 1944
- Commissioned: 29 December 1944
- Decommissioned: 23 March 1946
- Honours and awards: 1 battle star (WWII)
- Fate: Sold for scrapping, 1964

General characteristics
- Class & type: Artemis-class attack cargo ship
- Type: S4–SE2–BE1
- Displacement: 4,087 long tons (4,153 t) light; 7,080 long tons (7,194 t) full
- Length: 426 ft (130 m)
- Beam: 58 ft (18 m)
- Draft: 16 ft 6 in (5.03 m)
- Speed: 17 knots (31 km/h; 20 mph)
- Complement: 303 officers and enlisted
- Armament: 1 × 5"/38 caliber gun mount; 4 × twin 40 mm gun mounts; 10 × 20 mm gun mounts

USS Lumen AKA-30 was an Artemis-class attack cargo ship in service with the United States Navy from 1944 to 1946. She was scrapped in 1964.

== History ==
Lumen (AKA–30) was named after the minor planet 141 Lumen, which in turn was named after an 1867 book by astronomer Camille Flammarion. She was laid down by Walsh-Kaiser Co., Inc. Providence, R.I., 19 July 1944 under a Maritime Commission contract; launched 20 November 1944; sponsored by Mrs. Alex Walker; and commissioned 29 December 1944.

After shakedown, Lumen departed Norfolk 29 January 1945, loaded troops and equipment at Pearl Harbor, then sailed for the Okinawa campaign, the largest amphibious operation of the Pacific War. Following brief stops in Eniwetok and Ulithi, the cargo ship arrived off Okinawa 17 April and under the threat of night air raids unloaded the men and cargo which were needed to secure this strategic base so close to Japan.

Departing Okinawa, Lumen arrived Saipan 27 April and for the rest of the war shuttled cargo among the islands in the South and central Pacific. She was at Pearl Harbor when news of Japan's acceptance of the surrender terms was announced.

Although the major task of winning the war was successfully completed, another important mission lay ahead for the Navy. Returning to the western Pacific in mid-September, Lumen carried cargo in the Philippines and Japan to provide the occupation troops with reinforcements and supplies. Completing her duties in the Pacific, the cargo ship embarked veterans for return to the United States and steamed for the West Coast arriving early in 1946. Lumen’s short but useful career ended when she decommissioned at Charleston 23 March 1946.

She was turned over to the War Shipping Administration 5 November 1946, placed in the National Defense Reserve Fleet, and was berthed at Beaumont, Texas, until sold for scrap to Luria Bros. Co., Inc., 17 December 1964.

== Awards ==
Lumen received one battle star for World War II service.
