= USS Hydrus =

Cargo ship of the United States Navy

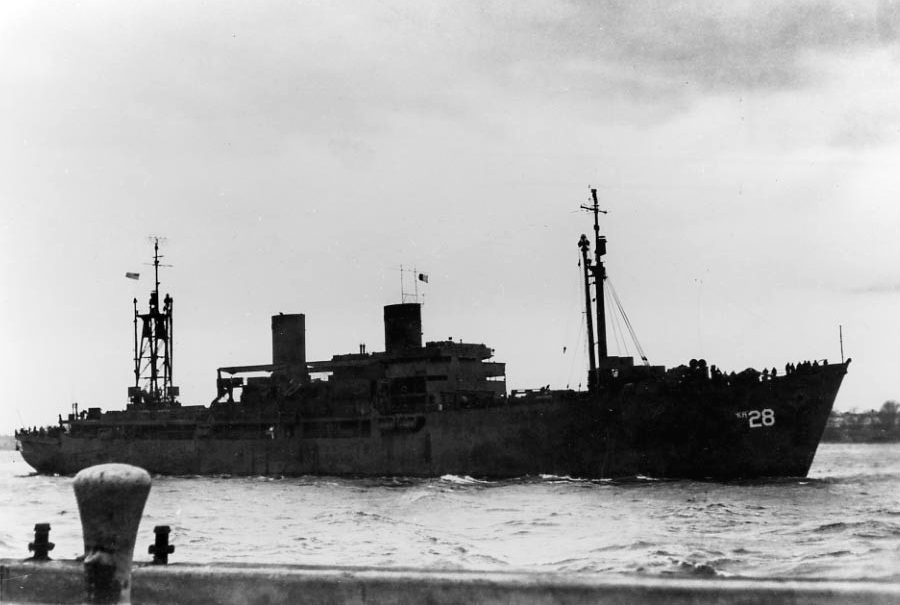

History

United States
- Name: USS Hydrus
- Namesake: The constellation Hydrus
- Builder: Walsh-Kaiser Company, Providence, Rhode Island
- Launched: 28 October 1944
- Commissioned: 9 December 1944
- Decommissioned: 26 March 1946
- Honours and awards: 1 battle star (WWII)
- Fate: Sold for scrapping, April 1964

General characteristics
- Class & type: Artemis-class attack cargo ship
- Type: S4–SE2–BE1
- Displacement: 4,087 long tons (4,153 t) light; 7,080 long tons (7,194 t) full
- Length: 426 ft (130 m)
- Beam: 58 ft (18 m)
- Draft: 15 ft 6 in (4.72 m)
- Speed: 17 knots (31 km/h; 20 mph)
- Complement: 303 officers and enlisted
- Armament: 1 × 5"/38 caliber gun mount; 4 × twin 40 mm gun mounts; 10 × 20 mm gun mounts

USS Hydrus (AKA-28) was an Artemis-class attack cargo ship in service with the United States Navy from 1944 to 1946. From 1946 to 1956, she served as the training ship Empire State II. She was scrapped in 1964.

== History ==
Hydrus (AKA-28) was named after the southern constellation Hydrus. She was launched under Maritime Commission contract by Walsh-Kaiser Co., Inc., Providence, R.I., 28 October 1944; sponsored by Mrs. Alexander Hylek; and commissioned 9 December.

=== 1944 ===
Hydrus departed Providence 22 December for Hampton Roads and her shakedown training, completing this phase of her operations early in January 1945. The attack transport got underway 7 January for the Pacific theater, sailing via the Canal Zone to Pearl Harbor, where she arrived 27 January.

=== 1945 ===
With the island campaign in the Pacific then entering its final phases, Hydrus sailed 1 February for Guadalcanal to participate in the extensive training operations for the projected invasion of Okinawa, the last objective before the mainland itself. Arriving 11 February, she took part in practice landings on Guadalcanal until 15 March, when her group, Task Force 53, sailed for the final staging area, Ulithi. The period after her arrival 21–26 March, was spent in final preparations for the giant invasion, and 27 March found Hydrus and other transports of Task Force 53 steaming toward Okinawa with Marines and their equipment. They arrived off the beaches 1 April and under the command of Vice Adm. Kelly Turner carried out the successful assault. Hydrus discharged her troops and equipment off the Hagushi beaches. Between 1–9 April the ship remained off the bitterly contested island, often undergoing heavy air attack. She departed 10 April for Guam and Pearl Harbor, arriving in Hawaii 26 April 1945.

Hydrus got underway 5 May for the United States, and arrived San Francisco six days later. After loading fresh cargo she once again sailed for Pearl Harbor, arriving 26 May. The next two months saw Hydrus operate temporarily as an inter-island cargo carrier, transporting supplies of various types among the myriad islands in the Hawaiian chain. After brief repairs, she sailed with a cargo for Christmas Island and Canton Island, but returned to Honolulu 3 August.

Slated for return to the western Pacific, Hydrus sailed 7 August for Ulithi and Okinawa. During this passage she received word of the war's end, and arrived at Okinawa to unload her cargo 3 September. Except for 16–18 September, when she got underway to ride out the great typhoon, Hydrus remained at anchor off Okinawa until 25 September. She then sailed to Manus to embark units of a Marine Air Group for the occupation of mainland China. The transport arrived at Tsingtao 17 October to put ashore her cargo and passengers, thus helping to speed the occupation and help stabilize the explosive internal situation in China. She subsequently embarked additional troops in the Philippines and carried them to Taku, China, 14 November.

Her role in the Chinese occupation over, Hydrus was assigned duty with "Magic Carpet", the gigantic operation for the return of Pacific veterans. She sailed from Shanghai 6 December and arrived at Seattle 23 December.

=== Post-war ===
Designated for return to the Maritime Commission, the ship sailed 11 January for the East Coast and arrived at New York 2 February. There Hydrus was selected as a training ship for the New York State Maritime Academy, and steamed up the East River to Fort Schuyler 6 March 1946. She decommissioned there 26 March and became Empire State II.

After a 10-year career as a training ship for future maritime officers, the ship was placed in the Maritime Commission's National Defense Reserve Fleet in June 1956. She remained there until being sold in April 1964 to Union Minerals & Alloys Corp., of New York, and scrapped.

== Awards ==
Hydrus received one battle star for World War II service.
