= USS Lacerta =

Cargo ship of the United States Navy

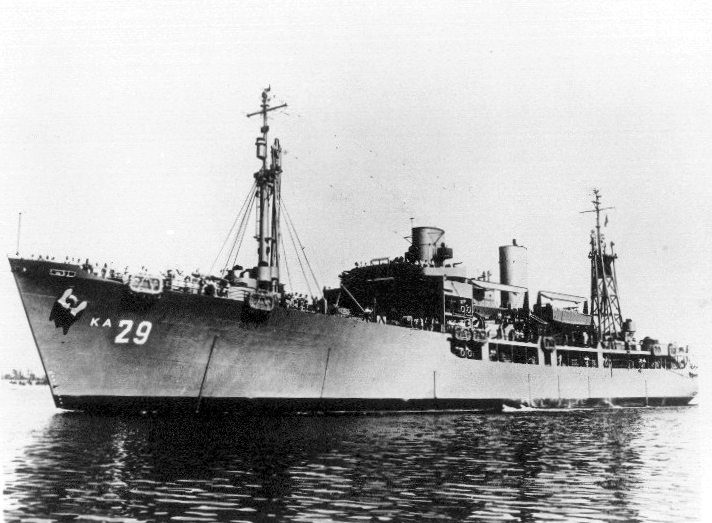

History

United States
- Name: USS Lacerta
- Namesake: The constellation Lacerta
- Builder: Walsh-Kaiser Company, Providence, Rhode Island
- Laid down: 5 July 1944
- Launched: 10 November 1944
- Commissioned: 19 December 1944
- Decommissioned: 25 March 1946
- Honours and awards: 1 battle star (WWII)
- Fate: Sold for scrapping, 18 August 1966

General characteristics
- Class & type: Artemis-class attack cargo ship
- Type: S4–SE2–BE1
- Displacement: 4,087 long tons (4,153 t) light; 7,080 long tons (7,194 t) full
- Length: 426 ft (130 m)
- Beam: 58 ft (18 m)
- Draft: 16 ft (4.9 m)
- Speed: 17 knots (31 km/h; 20 mph)
- Complement: 302 officers and enlisted
- Armament: 1 × 5"/38 caliber gun mount; 4 × twin 40 mm gun mounts; 10 × 20 mm gun mounts

USS Lacerta (AKA-29) was an Artemis-class attack cargo ship in service with the United States Navy from 1944 to 1946. She was scrapped in 1966.

== History ==
Lacerta (AKA-29) was named after the constellation Lacerta. She was laid down under a Maritime Commission contract 5 July 1944 by Walsh-Kaiser Co., Inc., Providence, R.I.; launched 10 November 1944; sponsored by Mrs. Frank Bratley; acquired by the Navy 19 December 1944; and commissioned the same day.

After shakedown, Lacerta cleared Norfolk 18 January 1945 for Pearl Harbor where she loaded hospital crew and cargo for the Solomon Islands. Arriving Guadalcanal 27 February, Lacerta discharged cargo and embarked troops for the Okinawa invasion. She departed Saipan 27 March for the operation that would advance American troops to a strategic position almost next door to Japan. Arriving in the transport area 1 April under heavy enemy air raids, the cargo ship remained off the southeast coast of Okinawa unloading supplies, 150 mm howitzers, and Marines from Guadalcanal for Marines fighting ashore.

Lacerta departed Okinawa 9 April for Saipan, where she remained until 3 June. In the months prior to Japan's surrender, she ferried cargo among the Solomon and Mariana Islands before arriving Manila 22 August. Loading troops and equipment there, Lacerta participated in the movement of occupation forces to Japan, arriving Yokohama 13 September. She then went to Hai Phong (French Indochina) took on 6,000 Chinese Nationalist troops (1,000 each in six ships) carrying them to Qinhuangdao at the northern tip of the Yellow Sea, remaining in the Far Fast until 19 November when she cleared Tsingtao, China, for Seattle.

After a short stay at Seattle, she left on 1 January 1946 Lacerta arrived Norfolk 12 February 1946 and decommissioned 25 March. She was returned to the Maritime Commission for disposal on 30 June 1946, for lay up in the National Defense Reserve Fleet, James River Group. Sold for scrapping to Union Minerals & Alloys Corporation on 18 August 1966.

== Awards ==
Lacerta received one battle star for World War II service.
