= 625 Xenia =

Main-belt asteroid

Discovery
- Discovered by: August Kopff
- Discovery site: Heidelberg
- Discovery date: 11 February 1907

Designations
- Pronunciation: /ˈziːniə/
- Alternative designations: 1907 XN

Orbital characteristics
- Epoch 31 July 2016 (JD 2457600.5)
- Uncertainty parameter 0
- Observation arc: 109.11 yr (39852 d)
- Aphelion: 3.2470 AU (485.74 Gm)
- Perihelion: 2.0428 AU (305.60 Gm)
- Semi-major axis: 2.6449 AU (395.67 Gm)
- Eccentricity: 0.22764
- Orbital period (sidereal): 4.30 yr (1571.1 d)
- Mean anomaly: 333.734°
- Mean motion: 0° 13^{m} 44.904^{s} / day
- Inclination: 12.077°
- Longitude of ascending node: 127.543°
- Argument of perihelion: 200.745°

Physical characteristics
- Mean radius: 14.185±0.95
- Synodic rotation period: 21.017 h (0.8757 d)
- Geometric albedo: 0.2195±0.033
- Absolute magnitude (H): 9.9

625 Xenia is a minor planet orbiting the Sun. It was discovered by August Kopff in Heidelberg, Germany, on 11 February 1907. The name may have been inspired by the asteroid's provisional designation 1907 XN.

== See also ==
- USS Xenia, a U.S. Navy ship apparently named for the minor planet
