= USS Artemis (AKA-21) =

Cargo ship of the United States Navy

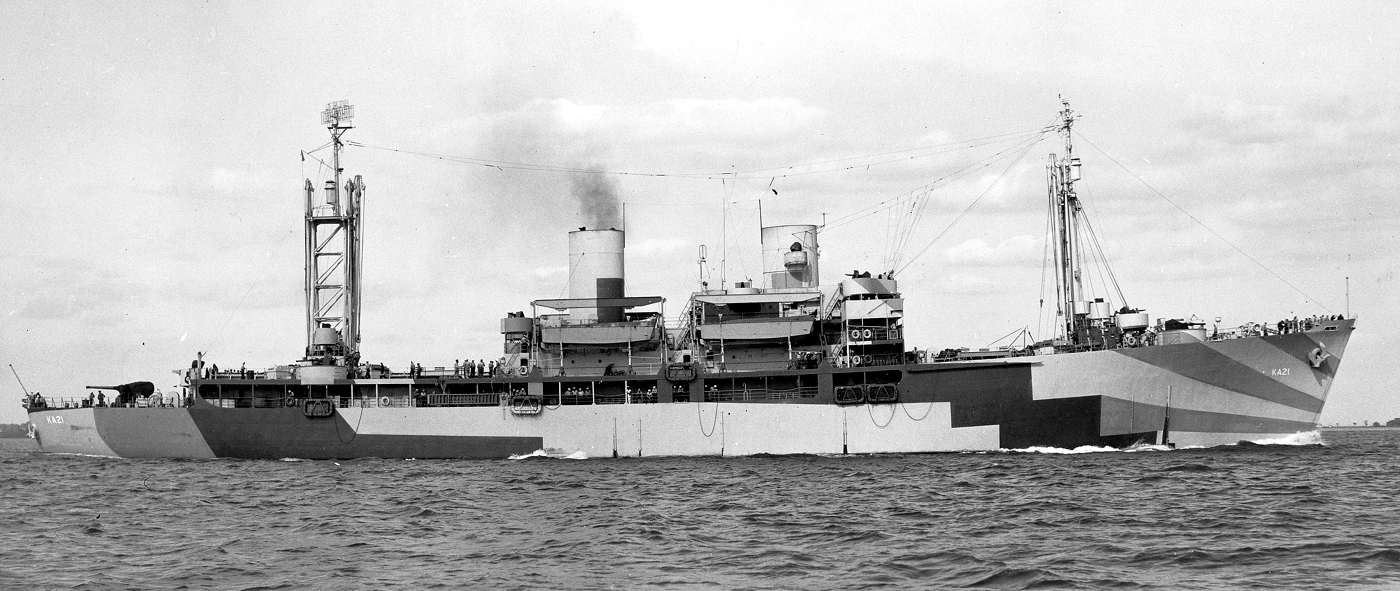

History

United States
- Name: Artemis
- Namesake: The asteroid Artemis
- Builder: Walsh-Kaiser Company, Providence, Rhode Island
- Laid down: 23 November 1943
- Launched: 20 May 1944
- Commissioned: 28 August 1944
- Decommissioned: 10 January 1947
- Stricken: 25 February 1947
- Honours and awards: 2 battle stars (WWII)
- Fate: Scrapped, 1966

General characteristics
- Class & type: Artemis-class attack cargo ship
- Type: S4–SE2–BE1
- Displacement: 4,087 long tons (4,153 t) light; 7,080 long tons (7,194 t) full
- Length: 426 ft (130 m)
- Beam: 58 ft (18 m)
- Draft: 16 ft (4.9 m)
- Speed: 16.9 knots (31.3 km/h; 19.4 mph)
- Complement: 303 officers and enlisted
- Armament: 1 × 5"/38 caliber gun mount; 4 × twin 40 mm gun mounts; 10 × 20 mm gun mounts

USS Artemis (AKA-21) was an Artemis-class attack cargo ship in service with the United States Navy from 1944 to 1947. She was scrapped in 1966.

== History ==
Artemis (AKA-21) was named after the asteroid 105 Artemis, which in turn was named after the Greek goddess Artemis.. She was laid down under a Maritime Commission contract (MC hull 1882) on 23 November 1943 at Providence, R.I., by the Walsh-Kaiser Co., Inc.; launched on 20 May 1944; sponsored by Mrs. Thomas J. Walsh; acquired by the Navy from the Maritime Commission on 28 August 1944; and placed in commission that same day.

=== 1944 ===
After fitting out at Boston, Mass., the attack cargo ship proceeded to the Chesapeake Bay for shakedown training. She then sailed to the naval supply depot at Bayonne, N.J., to embark naval passengers and supplies for transportation to the Pacific. The ship got underway on 12 October and transited the Panama Canal on the 17th. On that same date, she reported to Amphibious Forces, Pacific Fleet, and continued on toward the west coast. She reached San Diego, California, on the 26th and remained in port for one day. The vessel then shaped a course for Hawaii.

Artemis reached Pearl Harbor on 3 November and unloaded her passengers. One day later, she left Hawaiian waters to return to California. On 13 November, the ship arrived at Port Hueneme to take on pontoon equipment and carried this cargo to Pearl Harbor. While in Hawaii, she participated in a series of training exercises held off Pearl Harbor. On 5 December, Artemis left Hawaiian waters to return to the west coast. Once again, cargo was taken on at Port Hueneme, and the ship proceeded back to Hawaii, and Artemis spent the Christmas holidays in port at Pearl Harbor.

=== 1945 ===
On 4 January 1945, she proceeded to Kahului, Maui, to embark marines. The vessel got underway on 12 January with units of Task Force (TF) 51 for amphibious training exercises off Maui and arrived back at Pearl Harbor on the 18th. Nine days later, she sailed for Eniwetok with Task Group 53.2.

After spending two days at that atoll, Artemis got underway to participate in the invasion of the Volcano Islands. Steaming via Saipan, the ship anchored in Transport Area "Baker" off the southeast coast of Iwo Jima on 19 February. She then sent her boats to assist the transports during the initial assault. The attack cargo ship remained in the area through the 27th discharging troops and cargo and taking casualties on board during the day and retiring out to sea each night.

Artemis touched back at Saipan on 3 March. Three days later, she got underway for Ulithi and remained in port there during the next three weeks to resupply and undergo minor repairs. On 29 March, the vessel paused at Manus before getting underway for New Caledonia. She arrived at Nouméa on 4 April where she took on passengers and cargo before sailing on 3 May for Leyte, Philippine Islands.

The vessel reached Leyte on 16 May and began unloading operations the next day. Artemis headed for New Guinea on the 30th and touched at Hollandia on 3 June. Two days later, she moved to Oro Bay to take on cargo and troops. The ship sailed for the Philippines on 9 June, discharged her cargo at Manila, and then sailed to the Admiralty Islands. After pausing at Manus to refuel, Artemis proceeded to Lae, New Guinea, to pick up more troops and cargo. The loading was completed on 3 July, and the vessel got underway to return to the Philippines. She unloaded at Manila in mid-July before proceeding to Tacloban, Philippine Islands, to pick up troops and equipment for transportation to Hawaii.

Artemis sailed eastward on 31 July and reached Pearl Harbor two weeks later. She was discharging her cargo there when word of the Japanese capitulation was announced on 15 August. The vessel entered drydock at the Pearl Harbor Navy Yard on the 24th for overhaul. This work was completed in mid-September, and she embarked occupation troops for transportation to the Japanese home islands. On 3 October, Artemis moored at Yokosuka, Japan, and began discharging her passengers. She operated in Japanese waters until 24 November, when she set a course for the west coast of the United States. The vessel reached San Francisco, California, on 10 December and, ten days later, set out for the Philippines. Upon her arrival at Samar, Artemis embarked military personnel for transport back to the United States.

=== 1946 ===
She got underway on 21 January 1946 and made San Francisco on 9 February. The ship remained in port there until 20 March, when she headed for Hawaii. Upon her arrival at Pearl Harbor, the ship conducted logistic support operations for nearby naval activities until 15 May, when she was assigned to Joint Task Force 1 to support "Operation Crossroads," tests conducted at Bikini Atoll to learn of the effects of atomic bomb explosions upon warships. This assignment occupied the cargo ship through mid-August when she returned to Pearl Harbor and resumed local operations.

On 6 November, Artemis departed Hawaiian waters and shaped a course for the west coast. She reached San Francisco one week later, but left that port on the 23rd and proceeded to the Panama Canal Zone. After retransiting the canal, the ship continued on to Norfolk, Va., where she was decommissioned on 10 January 1947.

=== Decommissioning and fate ===
Her name was struck from the Navy list on 25 February 1947. The ship was transferred to the Maritime Administration on 1 April 1948 and was laid up in the National Defense Reserve Fleet in the James River. On 16 August 1966, she was sold to the Union Minerals & Alloys Corp., of New York City, and was subsequently scrapped.

Artemis earned two battle stars for her World War II service.
