= USS Turandot =

Cargo ship of the United States Navy

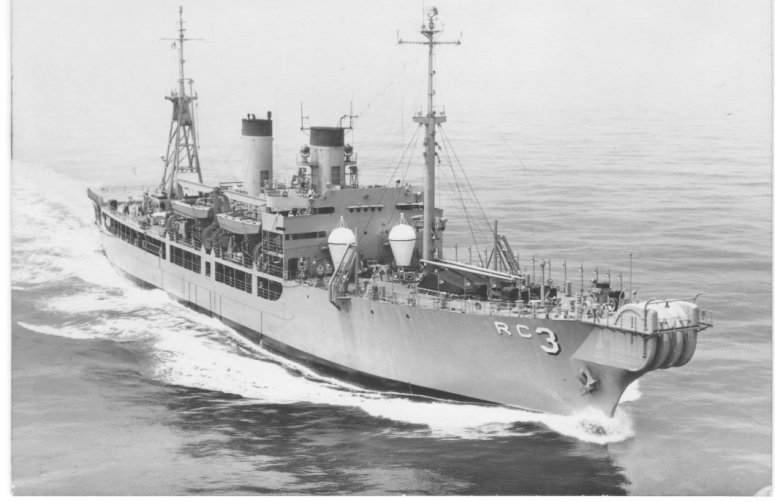
- USS Turandot after conversion to USS Aeolus

History

United States
- Name: USS Turandot
- Namesake: The asteroid Turandot
- Builder: Walsh-Kaiser Company, Providence, Rhode Island
- Laid down: 29 March 1945
- Launched: 20 May 1945
- Commissioned: 18 June 1945
- Decommissioned: 21 March 1946
- Stricken: 17 April 1947
- Fate: Recommissioned as USS Aeolus (ARC-3) in 1955

General characteristics
- Class & type: Artemis-class attack cargo ship
- Type: S4–SE2–BE1
- Displacement: 4,087 long tons (4,153 t) light; 7,080 long tons (7,194 t) full
- Length: 426 ft (130 m)
- Beam: 58 ft (18 m)
- Draft: 16 ft (4.9 m)
- Speed: 16.9 knots (31.3 km/h; 19.4 mph)
- Complement: 303 officers and enlisted
- Armament: 1 × 5"/38 caliber gun mount; 4 × twin 40 mm gun mounts; 10 × 20 mm gun mounts

USS Turandot (AKA-47) was an Artemis-class attack cargo ship named after the minor planet 530 Turandot, discovered by Max Wolf in 1904 and named by him after the title character in the Puccini opera of the same name.

Turandot (AKA-47) was laid down under Maritime Commission contract (MC hull 1908) on 29 March 1945 by the Walsh-Kaiser Co., Inc., Providence, R.I.; launched on 20 May 1945; sponsored by Mrs. Charles H. MacLeod; and commissioned on 18 June 1945.

== Service history ==
Following fitting out and conversion at the Boston Navy Yard, Turandot made her shakedown cruise in the Chesapeake Bay in July 1945. After undergoing availability at Norfolk, the new attack cargo ship took on passengers and cargo; then departed Hampton Roads on 24 July, bound for the Canal Zone. She transited the Panama Canal on 30 July and, early the next day, rendezvoused with the submarine Barbero for exercises en route to the Hawaiian Islands. On 10 August, she parted company and made her way independently to Oahu, arriving at Pearl Harbor on 14 August 1945.

After discharging her cargo, she embarked 172 Army troops and departed the Hawaiian Islands on 7 September, setting her course for the New Hebrides. She arrived at Espiritu Santo on the 17th, discharged her passengers, loaded cargo, and embarked elements of the 85th Construction Battalion.

On 22 September, she got underway for the Marshalls. After fueling at Eniwetok, she continued on and arrived at Wake Island on 6 October. The following day, she discharged her cargo and passengers and returned to Eniwetok to begin "Magic Carpet" duties, carrying troops back to the United States. She embarked more than 600 veterans, then got underway on 13 October and steamed via a great circle route to California. On Friday, 26 October, she entered San Pedro Harbor and disembarked her happy passengers. After voyage repairs at Terminal Island, she again got underway on 3 November, steaming for the Marianas. On the 19th, Turandot arrived at Saipan. This time, she was to serve as a magic carpet for more than a thousand returning troops. She departed Saipan on the 27th and completed the crossing at San Pedro on 12 December.

Voyage repairs occupied most of the remainder of the month. Turandot opened the new year with a voyage to San Diego; then, on the 24th, continued southward and steamed, via the Panama Canal, to the Atlantic. On 5 February, she arrived at Hampton Roads and was delivered on 25 June 1946 to the Maritime Commission for custody pending disposal. She decommissioned on 21 March 1946 and was struck from the Navy list on 17 April 1947.

== Recommissioning ==
On 4 November 1954, the former attack cargo ship was reacquired by the Navy to support Project Caesar, the unclassified name for the installation of the Sound Surveillance System (SOSUS). The ship was reclassified as a cable repair ship, redesignated ARC-3, and renamed Aeolus. Her conversion was completed on 15 May 1955 at Baltimore by the Key Highway Plant of the Bethlehem Steel Co. The ship was accepted for limited service and re-commissioned later that month.
