= USS Troilus =

Cargo ship of the United States Navy

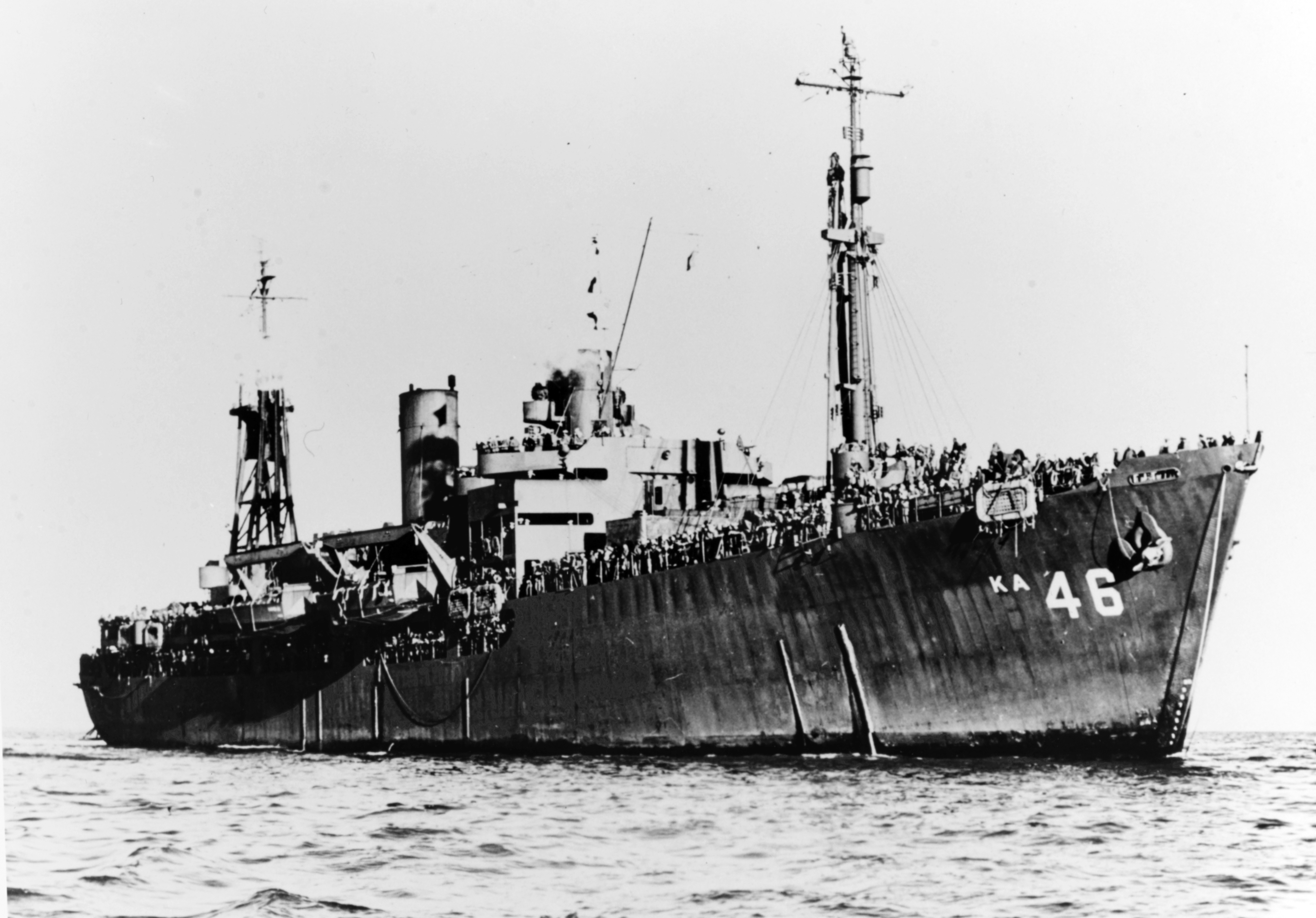

History

United States
- Name: USS Troilus
- Namesake: The asteroid Troilus
- Builder: Walsh-Kaiser Company, Providence, Rhode Island
- Laid down: 18 March 1945
- Launched: 11 May 1945
- Commissioned: 8 June 1945
- Decommissioned: 14 June 1946
- Stricken: 8 July 1946
- Fate: Sold for scrapping, 17 April 1967

General characteristics
- Class & type: Artemis-class attack cargo ship
- Type: S4–SE2–BE1
- Displacement: 4,087 long tons (4,153 t) light; 7,080 long tons (7,194 t) full
- Length: 426 ft (130 m)
- Beam: 58 ft (18 m)
- Draft: 16 ft (4.9 m)
- Speed: 16.9 knots (31.3 km/h; 19.4 mph)
- Complement: 303 officers and enlisted
- Armament: 1 × 5"/38 caliber gun mount; 4 × twin 40 mm gun mounts; 10 × 20 mm gun mounts

USS Troilus (AKA-46) was an Artemis-class attack cargo ship in service with the United States Navy from 1945 to 1946. She was scrapped in 1967.

== History ==
Troilus (AKA-46) was named after the minor planet 1208 Troilus, which in turn was named after a Trojan prince. the ship was laid down under a Maritime Commission contract (MC hull 1907) on 18 March 1945 at Providence, R.I., by the Walsh-Kaiser Co., Inc.; launched on 11 May 1945; sponsored by Mrs. Arthur G. B. Metcalf; acquired by the Navy and commissioned on 8 June 1945.

Following shakedown training in the Chesapeake Bay, Troilus departed Norfolk on 11 July and steamed independently via the Canal Zone to Hawaii. She arrived at Pearl Harbor on 1 August, disembarked passengers, fueled, and again got underway. Until 15 August, when the surrender of Japan was announced, she conducted intensive amphibious exercises in Maalaea Bay, Maui, operating with units of Transport Squadron 22.

With news of the war's end, she returned to Pearl Harbor and began loading ammunition, equipment, gasoline, trucks, trailers, and even airplanes for the occupation of Japan. On 7 September, Troilus departed the Hawaiian Islands and proceeded via the Marianas to Japan. She anchored in Wakayama harbor on the morning of 27 September and had all her boats in the water in less than 40 minutes. Despite continuous heavy rainfall and a rough eight-to-ten-foot surf which tossed two LCVP's high on the beach beyond retraction, Troilus unloaded cargo throughout the day. On the 29th, she disembarked over 200 troops from the 98th Division's 368th Field Artillery. After the successful completion of her mission, Troilus departed Wakayama on 1 October, bound for the Philippines.

Early in October, she stopped at Subic Bay and at Manila Bay before anchoring in Lingayen Gulf on the 12th to take on additional passengers and cargo for the occupation of Japan. She discharged troops at Wakayama harbor on the 25th, then continued on to anchor at Nagoya on the 27th. Early in November, she began "Magic Carpet" duties transporting American troops back to the United States. She embarked 485 passengers at Buckner Bay on 11 November; then set her course for California the following day. Troilus arrived at San Francisco on the morning of 29 November and lost no time in disembarking her homeward-bound passengers.

Following repairs at Graham Shipyard, Oakland, the attack cargo ship got underway for Japan on 24 December 1945, but en route received orders diverting her to Hawaii. Troilus put in at Pearl Harbor on 16 January and, on the 23d, set her course for California. She discharged passengers and mail at San Pedro on 30 January and then returned to San Francisco to take on a capacity load of landing craft for transportation to the East Coast. She departed that port on the 12th and steamed via the Panama Canal and Norfolk to New York. During March, crews removed equipment and gear from the vessel in preparation for her disposition. On 11 April, Troilus made her last voyage under her own power, steaming up the Hudson River to moor at the Eureka Shipyard, Newburgh, New York, to remove remaining materials and to undergo preservation procedures.

Her decommissioning took place minutes before noon on 14 June 1946. Her name was struck from the Navy list on 8 July 1946, and she was delivered to the War Shipping Administration on 28 August 1946. She was laid up by that agency until 17 April 1967 when she was sold to the Union Metals and Alloy Corporation, of New York City, and scrapped.
