= USS Sarita =

Cargo ship of the United States Navy

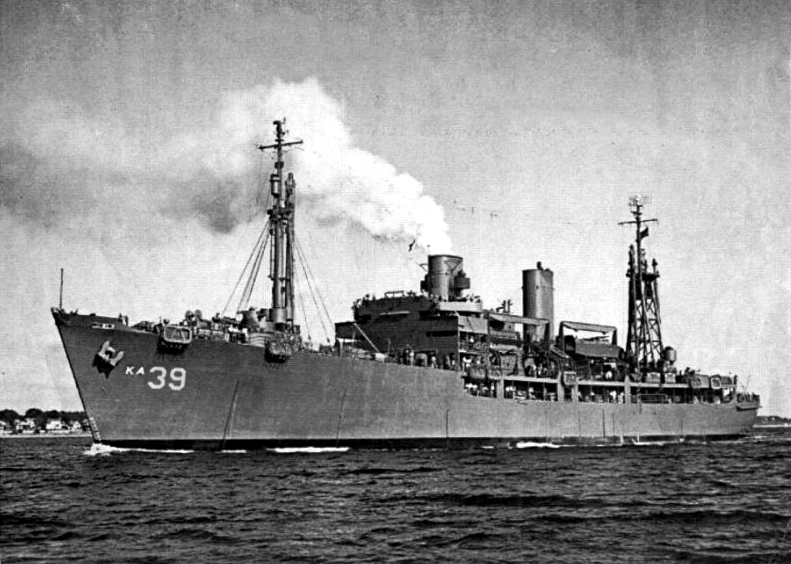

History

United States
- Name: USS Sarita
- Namesake: The asteroid Sarita
- Builder: Walsh-Kaiser Company, Providence, Rhode Island
- Laid down: 22 December 1944
- Launched: 23 February 1945
- Commissioned: 22 March 1945
- Decommissioned: 29 January 1947
- Stricken: 25 February 1947
- Fate: Sold for scrap in 1966

General characteristics
- Class & type: Artemis-class attack cargo ship
- Type: S4–SE2–BE1
- Displacement: 4,087 long tons (4,153 t) light; 7,080 long tons (7,194 t) full
- Length: 426 ft (130 m)
- Beam: 58 ft (18 m)
- Draft: 16 ft (4.9 m)
- Speed: 16.9 knots (31.3 km/h; 19.4 mph)
- Complement: 303 officers and enlisted
- Armament: 1 × 5"/38 caliber gun mount; 4 × twin 40 mm gun mounts; 10 × 20 mm gun mounts

USS Sarita (AKA-39) was an Artemis-class attack cargo ship in service with the United States Navy from 1945 to 1947. She was scrapped in 1966.

== History ==
Sarita (AKA-39) was named after the minor planet 796 Sarita.The name Sarita planet 796, what sets the astronomer Hugo Arturo Martinez, who determines the orbit, in honor of his girlfriend, Sarita Salas The ship was laid down on 22 December 1944 under a Maritime Commission contract (MC hull 1900) by Walsh-Kaiser Co., Inc., Providence, R.I.; launched on 23 February 1945; sponsored by Mrs. Manuel T. Sousa; and commissioned on 22 March 1945.

After shakedown, Sarita arrived in Newport, R.I., on 23 April 1945 to conduct afloat training for pre-commissioning crews of AKA's. She rode out a hurricane on 25 June and completed her training duty on 6 July.

On 20 July, the ship departed Norfolk, arriving at Pearl Harbor on 8 August. She sailed on 1 September with occupation troops for Japan, arriving at Sasebo on 22 September. She then made one voyage to Manila on 26 September, returning to Sasebo on 20 October, when she reported for "Magic Carpet" duty. Sarita made two voyages carrying troops home, one from Okinawa and one from Tokyo Bay, before being released from "Magic Carpet" duty at Seattle in early January. After overhaul in Portland, Oregon, the ship sailed for Guam on 6 February. She made two cargo voyages from Guam between 1 March and 30 June, calling at Saipan, Tokyo Bay, Tsingtao, Shanghai, Okinawa, the Philippines, and Manus. She returned to Puget Sound on 25 July, and arrived under tow at San Francisco on 17 November for inactivation.

Sarita was decommissioned on 29 January 1947 and simultaneously delivered to the Maritime Commission's National Defense Reserve Fleet at Suisun Bay, California. She was struck from the Navy list on 25 February 1947. On 8 June 1966, she was sold by the Maritime Administration to Zidell Explorations, Inc., for scrapping.
