= USS Aurelia =

Cargo ship of the United States Navy

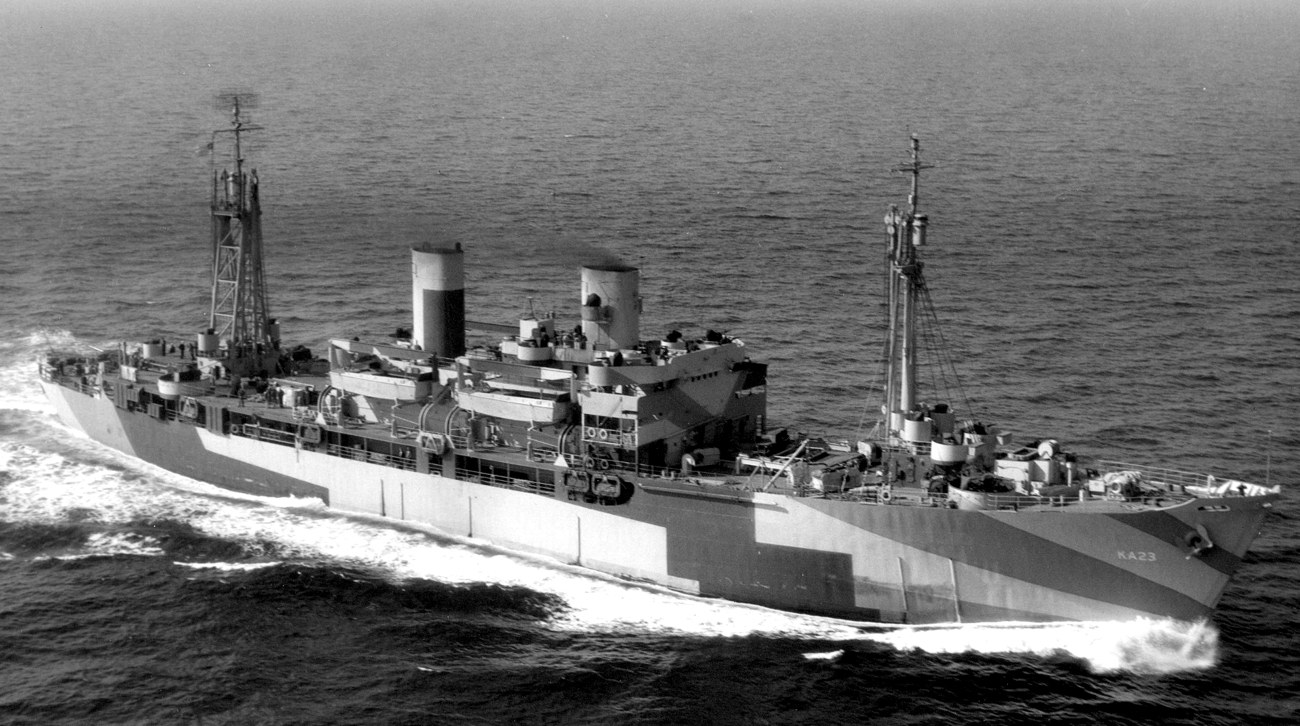

History

United States
- Name: USS Aurelia
- Namesake: The asteroid Aurelia
- Builder: Walsh-Kaiser Company, Providence, Rhode Island
- Laid down: 5 February 1944
- Launched: 4 July 1944
- Commissioned: 14 October 1944
- Decommissioned: 14 March 1946
- Stricken: 19 June 1946
- Honours and awards: 1 battle star (WWII)
- Fate: Transferred to the Maritime Commission, scrapped 1972

General characteristics
- Class & type: Artemis-class attack cargo ship
- Type: S4–SE2–BE1
- Displacement: 4,087 long tons (4,153 t) light; 7,080 long tons (7,194 t) full
- Length: 426 ft (130 m)
- Beam: 58 ft (18 m)
- Draft: 16 ft (4.9 m)
- Speed: 16.9 knots (31.3 km/h; 19.4 mph)
- Complement: 303 officers and enlisted
- Armament: 1 × 5"/38 caliber gun mount; 4 × twin 40 mm gun mounts; 10 × 20 mm gun mounts

USS Aurelia (AKA-23) was an Artemis-class attack cargo ship in service with the United States Navy from 1944 to 1946. She was scrapped in 1972.

== History ==
Aurelia (AKA-23) was laid down under a Maritime Commission contract (MC hull 1884) on 5 February 1944 at Providence, R.I., by the Walsh-Kaiser Co., Inc.; launched on 4 July 1944; sponsored by Mrs. Roy P. Mills; and acquired and commissioned on 14 October 1944. Her name is Latin and means The Golden One.

=== 1944 ===
In early November 1944, the attack cargo ship got underway for shakedown training in the Chesapeake Bay. She arrived at Norfolk, Va., on the 23d to embark troops and load cargo, sailed on the 28th for Hawaii – via the Panama Canal – and reached Pearl Harbor on 17 December.

=== 1945 ===
Aurelia got underway on 5 January 1945 to carry troops and cargo to Eniwetok and Guam. She returned to Hawaii on 5 February to embark more troops. On the 13th, the ship sailed, via Eniwetok, for the Philippines. She dropped anchor at Leyte on 4 March and began unloading her cargo the next day. On 6 March, she embarked combat troops scheduled to assault Okinawa and got underway for training maneuvers. Three weeks later, the attack cargo ship headed for the Ryukyus. On 1 April, D day for the landings on Okinawa, she entered the transport area and began lowering her boats. Aurelia continued to operate in that embattled area until 14 April when she headed for Saipan. On the 16th, she continued on toward Hawaii. After a four-day stay in Pearl Harbor, the ship sailed for the California coast and arrived at Alameda on 12 May.

The vessel moved to San Diego on 7 June for amphibious training exercises. She began loading her cargo at San Pedro on 24 June and put to sea on the 30th. Aurelia reached Pearl Harbor on 6 July and, 10 days later, sailed for Saipan, via Eniwetok. She returned to Pearl Harbor on 12 August. While she was in port there, word of Japan's capitulation on 15 August reached the ship. Aurelia embarked Marines slated for occupation duty and got underway on 1 September for Japan. The ship debarked her passengers at Sasebo and sailed on 26 September for the Philippines to pick up Army troops and equipment for transportation to Sasebo.

The vessel reached Sasebo on 21 October and was then assigned to the Magic Carpet fleet. She received on board Marine Corps personnel for passage back to the United States and delivered them to San Francisco on 13 November. She stood out to sea on the 29th for her last round-trip voyage to the Orient, embarked another contingent of veterans in Japan, and arrived back in San Francisco on 16 January 1946.

=== Decommissioning and fate ===
On 24 January, Aurelia sailed, via the Panama Canal, for the Gulf Coast. She reached New Orleans, La., on 7 February and was decommissioned at Orange, Texas, on 14 March 1946. The ship was then transferred to the Maritime Commission, and her name was struck from the Navy list on 19 June 1946. She was sold for scrap in 1972.

Aurelia earned one battle star for World War II service.
