= USS Veritas =

Cargo ship of the United States Navy

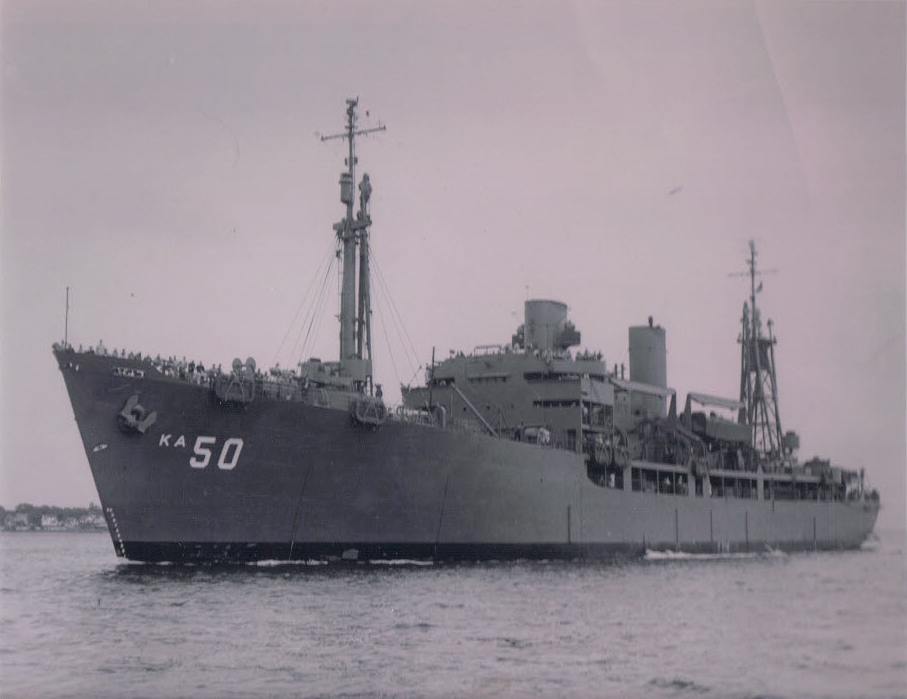

History

United States
- Name: USS Veritas
- Namesake: The asteroid Veritas
- Builder: Walsh-Kaiser Company, Providence, Rhode Island
- Laid down: 26 April 1945
- Launched: 16 June 1945
- Commissioned: 19 July 1945
- Decommissioned: 21 February 1946
- Stricken: 12 April 1946
- Fate: Scrapped 1967

General characteristics
- Class & type: Artemis-class attack cargo ship
- Type: S4–SE2–BE1
- Displacement: 4,087 long tons (4,153 t) light; 7,080 long tons (7,194 t) full
- Length: 426 ft (130 m)
- Beam: 58 ft (18 m)
- Draft: 16 ft (4.9 m)
- Speed: 16.9 knots (31.3 km/h; 19.4 mph)
- Complement: 303 officers and enlisted
- Armament: 1 × 5"/38 caliber gun mount; 4 × twin 40 mm gun mounts; 10 × 20 mm gun mounts

USS Veritas (AKA-50) was an Artemis-class attack cargo ship in service with the United States Navy from 1945 to 1946. She was scrapped in 1967.

== History ==
Veritas (AKA-50) was named after the minor planet 490 Veritas. She was laid down under a Maritime Commission contract (MC hull 1911) on 26 April 1945 at Providence, R.I., by the Walsh-Kaiser Co., Inc.; launched on 16 June 1945; sponsored by Mrs. Fred B. Smith; and commissioned on 19 July 1945.

Into the fall of 1945, Veritas operated along the East Coast, making cargo runs which took her as far north as Boston and ranged south to Hampton Roads, Va. After loading cargo at Norfolk from 22 October to 26 October, Veritas got underway on the 26th for Bermuda and the only duty which took her away from the eastern seaboard of the United States.

The cargo vessel returned to Norfolk and transported cargo to Baltimore in December and made stops at Bayonne, N.J., and New York City before heading for Hampton Roads early in 1946. She arrived at Norfolk on 17 January 1946 and was decommissioned on 21 February 1946. Struck from the Navy list on 12 April 1946, the cargo vessel was delivered to the Maritime Commission on 29 June 1946.
