= USS Sidonia =

Cargo ship of the United States Navy

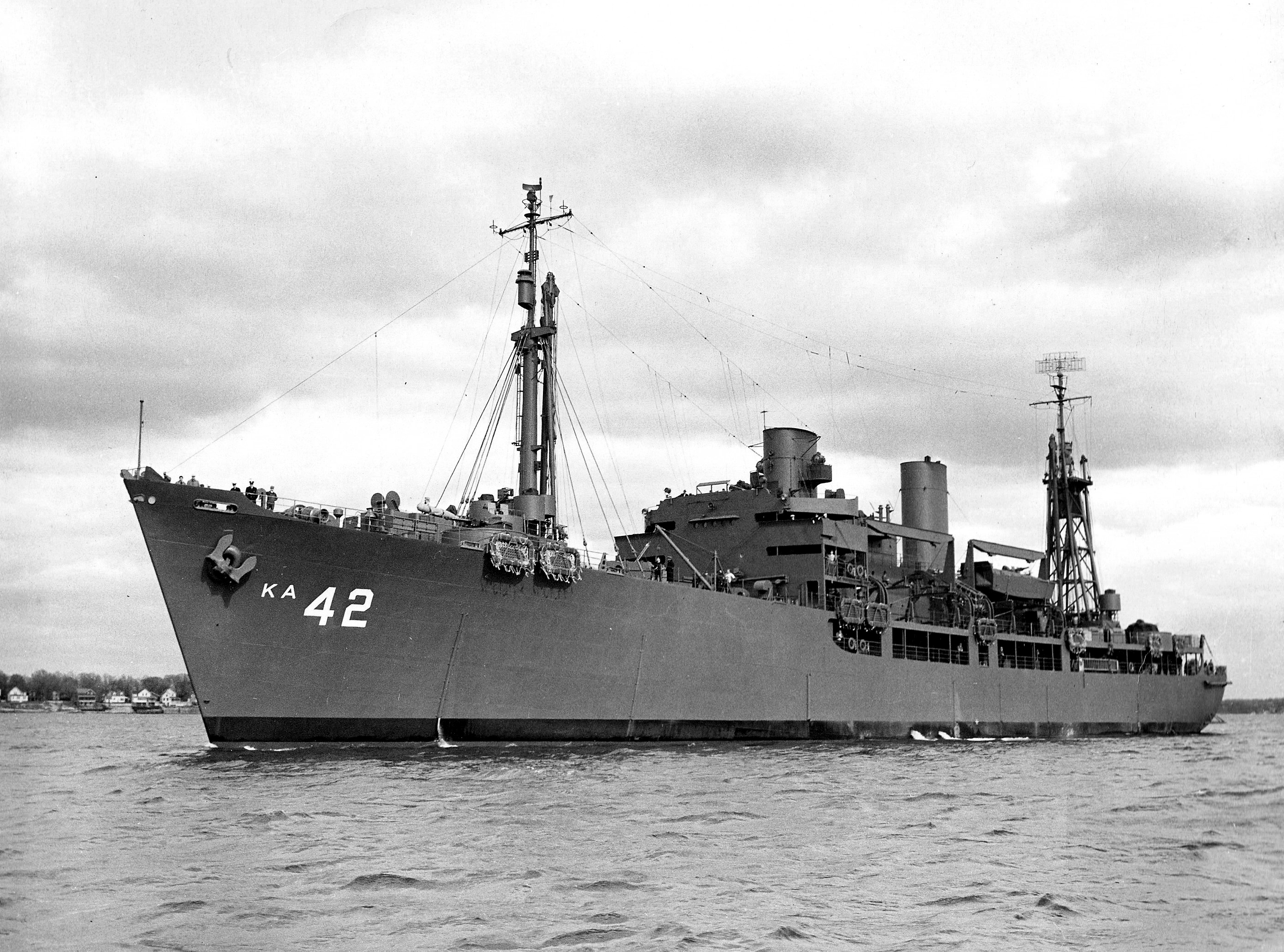

History

United States
- Name: USS Sidonia
- Namesake: The asteroid Sidonia
- Builder: Walsh-Kaiser Company, Providence, Rhode Island
- Laid down: 1 February 1945
- Launched: 7 April 1945
- Commissioned: 30 April 1945
- Decommissioned: 25 February 1946
- Stricken: 17 April 1946
- Fate: Sold for scrapping, 7 December 1964

General characteristics
- Class & type: Artemis-class attack cargo ship
- Type: S4–SE2–BE1
- Displacement: 4,087 long tons (4,153 t) light; 7,080 long tons (7,194 t) full
- Length: 426 ft (130 m)
- Beam: 58 ft (18 m)
- Draft: 16 ft (4.9 m)
- Speed: 16.9 knots (31.3 km/h; 19.4 mph)
- Complement: 303 officers and enlisted
- Armament: 1 × 5"/38 caliber gun mount; 4 × twin 40 mm gun mounts; 10 × 20 mm gun mounts

USS Sidonia (AKA-42) was an Artemis-class attack cargo ship in service with the United States Navy from 1945 to 1946. She was scrapped in 1964.

== History ==
Sidonia (AKA-42) was named after the minor planet 579 Sidonia, which in turn was named for a character in the opera Armide, by Christoph Willibald Gluck. The ship was laid down on 1 February 1945 under Maritime Commission contract (MC hull 1903) by the Walsh-Kaiser Co., Inc., Providence, R.I.; launched on 7 April 1945; sponsored by Mrs. Gustave Metzman; and commissioned on 30 April 1945.

Sidonia's sea trials were interrupted when she struck a derelict off Cape Cod on 11 May 1945, and repairs to her port propeller and to metallurgical defects in her port shafting lasted until 31 May.

The ship arrived at Norfolk on 3 June and underwent shakedown in Hampton Roads and Chesapeake Bay from 4–13 June. After post-shakedown repairs, she sailed on 23 June for France, arriving at Marseille on 4 July. There she loaded 216 troops with their supplies and sailed on 14 July for the Pacific, transiting the Panama Canal on 28 and 29 July, and calling at Eniwetok from 18–21 August. On 22 August, Sidonia's starboard engine was disabled by an electrical ground, and it remained out of commission during the rest of the ship's career.

Sidonia arrived at Lingayen Gulf on 31 August and disembarked her troops and cargo. On 13 September, a fire disabled her port engine, and repairs lasted until 24 September. The ship arrived at Manila on 29 September and departed on 7 October with 322 homeward-bound servicemen, whom she disembarked at Portland, Oregon, on 9 November. There her engines were dismantled; but, on 18 December, repairs were suspended and the ship was ordered deactivated.

Sidonia was decommissioned at Everett, Washington, on 25 February 1946; struck from the Navy list on 17 April 1946; and transferred to the War Shipping Administration on 29 June 1946 for retention in the National Defense Reserve Fleet at Olympia, Washington. Sidonia was sold on 7 December 1964 to Zidell Explorations, Inc., Portland, Oregon, for scrapping.
