= USS Sappho (AKA-38) =

Cargo ship of the United States Navy

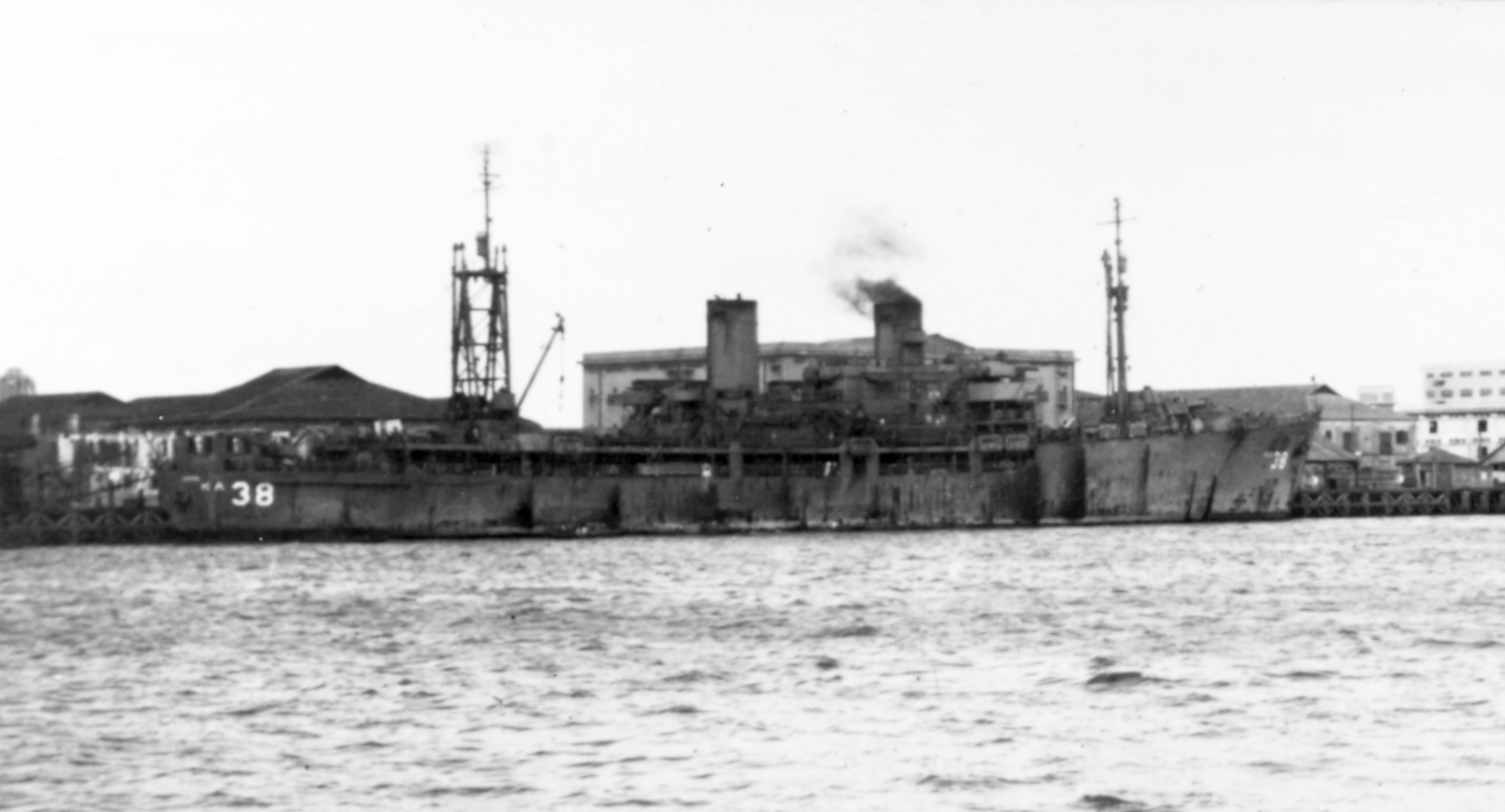

History

United States
- Name: USS Sappho
- Namesake: The asteroid Sappho
- Builder: Walsh-Kaiser Company, Providence, Rhode Island
- Laid down: 12 December 1944
- Launched: 3 March 1945
- Commissioned: 24 April 1945
- Decommissioned: 23 May 1946
- Stricken: 15 October 1946
- Fate: Sold for scrap in 1965

General characteristics
- Class & type: Artemis-class attack cargo ship
- Type: S4–SE2–BE1
- Displacement: 4,087 long tons (4,153 t) light; 7,080 long tons (7,194 t) full
- Length: 426 ft (130 m)
- Beam: 58 ft (18 m)
- Draft: 16 ft (4.9 m)
- Speed: 16.9 knots (31.3 km/h; 19.4 mph)
- Complement: 303 officers and enlisted
- Armament: 1 × 5"/38 caliber gun mount; 4 × twin 40 mm gun mounts; 10 × 20 mm gun mounts

USS Sappho (AKA-38) was an Artemis-class attack cargo ship in service with the United States Navy from 1945 to 1946. She was scrapped in 1965.

== History ==
Sappho (AKA-38) was named for the minor planet 80 Sappho, which in turn was named for the Greek poet Sappho. She was laid down on 12 December 1944 under Maritime Commission contract (MC hull 1899) by the Walsh-Kaiser Co., Inc., Providence, R.I.; launched on 3 March 1945; sponsored by Mrs. J. G. Stone; and commissioned on 24 April 1945.

After shakedown, Sappho sailed on 28 May 1945 from Norfolk, with cargo and personnel for Honolulu, where she arrived on 18 June. On 29 June, she got underway for Palmyra Atoll and Fanning Island, returning to Honolulu on 11 July. The ship began amphibious training off Maui Island on 4 August but terminated the exercises shortly after the Japanese capitulation in mid-August. On 1 September, she departed Pearl Harbor with occupation troops for Japan, arriving at Sasebo on 22 September. She then made a trip to Manila, returning to Sasebo on 20 October where she reported for "Magic Carpet" duty. Sappho made two voyages carrying troops home; one from Sasebo, Japan, and one from Shanghai, China, before she was released from "Magic Carpet" duty at Seattle on 10 January 1946.

Sappho was decommissioned on 23 May 1946 at Seattle, struck from the Navy list on 15 October 1946, and delivered to the Maritime Commission's reserve fleet at Olympia, Washington, on 13 January 1947. She was sold by the Maritime Administration on 7 September 1965 to Zidell Explorations, Inc., for scrapping.
