= USS Birgit =

Cargo ship of the United States Navy

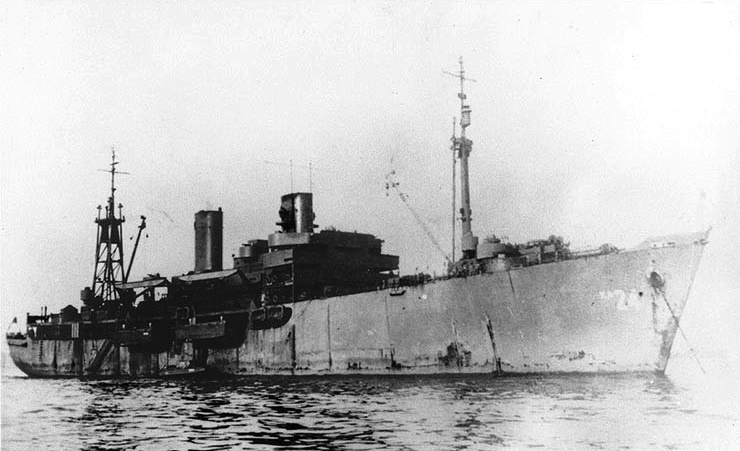
- USS Birgit (AKA-24)

History

United States
- Name: USS Birgit
- Namesake: The asteroid Birgit
- Builder: Walsh-Kaiser Company, Providence, Rhode Island
- Laid down: 22 February 1944
- Launched: 18 July 1944
- Commissioned: 28 October 1944
- Decommissioned: 15 March 1946
- Stricken: 21 May 1946
- Fate: Broken up 1971

General characteristics
- Class & type: Artemis-class attack cargo ship
- Type: S4–SE2–BE1
- Displacement: 4,087 long tons (4,153 t) light; 7,000 long tons (7,112 t) full
- Length: 426 ft (130 m)
- Beam: 58 ft (18 m)
- Draft: 16 ft (4.9 m)
- Speed: 16.9 knots (31.3 km/h; 19.4 mph)
- Complement: 302 officers and enlisted
- Armament: 1 × 5"/38 caliber gun mount; 4 × twin 40 mm gun mounts; 10 × 20 mm gun mounts

USS Birgit (AKA-24) was an Artemis-class attack cargo ship named after the minor planet 960 Birgit, which in turn was named after a daughter of Swedish astronomer Bror Ansgar Asplind. USS Birgit served as a commissioned ship for 16 months.

Birgit (AKA 24) was laid down on 22 February 1944 at Providence, R.I., by Walsh-Kaiser Co., Inc., under a Maritime Commission contract (MC hull 1885); launched on 18 July 1944; sponsored by Mrs. Ella A. Cunard; and commissioned on 28 October 1944.

== Service history ==
=== 1944 ===
Following fitting out at Boston, Mass., the attack cargo ship sailed for the Chesapeake Bay in mid-November. After shakedown training, the new attack cargo ship entered the Norfolk Navy Yard late on 4 November for repairs and alterations. This work was completed at the end of the month, and she sailed for Bayonne, N.J. on 30 November. There, the ship loaded cargo and embarked passenger, before sailing for the Pacific on 6 December. Escorted by Haas (DE-424), Birgit steamed to Panama, transiting the canal on the 12th and leaving the Canal Zone very early on the 13th. Proceeding singly to Hawaii, the ship reached Pearl Harbor on Christmas Day 1944, after having paused en route to render medical aid to SS S. B. Hunt on the 21st.

=== 1945 ===
After disembarking her passengers and discharging her cargo, the ship shifted to Honolulu on 5 January 1945 and immediately began loading cargo for the Army's 752d Anti Aircraft (AA) Battalion. On the 7th, she embarked 235 soldiers attached to the unit, and sailed independently for the Marshall Islands on the 8th. Reaching Eniwetok on the 16th, Birgit tarried there for a week, topping off her fuel bunkers from Chotauk (IX-188) before leaving the lagoon on the 23d for a round-trip voyage to Saipan and back. The attack cargo ship made Saipan on the 27th and returned to Eniwetok on 3 February. At this point, turbine damage forced Birgit to return to Hawaii for repairs. She set sail alone on 5 February, reached Oahu on the 15th, and entered the Pearl Harbor Navy Yard on the 19th.

Following this availability, Birgit trained near Maui, practicing amphibious landings and tactical maneuvers between 24 March and 29 March. The attack cargo ship then returned to her cargo hauling duties, taking on board freight at Honolulu on the 30th and embarking 235 soldiers on 1 April. Sailing that afternoon for the Marshalls and Marianas, Birgit visited Eniwetok from 10 April to 11 April and Saipan from 14 April to 28 April before she discharged her remaining cargo at Guam on the 28th. This task completed, she sailed for Eniwetok and, for almost four months, served the Commander, Marshalls Gilberts Area, making interisland cargo runs to such places as Eniwetok, Kwajalein, Majuro, and Tarawa.

While Birgit performed the prosaic, but vital, cargo-carrying tasks in the rear areas, the Allied war effort came to a victorious conclusion, sped along by two atomic bombs. V-J Day found Birgit at Eniwetok atoll. On 22 August, after taking on fuel from Meredosia (IX-193), the attack cargo ship got underway for the Philippines as part of 5th Fleet's Amphibious Group 8 and arrived at Guiuan Roadstead off Samar on the 29th. She then sailed for Manila on 4 September and reached that port late on the 6th.

Three days later, Birgit sailed for Lingayen Gulf, routed via Subic Bay, and anchored off Aringay Point on 10 September. There, she loaded 785 tons of ammunition, vehicles, gasoline, and rations, completing the evolution early on the 15th. She then embarked 225 men of the Army's 33d Infantry Division. Birgit took part in a landing rehearsal at Aringay Point on the 17th and then sailed for Japan on the 20th.

Birgit navigated the 600 yard swept channel passing through Kii Suido between Shikoku and Honshū and arrived off Wakayama before dawn on 25 September. Reaching her assigned position off the beachhead at 06:23, Birgit lowered her landing craft, getting them all waterborne within 10 minutes. Then, she proceeded to the inner anchorage area, where she anchored at 10:25. An hour later, she started discharging cargo, using her landing craft. Still, lack of lighterage kept the unloading moving slowly for the balance of the day. The supply of boats improved on the 26th and Birgit's cargo operations speeded up correspondingly. By 17:30, she had unloaded her cargo and disembarked her troops.

Birgit's part in the occupation completed, she weighed anchor on the 27th, sailing for Leyte in company with Duplin (AKA-87), Washburn (AKA-108) and Henninger (DE-476). Routed via Subic Bay, Birgit reached Leyte's San Pedro Bay on 5 October, tarrying there briefly before shifting south to Mindanao, anchoring in Davao Gulf on the 8th. There, the attack cargo ship embarked 135 men of the Army's 21st Regimental Combat Team and loaded 795 tons of cargo. Clearing Davao Gulf on 15 October, Birgit headed back to Japan, arriving at Hiro Wan, off Honshū, on late the 21st. She unloaded her cargo and disembarked her troops at Matsuyama early on the 23rd.

At that point in time, Birgit joined the armada of ships assigned to Operation "Magic Carpet" duty, as she lay in Hiro Wan. Sailing for Okinawa on the 30th, she reached Buckner Bay on 1 November and embarked 407 returning servicemen the following afternoon. She weighed anchor for the United States shortly thereafter and arrived at San Francisco on 17 November. After repairs at the Kaiser dockyard at Richmond, California, Birgit sailed for the Philippines on the 25th, making Guiuan Roadstead at Samar on 13 December. Two days later, Birgit sailed for San Francisco once more with 478 homeward bound men and reached her destination on New Year's Day 1946.

=== Decommissioning ===
Released from "Magic Carpet" duty on arrival in San Francisco, the attack cargo ship was soon authorized for disposal. Sailing from the west coast on 28 January 1946, Birgit headed for the Gulf Coast and inactivation. Clearing the Panama Canal on 11 February 1946, she finally reached Orange, Texas, on 10 March 1946via New Orleans. Birgit was placed out of commission at Orange on 15 March 1946, and her name was struck from the Navy list on 21 May 1946. The ship was delivered to the Maritime Commission on 1 July 1946 at Mobile, Alabama, for further disposition. She was broken up during 1971 at New York.
