= 530 Turandot =

Main-belt asteroid

Discovery
- Discovered by: Max Wolf
- Discovery site: Heidelberg
- Discovery date: 11 April 1904

Designations
- Pronunciation: /ˈtjʊərəndɒt/
- Alternative designations: 1904 NV

Orbital characteristics
- Epoch 31 July 2016 (JD 2457600.5)
- Uncertainty parameter 0
- Observation arc: 111.88 yr (40863 d)
- Aphelion: 3.8850 AU (581.19 Gm)
- Perihelion: 2.4865 AU (371.98 Gm)
- Semi-major axis: 3.1858 AU (476.59 Gm)
- Eccentricity: 0.21949
- Orbital period (sidereal): 5.69 yr (2076.9 d)
- Mean anomaly: 92.1597°
- Mean motion: 0° 10^{m} 23.988^{s} / day
- Inclination: 8.5603°
- Longitude of ascending node: 129.169°
- Argument of perihelion: 200.102°

Physical characteristics
- Mean diameter: 89±2 km
- Synodic rotation period: 19.95232±0.000009 h 19.95239±0.00009 h (alternate pole solution)
- Pole ecliptic longitude: 223° ± 9° 39° ± 6° (alternate pole solution)
- Pole ecliptic latitude: 60° ± 9° 31° ± 11° (alternate pole solution)
- Geometric albedo: 0.0472±0.003
- Spectral type: F
- Absolute magnitude (H): 9.37

530 Turandot is a minor planet orbiting the Sun that was discovered by German astronomer Max Wolf on 11 April 1904 and named for the title character in a play by Carlo Gozzi that was to become best known as an opera Turandot by Puccini.

Photometric observations of this asteroid in 1986 gave a light curve with a period of 10.77 ± 0.03 hours and a brightness variation of 0.13 ± 0.02 in magnitude. The curve is asymmetrical with dual maxima and minima. This object has a spectrum that matches an F-type classification.
