= 611 Valeria =

Main-belt asteroid

Discovery
- Discovered by: Joel Hastings Metcalf
- Discovery site: Taunton, Massachusetts
- Discovery date: 24 September 1906

Designations
- Pronunciation: /vəˈlɪəriə/
- Alternative designations: 1906 VL

Orbital characteristics
- Epoch 31 July 2016 (JD 2457600.5)
- Uncertainty parameter 0
- Observation arc: 114.46 yr (41807 d)
- Aphelion: 3.3397 AU (499.61 Gm)
- Perihelion: 2.6243 AU (392.59 Gm)
- Semi-major axis: 2.9820 AU (446.10 Gm)
- Eccentricity: 0.11996
- Orbital period (sidereal): 5.15 yr (1880.9 d)
- Mean anomaly: 71.676°
- Mean motion: 0° 11^{m} 29.04^{s} / day
- Inclination: 13.445°
- Longitude of ascending node: 189.431°
- Argument of perihelion: 257.146°

Physical characteristics
- Mean radius: 28.485±0.7 km
- Synodic rotation period: 6.977 h (0.2907 d)
- Geometric albedo: 0.1148±0.006
- Absolute magnitude (H): 9.19

611 Valeria is a minor planet orbiting the Sun that was discovered by American astronomer Joel Hastings Metcalf on September 24, 1906, from Taunton, Massachusetts. The name may have been inspired by the asteroid's provisional designation 1906 VL.

Photometric observations of this asteroid at the Organ Mesa Observatory in Las Cruces, New Mexico, during 2012 gave a light curve with a period of 6.977 ± 0.001 hours and a brightness variation of 0.08 ± 0.01 in magnitude. This result is consistent with a previous study from 2008.
