= USS Polana =

Cargo ship of the United States Navy

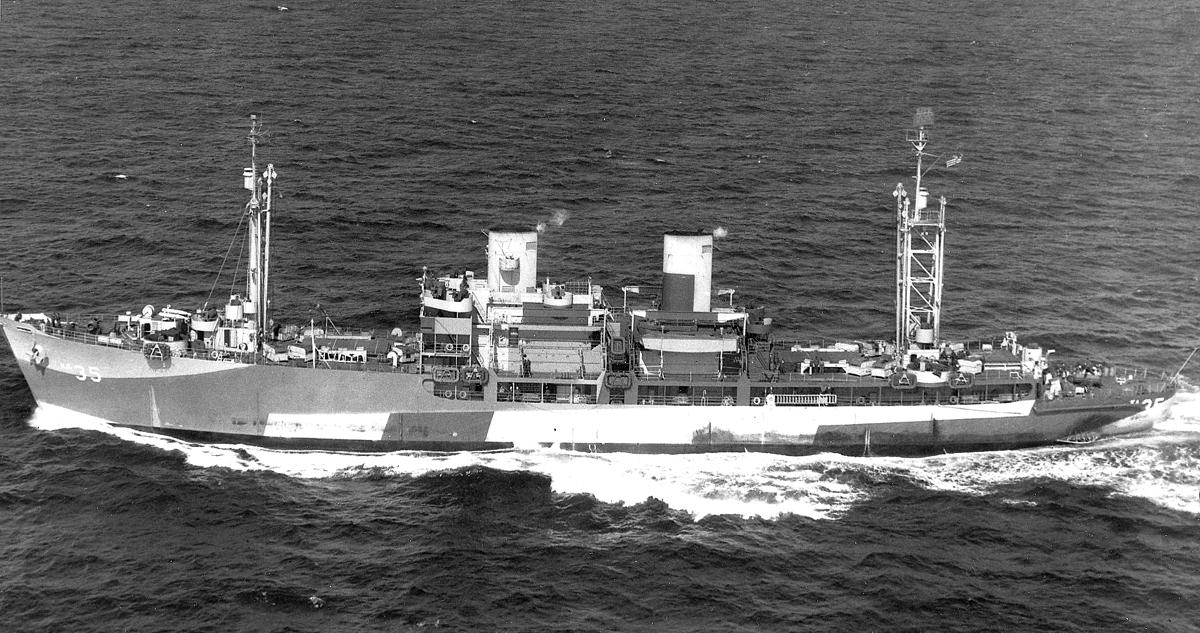

History

United States
- Name: USS Polana
- Namesake: The asteroid Polana
- Builder: Walsh-Kaiser Company, Providence, Rhode Island
- Laid down: 11 December 1944
- Launched: 17 January 1945
- Commissioned: 21 February 1945
- Decommissioned: 21 March 1946
- Stricken: 26 June 1946
- Fate: Scrapped, 1966

General characteristics
- Class & type: Artemis-class attack cargo ship
- Type: S4–SE2–BE1
- Displacement: 4,087 long tons (4,153 t) light; 7,080 long tons (7,194 t) full
- Length: 426 ft (130 m)
- Beam: 58 ft (18 m)
- Draft: 15 ft 6 in (4.72 m)
- Speed: 16.5 knots (30.6 km/h; 19.0 mph)
- Complement: 303 officers and enlisted
- Armament: 1 × 5"/38 caliber gun mount; 4 × twin 40 mm gun mounts; 10 × 20 mm gun mounts

USS Polana (AKA-35) was an Artemis-class attack cargo ship in service with the United States Navy from 1945 to 1946. She was scrapped in 1966.

== History ==
Polana (AKA-35) wasnamed after the minor planet 142 Polana, which in turn was named after the city of Pola (now Pula, Croatia), from which it was discovered. She was laid down 11 December 1944 as MC hull 1896 by Walsh-Kaiser Co., Inc., Providence, R.I.; launched 17 January 1945; sponsored by Mrs. Felix Gygax; completed and accepted at the Boston Navy Yard; and commissioned 21 February 1945.

After shakedown along the Atlantic coast and in Chesapeake waters, Polana steamed for Newport, R.I. to assume duties as an Amphibious Force training ship. Operating between Newport and Norfolk, she trained several pre-commissioning details through the first week of May.

Standing out of Hampton Roads, Va. 10 May, Polana transited the Panama Canal and continued on to Pearl Harbor, arriving 31 May. Assigned to Commander, Amphibious Force, Pacific Fleet, she commenced a series of cargo runs that took her from Pearl Harbor 16 June en route Eniwetok, where she moored 24–25 June.

From this point Polana’s assignments entailed a series of inter-island cargo runs that included extensive steaming and long hours of cargo handling. Guam served as a base of operations from the end of June as she delivered cargo at Tinian 30 June and at Saipan 6–9 July. Through the summer she also called at New Caledonia, Espiritu Santo, and at various Philippine ports. She stood out of San Pedro Bay in convoy 1 September for Yokohama, Japan, arriving 8 September to offload occupation troops and supplies.

The fall found her assigned to "Magic Carpet" duty, and through the winter she continued cargo runs between the Philippines, Japan, Okinawa, and Tsingtao, China. She departed Guam 7 December and reached San Francisco 21 December. After the New Year she sailed to the East Coast, arriving Norfolk 7 February 1946. She decommissioned 21 March at Portsmouth, Va., was struck from the Navy List 1 May and delivered to the Maritime Commission 26 June 1946 at Lee Hall, Va. She was sold for scrapping in 1966.
