= 343 Ostara =

Main-belt asteroid

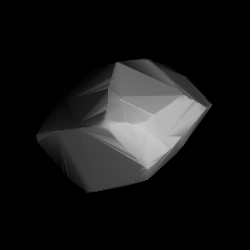
- Modelled shape of Ostara from its lightcurve

Discovery
- Discovered by: Max Wolf
- Discovery site: Heidelberg Obs.
- Discovery date: 15 November 1892

Designations
- Named after: Ēostre
- Alternative designations: 1892 N · A892 VA
- Minor planet category: Main belt

Orbital characteristics
- Epoch 31 July 2016 (JD 2457600.5)
- Uncertainty parameter 0
- Observation arc: 123.10 yr (44961 d)
- Aphelion: 2.96385 AU (443.386 Gm)
- Perihelion: 1.85989 AU (278.236 Gm)
- Semi-major axis: 2.41187 AU (360.811 Gm)
- Eccentricity: 0.22886
- Orbital period (sidereal): 3.75 yr (1368.1 d)
- Mean anomaly: 16.5913°
- Mean motion: 0° 15^{m} 47.275^{s} / day
- Inclination: 3.26504°
- Longitude of ascending node: 38.6320°
- Argument of perihelion: 9.62726°

Physical characteristics
- Mean diameter: 19.10±1.3 km
- Synodic rotation period: 109.87 h (4.578 d)
- Geometric albedo: 0.1151±0.017
- Absolute magnitude (H): 11.56

343 Ostara (prov. designation: A892 VA or 1892 N) is a background asteroid from the inner region of the asteroid belt. It was discovered by German astronomer Max Wolf at the Heidelberg Observatory on 15 November 1892.
