= 721 Tabora =

Main-belt asteroid

Discovery
- Discovered by: Franz Kaiser
- Discovery site: Heidelberg
- Discovery date: 18 October 1911

Designations
- Alternative designations: 1911 MZ

Orbital characteristics
- Epoch 31 July 2016 (JD 2457600.5)
- Uncertainty parameter 0
- Observation arc: 104.47 years (38,159 days)
- Aphelion: 3.9621 AU (592.72 Gm)
- Perihelion: 3.1388 AU (469.56 Gm)
- Semi-major axis: 3.5504 AU (531.13 Gm)
- Eccentricity: 0.11595
- Orbital period (sidereal): 6.69 yr (2,443.6 d)
- Mean anomaly: 218.961°
- Mean motion: 0° 8^{m} 50.388^{s} / day
- Inclination: 8.3229°
- Longitude of ascending node: 38.411°
- Argument of perihelion: 352.878°
- Earth MOID: 2.1434 AU (320.65 Gm)
- Jupiter MOID: 1.47765 AU (221.053 Gm)
- T_{Jupiter}: 3.089

Physical characteristics
- Mean diameter: 78 ± 5 km
- Synodic rotation period: 7.981234+0.000010 −0.000011 h
- Pole ecliptic longitude: 173°+4° −5° or 340°+6° −9°
- Pole ecliptic latitude: −49°+18° −20° or 34°+20° −26°
- Geometric albedo: 0.0604±0.004
- Absolute magnitude (H): 9.26

721 Tabora is a minor planet orbiting the Sun. Tabora was named at a conference in Hamburg, Germany in 1913. The name was chosen because the conference was held aboard the passenger cargo liner Tabora of the Deutsche Ost-Afrika Linie. The asteroid is orbiting at a distance of 3.55 AU from the Sun with a period of 6.69 years and an eccentricity (ovalness) of 0.12. The orbital plane for is inclined at an angle of 8.3° to the plane of the ecliptic It is a member of the Cybele group in the outer belt.

Photometric observations of this asteroid made during 2005 were used to produce a light curve showing a rotation period of 7.982±0.001 h with a brightness variation of 0.28 in magnitude. This is a low albedo D-type asteroid showing the characteristic featureless, reddish spectrum of that taxonomic class. It spans a girth of approximately 76 km.
