= Sidon (surname) =

Sidon is a surname. Notable people with the surname include:

- Andreas Sidon (born 1963), German professional boxer fighting in the heavyweight division
- Ephraim Sidon (born 1946), Israeli author, playwright and satirist, and writer of children's books
- Karol Sidon (born 1942), Czech rabbi, writer and playwright
- Shimon Sidon (1815–1891), Hungarian rabbi
- Simon Sidon or Szidon (1892–1941), Hungarian mathematician

== People known as "of Sidon" ==
- Abba Gorion of Sidon, a tanna who lived in the second century in Sidon
- Antipater of Sidon, Antipatros or Antipatros Sidonios in the Anthologies, a Greek poet in the second half of the 2nd century BC
- Boethus of Sidon (Peripatetic) (c. 75 – c. 10 BC), Peripatetic philosopher from Sidon
- Boethus of Sidon (Stoic), (2nd century BC), Stoic philosopher from Sidon
- Dorotheus of Sidon (c. 75 CE), Hellenistic astrologer who wrote a didactic poem on horoscopic astrology known in Greek as the Pentateuch
- Meges of Sidon (1st century BC), eminent surgeon born at Sidon
- Reginald of Sidon (1130s – 1202), Lord of Sidon and an important noble in the Kingdom of Jerusalem
- Zeno of Sidon (c. 150 – c. 75 BC), Epicurean philosopher from the Phoenician city of Sidon
