= 579 Sidonia =

Main-belt asteroid

Discovery
- Discovered by: A. Kopff
- Discovery site: Heidelberg
- Discovery date: 3 November 1905

Designations
- Pronunciation: /saɪˈdoʊniə/
- Alternative designations: 1905 SD

Orbital characteristics
- Epoch 31 July 2016 (JD 2457600.5)
- Uncertainty parameter 0
- Observation arc: 109.22 yr (39891 d)
- Aphelion: 3.2535 AU (486.72 Gm)
- Perihelion: 2.7680 AU (414.09 Gm)
- Semi-major axis: 3.0107 AU (450.39 Gm)
- Eccentricity: 0.080631
- Orbital period (sidereal): 5.22 yr (1908.1 d)
- Mean anomaly: 161.100°
- Mean motion: 0° 11^{m} 19.212^{s} / day
- Inclination: 11.009°
- Longitude of ascending node: 82.737°
- Argument of perihelion: 228.785°

Physical characteristics
- Mean radius: 42.785±1.1 km
- Mass: (6.6±3.3)×10^{17} kg (Note: Calculated from its standard gravitational parameter GM = 0.044±0.022 km^{3}/s^{2}.)
- Mean density: 2.01 g/cm^{3} (Note: Assuming a diameter of 85.6 km.)
- Synodic rotation period: 16.286 h (0.6786 d)
- Geometric albedo: 0.1748±0.009
- Absolute magnitude (H): 8.07; 7.85

579 Sidonia is a minor planet orbiting the Sun that was discovered by the German astronomer August Kopff on 3 November 1905. It was named after a character in Christoph Willibald Gluck's opera Armide. The name may have been inspired by the asteroid's provisional designation 1905 SD.

This is a member of the dynamic Eos family of asteroids that most likely formed as the result of a collisional breakup of a parent body.
