= 419 Aurelia =

Main-belt asteroid

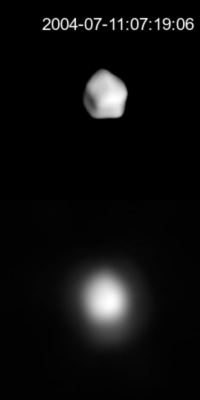
- Lightcurve-base 3D-model of Aurelia on the top with an image of the asteroid on the bottom.

Discovery
- Discovered by: Max Wolf
- Discovery date: 7 September 1896

Designations
- Pronunciation: /ɒˈriːliə/
- Alternative designations: 1896 CW
- Minor planet category: Main belt

Orbital characteristics
- Epoch 31 July 2016 (JD 2457600.5)
- Uncertainty parameter 0
- Observation arc: 117.23 yr (42819 d)
- Aphelion: 3.2498 AU (486.16 Gm)
- Perihelion: 1.94613 AU (291.137 Gm)
- Semi-major axis: 2.59798 AU (388.652 Gm)
- Eccentricity: 0.25091
- Orbital period (sidereal): 4.19 yr (1529.5 d)
- Mean anomaly: 297.81°
- Mean motion: 0° 14^{m} 7.332^{s} / day
- Inclination: 3.9247°
- Longitude of ascending node: 229.14°
- Argument of perihelion: 44.326°

Physical characteristics
- Mean diameter: 120/125 ± 3 km (AO)
- Mass: (1.39±0.10)×10^{18} kg (Note: Calculated from its standard gravitational parameter GM = 0.093±0.007 km^{3}/s^{2}.)
- Mean density: 1.53±0.17 g/cm^{3} (Note: Assuming a diameter of 120 ± 3 km.)
- Synodic rotation period: 16.7809 h (0.69920 d)
- Pole ecliptic longitude: 354° ± 5°/173° ± 3°
- Pole ecliptic latitude: 43° ± 4°/35° ± 3°
- Geometric albedo: 0.034±0.008
- Spectral type: F
- Absolute magnitude (H): 8.59

419 Aurelia is a main-belt asteroid that was discovered by German astronomer Max Wolf on September 7, 1896, in Heidelberg. It is classified as an F-type asteroid.

Photometric observations of this asteroid made during 2008 at the Organ Mesa Observatory in Las Cruces, New Mexico gave a "somewhat irregular" light curve with a period of 16.784 ± 0.001 hours and a brightness variation of 0.07 ± 0.01 in magnitude. When allowing for varying aspect angles and changes in mean motion, this result is consistent with past studies.
