= 881 Athene =

Stony background asteroid

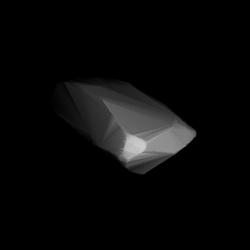
- Modelled shape of Athene from its lightcurve

Discovery
- Discovered by: M. F. Wolf
- Discovery site: Heidelberg Obs.
- Discovery date: 22 July 1917

Designations
- Pronunciation: /əˈθiːniː/
- Named after: Goddess Athena (Greek mythology)
- Alternative designations: A917 OD · 1917 CL
- Minor planet category: main-belt · (middle); background
- Adjectives: Athenian /əˈθiːniən/

Orbital characteristics
- Epoch 31 May 2020 (JD 2459000.5)
- Uncertainty parameter 0
- Observation arc: 102.53 yr (37,449 d)
- Aphelion: 3.1510 AU
- Perihelion: 2.0764 AU
- Semi-major axis: 2.6137 AU
- Eccentricity: 0.2056
- Orbital period (sidereal): 4.23 yr (1,543 d)
- Mean anomaly: 121.30°
- Mean motion: 0° 13^{m} 59.52^{s} / day
- Inclination: 14.191°
- Longitude of ascending node: 277.03°
- Argument of perihelion: 41.313°

Physical characteristics
- Mean diameter: 12.04±0.28 km; 12.153±0.101 km
- Pole ecliptic latitude: (123.0°, −58.0°) (λ_{1}/β_{1}); (337.0°, −47.0°) (λ_{2}/β_{2})
- Geometric albedo: 0.237±0.039; 0.237±0.012
- Spectral type: S (S3OS2-TH); Sl (S3OS2-BB); L (SDSS-MOC)
- Absolute magnitude (H): 11.8

881 Athene (prov. designation: A917 OD or 1917 CL) is a stony background asteroid from the central region of the asteroid belt. It was discovered on 22 July 1917, by astronomer Max Wolf at the Heidelberg-Königstuhl State Observatory in southwest Germany. The likely elongated S/L-type asteroid has a rotation period of 13.9 hours and measures approximately 12 kilometers (7.5 miles) in diameter. It was named after Athena, the goddess of wisdom in Greek mythology. According to astrophysicist Rayme Traub at JHU APL NASA, Europa Clipper will make a pass by Athene in 2027 after passing Earth on its way to Jupiter. Europa Clipper will test its sensors on Athene in preparation for Europa in 2030.

== Orbit and classification ==
Located in or near the orbital region of the Eunomia family, Athene is a non-family asteroid of the main belt's background population when applying the hierarchical clustering method to its proper orbital elements. It orbits the Sun in the central asteroid belt at a distance of 2.1–3.2 AU once every 4 years and 3 months (1,543 days; semi-major axis of 2.61 AU). Its orbit has an eccentricity of 0.21 and an inclination of 14° with respect to the ecliptic. The body's observation arc begins at Uccle Observatory on 8 August 1934, almost 17 years after its official discovery observation at Heidelberg on 22 July 1917.

== Naming ==
This minor planet was named after Athena or "Pallas Athene", the goddess of wisdom in Greek mythology, also known as Minerva in Roman mythology. The naming was mentioned in The Names of the Minor Planets by Paul Herget in 1955 (H 86). Asteroids 93 Minerva and 2 Pallas are both named after the goddess as well.

== Physical characteristics ==
In the Tholen-like taxonomy of the Small Solar System Objects Spectroscopic Survey (S3OS2), Athene is a common, stony S-type asteroid, while in the SDSS-based taxonomy, it is an L-type asteroid. In the SMASS-like taxonomic variant of the S3OS2, Athene is an Sl-subtype that transitions between the S-and L-type.

=== Rotation period ===
In August 2006, a rotational lightcurve of Athene was obtained from photometric observations by Roberto Crippa and Federico Manzini at the Sozzago Astronomical Station (A12), Italy, and by Jean-Gabriel Bosch at the Collonges Observatory (178), France. Lightcurve analysis gave a rotation period of 13.895±0.003 hours with a high brightness variation of 0.53±0.01 magnitude, indicative of a non-spherical, elongated shape (U=3−). In September 2010, French amateur astronomer René Roy measured a similar period of 13.881±0.001 hours and an amplitude of 0.39±0.02 (U=2+).

=== Poles ===
Two lightcurves, published in 2016, using modeled photometric data from the Lowell Photometric Database (LPD) and other sources, gave a concurring sidereal period of 13.89449±0.00001 and 13.8943±0.0005 hours, respectively. Each modeled lightcurve also determined two spin axes of (123.0°, −58.0°) and (337.0°, −47.0°), as well as (115.0°, −77.0°) and (338.0°, −43.0°) in ecliptic coordinates (λ, β).

=== Diameter and albedo ===
According to the surveys carried out by the Japanese Akari satellite and the NEOWISE mission of NASA's Wide-field Infrared Survey Explorer (WISE), Athene measures (12.04±0.28) and (12.153±0.101) kilometers in diameter and its surface has an albedo of (0.237±0.012) and (0.237±0.039), respectively. The Collaborative Asteroid Lightcurve Link assumes a standard Eunomian albedo of 0.21 and calculates a diameter of 12.66 kilometers based on an absolute magnitude of 11.8. Alternative mean diameter measurements published by the WISE team include (12.152±2.176 km), (12.369±0.285 km) and (12.671±0.077 km) with corresponding albedos of (0.278±0.128), (0.241±0.044) and (0.2111±0.0234).

== See also ==
- 2 Pallas, another asteroid named after Athena
