= 105 Artemis =

Main-belt asteroid

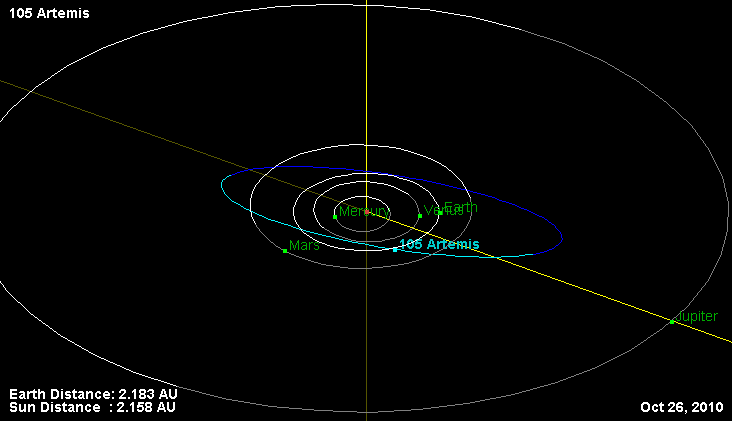
- Orbital diagram

Discovery
- Discovered by: James Craig Watson
- Discovery date: 16 September 1868

Designations
- Pronunciation: /ˈɑːrtəməs/
- Named after: Artemis
- Alternative designations: A868 SA
- Minor planet category: Main belt
- Adjectives: Artemidean / Artemidian /ɑːrtəˈmɪdiən/ Artemisian /ɑːrtəˈmɪziən/

Orbital characteristics
- Epoch 31 July 2016 (JD 2457600.5)
- Uncertainty parameter 0
- Observation arc: 100.79 yr (36812 d)
- Aphelion: 2.7952 AU (418.16 Gm)
- Perihelion: 1.95119 AU (291.894 Gm)
- Semi-major axis: 2.37319 AU (355.024 Gm)
- Eccentricity: 0.17782
- Orbital period (sidereal): 3.66 yr (1335.4 d)
- Average orbital speed: 19.18 km/s
- Mean anomaly: 256.90°
- Mean motion: 0° 16^{m} 10.524^{s} / day
- Inclination: 21.444°
- Longitude of ascending node: 188.264°
- Argument of perihelion: 57.077°
- Earth MOID: 1.00955 AU (151.027 Gm)
- Jupiter MOID: 2.31243 AU (345.935 Gm)
- T_{Jupiter}: 3.430

Physical characteristics
- Mean diameter: 122.44±2.70 km (composite estimate); 119.08±2.8 km
- Mass: (1.43 ± 0.414) × 10^{18} kg (composite estimate)
- Mean density: 1.49 ± 0.44 g/cm^{3}
- Equatorial surface gravity: 0.0333 m/s²
- Equatorial escape velocity: 0.0630 km/s
- Synodic rotation period: 37.15506 h (1.548128 d); 37.15 h
- Geometric albedo: 0.0465±0.002
- Temperature: ~180 K
- Spectral type: C (Tholen); Ch (Bus)
- Absolute magnitude (H): 8.57

105 Artemis is a main-belt asteroid that was discovered by J. C. Watson on September 16, 1868, at Ann Arbor, Michigan. It was named after Artemis, the goddess of the hunt, Moon, and crossways in Greek mythology.

It is a C-type asteroid, meaning that it is very dark and composed of carbonaceous material. Although it shares a similar orbit to the Phocaea family of S-type asteroids, its classification means 105 Artemis is not a member. The spectra of the asteroid displays evidence of aqueous alteration.

In 1988, this object was detected with radar from the Arecibo Observatory at a distance of 1.07 AU. The measured radar cross-section was 1,800 km^{2}. Photometric measurement of this asteroid made in 2010 at Organ Mesa Observatory in Las Cruces, New Mexico, produced an irregular light curve with a period of 37.150 ± 0.001 hours. During each rotation, the brightness varies by 0.16 ± 0.01 in magnitude.

Based upon radar data, the estimated near surface solid density of the asteroid is 3.0^{+0.9}_{−0.8} g cm^{−3}. Refined observations by the Arecibo Observatory, reported in 2006, showed a complex surface with varying albedo. Analysis of the spectra of 105 Artemis shows the presence of hydrated minerals at some rotation angles, but not at others.

An occultation of the star HD 197999 was observed in 1982, which gave an estimated chord length of 110 km. Between 1981 and 2021, 105 Artemis has been observed to occult 23 stars.
