= Whitfield County =

Whitfield County may refer to:

- Whitfield County, Georgia
- USS Whitfield County (LST-1169), a 1954 United States Navy landing ship tank
- Whitfield County School District, Georgia

== See also ==
- USS Whitfield, named after Whitfield County
- Whitfield (disambiguation)
