= Andromeda-class attack cargo ship =

American naval vessel class

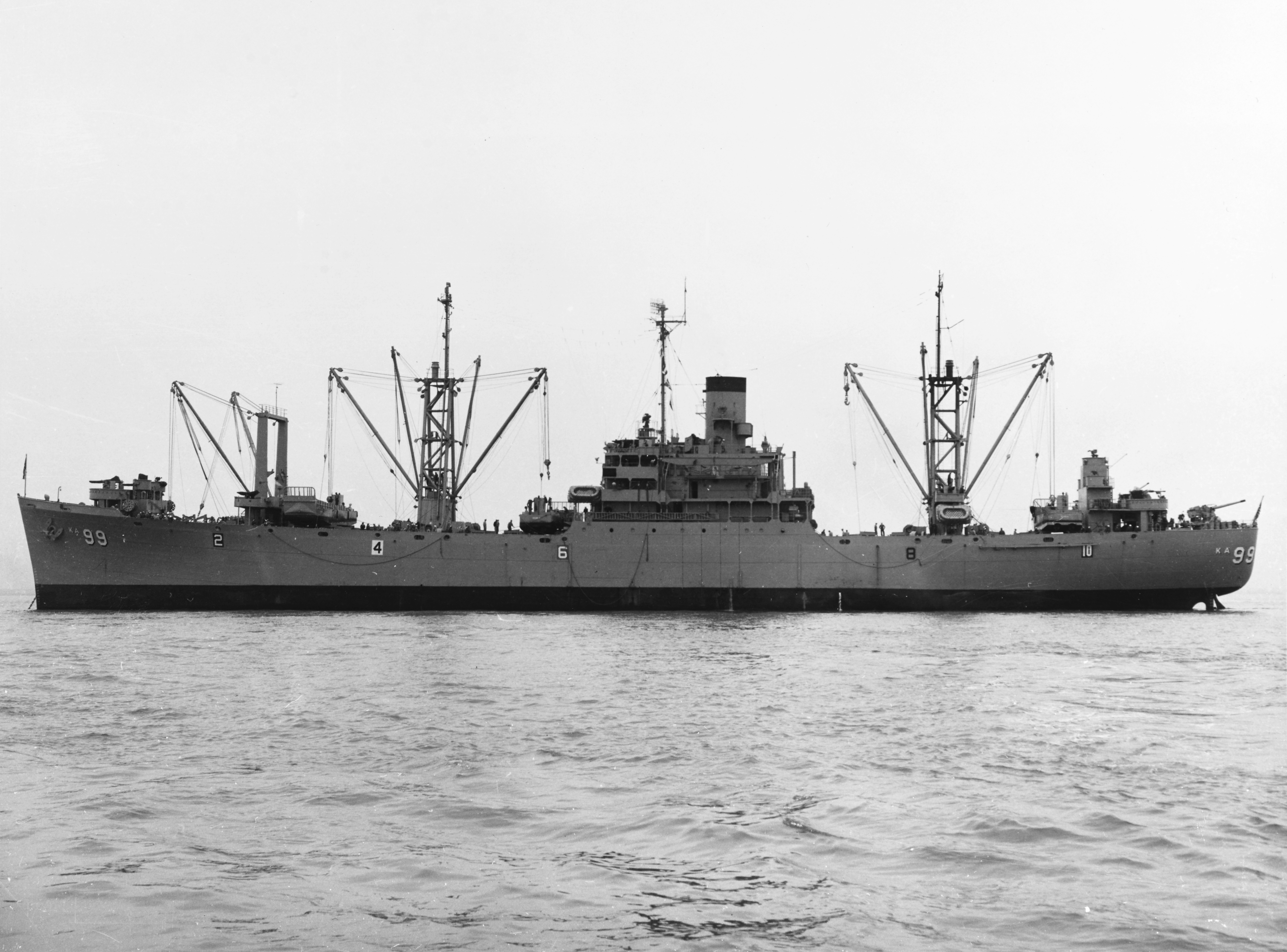
- USS Rolette – a typical Andromeda-class AKA

Class overview
- Builders: Federal Shipbuilding and Drydock Company; Moore Dry Dock Company
- Succeeded by: Tolland-class attack cargo ship
- Built: 1943–1945
- Completed: 30

General characteristics
- Class & type: Type C2 ship
- Displacement: 6,761 tons empty
- Length: 459 ft 2 in (140 m)
- Beam: 63 ft (19 m)
- Draft: 26 ft 4 in (8 m)
- Speed: 16.5 kn (31 km/h)
- Complement: 247 (varies)
- Armament: 1 × 5-inch/38-caliber dual-purpose gun mount; 4 × twin 40 mm gun mounts; 16 × 20 mm guns gun mounts

The Andromeda-class attack cargo ships were a class of Type C2 ship-based amphibious cargo ship built by Federal Shipbuilding & Drydock Co. in Kearny, New Jersey, and Moore Dry Dock Co., in Oakland, California, during World War II. Like all attack cargo ships, they were designed to carry combat loaded military cargo and landing craft, and to use the latter to land weapons, supplies, and troops on enemy shores during amphibious operations.

All these ships were built on the same standard hull design, but there were some differences from ship to ship. The armament varied, as did that of the other ships of the day. During 1944–1945, the 5"/38 dual-purpose gun was recognized as the best weapon for the dual role of antiaircraft and naval gunfire support, and the Bofors 40 mm automatic gun was seen as the best antiaircraft gun. The older 20 mm and .50 caliber guns had been recognized to be of limited value, and were being phased out, though they appeared on some of these ships. The 20 mm guns were later removed from all of them, but it is not clear just when this happened.

The complement varied as well, but the Dictionary of American Naval Fighting Ships figures sometimes seem to confuse ship's company with embarked troops in determining a ship's complement.

== Ships ==
List of Andromeda-class ships
Name	Hull no.	MC hull	Builder	Laid down	Launched	Comm.	Decomm.	Fate
Andromeda	AKA-15	199	FSBD	22 Sep 1942	22 Dec 1942	2 Apr 1943	1 May 1956	stricken 1 July 1960; sold in 1971
Aquarius	AKA-16	205	FSBD	28 Apr 1943	23 Jul 1943	21 Aug 1943	23 May 1946	stricken 13 Nov 1946; sold 12 Feb 1947
Centaurus	AKA-17		FSBD		3 Sep 1943	21 Oct 1943	30 Apr 1946	returned to the Maritime Commission 11 Sep 1946; transferred to United States Lines 24 Feb 1947
Cepheus	AKA-18		FSBD		23 Oct 1943	16 Dec 1943	22 May 1946	returned to the Maritime Commission 1946
Thuban	AKA-19	203	FSBD	2 Feb 1943	26 Apr 1943	10 Jun 1943	Oct 1967	reclassified as amphibious cargo ship, redesignated LKA-19 1 Jan 1969; remained in National Defense Reserve Fleet into Oct 1979
Virgo	AKA-20	204	FSBD	9 Mar 1943	4 Jun 1943	16 Jul 1943	1 Jul 1961	redesignated AE-30 1 Nov 1965; stricken 18 Feb 1971; sold for scrapping 19 Nov 1973
Virgo	AKA-20	204	FSBD	9 Mar 1943	4 Jun 1943	19 Aug 1966	18 Feb 1971	redesignated AE-30 1 Nov 1965; stricken 18 Feb 1971; sold for scrapping 19 Nov 1973
Achernar	AKA-53		FSBD	6 Sep 1943	3 Dec 1943	31 Jan 1944	1 Jul 1963	transferred to Spanish Navy as Castilla (TA-21) 2 Feb 1965; scrapped in 1982
Achernar	AKA-53		FSBD	6 Sep 1943	3 Dec 1943	1 Sep 1961	1 Jul 1963	transferred to Spanish Navy as Castilla (TA-21) 2 Feb 1965; scrapped in 1982
Algol (ex-James Barnes)	AKA-54	1153	MDD	10 Dec 1942	17 Feb 1943	27 Nov 1943	3 Dec 1943	reclassified LKA-54 1 Jan 1969; stricken 1 Jan 1977; sunk as artificial reef 18 Nov 1991
Algol (ex-James Barnes)	AKA-54	1153	MDD	10 Dec 1942	17 Feb 1943	21 Jul 1944	2 Jan 1958	reclassified LKA-54 1 Jan 1969; stricken 1 Jan 1977; sunk as artificial reef 18 Nov 1991
Algol (ex-James Barnes)	AKA-54	1153	MDD	10 Dec 1942	17 Feb 1943	17 Nov 1961	23 Jul 1970	reclassified LKA-54 1 Jan 1969; stricken 1 Jan 1977; sunk as artificial reef 18 Nov 1991
Alshain	AKA-55	209	FSBD	29 Oct 1943	26 Jan 1944	1 Apr 1944	14 Jan 1956	reclassified USNS Alshain (T-AKA-55) 1 Oct 1949; stricken 1 Jul 1960; sold for scrap 16 Feb 1978
Arneb (ex-Mischief)	AKA-56	1159	MDD		6 Jul 1943	22 Apr 1944	16 Mar 1948	reclassified LKA-56 1 Jan 1969; stricken 13 Aug 1971; sold for scrap 1 Mar 1973
Arneb (ex-Mischief)	AKA-56	1159	MDD		6 Jul 1943	19 Mar 1949	12 Aug 1971	reclassified LKA-56 1 Jan 1969; stricken 13 Aug 1971; sold for scrap 1 Mar 1973
Capricornus (ex-Spitfire)	AKA-57		MDD		14 Aug 1943	31 May 1944	30 Mar 1948	reclassified LKA-57 1 Jan 1969; stricken 1 Jan 1977; scrapped 1985
Capricornus (ex-Spitfire)	AKA-57		MDD		14 Aug 1943	12 Oct 1950	10 Feb 1970	reclassified LKA-57 1 Jan 1969; stricken 1 Jan 1977; scrapped 1985
Chara	AKA-58		FSBD		15 Mar 1944	14 Jun 1944	21 Apr 1959	reclassified AE-31, 25 Jun 1966; stricken 10 Mar 1972; sold for scrap 12 Nov 1972
Chara	AKA-58		FSBD		15 Mar 1944	25 Jun 1966	Mar 1972	reclassified AE-31, 25 Jun 1966; stricken 10 Mar 1972; sold for scrap 12 Nov 1972
Diphda	AKA-59		FSBD		11 May 1944	8 Jul 1944	11 May 1956	placed in reserve 11 May 1956
Leo	AKA-60		FSBD	17 Mar 1944	29 Jul 1944	30 Aug 1944	11 Feb 1955	stricken 1 Jul 1960; sold for scrap 19 Jul 1976
Muliphen	AKA-61		FSBD	13 May 1944	26 Aug 1944	23 Oct 1944	28 Aug 1970	reclassified LKA-61 1 Jan 1969; stricken 1 Jan 1977; sunk as an artificial reef off Fort Pierce, Florida, 21 Jan 1989
Sheliak	AKA-62	214	FSBD	19 Jun 1944	17 Oct 1944	1 Dec 1944	10 May 1946	stricken 21 May 1946; sold into commercial service 1948; scrapped 1969
Theenim	AKA-63	215	FSBD	18 Jul 1944	31 Oct 1944	22 Dec 1944	10 May 1946	stricken 12 May 1946; scrapped 1970
Uvalde	AKA-88	1188	MDD	27 Mar 1944	20 May 1944	18 Aug 1944	1957	stricken 1 Jul 1960, reinstated 1 Sep 1961; stricken 1 Dec 1968; sold for scrap 1969
Uvalde	AKA-88	1188	MDD	27 Mar 1944	20 May 1944	18 Nov 1961	1 Dec 1968	stricken 1 Jul 1960, reinstated 1 Sep 1961; stricken 1 Dec 1968; sold for scrap 1969
Warrick	AKA-89	1189	MDD	7 Apr 1944	29 May 1944	30 Aug 1944	3 Dec 1957	stricken 1 Jul 1961; sunk as a target ship 28 May 1971
Whiteside	AKA-90	1190	MDD	22 Apr 1944	12 Jun 1944	11 Sep 1944	30 Jan 1958	stricken 1 Jul 1961; sunk as a target ship 1971
Whitley	AKA-91	1191	MDD	2 May 1944	22 Jun 1944	21 Sep 1944	16 Aug 1955	stricken 1 Jul 1960, reinstated 1 Dec 1961; loaned to Italy Feb 1962, renamed Etna (A 5328); stricken and sold to Italy 1 May 1973; scrapped Jul 1979
Wyandot	AKA-92	1192	MDD	6 May 1944	28 Jun 1944	30 Sep 1944	10 Jul 1959	reclassified T-AKA-92 Mar 1963; sold for scrap 5 Nov 1987
Wyandot	AKA-92	1192	MDD	6 May 1944	28 Jun 1944	Nov 1961	31 Oct 1975	reclassified T-AKA-92 Mar 1963; sold for scrap 5 Nov 1987
Yancey	AKA-93	1193	MDD	22 May 1944	8 Jul 1944	11 Oct 1944	Mar 1958	redesignated as LKA-93 1 Jan 1969; stricken 1 Jan 1977; sunk as artificial reef off Morehead City, NC, 1990
Yancey	AKA-93	1193	MDD	22 May 1944	8 Jul 1944	17 Nov 1961	20 Jan 1971	redesignated as LKA-93 1 Jan 1969; stricken 1 Jan 1977; sunk as artificial reef off Morehead City, NC, 1990
Winston	AKA-94	216	FSBD	10 Jul 1944	30 Nov 1944	19 Jan 1945	1 Feb 1957	reclassified LKA-94 1 Jan 1969; stricken 1 Sep 1976; sold for scrap 15 Nov 1979
Winston	AKA-94	216	FSBD	10 Jul 1944	30 Nov 1944	24 Nov 1961	Nov 1969	reclassified LKA-94 1 Jan 1969; stricken 1 Sep 1976; sold for scrap 15 Nov 1979
Marquette	AKA-95		FSBD		29 Apr 1945	20 Jun 1945	19 Jul 1955	turned over to the Maritime Commission, placed in National Defense Reserve Fleet 9 Jan 1960; scrapped 1972
Mathews	AKA-96		FSBD	15 Sep 1944	22 Dec 1944	15 Mar 1945	4 Apr 1947	stricken 1 Nov 1968; sold for scrap 1969
Mathews	AKA-96		FSBD	15 Sep 1944	22 Dec 1944	16 Feb 1952	31 Oct 1968	stricken 1 Nov 1968; sold for scrap 1969
Merrick	AKA-97	219	FSBD	19 Oct 1944	28 Jan 1945	31 Mar 1945	26 Jun 1946	reclassified LKA–97 1 Jan 1969; stricken 1 Sep 1976; withdrawn from reserve, traded to States Marine Lines 19 Dec 1979; scrapped 13 Mar 1980
Merrick	AKA-97	219	FSBD	19 Oct 1944	28 Jan 1945	19 Jan 1952	17 Sep 1969	reclassified LKA–97 1 Jan 1969; stricken 1 Sep 1976; withdrawn from reserve, traded to States Marine Lines 19 Dec 1979; scrapped 13 Mar 1980
Montague	AKA-98		FSBD		12 Feb 1945	12 Apr 1945	22 Nov 1955	sold for scrapping 12 Mar 1971
Rolette	AKA-99		FSBD	2 Dec 1944	11 Mar 1945	27 Apr 1945	late 1945	stricken 23 Apr 1947, reinstated 13 Aug 1951; stricken 1 Jul 1960; scrapped 1978
Rolette	AKA-99		FSBD	2 Dec 1944	11 Mar 1945	23 Feb 1952	1 May 1956	stricken 23 Apr 1947, reinstated 13 Aug 1951; stricken 1 Jul 1960; scrapped 1978
Oglethorpe	AKA-100		FSBD	26 Dec 1944	15 Apr 1945	6 Jun 1945	1968	stricken 1 Nov 1968
Sedgwick	AKA-110			—N/a	—N/a	—N/a	—N/a	canceled before keel laid 27 Aug 1945
Whitfield	AKA-111	2898	FSBD	—N/a	—N/a	—N/a	—N/a	canceled before keel laid 27 Aug 1945

== See also ==
- Arcturus-class attack cargo ship
- Artemis-class attack cargo ship
- Charleston-class amphibious cargo ship
- Tolland-class attack cargo ship
- List of United States Navy amphibious warfare ships
- List of ship classes of World War II
