= USS Leo =

Cargo ship of the United States Navy

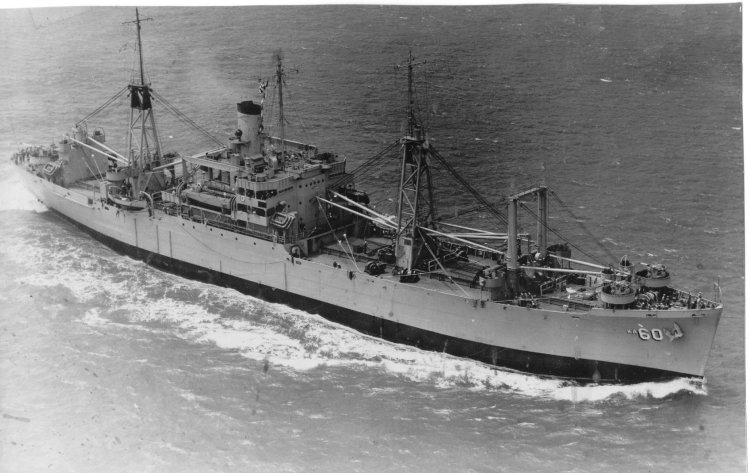

History

United States
- Name: USS Leo
- Namesake: The constellation Leo
- Builder: Federal Shipbuilding and Drydock Company, Kearny, New Jersey
- Laid down: 17 March 1944
- Launched: 29 July 1944
- Acquired: 29 August 1944
- Commissioned: 30 August 1944
- Decommissioned: 11 February 1955
- Stricken: 1 July 1960
- Honours and awards: 2 battle stars (World War II); 5 battle stars (Korea)
- Fate: Sold for scrap, 19 July 1976

General characteristics
- Class & type: Andromeda-class attack cargo ship
- Displacement: 6,556 long tons (6,661 t)
- Length: 459 ft 3 in (139.98 m)
- Beam: 63 ft (19 m)
- Draft: 25 ft 9 in (7.85 m)
- Speed: 16.4 knots (30.4 km/h; 18.9 mph)
- Complement: 404
- Armament: 1 × 5"/38 caliber gun mount; 4 × twin 40 mm gun mounts

USS Leo (AKA-60), an Andromeda-class attack cargo ship, was named for the constellation Leo. She is the only ship of the United States Navy to hold this name. USS Leo served as a commissioned ship for ten years and five months.

Leo (AKA-60) was laid down 17 March 1944 by Federal Shipbuilding and Drydock Company in Kearny, New Jersey, under Maritime Commission contract; launched on 29 July 1944, sponsored by Mrs. Ogden L. Mills, wife of the former Secretary of the Treasury; acquired by the Navy on 29 August 1944; and commissioned on 30 August 1944.

== Service history ==
=== World War II, 1944–1945 ===
After shakedown in Chesapeake Bay, the new attack cargo ship departed Norfolk, Virginia, for Hawaii on 13 October 1944, arriving at Pearl Harbor on 4 November. After a month of training off Maui, Hawaii, Leo steamed for Port Hueneme, California, arrived on 12 December, loaded cargo, and returned to Pearl Harbor on Christmas Eve.

After a month of intensive amphibious training, Leo steamed on 27 January 1945 for the assault on Iwo Jima with Amphibious TF 51 under Vice Admiral Richmond Kelly Turner. After brief calls at Eniwetok and Saipan, the ship arrived off the beaches of Iwo early morning, D-Day, 19 February. Debarking her troops the first hour, Leo then offloaded her high-priority cargo of trucks, fresh water, and ammunition into boats alongside. For the next nine days, the ship evacuated casualties and continued sending crucial war material ashore.

Steaming to the Marianas from Kwajalein, the ship prepared for the Okinawa landing. She departed Saipan on 27 March with Rear Admiral Wright's Demonstration Force for simulated landings on the southeastern beaches of Okinawa. Arriving at dawn on 1 April, the demonstration group received more attention from Japanese aircraft than did the actual landing group.

About 0550 on 1 April a Japanese kamikaze crashed into Hinsdale (APA-120), killing 24 and wounding 21. Completing her mission, Leo sent all her LCVPs to Hinsdale to pick up survivors, after which she retired for night steaming. The next three days Leo moved in and out from the southeast beaches as a decoy, drawing fire from the shore. She was detached from Admiral Wright's group on 4 April and steamed for transport area "Baker" and an actual landing off the northern beaches of Okinawa. Arriving the next day, she transferred Hinsdale survivors to a hospital ship and commenced offloading cargo.

Gunfire from the ship's starboard 40 mm mount destroyed a low-flying Japanese aircraft as it swooped down on the formation the afternoon of 6 April. Despite constant air raids, Leo offloaded all cargo by 14 April and steamed that afternoon for Ulithi, towing Hinsdale. They arrived on 23 April. She departed for Saipan on 25 April and through the rest of the war transported cargo between the Marianas and the Solomons. She completed two voyages from Saipan via Guam to Guadalcanal and Tulagi.

Departing Guam on 26 August, she steamed for Manila, arrived on 1 September, and loaded troops and equipment of the 43rd Division, 8th Army, designated for occupation duty in Japan. Arriving on 15 September off Yokosuka, Leo debarked the Army troops, loaded troops and equipment of the 6th Marine Division, rode out a typhoon until the 18th, and departed next day for Tsingtao, China. She arrived Tsingtao, which was headquarters for U.S. naval forces in the western Pacific after World War II, and had put the marines ashore by 18 October.

=== Inter-war period, 1945–1950 ===
Leo steamed for Manila and arrived on 23 October. After a fast cargo run to Hai Phong, French Indochina, Leo departed the Orient on 10 November and arrived Puget Sound 15 days later. Until the outbreak of the Korean War, Leo operated with the Naval Transportation Service in the Pacific.

=== Korean War, 1950–1954 ===
After the North Koreans invaded South Korea Leo steamed from San Francisco for Sasebo, Japan, with ammunition for the 7th Fleet. She arrived Japan on 19 September 1950 and supplied ammunition to ships deploying to Korean waters. The AKA steamed for Korea on 9 November with ammunition, stores, and mail for the ships engaged in the siege of Wonsan. Departing on 14 November, she returned to Sasebo for ten days and then left for San Francisco on 19 December.

She was again underway for Sasebo on 9 January 1951, and she spent that year operating between Japan and Korea. She arrived Sasebo on 27 January, rearmed ships there, then steamed for Korea on 10 March and replenished ships at Pusan, Pohang, and Wonsan.

Because of the buildup of heavy combatants off Korea and the logistical demands attendant to keeping them on the line, Leo operated between Sasebo and various rendezvous points in the Sea of Japan for the next nine months. Logistical problems diminished as Leo and her sister ships practiced night underway replenishment techniques. By 25 January 1952, when Leo departed Sasebo for San Francisco, the logistics team was able to replenish a fast carrier task force in only nine hours.

Upon arrival San Francisco on 9 February, Leo underwent overhaul and then steamed to Alaska on a cargo run during July and August. Between 7 October and 8 December she carried cargo from Oakland to Eniwetok. Leo also served as a transport for "Operation Ivy", a series of American nuclear tests conducted at Eniwetak, Kwajalein, and Bikini Atoll in November 1952. As a unit of the Military Sea Transportation Service (MSTS) the ship made three more voyages to the Eastern Asian coast plus another run to Alaska during the next two years.

=== Decommissioning and sale ===
Leo steamed from Oakland to Long Beach on 15 October 1954 where she was decommissioned on 11 February 1955 and transferred to the Pacific Reserve Fleet, San Diego. Subsequently transferred to the Maritime Administration, her name was struck from the Navy List on 1 July 1960 and she entered the National Defense Reserve Fleet at Suisun Bay, California. On 19 July 1976 Leo was sold for scrap.

== Awards ==
Leo received two battle stars for World War II service and five battle stars for Korean service.
