= USS Cepheus (AKA-18) =

Cargo ship of the United States Navy

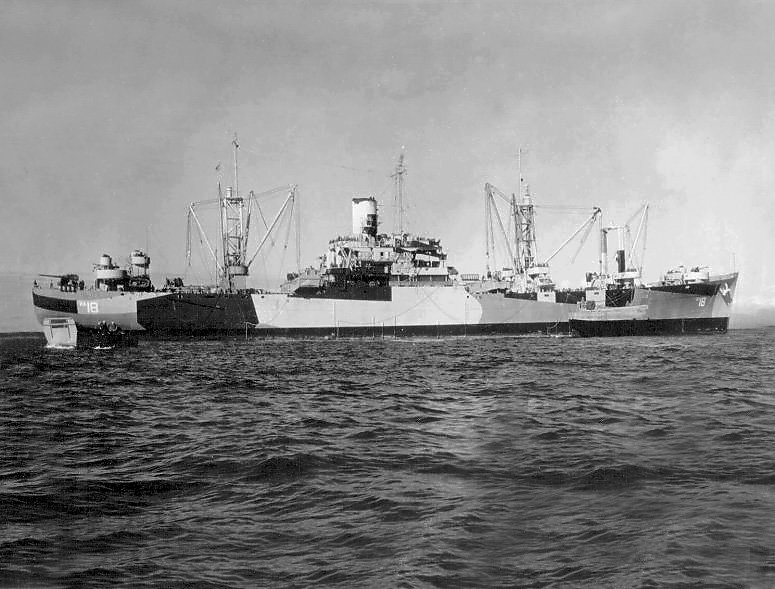

History

United States
- Name: USS Cepheus
- Namesake: The constellation Cepheus
- Builder: Federal Shipbuilding and Drydock Company, Kearny, New Jersey
- Launched: 23 October 1943
- Commissioned: 16 December 1943
- Decommissioned: 22 May 1946
- Honors and awards: 2 battle stars
- Fate: Sunk, 1968

General characteristics
- Class & type: Andromeda-class attack cargo ship
- Displacement: 6,556 long tons (6,661 t)
- Length: 459 ft 3 in (139.98 m)
- Beam: 63 ft (19 m)
- Draft: 26 ft (7.9 m)
- Speed: 16 knots (30 km/h; 18 mph)
- Complement: 404
- Armament: 1 × 5"/38 caliber dual purpose gun; 4 × 3 in (76 mm) guns

USS Cepheus (AKA-18) was an Andromeda-class attack cargo ship of the United States Navy that was manned by United States Coast Guard. She was in service from 1943 to 1946 and was subsequently sold into commercial service. She ran aground on a reef and became a constructive total loss in 1968.

== History ==
Cepheus (AKA-18) was named after the constellation Cepheus and was launched 23 October 1943 by Federal Shipbuilding and Drydock Co., Kearny, N.J., under a Maritime Commission contract; sponsored by Miss J. Sharpe; transferred to the Navy 15 December 1943; and commissioned the next day.

=== Mediterranean, 1944 ===
Cepheus put to sea from Staten Island 27 February 1944, bound in convoy for Liverpool. Although several submarine contacts were reported in the convoy, effective work by the escorts prevented any attacks, and the convoy arrived safely 9 March, with its cargo destined for the Normandy invasion. Joining her assigned division in Scottish waters, Cepheus sailed for Oran, where she arrived 6 April to report to the Eighth Amphibious Force. After training exercises along the Algerian coast, she loaded vehicles and troops for the passage to Naples, where she unloaded 19 June to 23 June. After training at Palermo and Salerno, she returned to Naples to offload combat vehicles, then cleared for Castellammare near Palermo to combat load for the invasion of Southern France.

Cepheus put to sea with the Camel Beach Attack Group 13 August 1944, and after a safe passage along a route designed to camouflage the convoy's destination, arrived off the beaches east of Saint-Raphaël just before dawn of 15 August. Her swift and competent unloading was a significant contribution to the successful passage over those beaches, and although the latter stages of unloading were accomplished under enemy air attack and through defensive smoke screen, Cepheus was empty before midnight, and moved out to await orders for her return to Naples, where she arrived on 18 August.

Between 23 August and 7 October 1944, Cepheus supported the rapid advance of forces ashore by four more voyages, two from Naples to the assault area, and two from Oran to Marseille, captured at the end of August after heavy naval bombardment of its defenses. Clearing Oran in convoy 25 October, she arrived at Norfolk, Va., 8 November. Here she prepared for duty in the Pacific, and on 18 December was underway for Pearl Harbor with cargo.

=== Pacific, 1945–1946 ===
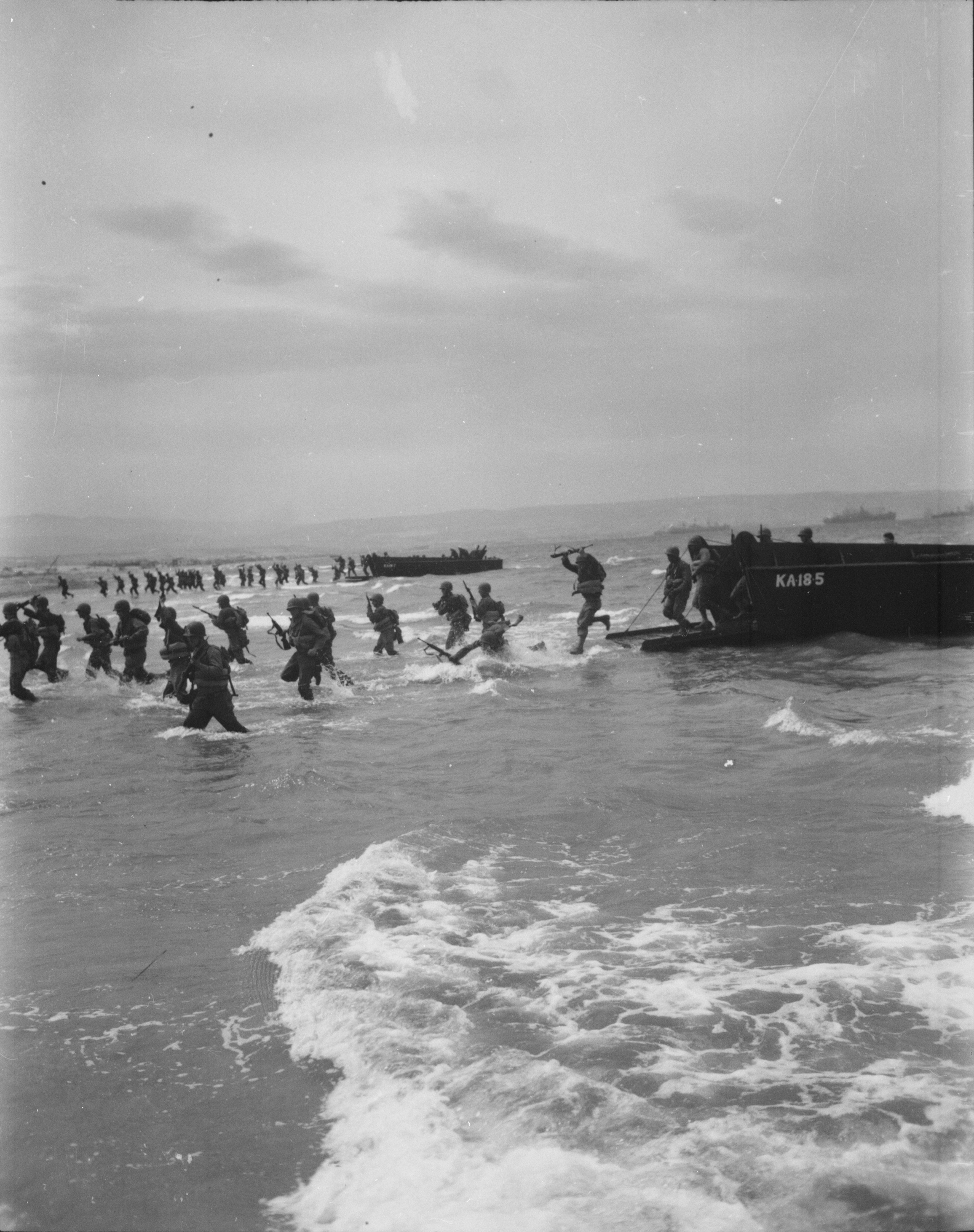
LCVPs from Cepheus bringing troops ashore during an exee in Algeria, April 1944

Arriving 10 January 1945, she joined in training exercises until 26 February, when she put to sea combat loaded for the Okinawa assault. Cepheus arrived in the transport area off Okinawa on 1 April 1945, and since her cargo was destined for use after the initial assault, sent her boats for use in unloading three other transports. She retired seaward for the night, and came under enemy air attack while returning to the island next morning. During that raid, she fired upon seven Japanese aircraft, and aided in downing three. She remained off the island, unloading and aiding other ships to unload, firing on enemy aircraft, until 16 April, when she cleared for replenishment at Saipan. Through May and June, she made a voyage from the Marianas to New Zealand to load cargo, and on 12 July, returned to Ulithi to join an Okinawa-bound convoy. At Hagushi anchorage, she underwent several air attacks, then moved to Kerama Retto to unload. She returned to New Caledonia and the New Hebrides to load construction equipment, which she carried to the Philippines, arriving at Lingayen 16 September. Four days later, she put to sea for the first of two voyages from the Philippines to Japan with occupation supplies, and on 28 October, she cleared for Portland, Oregon, from Hiro Wan. One more voyage was made from the west coast to the Far East, during which Cepheus carried cargo to Tianjin, China, before 15 February 1946, when the cargo transport left San Francisco astern, bound for New York City. Here she was decommissioned 22 May 1946, and returned to the Maritime Commission. MARAD records show she was given back to the Navy on 21 November 1946 and a "reconversion" contract was awarded to Maryland Drydock Company on 2 May 1947.

Cepheus received two battle stars for World War II service

=== Commercial service ===
Cepheus was sold into commercial service in 1947. In 1968, while being on a ballast voyage home from Sattahip, Thailand to Tampa, Florida, she ran aground at full speed on a reef off Honduras and was heavily damaged. Refloating proved to be impossible and she was finally abandoned as a constructive total loss in June 1968.
