= USS Whiteside =

Cargo ship of the United States Navy

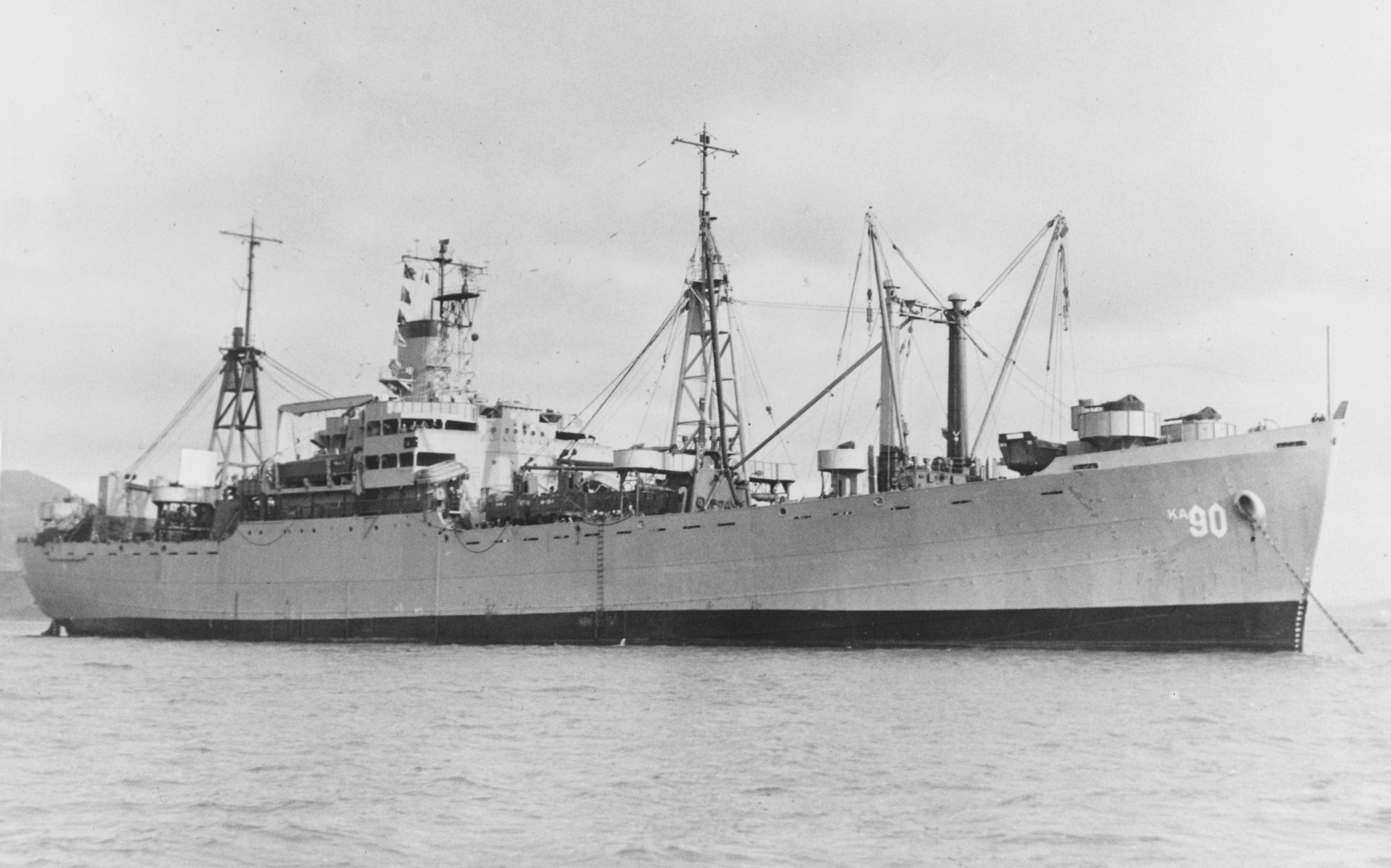
- USS Whiteside (AKA-90) anchored in San Francisco Bay, circa 1948

History

United States
- Name: USS Whiteside
- Namesake: Whiteside County, Illinois
- Builder: Moore Dry Dock Company, Oakland, California
- Laid down: 22 April 1944
- Launched: 12 June 1944
- Commissioned: 11 September 1944
- Decommissioned: 30 January 1958
- Stricken: 1 July 1961
- Honours and awards: 2 battle stars (World War II); 4 battle stars (Korea)
- Fate: Sunk as a target ship, 1971

General characteristics
- Class & type: Andromeda-class attack cargo ship
- Type: Type C2-S-B1
- Displacement: 13,910 long tons (14,133 t) full
- Length: 459 ft 2 in (139.95 m)
- Beam: 63 ft (19 m)
- Draft: 26 ft 4 in (8.03 m)
- Speed: 16.5 knots (30.6 km/h; 19.0 mph)
- Complement: 366 plus 78 troops
- Armament: 1 × 5"/38 caliber gun mount; 4 × twin 40 mm gun mounts; 16 × 20 mm gun mounts

USS Whiteside (AKA-90) was an Andromeda-class attack cargo ship named after Whiteside County, Illinois. She served as a commissioned ship for 13 years and 4 months.

Whiteside (AKA-90) was laid down on 22 April 1944 at Oakland, California, by the Moore Dry Dock Co. under a Maritime Commission contract (MC hull 1190), launched on 12 June 1944; sponsored by Mrs. Miriam C. Becker, delivered to the Navy on 11 September 1944, and commissioned that same day.

Between 11 September and 7 November, the attack cargo ship fitted out, conducted shakedown training, and underwent post-shakedown availability. She then loaded her first cargo at San Francisco and got underway on the 18th for Hawaii. The ship arrived at Oahu on 24 November and remained in Pearl Harbor until 6 December. On the latter day, she put to sea to participate in Army amphibious exercises at Maui. During a night retirement exercise on the night of 13/14 December, Bayfield (APA-33) rammed Whiteside on her starboard side near her number 2 hold. Whiteside returned to Pearl Harbor on 18 December to await repairs which began with drydocking on the 24th. She completed repairs on 12 January 1945 and resumed amphibious training with other ships of Transport Squadron (TransRon) 16 at Maui and Kahoolawe Islands. Those operations lasted until 18 January.

== World War II campaigns ==
The next day, the ship began loading cargo and passengers in preparation for the Iwo Jima assault. She departed Pearl Harbor on 27 January in convoy, bound for Iwo Jima. She stopped at Eniwetok and Saipan along the way and arrived off the objective early on the morning of 19 February. The attack cargo ship participated in the D-Day landings sending supplies and ammunition ashore to the troops struggling to wrest the island from a tenacious foe. She continued to fuel the offensive ashore until 5 March when — with 188 battle casualties embarked — she set a course for Guam in the Marianas, where the casualties disembarked. She then moved on to the New Hebrides.

She arrived at Espiritu Santo on 19 March and began loading cargo the next day for the Army's 27th Division in preparation for the Ryukyus campaign. Whiteside steamed out of Segond Channel on 25 March bound — via Ulithi — for Okinawa. The attack cargo ship arrived in the Ryukyus on 9 April, eight days after the landings. She remained there a week conducting unloading operations that were frequently interrupted by enemy air raids. During her stay off Okinawa, Whiteside engaged two of the hordes of attacking aircraft, but claimed no kills.

On 16 April, she departed Okinawa in company with the other ships of TransRon 16. After stops at Saipan and Guam, the ship arrived at Ulithi on 26 April. On 8 May, the ship stood out of the lagoon and set a course for the southern Solomons. She arrived off Lunga Point, Guadalcanal, on the 14th, loaded cargo, and got underway soon thereafter for Munda on New Georgia. From there, she headed for Finschhafen, New Guinea, where she discharged one Army cargo and took on another, bound for the Philippines.

Whiteside departed Finschhafen on 2 June and arrived at Leyte on the 6th. There, she discharged a portion of her cargo and then moved to Guiuan Harbor on Samar to unload a Navy cargo. On 12 June, she set sail for Subic Bay where she arrived two days later and unloaded her remaining cargo. She remained at Subic Bay until 25 June when she put to sea to participate in a month of amphibious exercises at Cebu with units of the Americal Division. She returned to Subic Bay on 26 July and began repairing her boilers, an operation which lasted until 7 August. On the latter day, she returned to sea for more amphibious training, this time at Luzon with units of the 1st Cavalry Division.

Those exercises ended abruptly on 15 August when Japan capitulated. Whiteside returned to Subic Bay on 16 August and remained there until the 20th when she moved to Batangas on Luzon to load elements of the 1st Cavalry Division for occupation duty in Japan. On 24 August, she departed Batangas in company with Task Force (TF) 33, the Tokyo occupation force. After a 48-hour stopover in Subic Bay, occasioned by a typhoon, she arrived at Yokohama, Japan, on 2 September, the day of the formal surrender ceremonies conducted on board Missouri (BB-63) in Tokyo Bay. Over the next two days, she unloaded her embarked troops and their attendant cargo and, on the 4th, shaped a course for Leyte.

== Post-war ==
Whiteside arrived at Leyte on 11 September, fueled and provisioned, and then headed for Mindanao to load troops and cargo of the Army's 41st Infantry Division. She completed her mission at Mindanao on 19 September and departed the island on the 20th, returning to Tacloban on Leyte. On the 22nd, the attack cargo ship stood out of Leyte Gulf on her way to Kure, Japan. Diverted to Buckner Bay, Okinawa, en route, the ship did not reach Japan until 5 October. She remained in Japan until 15 October at which time she got underway for Manila in the Philippines to load landing craft for duty in conjunction with the transfer of Nationalist Chinese troops. She arrived in Manila on 21 October and departed again on the 23rd. On the 26th, she arrived in Hai Phong, French Indochina, and began loading troops and cargo of the 583rd Regiment of the Nationalist Chinese Army. The attack cargo ship stood out of Hai Phong on 30 October and set a course for Chinwangtao where she arrived on 7 November. She disembarked the Chinese troops on the 7th and departed Chinwangtao the following day, bound for Taku. The ship remained at Taku until early December when she got underway for the United States. She arrived in San Francisco on 27 December.

Whiteside remained at San Francisco until the summer of 1946. On 5 June, she got underway for the Marshall Islands to provide support services for "Operation Crossroads", the large-scale nuclear tests conducted at Bikini Atoll that summer. She reached Kwajalein Atoll on 17 June and remained in the Marshalls assisting the operation until the end of August when she embarked upon a voyage that took her to Okinawa, Guam, Eniwetok, and thence back to Pearl Harbor. The ship remained at Pearl Harbor from the end of October to the latter part of November.

On 23 November, she departed Oahu and set a course for the Marshalls. She arrived at Majuro on 30 November, visited Kwajalein during the first week in December, and Eniwetok in mid-month, before beginning a voyage that took her via Guam and Japan to China. She arrived in Yokosuka, Japan, on 16 January 1947 and, for the next six weeks, made port visits to Sasebo, Qingdao and Shanghai. On 5 March, she departed Qingdao and shaped a course — via Okinawa and Oahu — for the California coast. She arrived at San Francisco on 28 April and remained there until 15 June when she headed back to the Far East. Whiteside reached Qingdao on 3 July and stayed there until 27 July when she sailed for Shanghai. From there, she moved on to Sasebo and thence to Yokosuka where she lay in port from 10 August to 3 September. The ship visited Okinawa during the second week in September and then spent the rest of the month at Guam in the Marianas. She returned to Qingdao on 7 October but departed again five days later headed — via Yokosuka — back to the west coast.

Whiteside arrived in San Francisco on 29 October to begin a seven-month tour of duty plying the waters along the west coast of North America. She visited ports ranging south to San Diego and north to Adak and Kodiak in Alaska, though for the most part she remained in Californian waters. On 10 June 1948, she departed San Francisco to return to the western Pacific. She stopped at Pearl Harbor in mid-June and then continued on to Qingdao where she arrived on 7 July. She visited Shanghai, Sasebo, and Yokosuka in July and August. Early in September, she stopped at Subic Bay in the Philippines before continuing on to the Marianas where she made port calls at Guam and Saipan. From Saipan, she set a course for Pearl Harbor on 21 September. Following a seven-day stop at Oahu, the attack cargo ship continued her voyage east on 7 October and arrived in Oakland, California, on the 12th. She remained there until 26 November when she got underway to return to the Far East. The ship made Yokosuka late in December and visited Kogo Saki, Sasebo, and Qingdao before beginning the return voyage late in January 1949.

On her way home, Whiteside made a 16-day stopover at Pearl Harbor before continuing on to San Francisco, where she arrived on 27 February. The ship remained there until 7 May when she moved to San Diego. After a pause at the latter port from 8 May to 11 May, she departed there on the 11th and steamed, via Pearl Harbor, back to Yokosuka, which port she entered on 9 June. Over the following five weeks, she stopped at Sasebo, Okinawa, Taiwan, and Subic Bay before departing the latter place on 18 July to return home. Following the customary stop at Pearl Harbor from 30 July to 6 August, she resumed her voyage and entered San Francisco Bay on 11 August. In late August and early September, she made a round-trip voyage from the west coast to Pearl Harbor and back before entering the Mare Island Naval Shipyard for a three-month overhaul. She completed repairs on 4 January 1950 and departed Mare Island that same day, bound for the Orient. She enjoyed a month at Oahu, from 10 January to 11 February, and then continued on to Manila where she arrived on 24 February. During March, she visited Subic Bay, Guam, and Saipan before heading home on 6 April. On the night of 25 April and 26 April, Whiteside shifted to San Francisco where she remained for a month before embarking upon a voyage to the Marshall Islands. That voyage, which lasted from 26 May to 10 July, included both outbound and return voyage stops at Pearl Harbor in addition to visits to Eniwetok and Kwajalein Atolls.

== Korean War service ==
While Whiteside completed the return voyage to the west coast, events in the Far East ordained her return to that theater of operations. On 25 June, the armed forces of communist North Korea invaded the Republic of Korea (ROK), and the United States moved rapidly to bolster South Korea. With elements of the 1st Provisional Marine Brigade (Reinforced) embarked, Whiteside stood out of San Diego on 14 July, bound for Japan. She made port at Yokosuka on the 30th and, by 2 August, was at Pusan, South Korea, the major port through which United Nations men and materiel were being funneled into the conflict, and landed her marines. She departed Pusan on 5 August and reentered Yokosuka two days later. On the night of 1/2 September, she moved to Kobe and, on the 10th, from there to Inchon carrying troops and supplies to assault Inchon and begin the drive on Seoul. She remained at Inchon from the day of the initial landings, 15 September, until D plus 6 at which time she headed back to Japan. She arrived in Sasebo on the 22nd but departed there again the next day to return to the United States. The attack cargo ship arrived at San Francisco on 8 October and remained there for three weeks before getting underway to return to the Far East. After a non-stop voyage, she arrived in Sasebo on 17 November. On the 23rd, she weighed anchor for Yokosuka where she entered port on the 25th. After a 10-day stay at Yokosuka and a brief stop at Sasebo, Whiteside arrived at Inchon on 10 December to participate in the evacuation of United Nations forces on the heels of the massive communist Chinese intervention. The ship returned to Yokosuka on 17 December and headed for home on the 20th. She arrived in San Francisco on 5 January 1951.

Two round-trip voyages between San Francisco and Sasebo occupied her time between February and August 1951. From August to early December, she operated on the west coast and then headed back to the western Pacific. After stops at Sasebo and Yokosuka, Whiteside returned to San Francisco on 7 February 1952. The routine, voyages between San Francisco and Japan, occupied her for the remainder of her active career. She completed her last round-trip to the Orient on 28 February 1957 and, after almost a year of west coast operations, was decommissioned at Astoria, Oregon, on 30 January 1958. Whiteside remained in reserve with the Pacific Reserve Fleet until the spring of 1971 at which time she was sunk as a target.

== Awards ==
Whiteside earned two battle stars for World War II service and four battle stars for service in the Korean War.
