= USS Mathews =

Cargo ship of the United States Navy

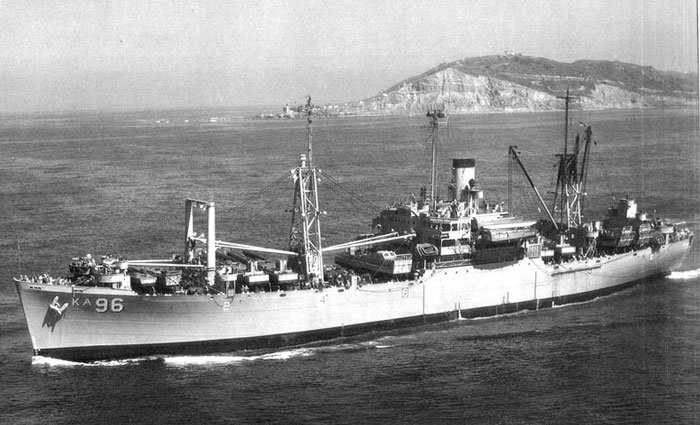
- USS Mathews (AKA-96)

History

United States
- Name: USS Mathews
- Namesake: Mathews County, Virginia
- Builder: Federal Shipbuilding and Drydock Company, Kearny, New Jersey
- Laid down: 15 September 1944
- Launched: 22 December 1944
- Commissioned: 15 March 1945
- Decommissioned: 4 April 1947
- Recommissioned: 16 February 1952
- Decommissioned: 31 October 1968
- Stricken: 1 November 1968
- Fate: Sold for scrap, 1969

General characteristics
- Class & type: Andromeda-class attack cargo ship
- Type: Type C2-S-B1
- Displacement: 6,761 long tons (6,869 t)
- Length: 459 ft 2 in (139.95 m)
- Beam: 63 ft (19 m)
- Draft: 26 ft 4 in (8.03 m)
- Speed: 16.5 knots (30.6 km/h; 19.0 mph)
- Complement: 247
- Armament: 1 × 5"/38 caliber gun mount; 4 × twin 40 mm gun mounts

USS Mathews (AKA-96) was an Andromeda-class attack cargo ship named after Mathews County, Virginia. She served as a commissioned ship for 18 years and 8 months.

Mathews (AKA–96) was laid down on 15 September 1944 under Maritime Commission contract by the Federal Shipbuilding and Drydock Co., Kearny, N.J., launched on 22 December 1944, sponsored by Miss Mary Margaret McBride, acquired by the Navy on 3 March 1945, and commissioned on 15 March 1945.

== Service history ==
=== 1945–1947 ===
With less than a month's training behind her, Mathews departed Norfolk on 8 April 1945 for the Pacific with military cargo and passengers. Stopping briefly in Hawaii for further training, she steamed on to Eniwetok and Ulithi, arriving at the latter on 21 June. On 10 July, with Army passengers and equipment on board, she sailed for Okinawa, which had recently been secured after 82 days of fighting. Mathews entered Hagushi Bay on 14 July, remaining until the 22nd when she departed for Ulithi. From there she carried cargo to Guadalcanal and Guam. While en route to the latter, she received word of Japan's unconditional surrender.

Proceeding to the Philippines from Guam, she began ferrying occupation troops to the American zone of Korea; and for the next 2½ months she operated between Lingayen Gulf and Jinsen, Korea. On 19 November, her passenger accommodations filled with returning veterans, she departed Korea for the United States, arriving Norfolk on 23 December. She remained on the east coast until 2 October 1946, when she sailed for San Francisco and deactivation. Arriving on 26 October, she decommissioned there on 4 April 1947 and was turned over to the Maritime Commission at Suisun Bay.

=== 1951–1967 ===
Reacquired by the Navy in 1951, Mathews recommissioned on 16 February 1952 and reported for duty with the Amphibious Force, Pacific Fleet, on 17 March. After training at Long Beach she sailed for the Pribilof Islands, on a resupply assignment on 1 July returning with a cargo of seal products. A year later, on 1 July 1953, the attack cargo ship got underway for Korea where she transported prisoners–of–war, primarily Chinese, from Koje-do to Inchon, the port of exchange. Returning to Long Beach on 23 April 1954, Mathews trained along the west coast through 1955. These operations were interrupted only by another resupply mission to Pribilof, from which she again returned with a cargo of valuable seal products.

In 1956, Mathews again deployed with the 7th Fleet. Assigned to that fleet's amphibious force 12 January–4 October, she participated in squadron and fleet exercises from Japan to the Philippines, joining in the Black Ship Festival at Shimoda on 17 to 21 May. During 1957, Mathews was involved for the most part in amphibious training operations along the coast of Southern California. She made WestPac deployments in 1958, 1959, and 1960, again resupplying Pribiloff after her 1958 cruise. 1961 saw Mathews operating off the west coast.

On 22 January 1962, Mathews once again departed for duty with the 7th Fleet. Towards the end of her tour, as Communist insurgency in Laos continued to threaten Thailand, she was called on to transport Marines and cargo support elements of the 3rd Marine Division from Okinawa to Bangkok. Arriving on 9 June, her passengers and cargo added strength to the 1,800 marines landed on 16 May, at the request of the Thai government, and positioned defensively in the north.

Mathews returned to Long Beach on 30 July, but within three months was again called on to aid in the thwarting of Communist military plans. In late October, as the crisis over the USSR's establishment of missile bases on Cuba mounted, Mathews was attached to the Atlantic Fleet and throughout the quarantine period operated with amphibious groups in the Caribbean, returning to California on 16 December.

Her annual deployments to WestPac since 1962 further involved the ship in anti–Communist activities. In 1963–64, she served a month, mid–December to mid–January, as a unit of the Amphibious Ready Group at Subic Bay. During June, July, and August, 1965, she shuttled troops and cargo from Okinawa to Da Nang and Chu Lai, South Vietnam, and in October, Republic of Korea Army units from Pusan, Korea, to Qui Nhơn. She arrived back at Long Beach on 2 December only to depart again on 10 January 1966 for Okinawa with Marine artillery elements embarked, returning to California in March.

On 2 May, Mathews got underway for her third western Pacific deployment in 370 days, with Marine engineers on board en route to Chu Lai. She then shuttled between Subic Bay, Da Nang, and Huế, before departing for Yokosuka and Long Beach, arriving there on 23 July and engaging in amphibious, tactical and engineering exercises for the remainder of the year.

After operations on the west coast through the first half of 1967. Mathews sailed for the Far East on 21 July 1967 to resume her role in the struggle against Communist aggression in Vietnam. She remained in the western Pacific into 1968, sailing for the west coast on 4 February with calls at Okinawa, Yokosuka, and Pearl Harbor before reaching Long Beach on 19 March. After operating off the California coast for the next seven months, Mathews put into San Diego on 14 October.

=== Decommissioning and sale ===
She decommissioned at San Diego on 31 October 1968, and was struck from the Navy List on 1 November 1968. She was sold for scrap in 1969.
