= USS Oglethorpe =

Cargo ship of the United States Navy

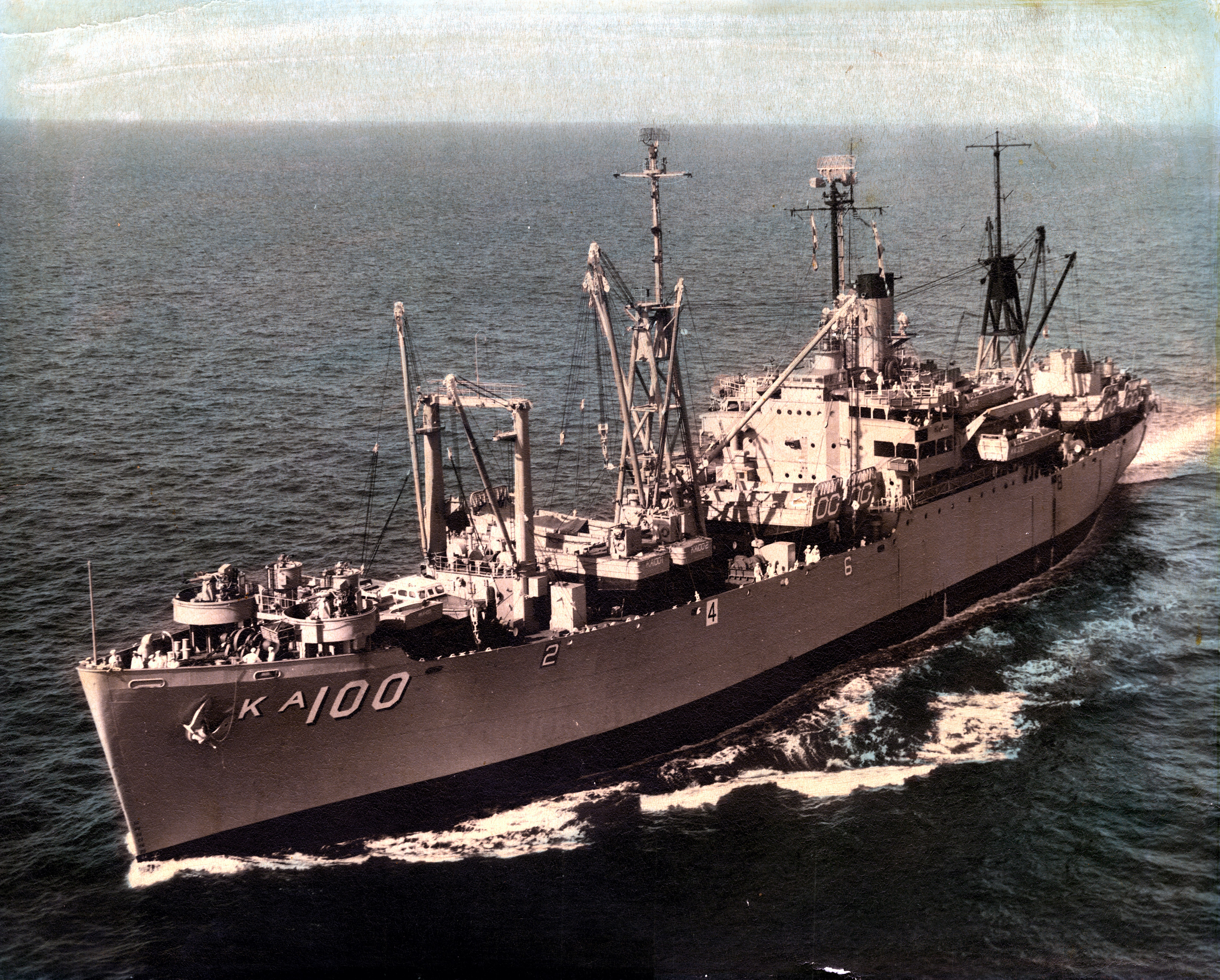

History

United States
- Name: USS Oglethorpe
- Namesake: Oglethorpe County, Georgia
- Builder: Federal Shipbuilding and Drydock Company, Kearny, New Jersey
- Laid down: 26 December 1944
- Launched: 15 April 1945
- Commissioned: 6 June 1945
- Decommissioned: 1 November 1968
- Stricken: 1 November 1968
- Honors and awards: 2 battle stars (Korea)
- Fate: Scrapped August 1969

General characteristics
- Class & type: Andromeda-class attack cargo ship
- Type: Type C2-S-B1
- Displacement: 14,200 long tons (14,428 t) full
- Length: 459 ft 2 in (139.95 m)
- Beam: 63 ft (19 m)
- Draft: 26 ft 4 in (8.03 m)
- Speed: 16.5 knots (30.6 km/h; 19.0 mph)
- Complement: 425
- Armament: 1 × 5"/38 caliber gun mount; 4 × twin 40 mm gun mounts

USS Oglethorpe (AKA-100) was an Andromeda-class attack cargo ship in service with the United States Navy from 1945 to 1968. She was scrapped in 1969.

== History ==
Oglethorpe (AKA-100) was named after a county in Georgia, which in turn was named in honor of James Oglethorpe, the founder of the state. She was laid down on 26 December 1944 by the Federal Shipbuilding and Drydock Company, Kearny, New Jersey, under contract for the Maritime Commission. Transferred to the Navy while still on the ways, she was launched on 15 April 1945, sponsored by Mrs. Ellsworth Buck, wife of the New York Congressman; and commissioned at the Brooklyn Navy Yard, New York, on 6 June 1945.

=== 1945–1950 ===
Following shakedown in Chesapeake Bay, she served as a training vessel at Little Creek, Virginia, and Newport, Rhode Island. On 1 August 1945, the ship sailed for Pearl Harbor via the Panama Canal. Receiving news of Japan's surrender en route, the ship continued on to the Western Pacific. After carrying general cargo between Pearl Harbor, Kwajalein, Guadalcanal, and Nouméa, in December 1945 she returned to the United States and was assigned to the Naval Transportation Service and, later, Military Sea Transportation Service. Remaining a commissioned ship, she carried cargo in the Western Pacific until 25 June 1950.

=== 1950–1959 ===
When the Communists invaded the Republic of Korea, she joined amphibious forces in Yokosuka, Japan on 9 July. Quickly converted in Japan for wartime operation, Oglethorpe carried equipment for the 1st Cavalry Division to Po Hung Dong, Korea, where the troops landed on 18 July. Returning to San Diego in August, she embarked men and equipment of the 1st Marine Division. Arriving off Inchon, Korea on 15 September, for six days she supported the amphibious assault which briefly reversed the course of the war, sending Communist troops scurrying back to North Korea.

After a round trip to Japan, she reloaded equipment of the 1st Marine Division for the assault at Wonsan. Arriving off Wonsan on 25 October she supported the operation until the 30th and then returned to the West Coast.

Transferred to the Atlantic Fleet in January 1951 and anchored in Norfolk, VA, Oglethorpe participated in amphibious training along the East Coast and in the Caribbean and Mediterranean. During this period her chief medical officer was LT. Rene A. Fontaine. In October 1955, she made two trips to aid flood-stricken Tampico, Mexico. Crewmen in six LCMs distributed food, clothing, and medicine to flood victims far up the swollen and treacherous Panuco River.

Resuming her pattern of operations alternating East Coast training and Mediterranean deployments, the ship was part of the fleet that brought the Marines to Lebanon in July 1958.

=== 1960–1968 ===
In October 1962, Oglethorpe stood ready off Cuba when President Kennedy demanded the removal of Soviet missiles. The prompt and firm employment of U.S. Naval power forced the rapid withdrawal of the offensive missiles and maintained peace in the Western Hemisphere. Once again in the Mediterranean, the ship joined the ready forces as hostilities heightened between Greek and Turkish factions on Cyprus in early 1964.

Returning from the Mediterranean in August 1966, the ship entered Boston Naval Shipyard in early January 1967. Following overhaul she continued her pattern of East Coast training and Mediterranean deployments until struck from the Navy List on 1 November 1968.

== Awards ==
Oglethorpe received two battle stars for Korean service.
