= USS Rolette =

United States Navy cargo ship (1945–1960)

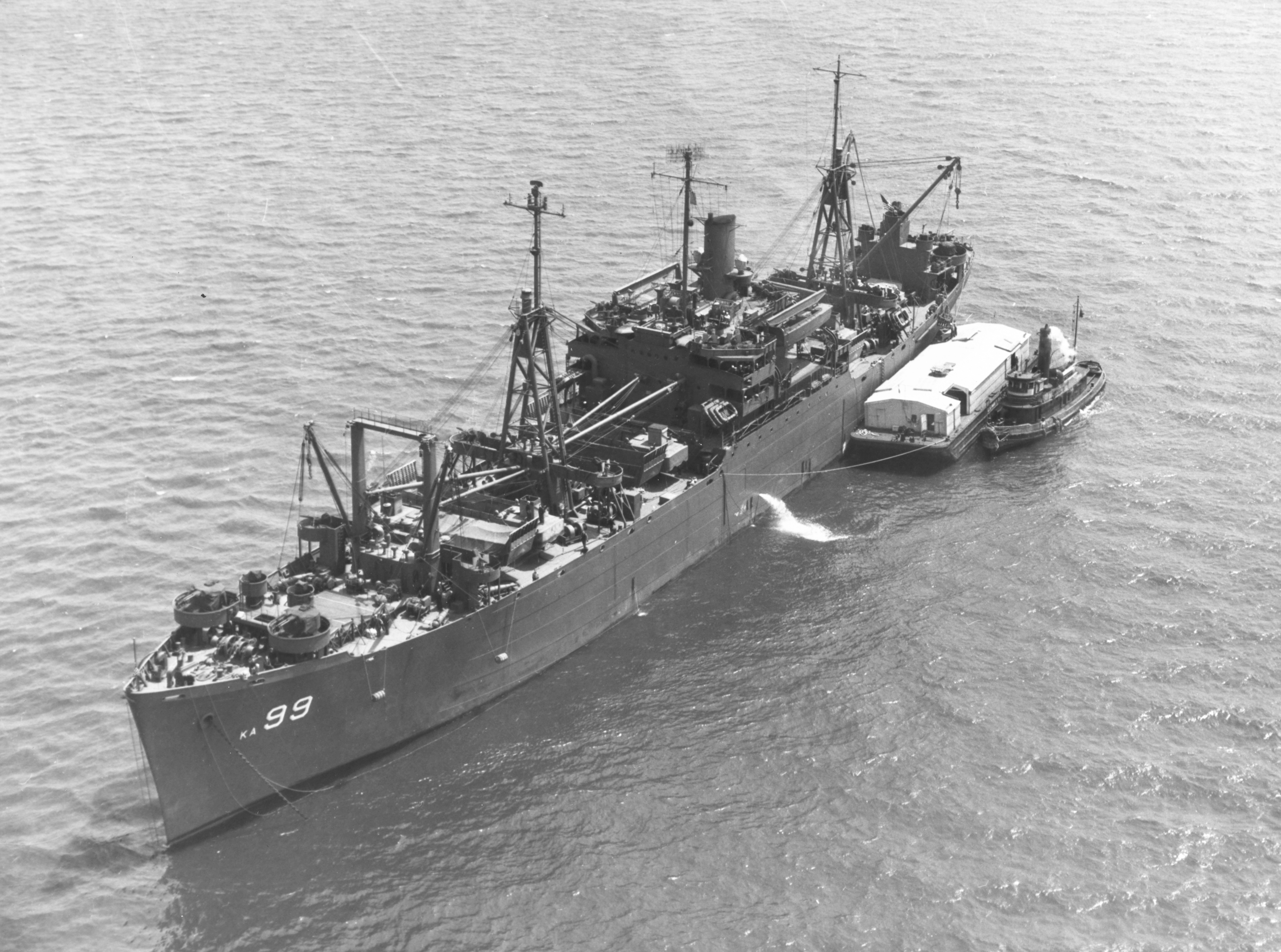
- USS Rolette (AKA-99) off New York City on 8 May 1945

History

United States
- Name: USS Rolette
- Namesake: Rolette County, North Dakota
- Builder: Federal Shipbuilding and Drydock Company, Kearny, New Jersey
- Laid down: 2 December 1944
- Launched: 11 March 1945
- Commissioned: 27 April 1945
- Decommissioned: late 1945
- Stricken: 23 April 1947
- Reinstated: 13 August 1951
- Recommissioned: 23 February 1952
- Decommissioned: 1 May 1956
- Stricken: 1 July 1960
- Fate: Scrapped 1978

General characteristics
- Class & type: Andromeda-class attack cargo ship
- Type: Type C2-S-B1
- Displacement: 14,200 long tons (14,428 t) full load
- Length: 459 ft 2 in (139.95 m)
- Beam: 63 ft (19 m)
- Draft: 26 ft 4 in (8.03 m)
- Speed: 17 knots (31 km/h; 20 mph)
- Complement: 425
- Armament: 1 × 5"/38 caliber gun mount; 4 × twin 40 mm gun mounts

USS Rolette (AKA-99) was an Andromeda-class attack cargo ship named after a county in North Dakota.

Attack cargo ship Rolette was laid down on 2 December 1944 by Federal Shipbuilding and Drydock Co., Kearny, NJ, for the Maritime Commission; launched on 11 March 1945, sponsored by Mrs. William U. Kirsch, acquired by the Navy on loan-charter on 26 April 1945, and commissioned at the Boston Navy Yard on 27 April 1945.

== Service history ==
=== 1945 ===
Rolette proceeded to Chesapeake Bay in May 1945, two days after Germany surrendered. She loaded her first cargo on the 30th and sailed for Pearl Harbor, where she unloaded and took on construction material for Guinan, Samar Island, Philippine Islands. As the crew was discharging her cargo there in mid-August, they heard of the Japanese surrender. Rolette was ordered to operate with the amphibious ships carrying the Army Occupation Forces to Japan from the Philippines. During September and October she debarked troops at Tokyo, Hokkaidō, and Hakodate.

The transport returned to the United States toward the close of 1945, and decommissioned at San Francisco, where she was a unit of the Reserve Fleet until struck from the Navy List on 23 April 1947.

=== 1951–1956 ===
Rolette was reacquired by the Navy on 13 August 1951 and recommissioned on 23 February on 1952 at Oakland, California. She proceeded to her homeport, Norfolk, Virginia, to operate as a unit of the United States Atlantic Fleet. From April to October 1953, the ship served with the 6th Fleet in the Mediterranean. On this deployment she landed food, medical supplies, and workers to aid the citizens of Argostoli, Greece, after a devastating earthquake.

Rolette underwent overhaul and refresher training during 1954, and on 5 January 1955 departed Norfolk for San Diego. On 31 March she joined an amphibious squadron for a six-month tour in the western Pacific and participation in landing exercise "Navmarlex 1-55" conducted at Okinawa in June. She returned to San Diego on 30 September, underwent a brief period of upkeep, and took part in the exercise "Pactrex 56" in November.

She decommissioned at Mare Island Naval Shipyard on 1 May 1956 and entered the Pacific Reserve Fleet, where she remained until struck from the Navy List on 1 July 1960.

=== Scrapping ===
Rolette arrived for breaking up at Portland, Oregon on 18 March 1978.
