= USS Andromeda =

Cargo ship of the United States Navy

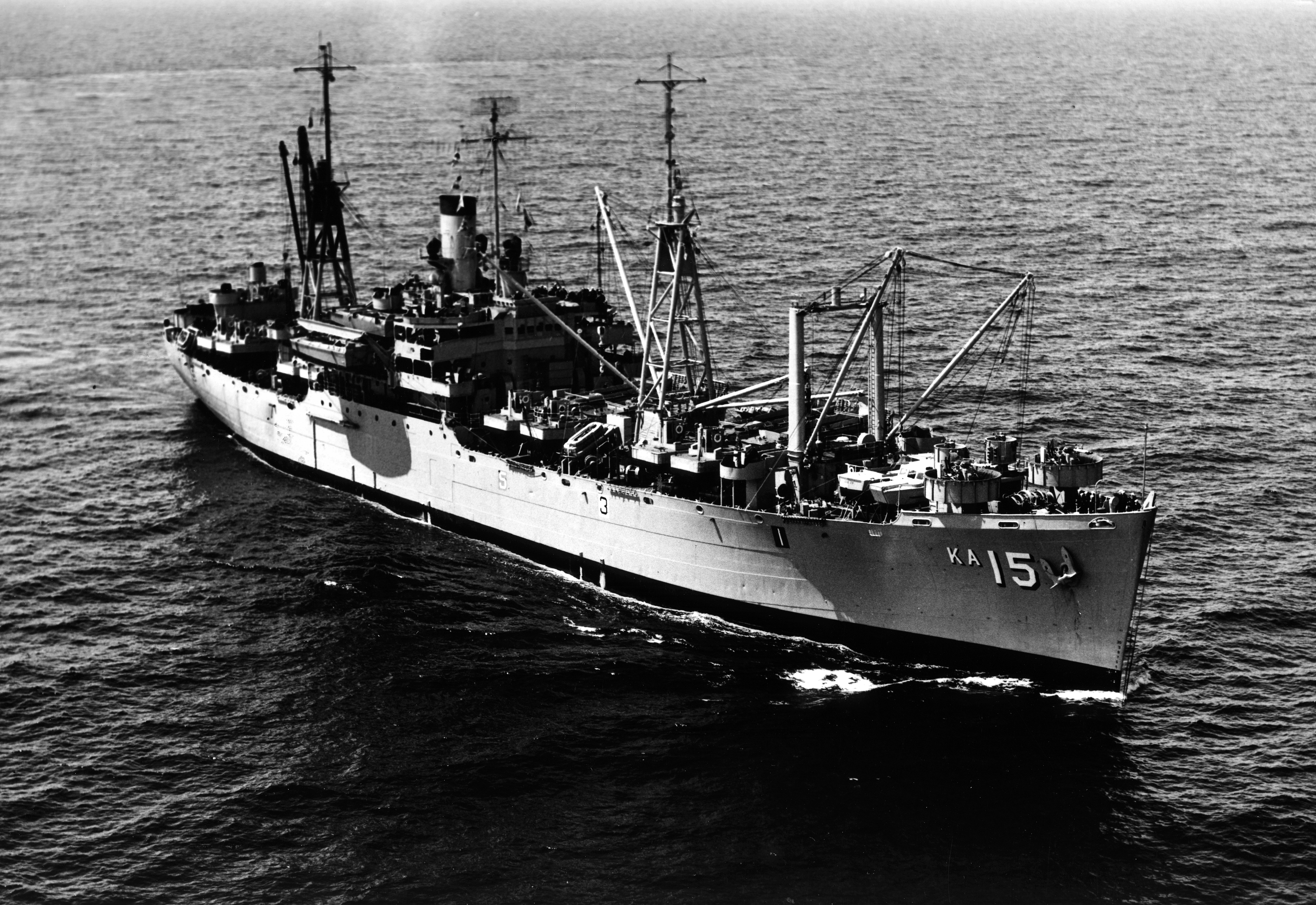
- USS Andromeda (AKA-15)

History

United States
- Name: USS Andromeda
- Namesake: The constellation Andromeda
- Laid down: 22 September 1942
- Launched: 22 December 1942
- Commissioned: 2 April 1943
- Decommissioned: 1 May 1956
- Stricken: 1 July 1960
- Fate: Sold in 1971

General characteristics
- Class & type: Andromeda-class attack cargo ship
- Displacement: 13,910 tons
- Length: 459 ft 3 in (139.98 m)
- Beam: 63 ft (19 m)
- Draft: 26 ft 4 in (8.03 m)
- Speed: 16.5 knots (30.6 km/h)
- Complement: 404
- Armament: 1 × 5 in (130 mm)/38 caliber dual purpose gun mount; 4 × 3 in (76 mm) gun mounts

USS Andromeda (AKA-15) was an Andromeda-class attack cargo ship in service with the United States Navy from 1943 to 1956. She was scrapped in 1971.

== History ==
Andromeda named after the constellation Andromeda. She was laid down on 22 September 1942 at Kearny, New Jersey, by the Federal Shipbuilding and Drydock Company under a Maritime Commission contract (MC hull 199); launched on 22 December 1942; sponsored by Mrs. Janet Roper; reclassified an attack cargo ship and redesignated AKA-15 on 1 February 1943; delivered to the Navy on 30 March 1943; and commissioned at the New York Navy Yard on 2 April 1943.

=== World War II ===
The attack cargo ship made her maiden voyage late in April from New York to Norfolk, Virginia, and then conducted shakedown training in Chesapeake Bay. On 8 June, she put to sea with a convoy bound for the Mediterranean Sea. Andromeda arrived in Mers el Kebir, Algeria, on the 22nd and began training for the Allied invasion of Sicily. On 5 July, the attack cargo ship left Oran, Algeria, with Task Force (TF) 85 and set a course for the southern coast of Sicily. She and her colleagues in Cent Force arrived in the transport area off Scoglitti during the night of the 9th and 10th. Allied troops stormed ashore in the darkness of the early morning hours of the 10th, and Andromeda spent the next two days disgorging her cargo. Late in the evening of the 12th, she departed the area in company with Ancon, 10 other auxiliaries, and an escort of nine destroyers.

Returning to Oran, Andromeda spent the next few weeks at several locations on the North African coast preparing for another amphibious assault. On 5 September, the attack cargo ship stood out of Mers el Kebir with Task Group (TG) 81.2, the transport group of the Southern Attack Force for the invasion of the Italian mainland just to the southeast of Naples on the shores of the Gulf of Salerno. She arrived at her destination late in the evening of the 8th. Early the next morning, troops of the Army's 36th Division stormed ashore at Salerno. Andromeda remained in the transport area in the gulf until the 10th discharging troops and equipment to fuel the offensive. She departed the area during the last watch of the 10th with a convoy bound for Oran, Algeria. The attack cargo ship anchored in Oran on the morning of the 14th. On the 19th, she headed back to Salerno carrying supplies and reinforcements. Andromeda unloaded at Salerno on the 22nd and the 23rd and then embarked upon the return voyage to Algeria.

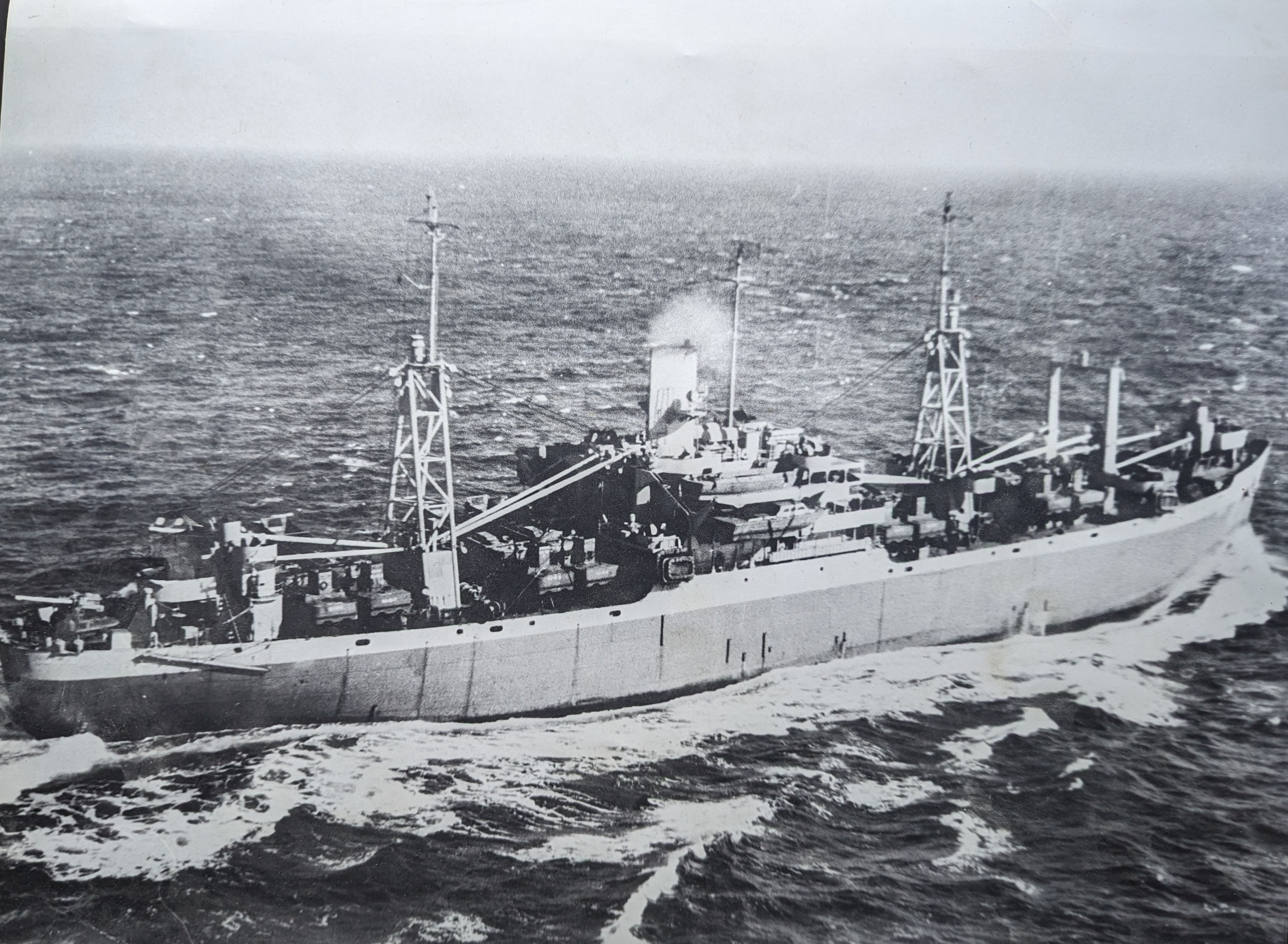
The Andromeda at sea

She arrived at Mers el Kebir on 26 September. The attack cargo ship spent about six weeks practicing amphibious landings with American and Free French troops on the Algerian coast at Mers el Kebir, Oran, and Arzew. Between 5 November and 7 November, she made the passage to Bizerte, Tunisia, where she loaded cargo and embarked troops until the 19th. Departing Bizerte, Andromeda made a six-day stop at Mers el Kebir between 23 November and 29 November and an overnight pause at Oran on the 29th and 30th before joining a convoy bound for the British Isles. The ship visited Belfast in Northern Ireland and several ports in Scotland and then headed across the Atlantic on 18 December.

Andromeda arrived in Norfolk, Virginia, on 2 January 1944 and began a yard overhaul on the 3rd. On 13 February and 14 February, the attack cargo ship made the passage to New York. She loaded cargo at New York and then, on 27 February, put to sea with a convoy bound for Europe. She reached Newport in Wales on 9 March and unloaded cargo on the 10th, 11th, and 12th. After visiting several Scottish ports, Andromeda stood out of the River Clyde on 29 March and shaped course for North Africa. The ship reached Mers el Kebir again on 6 April and spent the next two months conducting amphibious training on the Algerian coast between Mers el Kebir and Arzew.

On 16 June, the attack cargo ship left the North African coast for the Italian boot. She entered Naples on the 19th and remained there until the 23rd. Steaming by way of Palermo, Sicily, Andromeda made Algiers on 7 July. She loaded cargo and got underway again for Naples on the 8th. Arriving at her destination on 10 July, she divided her time between Naples and the Gulf of Pozzuoli for the rest of the month. Andromeda spent the first part of August in the Bay of Castellamare waiting for the beginning of Operation "Dragoon", the invasion of southern France. The attack cargo ship left the Bay of Castellamare on 12 August and arrived off the invasion beaches on the 15th. She unloaded her cargo and headed back to Oran on the 16th. For over two months, the ship went back and forth across the Mediterranean Sea carrying supplies and reinforcements from North Africa to the armies operating ashore in southern France.

On 25 October 1944, however, she set out from Mers el Kebir to return to the United States. Andromeda arrived in Boston, Mass., on 8 November and commenced a month of repairs on the 9th. After loading cargo at Davisville, R.I., the attack cargo ship put to sea for the journey to the Pacific. Steaming by way of Norfolk, she arrived in the Canal Zone at the end of December, transited the canal on the 31st and resumed her voyage west on New Year's Day 1945. She entered Pearl Harbor on 15 January and began the ubiquitous cargo loading operation. On 24 January, the ship got underway for the southwestern Pacific. She unloaded cargo at Nouméa, New Caledonia, between 3 February and 7 February and then returned to sea bound for the Solomon Islands.

On 10 February, Andromeda arrived at Guadalcanal. She spent the ensuing five weeks in the Solomon Islands carrying out amphibious exercises in preparation for the assault on Okinawa. The attack cargo ship left the Solomons on 15 March bound ultimately for the campaign about to unfold in the Ryukyu Islands. She entered Ulithi Atoll in the Caroline Islands on the 21st and bided her time until the 27th when her portion of the invasion force sortied from the lagoon. Andromeda arrived in the transport area off Okinawa on L-day, 1 April. The soldiers and marines carried out their landing that morning, and support ships like Andromeda began to disgorge supplies and equipment. The attack cargo ship stayed in the vicinity for nine days. During that time, the Japanese launched massive air attacks in an attempt to thwart the offensive. Andromeda went to general quarters time after time to help beat off the aerial onslaught and, on at least one occasion, helped to splash one of the intruders.

The attack cargo ship cleared the Ryukyu Islands on 9 April and laid in a course for Hawaii. She pulled into Pearl Harbor on the 24th and loaded cargo until near the middle of May. On 12 May, Andromeda put to sea on her way back to Okinawa. Steaming by way of Eniwetok in the Marshalls and Ulithi in the Carolines, the ship reached Okinawa on 7 June. She stayed there for a week then headed back to Pearl Harbor on the 14th. Andromeda reentered Pearl Harbor on 29 June and then conducted training at Maui before setting a course for the Mariana Islands. She reached Saipan on 28 July and passed a fortnight in the Marianas. Andromeda returned to sea on 11 August, and hostilities ended four days later when she was half the way to the Solomons. She spent the period 18 to 23 August in the Solomons and returned to the Marianas at Guam on the 30th.

During the two months following Japan's surrender, Andromeda carried out two missions to the home islands and made a voyage to Manila in the Philippines. After embarking servicemen at Sasebo, Japan, the attack cargo ship got underway for the United States on 6 November. After a nonstop voyage, she returned to American soil at Seattle, Washington, on 22 November. The ship spent four weeks there before heading south to San Francisco, California, where she arrived on 22 December 1945.

=== Cold War ===
Andromeda remained on active duty during the late 1940s and early 1950s. She made cargo runs between the west coast and American bases at such places as Pearl Harbor, Midway, Wake Island, Kwajalein, Guam, and Saipan. In September and October 1949, the attack cargo ship made a round-trip voyage from the West Coast to the East Coast and back. She resumed operations from her base on the west coast upon her return. In August 1950, she voyaged north to the Pribilof Islands and, in March 1951, left the west coast for the Far East. Andromeda provided logistics support for United Nations forces fighting the Korean War until returning to San Diego at the end of the year. After 10 months of duty on the west coast, the ship returned to the Orient and logistics support for the United Nations defense of South Korea. She took up duty along the west coast in the spring of 1953, but interrupted it for a round-trip voyage to Yokosuka, Japan, in August and early September. Andromeda deployed to the Far East in 1954 and participated in Operation Passage to Freedom, the evacuation of refugees from North Vietnam in August and September. The attack cargo ship came back to the west coast from that assignment in October and arrived in San Diego on 20 November and operated on the Pacific Coast. In June 1955 the ship sailed to Seattle in preparation for the Dewline Operation. On 6 July the ship sailed north to Icy Cape, and when the ice cleared, went around Pt. Barrow and then to her offloading sites as far east as Cape Peary in Amundsen Gulf. During this operation in the ice, the ship broke the palm of her rudder. The ship was evacuated of none essential personnel and towed back to Pt. Barrow where the personnel were backloaded. Andromeda was then tow to Seattle arriving early October. Long gashes in the hull from contact with the ice could not be repaired and the ship was deactivated.

=== Decommissioning and fate ===
Andromeda was placed out of commission at San Diego on 1 May 1956. She was transferred to the Maritime Administration for lay up with the National Defense Reserve Fleet at Olympia, Washington Her name was struck from the Navy List on 1 July 1960, and she was sold to the Marine Power & Equipment Co., of Seattle, Washington, on 12 March 1971.

== Awards ==
Andromeda earned five battle stars during World War II and five battle stars for service in the Korean War
