= USS Whitley =

Cargo ship of the United States Navy

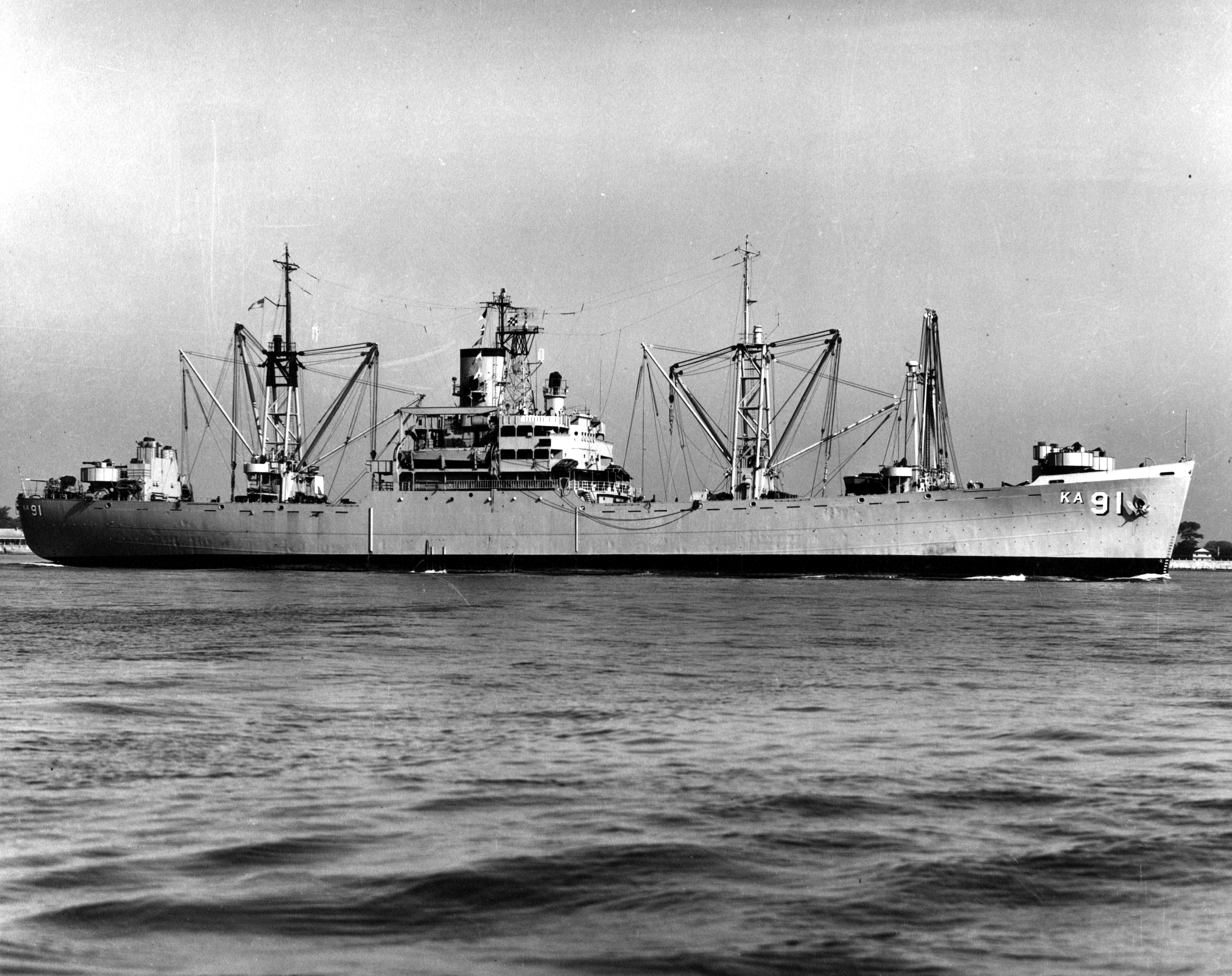

History

United States
- Name: USS Whitley
- Namesake: Whitley County, Indiana; Whitley County, Kentucky
- Builder: Moore Dry Dock Company, Oakland, California
- Laid down: 2 May 1944
- Launched: 22 June 1944
- Commissioned: 21 September 1944
- Decommissioned: 16 August 1955
- Stricken: 1 July 1960
- Reinstated: 1 December 1961
- Stricken: 1 May 1973
- Honours and awards: 1 battle star (World War II)
- Fate: Loaned to Italy, February 1962; Sold outright, 1 May 1973

History

Italy
- Name: Etna (A5328)
- Namesake: Mount Etna
- Acquired: February 1962
- Fate: Scrapped, July 1979

General characteristics
- Class & type: Andromeda-class attack cargo ship
- Type: Type C2-S-B1
- Displacement: 13,910 long tons (14,133 t) full
- Length: 459 ft 2 in (139.95 m)
- Beam: 63 ft (19 m)
- Draft: 26 ft 4 in (8.03 m)
- Speed: 16.5 knots (30.6 km/h; 19.0 mph)
- Complement: 366
- Armament: 1 × 5"/38 caliber gun mount; 4 × twin 40 mm gun mounts

USS Whitley (AKA-91) was an Andromeda-class attack cargo ship in service with the United States Navy from 1944 to 1955. In 1962, she was transferred to Italy where she served as Etna (L9870) until she was scrapped in 1979.

== History ==
Whitley (AKA-91) named after counties in Indiana and Kentucky. She was laid down on 2 May 1944 at Oakland, California, by the Moore Dry Dock Co. under a Maritime Commission contract (MC hull 1191), launched on 22 June 1944, sponsored by Mrs. John R. Reilly, delivered to the Navy on 21 September 1944, and commissioned that same day.

=== World War II, 1944–1945 ===
Following shakedown training out of San Diego, Whitley loaded cargo at San Francisco and sailed on 9 November, bound for the Hawaiian Islands. She arrived at Oahu on 27 November and remained in the islands until late January 1945 conducting amphibious training and testing amphibious equipment and techniques. On 27 January, the attack cargo ship departed Pearl Harbor and steamed for the western Pacific. The ship arrived in Eniwetok lagoon on 5 February, took on fuel and supplies, and then continued her voyage on the 7th. She arrived in the Marianas soon thereafter and conducted landing rehearsals at Saipan and Tinian until 16 February when she got underway for the Bonin Islands.

The attack cargo ship arrived off Iwo Jima at dawn on the 19th and began disembarking elements of the 5th Marine Division. She remained in the vicinity of Iwo Jima for eight days in all, but her only brush with combat came on the night of 23 and 24 February when her anti-aircraft battery briefly and inconclusively engaged two Japanese aircraft. In the evening of 27 February, she joined a convoy bound via the New Hebrides for Guadalcanal. The ship stopped at Espiritu Santo on 15 March and embarked members of the Royal New Zealand Air Force for transportation to Guadalcanal. At the latter island, she exchanged the New Zealanders for a complement of Hawaii-bound Marines.

Whitley arrived back at Oahu on 16 April. She conducted voyage repairs at Pearl Harbor and then underwent refresher training near Maui until 11 May when she left Hawaii with a convoy bound for San Francisco, where she arrived on 18 May. Two days later, she sailed for Aberdeen, Washington, where she loaded cargo bound for Hawaii. Whitley arrived at Oahu on 12 June and, after a 10-day stopover, got underway for the ammunition depot at Bangor, Washington. There, in mid-July, the attack cargo ship took on another cargo for Hawaii, returned to Pearl Harbor later in the month, and remained there through the end of hostilities on 15 August.

=== Post-war operations, 1945 ===
The ship departed Oahu on 23 August and arrived in Lingayen Gulf in the Philippines on 24 September. There, she embarked troops of the Army's 27th Regimental Combat Team (RCT). On 1 October, she set sail for Japan and arrived off Wakayama on the 7th. After more than a fortnight's wait while minesweepers cleared the mines from Nagoya Channel, she anchored in Ise Bay near Nagoya on 27 October and began unloading her passengers and their equipment.

She departed Nagoya on 1 November and set course for the Marianas. She entered Apra Harbor, Guam, on the 8th, embarked Navy officers and men for transportation home; and began her homeward voyage on 17 November. Following stops at Oahu, Panama, and Jacksonville, Florida, Whitley arrived at Norfolk on 2 January 1946.

=== 1946–1951 ===
Repairs at Norfolk preceded a series of voyages between ports on the east coast – such as Bayonne, New Jersey, and Norfolk, Virginia – and places in the North Atlantic – such as NS Argentia, Newfoundland; Guantanamo Bay, Cuba; and Narsarsuaq, Greenland. In November, she began the first of three round-trip voyages from the east coast to Bremerhaven in Germany. Those four voyages occupied her time completely until August 1947.

Between August 1947 and May 1949, she made a series of training cruises and supply voyages from Norfolk and Bayonne to various locations in the Caribbean area. In May and June 1949, she added the Mediterranean Sea to her itinerary with a round-trip voyage from the east coast, via Casablanca, to Naples, Italy, where she embarked detaches from the 6th Fleet for transportation home. She arrived back in Norfolk on 29 June and resumed her passenger and cargo runs to bases in the Caribbean area. That employment occupied her time until the summer of 1950. On 12 July 1950, she embarked upon a voyage which took her to Thule, Greenland, and to Cornwallis Island in the far northern reaches of Canada. She returned to the United States at Boston on 31 August and spent the remainder of 1950 and the entire year of 1951 plying the waters along the Atlantic coast and in the Caribbean engaged in training exercises and transporting people and supplies between various bases. The only exception to that routine came in April and May 1951 when she made a round-trip voyage from Norfolk to Casablanca, Morocco, and back.

=== 1952–1954 ===
The year 1952 brought with it increased duty in European and African waters. On 16 January, she put to sea from Norfolk, bound, via Casablanca, for Naples and Genoa in Italy. She returned to Norfolk on 5 March; but, after a logistics run to Newfoundland in April, she embarked upon another voyage to the Mediterranean on 10 May. After visiting Golfe Juan and Naples, she headed back to the United States, arriving in Norfolk on 25 June. Two months of local operations ensued. On 26 August, the attack cargo ship headed to Greenock, Scotland, to participate in NATO's Operation Mainbrace, conducted off Norway's coast. At the conclusion of the exercise, she visited Portsmouth, England, before returning to Norfolk where she arrived on 11 October and resumed local operations and training and supply cruises to the Caribbean area. In November and December 1953, she made another round-trip voyage to Casablanca and Naples to carry cargo to the 6th Fleet. She returned to Norfolk on 23 December and then conducted local operations until 2 March 1954, when she began another deployment in the Mediterranean with the 6th Fleet. She sailed direct to Naples but, on the homeward voyage, stopped at Casablanca and at Portsmouth, England. She returned to Norfolk on 22 April and resumed her normal routine. Later in the year, she made her final voyage to the Mediterranean and then conducted fleet exercises in the West Indies.

=== Decommissioning and sale, 1955–1973 ===
On 29 January 1955, she entered the Monti Marine Shipyard in Brooklyn, New York, to begin inactivation overhaul. In April 1955, she moved south to Charleston, South Carolina, to complete the inactivation process. Whitley was decommissioned at Charleston on 16 August 1955.

The ship remained inactive, berthed with the Charleston Group, Atlantic Reserve Fleet, until 1 July 1960, when her name was struck from the Navy List, and she was transferred to the Maritime Administration for layup. She was reinstated on the Navy List on 1 December 1961 and then transferred to the Italian Navy in February 1962 as a loan.

She served as Etna (L9870) until 1 May 1973. She was returned to the United States Navy and simultaneously sold to the Italian Navy. Her name was struck from the Navy List for the last time on 1 May 1973. The Etna was scrapped at Naples in July 1979.

== Awards ==
Whitley earned one battle star during World War II.
