= USS Marquette =

Andromeda-class attack cargo ship

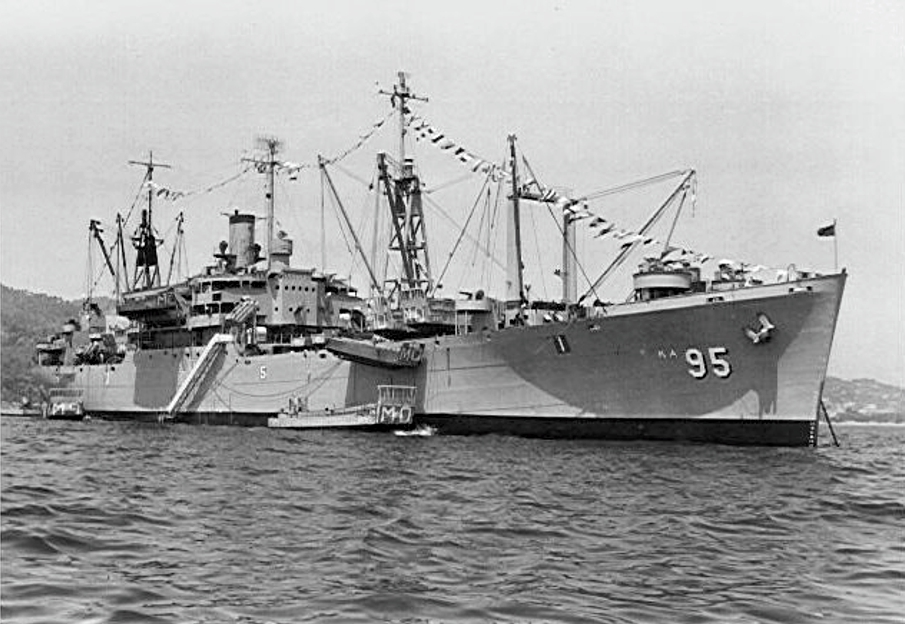

History

United States
- Name: USS Marquette
- Namesake: Marquette County, Michigan and Marquette County, Wisconsin
- Builder: Federal Shipbuilding and Drydock Company, Kearny, New Jersey
- Launched: 29 April 1945
- Commissioned: 20 June 1945
- Decommissioned: 19 July 1955
- Fate: Scrapped, 1972

General characteristics
- Class & type: Andromeda-class attack cargo ship
- Type: Type C2-S-B1
- Displacement: 6,761 long tons (6,869 t)
- Length: 459 ft 2 in (139.95 m)
- Beam: 63 ft (19 m)
- Draft: 26 ft 4 in (8.03 m)
- Speed: 16.5 knots (30.6 km/h; 19.0 mph)
- Complement: 247
- Armament: 1 × 5"/38 caliber gun mount; 4 × twin 40 mm gun mounts

USS Marquette (AKA-95) was an Andromeda-class attack cargo ship in service with the United States Navy from 1945 to 1955. She was scrapped in 1972.

== History ==
Marquette (AKA–95) was named after counties in Michigan and Wisconsin. She was built under Maritime Commission contract by the Federal Shipbuilding and Drydock Co., Kearny, N.J., was launched on 29 April 1945, sponsored by Mrs. Sydney B. Wertheimer, acquired by the Navy on loan charter from the Maritime Commission on 19 June 1945, and commissioned on 20 June 1945.

Two weeks prior to the end of hostilities in the Pacific, Marquette departed the east coast for Pearl Harbor. Arriving there on 23 August, she loaded cargo for the western Pacific and departed for Guam on 20 September. From Guam she continued on to Manus and Brisbane, where she picked up a cargo of food for the Philippines. Upon arrival at Samar, she discovered her cargo was no longer needed and had been transferred to UNRRA for use in Greece. She then proceeded to Piraeus, via Suez, discharged her cargo, and returned to Norfolk on 19 April 1946.

Marquette was then assigned to the Atlantic Fleet and for almost nine years served as a unit of that fleet's amphibious force. She participated regularly in type, squadron, and amphibious exercises which ranged from Greenland to the Caribbean. Her activities also included periodic deployment with the 6th Fleet and, from 15 August to 21 September 1947, a Brazilian cruise with congressional observers for the Rio Conference embarked. This conference resulted in the signing of the Inter-American Treaty of Reciprocal Assistance on 2 September.

Marquette's five 6th Fleet deployments, with units of the 2nd Marine Division on board, were conducted in 1948, 1949, 1951, 1952, and 1954. During these Mediterranean cruises she operated primarily in the eastern and southern sections of that sea. On her first such deployment, in July 1948, Marquette hosted a conference between the U.N. mediator in Palestine, Count Folke Bernadotte, and the commanding officers of units of TF 167 as tension, despite truce between Israel, Transjordan, and Egypt, continued to mount. On each successive deployment she was a source of stability in the troubled eastern Mediterranean.

On 5 January 1955, Marquette departed Norfolk for California. Arriving at San Pedro on the 23rd, she joined Transport Squadron 7, Pacific Fleet.

=== Decommissioning and fate ===
In mid–January 1955 she sailed to San Francisco where she was decommissioned on 19 July 1955 and joined the Pacific Reserve Fleet. On 9 January 1960 she was turned over to the Maritime Commission and placed in the National Defense Reserve Fleet. During 1969 she was berthed at Olympia, Washington. She was scrapped in 1972.

== Depictions ==
Marquette, while docked at Norfolk Navy Yard in 1951, appeared prominently in the film You're in the Navy Now.
