= USS Theenim =

Andromeda-class attack cargo ship

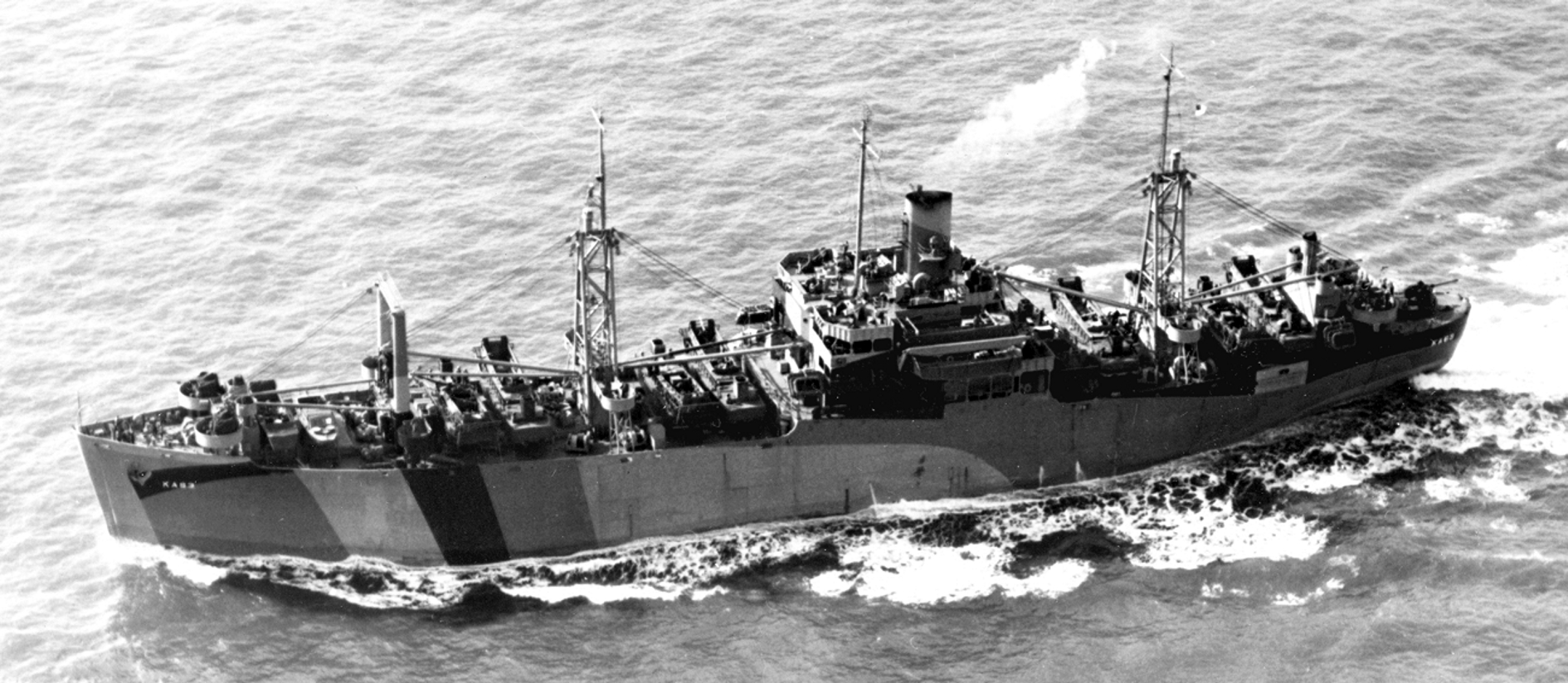

History

United States
- Name: USS Theenim
- Namesake: Theenim, a misspelling of Theemin, a star in the constellation Eridanus
- Builder: Federal Shipbuilding and Drydock Company, Kearny, New Jersey
- Laid down: 18 July 1944
- Launched: 31 October 1944
- Commissioned: 22 December 1944
- Decommissioned: 10 May 1946
- Stricken: 12 May 1946
- Honours and awards: 1 battle star (World War II)
- Fate: Scrapped, 1970

General characteristics
- Class & type: Andromeda-class attack cargo ship
- Type: Type C2-S-B1
- Displacement: 13,910 long tons (14,133 t) full
- Length: 459 ft (140 m)
- Beam: 63 ft (19 m)
- Draft: 26 ft 4 in (8.03 m)
- Speed: 16.5 knots (30.6 km/h; 19.0 mph)
- Complement: 399
- Armament: 1 × 5"/38 caliber gun mount; 4 × twin 40 mm gun mounts

USS Theenim (AKA-63) was an Andromeda class attack cargo ship of the United States Navy in service from 1944 to 1946. She was sold into commercial service in 1948 and was scrapped in 1970.

== History ==
USS Theenim was said to be named after a star in the constellation Eridanus. (Eridanus has no star of that name, but does have one named Theemin; possibly the ship's name is a misspelling.) Theenim was one of a handful of attack cargo manned by a Coast Guard crew in World War II. The ship was laid down under Maritime Commission contract (MC hull 215) on 18 July 1944 at Kearny, New Jersey, by the Federal Shipbuilding and Drydock Co., launched on 31 October 1944, sponsored by Mrs. Joseph Midder, and commissioned on 22 December 1944.

=== Pacific War ===
On 6 January 1945, Theenim got underway for Hampton Roads, Virginia, and a brief shakedown in the Chesapeake Bay-Virginia Capes area. After loading at Norfolk, the attack cargo ship got underway for the South Pacific on the 27th. The ship proceeded via the Panama Canal and Hawaii to the Solomon Islands, arriving at Guadalcanal on 5 March. Assigned to Amphibious Squadron 5, Theenim loaded troops and equipment and headed for the Marianas on 15 March. She sortied from the Saipan staging area on 27 March with Task Group 51.2, Demonstration Group "Charlie," for the assault on Okinawa. Theenim arrived off the Hagushi Beaches on 1 April, but did not land her troops until the 3rd, when she began offloading mobile equipment and debarking Marines. Three days later, she helped to splash a "Val" some 1,000 yards off her stern. On the 12th, her gunners shot down a "Zeke" that passed about 60 feet over her bridge. On the 15th, her gunners aided in the destruction of an "Oscar."

The next day, Theenim joined a convoy that was retiring to the Marianas, and she arrived at Saipan on 19 April. On 4 June, she stood put of Tanapag Harbor to return to the Solomons to pick up cargo and carry it to Guam where she arrived on 3 July. For the next three months — the last phase of the fighting and the early days of the occupation — the ship shuttled supplies between Saipan, Manus, Guadalcanal, Espiritu Santo, Leyte, Hokkaidō, and Honshū. On 5 November, she departed Tokyo Bay for the United States.

Theenim arrived at Portland, Oregon, on 17 November and moved down the coast to San Francisco on 9 December. On 27 December, the ship left the west coast for the Philippines and arrived at Subic Bay on 17 January 1946. She operated in the Philippine Islands until 19 March when she got underway for San Francisco. Upon her arrival on the west coast, the ship was ordered to report to the Atlantic Fleet for disposition. She reached Norfolk on 19 April. Theenim was decommissioned and returned to the War Shipping Administration on 10 May and was struck from the Navy List on 12 May 1946.

=== Commercial service ===
Renamed American Inventor in 1948 the ship carried on in merchant service under the house flag of the United States Lines, being renamed again, to Pioneer Surf, in 1958. Renamed Australian Surf in 1965, she operated under the flag of Farrell Lines, Inc., into the late 1960s.

== Awards ==
Theenim received one battle star for World War II service.
