= USS Hinsdale =

1944 Haskell-class attack transport

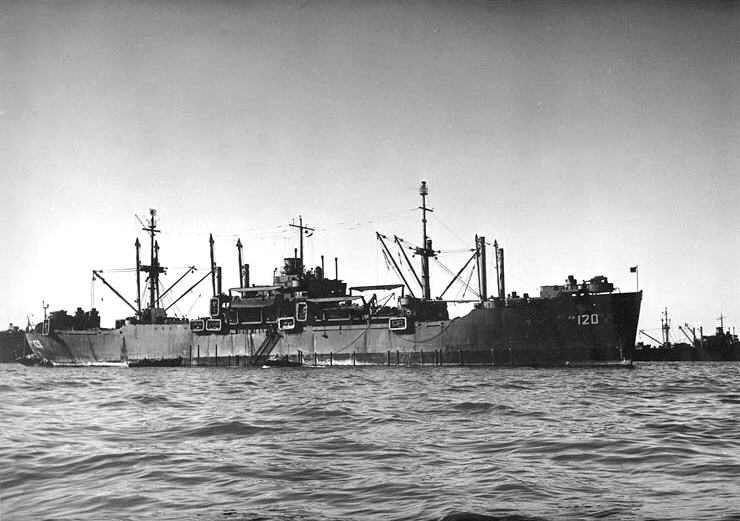
- USS Hinsdale (APA-120) at anchor in San Francisco Bay, California in late 1945 or early 1946.

History

United States
- Name: USS Hinsdale
- Namesake: Hinsdale County, Colorado
- Builder: California Shipbuilding Corporation
- Laid down: 21 June 1944
- Launched: 22 July 1944
- Commissioned: 15 October 1944
- Decommissioned: 8 April 1946
- Stricken: 1 May 1946
- Honors and awards: 2 Battle stars
- Fate: Sold for scrap, 16 July 1974

General characteristics
- Class & type: Haskell-class attack transport
- Displacement: 6,873 tons (lt), 14,837 t (fl)
- Length: 455 ft (139 m)
- Beam: 62 ft (19 m)
- Draft: 24 ft (7 m)
- Propulsion: 1 × geared turbine, 2 × header-type boilers, 1 × propeller, designed 8,500 shp (6,338 kW)
- Speed: 17 knots (31 km/h; 20 mph)
- Boats & landing craft carried: 2 × LCM; 12 × LCVP; 3 × LCPL
- Capacity: Troops: 86 officers, 1,475 enlisted; Cargo: 150,000 cu ft, 2,900 tons
- Complement: 56 officers, 480 enlisted
- Armament: 1 × 5"/38 dual-purpose gun; 4 × twin 40mm guns; 10 × single 20mm guns; late armament, add 1 × 40mm quad mount

USS Hinsdale (APA-120) was a Haskell-class attack transport in service with the United States Navy from 1944 to 1946. She was scrapped in 1974.

== History ==
Hinsdale was built and used during World War II and was of the VC2-S-AP5 Victory ship design type and was named for Hinsdale County, Colorado. She was launched by the California Shipbuilding Corporation, Wilmington, Los Angeles, 22 July 1944; sponsored by Mrs. M. B. Harper; and commissioned 15 October 1944.

=== Iwo Jima ===
After shakedown in the San Diego-San Pedro area, the new attack transport sailed for the Pacific, reaching Pearl Harbor 12 December with 175 passengers. The war in the Pacific was steadily advancing across the ocean toward the Japanese home islands, and on 27 December 1944 Hinsdale embarked some 1,200 marines for the Iwo Jima invasion, a prelude to the invasion of Japan herself. Acting as flagship for Transport Division 44, she spent nearly a month of intensive practice-landings in preparation for the assault. Hinsdale sailed from Hawaii 27 January 1945, pausing at Saipan to join a huge transport flotilla, and arrived off Iwo Jima's rock bound heights at dawn on D-Day, 19 February.

Hinsdale's leatherneck passengers swarmed ashore with the first wave of the invasion forces, and she remained in the Iwo Jima area over a week embarking and disembarking troops and valuable cargo. Some of her most important work was as an auxiliary hospital ship, caring for the seriously wounded. Disembarking troops, offloading cargo, and tending the injured all took place under continuous mortar and artillery fire from well-entrenched Japanese shore batteries, but Hinsdale had only one close call. On the morning of 25 February, a projectile burst close aboard the transport, killing a Marine captain standing on deck and wounding several others. On 27 February, Hinsdale sailed from Iwo Jima, stopping at Saipan for fuel, and reached Guam 3 March to disembark 166 casualties.

=== Okinawa ===
The Pacific war neared its climax. Hinsdale had only a brief rest at Guam before returning to Saipan 9 March to embark troops for the upcoming invasion of Okinawa, the largest amphibious operation of the Pacific war. With nearly 1,500 combat-bound marines and sailors on board, she again spent long hours in practice for the landings. On 27 March 1945 Hinsdale left Saipan to take her place in the Battle of OkinawaJoint Expeditionary Force-1,213 ships loaded with over a half million troops, headed for Okinawa. Sunday 1 April 1945, D-Day for Okinawa, was very nearly Hinsdale's last day in the Pacific. As she steamed toward the transport area through the pre-dawn blackness, marines already on deck and ready to disembark, Hinsdale's lookouts spotted an enemy plane skimming low over the water. With only a few seconds warning, Hinsdale could not evade the kamikaze; at 0600 the suicide plane crashed into her port side just above the water line and ripped into the engine room. Three explosions rocked the troop-laden transport as the kamikaze's bombs exploded deep inside her and tore the engine room apart; only one member of the watch survived death by scalding steam from the exploding boilers. The deck-log (page 215) of the Hinsdale has the following account: "0549 in a position about 12 miles south-southeast of the southern tip of Okinawa the ship was hit amidships on the port side and two explosions at intervals of about one second were felt. Later investigation indicated that a Jap suicide plane, probably a Tony Kawasaki Ki-61 carrying three 132 lb. bombs hit the ship on the port side at the water line in the vicinity of frame 80. The ship was holed in three places: A seven foot hole in the engine room at the water line caused by the engine and fuselage to which it is believed was attached a bomb which was the first explosion, a ten inch hole in the engine room about 2 feet above the water line caused by a bomb which was later discovered as a dud, and a four foot hole in Compartment A-304-EL a crew's berthing space, caused by a bomb which was the second explosion."

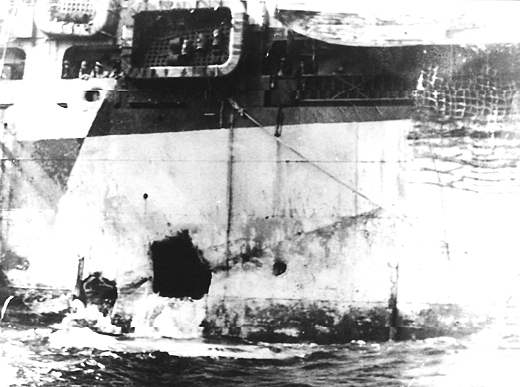
kamikaze damage aboard Hinsdale, inflicted 1 April 1945.

Power failed immediately; lights and internal communication, so vital to damage control parties, were gone. Hinsdale came to a dead stop in the water, with three gaping holes in her port side. Marines on deck who had been ready to disembark were hastily shifted to the starboard rails to counteract a serious list to port. Below decks Hinsdale's crew were groping through the smoke-filled darkness to fight fires started by the kamikaze and to jury-rig patches. Fifteen men were dead; 40 missing or wounded. Despite the injury Hinsdale carried out her job to put the marines ashore. First Class Metalsmith James O. Perry saw the kamikaze plane approaching and cleared the topside of marines and sailors, saving many lives; in reward he was given the Type 94, Nambu pistol (SN 58787) the Japanese pilot was carrying.

Limited power was finally restored through an auxiliary diesel engine; the dangerous list to port of 13 degrees corrected; the ship taken in tow by ATR-80 at an agonizing 5 knots, for Kerama Retto, some 20 miles away. Emergency repair work began immediately amidst continued kamikaze attacks; Hinsdale exacted some revenge by assisting in the kill of at least two of the suicide craft. Her cargo, mainly equipment and stores needed by the Marines was shifted to USS Pitt (APA-223), and then Hinsdale was pressed into service as a receiving ship for survivors of other kamikaze victims.

On 14 April she departed Kerama Rotta, towed by USS Leo (AKA-60) in a convoy of LSTs. Sailing slowly the convoy reached Ulithi 23 April; there Hinsdale, after a month of intensive work by repair ship USS Vulcan (AR-5), was ready for sea, and on 20 May sailed for the US.

=== Operation "Magic Carpet" ===
Hinsdale put into the Brooklyn Navy Yard 2 July 1945 for a complete overhaul. While she was there undergoing repairs, the Japanese surrendered, but Hinsdale was destined to make one last Pacific voyage. Departing 21 November, to participate in operation "Magic Carpet," the return of Pacific veterans, she sailed via Pearl Harbor to Sasebo and Nagasaki, embarked over a thousand troops and reached San Francisco 24 January 1946. Thence she sailed to Norfolk Navy Yard arriving on 20 February, was decommissioned 8 April 1946, returned to the United States Maritime Commission for disposal 12 April, and her name stricken from the Naval Vessel Register 1 May 1946. Hinsdale was subsequently placed in the National Defense Reserve Fleet and was berthed in the James River near Norfolk.

=== Fate ===
In 1955 Hinsdale was withdrawn from the Reserve Fleet as part of a Repair Program, GAA-Stockard, and then returned. On 16 July 1974 she was sold to B. V. Intershitra, for $731,150, to be scrapped. At 1015 EDT, on 11 September 1974 she was withdrawn from the Reserve Fleet and sent to the breaker's yard.

All that remains of Hinsdale is her brass builder's plate.

== Awards ==
Hinsdale received two battle stars for World War II service.
