= USS Aquarius =

WWII US attack cargo ship

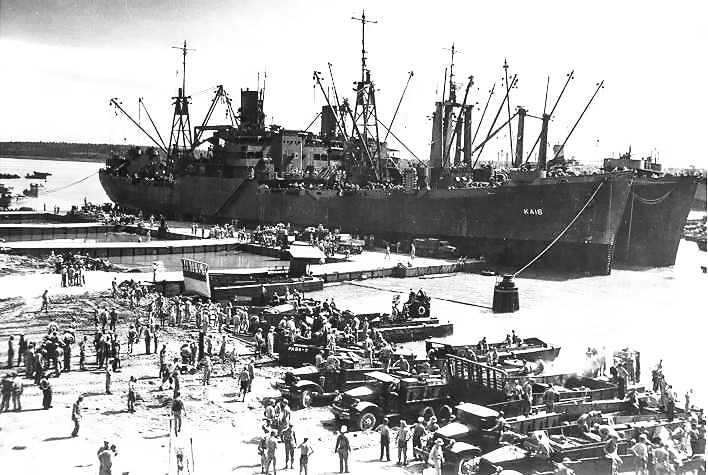
- USS Aquarius

History

United States
- Name: USS Aquarius
- Namesake: The constellation Aquarius
- Builder: Federal Shipbuilding and Drydock Co.
- Laid down: 28 April 1943
- Launched: 23 July 1943
- Commissioned: 21 August 1943
- Decommissioned: 23 May 1946
- Stricken: 13 November 1946
- Fate: Sold on 12 February 1947
- Notes: First to land on Leyte after the bombardment. The Battle of Leyte arguably the largest battle in naval history.

General characteristics
- Class & type: Andromeda-class attack cargo ship
- Displacement: 14,200 tons
- Length: 459 ft 3 in (140 m)
- Beam: 63 ft (19.2 m)
- Draft: 26 ft 4 in (8.0 m)
- Speed: 16.5 knots (31 km/h)
- Complement: 404
- Armament: 1 × 5 in (130 mm)/38 caliber dual-purpose gun mount, 4 × 3 in (76 mm) gun mounts, 2 dcp.

USS Aquarius (AKA-16) was an Andromeda-class attack cargo ship in the service of the United States Navy. She was named after the constellation Aquarius. She was one of a handful of World War II AKAs manned by officers and crew from the United States Coast Guard. She served as a commissioned ship for 2 years and 9 months.

== History ==
Aquarius (AKA-16) was laid down under a Maritime Commission contract (MC hull 205) on 28 April 1943 at Kearny, N.J., by the Federal Shipbuilding and Drydock Co.; launched on 23 July 1943; sponsored by Mrs. Edmund E. Brady Jr.; acquired by the Navy on 20 August 1943; and commissioned on 21 August 1943, Capt. R. V. Marron, USCG, in command.

Manned by a Coast Guard crew, she conducted brief shakedown training in Chesapeake Bay and sailed on 15 September via the Panama Canal to the west coast. Reaching San Francisco on 19 October, she loaded cargo and embarked passengers for transportation to Hawaii. She reached Pearl Harbor on 28 October and then returned to San Diego where she reported for duty to the 5th Amphibious Force, Pacific Fleet, and was assigned to Transport Division 24. Following a repair period lasting until 25 November, she embarked Marines and got underway for amphibious training exercises off the California coast.

On 4 January 1944, she sailed for Hawaii. She joined Task Force (TF) 53 at Pearl Harbor and sortied on 22 January for the invasion of the Marshall Islands. She stood into the transport area off Roi and Namur Islands, Kwajalein Atoll, on 31 January and from then until 6 February, unloaded her cargo and disembarked troops. On 10 February, she arrived at Funafuti, Ellice Islands, where she joined the 3d Fleet. During the remainder of February and into early March, she operated in the Solomon Islands conducting amphibious training exercises with Army troops. On 21 March, she moved to Nouméa, New Caledonia; loaded Army personnel and equipment; and took them to Emirau Island to serve as a garrison force. From Emirau, she embarked troops of the 4th Marine Regiment and took them back to Guadalcanal. Between 20 April and 28 April, she carried elements of the Army's 40th Division to Cape Gloucester, New Britain, and returned the 1st Marine Division to the Russell Islands.

Following repairs at Espiritu Santo, Aquarius returned to Guadalcanal to conduct rehearsals with the 3d Marine Division for the projected assault on the Marianas. On 4 June, she departed Guadalcanal with TF 53 and proceeded to Kwajalein, the staging base for the operation. This force had orders to act as a floating reserve during the Saipan landings and, when directed, to invade Guam. TF 53 sortied from Kwajalein on the 12th. However, the engagement with the Japanese Mobile Fleet in the Battle of the Philippine Sea and the unexpectedly fierce resistance of the Japanese garrison on Saipan caused the invasion of Guam to be postponed. After standing-by for over a fortnight, Aquarius and the other ships for TF 53 put into Eniwetok on 28 June to await further orders.

They sortied again on 17 July and reached Guam on 21 July. By 26 July, all of her cargo was unloaded, and she sailed for Eniwetok. From there, she proceeded on to Espiritu Santo, where she arrived on 6 August. After a week of provisioning, she moved to Guadalcanal. During the rest of August, she took part in training exercises for the assault on Peleliu. She got underway with TG 32.17 early in September and entered the transport area off Peleliu on 15 September. She remained in the area unloading cargo and receiving casualties from the beach until 22 September.

Aquarius then headed for Hollandia, New Guinea, where she arrived on 25 September. After embarking Army personnel for exercises in the Humboldt Bay area, she sortied on 13 October with TG 78.1 for the invasion of Leyte. On A-day, 20 October, she was anchored in San Pedro Bay and began unloading her cargo. She left the area the next day and returned to Hollandia, and made another run to Leyte in mid-November. By the end of November, she was at Aitape, New Guinea, to load more Army units. She sailed on 28 December with TG 78.1 to support the landings at Lingayen Gulf.

She reached the invasion area on 9 January 1945, completed unloading the next day, and retired to Leyte on 13 January. She took on cargo and personnel for the impending Zimbales-Subic Bay operations. She reached that area on 29 January and two days later was back in Leyte. Late in February, she proceeded via Hollandia to Guadalcanal and held training exercises off Guadalcanal until sailing for Ulithi on 15 March. On 27 March she sortied with Transport Division 36 for the assault on Okinawa.

Aquarius remained off Okinawa from 1 to 9 April, resupplying other ships. She got underway again on the latter day; called at Saipan on 13 April; Pearl Harbor on 26 April; and arrived at Seattle, Wash., on 4 May to begin overhaul.

The yard period ended on 12 July, and she conducted refresher training off the west coast. While she was still in Californian waters Japan capitulated. She departed San Diego on 18 August, arrived at Guam on 4 September, and moved to Saipan three days later to load cargo and troops for use in the occupation of Japan. On 23 September, she anchored in the harbor of Nagasaki to begin unloading. Departing Japan on 26 September, she proceeded to Mindoro and Manila Bay, Philippines. On 23 October, she sailed from Manila with TG 78.7 bound for Hong Kong. During the next two months, she shuttled Chinese troops and supplies between Hong Kong, Qinhuangdao, and Qingdao. She returned to Seattle on 13 December.

She remained on the west coast until February 1946, then proceeded to New York where she was placed out of commission on 23 May. She was turned over to the War Shipping Administration on 12 September, and her name was struck from the Navy list on 13 November 1946. She was subsequently sold to U.S. Lines on 12 February 1947.

Aquarius earned eight battle stars for her World War II service.
