= USS Capricornus =

Cargo ship of the United States Navy

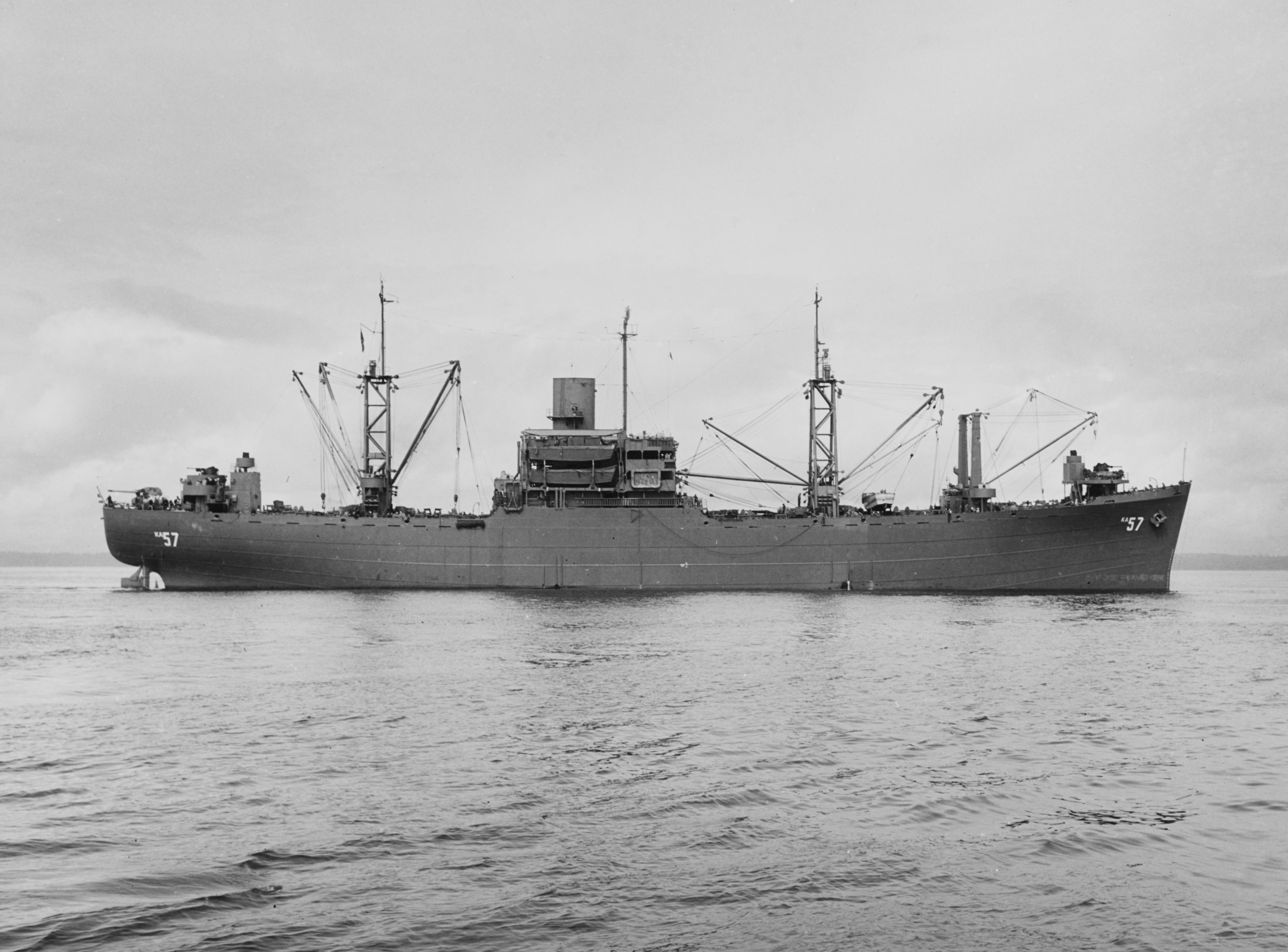
- USS Capricornus (AKA-57) circa in 1945

History

United States
- Name: USS Capricornus
- Namesake: The constellation Capricornus
- Builder: Moore Dry Dock Company, Oakland, California
- Launched: 14 August 1943
- Commissioned: 31 May 1944
- Decommissioned: 30 March 1948
- Recommissioned: 12 October 1950
- Decommissioned: 10 February 1970
- Reclassified: LKA-57, 1 January 1969
- Stricken: 1 January 1977
- Honours and awards: 4 battle stars (World War II)
- Fate: Scrapped, 1985

General characteristics
- Class & type: Andromeda-class attack cargo ship
- Type: Type C2-S-B1
- Displacement: 6,830 long tons (6,940 t)
- Length: 459 ft 2 in (139.95 m)
- Beam: 63 ft (19 m)
- Draft: 26 ft 4 in (8.03 m)
- Speed: 16 knots (30 km/h; 18 mph)
- Complement: 429
- Armament: 1 × 5"/38 caliber gun mount

USS Capricornus (AKA-57/LKA-57) was an Andromeda-class attack cargo ship named after the zodiacal constellation Capricornus.

Capricornus (AKA-57) was launched on 14 August 1943 as Spitfire by Moore Dry Dock Co., Oakland, California, under a Maritime Commission contract, sponsored by Mrs. J. E. Mock, acquired by the Navy on 25 November 1943, placed in partial commission the same day, decommissioned on 29 November 1943, and converted by Willamette Iron and Steel Works, Portland, Oregon, and commissioned in full on 31 May 1944.

== Service history ==
=== 1944–1948 ===
Capricornus made two voyages to carry cargo between San Pedro, California, and Hilo, Hawaii, from 22 July to 19 August 1944, then sailed by way of Eniwetok and Manus for the invasion of Leyte. Cruising with the Southern Attack Force, she entered the Gulf uneventfully, began landing her cargo in the first landings on 20 October, and worked furiously under enemy air attack to complete unloading and withdraw. Safely underway on 24 October, she withdrew to Hollandia, then sailed to Wakde, where she loaded Army reinforcements. As she steamed north to bring her reinforcements to Leyte, there were several air raid alerts on 13 November, and Capricornus joined in splashing the lone torpedo plane which attacked her group. She returned from Leyte to Manus 19 November to take part in rehearsals for the invasion of Lingayen Gulf.

Clearing Manus in TF 79's Attack Group "Baker" for Lingayen, Capricornus with her group came under desperate enemy air attack at sunset on 8 January 1945, when a kamikaze severely damaged Kitkun Bay (CVE-71). As scattered individual enemy aircraft continued to attack, Capricornus' guns joined in driving them away. The landings took place on schedule on 9 January, although sporadic attacks by Japanese aircraft and small ships continued. Just before sunrise the next day, Capricornus was straddled by two bombs close aboard, spraying her with shrapnel, but no serious damage was inflicted. Capricornus returned to Leyte Gulf on 13 January and continued to support Philippine operations, landing troops and equipment at San Antonio on 26 January, and servicing landing craft. She sailed out of Leyte Gulf on 27 March, bound for the beaches of Okinawa.

In the grey dawn of 1 April 1945, Capricornus arrived at the invasion scene, laden primarily with ammunition. For the next eight days, her men labored to deliver her priority cargo, while manning anti-aircraft guns almost continually as furious Japanese air attacks were hurled at the invasion forces. Night retirements, and days off the beaches were the rule until 9 April, when she cleared for Seattle, Washington, and overhaul.

Capricornus sailed from San Francisco on 2 June 1945 with cargo for Eniwetok, Guam, and Espiritu Santo, at which island she heard the word of Japanese surrender. Carrying occupation troops, she stood in to Nagasaki on 23 September, then sailed to Manila and Hong Kong to load Chinese troops for the reoccupation of Northern China. Similar support of the occupation continued until 11 December when she arrived at Seattle.

Between 8 February 1946 and 2 November 1947, Capricornus carried cargo on four voyages to the Far East, and on 16 November sailed for Norfolk, Virginia. Here she was placed out of commission in reserve on 30 March 1948.

=== 1950–1970 ===
With the expansion of the fleet dictated by the outbreak of the Korean War, Capricornus was recommissioned on 12 October 1950. Through 1960, she operated from Norfolk in training and exercises in Chesapeake Bay and in the Caribbean, along with five periodic deployments to the Mediterranean for service with the 6th Fleet. Notable in her operations were her rescue and salvage assistance to the burning radar picket Searcher (YAGR-4) on 13 November 1955, followed by the difficult towing of the rescued ship to Brooklyn for repairs. In July 1958, Capricornus supported the landing of Marines in Lebanon which forestalled a serious Middle Eastern eruption.

=== Decommissioning and disposal ===
Capricornus was redesignated LKA-57 on 1 January 1969, and decommissioned on 10 February 1970. Transferred to the custody of the Maritime Administration the ship was laid up in the National Defense Reserve Fleet, at James River, Virginia. Struck from the Naval Vessel Register on 1 January 1977, she was reported scrapped in Spain on 16 May 1985.

== Awards ==
Capricornus received four battle stars for World War II service.
