= USS Sheliak =

Cargo ship of the United States Navy

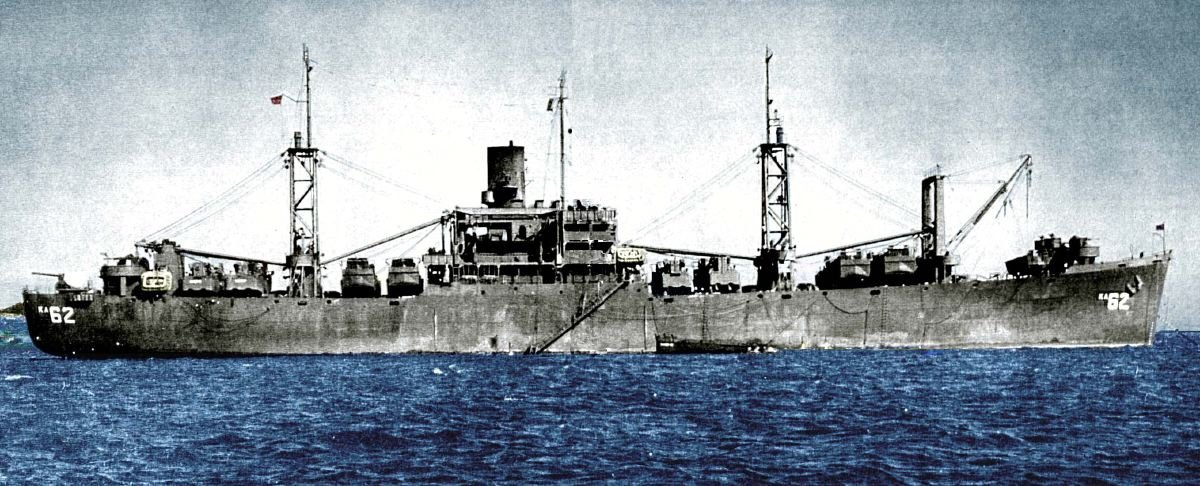

History

United States
- Name: USS Sheliak
- Namesake: The star Sheliak in the constellation Lyra
- Builder: Federal Shipbuilding and Drydock Company, Kearny, New Jersey
- Laid down: 19 June 1944
- Launched: 17 October 1944
- Commissioned: 1 December 1944
- Decommissioned: 10 May 1946
- Stricken: 21 May 1946
- Honours and awards: 1 battle star (World War II)
- Fate: Sold into commercial service, 1948; Scrapped, 1969

General characteristics
- Class & type: Andromeda-class attack cargo ship
- Type: Type C2-S-B1
- Displacement: 6,715 long tons (6,823 t)
- Length: 459 ft 2 in (139.95 m)
- Beam: 63 ft (19 m)
- Draft: 26 ft 4 in (8.03 m)
- Speed: 16.5 knots (30.6 km/h; 19.0 mph)
- Complement: 399
- Armament: 1 × 5"/38 caliber gun mount; 4 × twin 40 mm gun mounts; 18 × 20 mm gun mounts

USS Sheliak (AKA-62) was an Andromeda-class attack cargo ship in service with the United States Navy from 1944 to 1946. In 1948, she was sold into commercial service and was scrapped in 1969.

== History ==
Sheliak (AKA-62) was named after Beta Lyrae, a binary star system in the constellation Lyra. She was laid down on 19 June 1944 under Maritime Commission contract (MC hull 214) by the Federal Shipbuilding and Drydock Co., Kearny, N.J.; launched on 17 October 1944; sponsored by Mrs. Nellie Blanch Regan; and commissioned on 1 December 1944. She was one of a handful of AKA's crewed by the Coast Guard.

=== Pacific War ===
Sheliak arrived in Hampton Roads on 14 December 1944 and underwent shakedown training there from 15 to 21 December. After repairs at Norfolk, Virginia, she arrived at Bayonne, New Jersey, on 28 December to load cargo for the Pacific. Departing Bayonne on 4 January 1945, Sheliak delivered her cargo to Pearl Harbor on 25 January. From 2 to 5 February, she underwent training at Pearl Harbor; and, from 5 to 13 February, she received 1,827 tons of Tenth Army equipment, plus other cargo and 201 troops. Departing Pearl Harbor on 15 February, Sheliak arrived at Tulagi on 25 February and underwent pre-invasion training there. Departing Tulagi on 15 March, she arrived at Ulithi on the 21st and sailed from there for the Okinawa invasion on 27 March. Sheliak arrived off the beach at Okinawa on 1 April; and, for the first seven days, provided cargo on call to troops ashore. After general unloading was ordered, she put the Tenth Army cargo ashore between 8 and 17 April. During these operations, she shot down one Japanese aircraft on 15 April.

Sheliak departed Okinawa on 19 April; and, sailing via Ulithi and Pearl Harbor, arrived at San Francisco on 14 May. There, her crew altered her cargo spaces to carry ammunition; and, between 28 May and 5 July, she made two round-trips carrying ammunition from Port Chicago, California to Pearl Harbor. She was unloading her third cargo of ammunition at Pearl Harbor when the Pacific War ended, and she returned the ammunition still on board to San Francisco. On 1 October, the cargo ship delivered 18 landing craft to Monterey, California; and, on 15 October, she sailed from San Francisco with general cargo and passengers for various Pacific bases. She called at Pearl Harbor, Manus, Samar, Subic Bay, and Guam before returning to San Francisco on 22 February 1946. On 15 March, she sailed from San Francisco and arrived at Norfolk, Virginia, on 3 April for deactivation.

=== Decommissioning and fate ===
Sheliak was decommissioned on 10 May 1946, transferred to the War Shipping Administration the following day, and struck from the Navy List on 21 May. Sold into mercantile service as SS Pioneer Isle in 1948, she was renamed Australian Isle in 1965 and Transluna in 1969 before being scrapped later that year.

== Awards ==
Sheliak received one Battle Star for her World War II service.
