= USS Whitfield =

Cargo ship of the United States Navy

USS Whitfield (AKA-111) was an Andromeda class attack cargo ship whose construction was cancelled due to the end of World War II. She was named after Whitfield County, Georgia.

The ship was scheduled to be built for the U.S. Navy under a Maritime Commission contract (MC hull 2898) by the Federal Shipbuilding and Drydock Co., of Kearny, N.J. However, due to the end of the war in the Pacific, the contract for her construction was cancelled on 27 August 1945 before her keel was laid down.
