= SS Golden Bear =

SS Golden Bear has been the name of at least three merchant ships:

- SS Golden Bear was the former SS West Cajoot, a Design 1013 cargo ship built in 1919. She was renamed Golden Bear in 1928, before being renamed Kailua in 1937, Vyborg in 1942, and was destroyed in an explosion in 1947.
- SS Golden Bear was a LASH carrier built for Pacific Far East Lines in 1971. She was sold to American President Lines and renamed General Grant in 1979, resold to Matson Lines in 1996 and renamed Chief Gadao, and sold for scrapping in 2006.
- SS Golden Bear was a Type C4-class ship a type C4-S-1f, converted by Todd San Pedro for Pacific Far East Lines Inc. as a cargo ship. Built as the Beaver Mariner in 1953 by Bethlehem.

In addition, three ships of the California State University Maritime Academy have been named Golden Bear, the traditional name for the training ship of the university:

- USS Mellena was Golden Bear between 1946 and 1971.
- USS Crescent City was Golden Bear between 1971 and 1995.
- USNS Maury has been Golden Bear since 1995.

== See also ==
- Golden Bear (disambiguation)
