= Golden Bear (disambiguation) =

The Golden Bear is the top prize at the Berlin International Film Festival.

Golden Bear may also refer to:

== Animals ==
- California golden bear (Ursus arctos californicus), an extinct subspecies of the brown bear
- The Golden Bear (legend), recalled in legends and stories of American Old West.

== Sports ==
=== Team name or mascot ===
- Alberta Golden Bears, men's sports teams at the University of Alberta
- California Golden Bears, nickname for teams of the University of California, Berkeley
- Concordia University (Saint Paul, Minnesota)
- Kutztown University of Pennsylvania
- Shelbyville Senior High School, Shelbyville, Indiana
- Upper Arlington High School, Upper Arlington, Ohio
- Upper Moreland High School, Upper Moreland, Pennsylvania
- Vestal High School, Vestal, New York
- West Virginia University Institute of Technology
- Western New England University

=== Competitions ===
- Golden Bear of Zagreb, a figure skating competition

== Other ==
- A nickname for Jack Nicklaus
- SS Golden Bear, one of several merchant ships
- TS Golden Bear, a training vessel of the California Maritime Academy
- Golden Bear (band), a rock band from Austin, TX
- The Golden Bear (nightclub), a nightclub in Huntington Beach, California
- A line of ammunition made by the Barnaul Cartridge Plant

== See also ==
- Goldie & Bear
