= Design 1099 ship =

World War I steel-hulled cargo ship design

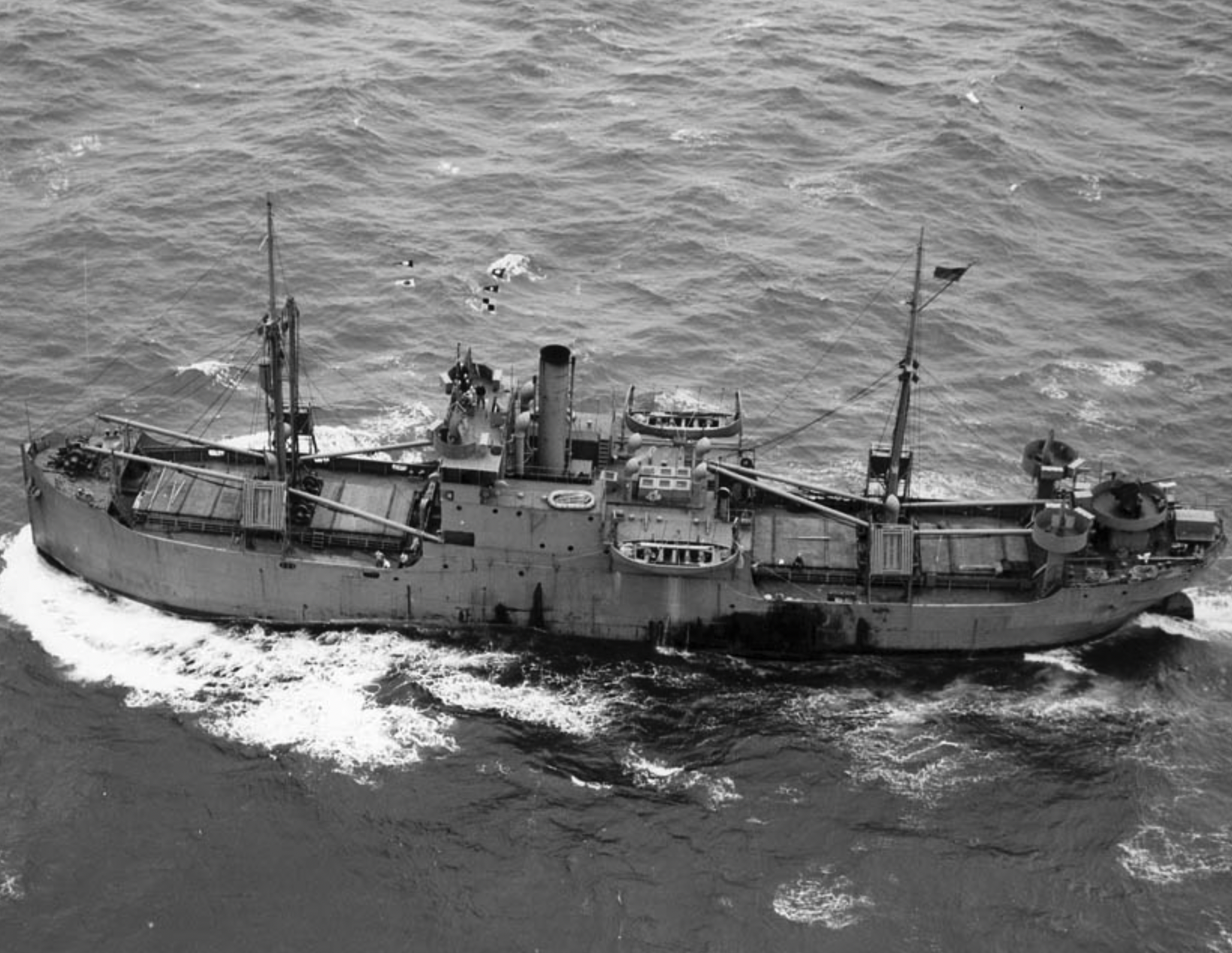
- USAT Norlago in 1943, a design 1099 freighter originally named Fargo

Class overview
- Name: EFC Design 1099
- Completed: 91

General characteristics
- Type: Cargo ship
- Tonnage: 2,606 GRT; 1,612 NRT; 4,050 DWT
- Length: 251 ft (77 m)
- Beam: 43 ft 6 in (13.26 m)
- Draft: 24 ft 2 in (7.37 m)
- Propulsion: Oil-fired triple-expansion steam engine

The Emergency Fleet Corporation Design 1099 was a steel-hulled cargo ship design approved for mass production by the United States Shipping Board's Emergency Fleet Corporation in World War I. A total of 91 of these ships were produced. Of these, 88 were purchased by the Shipping Board. The remaining three were cancelled by the Shipping Board, but completed for private companies.

The design 1099 ships became part of a global glut of shipping capacity in the 1920s, after the war's demands subsided. Many of them were idled, two dozen were scrapped, and most of the remainder were sold to cargo fleets around the world by the Shipping Board. By the beginning of World War II they were very widespread and carried critical materials for all the major combatants. Twenty-five of the ships were sunk by enemy action during the war. The last of the class was likely wrecked in 1958.

== Construction ==
Design 1099 ships were referred to as "Lakers" since all were produced in shipyards on the Great Lakes, and most were named after lakes. Production was spread over eight shipyards:

- American Ship Building Company, Cleveland, Ohio shipyard (9 ships)
- American Ship Building Company, Lorain, Ohio shipyard (13 ships)
- American Ship Building Company, Superior, Wisconsin shipyard (6 ships)
- Buffalo Drydock Company, Buffalo, New York shipyard (1 ship)
- Chicago Shipbuilding Company, Chicago, Illinois shipyard (7 ships)
- Detroit Shipbuilding Company, Detroit, Michigan shipyard (24 ships)
- McDougall Duluth Company, Duluth, Minnesota shipyard (15 ships)
- Toledo Shipbuilding Company, Toledo, Ohio shipyard (16 ships)

All 91 ships were completed in 1919 and 1920. Costs varied slightly among design 1099 ships. For example, Bartholomew cost $781,925.46, while Detroit Wayne cost $777,751.41.

== Characteristics ==
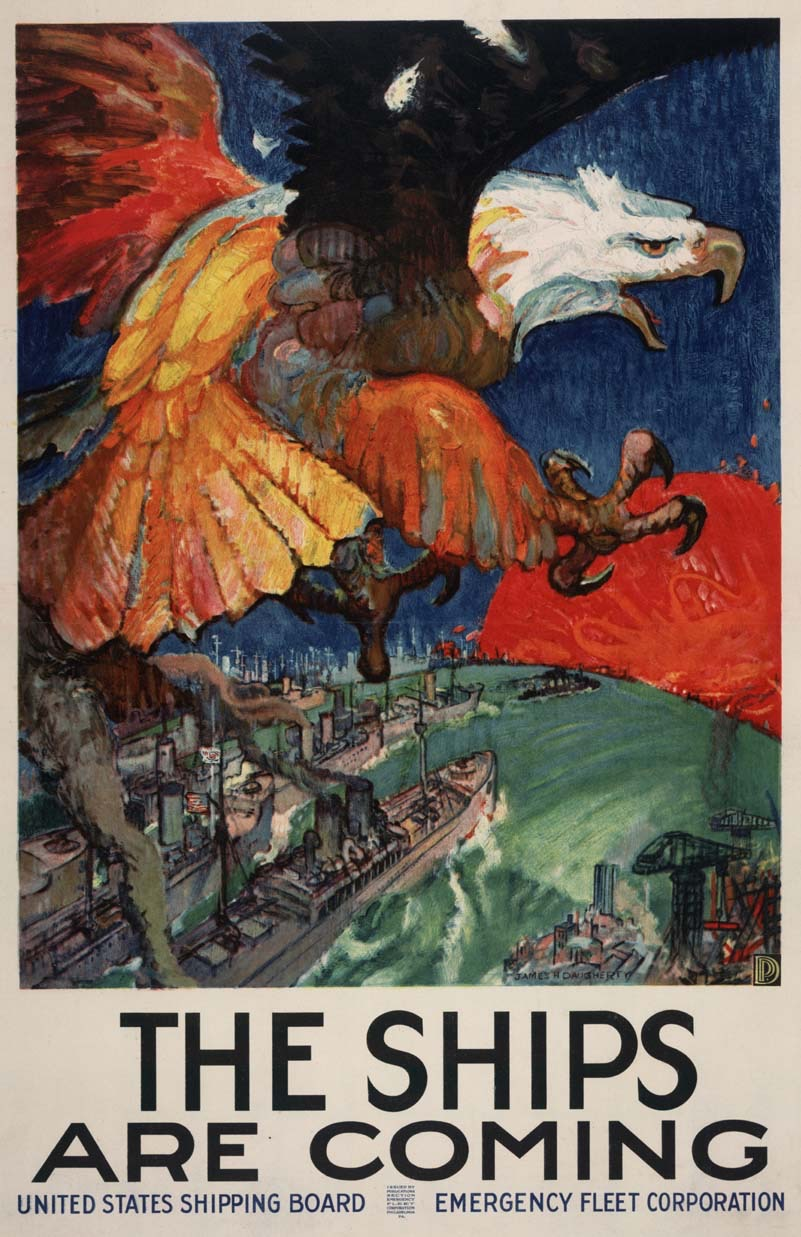
The Emergency Fleet Corporation commissioned 88 design 1099 ships

Design 1099 ships were built of steel plates riveted together. They were 251 feet (77 m) long between perpendiculars, with a beam of 43 feet 6 inches (13.26 m), and a depth of hold of 28 feet 2 inches (8.59 m). Their fully loaded draft was just over 24 feet (7.3 m). Deadweight tonnage, the weight of cargo which could be carried, varied among ships between 4,000 and 4,155 tons. Gross register tonnage varied between 2,542 and 2,810, while net register tonnage varied between 1,512 and 1,704.

All design 1099 ships had a single propeller which was driven by a single triple-expansion steam engine creating 1,425 indicated horsepower (1,063 kW). Two slightly different engine configurations were built. One had high, medium, and low-pressure cylinders with diameters of 22, 36, and 59 inches, and the other 21, 35, and 59 inches. Both types had a stroke of 42 inches. Steam was provided by two oil-fired boilers, except on Lake Farlin which burned coal. The ships were capable of reaching 9.5 knots (17.6 km/h; 10.9 mph). Their fuel tanks could hold between 664 and 708 tons of oil, giving them a steaming range of about 8,000 nautical miles (15,000 km; 9,200 mi).

There were two cargo holds, each of which had two hatches. Each hold was serviced with four cargo booms, each of which had its own winch. The heaviest load that could be winched aboard was 4 tons. Depending on the type of cargo and the ship, design 1099 freighters had between 166,806 and 183,153 cubic feet (4,723.4 and 5,186.3 m^{3}) of effective cargo space.

The design 1099 ships that were pressed into service by various governments during World War II were armed variously. USAT City of Houston, launched as Lake Strymon, was armed with a 3-inch gun on the stern and four 20 mm Oerlikon anti-aircraft guns, two on the stern and two on top of the pilothouse.

== Class history ==
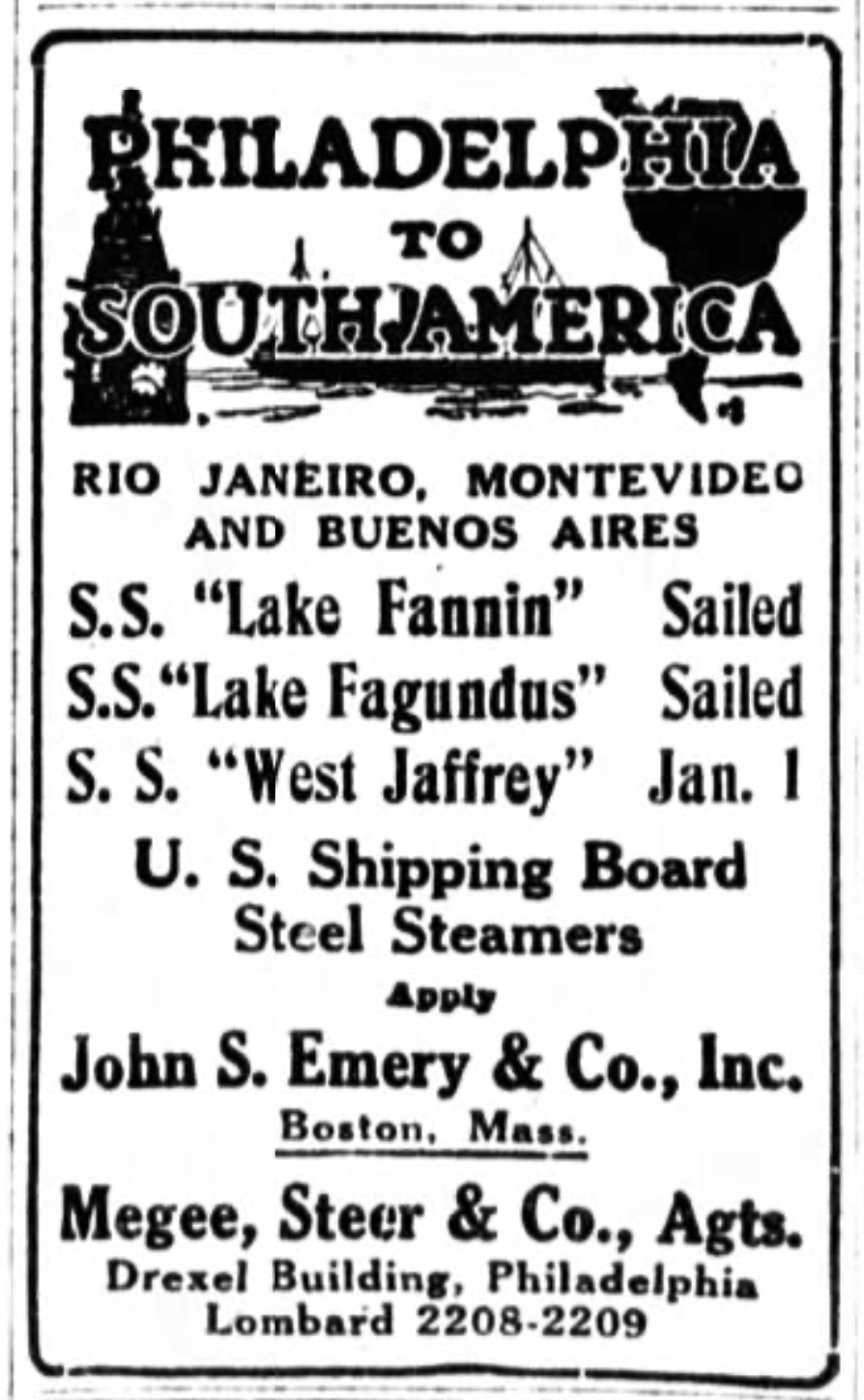
1920 advertisement for design 1099 ships Lake Fannin and Lake Fagundus

Completed in 1919 and 1920, the design 1099 class arrived too late to make a difference in World War I. Instead of solving the problem of ship scarcity during the war, it became part of a ship surplus after the war. In 1919 the Shipping Board adopted a policy of selling its steel ships to American companies to strengthen the private sector of the industry. Congress passed the Merchant Marine Act of 1920, which advocated a strong merchant marine on both national defense and international commerce grounds. The law authorized the Shipping Board to operate, charter, and sell ships to support a strong American merchant marine, and to dispose of excess ships which it deemed unnecessary for a strong merchant marine. Sales of ships to foreigners were allowed, but only if the Shipping Board was unable to sell them to Americans.

Shipping Board design 1099 ships were operated by American companies briefly after the end of World War I. They sailed all over the world, Lake Fansdale to Le Havre, and Lake Faulk to Hong Kong, for example. Then, in the spring of 1920, ocean shipping rates collapsed, in part because of the overproduction of shipping during the war. Many design 1099 ships were idled because they were small and slow compared to much of the merchant marine fleet. By 1923 the shipping board declared that its two paramount objectives were to create a strong privately owned merchant marine, and to dispose of as many ships in its own fleet as possible consistent with that end.

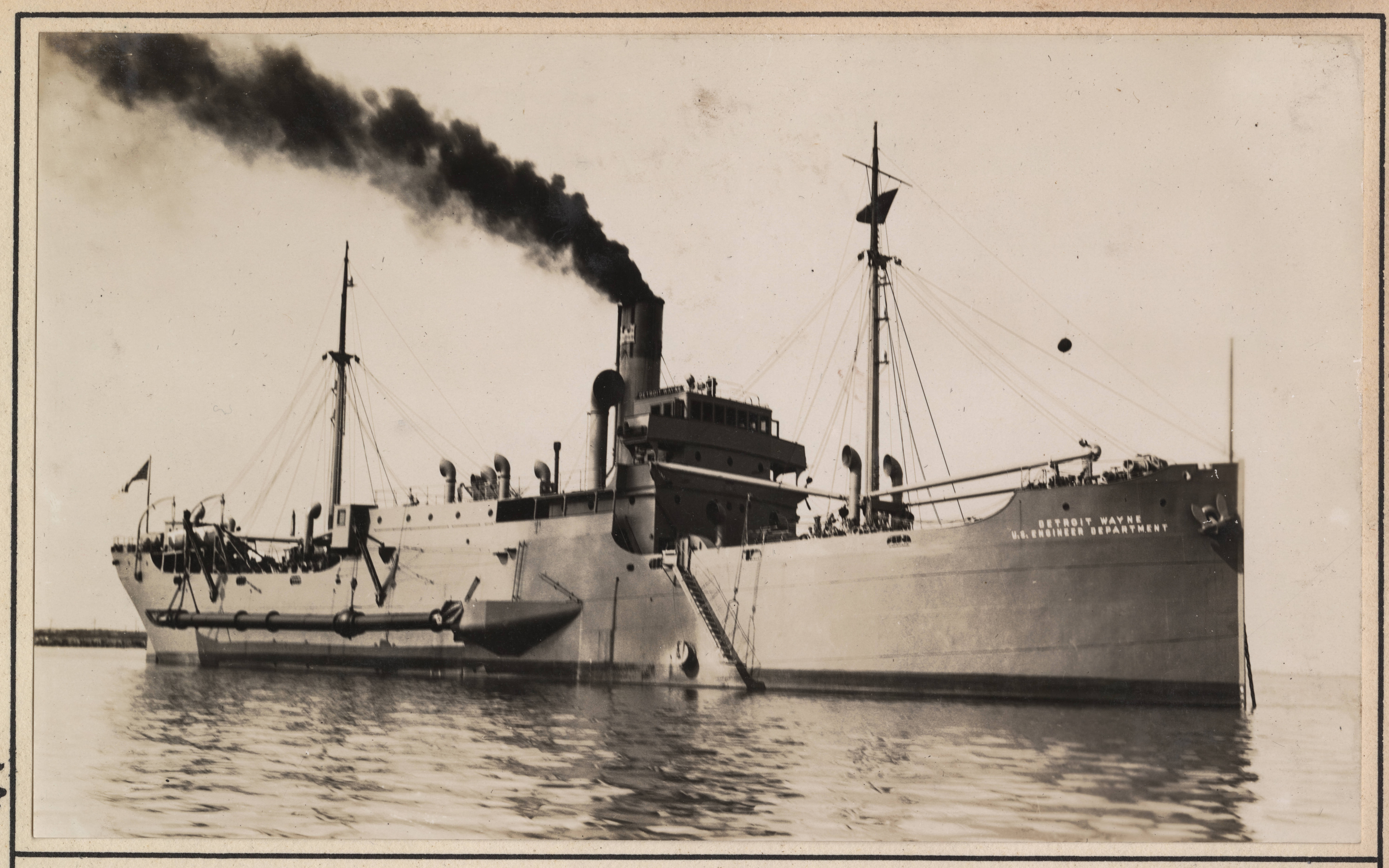
U.S.E.D. Detroit Wayne, a design 1099 freighter converted into a suction dredge by the Army Corps of Engineers

The Shipping Board began selling design 1099 ships to American companies in 1922. By 1926, it found qualified American buyers for 48. President Coolidge addressed the Shipping Board fleet in his 1927 state of the union speech. By that time, he and many others judged "Public operation [of the merchant marine] not a success," because it was a constant drain on the U.S. treasury, and often protected private interests, rather than the public good. Coolidge's view was that the ships should be sold as quickly as possible. As the ships lost value as they aged and as political pressure grew, the Shipping Board began selling design 1099 ships not just to American merchant marine firms, but for scrap metal and to foreign buyers. An additional 24 ships were sold in this manner. The Shipping Board sold 72 of its 88 design 1099 ships in the decade after it began the process.

Some design 1099 ships were transferred to other government entities, rather than being sold to private interests. Henry County became California State, the training ship for the California Maritime Academy. Lake Fairfax, Detroit Wayne, Lake Fenn, and Lake Faxon were transferred to the War Department. In 1932, Lake Fairfax was converted into a suction dredge using parts from Lake Faxon, and Detroit Wayne became a suction dredge using parts from Lake Fenn. The two dredges went to work for the US Army Corps of Engineers on the Mississippi River, while the two parts ships were scrapped.

United States Shipping Board sales of design 1099 ships 1922-1931
| Year | To US Companies | To Foreign Companies | For Scrap | Total |
|---|---|---|---|---|
| 1922 | Lake Fariston, Vinton County, Lake Florian, Lake Flournoy, Lake Filbert | | | 5 |
| 1923 | Lake Fannie, Lake Gebhart, Lake Gera, Lake Gilboa, Lake Fackler, Lake Flattery, Lake Strymon, Lake Fillmore, Pulaski | | | 9 |
| 1924 | Lake Felden, Lake Tippah, Lake Flambeau, La Crosse, Lake Fillion | | | 5 |
| 1925 | Bartholomew, Lake Faulk, Lake Fergus, Lake Farmingdale, Lake Farrar, Lake Fernando, Lake Getaway, Lake Gilpen, Lake Giltedge, Lake Gitano, Lake Fairport, Lake Treba, Lake Flanders, Lake Floravista | Lake Fife | Lake Farlin | 16 |
| 1926 | Lake Farber, Lake Fanquier, Lake Fedora, Lake Falama, Lake Giddings, Lake Fabyan, Lake Inglenook, Hancock County, Lake Falun, Lake Flagstaff, Lake Flatonia, Great Falls, Rushville, Union Liberty | Lake Faribault | | 15 |
| 1927 | | | | |
| 1928 | Lake Festus | | | 1 |
| 1929 | | Lake Farley, Lake Fansdale, Lake Favonia, Lake Fandon, Lake Festina | Lake Fanbush | 6 |
| 1930 | | Lake Ferrona, Lake Fablus | Lake Farragut, Lake Gazette, Lake Gert, Sioux Falls, Lake Fibre, Lake Figart, Lake Fighting | 9 |
| 1931 | | | Lake Farabee, Franklin County, Lake Geyser, Lake Gilta, Lake Fagundus, McCreary County | 6 |

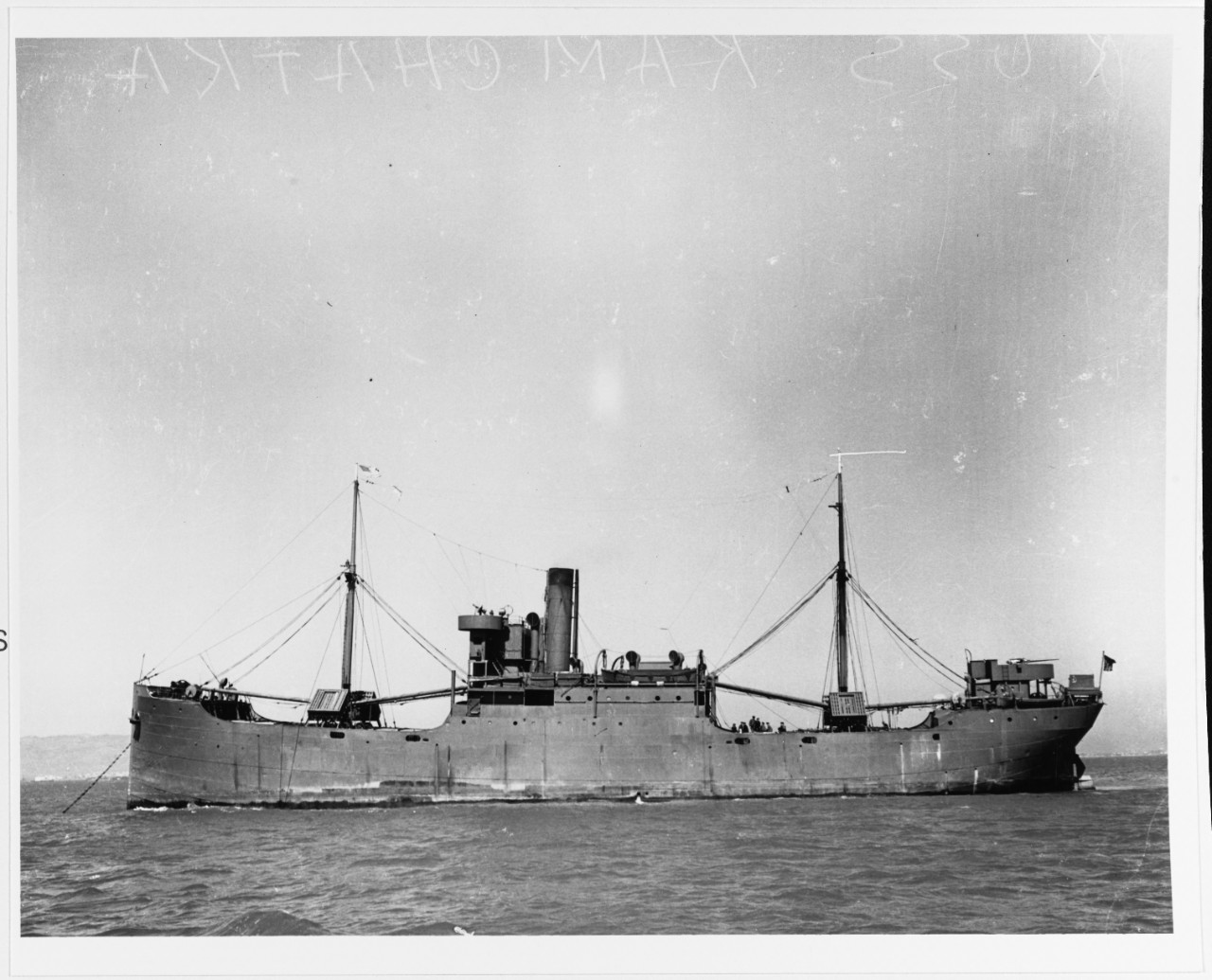
Soviet freighter Kamchatneft, launched as Lake Filson

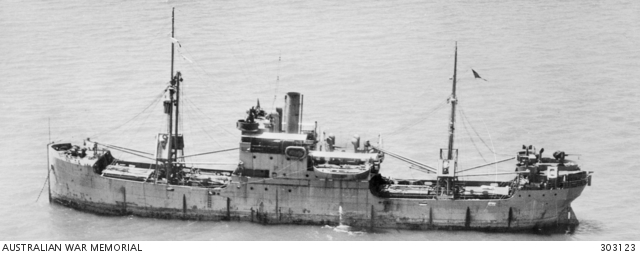
USAT City of Houston in 1944, a design 1099 freighter originally launched as Lake Strymon

=== World War II ===
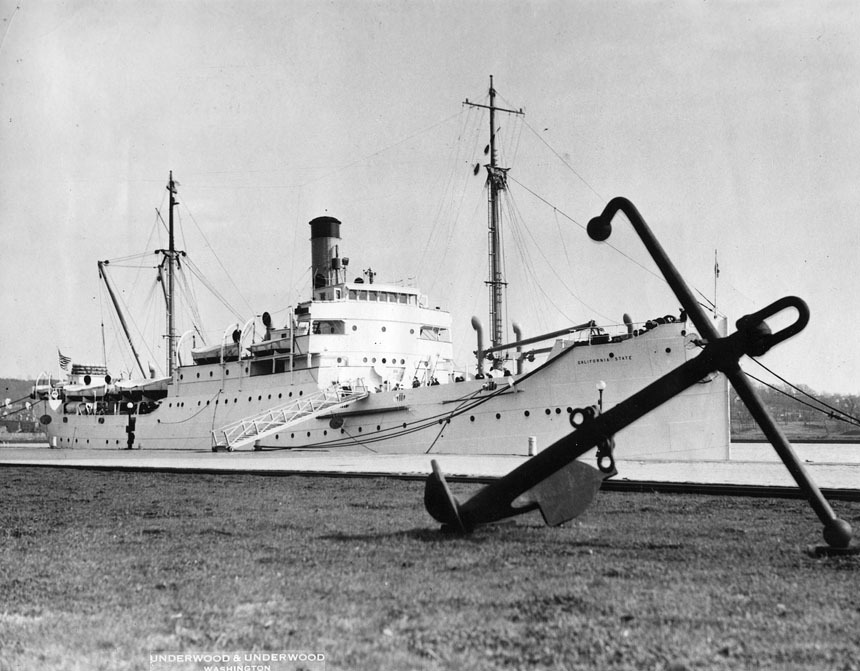
Training ship California State, the former design 1099 ship Henry County

The entire class of design 1099 ships missed World War I, but two-thirds of the ships were still at sea in 1940 as World War II grew in scope. While the Shipping Board had sold most design 1099 ships to American firms, these had since been sold on to a wide range of operators around the world. In 1940, the Soviet Union had the largest foreign fleet of design 1099 with eight ships, but the ships also sailed under the flags of Brazil, Canada, China, Colombia, France, Great Britain, Italy, Japan, Norway, and Panama. As a result, design 1099 ships both supported the war aims of, and were sunk by all the major combatants.

Eight design 1099 ships were chartered or requisitioned to become US Army transport ships, and another served a similar function as a British Ministry of War transport ship. Several were assigned to the US Army Small Ships Section, an improvised fleet of civilian ships based in Australia which supported the advance of General Douglas MacArthur in the southwest Pacific. They frequently carried cargoes to the front lines of the war. For example, on one trip to Biak, USAT City of Fort Worth carried frozen food, 155 mm shells, jeeps, 105 mm guns, and fuses for every shell aboard.

Design 1099 ships as military auxiliaries in World War II
| Original design 1099 name | Military auxiliary name |
|---|---|
| Fargo | USAT Norlago |
| La Crosse | USAT City of Fort Worth |
| Lake Fillion | USAT City of Dallas |
| Lake Flatonia | USAT Vannes |
| Lake Flattery | USAT City of Houston |
| Lake Floris | USAT Merrimack |
| Lake Giddings | USAT Caribqueen |
| Lake Glasco | USAT Roanoke |
| Lake Inglenook | MoWT Empire Tern |

Whether as a military auxiliary or a commercial freighter, World War II was dangerous for slow design 1099 ships. Of the 59 afloat in 1940, 25 were sunk by enemy action during the war.

Design 1099 ships sunk by enemy action in World War II
| Ship | Design 1099 name | Flagged | Sunk by | Date | Location |
|---|---|---|---|---|---|
| Western Head | Bartholomew | Bahamas | U-107 | 28 May 1942 | south of Cuba |
| Bayou | Lake Fairfax | Panama | U-129 | 28 February 1942 | north of Paramaribo |
| Herport | Lake Fairport | U.K. | German mine | 14 March 1941 | SE of the Humber |
| Norlantic | Lake Fandango | U.S. | U-69 | 12 May 1942 | Near Bonaire |
| Chuckcha | Lake Fandon | USSR | USS S-34 | 31 May 1943 | near Paramushir |
| Caribstar | Lake Fanquier | U.S. | U-175 | 4 October 1942 | north of Guyana |
| Florence D | Lake Farmingdale | U.S. | Japanese aircraft | 19 February 1942 | near Darwin, Australia |
| Nissho Maru | Lake Farrar | Japan | U.S. mine | 12 May 1945 | Shimonoseki, Japan |
| Atlantic Gulf | Lake Faulk | Panama | I-10 | 6 June 1942 | Mozambique Channel |
| Zyrianin | Lake Flavonia | USSR | German aircraft | 1 April 1942 | off Feodosia, Russia |
| William J. Salman | Lake Felden | U.S. | U-125 | 18 May 1942 | south of Cuba |
| Shinsei Maru No. 17 | Lake Fielding | Japan | U.S. aircraft | 12 January 1945 | near Saigon |
| Fenicia | Lake Fife | Italy | HMS Unique | 10 March 1941 | north of Tripoli |
| Leslie | Lake Flagstaff | U.S. | U-123 | 13 April 1942 | off Cape Canaveral, Florida |
| Frances Salman | Lake Flambeau | U.S. | U-552 | 18 January 1942 | St. Johns, Newfoundland |
| Caribsea | Lake Flattery | U.S. | U-158 | 11 March 1942 | off Cape Lookout, N.C. |
| Tillie Lykes | Lake Florian | U.S. | U-154 | 28 June 1942 | south of Dominican Republic |
| USAT Merrimack | Lake Floris | U.S. | U-107 | 10 June 1942 | near Cozumel, Mexico. |
| Velma Lykes | Lake Flournoy | U.S. | U-158 | 5 June 1942 | in the Yucatán Channel |
| Ruth Lykes | Lake Gera | U.S. | U-103 | 16 May 1942 | off Cape Falso, Nicaragua |
| USAT Roanoke | Lake Glasco | U.S. | U-1055 | 11 January 1945 | Irish Sea |
| Commercial Trader | Lake Tippah | U.S. | U-558 | 16 September 1942 | east of Trinidad |
| Herland | Lake Treba | U.K. | German mine | 7 November 1940 | The Nore, England |
| Palma | Santa Eulalia | Germany | HMS Torbay | 27 November 1943 | off Samos, Greece |
| Nidarnes | Santa Isabel | Norway | U-159 | 4 June 1942 | in the Yucatán Channel |

=== Postwar ===
Beyond the 25 ships that were sunk by enemy action, at least another 7 foundered or were wrecked in maritime accidents from 1940 to 1945. Fifteen design 1099 ships are known to have survived the war, but the fate of the ships in the hands of the Soviets, devastated Japan, and revolutionary China is unknown. The last design 1099 ship afloat may have been Avia, a Panamanian-flagged ship that was launched as Lake Falun. She was wrecked on Alacranes Reef, off the Yucatán coast, on 26 December 1958, just short of 38 years after her completion in Detroit.
