= USS Henry County (IX-34) =

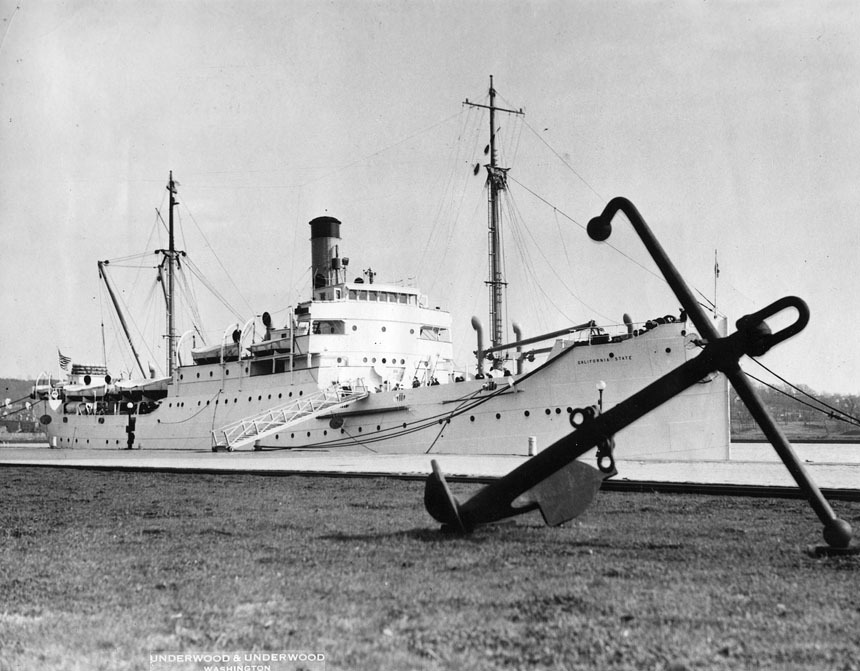
- T/S California State at the Washington Navy Yard on 7 April 1932

History

United States
- Name: USS Henry County
- Namesake: Henry County, Alabama; Henry County, Georgia; Henry County, Illinois; Henry County, Indiana; Henry County, Iowa; Henry County, Kentucky; Henry County, Ohio; Henry County, Tennessee; Henry County, Virginia
- Commissioned: 27 May 1930
- Decommissioned: 22 August 1930
- Fate: Transferred to the Maritime Commission on 30 June 1940; scrapped August 1962

General characteristics
- Displacement: 3,640 tons
- Length: 253 ft 6 in (77.27 m)
- Beam: 43 ft 8 in (13.31 m)
- Draught: 15 ft 6 in (4.72 m)
- Speed: 9.5 knots (17.6 km/h; 10.9 mph)
- Complement: 37

USS Henry County (IX-34), an unclassified miscellaneous vessel, was the first ship of the United States Navy to be named for Henry County, which exists in Alabama, Georgia, Illinois, Indiana, Iowa, Kentucky, Ohio, Tennessee, and Virginia.

Construction of the ship was commissioned by the Emergency Fleet Corporation of the United States Shipping Board in response to American shipping needs in World War I. She was one of the mass-produced Design 1099 ships built for the Shipping Board. She was built by the American Shipbuilding Company at its Lorain, Ohio shipyard. Originally named Lake Fellowship when her keel was laid, she was named Henry County when launched. The ship was completed in November 1919.

Henry County was transferred from the Shipping Board to the Navy on 24 May 1930 so the Navy could loan her to the State of California to serve as a training vessel for the newly formed California Nautical School (later California Maritime Academy). She was commissioned at Portsmouth, Virginia, on 27 May 1930 with Commander Benjamin Vaughan McCandlish in command.

Henry County sailed for the West Coast on 12 July, transiting the Panama Canal on 23 July and arriving in San Diego, California, via Corinto, Nicaragua, on 13 August. She decommissioned at Mare Island, California, on 22 August 1930 and was loaned to the State of California that same day. She was renamed California State on 23 January 1931. California State was stricken from the Navy List on 11 April 1940, and the transfer to the Maritime Commission was completed on 30 June 1940.

California State was renamed Golden State in 1941 under a Maritime Commission policy, which renamed the training ships to their states' nicknames. She was returned to the reserve fleet on 13 August 1946, and her successor, TS Golden Bear was commissioned on 7 September 1946. The ex-Golden State was sold to John E. Tsavaris and operated under a U.S. flag as Isle of Patmos starting in November 1947. She was renamed to Santa Rosa and sailed under a Brazilian flag until she was scrapped in August 1962.
