= SS Norlantic =

History

United States
- Name: SS Lake Fandango (1919–1933); SS Lexington (1933–1941); SS Norlantic (1941–1942)
- Owner: U.S. Shipping Board (1919–1933); Merchants & Miners Transportation Co. (1933–1941); Norlasco Steamship Co. (1941–1942)
- Builder: Detroit Shipbuilding Company, Wyandotte, Michigan
- Launched: 24 December 1919
- Fate: Torpedoed and scuttled, 13 May 1942

General characteristics
- Type: Design 1099 ship
- Displacement: 2,606 tons
- Crew: 29

SS Norlantic was an American cargo ship of the Norlasco Steamship Company of New York that was scuttled after being damaged by U-69 in May 1942 with the loss of seven lives. The ship was built as SS Lake Fandango, a Design 1099 ship of the United States Shipping Board (USSB), in 1919 and had also sailed under the name SS Lexington.

== Career ==
Lake Fandango was laid down by the Detroit Shipbuilding Company of Wyandotte, Michigan for the USSB and launched on 24 December 1919. Details of her merchant career after her March 1920 completion are not reported in secondary sources. In 1933, the ship was sold to the Merchants & Miners Transportation Company of Baltimore, Maryland, and was renamed Lexington. In 1941, the ship was sold to the Norlasco Steamship Company of New York and renamed Norlantic.

In May 1942, Norlantic, loaded with a 3,800-long-ton (3,860 t) general cargo that included cement and steel pipe, sailed from Pensacola, Florida for Puerto La Cruz, Venezuela. In the early morning hours of 13 May, while about 90 nautical miles (170 km) east of Bonaire, the vessel came under attack by U-69. At 03:38, U-69, under the command of Kapitänleutnant Ulrich Graf, launched two torpedoes that missed the ship. After closing to a distance of 2,000 metres (2,200 yd) from Norlantic, Graf began shelling the vessel at the bridge at 03:47. After the first several shell hits on Norlantic, her crew tried to signal the German boat that they were abandoning ship to avoid further attack, and launched two lifeboats and two life rafts. Graf, unaware of the signal attempt, continued shelling the boat. At 04:11, three minutes after a coup de grâce hit Norlantic's port boiler room, the battered vessel was scuttled by the captain, taking down six men—two killed below, and four killed by shellfire during the evacuation of the boat. A seventh man in one of the lifeboats later died of his wounds.

On the afternoon of 16 May, three days after the attack, the pair of lifeboats was spotted by Netherlands trading schooners India and Mississippi, which took the boats under tow to Bonaire. Eight days later, and 11 days after the attack, two men aboard one of the rafts were rescued by SS Marpesia and landed at Port of Spain, Trinidad. The three men on the second raft were finally rescued on 19 June by the tug Crusader Kingston at position 14°2′N 83°13′W, drifting some 1,000 nautical miles (1,900 km) from the scene of Norlantic's demise in the 37 days since the sinking.
