= Detroit Wayne (1919 ship) =

Steel-hulled cargo ship

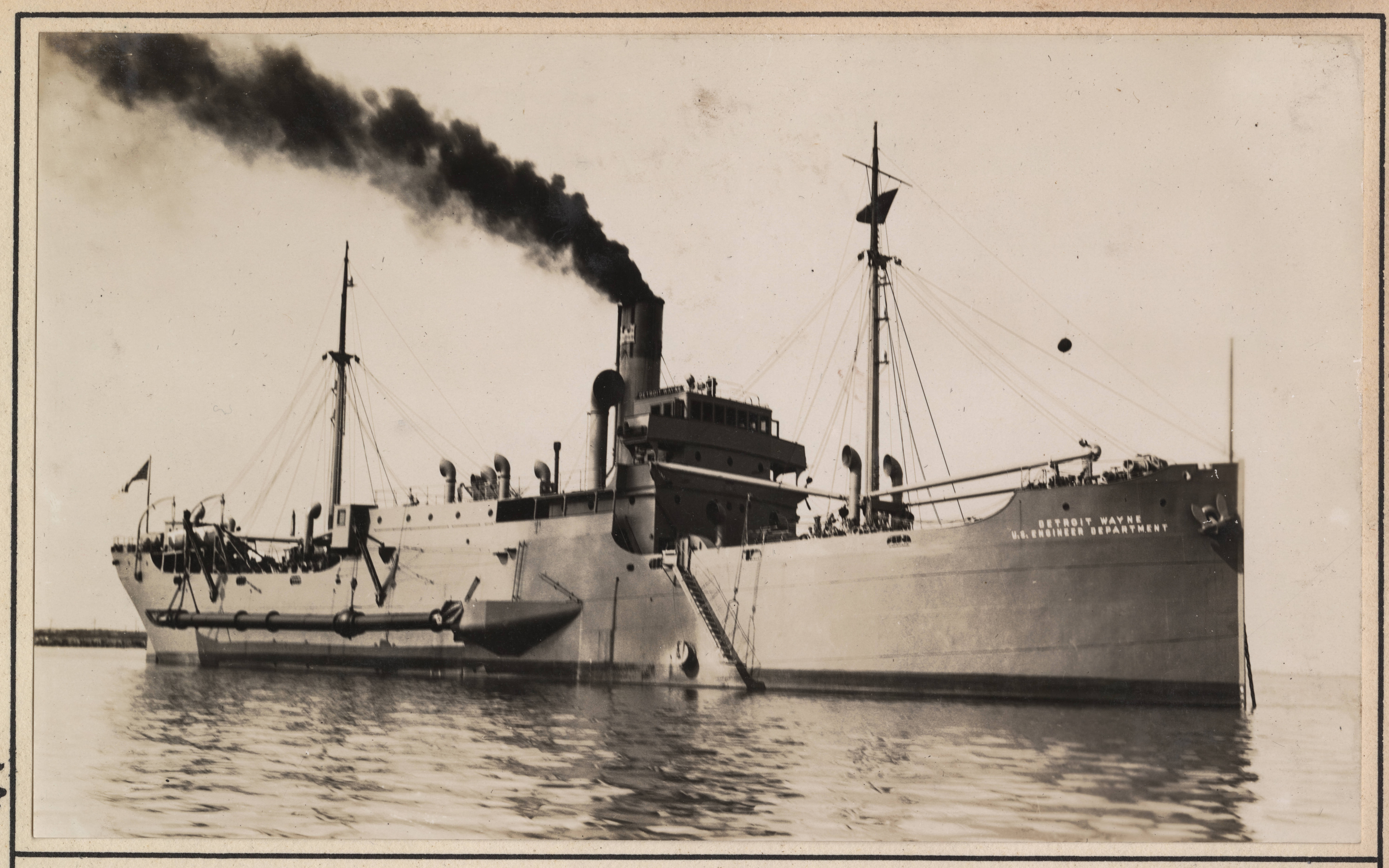
- U.S.E.D. Detroit Wayne

History

United States
- Name: Detroit Wayne (1919-1940); Raritan (1940-1942)
- Owner: United States Shipping Board (1919-1940); Raritan Steamship Company (1940-1942)
- Builder: Detroit Shipbuilding Company
- Launched: 8 November 1919
- Identification: Official number: 219258; Radio call sign: KONX
- Fate: Wrecked on Frying Pan Shoal 25 February 1942

General characteristics
- Type: Design 1099 cargo ship
- Tonnage: 2,606 Gross registered tons 1,612 Net registered tons 4,050 dwt
- Length: 251 ft (77 m)
- Beam: 43 ft 6 in (13.26 m)
- Draft: 24 ft 2 in (7.37 m)
- Installed power: 1500 horsepower
- Propulsion: Oil-fired triple-expansion steam engine
- Speed: 9.5 knots

The steamship Detroit Wayne was steel-hulled freighter built for the United States Shipping Board in 1919. She carried freight across the Atlantic in 1920 and 1921. Afterward, she was likely idled until 1932 when she was converted into a dredge for the U.S. Army Corps of Engineers. She was active in the Mississippi River for several years. In 1940, Detroit Wayne was sold to private interests, renamed Raritan, and converted back into a freighter. She was wrecked off the North Carolina coast in February 1942.

== Construction and characteristics ==
When the United States entered World War I in April 1917, neither it nor any allied power had shipping capacity to carry the two million Americans who sailed for Europe, much less all their accompanying armament and supplies. What shipping did exist in the Atlantic was pared back by Germany's U-boats, which sank almost 5,000 ships during the war. The United States Shipping Board through its wholly owned Emergency Fleet Corporation mass-produced ships to a few standard designs to "build a bridge across the ocean." Detroit Wayne was one of those ships.

Detroit Wayne was built to the Shipping Board's standard Design 1099. She was built of welded steel plates. She was 251 feet (77 m) long between perpendiculars, with a beam of 43 feet 6 inches (13.26 m), and a depth of hold of 28 feet 2 inches (8.59 m). Her fully loaded draft was just over 24 feet (7.3 m). Deadweight tonnage, the weight of cargo which could be carried, was 4050 tons. Gross register tonnage was 2,606, while her net register tonnage was 1,612.

Detroit Wayne had a single propeller which was driven by a single triple-expansion steam engine with 1,500 indicated horsepower (1,100 kW). This engine had high, medium, and low pressure cylinders with diameters of 21 inches, 35 inches, and 59 inches respectively, with a stroke of 42 inches. Steam was provided by two boilers, which were oil-fired. The ship was capable of reaching 9.5 knots. Her fuel tanks could hold 708 tons of oil, giving her a steaming range of just over 8,000 miles.

She had two cargo holds, each of which had two hatches. Each hold was serviced by four cargo booms, each of which had its own winch. The heaviest load that could be winched aboard was 4 tons. Detroit Wayne had an effective cargo capacity of 166,806 cubic feet for baled cargo and 180,033 cubic feet for grain.

The ship was named Lake Fairton when her keel was laid, but she was launched as Detroit Wayne. Her name was changed to honor Detroit and Wayne County for oversubscribing to all of the Liberty Loan bond issues which funded America's World War I spending. She was built by the Detroit Shipbuilding Company, a unit of the American Shipbuilding Company, at its Wyandotte, Michigan shipyard. She was launched on 8 November 1919 and delivered to the Shipping Board in April 1920. Her original cost was $777,751.41.

== Service history ==
=== United States Shipping Board (1919–1932) ===
After delivery to the Shipping Board, Detroit Wayne made her way through the Great Lakes to the Atlantic, passing through the Lachine Canal on 23 June 1920, and arriving at Portland, Maine on 17 July 1920. She sailed for New York the next day and on to Philadelphia on 30 July 1920 to begin her work.

Clyde Steamship Company house flag

The Shipping Board consigned Detroit Wayne to the Clyde Steamship Company, which placed her in trans-Atlantic service. On 29 August 1920 she left Philadelphia for Genoa, Italy with stops in Marseilles, and Port St. Louis du Rhone. She passed Gibraltar on 12 September 1920 and arrived in Genoa on 25 September 1920.

Detroit Wayne made seven more trans-Atlantic crossings, returning to Genoa twice, and sailing to Avonmouth, U.K. twice. She stopped in New York and Philadelphia on both outbound and return trips from Europe. On each of these trips she stopped at a number of intermediate ports including Hull, Newcastle, Naples, and Bizerte. On her last trans-Atlantic crossing, she departed Marseilles, bound for Philadelphia on 18 September 1921. Detroit Wayne was redelivered to the Shipping Board at Norfolk, Virginia on 5 October 1921.

In December 1921, the Shipping Board executed a bareboat charter agreement with Halschaw Steamship Line, Incorporated. Halschaw failed to fund the surety bond required by the Shipping Board and litigation ensued. It is not clear if Detroit Wayne ever sailed for Halschaw.

=== U.S. Army Corps of Engineers (1932–1940) ===
In 1932, the Shipping Board transferred Detroit Wayne and sister ship Lake Fenn, both of which were idle in the reserve fleet in the James River, to the War Department. The boilers, winches, and other equipment were removed from Lake Fenn and installed on Detroit Wayne to convert her from a freighter into an agitator dredge for the U.S. Army Corps of Engineers. Sealed bids for the work were opened on 10 June 1932. The Maryland Drydock Company, Incorporated submitted the low bid of $154,000 for the project and was awarded the contract. The two ships were towed from James River to the Maryland Drydock Company shipyard in Baltimore, arriving on 7 July 1932. The out-of-pocket cost of the conversion, not counting the parts removed from Lake Fenn, was $156,317.13.

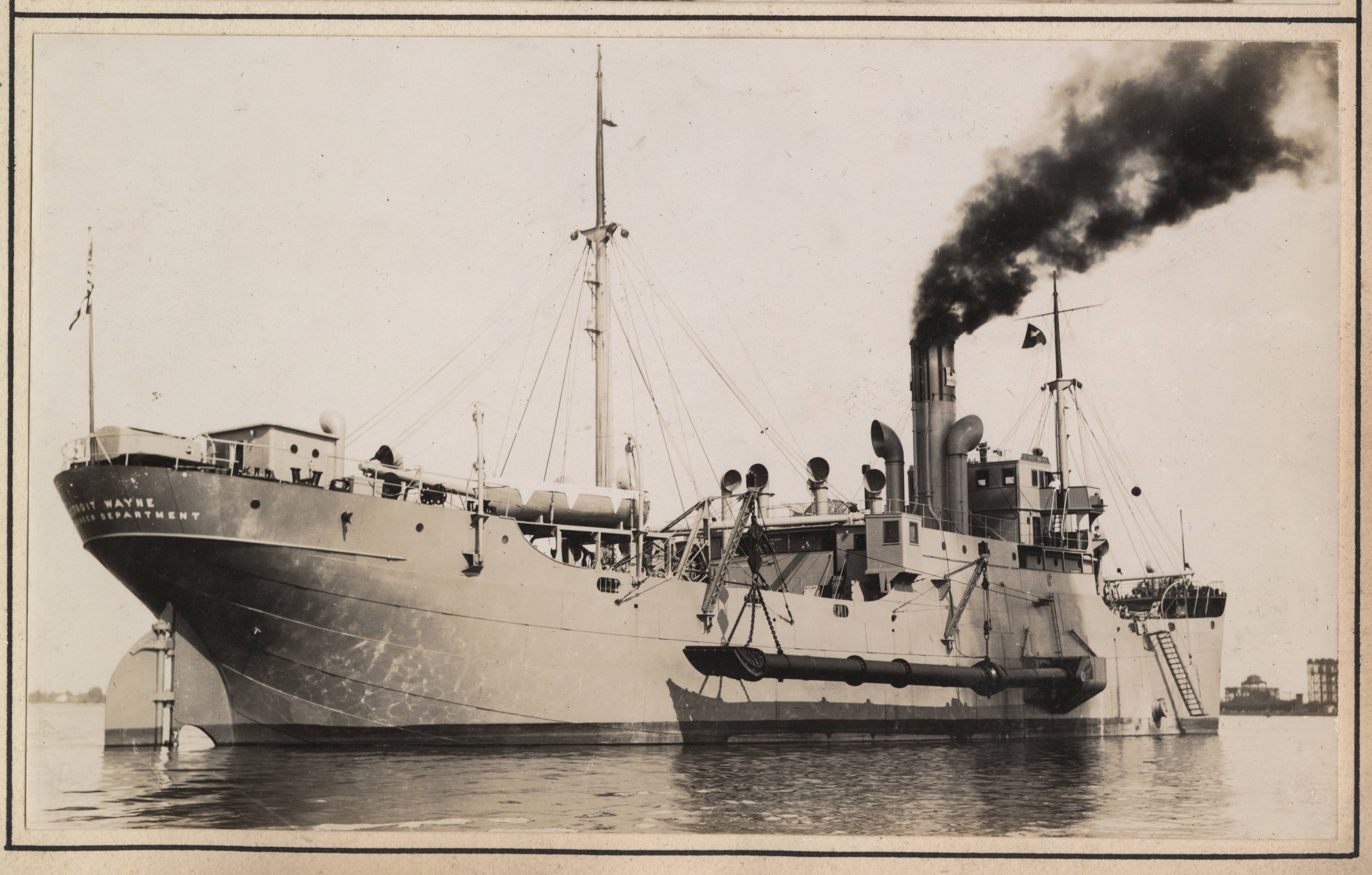
Starboard quarter of U.S.E.D Detroit Wayne

The conversion was designed by U.S. Army Captain H. B. Vaughn, jr. The two boilers on Lake Fenn were removed and installed on Detroit Wayne to provide additional steam for engines which drove the dredge pumps. There were two triple-expansion steam engines, each with an indicated horsepower of 775, which drove the pumps. They had high, medium, and low pressure cylinders of 13.25 inches, 20 inches, and 31.5 inches with a stroke of 20 inches. The suction and output of the pumps was 30 inches in diameter. The suction side of the pumps were connected to port and starboard drag arms which could be lowered to the bottom. The #2 hold was converted into a pump room to accommodate the new equipment. In her new dredge configuration, her crew was variously reported as 80 or 99 men, for which accommodations were provided aboard. After the conversion, Lake Fenn was scrapped. Two additional design 1099 ships, Lake Fairfax and Lake Faxon also underwent this conversion, with Lake Fairfax surviving as a dredge.

Detroit Wayne was an agitator dredge. She would dredge while anchored or proceeding slowly up river. Her pumps would dislodged stabilized material at the bottom and then pump it into the stream which would carry the silt away with the current. Under certain conditions, this allowed the power of the river itself to erode the newly exposed stream bed into a deeper channel.

In September 1932, just after her conversion, Detroit Wayne dredged the James River between Dancing Point Shoal and Swann Point. This test was successful. In October, the ship stopped in at the Norfolk Naval Shipyard to have her drag arms unshipped and placed on deck for the voyage to her new home port. She was assigned to the 2nd U.S. Engineers District, based in New Orleans, and became U.S.E.D Detroit Wayne.

The ship was used to dredge multiple obstructions on the Mississippi River and in the Atchafalaya Basin from 1933 until at least 1937. Among the locations she dredged were around Vicksburg, Natchez, Waterproof, Louisiana, and Grand Gulf, Mississippi.

=== Raritan Steamship Corporation (1940–1942) ===
Detroit Wayne was purchased by the Raritan Steamship Company of New York in 1940. Her name was changed to Raritan, and she was converted back into a freighter. Her home port was New Orleans. The ship was managed by Smith-Johnson Steamship Corporation. In January 1941, Raritan was loaded in Maryland with defense materials bound primarily for St. Lucia and Antigua. These materials were intended for new U.S. facilities acquired from Britain under the destroyers-for-bases-deal.

Raritan was headed north with a load of coffee on 25 February 1942. Unbeknownst to her captain, the Frying Pan Shoals lightship had been withdrawn. The ship was advised to stay close to shore due to the U-boat threat, but the night was stormy and the crew were unsure of their position. Just after midnight Raritan grounded hard on the shoal. After seven hours aground, all 29 of the crew were rescued by the Coast Guard. Two hours later the ship floated off and broke up as the tide came in, and she sank in deeper water.
