= Golden Bear (band) =

Independent rock band from Austin, Texas

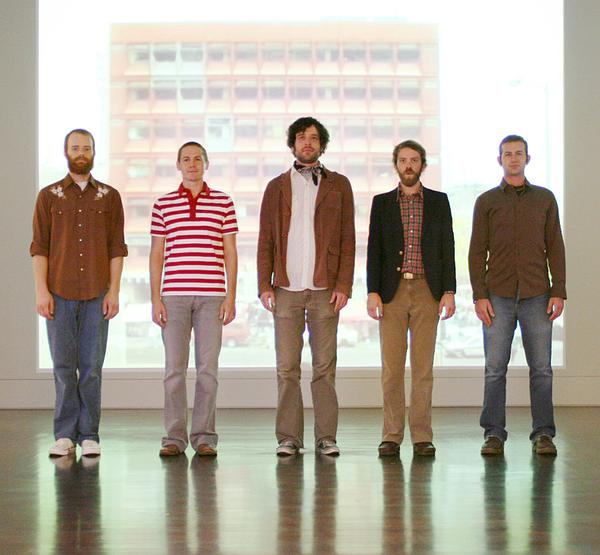
- Golden Bear in 2007 (photo: Matt Wright)

Background information
- Origin: Austin, Texas, USA
- Genres: Indie rock music
- Years active: 2003-present
- Labels: c-side records
- Members: Chris Gregory (guitar, vocals), Matt Gardiner (keys), Andrew Gregory (bass), Andy McAllister (drums); Brent Pennington (vocals, guitar, keyboards)
- Website: myspace

Golden Bear is an independent rock group from Austin, Texas.

Golden Bear's sound is driven by themes of hope and excitement. They have released three full-length albums, Golden Bear (2006), To the Farthest Star (2007), Alive (2011), and one EP entitled Everest (2009). Golden Bear's first album drew comparisons to Built to Spill and Modest Mouse, while spin.com praised it for its "unparalleled crescendos and soaring choruses". The album also featured members of Voxtrot and the Black Angels (band). The band's second album drew comparisons to The Soft Bulletin-era Flaming Lips ".

Golden Bear began work on their third album in 2009. It was released in 2011. MTV.com dubbed it a "full-fledged power pop epic". while others praised it for its "muscular yet melodic" sound.

== Discography ==
=== Albums ===
- Golden Bear (2006)
- To the Farthest Star (2007)
- Alive (2011)

=== EPs ===
- Everest (2009)
