= USS Mellena =

American amphibious cargo ship

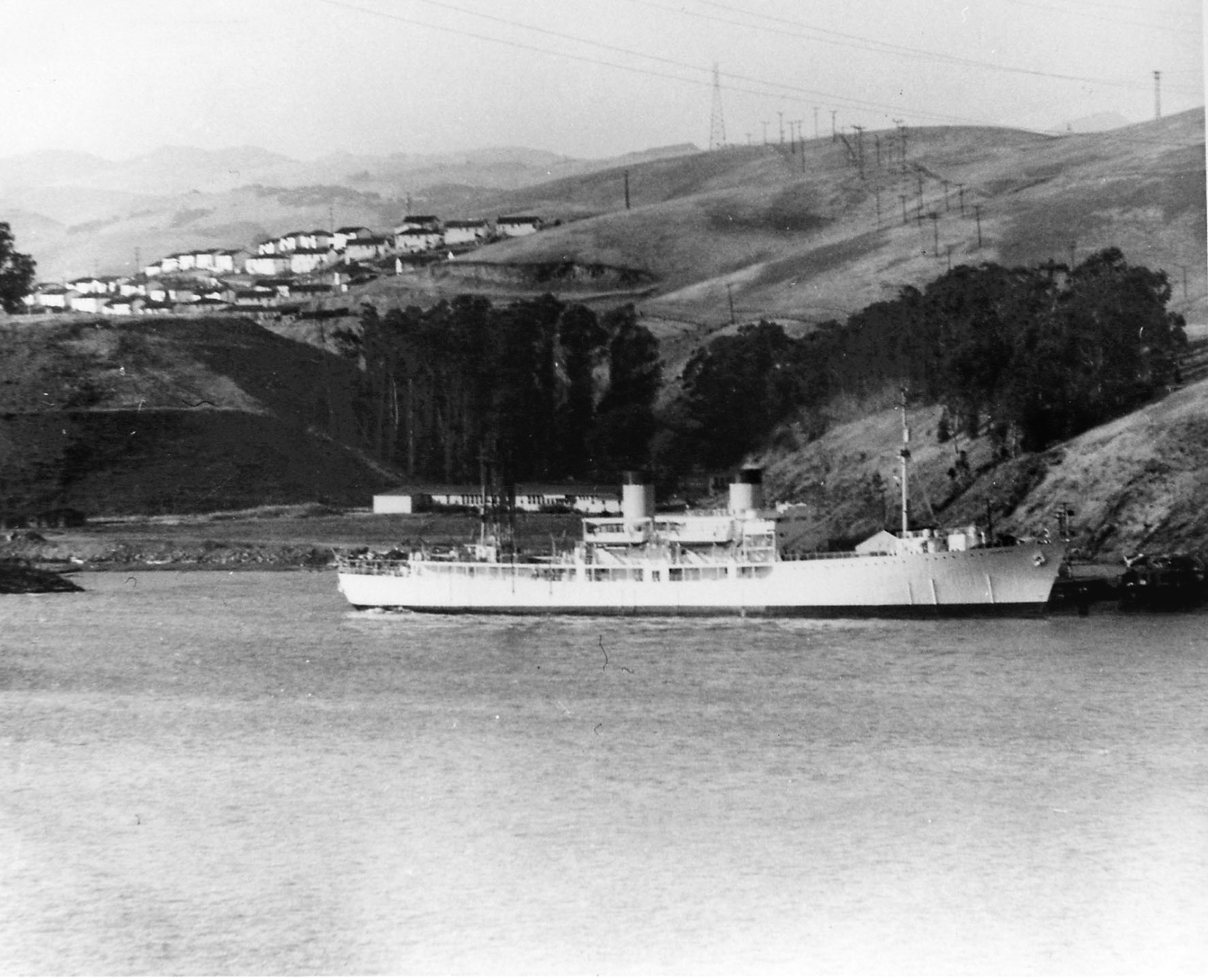

History

United States
- Name: USS Mellena
- Namesake: The asteroid Mellena
- Builder: Walsh-Kaiser Company, Providence, Rhode Island
- Laid down: 25 September 1944
- Launched: 11 December 1944
- Commissioned: 20 January 1945
- Decommissioned: 11 June 1946
- Stricken: 3 July 1946
- Fate: Transferred to the California Maritime Academy and commissioned as TS Golden Bear in 1946. Decommissioned in 1971 and sold for scrap.

General characteristics
- Class & type: Artemis-class attack cargo ship
- Type: S4–SE2–BE1
- Displacement: 4,087 long tons (4,153 t) light; 7,080 long tons (7,194 t) full
- Length: 426 ft (130 m)
- Beam: 58 ft (18 m)
- Draft: 16 ft (4.9 m)
- Speed: 17 knots (31 km/h; 20 mph)
- Complement: 303 officers and enlisted
- Armament: 1 × 5"/38 caliber gun mount; 4 × twin 40 mm gun mounts; 10 × 20 mm gun mounts

USS Mellena (AKA-32) was an Artemis-class attack cargo ship named after the minor planet 869 Mellena, which in turn was named after Werner von Melle, mayor of Hamburg. She served as a commissioned ship for 16 months.

Mellena (AKA-32) was laid down under Maritime Commission contract by Walsh-Kaiser Co., Inc., Providence, R.I., 25 September 1944; launched 11 December 1944; sponsored by Mrs. Paul P. Neal; acquired by the Navy 20 January 1945; and commissioned the same day.

== Service history ==
After shakedown out of Norfolk, Va., Mellena carried cargo via Guantanamo Bay and Panama to Pearl Harbor where she arrived in mid–March. She trained in Hawaiian waters until 8 April; and following a cargo run to San Francisco and back continued amphibious support training exercises until sailing for the Philippines 13 June. She reached Guiuan, Samar, 28 June. During the closing weeks of fighting in the western Pacific, she made cargo runs to the Palaus, the Admiralties, and the Marianas, and at the cessation of hostilities she was anchored at Iwo Jima. After transporting Seabees to Saipan, she returned to Leyte Gulf 28 August to carry occupation troops to Japan.

Assigned to Transport Squadron 24, Mellena embarked 242 MPs and Army Engineers of the XIV Corps at Manila and sailed for Japan 7 September. Reaching Tokyo Bay the 13th, she steamed up the Honshū coast and debarked her troops at Shiogama two days later. She battled typhoon seas off Honshū 18 September and arrived Okinawa a week later to embark units of the 1st Marine Division. Operating with the 7th Amphibious Group, she sailed for Chinese waters 29 September to support the U.S. program of assisting the Chinese Nationalists in their efforts to regain control of mainland China following the defeat of Japan.

Mellena entered the Gulf of Zhili 3 October and during the next week she debarked the 1st Marines who were ordered to take control of the Tientsin area until Nationalist troops could be brought in to replace them. Departing Tanggu 11 October, she steamed via the Philippines to French Indochina where she arrived in the approaches to Hai Phong 26 October. There she boatloaded 906 troops of the 52nd Chinese Army and support equipment before sailing for northern China 30 October. As part of an eight–ship troop convoy, she reached Qinhuangdao, China, 7 November and discharged the Nationalist troops. She returned to Tanggu two days later and on the 13th was assigned to "Magic Carpet" duty. Steaming via Qingdao and Okinawa, she sailed with a capacity load of returning troops and arrived Portland, Oregon, 12 December.

From 14 December to 9 January 1946, Mellena underwent repairs at Willamette Iron & Steel Co. Thence she sailed 18 January for San Pedro where she arrived the 29th via San Francisco and San Diego. Designated for conversion to a surveying ship (AGS) 26 January, she operated out of San Pedro under Service Force, Pacific Fleet, until 6 March when she was ordered to be disposed of rather than converted. Assigned to the 12th Naval District 9 April, she reached Vallejo, California, the 15th.

She decommissioned there 11 June 1946 and simultaneously was transferred to War Shipping Administration for delivery to the California Maritime Academy. Mellena was struck from the Navy list 3 July 1946. Subsequently, she was recommissioned for the academy as TS Golden Bear. She was sold for scrap following her decommissioning in 1971.
