= Cal Poly Maritime Academy =

Public university in Vallejo, California

Coordinates: 38°4′10″N 122°13′47″W

Cal Poly Maritime
- Former names: California Nautical School (1929–1939); California Maritime Academy (1939–2015); California State University Maritime Academy (2015–2025)
- Motto: Laborare Pugnare Parati Sumus (Latin)
- Motto in English: "To work, to fight, we are ready"
- Type: Public maritime college
- Established: 1929; 97 years ago
- Parent institution: California Polytechnic State University, San Luis Obispo
- Accreditation: WSCUC
- Endowment: $19.16 million (2024)
- President: Eric C. Jones
- Students: 804 (fall 2024)
- Undergraduates: 793 (fall 2024)
- Postgraduates: 11 (fall 2024)
- Location: Vallejo, California, United States
- Campus: 92 acres (37 ha); Midsize city
- Colors: Navy and gold
- Nickname: Keelhaulers
- Sporting affiliations: NAIA – Cal Pac
- Mascot: Keelhaulers
- Website: maritime.calpoly.edu

The California Polytechnic State University Maritime Academy (Cal Poly Maritime) is a satellite campus of California Polytechnic State University, San Luis Obispo, located in Vallejo, California, that operates as a maritime academy. Founded in 1929, it was a separate public university in the California State University system until it was absorbed on July 1, 2025.

== History ==
The California Nautical School was established in 1929, when California State Assembly Bill No. 253 was signed into law by Governor C. C. Young. The bill authorized the creation of the school, the appointment of a board of governors to manage the school and the acquisition of a training vessel. The school's mission was "to give practical and theoretical instruction in navigation, seamanship, steam engines, gas engines, and electricity in order to prepare young men to serve as officers in the American Merchant Marine." By 1930, a training vessel and a school site was acquired; the original site was in Tiburon in the San Francisco Bay Area.

Due to the Great Depression, the early days of the school were full of financial uncertainty. As early as 1933, some state legislators were calling for the school's abolition. To save money, cadets and instructors alike lived and held classes aboard the training vessel, the T.S. California State. Only after the passage of the Merchant Marine Act of 1936 did the funding for the school stabilize.

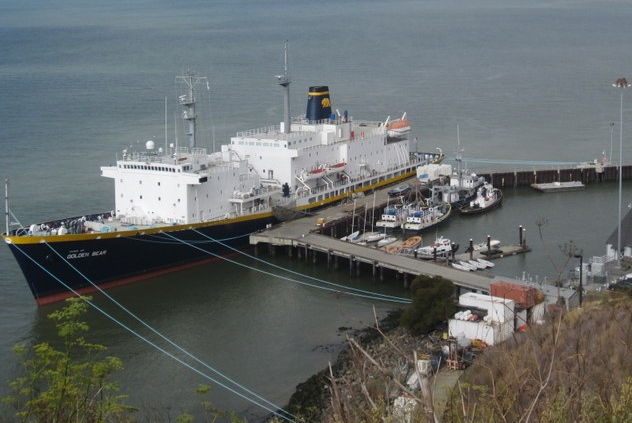
TS Golden Bear after it was hauled out and painted navy blue

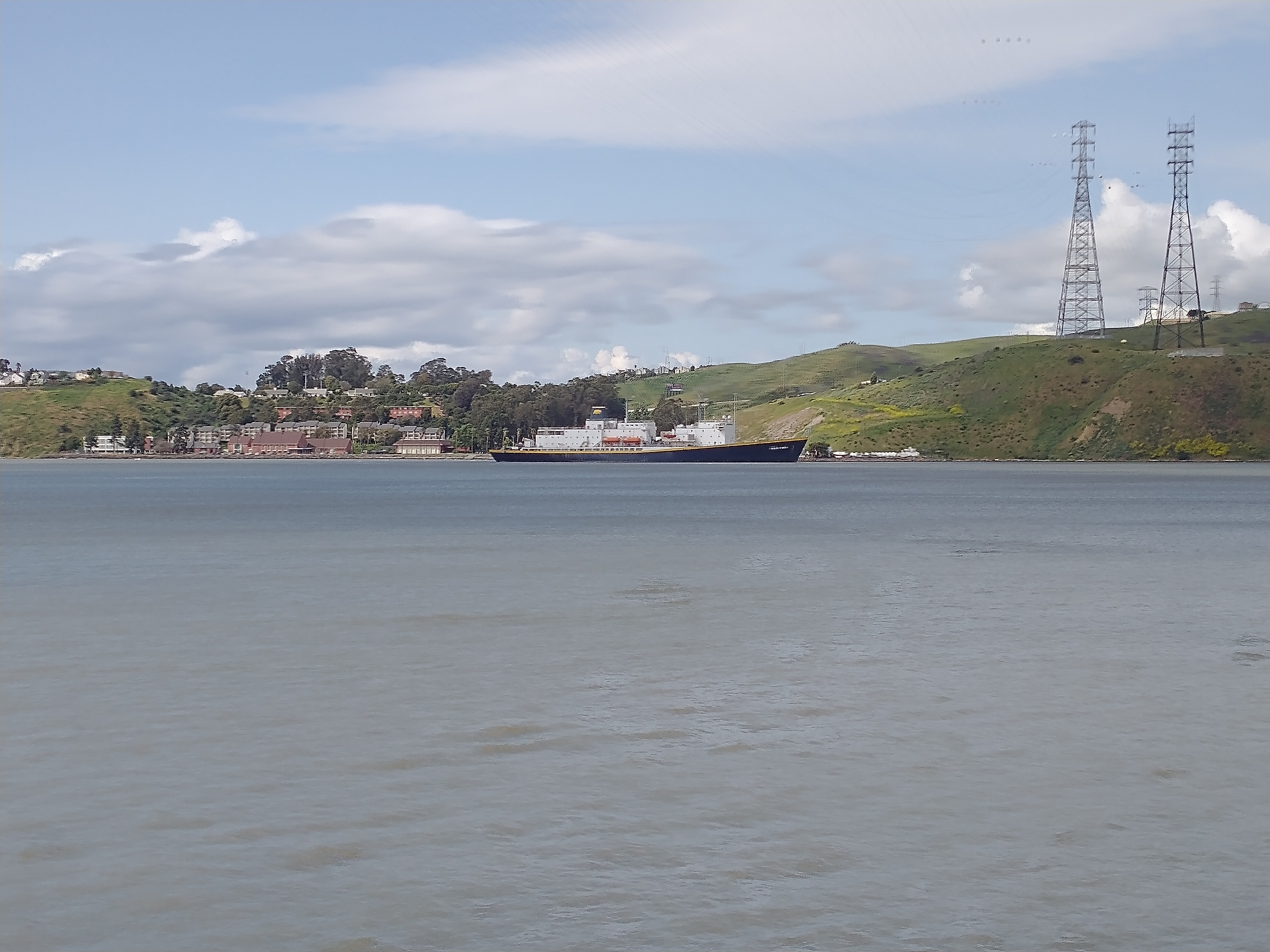
Golden Bear and campus, viewed from across the Carquinez Strait

In 1939 the California Nautical School adopted the name California Maritime Academy. By 1940, the academy was granting Bachelor of Science degrees and Naval Reserve commissions to its graduates; this step marked the beginning of the transition from the status of trade school to college. In 1943, the academy moved to its present location in Vallejo, California.

In the 1970s, after surviving another round of budget cuts and calls for the academy's abolition, California Maritime Academy became a four-year institution. The 1970s also marked the time when the first minority and female cadets graduated from California Maritime Academy.

In 1995, California Maritime Academy became the twenty-second campus of the California State University system. The new affiliation improved the academy's funding prospects considerably. The current training vessel is the TS Golden Bear III; it is the third training ship to carry that name.

In September 2015, the California State University Board of Trustees approved a new name, California State University Maritime Academy.

In 2024, the California State University system voted to integrate the university with California Polytechnic State University, San Luis Obispo, citing significant financial challenges and a 31% decline in enrollment over the past seven years at Cal Maritime. The integration took place in July 2025. The land-based part of the school was renamed Cal Poly Solano Campus and the sea-based school was renamed Cal Poly Maritime Academy.

=== Superintendents and presidents ===
A rear admiral's flag

Since the passage of the Merchant Marine Act of 1970, the position of president of the Cal Poly Maritime is commissioned as a rear admiral (upper half) in the United States Maritime Service. Two past presidents are alumni of the academy.

From	To	Name	Rank	Notes
May 11, 1930	February 14, 1934	Emil Topp	LCDR, USN (ret)	
February 15, 1934	June 30, 1937	Richard C. Dwyer		See Note 1
July 1, 1937	June 30, 1940	Neil E. Nichols	CAPT, USN (ret)	
July 1, 1940	October 31, 1947	Claude B. Mayo	CAPT, USN (ret)	See Note 2
November 1, 1947	February 15, 1955	Russel M. Ihreg	COMMO, USN (ret)	
February 16, 1955	June 20, 1955	Carroll T. Bonney	CAPT, USN (ret)	acting superintendent
June 21, 1955	November 1, 1965	Henry E. Richter	CAPT, USN (ret)	
October 15, 1965	October 1, 1971	Francis T. Williamson	RADM, USN (ret)	
October 1, 1971	August 1, 1972	Edwin C. Miller	CDR, USN (ret)	'34-D CMA, interim, see Note 3
August 2, 1972	November 11, 1983	Joseph P. Rizza	RADM, USMS	CAPT, USN (ret), see Note 4
November 11, 1983	August 31, 1990	John J. Ekelund	RADM, USMS	RADM, USN (ret)
August 31, 1990	June 30, 1996	Mary E. Lyons	RADM, USMS	CDR, USNR
July 1, 1996	June 30, 2001	Jerry A. Aspland	RADM, USMS	'62-D CMA
July 1, 2001	June 30, 2012	William B. Eisenhardt	RADM, USMS	Unk, USN
July 1, 2012	June 30, 2023	Thomas A. Cropper	RADM, USMS	RDML, USN (ret)
July 7, 2023	June 30, 2025	Mike Dumont	VADM, USN (ret)	interim president
July 1, 2025	incumbent	Eric C. Jones	RADM, USCG (ret)	

1. Dwyer was replaced by Nichols due to Navy requirements for regular Navy officers to be in charge of Navy-owned ships.
2. During WWII, superintendent and master became separate positions.
3. Edwin C. Miller was appointed interim superintendent, and served from October 1971 to July 1972.
4. On February 27, 1975, the title of "superintendent" was changed to "president".

=== Training ships ===
From	To	Name	Former name
1931	1946	TS California State / TS Golden State	USS Henry County (IX-34)
1946	1971	TS Golden Bear	USS Mellena (AKA-32)
1971	1995	TS Golden Bear II	USS Crescent City (APA-21)
1996	Present	TS Golden Bear III	USNS Maury (T-AGS-39)
2026		NSMV V (temporary name)	

== Academics ==
Academic rankings

Baccalaureate
- Washington Monthly: 1

Regional
- U.S. News & World Report: 2

2023–2024 USNWR Best Regional Colleges West Rankings
Top Public Schools	1
Top Performers on Social Mobility	15
Best Undergraduate Engineering Programs	58 (At schools where doctorate not offered)

Cal Poly Maritime academic programs are tied to a nautical curriculum. An undergraduate Oceanography major was added in fall 2020. As of fall 2018 then-Cal Maritime had the largest enrollment percentage of Pacific Islander Americans and multiracial Americans.

=== Rankings ===
Money magazine ranked Cal Maritime 15th in the country for value out of 623 schools it evaluated for its 2022 Best Colleges in America ranking.

In 2019 Forbes ranked Cal Maritime as the 309th top college in the nation and 64th in the West.

The 2021 U.S. News & World Report college rankings lists Cal Maritime as the No. 1 "Top Public College" and tied for 2nd out of 102 schools in the category "Regional Colleges (West)".

In 2024, Washington Monthly ranked Cal Maritime 1st among 223 colleges that award almost exclusively bachelor's degrees in the U.S. based on its contribution to the public good, as measured by social mobility, research, and promoting public service. In 2024, Washington Monthly ranked Wesleyan College 3rd in the social mobility and 2nd in the service among bachelor's colleges.

According to a study by the Equality of Opportunity Project, the Cal Maritime had the best results of any California college in helping transform students whose parents were relatively poor (bottom 20 percent of the income bracket) into adults who are relatively wealthy (top 20 percent income) within a decade after graduation. 85% of poor students eventually became relatively wealthy. However, only 6% of the students came from poor families.

== Corps of Cadets ==
Undergraduate demographics as of fall 2023
Race and ethnicity	Total
White	48%
Hispanic	22%
Asian	11%
Two or more races	10%
Black	3%
Unknown	2%
Native American	1%
Pacific Islander	1%
Economic diversity
Low-income (Note: The percentage of students who received an income-based federal Pell grant intended for low-income students.)	22%
Affluent (Note: The percentage of students who are a part of the American middle class at the bare minimum.)	78%

Cal Poly Maritime is the United States' only maritime academy on the West Coast, and requires all undergraduate students to participate in the Corps of Cadets. The only similar program in the Western United States is at the junior college New Mexico Military Institute. Since maritime academies comply with Title 46 Part 310 of the Code of Federal Regulations, students are referred to as "cadets", are required to wear uniforms, and utilize a demerit-based disciplinary system. Participation in Navy Reserve Merchant Marine training program is no longer required, but cadets still utilize Merchant Marine Navy-style uniforms, customs, and traditions. Based on academic majors cadets are organized into squads, sections, divisions and companies, which regularly muster in morning formations several times a week, as well as stand watches on campus and aboard the training ship.

=== Military options ===
There is no armed service obligation attached to graduation from the Cal Poly Maritime. However, financial aid and additional career opportunities exist for those students who choose to participate in any of the several military programs available on the Cal Poly Maritime campus:

- Coast Guard – Auxiliary University Program, Maritime Academy Graduate Program
- Navy – Strategic Sealift Officer Program
- Navy – Reserve Officer Training Corps
- Marine Corps – Reserve Officer Training Corps
- Air Force – Reserve Officer Training Corps

== Athletics ==
The Cal Poly Maritime athletics teams are called the Keelhaulers (formerly known as the "Seawolves"). The academy is a member of the National Association of Intercollegiate Athletics (NAIA), primarily competing in the California Pacific Conference (Cal Pac) since the 1996–97 academic year.

Cal Poly Maritime competes in 14 intercollegiate varsity sports: Men's sports include basketball, crew, cross country, golf, rugby, soccer and water polo; while women's sports include basketball, crew, cross country, golf, soccer and water polo; and co-ed sports include sailing.

=== History ===
Cal Poly Maritime has a long history of athletic activities. Before it joined regular intercollegiate athletics, sports teams from Cal Maritime usually played military teams from local bases. In the 1970s, Cal Maritime began to organize its sports under intercollegiate guidelines, and the student body chose the "Keelhauler" as the academy's mascot. Until then, the academy's teams were known as the Seawolves.

=== Mascot/nickname ===
The Keelhauler mascot was chosen as Cal Poly Maritime's athletic mascot by cadets in 1974, the name taken from a form of corporal punishment that was formerly used in the Dutch and English navies. Keelhauling involved tying the hands of a crewmember to a rope and hauling him under the keel of the ship. While the practice of keelhauling was formally abolished in 1853, the Keelhauler lives on as the official mascot of Cal Poly Maritime athletics.

=== Accomplishments ===
Cal Poly Maritime's rugby program was started in 1998 and gained varsity status in 2001. Rugby was at one time the school's most successful sport, going undefeated against Division II opponents in home matches from 2007 to 2010. Cal Poly Maritime's rugby team has been nationally ranked in college rugby, won the Pacific Coast League's Western Division Championship in 2009 and 2010, and was the runner up in the 2012 championship of the National Small College Rugby Organization. During the 2004–2005 academic year, the women's basketball team was formed and now also competes in the CalPac.

The academy's sailing team captured their first Kennedy Cup – the National Collegiate Sailing Championship – in the fall of 2009. That victory earned it the right to serve as the U.S. representative in the annual Student World Yachting Cup championships in October 2010 in La Rochelle, France, where it placed 5th of 14.

The sailing team won the Kennedy Cup again in 2013, 2015, 2021 and 2022.

In 2012, the Varsity 4+ of the men's crew team took first place in its event at the Head of the American Regatta. It beat teams from UC Berkeley, UC Davis, CSU Sacramento, CSU Long Beach, Humboldt State University, Saint Mary's College of California, Sonoma State University, and the University of the Pacific. At the 2013 WIRA championships, the men's pair placed 2nd out of 16, while the men's novice 4+ placed 6th out of 19. Also in 2012, Cal Maritime added a men's cross country running team that finished 5th out of eight teams in the Cal Pac Conference.

In 2014, Cal Maritime added a women's water polo team, followed by a women's soccer team in 2018.

=== Spirit ===
In the fall of 2022, Cal Maritime Athletics formed a student run spirit group dubbed "The Watch", playing homage to "watch standing", the main duty of deck and engine officers on ships.

== Notable alumni ==
- Ryan T. Holte (Class of 2005), judge, United States Court of Federal Claims
- Kate McCue (Class of 2000), Celebrity Cruises captain
- Andy Reid (did not graduate), professional football coach
- Jamila Reinhardt (Class of 2012), rugby union player

== See also ==
- United States Maritime Administration
- United States service academies
- Maritime Academy
- United States Merchant Marine
- Senior Military College
