= TS Golden Bear =

US university training ship

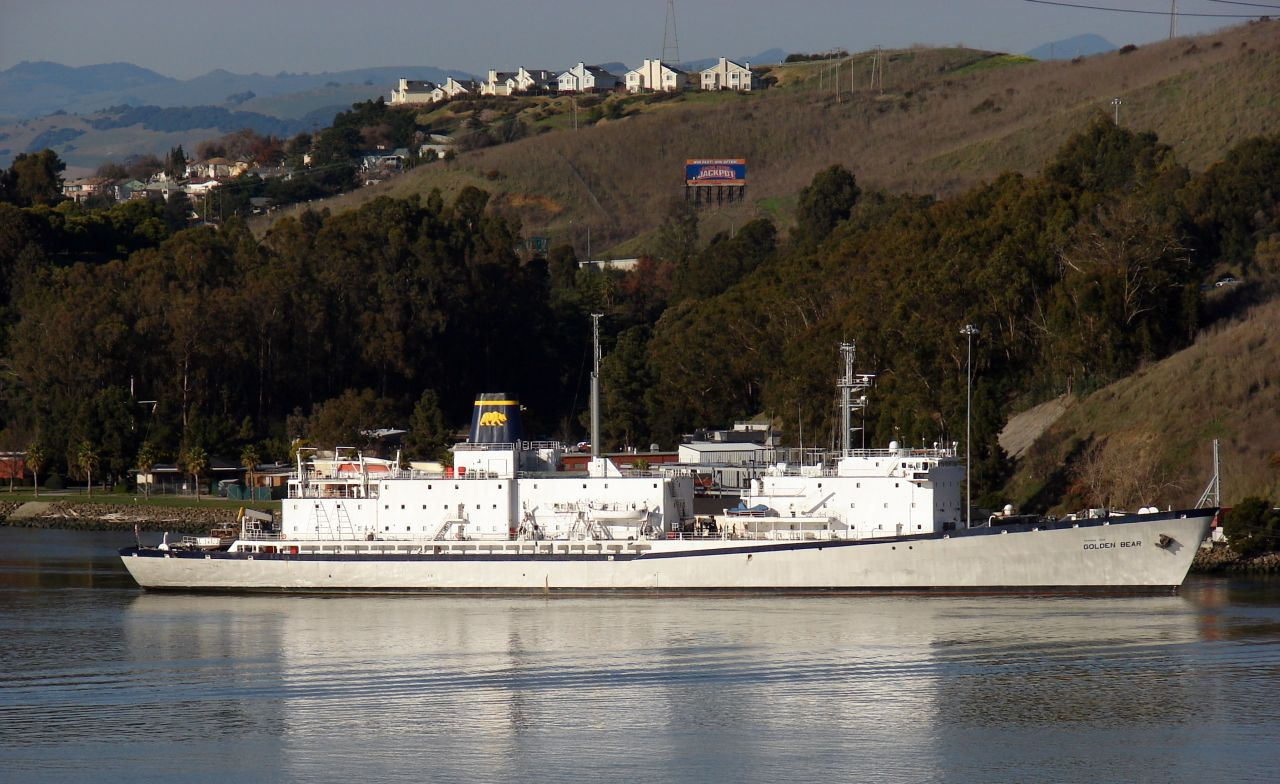
- The third T.S. Golden Bear docked alongside the then–California Maritime Academy on February 17, 2007

History

United States
- Name: Maury
- Ordered: June 28, 1985
- Builder: Bethlehem Steel
- Cost: US$65,000,000
- Laid down: July 29, 1986
- Launched: September 4, 1987
- Commissioned: March 31, 1989
- Out of service: September 1994, laid up in the Suisun Bay Reserve Fleet
- Renamed: Golden Bear
- Fate: Transferred to MARAD in 1994

United States
- Name: Golden Bear
- Namesake: California golden bear
- Owner: United States Maritime Administration
- Operator: California State Univ. Maritime Academy
- Reinstated: May 4, 1996 as TS Golden Bear
- Home port: Vallejo, California
- Identification: IMO number: 8834407; MMSI number: 367978000; Callsign: WDL2000
- Status: Active
- Badge

General characteristics
- Type: Training ship
- Tonnage: 10,939 long tons (11,115 t)
- Displacement: 9,319 long tons (9,469 t) light; 15,821 long tons (16,075 t) full
- Length: 499 ft 10 in (152.35 m)
- Beam: 72 ft (22 m)
- Height: 151 ft (46 m)
- Draft: 30 ft 6 in (9.30 m)
- Propulsion: R5-V16 twin diesels, 17,000 shp (12,677 kW), single five-blade propeller, 18 ft 7 1/2 in (5.68 m) diameter
- Speed: 20 knots (37 km/h; 23 mph)
- Range: 17,820 miles (28,680 km)
- Crew: 288

TS Golden Bear is the training ship of the California State University Maritime Academy (CSUMA), a campus of the California State University. The first training ship of the then–California Nautical School was known as the Training Ship California State, then as the TS Golden State. Since then, there have been three ships to bear the name TS Golden Bear.

The current Golden Bear was transferred to the United States Maritime Administration (MARAD) from the US Navy in 1994. She was converted for use by the then–California Maritime Academy and transferred there in 1996. Her sister ship, the TS State of Maine (formerly USNS Tanner) currently resides as the training ship of Maine Maritime Academy.

== TS Golden State ==
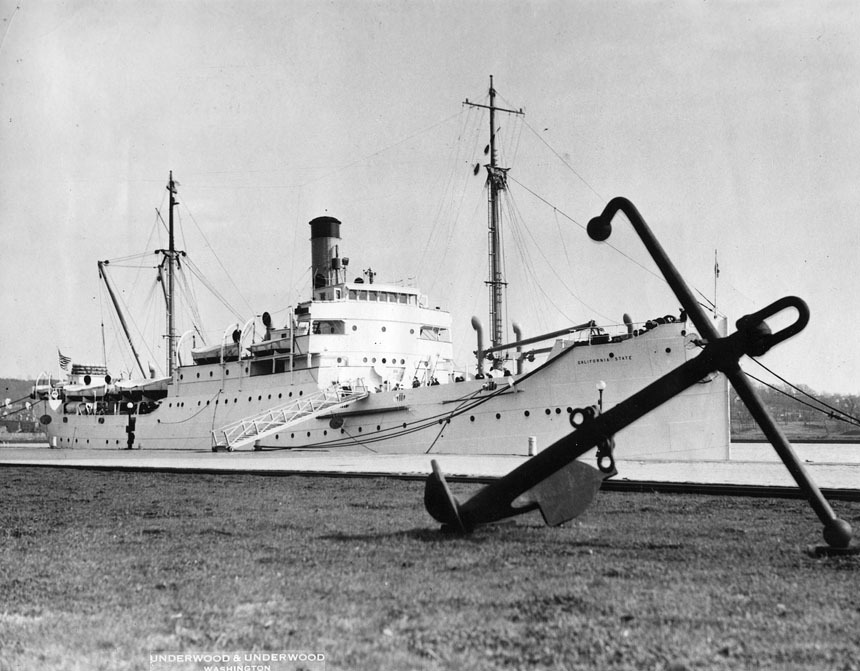
TS Golden State at Washington Navy Yard, April 7, 1932

The first training ship of the California Maritime Academy was the TS Golden State. Originally planned to be named the SS Lake Fellowship, after construction, the ship was launched on October 18, 1919. After completion, she entered service in November 1920 as the SS Henry County. In the mid-1920s, the Henry County was placed out of service in the James River Reserve Fleet.

The Navy purchased the ship in 1930 and transferred it to the then-named California Nautical School. Entering service as the CTS California State on January 23, 1931, the cadets who lived aboard quickly gave her the nickname "Iron Mother." In December 1941, the ship was renamed the TS Golden State. She sailed on 12 major ocean cruises, including one around the world in 1933. She was also in service when the California Nautical School became the California Maritime Academy.

After being taken out of service on August 12, 1946, she was placed in the National Defense Reserve Fleet at Suisun Bay, California. In 1948, she was sold into private trade, and was operated under various names including Isle of Patmos and Santa Rosa until she was scrapped in Brazil in August 1962.

== First TS Golden Bear ==
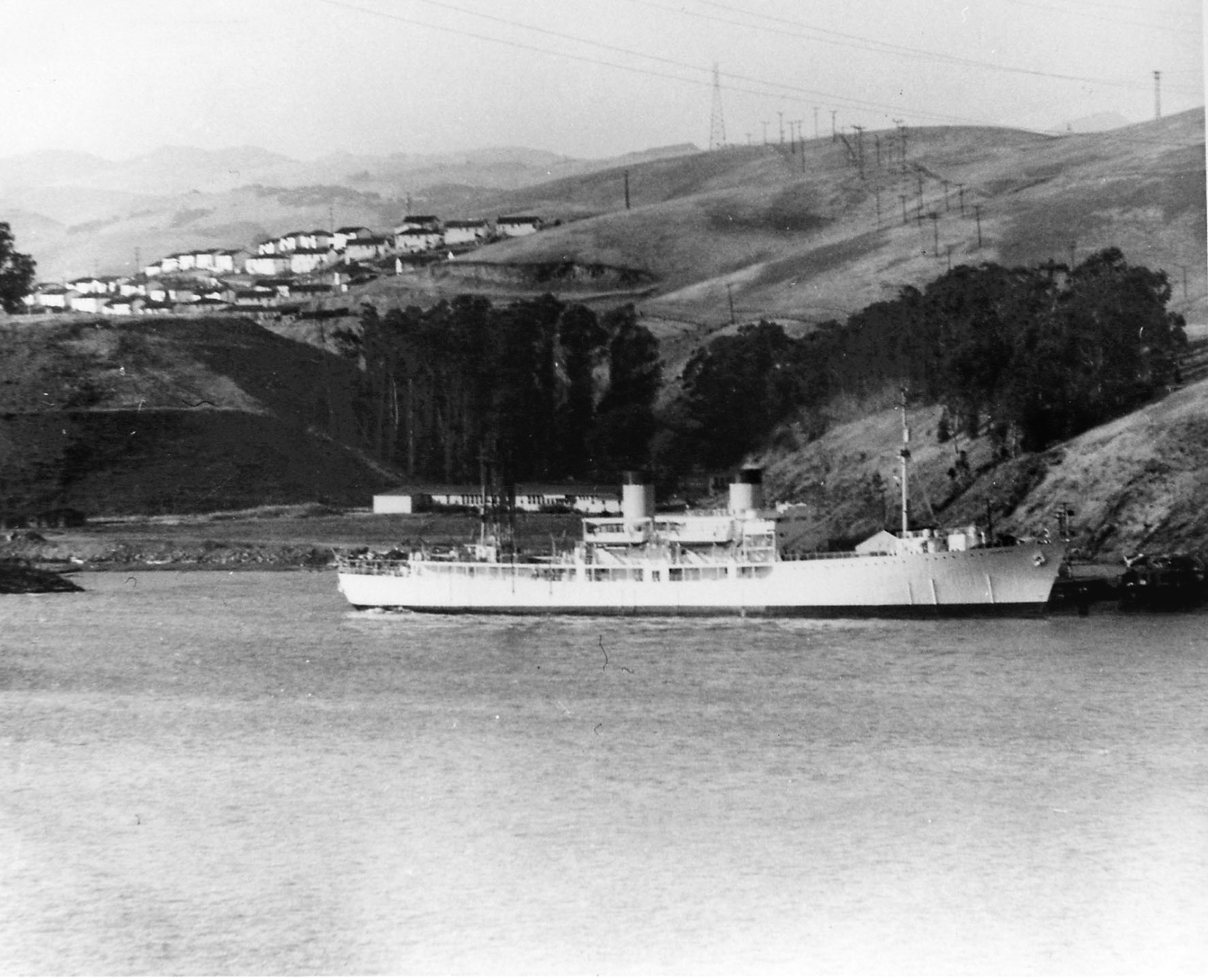
TS Golden Bear at the California Maritime Academy

On September 25, 1944, the keel was laid for USS Mellena, the twelfth Artemis-class attack cargo ship, at the Walsh-Kaiser Company Shipyard in Providence, Rhode Island. She was hull #1893. After construction, she was launched on December 11, 1944, and commissioned as the USS Mellena (AKA-32) on January 10, 1945. After serving the Navy in the Western Pacific during World War II, she was decommissioned on June 11, 1946, at Mare Island Naval Shipyard. Immediately after her decommissioning, she was transferred to the CMA and commissioned as the Training Ship Golden Bear on September 7, 1946.

After serving as the TS Golden Bear, and sailing on 24 major ocean cruises, the first Golden Bear was decommissioned on May 14, 1971, and then sold for scrap.

== Second TS Golden Bear ==
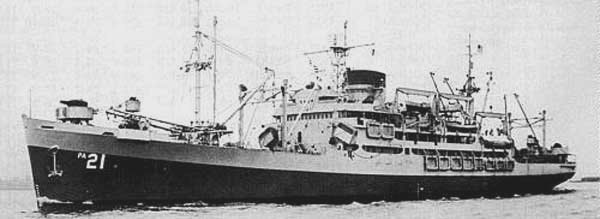
TS Golden Bear II

Originally named the SS Delorleans, the ship was contracted on December 16, 1938, by Maritime Commission as a Type C3 ship hull #49. The keel was laid May 8, 1939, by the Bethlehem Steel Company, Sparrows Point Maryland, where she was launched on February 17, 1940, and delivered to Delta Lines on August 23, 1940. This was the third of a series of six ships designed by the Mississippi Shipping Company, as a modification of the standard C3 design, to carry both passengers and cargo between New Orleans, Louisiana and Buenos Aires on the so-called "Coffee Run". Twenty six staterooms accommodated 67 passengers on the shelter deck.

The US Government requisitioned the Delorleans on June 3, 1941. The Navy assumed control on June 9, 1941, and stripped the ship to prepare her for war duty, and she was commissioned on October 10, 1941, as the USS Crescent City. After involvement in almost all the major campaigns in the Western Pacific during World War II, the Crescent City was redesignated as APA-21 in 1943. Before being decommissioned at San Francisco, on April 30, 1948, she earned a Navy Unit Commendation and ten battle stars for her service in World War II.

The ship was transferred to CMA in May 1971, for conversion to a training ship. She was commissioned in June 1971 as the TS Golden Bear, then sailed on 28 major ocean cruises, over 24 years. The "Golden Bear II" was decommissioned in 1995 and placed in the reserve fleet. In 1999, the City of Oakland, California purchased the ship and renamed it "Artship" as part of a failed art colony project. She was sold for scrap in 2004, but dismantling was halted because of high PCB levels and because she was considered too historic. Thereafter, she was privately owned and plans were put in place to convert her into a culinary school and maritime museum. She had been laid up at Mare Island Naval Shipyard in Vallejo, California since 2004 pending these plans.

On November 7, 2011, she was publicly auctioned and sold to Esco Marine, Inc. She was renamed Pacific Star and she departed Mare Island for scrapping at Brownsville, Texas on January 15, 2012.

== Third TS Golden Bear ==
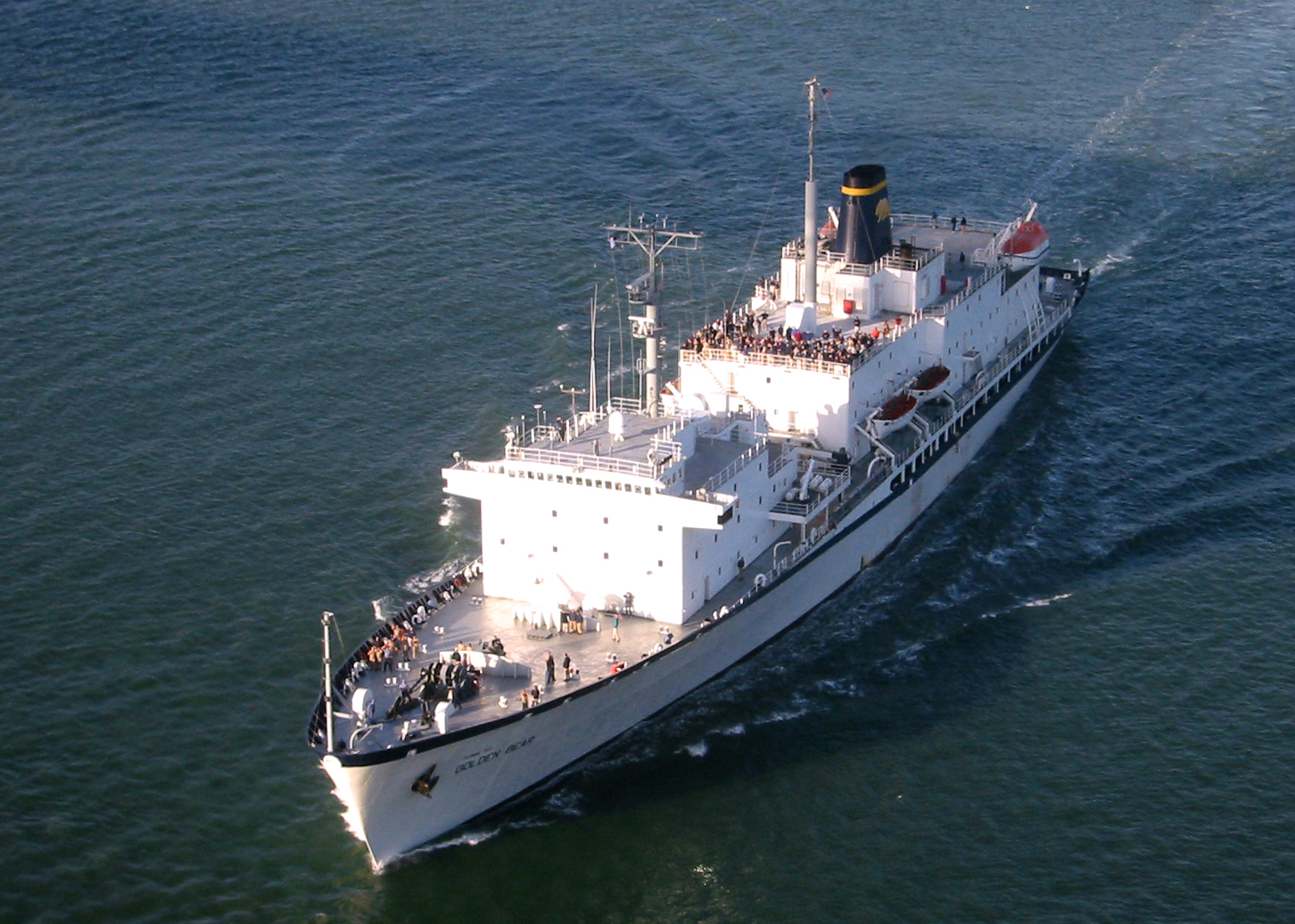
Passing under the Golden Gate Bridge on the way out of San Francisco Bay

On July 29, 1986, the keel was laid for hull #4667, ordered under a MARAD contract for the United States Navy, at Bethlehem Steel in Sparrows Point, Maryland. After launching on September 4, 1987, she was delivered to the Navy on March 31, 1989, and entered service as the USNS Maury (T-AGS-39). At the time, Maury was the fastest and largest oceanographic ship in the United States fleet. She also featured a number of advanced oceanographic tools and technologies, including a "multi-beam, wide-angle precision sonar for continuous charting of a broad strip of ocean floor under the ship's track." In addition, the main engines, two Enterprise R5 V-16 diesel engines, were mounted on "rafts", isolated from the hull by rubber cushions, similar in nature to the acoustic isolation aboard nuclear submarines.

The Maury was placed "out of service" in September 1994, and laid up in the Suisun Bay Reserve Fleet in California. On October 1, 1994, she was stricken from the Navy rolls and transferred to MARAD under agreement that she would be transferred to CMA after retrofitting. After conversion of the living spaces aboard, she was transferred to California Maritime Academy on May 4, 1996 and rechristened as the TS Golden Bear. Since that time, the ship has almost continuously undergone substantial repairs, remodeling and improvements, including periodic drydock inspections and overhauls. In early 2009, additional staterooms were installed, along with a supplemental MSD (Marine Sewage Device), and both the ship's gym and library were renovated. Construction projects include an enclosed simulation laboratory for navigation training atop the 04 deck and refurbishment of the cadet living quarters on the 01 and 02 decks.
