= SM radar =

Radar of the United States Navy

SM (radar)
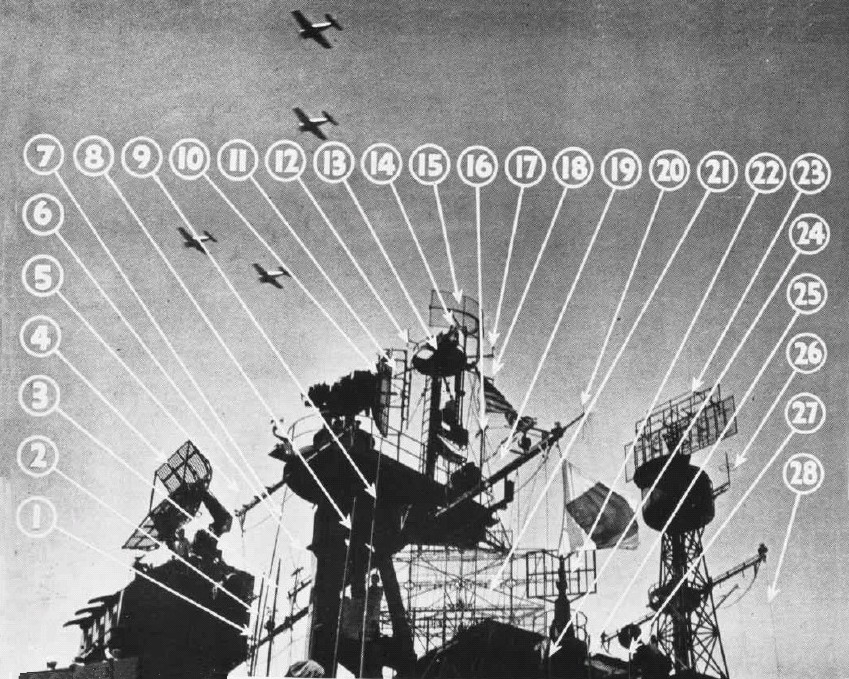
- SM (No. 10) aboard USS Lexington
- Country of origin: United States
- Manufacturer: General Electric
- Introduced: 1943
- No. built: 23
- Type: Fighter-direction radar
- Frequency: A/G-band
- PRF: 775–825 Hz
- Pulsewidth: 1 μs
- Range: 35 mi (30.4 nmi)
- Precision: 200 yd (0.1 nmi), 3 °
- Power: 45–65 kW

SM was an American made fighter-direction radar used for the ship ground-controlled interception (GCI) during World War II by the United States Navy. Variation included the SM-1.

== SM radar ==
Microwave set with three axis stabilized antenna, installed on aircraft carriers to search for enemy planes, particularly low-flying and shadow planes, and to supply height, speed and course data so that a Fighter Director Officer can direct fighters to an interception. It can also be used to search for ships and periscopes. SM is correlated with search sets, such as SK, and with radio communication to planes. There are provisions for A and G-band IFF, and a built-in BO antenna. For night interception, AI is required in planes.

SM has a reliable detection range of 35 miles (56 km) on a medium bomber 500 ft (150 m) above optical horizon as surfaced submarines can be followed to horizon. Periscopes can be seen 6 miles (9.7 km) or more, and buoys can be seen up to the horizon. Range can be determined to ±200 yd (180 m), or 1/4%, whichever is greater. Bearing can be determined to ±1/2°. Elevation can be determined to ±1/3° if an airplane is 2 1/2° or more above optical horizon. If the plane is lower, data is less reliable. Accuracy of range difference between two targets is ±50 yd (46 m) for separation of 500–10,000 yd (460–9,140 m). Elevation limit is 90°.

Spares, testing equipment and separate generator supplied. SM has 23 components weighing a total of about 9 tons. The largest unit is the antenna mount, at 131 in (3.3 m) high, with a diameter of 67 in (1.7 m) at base, and weighing about 4,600 lb (2,100 kg). The antenna is 6 ft (1.8 m) in diameter; 8-foot (2.4 m) antennas will be installed on later sets. The console, 76 ft × 65 ft × 24 ft (23.2 m × 19.8 m × 7.3 m) in dimensions and 1,800–2,000 lb (820–910 kg) in weight, splits into 3 parts for installation. Minimum operators per shift required are two, plus one assistant radar officer. Recommended personnel: 15 per day. Power required is 45-65 kW, 440 V, 3-phase, 60 Hz, supplied by motor–generator set, or, in emergencies, from ship's supply.

USS Lexington (CV-16) was equipped with the first prototype of SM radar in March 1943, while USS Enterprise (CV-6) and USS Bunker Hill (CV-17) were equipped with the first two production models in October of the same year. 26 SM-1 variants were all produced and leased to the Royal Navy. SM was developed from the SCR-584 radar.

=== On board ships ===
==== United States ====
- Essex-class aircraft carrier
- USS Enterprise (CV-6)
- USS Saratoga (CV-3)

==== United Kingdom ====
- HMS Boxer (F121)
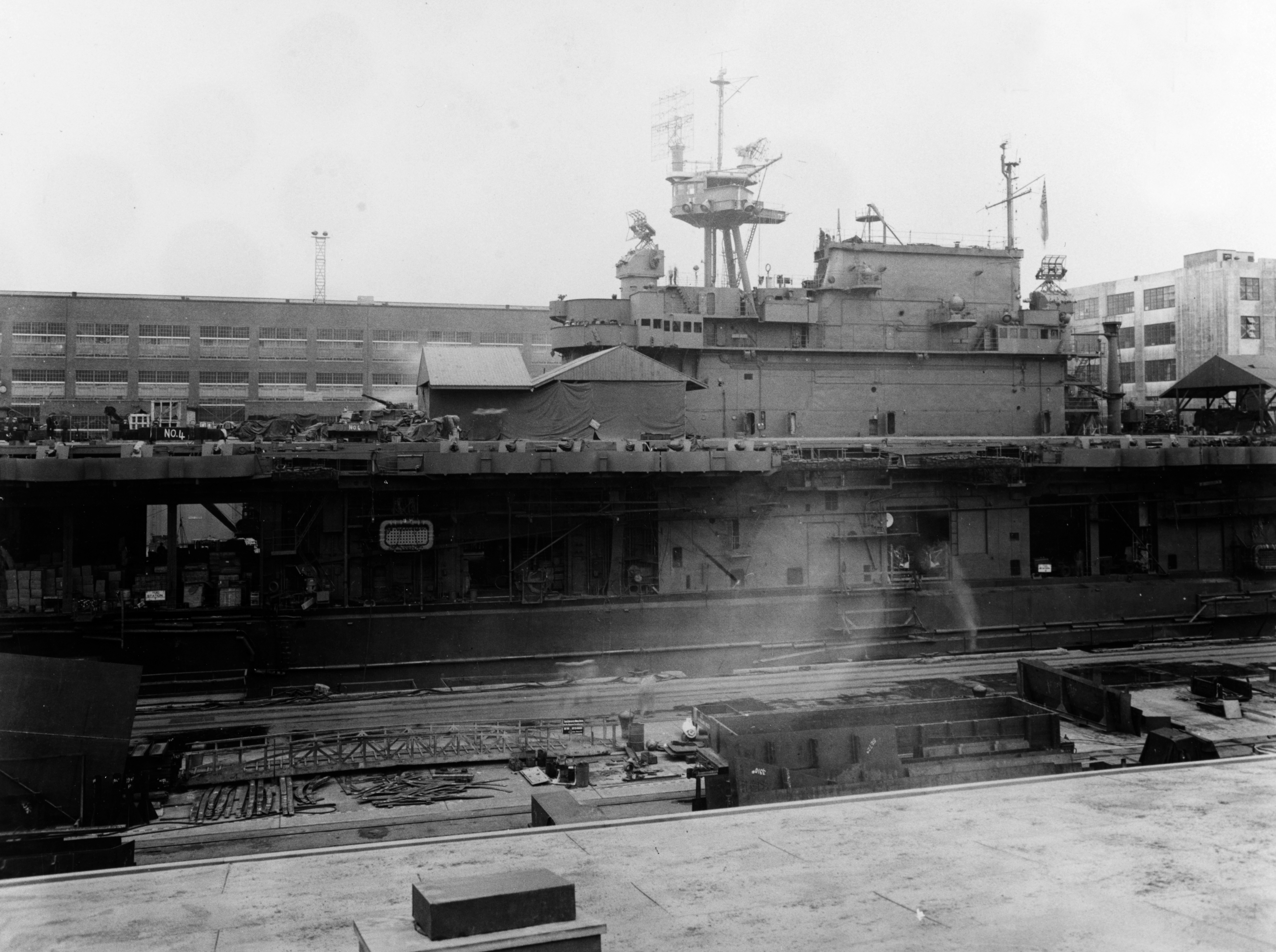
SM aboard USS Enterprise

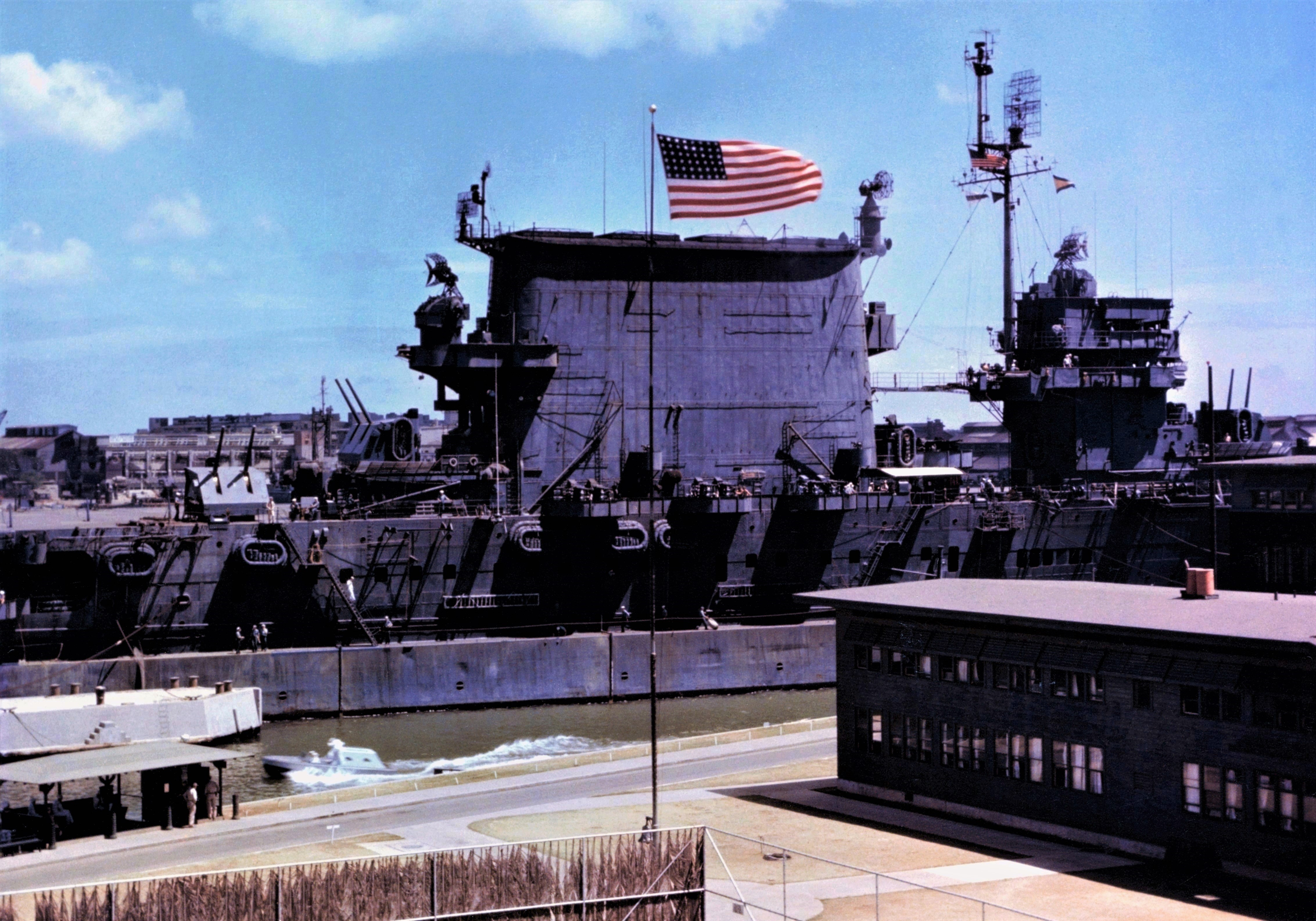
SM aboard USS Saratoga

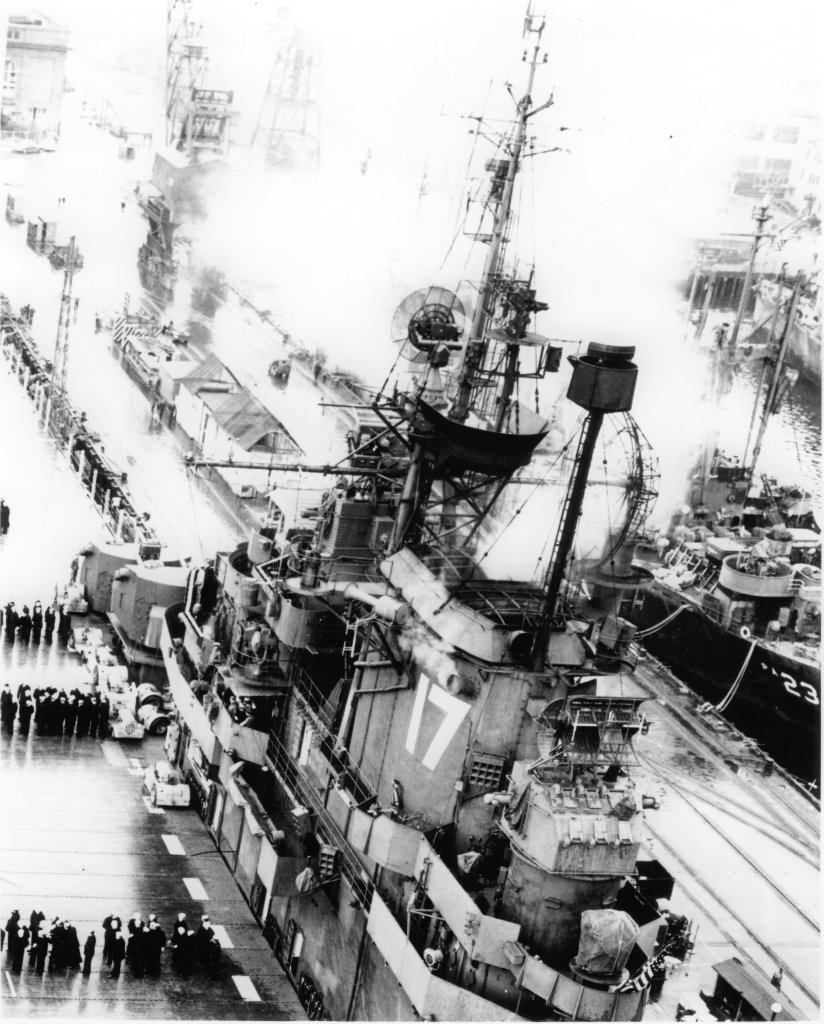
SM aboard USS Bunker Hill

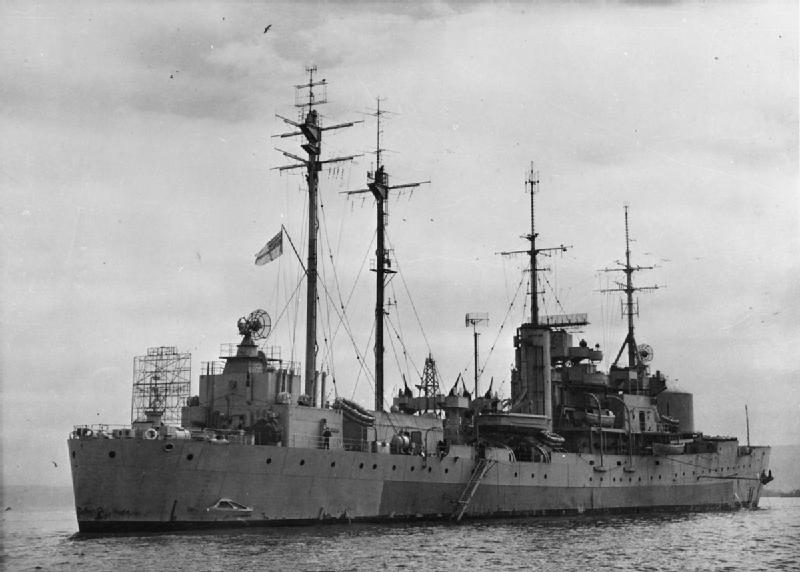
SM-1 aboard HMS Boxer

== SP radar ==
SP or CXDT was the lightweight version of the SM radar. It replaced the SK radar in the later stages of the war.

=== On board ships ===
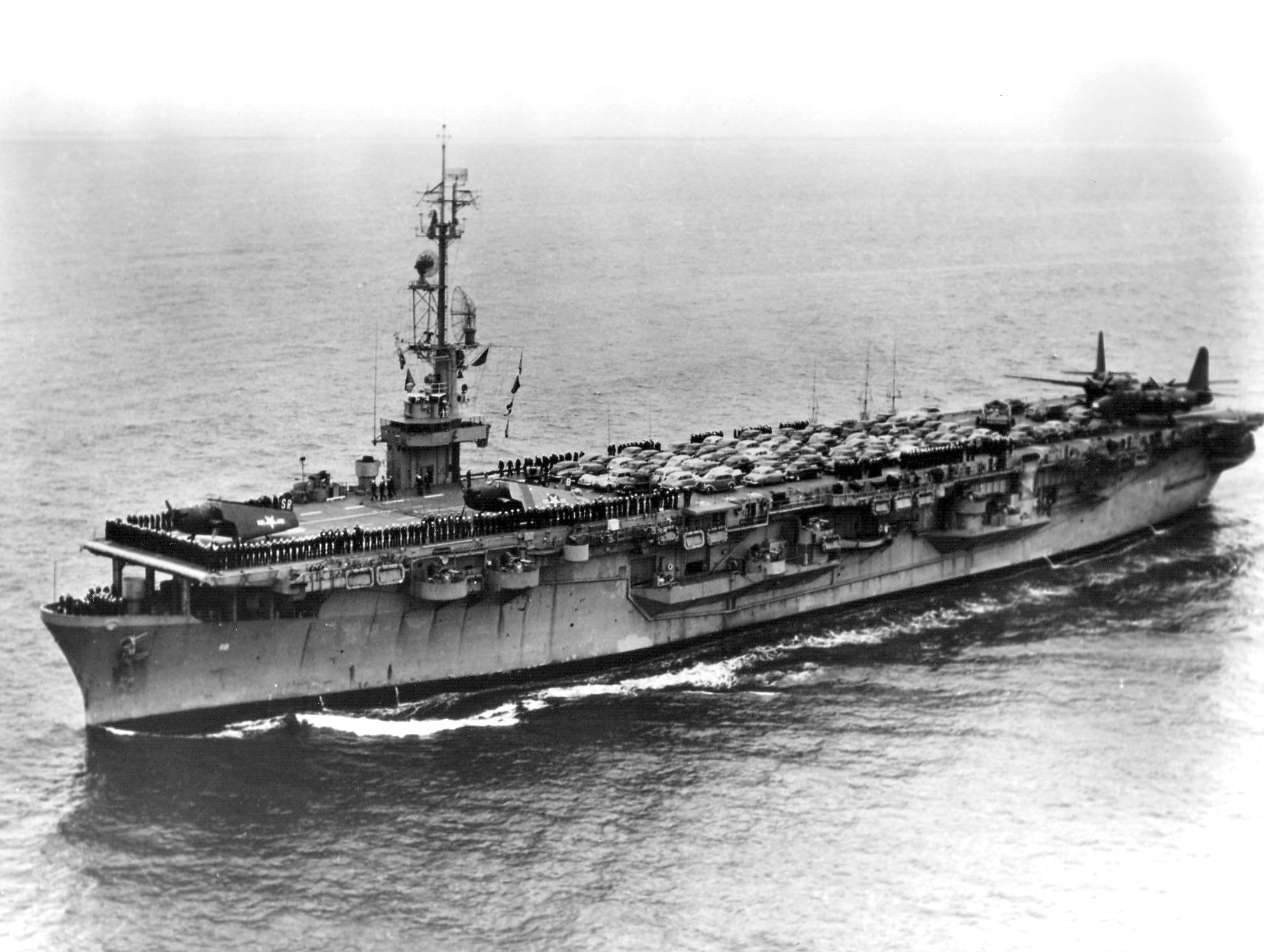
SP aboard USS Sicily

==== United States ====
- Saipan-class aircraft carrier
- Independence-class aircraft carrier
- Commencement Bay-class escort carrier
- Iowa-class battleship
- North Carolina-class battleship
- USS California (BB-44)
- USS Pennsylvania (BB-38)
- Des Moines-class cruiser
- Gearing-class destroyer
- Porter-class destroyer
- Buckley-class destroyer escort
- Adirondack-class command ship
- Mount McKinley-class command ship

==== France ====
- Jean Bart (1940)
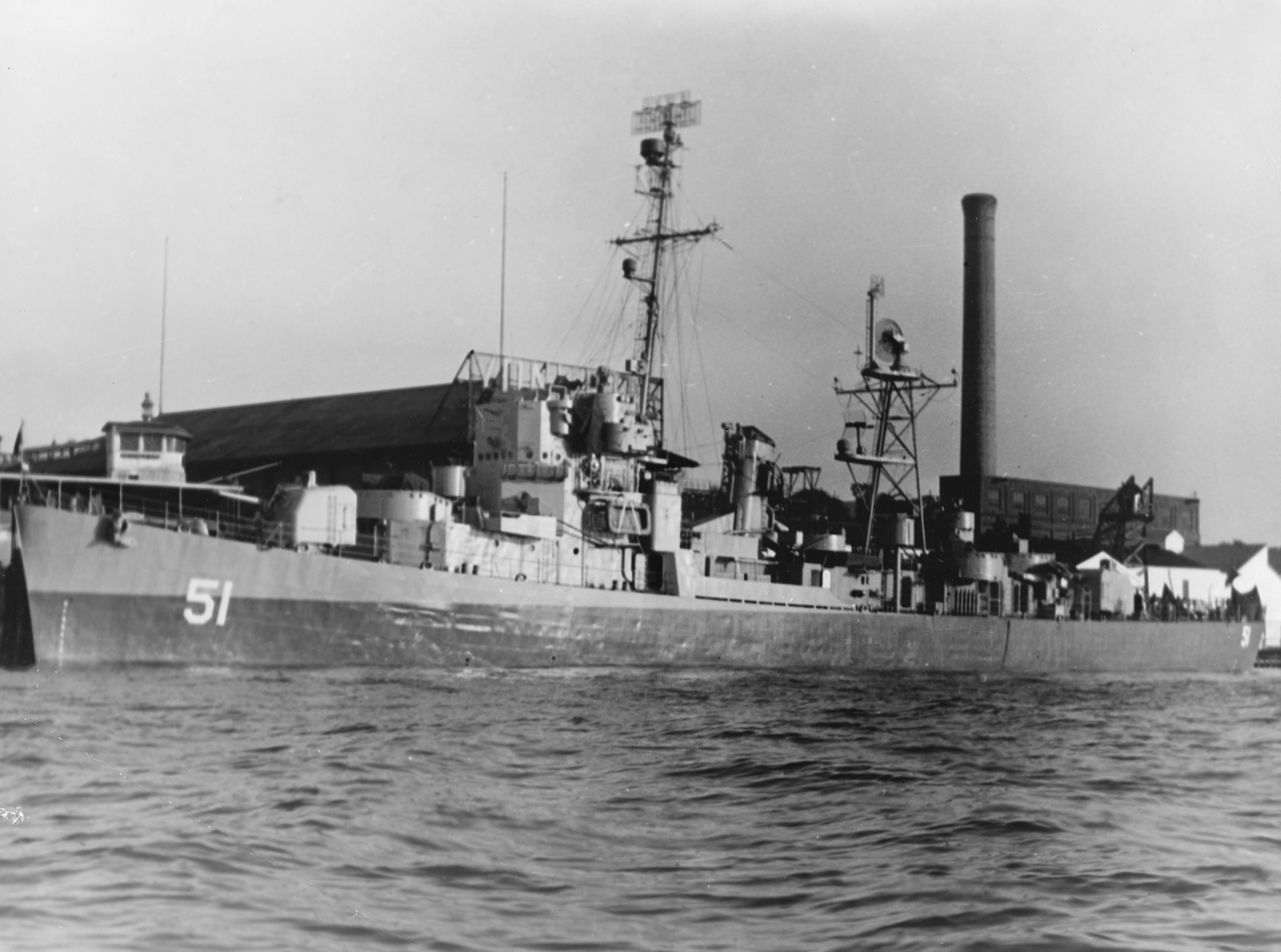
SP aboard USS Buckley

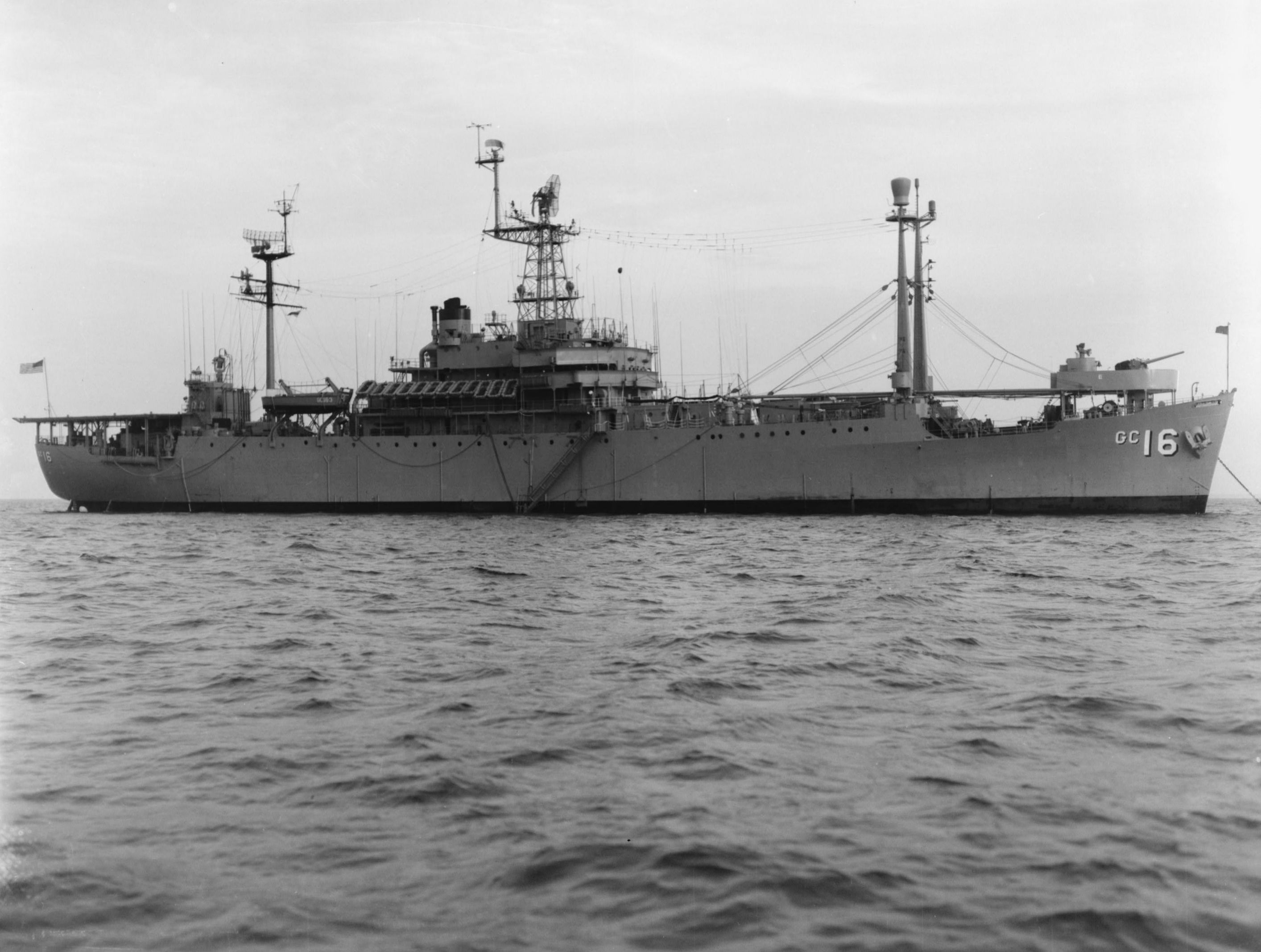
SP aboard USS Pocono

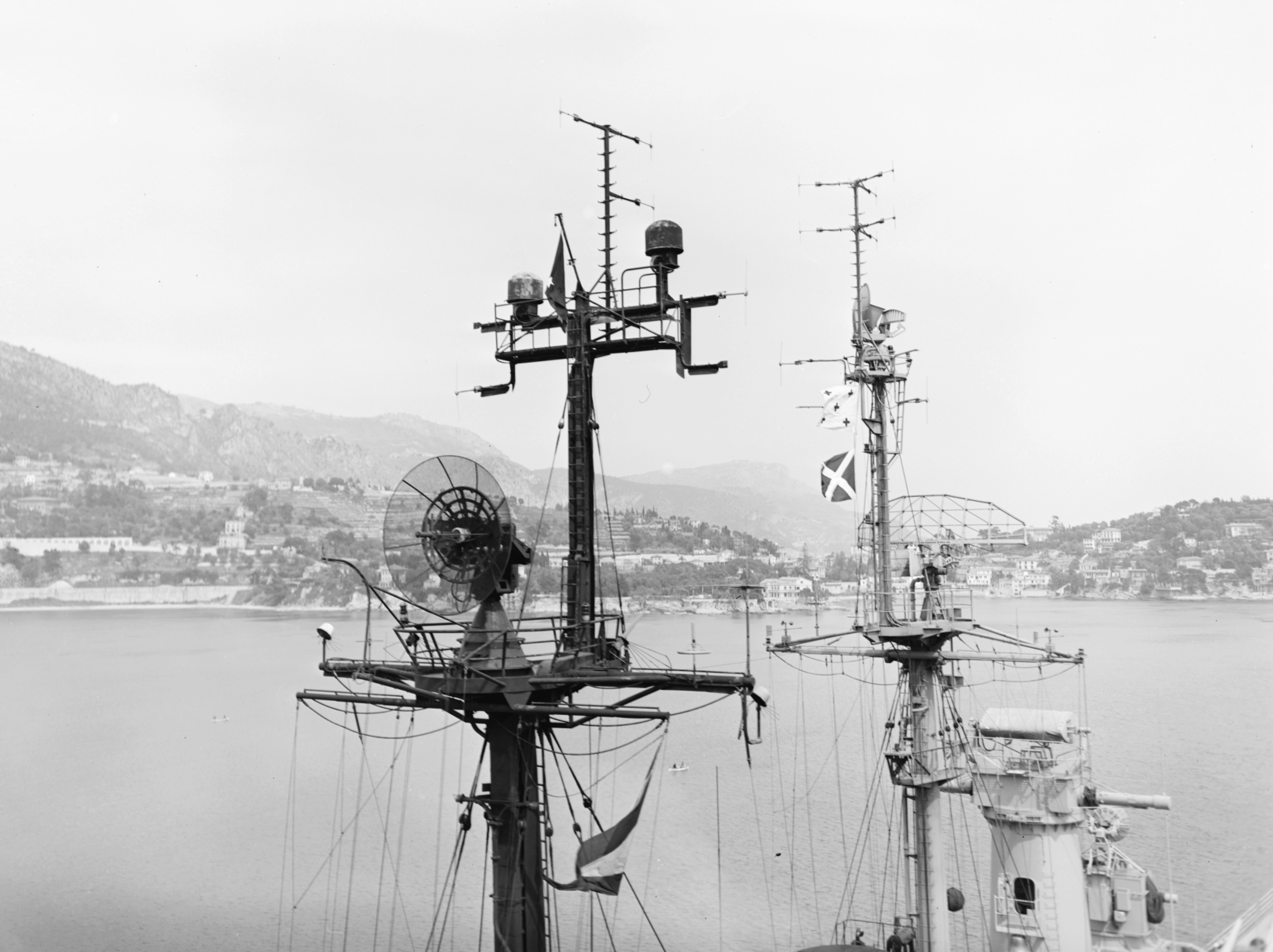
SP aboard USS Newport News

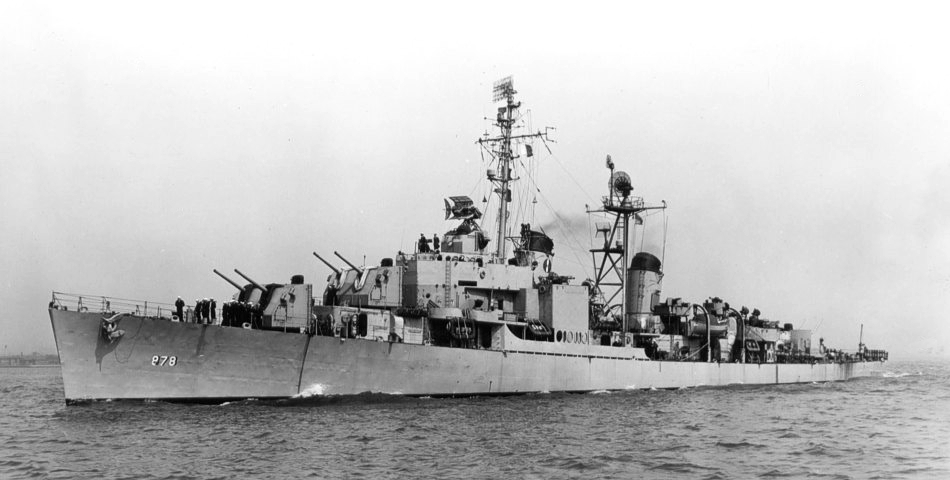
SP aboard USS Vesole

== See also ==
- List of radars
- Radar configurations and types
- Air-search radar
