= North Carolina-class battleship =

US Navy fast battleship class (1937–1947)

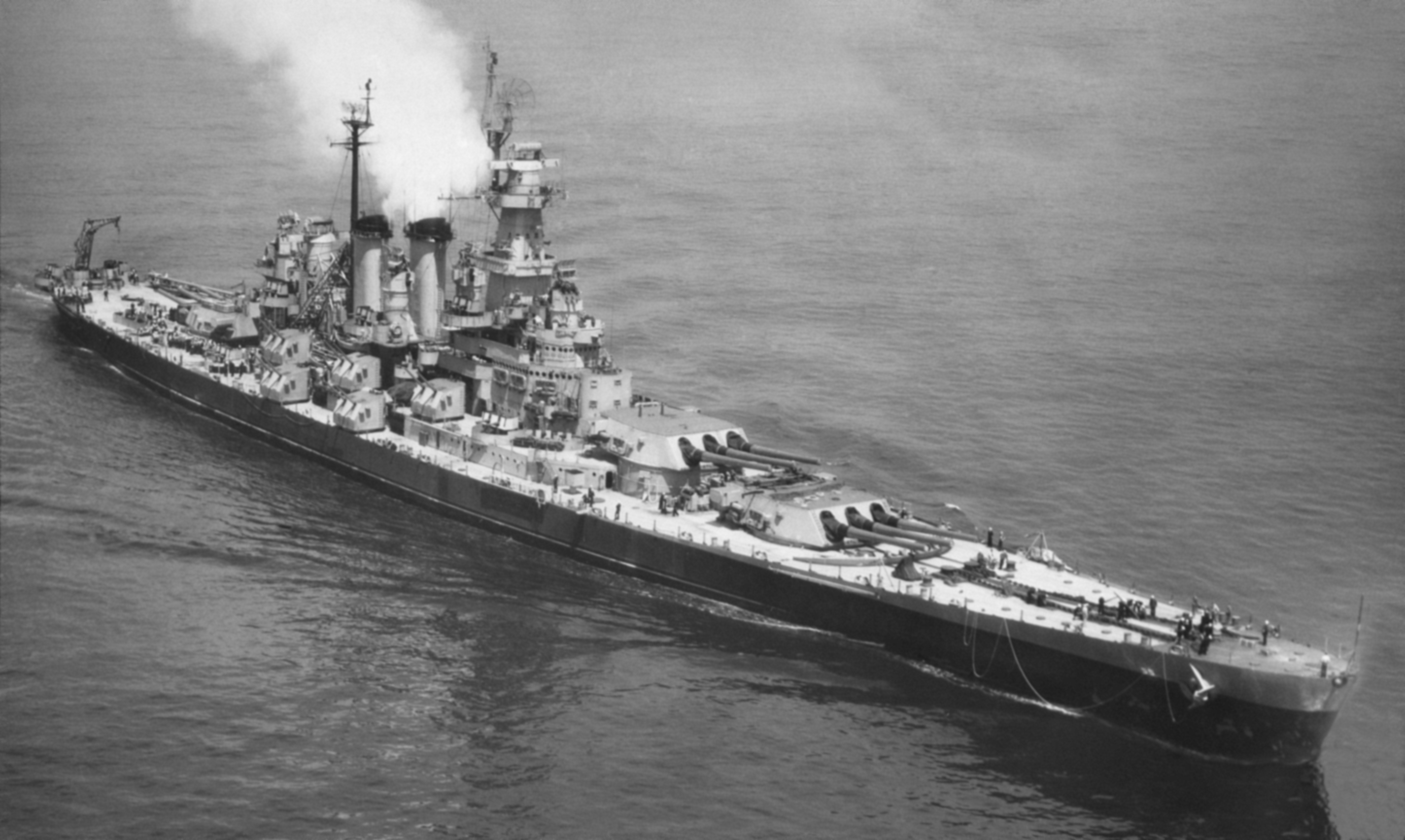
- North Carolina underway on 3 June 1946. By this time, many of the light anti-aircraft weapons (Bofors 40 mm and Oerlikon 20 mm) mounted during the war had been removed, while more modern radars had been mounted on its fore and main masts.

Class overview
- Name: North Carolina-class battleship
- Builders: New York Naval Shipyard (North Carolina); Philadelphia Naval Shipyard (Washington)
- Operators: United States Navy
- Preceded by: South Dakota class (planned); Colorado class (actual)
- Succeeded by: South Dakota class
- Built: 1937–1941
- In service: 1941–1947
- Completed: 2
- Retired: 2
- Scrapped: 1
- Preserved: 1

General characteristics
- Class & type: Fast battleship
- Displacement: 36,600 long tons (37,187 t) (standard); 44,800 long tons (45,519 t) (full load)
- Length: 728 ft 8.625 in (222.113 m) overall
- Beam: 108 ft 3.875 in (33.017 m) maximum
- Draft: 35 ft 6 in (10.820 m) maximum
- Installed power: 8 × Babcock & Wilcox boilers; 121,000 shp (90,000 kW)
- Propulsion: four sets of General Electric geared turbines; 4 × screws
- Speed: 1941: 28 knots (52 km/h; 32 mph)
- Endurance: 17,450 nmi (20,080 mi; 32,320 km) at 15 knots (17 mph; 28 km/h)
- Crew: 108 officers; 1,772 men
- Sensors & processing systems: See the "Electronics" section
- Armament: 9 × 16 in (406 mm)/45 caliber Mark 6 guns (3 × 3); 20 × 5 in (127 mm)/38 caliber Mark 12 guns (10 × 2); Smaller weapons, like Bofors 40 mm or Oerlikon 20 mm, varied greatly; see the "Smaller weaponry" section
- Armor: Belt: 12 in (305 mm); Barbettes: 16 in (406 mm); Turrets: 16 in (406 mm); Decks: 1.45 in (37 mm), 5 in (127 mm), 0.62 in (16 mm); Conning tower: 12 in (305 mm)
- Aircraft carried: Vought OS2U Kingfisher; Curtiss SC-1 Seahawk (Note: The Seahawk replaced the Kingfisher around the end of the war.)

The North Carolina class was a class of two fast battleships, North Carolina and Washington, built for the United States Navy in the late 1930s and early 1940s.

In planning a new battleship class in the 1930s, the US Navy was heavily constrained by international treaty limitations, which included a requirement that all new capital ships have a standard displacement of under 35,000 LT (35,600 t). This restriction meant that the navy could not construct a ship with the firepower, armor, and speed that they desired, and the balancing uncertainty that resulted meant that the navy considered fifty widely varying designs.

Eventually, the General Board of the United States Navy declared its preference for a battleship with a speed of 30 knots (56 km/h; 35 mph), faster than any in US service, with a main battery of nine 14-inch (356 mm)/50 caliber Mark B guns. The board believed that these ships would be balanced enough to effectively take on a multitude of roles. However, the acting Secretary of the Navy authorized a modified version of a different design, which in its original form had been rejected by the General Board. This called for a 27-knot (50 km/h; 31 mph) ship with twelve 14-inch guns in quadruple turrets and protection against guns of the same caliber. In a major departure from traditional American design practices, this design prioritized firepower at the cost of speed and protection. After construction had begun, the United States invoked a so-called "escalator clause" in the international treaty to increase the class' main armament to nine 16-inch (406 mm)/45 caliber Mark 6 guns.

Both North Carolina and Washington saw extensive service during the Second World War in a variety of roles, primarily in the Pacific Theater where they escorted fast carrier task forces, such as during the Battle of the Philippine Sea, and conducted shore bombardments. Washington also participated in a surface engagement, the Naval Battle of Guadalcanal, where its radar-directed main batteries fatally damaged the Japanese battleship Kirishima. Both battleships were damaged during the war, with North Carolina taking a torpedo hit in 1942 and Washington colliding with Indiana in 1944. After the end of the war, both ships remained in commission for a brief time before being laid up in reserve. In the early 1960s, North Carolina was sold to the state of North Carolina as a museum ship, and Washington was broken up for scrap.

== Background ==
After the end of the First World War, several navies continued and expanded naval construction programs that they had started during the conflict. The United States' 1916 program called for six Lexington-class battlecruisers and six South Dakota-class battleships; in December 1918, the administration of President Woodrow Wilson called for building an additional ten battleships and six battlecruisers. The 1919–1920 General Board proposals planned for slightly smaller, but still significant, acquisitions beyond the 1916 plan: two battleships and a battlecruiser for the fiscal year 1921, and three battleships, a battlecruiser, four aircraft carriers and thirty destroyers between the fiscal years 1922 and 1924. The United Kingdom was in the final stages of ordering eight capital ships (the G3 battlecruisers, with the first's keel laying in 1921, and N3-class battleships, to be laid down beginning in 1922). Imperial Japan was, by 1920, attempting to build up to an 8-8 standard of eight battleships and eight battlecruisers or cruisers with the Nagato, Tosa, Amagi, Kii and Number 13 classes. Two ships from these designs were to be laid down per year until 1928.

With the staggering costs associated with such programs, the United States' Secretary of State Charles Evans Hughes invited delegations from the major maritime powers—France, Italy, Japan, and the United Kingdom—to come together in Washington, D.C. to discuss, and hopefully end, the naval arms race. The subsequent Washington Naval Conference resulted in the 1922 Washington Naval Treaty. Along with many other provisions, it limited all future battleships to a standard displacement of 35,000 long tons (36,000 t) and a maximum gun caliber of 16 inches. It also decreed that the five countries could not construct another capital ship for ten years and could not replace any ship that survived the treaty until it was at least twenty years old. The 1936 Second London Naval Treaty kept many of the Washington treaty's requirements but restricted gun size on new warships to 14 inches.

The treaties heavily influenced the design of the North Carolina class, as can be attested to in the long quest to find a ship that incorporated everything the US Navy considered necessary while remaining under 35,000 long tons.

== Design ==
=== Early ===
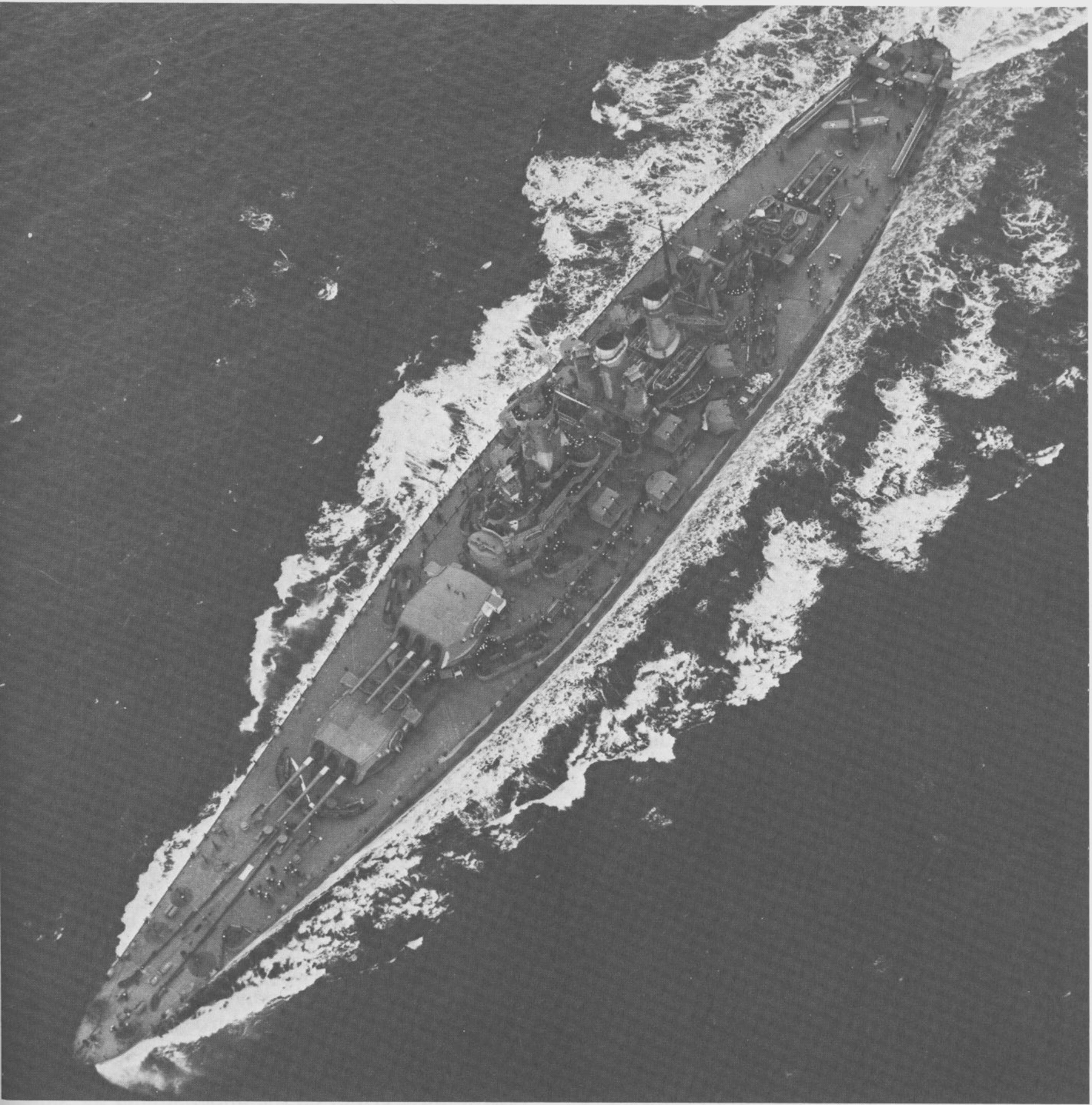
North Carolina seen from the air on 17 April 1942

With the end of the capital ship construction "holiday" approaching, the General Board began preparations for a new class of battleships in May–July 1935, and three design studies were submitted to them. "A" would be 32,150 long tons (32,666 t) armed with nine 14-inch (356 mm) guns in triple turrets, all forward of the bridge; capable of 30 knots; and armored against 14-inch shells. "B" and "C" would both be over 36,000 long tons (37,000 t), able to reach 30.5 kn (56.5 km/h; 35.1 mph), and armored against 14-inch shells. The major difference between the two was the planned main battery, as "B" had twelve 14-inch guns in triple turrets, while "C" had eight 16-inch/45-caliber guns in dual turrets. "A" was the only one to remain within the 35,000-ton displacement limit set in the Washington Naval Treaty and reaffirmed in the Second London Naval Treaty. When the Bureau of Ordnance introduced a "super-heavy" 16-inch shell, the ships were redesigned in an attempt to provide protection against it, but this introduced severe weight problems; two of the designs were nearly 5,000 long tons (5,100 t) over the treaty limit. (Note: This article uses Friedman's designations for the multitude of design proposals.)

Although these original three studies were all "fast" battleships, the General Board was not committed to the higher maximum speeds. It posed questions to the Naval War College, asking for their opinion as to whether the new class should be a "conventional" 23-knot (43 km/h; 26 mph) ship with an eight-nine, 16-inch main battery, or rather one akin to "A", "B" or "C".

Five more design studies were produced in late September 1935, which had characteristics of 23–30.5 knots, eight or nine 14- or 16-inch guns, and a standard displacement between 31,500 and 40,500 long tons (32,000 and 41,100 t). Designs "D" and "E" were attempts at fast battleships with 16-inch guns and protections against the same, but their displacement was greater than the Washington Naval Treaty allowed. Design "F" was a radical attempt at a hybrid battleship-carrier, with three catapults mounted fore and eight 14-inch guns aft. It was reportedly favored by President Franklin Delano Roosevelt, but as aircraft launched from catapults were necessarily inferior to most carrier- or land-based aircraft because of the floats used to land, nothing came of the design. Designs "G" and "H" were slower 23-knot ships with nine 14-inch guns; in particular, "H" was thought to be a very well balanced design by the Preliminary Design section of the Bureau of Construction and Repair. However, the General Board finally decided to use faster ships, which "G" and "H" were not.

These studies demonstrated the difficulty the designers faced with a displacement of 35,000 tons. They could choose a faster ship, able to steam at 30 knots, but that would force them to mount a lighter armament and armor than contemporary foreign battleships. Alternatively, they could choose a lower maximum speed and mount heavier guns, but fitting in adequate protection against newer 16-inch guns would be extremely difficult. The Preliminary Design section drew up five more studies in October, based upon "A" with additional armor or a scaled-down "B"; all used 14-inch guns and called for at least 30 knots. Two called for four turrets, but they would be too heavy and mount less armor. Another, "K," would have a 15-inch (380 mm) belt and 5.25-inch (133 mm) deck, giving it a 19,000–30,000 yd (9.4–14.8 nmi; 17–27 km) immune zone against the United States' super-heavy 14-inch shell. While "K" was liked by the naval constructors, its designed standard displacement of 35,000 tons left little room for error, modifications, or improvements. The final two designs, "L" and "M," would use quadruple turrets to save weight (similar to the French Dunkerque) while still mounting 12 guns.

Many officers in the United States Navy supported the construction of three or four fast battleships for carrier escorts and to counter Japan's Kongō class. These included the acting Secretary of the Navy and Chief of Naval Operations Admiral William Standley, the president of the Naval War College Admiral William S. Pye, a small majority (9–7) of senior officers at sea, and five of six line officers engaged in strategic planning as part of the War Plans Division, although at least one officer believed that an aerial attack would also be capable of sinking the Kongōs. With the above recommendations, the General Board selected "K" to undergo further development.

=== Final ===
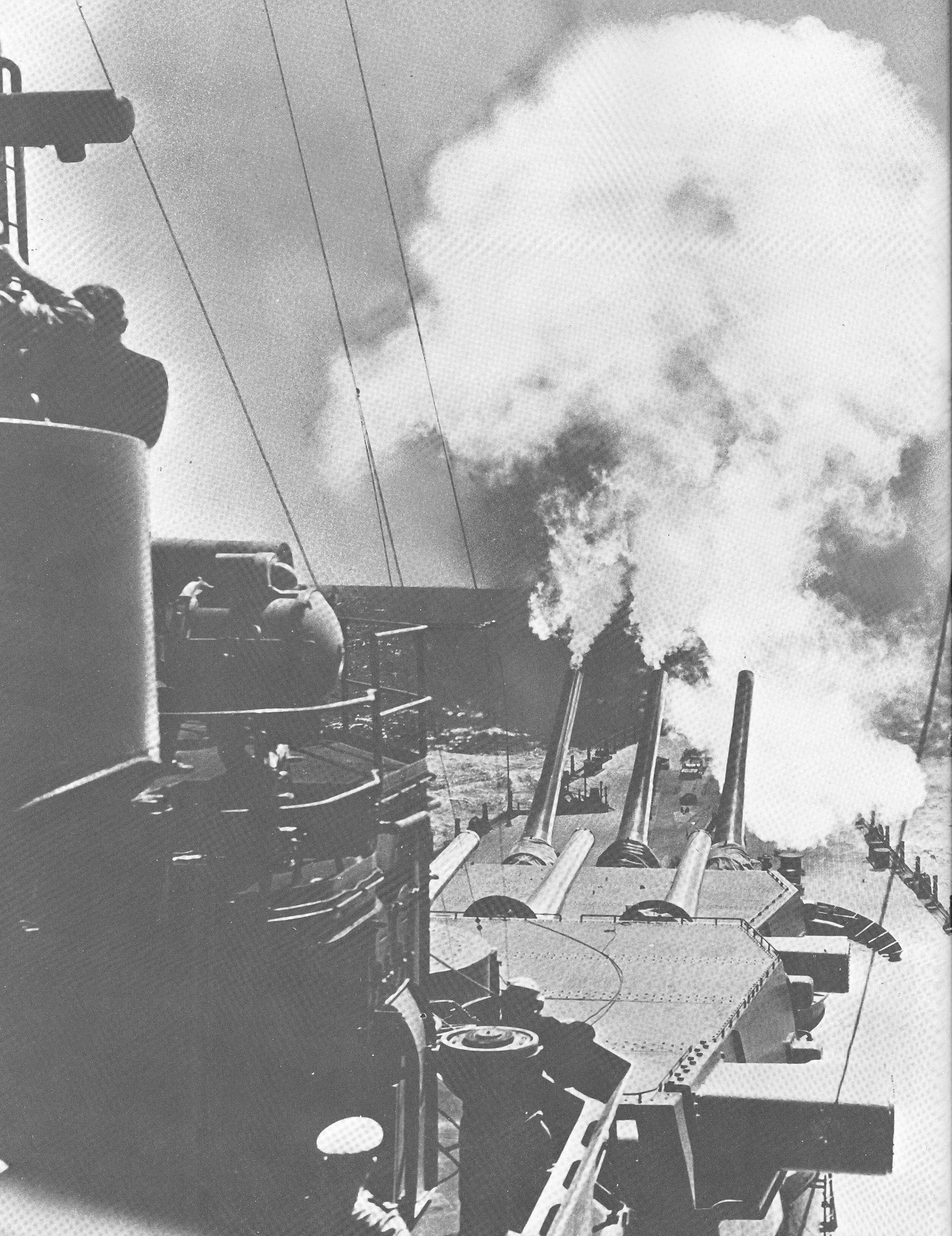
North Carolina fires a three-gun salvo from its number one turret

At least 35 different final designs were proposed. All numbered with Roman numerals ("I" through "XVI-D"), the first five were completed on 15 November 1935. They were the first to employ so-called "paper" weight reductions: not counting certain weights towards the ship's 35,000 long ton treaty limit that were not specifically part of the definition of standard displacement. In this case, even though there was designed storage room for 100 shells per main battery gun and an extra 100 rounds, the weight of the rounds did not figure toward the treaty-mandated limit.

These final designs varied greatly in everything but their standard displacements and speeds. Just one was over the treaty displacement limit; every other design called for 35,000 long tons. Only five planned for a top speed of under 27 kn (50 km/h; 31 mph); of those, only one was lower than 26.5 kn (49.1 km/h): "VII", with 22 kn (41 km/h). "VII" returned to a lower speed to obtain more firepower (twelve 14-inch guns in triple turrets) and protection; as such, the design called for only 50,000 shp (37,000 kW) (Note: The next lowest were "X-A", "XI-A" and "XI-B", with 112,500 shp (83,900 kW).) and a length of only 640 ft (200 m). Most other plans called for 710 ft (220 m) or 725 ft (221 m), although a few had lengths between 660 ft (200 m) and 690 ft (210 m). Several different gun mountings were examined, including eight, nine, ten, eleven, and twelve 14-inch guns; eight 14-inch guns in two quadruple turrets, and even one design with two quadruple 16-inch guns.

One specific design, "XVI," was a 27-knot (50 km/h), 714 ft-long (218 m) ship with twelve 14-inch guns, a 11.2-inch (284.5 mm) belt, and a deck 5.1 to 5.6-inches (129.5 to 142.2 mm) thick. Produced on 20 August 1936, the Bureau of Ordnance found many problems in it. For example, model tests showed that at high speeds, waves generated by the hull would leave certain lower parts of the ship uncovered by water or adequate armor, including around the explosive magazines, and the Bureau believed that hits around this part of the hull were easily possible when fighting at ranges between 20,000 and 30,000 yd (9.9 and 14.8 nmi; 18 and 27 km). Other problems included the design's defense against aircraft-dropped bombs, as the Bureau thought the formula used to calculate its effectiveness was not realistic, and the tapering of a fore bulkhead below the waterline could worsen underwater shell hits because the mostly unarmored bow could easily be penetrated. The proposed solutions for these issues were all impractical: added patches of armor around the magazines could neutralize the effectiveness of the ship's torpedo-defense system, and deepening the belt near the bow and stern would put the ships over the 35,000 long ton limit. The General Board detested this design, saying it was "not ... a true battleship" due to its speed and armor problems.

To address these problems, a final set of designs was presented by the Preliminary Design section in October 1936. Designated "XVI-B" through "XVI-D," they were all modifications of the "XVI" plan. These added an extra 11 feet (3.4 m) of length to "XVI" for greater speed, but the resulting weight increase meant that only eleven 14-inch guns could be mounted with a thin 10.1-inch (260 mm) belt. Another gun could be traded for a 13.5-inch (342.9 mm) belt, and yet another could be swapped for more speed and an extra tenth of an inch of belt armor; this became design "XVI-C". The General Board liked "XVI-C" very much, seeing in it a ship that had enough protection to fight—and survive—in a battle line formed with the US' older battleships while also having enough speed to operate in a detached wing with aircraft carrier or cruiser commerce raiding groups.

However, one member of the Board, Admiral Joseph Reeves—one of the principal developers of the United States' aircraft carrier strategy—disliked "XVI-C" because he believed that it was not fast enough to work with the 33-knot (61 km/h; 38 mph) fast carriers, and it was not powerful enough to justify its cost. Instead, he advocated a development of the previously rejected "XVI", adding additional underwater protection and patches of armor within the ship to make the magazines immune to above- and below-water shell hits from 19,000 yd (9.4 nmi; 17 km) and beyond. The immune zone's outer limit was increased from 28,200 yd (13.9 nmi; 25.8 km) to 30,000 yd (15 nmi; 27 km). After further revisions, Reeves went to Standley, the Chief of Naval Operations, who approved "XVI" in its newly modified form over the hopes of the General Board, who still thought that "XVI-C" should be built. Standley's only addition to the characteristics was to be able to switch from quadruple 14-inch to triple 16 in (406 mm) turrets if the "escalator clause" in the Second London Naval Treaty was invoked.

With these parameters now set, "XVI" would become the basis of the North Carolina class' as-built design despite additional back and forth over the design's final particulars. These included an increase in armor; something allowed by the finding of more on-paper weight savings; the armor's slope was increased from 10° to 13°, and eventually settled at 15°; a months-long debate on the propulsion machinery's layout was finally concluded, and other minor changes.

=== The "escalator clause" ===
The point of this rather long and erratic design history is that, although one might see the North Carolinas [as actually built] in several of these designs, that was not in fact so. The General Board was never entirely sure of what it was willing to give up to achieve some kind of ship within the treaty-limited displacement. [...] The fast capital ship with nine guns, and a speed of 30 knots, yet having good protection, was ultimately rejected in favor of a ship that sacrificed both speed and protection for firepower, a combination unprecedented in American capital ship development.

— Naval historian Norman Friedman

Although the Second London Naval Treaty stipulated that warship guns could be no larger than 14 inches, a so-called "escalator clause" was included at the urging of American negotiators in case any country that had signed the Washington Naval Treaty refused to adhere to this new limit. The provision allowed signatory countries of the Second London Treaty—France, the United Kingdom and the United States—to raise the limit from 14 to 16 inches if Japan or Italy still refused to sign after 1 April 1937. When figuring potential configurations for the North Carolinas, designers focused most of their planning on 14-inch weaponry; Standley's requirement meant that a switch from 14- to 16-inch, even after the ships' keels had been laid, was possible. Japan formally rejected the 14-inch limit on 27 March 1937, meaning that the "escalator clause" could be invoked. There were hurdles that still needed to be overcome, though: Roosevelt was under heavy political pressure and, as a result, was reluctant to allow the 16-inch gun. (Note: The political pressures were not just from within the United States. When rumors that the United States was going to adopt 16-inch guns reached Japan in January 1937, Tokyo newspapers had immediately printed them alongside drawings of American warships aiming their guns at Japan. In addition, if the use of the "escalator clause" touched off another international naval arms race—this one featuring larger and larger ships—the United States would find itself at a huge disadvantage in one of two ways. Either their battleships would be built to have a Panamax capability, rendering them inferior to the new ships of other nations, or they would be designed to be on par with the other nations' ships, meaning that they would have to sail around Cape Horn if they desired to reach the other side of the United States.)

I am not willing that the United States be the first naval power to adopt the 16 in. gun. ... Because of the international importance of the United States not being the first to change the principles laid down in the Washington and London Treaties, it seems to me that the plans for the two new battleships should contemplate the ... 14-inch gun.

Admiral Reeves also came out strongly in favor of the larger weapon. In a two-page letter to Secretary of the Navy Claude A. Swanson and indirectly to Roosevelt, Reeves argued that the 16-inch gun's significantly greater armor penetration was of paramount importance, drawing examples from the First World War's Battle of Jutland, where some battleships were able to survive ten or twenty hits from large guns, but other battlecruisers were blown up in three to seven hits because the shells were able to cut through the armor protecting magazines and turrets. Reeves also argued that the larger gun would favor the "indirect method" of shooting then being developed, where airplanes would be used to relay targeting information to allied battleships so that they could bombard targets that were out of their sight or over the horizon, because new battleships being built by foreign powers would have more armor. Reeves believed that if the 14-inch gun was adopted, it would not be able to penetrate this larger amount of protection, whereas the 16-inch would be able to break through.

In a final vain attempt, Roosevelt's Secretary of State Cordell Hull sent a telegram on 4 June to the Ambassador to Japan Joseph Grew instructing him that the United States would still accept a cap of 14-inch guns if he could get Japan to as well. The Japanese replied that they could not accept this unless the number of battleships was also limited; they wanted the United States and the United Kingdom to agree to having an equal number of battleships with Japan, but this was a condition that the two countries refused to accept. On 24 June, the two North Carolinas were ordered with the 14-inch weapons, but on 10 July, Roosevelt directed that they be armed with triple 16-inch instead. (Note: This change meant that the Bureau of Construction and Repair had to modify the design of the North Carolinas to accommodate the larger and heavier weaponry. As part of this, the ship's longitudinal center of gravity had to be shifted forward; the solution was to move many internal components of the ship forward two frames, or 8 ft (2.4 m). Summations of all of the weights in the ship were not complete until October, and additional planning took until February, so the Secretary of the Navy authorized a one-month extension to the building period of both ships on 15 January 1942, moving the Bureau of Engineering's estimated date of completion to 1 February 1942.)

Selected proposed designs
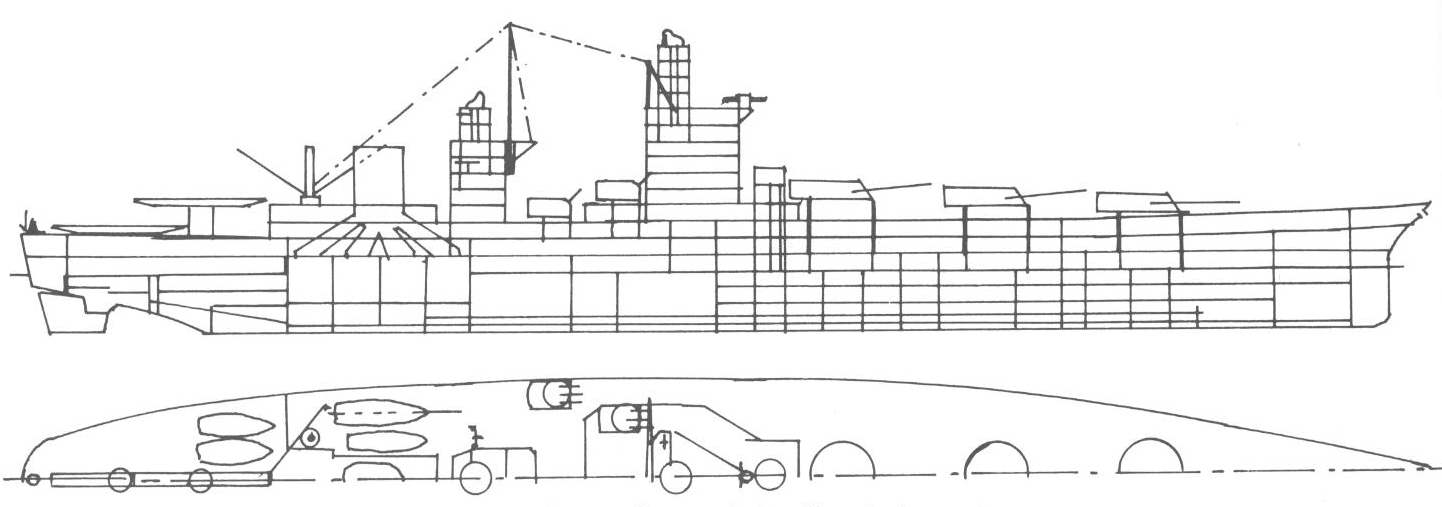
The 32,250-long-ton (32,770 t) design "A" was one of the first proposals. Unlike "B" and "C", it was far below the treaty-mandated limit of 35,000–tons. It would have carried nine 14-inch guns in its main battery; although all of the turrets were forward of the superstructure, the guns could still fire forward provided that they were elevated to 4.5 degrees or more. The secondary battery planned was twelve 5-inch (127 mm) were unusually arranged in triple mounts.

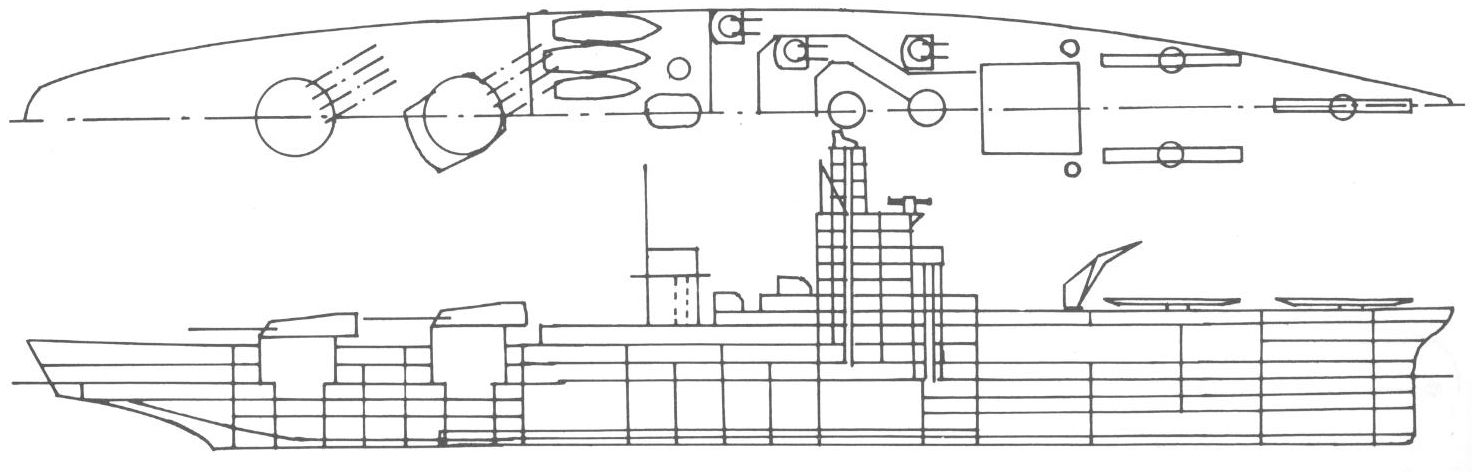
"F" was an attempt to create a viable combination of an aircraft carrier and a battleship. With regards to the treaty limits, the design had an extremely comfortable margin with a standard displacement of 31,750 long tons (32,260 t). Three catapults were mounted on the bow, while a hangar located under that would contain ten bombers with wings folded. Two non-superfiring turrets would be mounted aft, both holding four 14-in guns.

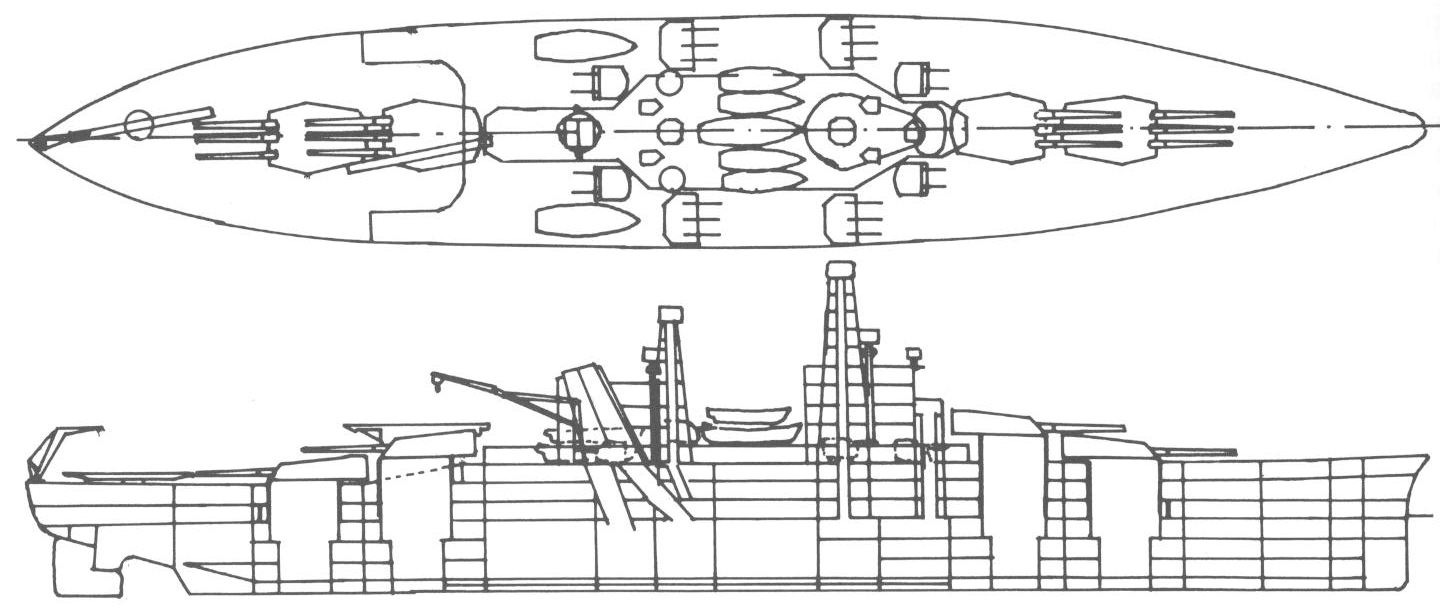
"VII" harked back to the days of the slow battleships; with a top speed of 22 knots (25 mph; 41 km/h), it would have been only 1 knot (1.2 mph; 1.9 km/h) faster than the old ""standard" battleships. The weight gained from reducing the speed was added back in firepower and protection: "VII" would have had twelve 14-inch/50 caliber guns in four triple turrets and an immune zone against its own 14-inch gun between 21,400 and 30,000 yd (11 and 15 nmi; 20 and 27 km).

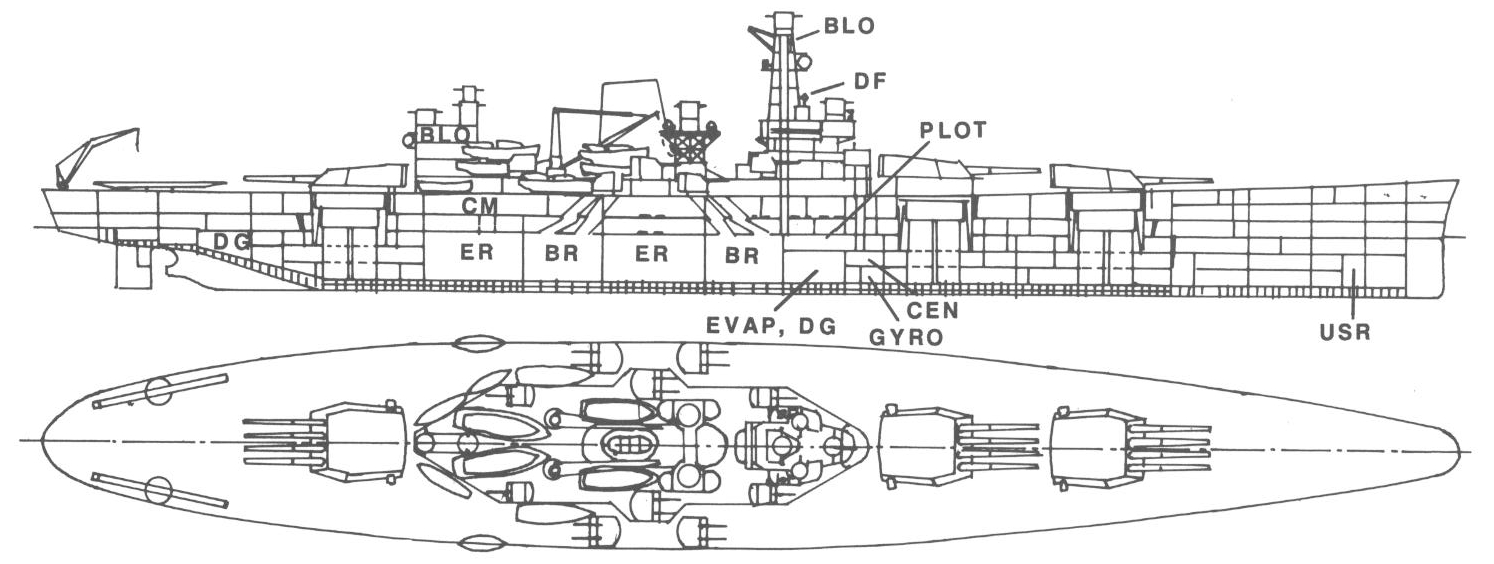
"XVI" was one of the final proposals; after "XVI-C" was rejected, a modified version of this design was chosen for the North Carolinas. There were a few major differences between this and the final plan. For example, all exhaust was eventually trunked into two funnels as opposed to one, and the 5-inch/38 caliber secondary battery was composed of all dual-mounted guns (no single).

== Specifications ==
=== General characteristics ===
The North Carolina was 713 feet 5.25 inches (217.456 m) long at the waterline and 728 feet 8.625 inches (222.113 m) long overall. The maximum beam was 108 feet 3.875 inches (33.017 m) while waterline beam was 104 feet 6 inches (31.85 m) due to the inclination of the armor belt. In 1942, the standard displacement was 36,600 long tons (37,200 t) while full load displacement was 44,800 long tons (45,500 t), while maximum draft was 35 feet 6 inches (10.82 m). At design combat displacement of 42,329 long tons (43,008 t), the mean draft was 31 feet 7.313 inches (9.635 m) and (GM) metacentric height was 8.31 feet (2.53 m). As designed, the crew complement was 1,880 with 108 officers and 1,772 enlisted. By 1945, the considerable increase in anti-aircraft armament and their crew accommodations had increased full load displacement to 46,700 long tons (47,400 t), while crew complement increased to 2,339 with 144 officers and 2,195 enlisted. After the end of World War II, the crew complement was reduced to 1,774. (Note: Washington's dimensions and displacement differ slightly from North Carolina's, with waterline length of 713 feet 8 inches (217.53 m) and overall length of 728 feet 11.625 inches (222.190 m). The 1945 full load was 45,370 long tons (46,100 t) and maximum draft was 34 feet 9 inches (10.59 m).)

The North Carolina class hull feature a bulbous bow and had an unusual stern design for the time by placing the two inboard propulsion shafts in skegs. This was theorized to improve flow conditions to the propellers. Initial model basin testing for various stern configurations suggested that the skeg arrangement could reduce resistance, although later testing during the design process of the Montana-class battleship would indicate an increase in drag. The skegs improved the structural strength of the stern by acting as girders and also provided structural continuity for the torpedo bulkheads. However, the skegs also contributed to severe vibration problems with the class that required extensive testing and modifications to mitigate. The problem was particularly acute near the aft main battery director, which required additional reinforcing braces due to the vibrations. Nevertheless, skegs would be improved and incorporated in the designs of all subsequent American battleships, with vibration problems largely eliminated on the Iowa class battleships.

=== Armament ===
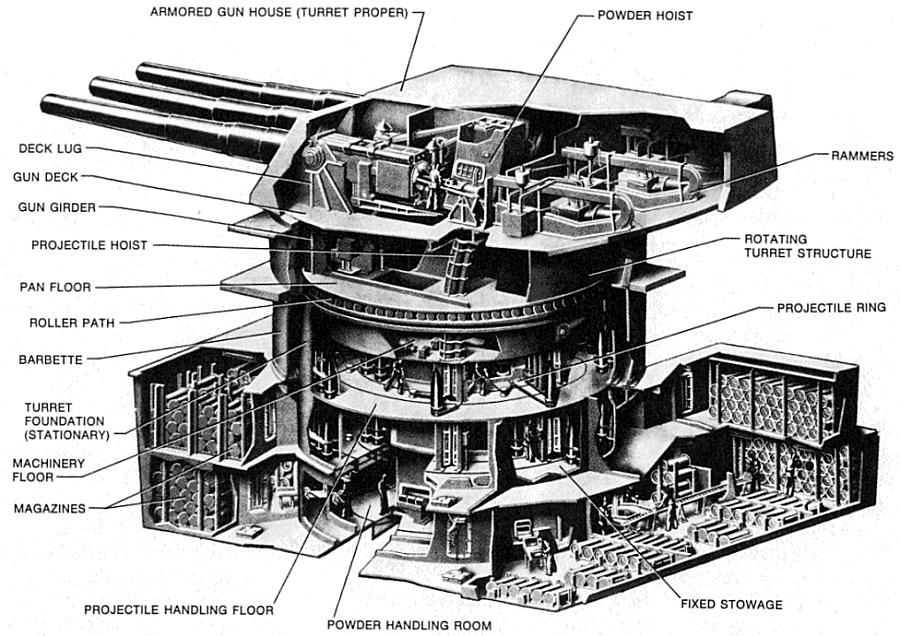
A cut-away diagram of the 16-inch turrets on board the North Carolina class

North Carolina and Washington were principally armed with nine 16-inch (406 mm)/45 caliber (cal) Mark 6 guns and twenty 5-inch (127 mm)/38 cal Mark 12 guns. Their lighter armament consisted of varying numbers of 1.1-inch (28 mm)/75 caliber, .50 caliber machine guns, Bofors 40 mm and Oerlikon 20 mm.

==== Main battery ====
Mounted on both the North Carolina class and the follow-up South Dakota class, the nine 16 in/45 were improved versions of the guns mounted on the Colorado-class battleships, hence the designation of "Mark 6". A major alteration from the older guns was the Mark 6's ability to fire a new 2,700-pound (1,200-kilogram) armor-piercing (AP) shell developed by the Bureau of Ordnance. At full charge with a brand-new gun, the heavy shell would be expelled at a muzzle velocity of 2,300 ft/s (700 m/s). At a reduced charge, the same shell would be fired at 1,800 ft/s (550 m/s). Barrel life—the approximate number of rounds a gun could fire before needing to be relined or replaced—was 395 shells when using AP, although if only practice shells were used this figure was significantly higher: 2,860. Turning at 4 degrees a second, each turret could train to 150 degrees on either side of the ship. The guns could be elevated to a maximum inclination of 45 degrees; turrets one and three could depress to −2 degrees, but due to its superfiring position, the guns on turret two could only depress to 0 degrees.

Each gun was 736 in (18,700 mm) long overall; its bore and rifling length were 715.2-inch (18,170 mm) and 616.9-inch (15,670 mm), respectively. Maximum range with the heavy AP shell was obtained at an inclination of 45 degrees: 36,900 yd (33,700 m). At the same elevation a lighter 1,900-pound (860-kilogram) high capacity (HC) shell would travel 40,180 yards (20 nautical miles; 37 kilometres). The guns weighed 85.85 long tons (192,300 lb; 87,230 kg) not including the breech; the turrets weighed 1,403–1,437 long tons (3,143,000–3,219,000 lb; 1,426,000–1,460,000 kg).

When firing the same shell, the 16-inch/45 Mark 6 had a slight advantage over the 16-inch/50 Mark 7 when hitting deck armor—a shell from a 45 cal gun would be slower, meaning that it would have a steeper trajectory as it descended. At 36,000 yards (18 nautical miles; 33 kilometres), a shell from a 45 cal would strike a ship at an angle of 47.5 degrees, as opposed to 38 degrees with the 50 cal.

==== Secondary battery ====
The North Carolinas carried ten Mark 28 Mod 0 enclosed base ring mounts, each supporting twin 5-inch/38-caliber Mark 12 guns Originally designed to be mounted on destroyers built in the 1930s, these guns were so successful that they were added to a myriad of American ships during the Second World War, including every major ship type and many smaller warships constructed between 1934 and 1945. They were considered to be "highly reliable, robust and accurate" by the Navy's Bureau of Ordnance.

The 5-inch/38 functioned as a dual purpose gun. However, this did not mean that it possessed inferior anti-air abilities; as established during 1941 gunnery tests conducted on board North Carolina, the gun possessed the ability to consistently shoot down aircraft flying at 12,000–13,000 feet (2.3–2.5 miles; 3.7–4.0 kilometres), which was twice as far as the effective range of the earlier single purpose 5-inch/25 anti-air gun.

Each 5-inch/38 weighed almost 4,000 lb (1,800 kg) without the breech. The entire mount weighed 156,295 pounds (70,894 kilograms). It was 223.8 in (5,680 mm) long overall, had a bore length of 190 in (4,800 mm), and had a rifling length of 157.2 in (3,990 mm). The gun could fire shells at about 2,500–2,600 ft/s (760–790 m/s); about 4,600 could be fired before the barrel needed to be replaced. Minimum and maximum elevations were −15 and 85 degrees, respectively. The guns' elevation could be raised or lowered at about 15 degrees per second. Loading was possible at any elevation. The mounts closest to the bow and stern could aim from −150 to 150 degrees; the others were restricted to −80 to 80 degrees. They could be turned at about 25 degrees per second.

==== Smaller weaponry ====
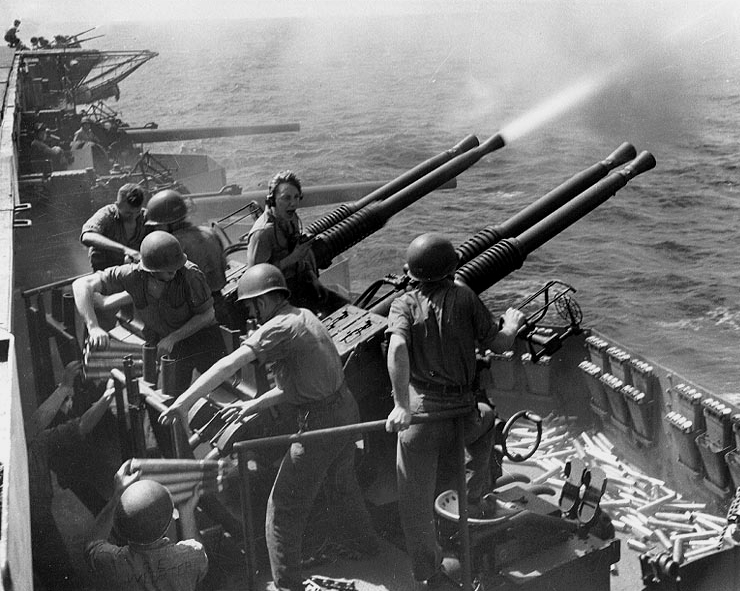
40 mm Bofors guns aboard Hornet in 1945

The remaining weaponry on board the two North Carolinas was composed of differing numbers of 1.1"/75 caliber guns, .50 caliber machine guns, Bofors 40 mm and Oerlikon 20 mm cannons. Although the ships were originally designed to carry only four quadruple 1.1 in and twelve .50 caliber, this was greatly increased and upgraded during the war.

On both ships, two more quadruple sets of 1.1 in guns were added in place of two searchlights amidships. After it was torpedoed in 1942, North Carolina had these removed and ten quadruple sets of 40 mm guns added. Fourteen were present by June 1943, while a fifteenth mount was added on top of the third main turret that November. Washington retained its six 1.1 in quads until the middle of 1943, when ten quad 40 mm guns replaced them. By August, it had fifteen. The two ships carried these through to the close of the war.

The .50 caliber machine guns did not have the range or power needed to combat modern aircraft and were scheduled for replacement by equal numbers of 20 mm guns, but nothing immediately came of the proposal. In fact, both North Carolina and Washington carried 20 mm and .50 caliber guns for most of 1942. In April, North Carolina had, respectively, forty and twelve, while Washington had twenty and twelve. Two months later, the number of 20 mm guns remained the same, but twelve .50 caliber guns had been added. By September, Washington had twenty more 20 mm guns added, for a total of forty, but five were removed—along with all of the .50 caliber guns—shortly thereafter when two quadruple sets of 1.1 in guns were added. In its refit after being torpedoed, North Carolina had an additional six 20 mm guns added and all of its .50 caliber weapons removed. Washington had sixty-four 20 mm weapons by April 1943, prior to one single mount being replaced by a quadruple mount, and North Carolina had fifty-three by March 1944. In April 1945, North Carolina was assigned to have fifty-six 20 mm, while Washington was assigned seventy-five. In August 1945, the ships both had eight twin 20 mm mounts; North Carolina also carried twenty single, while Washington carried one quad and sixty-three single.

=== Electronics ===
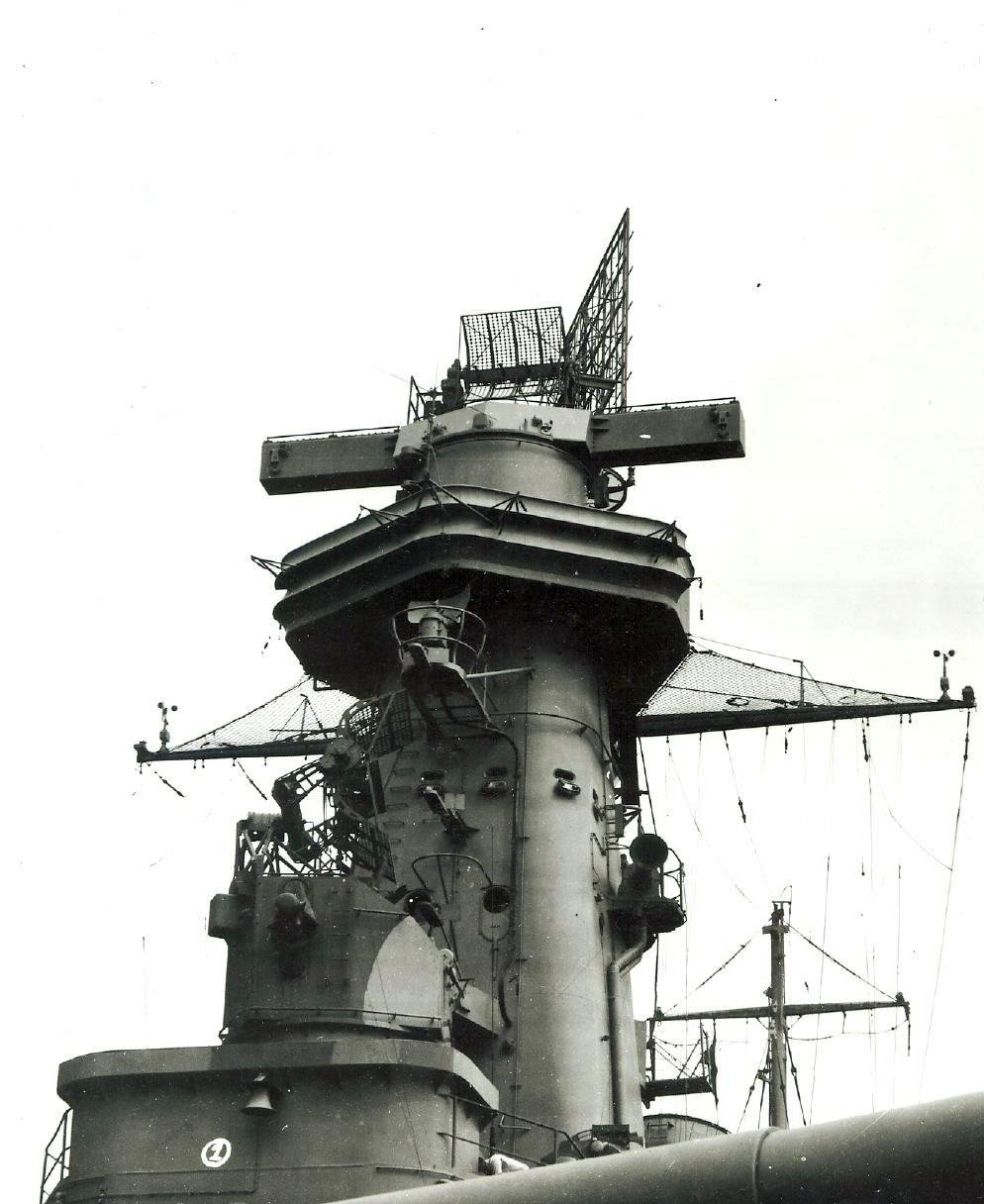
Washington's tower foremast, seen on 18 August 1942 at the New York Navy Yard; note the SG surface search radar located on the forward face

Both North Carolina and Washington, designed prior to radar, were originally fitted with many fire-control and navigational optical range-finders. The former lasted until 1944, when it was replaced by a Mark 27 microwave radar supplemented by a Mark 3 main armament fire control radar. The range-finders were removed in favor of additional 20 mm guns sometime between the end of 1941 and mid-1942. In addition, the ships were commissioned with two Mark 38 directors and were originally fitted with a CXAM air search, two Mark 3s and three Mark 4 secondary armament.

By November 1942, North Carolina had an additional Mark 4 and a SG surface search radar added. The normal battleship configuration was present aboard North Carolina in April 1944, with SK and SG radars (air and surface search, respectively), a backup SG, and Mark 8s to direct its main battery. All of the Mark 4s remained for the secondary battery, and one of the older Mark 3s was still present, possibly as a backup for the Mark 8s. An SK-2 dish replaced the older SK radar and Mark 12s and 22s superseded the Mark 4s in September of that year. Aside from never receiving an SK-2, Washington was the recipient of similar upgrades.

Both ships underwent extensive refits near the end or after the war. North Carolina received a secondary air search set (SR) and a SCR-720 zenith search radar on the forward funnel. At the end of the war, it had an SP surface-search, a SK-2 air-search, a Mark 38 main battery fire control system with Mark 13 and 27 radars, a Mark 37 secondary battery fire control system with Mark 12, 22 and 32 radars, and a Mark 57 smaller weaponry fire control system, with a Mark 34 radar. In March 1946, Washington had a SK fore and a SR aft, a SG both fore and aft, and a TDY jammer (which could scramble radar on other ships).

=== Propulsion ===
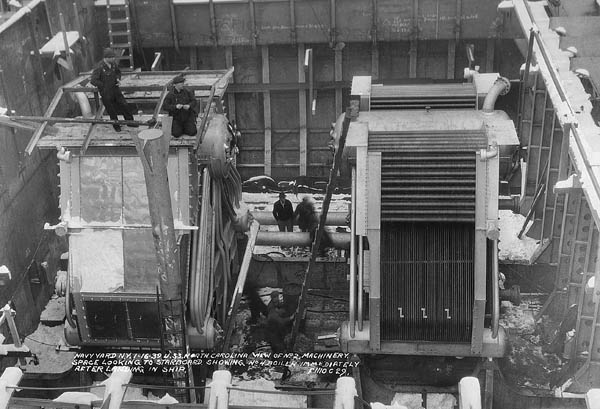
North Carolina's No. 2 machinery space under construction, seen from the port side of the ship on 16 January 1939; the No. 4 boiler has just been installed

The ships in the North Carolina class were equipped with four General Electric geared turbines and eight Babcock & Wilcox three-drum express type boilers. The ships' powerplant incorporated several recent developments in turbine equipment, including double helical reduction gears and high-pressure steam technology. North Carolina's boilers supplied steam at 575 psi (3,960 kPa) and as hot as 850 °F (454 °C). (Note: For comparative purposes, the boilers fitted to the most recently designed heavy cruisers provided steam at 300 psi (2,100 kPa) and 572 °F (300 °C).) To meet the design requirement of 27 kn (50 km/h; 31 mph), the engine system was originally designed to supply 115,000 shp (85,755 kW), but the new technologies increased this output to 121,000 shp (90,000 kW). Despite this increase, the maximum speed for the ships did not change, since the modifications to the powerplant were incorporated later in the design process. The turbines that had already been installed could not fully take advantage of the higher pressure and temperature steam, and so the level of efficiency was not as high as it should have been. When going astern, the engines provided 32,000 shp (24,000 kW).

The engine system was divided into four engine rooms, all on the centerline. Each room contained a turbine and two boilers, without any division between the boilers and turbines. This was done to limit the risk of capsizing should the ship sustain heavy flooding in the engine rooms. The engine rooms alternated in their layout: the first and third engine rooms were arranged with the turbine on the starboard side and its corresponding boilers on the port, this was reversed in the second and fourth rooms. The forward-most engine room powered the starboard outer shaft, the second turbine drove the outer screw on the port side, the third engine supplied power to the inner starboard propeller, and the fourth turbine drove the port-side inner screw. All four screws had four blades; the two outer propellers were 15 ft 4 in (4.67 m) in diameter and the inner pair were 16 ft 7.5 in (5.067 m) wide. Steering was controlled by a pair of rudders.

At the time of their commissioning, the ships had a top speed of 28 knots (52 km/h; 32 mph), though by 1945, with the addition of other equipment, such as anti-aircraft weaponry, their maximum speed was reduced to 26.8 knots (49.6 km/h; 30.8 mph). The increases in weight also reduced the ships' cruising range. In 1941, the ships could steam for 17,450 nautical miles (32,320 km; 20,080 mi) at a cruising speed of 15 knots (28 km/h; 17 mph); by 1945, the range at that speed was reduced to 16,320 nmi (30,220 km; 18,780 mi). At 25 knots (46 km/h; 29 mph), the range was considerably lower, at 5,740 nmi (10,630 km; 6,610 mi).

Electrical power was supplied by eight generators. Four were turbo-generators designed for naval use; these provided 1,250 kilowatts each. The other four were diesel generators that supplied 850 kilowatts each. Two smaller diesel generators—each provided 200 kilowatts—supplied emergency power should the main system be damaged. Total electrical output was 8,400 kilowatts, not including the emergency generators, at 450 volts on an alternating current.

=== Armor ===
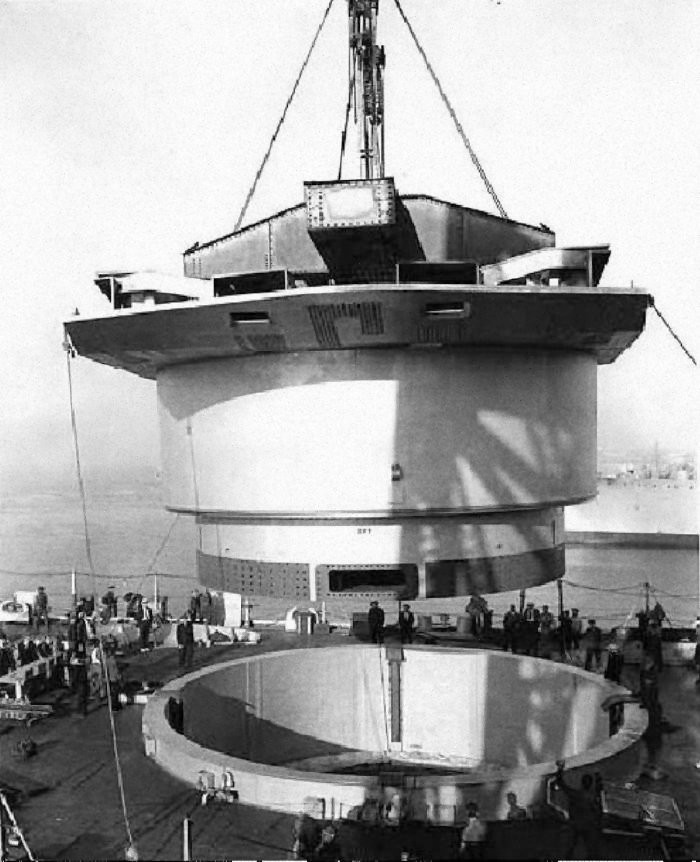
One of Washington's main gun turrets is installed upon the ship; note how thick the barbette is, ranging from 11.5 to 16 inches (292–406 mm)

The North Carolina class incorporated "all or nothing" armor which weighed 41% of the total displacement; it consisted of an "armored raft" that extended from just forward of the first gun turret to just aft of the rear gun turret. They had a main armored belt of Class A armor that was 12-inch (305 mm) thick amidships, inclined at 15°, and backed by 0.75-inch (19 mm) Special Treatment Steel (STS). This tapered down to 6-inch (152 mm) on the lower edge of the belt. The ships had three armored decks; their main deck was 1.45-inch (37 mm) thick. The second, thickest deck was 3.6-inch (91 mm) of Class B armor laminated on 1.4-inch (36 mm) STS for a total of 5-inch (127 mm). In the outboard sections of the hull the plating was 4.1-inch (104 mm) Class B laminated on 1.4-inch (36 mm) STS. The third and thinnest deck was 0.62-inch (16 mm) thick inboard, and .75-inch (19 mm) outboard. The first deck was designed to cause delay-fuzed projectiles to detonate, while the thicker second deck would protect the ships' internals. The third deck was intended to protect against shell splinters that might have penetrated the second deck; it also acted as the upper support for the torpedo bulkheads. The conning tower was connected to the armored citadel by a 14-inch (356 mm) thick communications tube. Armor thickness for the conning tower itself ranged from 16 inches (406 mm) on both sides to 14.7 inches (373 mm) on the front and rear. The roof was 7 inches (178 mm) thick and the bottom was 3.9 inches (99 mm) thick.

The main battery turrets were heavily armored: the turret faces were 16-inch (406 mm) thick, the sides were 9-inch (229 mm) thick, the rear sides were 11.8-inch (300 mm) thick, and the roofs were 7-inch (178 mm) thick. Sixteen–inch-thick armor was the maximum width factories were able to produce at the time of the ships' design; by 1939, however, it was possible to create 18-inch (457 mm)-thick plates. These were not installed because it was estimated that the conversion would delay completion of the ships by 6 to 8 months. The barbettes that held the turrets were also strongly protected. The front portion was 14.7 inches (373 mm), the sides increased to 16 in, and the rear portion reduced to 11.5-inch (292 mm). The 5-inch gun turrets, along with their ammunition magazines, were armored with 1.95-inch (50 mm) STS plates.

The side protection system incorporated five compartments divided by torpedo bulkheads and a large anti-torpedo bulge that ran the length of the "armored raft". The outer two compartments, the innermost compartment and the bulge would remain empty, while the third and fourth compartments would be filled with liquid. The system was reduced in depth at either end by the forward and rear gun turrets. In these areas, the fifth compartment was deleted; instead, there was an outer empty compartment and two liquid-filled spaces, backed by another empty compartment. To compensate for the reduced underwater protection system, these sections received additional armor plating, up to 3.75-inch (95 mm) in thickness. The complete system was 18.5 ft (5.64 m) deep and designed to withstand warheads of up to 700 lb (320 kg) of TNT. Underwater protection was rounded out by a triple bottom that was 5.75 ft (2 m) deep. The bottom layer was 3 ft (1 m) thick and was kept filled with fluid, while the upper 2.75-foot (1 m) thick layer was kept empty. The triple bottom was also heavily subdivided to prevent catastrophic flooding should the upper layer be penetrated.

== Service ==
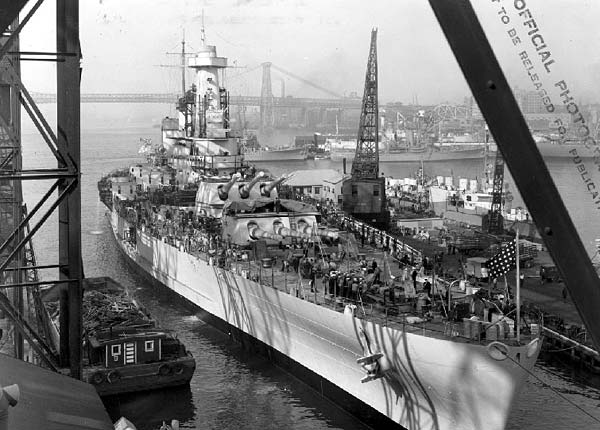
North Carolina fitting out

=== Construction ===
Two ships, each to cost about $50 million, were authorized in January 1937. Five shipyards submitted bids to build one of the two planned ships. Three were privately run corporations: Bethlehem Shipbuilding, New York Shipbuilding and Newport News Shipbuilding. The other two, the New York Naval Shipyard and Philadelphia Naval Shipyard, were run by the government. When bids were reviewed, the privately run shipyards' submissions ranged from $46 to 50 million, while their government counterparts came in at $37 million. Newport News was unique among these in refusing any fixed monetary value in favor of a "cost-plus 3 1/2%" price, but this led to the rejection of their bid out of hand.

The bids from private companies were heavily influenced by the legislation of the New Deal. The Vinson–Trammell Act limited profit from a ship's construction to 10 percent, while the Walsh–Healey Public Contracts Act specified a minimum wage and required working conditions for workers. The latter act greatly affected the ability of the navy to acquire steel, as the text of the law caused friction between executives in the industry, who greatly disliked the forty-hour work week and minimum wage requirements, and their workers—who themselves were embroiled in a separate dispute pitting the union of the skilled workers, the American Federation of Labor, against the union of the unskilled, the Congress of Industrial Organizations. Amid the unrest, the navy ran into difficulties trying to acquire 18 million pounds of steel to build six destroyers and three submarines; many more pounds than this would be needed for the new battleships.

The private shipyards, however, had their own labor problems, so much so that one author described the navy's issues as "minimal" compared to their shipbuilding counterparts. This increased the price of the battleships to $60 million each, so the Bureau of Steam Engineering and Bureau of Construction and Repair recommended to their superiors that the $37 million tenders from the two navy yards be accepted. This was confirmed by Roosevelt, as the private shipyards' bids were seen as unjustly inflated. The contracts for North Carolina and Washington—names had been officially chosen on 3 May 1937—were sent to the New York and Philadelphia yards, respectively, on 24 June 1937. Shortly after this announcement, Roosevelt was bombarded with heavy lobbying from citizens and politicians from Camden and the state of New Jersey, in an ultimately futile attempt to have the construction of North Carolina shifted to Camden's New York Shipbuilding; such a contract would keep many men employed in that area. Roosevelt refused, saying that the disparity in price was too great. Instead, the company was awarded two destroyer tenders in December 1937, Dixie and Prairie.

Construction of the North Carolina class was slowed by the aforementioned material issues, the changes made to the basic design after this date—namely the substitution of 16-inch for 14-inch guns—and the need to add both length and strength to the slipways already present in the navy yards. Increased use of welding was proposed as a possible way to reduce weight and bolster the structural design, as it could have reduced the ships' structural weight by 10%, but it was used in only about 30% of the ship. The costs associated with welding and an increase in the time of construction made it impractical.

=== North Carolina ===
USS North Carolina (BB-55) was laid down on 27 October 1937, the first battleship begun by the United States since the never-completed South Dakota class of the early 1920s. Although North Carolina was launched on 13 June 1940 and commissioned on 9 April 1941, it did not go on active duty because of acute longitudinal vibrations from its propeller shafts. A problem shared with its sister Washington and some other ships like Atlanta, it was only cured after different propellers were tested aboard North Carolina, including four-bladed and cut-down versions of the original three-bladed. This testing required it to be at sea, and the many resulting trips out of New York Harbor to the Atlantic Ocean caused it to be nicknamed "The Showboat".

After a shakedown cruise in the Caribbean Sea and participation in war exercises, North Carolina transited the Panama Canal en route to the Pacific War. Joining Task Force (TF) 16, the battleship escorted the aircraft carrier Enterprise during the invasions of Guadalcanal and Tulagi on 7 August 1942, and continued to accompany the carrier when it moved to be southeast of the Solomons. The Battle of the Eastern Solomons began when Japanese carriers were spotted on 24 August; although American planes were able to strike first by sinking the light carrier Ryūjō, a strike group from a different force, formed around the fleet carriers Shōkaku and Zuikaku, attacked TF 16. In an intense eight-minute battle, North Carolina shot down 7–14 aircraft and was relatively undamaged, though there were seven near-misses and one crewman was killed by strafing. Enterprise took three bomb hits.

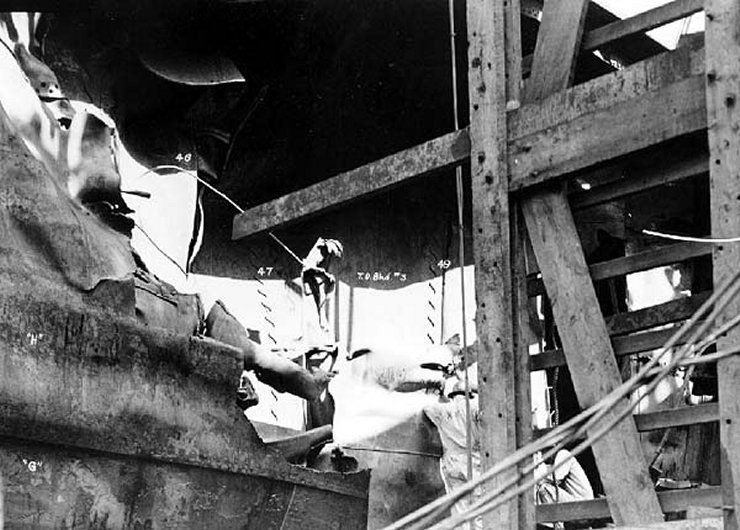
I-19's torpedo opened a gaping hole in North Carolina's hull

North Carolina then joined the carrier Saratoga's screen, and protected it while support was rendered to American troops fighting on Guadalcanal. Although it dodged one torpedo on 6 September, it was not able to avoid another on the 15th. Out of a six-torpedo salvo from the Japanese submarine I-19, three hit the carrier Wasp, one hit O'Brien, one missed, and one struck North Carolina. A 660 lb (300 kg) warhead hit on the port side 20 ft (6.1 m) below the waterline at a point that was just behind the number one turret. It created a 32 ft × 18 ft (9.8 m × 5.5 m) hole, allowed about 970 long tons (986 t) of water into the ship—which had to be offset with counter-flooding, meaning that another 480 long tons (488 t) entered—killed five men, and wounded twenty. Although North Carolina could steam at 24 knots (44 km/h; 28 mph) soon after the explosion, it was later forced to slow to 18 knots (33 km/h; 21 mph) to ensure that temporary shoring did not fail. Structural damage beneath the first turret rendered it unable to fire unless in absolute need, and the main search radar failed. As this was the first torpedo to strike a modern American battleship, there was a large amount of interest from various officers and bureaus within the navy in learning more about it. The conclusions were seen as a vindication by some who believed that too much had been sacrificed in the design of the North Carolinas—the torpedo defense system had come close to breaking near one of the most important areas of the ship (a magazine), after all—and the General Board called for the fifth and sixth Iowa-class battleships, Illinois and Kentucky, to have a torpedo bulge added outside their magazines. However, the new Bureau of Ships opposed this on the basis that the system performed as it was supposed to; in any case, no modifications were made.

Repaired and refitted at the facilities in Pearl Harbor, North Carolina operated as a carrier escort for Enterprise and Saratoga for the remainder of 1942 and the majority of 1943 while they provided cover for supply and troop movements in the Solomons. In between, it received advanced fire control and radar gear in March, April and September 1943 at Pearl Harbor. In November, North Carolina escorted Enterprise while the carrier launched strikes upon Makin, Tarawa and Abemama. On 1–8 December it bombarded Nauru before returning to carrier screening; it accompanied Bunker Hill while that carrier launched attacks on Kavieng and New Ireland.

Joining Task Force 58 in January 1944, North Carolina escorted aircraft carriers as the flagship of Vice Admiral Willis A. Lee, Commander, Battleships, Pacific Fleet (ComBatPac) for much of the year, providing support for airborne strikes on Kwajalein, Namur, Truk (twice), Saipan, Tinian, Guam, Palau, Woleai, and Hollandia in January–April. Also in April, North Carolina destroyed defensive installations on Ponape before setting course for Pearl Harbor for repairs to a damaged rudder. With repairs completed, the battleship joined with Enterprise on 6 June for assaults within the Marianas; as part of these, North Carolina used its main battery to bombard Saipan and Tanapag.

In late June, North Carolina was one of the American ships which took part in the so-called "Marianas Turkey Shoot", where a majority of attacking Japanese aircraft were shot down out of the air at little cost to the American defenders. Problems with its propeller shafts then caused the battleship to sail to the Puget Sound Navy Yard to receive an overhaul. It returned to active duty in November and to its carrier escort tasks in time to be hit by a typhoon. North Carolina protected carriers while they provided air cover for invasion fleets and launched attacks on Leyte, Luzon, and the Visayas. Surviving another typhoon, one which sank three destroyers, North Carolina continued escort duty when naval aircraft struck Formosa, Indo-China, China, the Ryukyus and Honshu in January and February 1945. During the invasion of Iwo Jima, the battleship provided bombardment support for troops ashore.

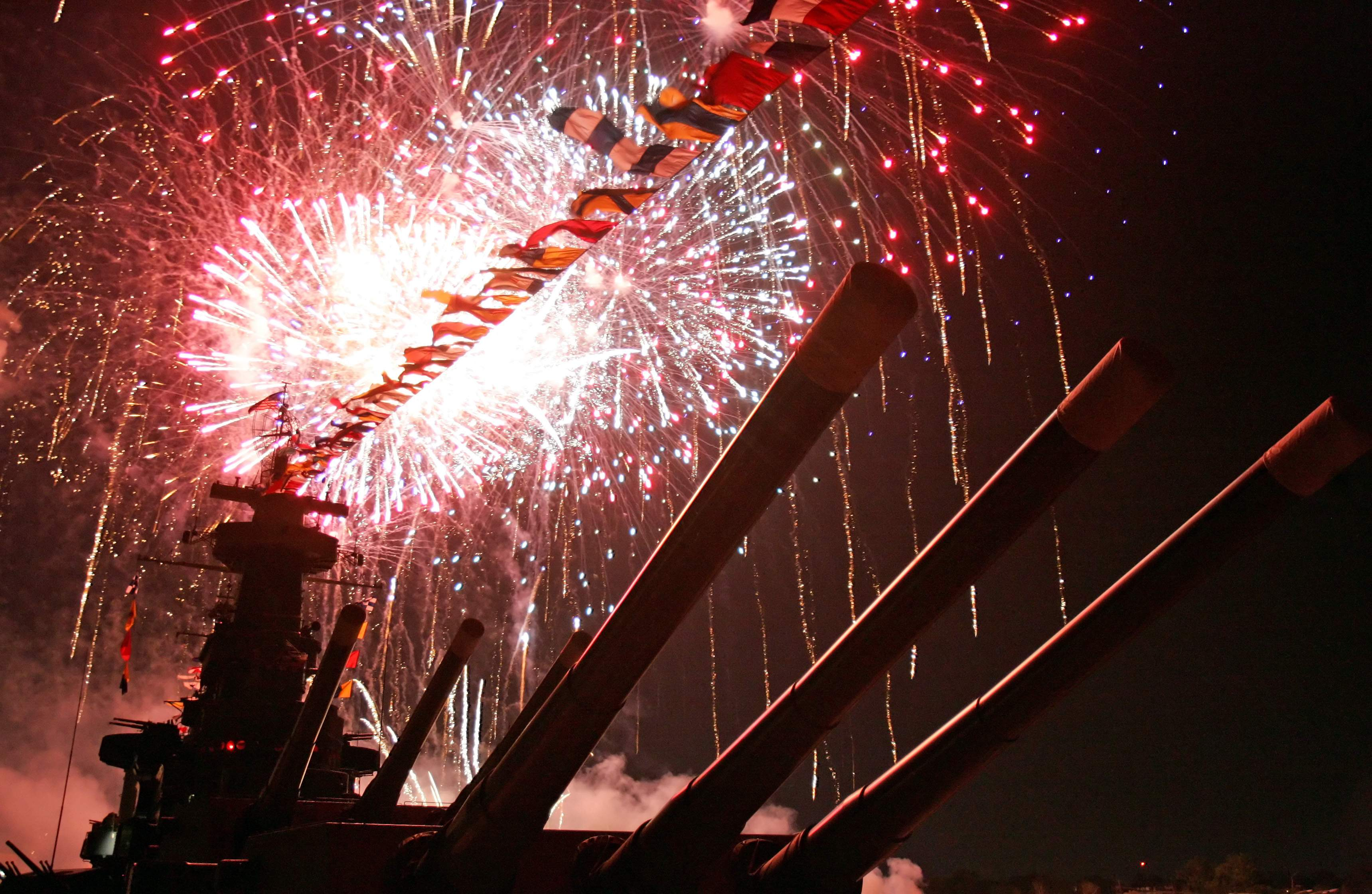
Fireworks exploding over North Carolina in 2008, during ceremonies commemorating the commissioning of the submarine North Carolina (SSN-777)

During the assault on Okinawa, North Carolina screened carriers and bombarded targets ashore. Although it was able to shoot down three kamikazes on 6 April, it was also struck by a 5-inch (127 mm) shell during that time in a friendly fire incident; three were killed and forty-four injured. The battleship shot down a plane on the 7th and two on the 17th. After receiving another overhaul from 9 May to 28 June, this one in the naval yard at Pearl Harbor, North Carolina operated as both a carrier escort and shore bombardier for the remainder of the war. Of note was a 17 July bombardment of the industrial area in Hitachi, Ibaraki in company with fellow battleships Alabama, Missouri, Wisconsin and HMS King George V, along with smaller warships.

In August, members of North Carolina's crew and Marine contingent were sent ashore to assist in occupying Japan. After the official surrender, these men were brought back aboard and the battleship sailed to Okinawa. As part of Operation "Magic Carpet", soldiers were embarked to be returned to the United States. Passing through the locks of Panama Canal on 8 October, it weighed anchor in Boston on the 17th. After an overhaul in the New York Naval Yard, it participated in exercises off New England before beginning a midshipman training cruise in the Caribbean.

North Carolina was decommissioned in Bayonne, New Jersey on 27 June 1947; it remained in the reserve fleet in until 1 June 1960, when it was struck from the Naval Vessel Register. Instead of the scrapping that faced most of the United States' battleships, North Carolina was sold to the state of North Carolina for $250,000 on 8 August 1961 to be a museum ship. It was dedicated in Wilmington on 29 April 1962 as a memorial to the citizens of the state who died in the Second World War. Listed on the United States' National Register of Historic Places and designated as a National Historic Landmark on 1 January 1986, it remains there today, maintained by the USS North Carolina Battleship Commission.

=== Washington ===
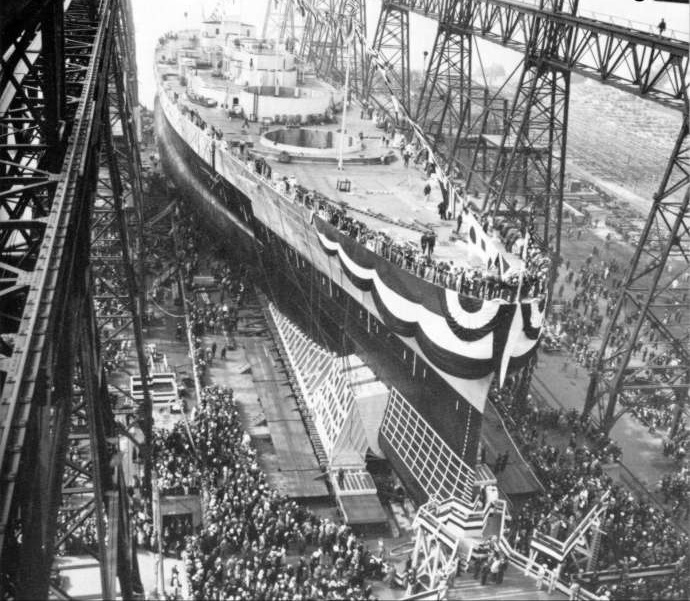
The launch of Washington on 1 June 1940

USS Washington (BB-56) was laid down on 14 June 1938, launched on 1 June 1940 and commissioned on 15 May 1941 at the Philadelphia Naval Shipyard. Although commissioned, its engine had not yet been run at full power—like its sister, Washington had major problems with longitudinal vibrations, which were only tempered after many tests conducted aboard North Carolina. The fixes made it possible to run builder's trials, which Washington did on 3 August 1941; loaded at about 44,400 long tons (45,100 t), the propulsion plant was run up to 123,850 shp (92,350 kW), and repeated the performance again in February 1942, achieving 127,100 and 120,000 shp (94,800 and 89,500 kW).

In early 1942 Rear Admiral John W. Wilcox chose Washington as the flagship of Task Force 39. On 26 March 1942, Washington, along with Wasp, Wichita, Tuscaloosa and various smaller ships, sailed to bolster the British Home Fleet. During the voyage, Wilcox fell into the ocean; he was seen soon after by the destroyer Wilson, face down in the water, but due to rough seas they were unable to retrieve the body. It is not known what exactly happened; he could have simply been caught by a wave and washed overboard, but there has been speculation that he suffered a heart attack. The force reached the main anchorage of the Home Fleet, Scapa Flow, on 4 April.

Washington and the other ships of TF 39 participated in exercises with the Home Fleet until late April. Along with certain British units, the task force departed the British Isles as TF 99. They escorted some of the Arctic convoys which were carrying vital cargo to the Soviet Union. While carrying out this duty, an accompanying British battleship, HMS King George V, accidentally rammed a destroyer, cutting it in two. Directly behind King George V, Washington passed through the same stretch of sea and received damage from exploding depth charges. Though damage to the hull was minimal—limited to only one leaking fuel tank—many devices on board the ship were damaged, including main battery range finders, circuit breakers, three fire-control and the search radars. The American ships then put in at an Icelandic port, Hvalfjörður, until 15 May; they returned to Scapa Flow on 3 June. On 4 June, Washington hosted the commander of US naval forces in Europe, Admiral Harold Rainsford Stark, who set up a temporary headquarters on the ship for the next few days. On 7 June, King George VI of the United Kingdom inspected the battleship.

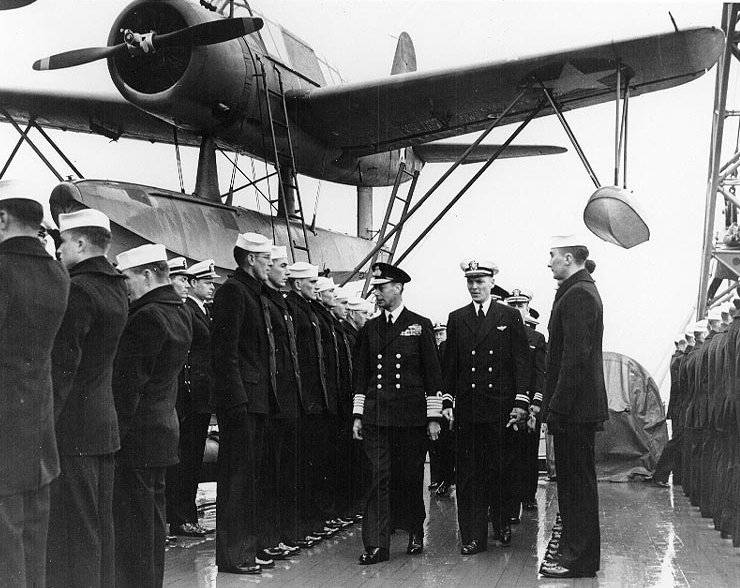
King George VI of the United Kingdom (left column, walking towards camera) on board Washington, 7 June 1942; an OS2U Kingfisher is in the background

Washington left the North Sea bound for the United States on 14 July with an escort of four destroyers; upon arrival at the New York Naval Yard on the 23rd, it was given a full overhaul which took a month to be completed. It set sail for the Panama Canal and the Pacific Ocean on 23 August and reached its destination, Tonga Island, on 14 September, where it became the flagship of Admiral Willis "Ching" Lee. Over the coming months, Washington would be focused upon the safe arrival of supply convoys to the men fighting on Guadalcanal. On 13 November, three formations of Japanese ships were discovered on course for Guadalcanal, one of them aiming to bombard Henderson Field while night gave them protection from aircraft. The first Japanese bombardment force was driven back by an American cruiser-destroyer force. On 14 November, the Japanese organized another sortie to neutralize the airfield. Washington, South Dakota, and four destroyers were sent to intercept the Japanese force that night. The Japanese, composed of the fast battleship Kirishima, two heavy cruisers, two light cruisers, and nine destroyers, initially sank three US destroyers and inflicted significant topside damage to South Dakota. However, Washington remained undetected and at midnight fired on Kirishima from 5,800 yd (5 km; 3 nmi), point blank range for Washington's 16-inch/45-caliber guns. Washington fired seventy-five 16-inch and one hundred and seven 5-inch rounds during the melee, scoring 20 main and seventeen secondary battery hits, knocking out Kirishima's steering and main battery and causing uncontrollable progressive flooding. Kirishima capsized at 03:25 on the morning of 15 November 1942, with 212 crewmen lost. Radar-directed fire from Washington's secondary battery also damaged destroyer Ayanami so severely it had to be scuttled. Soon after the battle, the Japanese began evacuating Guadalcanal.

Until April 1943, Washington stayed near its base in New Caledonia, providing protection for convoys and battle groups that were supporting the Solomons campaign. Returning to Pearl Harbor, it practiced for battle and underwent an overhaul before returning to the combat zone in late July. From August to the end of October, Washington operated out of Efate. It then joined with four battleships and six destroyers as Task Group (TG) 53.2 for exercises; Enterprise, Essex and Independence also participated. TG 52.2 then voyaged to the Gilbert Islands to add additional firepower to the strikes currently hitting them. Departing in late November, Washington first steamed to Makin to provide protection for ships there, then Ocean Island to prepare to bombard Nauru with its sister North Carolina, all four South Dakota-class battleships, and the carriers Bunker Hill and Monterey. All of the capital ships struck before dawn on 8 December; the aircraft carriers struck again soon after. The ships then sailed back to Efate, arriving on 12 December. On Christmas, Washington, North Carolina, and four destroyers left Efate for gunnery practice. By late January, it was made part of TG 50.1 to escort the fast carriers in that group as they launched strikes on Taroa and Kwajalein. It also moved in to hit Kwajalein with its guns on 30 January.

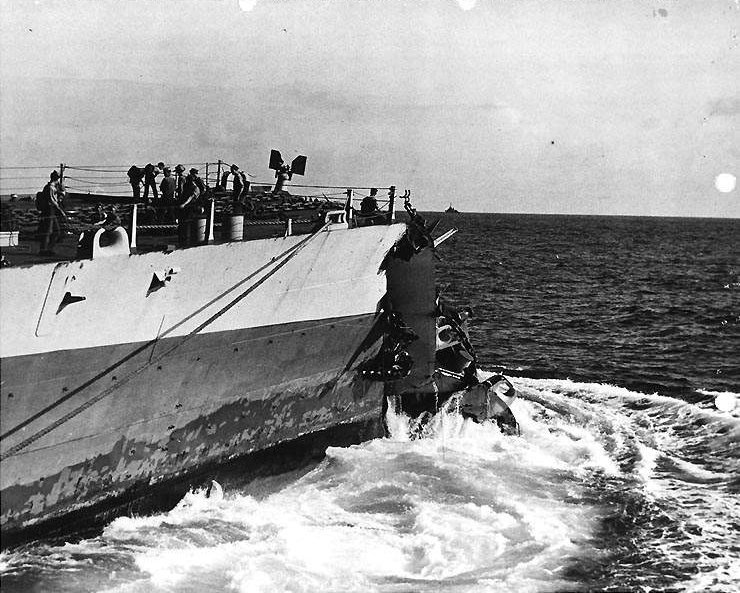
The severe damage done to Washington's bow after its collision with Indiana

Before dawn on 1 February, with the sky still shrouded in darkness, Washington collided with Indiana when the latter left formation to fuel four destroyers. Indiana had radioed that it was going to make a turn to port out of the formation, but soon after starting the turn, its captain ordered a reversal, back to starboard. About seven minutes later, it came into view of lookouts aboard Washington at a range of 1,000 yards (3,000 ft; 914 m). Although crews on both ships frantically tried to avoid the other, it was to no avail; Washington gave Indiana a glancing blow, scraping down a large aft portion of the ship's starboard side. Washington's fore end was severely damaged, with about 60 ft (18 m) of its bow hanging down and into the water. Ten men, six from Washington, were killed or listed as missing. After temporary reinforcements to the damaged section, it was forced to sail to Pearl Harbor to be fitted with a false bow to make possible a voyage to Puget Sound. Once there, it received a full overhaul, along with a new bow; this work lasted from March until April. Washington did not enter the war zone again until late May.

Washington next participated in the Mariana and Palau Islands campaign, serving again as a carrier escort ship, though it was detached on the 13th to fire on Japanese positions on Saipan and Tinian. With the sortie of a majority of the remaining ships in the Imperial Japanese Navy spotted by American submarines, Washington, along with six other battleships, four heavy cruisers and fourteen destroyers covered the aircraft carriers of TF 58; on the 19th, with the attack of many aircraft, the Battle of the Philippine Sea began. Able to beat off the attacks, Washington refueled and continued escorting carriers until it formed a new task group with three battleships and escorts. After a lengthy stop at Enewetak Atoll, it supported troops assaulting Peleliu and Angaur before returning to screening duties. This duty lasted from 10 October to 17 February 1945.

The battleship bombarded Iwo Jima from 19–22 February in support of the invasion there before escorting carriers which sent aircraft raids against Tokyo and targets on the island of Kyūshū. On 24 March and 19 April, Washington bombarded Okinawa; it then departed for Puget Sound to receive a refit, having been in action for the majority of the time since its refit in March–April 1944. This lasted through V-J Day and the subsequent formal ceremony aboard Missouri, so Washington received orders to voyage to Philadelphia, where it arrived on 17 October. Here it was modified to have an additional 145 bunks so it could participate in Operation Magic Carpet. Sailing to Southampton with a reduced crew of 84 officers and 835 crew, it brought 185 army officers and 1,479 enlisted men back to the United States; this was the only voyage it would make in support of the operation. The battleship was placed into reserve at Bayonne, New Jersey on 27 June 1947, after only a little more than six years of service. Washington was never reactivated. Struck from the Naval Vessel Register on 1 June 1960—exactly 21 years to the day since its launch—she was sold on 24 May 1961 to be scrapped. (Note: While the official Dictionary of American Naval Fighting Ships entry on Washington and Garzke and Dulin's United States Battleships state that the ship was sold on 24 May 1961, the Naval Vessel Register and the Miramar Ship Index give a date of 6 June 1961.)

== Post-war alteration proposals ==
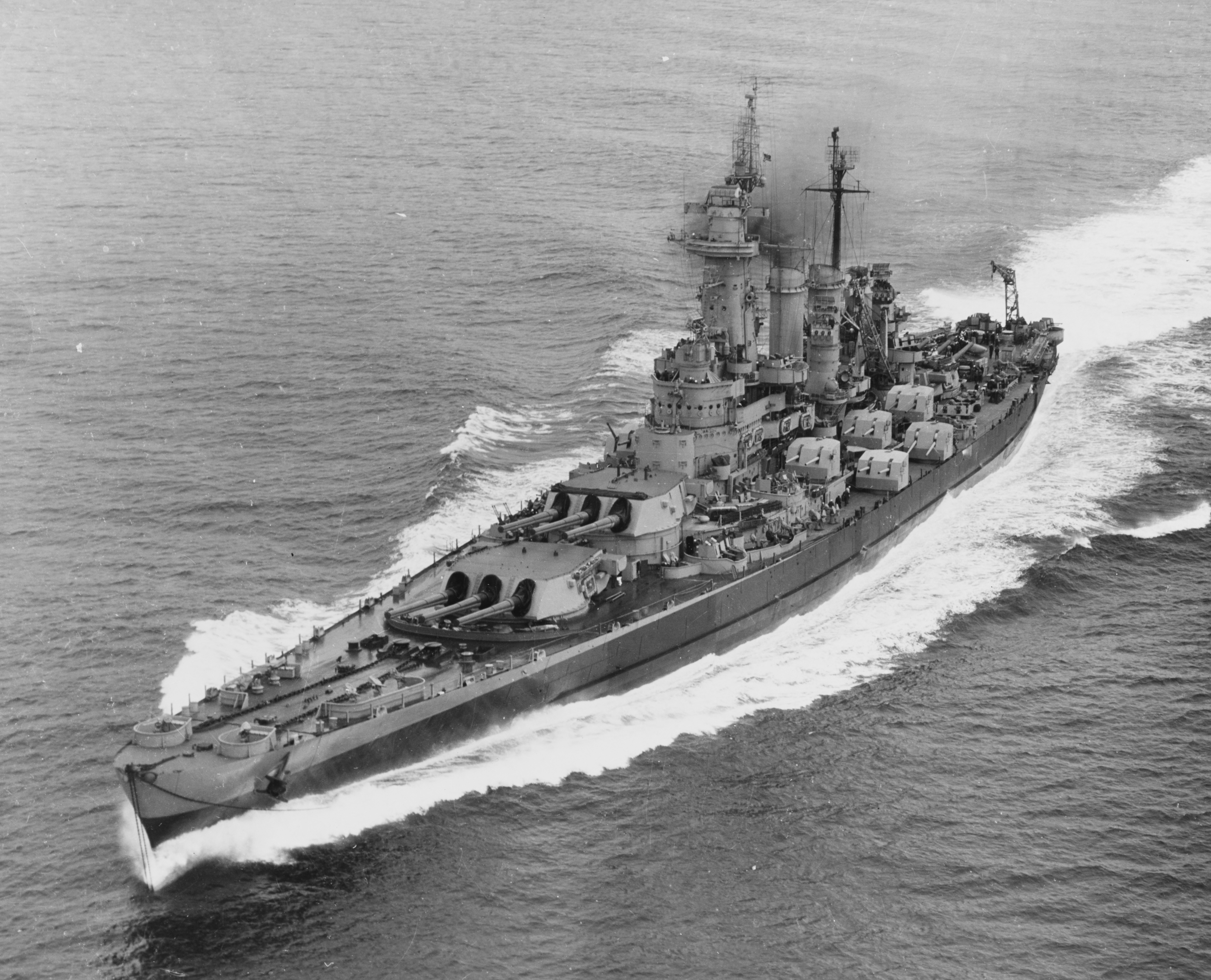
Washington steaming at high speed in Puget Sound during post-overhaul trials, 10 September 1945

North Carolina and Washington remained in active duty in the years immediately after the war, possibly because their crew accommodations were more comfortable and less cramped than the four South Dakotas. The ships received alterations during this period; the Ship Characteristics Board (SCB) directed in June 1946 that four of the quadruple-mounted 40 mm guns be removed, though only two were actually taken off each ship. The 20 mm weapons were also reduced at some point so that both ships were decommissioned with sixteen twin mounts. North Carolina and Washington were decommissioned on 27 June 1947 and subsequently moved to the reserve fleet.

In May 1954, SCB created a class improvement project for the North Carolinas which included twenty-four 3-inch/50 guns directed by six Mark 56s. A month later, the SCB chairman voiced his belief that the North Carolinas and South Dakotas would be excellent additions to task forces—if they could be faster. The Bureau of Ships then considered and discarded designs that would move these ships at 31 kn (57 km/h; 36 mph), four knots faster than their current attainable speed. In order for a North Carolina to attain 31 knots, 240,000 shp (180,000 kW) would be required. This, in turn, would necessitate the installation of an extremely large power plant, one which would not fit into the ship even if the third turret was removed. If the outer external belt armor were removed, 216,000 shp (161,000 kW) would still be required. However, no matter if the belt was taken off or not, all of the hull form aft would have to be greatly modified to accept larger propellers. The last strike against the project was the high estimated cost of $40 million, which did not include the cost of activating battleships that had been out of commission for ten years.

Later calculations proved that the North Carolinas could be lightened from 44,377 long tons to around 40,541 long tons (41,192 t), at which 210,000 shp would suffice. At the trial displacement figure of 38,400 long tons (39,000 t), even 186,000 shp (139,000 kW) would be enough; the 210,000 figure was derived from a 12.5% overestimation to account for a fouled bottom or bad weather. A similar power plant to the one used in the Iowa class (generating 212,000 shp (158,000 kW)) would be enough, and if the third turret was removed there would be no problems with weight, but there was not enough space within the North Carolinas. When compared, the current power plant measured 176 ft × 70 ft × 24 ft (53.6 m × 21.3 m × 7.3 m), but Iowa's was 256 ft × 72 ft × 26 ft (78.0 m × 21.9 m × 7.9 m). Lastly, there would be an issue with the propellers; the Iowa class' were 19 ft (5.8 m) wide, while the North Carolinas were 17 ft (5.2 m). In the end, no conversions were undertaken.

Designs for helicopter carriers also contained a plan for a conversion of the North Carolinas. At a cost of $30,790,000, the ships would have been able to embark 28 helicopters, 1,880 troops, 530 long tons (540 t) of cargo and 200,000 US gal (760,000 L) of oil. All of the 16-inch and 5-inch guns would have been removed, though the number one turret would have remained so that weights added on the stern half of the ship could be balanced. In place, the ships would have received sixteen 3-inch guns in twin mounts. Displacement would be lowered slightly to a fully loaded weight of about 41,930 long tons (42,600 t), while speed would not have changed. It was estimated that the ships could serve for about fifteen to twenty years at a cost of about $440,000 a year for maintenance. However, it was found that a purpose-built helicopter carrier would be more economical, so the plans were shelved.

== Ships in class ==
List of North Carolina-class battleships
Ship name	Hull no.	Builder	Laid down	Launched	Commissioned	Decommissioned	Fate
North Carolina	BB-55	New York Naval Shipyard	27 October 1937	13 June 1940	9 April 1941	27 June 1947	Struck 1 June 1960; museum ship since 29 April 1962 in Wilmington, North Carolina
Washington	BB-56	Philadelphia Naval Shipyard	14 June 1938	1 June 1940	15 May 1941	27 June 1947	Struck 1 June 1960; sold for scrap, 24 May 1961
