= USS Taconic =

1945 Adirondack-class command ship

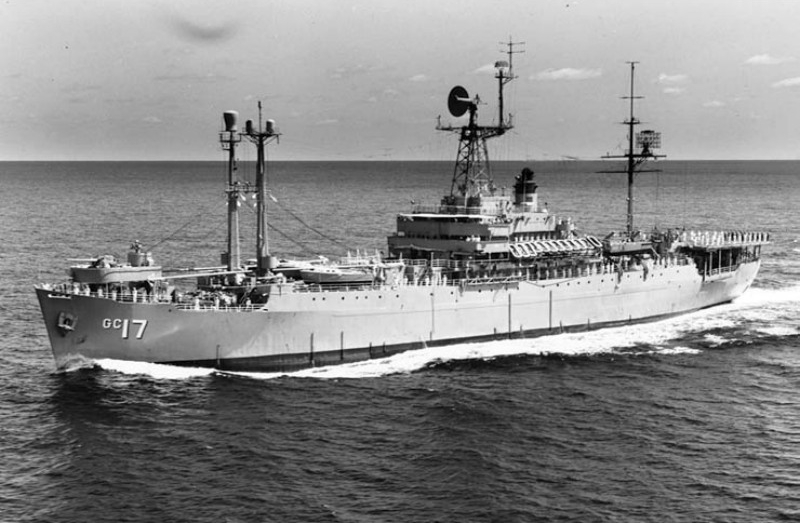

History

United States
- Name: USS Taconic
- Namesake: Taconic Mountains
- Builder: North Carolina Shipbuilding Company, Wilmington, North Carolina
- Laid down: 19 December 1944
- Launched: 10 February 1945
- Acquired: 6 March 1945
- Commissioned: 17 January 1946
- Decommissioned: 17 December 1969
- Reclassified: LCC-17, January 1969
- Stricken: 1 December 1976
- Home port: Naval Station Norfolk
- Nickname(s): Mighty "T"
- Fate: Sold for scrap, 6 April 1982

General characteristics
- Class & type: Adirondack-class command ship
- Displacement: 7,240 long tons (7,356 t) light; 13,910 long tons (14,133 t) full load
- Length: 459 ft 2 in (139.95 m)
- Beam: 63 ft (19 m)
- Draft: 24 ft (7.3 m)
- Propulsion: Geared turbine, 1 shaft, 6,000 shp (4,474 kW)
- Speed: 16.4 knots (30.4 km/h; 18.9 mph)
- Complement: 633
- Armament: 2 × 5"/38 caliber guns; 3 × twin 40 mm AA guns; 6 × single 20 mm AA guns

USS Taconic (AGC-17/LCC-17) was an Adirondack class amphibious force command ship of the U.S. Navy named after the Taconic Mountains in New York. She was laid down in December 1944 and decommissioned in January 1969.

== Construction ==
Taconic was laid down under Maritime Commission contract (MC hull 1710) at Wilmington, N.C., on 19 December 1944 by the North Carolina Shipbuilding Company; launched on 10 February 1945; sponsored by Mrs. O. W. Turner; acquired by the Navy on 6 March 1945; converted to an amphibious force flagship at the Atlantic Basin Iron Works in Brooklyn, New York; and commissioned there on 17 January 1946.

She was designed as an amphibious force flagship, a floating command post with advanced communications equipment and extensive combat information spaces to be used by the amphibious forces commander and landing force commander during large-scale operations.

== Service history ==
Upon commissioning, Taconic began a long tour of duty with the Atlantic Fleet. She served alternately as flagship of the Atlantic Fleet Amphibious Force and of Amphibious Groups 2 and 4. Between June 1946 and June 1949, she participated in CAMID I, II, and III, amphibious warfare exercises conducted in the Chesapeake Bay area and encompassing joint training for United States Military Academy cadets and United States Naval Academy midshipmen. Each spring, the amphibious force flagship joined the Atlantic Fleet maneuvers carried out in the Caribbean area.

In June 1949, following a yard overhaul at Norfolk, Virginia, she took part in Operation "Diaper," the transportation of Navy men and their dependents from the Canal Zone to Norfolk. Taconic remained in active service for 20 more years. During that entire period of time, she retained Norfolk as her home port.

In 1951 Taconic was featured as the command ship in the Richard Widmark film, The Frogmen. In February–March 1953, she sailed from Camp Lejeune, North Carolina to Vieques, Puerto Rico; Caracas, Venezuela; and Trinidad before returning to Camp Lejeune.

She participated in numerous exercises both with the Second and Sixth fleets, and with units of North Atlantic Treaty Organization nations. The amphibious force flagship was deployed to the Mediterranean Sea on eight occasions in those two decades; and, in the summer of 1958 she served as flagship of the Commander, Middle East Force, during the Lebanon Crisis. In November 1959, she served as communication and support ship to President Dwight D. Eisenhower during the Pakistan-Afghanistan-India leg of his visit to a number of European and Asian countries. When not deployed with the Sixth Fleet, she operated with the Second Fleet in the western Atlantic and in the Caribbean. The bulk of those operations consisted of exercises; but, on one occasion in March 1957, she carried President Eisenhower's limousines to Bermuda for his meeting with British Prime Minister Harold Macmillan.

In January 1963, Taconic patrolled the Haitian coast during political unrest in that country. She returned to the Caribbean area for special duty again in May and June 1965 during similar troubles in the Dominican Republic. In January 1969, at the beginning of her last year of service, Taconic was redesignated LCC-17.

After 12 months of operations and preparations for decommissioning, the amphibious force flagship was placed out of commission, in reserve, on 17 December 1969 at Norfolk, Virginia. She was berthed with the National Defense Reserve Fleet on the James River, Virginia. She was stricken from the Naval Vessel Register on 1 December 1976 and was sold for scrap to the Banty Corp on 6 April 1982.
