= Adirondack-class command ship =

Class of command ships of the United States Navy

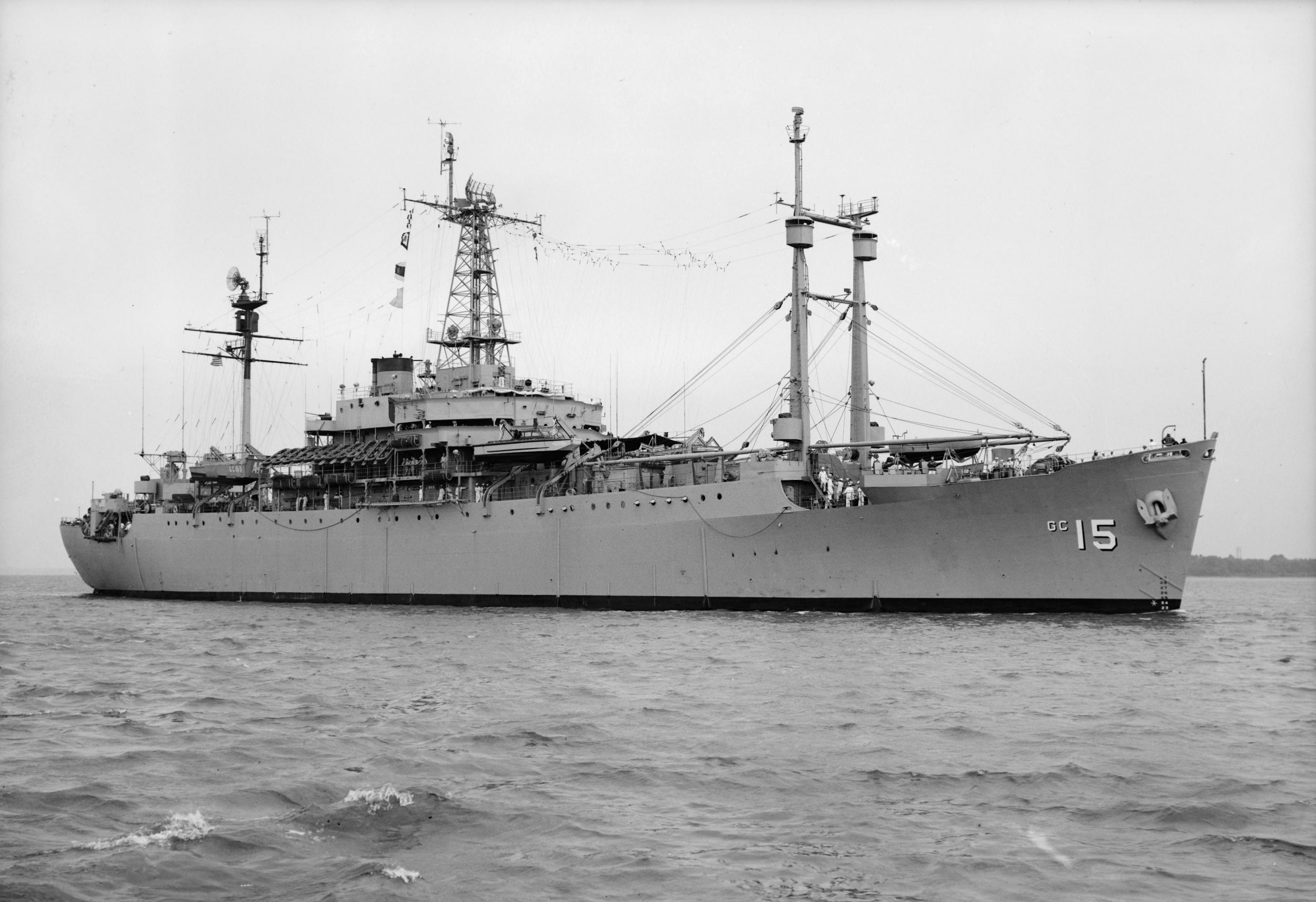
- USS Adirondack in 1951

Class overview
- Name: Adirondack class
- Builders: North Carolina Shipbuilding Co.
- Operators: United States Navy
- Preceded by: Mount McKinley class
- Succeeded by: Blue Ridge class
- Built: 1944–1945
- In service: 1945–1969
- Planned: 3
- Completed: 3
- Retired: 3

General characteristics
- Type: Command ship; type C2-S-AJ1
- Displacement: 7,240 t (7,126 long tons), light load; 12,750 t (12,549 long tons), full load
- Length: 459 ft 3 in (139.98 m)
- Beam: 63 ft (19 m)
- Draft: 24 ft 0 in (7.32 m)
- Installed power: 1 × propeller; 6,000 shp (4,474 kW); 450 psi (3,103 kPa)
- Propulsion: 1 × General Electric geared turbine; 2 × Combustion Engineering header-type boilers
- Speed: 16.4 knots (30.4 km/h; 18.9 mph)
- Capacity: 710 bbls diesel; 20,300 bbls NSFO
- Complement: 54 officers; 579 enlisted
- Sensors & processing systems: As designed: 1 × AN/SPS-6 air-search radar; 1 × SP fighter-direction radar; Modernization: 1 × AN/SPS-6 air-search radar; 1 × AN/SPS-8 height-finder radar; 1 × AN/SPS-10 surface-search radar; 1 × AN/SPS-29 early-warning radar
- Armament: 2 × single 5"/38 caliber guns; 6 × single Oerlikon 20 mm cannons; 4 × twin Bofors 40 mm guns
- Aviation facilities: Helicopter deck

The Adirondack-class command ship was a ship class of command ships of the United States Navy during World War II and the Cold War. All 3 ships were converted from the Type C2-S-AJ1 cargo ships.

== Development ==
Three type C2 cargo ships were converted into command ships for the United States Navy throughout the later stages of World War II. After the war, all were modernized with new radars and decommissioned by 1969 to later be scrapped.

The ship's hull remained nearly the same but with new equipment to carry out her purpose now placed on deck alongside several cranes. The ships' armaments had been slightly changed and relocated in order for the ships to carry out their new roles. All ships served in the Pacific Theater until the end of the war with no ships lost in combat.

== Ships in the class ==
Adirondack class command ship								
Hull no.	Name	Builder	Laid down	Launched	Commissioned	Recommissioned	Decommissioned	Fate
AGC-15	Adirondack	North Carolina Shipbuilding Co.	18 November 1944	13 January 1945	2 September 1945	4 April 1951	9 February 1955	Scrapped, 7 November 1972
AGC-16 / LCC-16	Pocono	North Carolina Shipbuilding Co.	30 November 1944	25 January 1945	29 December 1945	18 August 1951	16 September 1971	Scrapped, 9 December 1981
AGC-17 / LCC-17	Taconic	North Carolina Shipbuilding Co.	19 December 1944	10 February 1945	17 January 1946	-	17 December 1969	Scrapped, 1 March 1982
