= SS Eclipse =

SS Eclipse may refer to the following ships:

- SS Eclipse (1931), a British-flagged tanker damaged by the U-564 on 4 May 1942; renamed Ionian Skipper in 1950; broken up in 1954
- SS Eclipse (1943), a Type C2-S-AJ1 ship built by North Carolina Shipbuilding; transferred to the United States Navy in December 1943; as USS Mount Olympus (AGC-8) was the lead ship of her class of command ship; scrapped in 1973
