= USS Estes =

United States Navy amphibious force command ship

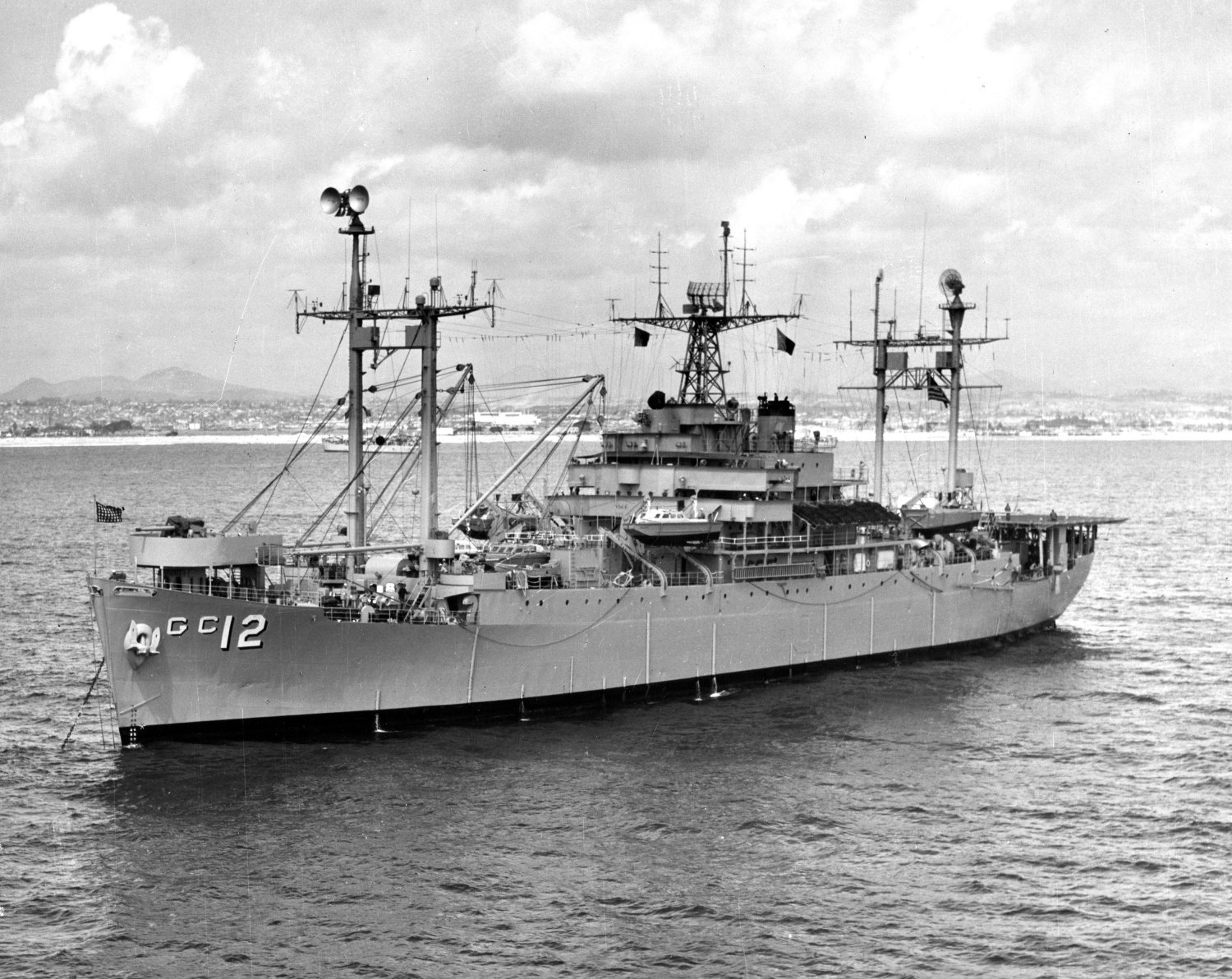
- USS Estes (AGC-12)

History

United States
- Name: USS Estes
- Builder: North Carolina Shipbuilding Company, Wilmington, North Carolina
- Laid down: 25 August 1943
- Launched: 1 November 1943
- Acquired: 22 February 1944
- Commissioned: 9 October 1944
- Decommissioned: 30 June 1949
- Recommissioned: 31 January 1951
- Decommissioned: 31 October 1969
- Stricken: 30 July 1976
- Honours and awards: 2 battle stars (WWII); 2 battle stars (Korea); 6 campaign stars (Vietnam)
- Fate: Sold for scrap, 1 December 1977

General characteristics
- Class & type: Mount McKinley-class amphibious command ship
- Displacement: 7,240 long tons (7,356 t)
- Length: 459 ft 2 in (139.95 m)
- Beam: 63 ft (19 m)
- Draft: 24 ft (7.3 m)
- Speed: 16 knots (30 km/h; 18 mph)
- Complement: 633
- Armament: 1 × 5 in (127 mm)/38 caliber gun

USS Estes (AGC-12) was a Mount McKinley-class amphibious force command ship. It is officially named after "A mountain peak and national park in Colorado."

She was designed as an amphibious force flagship, a floating command post with advanced communications equipment and extensive combat information spaces to be used by the amphibious forces commander and landing force commander during large-scale operations.

== Construction and career ==
Estes was launched on 1 November 1943 at the North Carolina Shipbuilding Company in Wilmington, North Carolina, as Morning Star. The ship was acquired by the Navy on 22 February 1944 and commissioned on 9 October 1944.

On 20 November 1944, Estes arrived at Pearl Harbor from Naval Station Norfolk, and after training, broke the flag of Rear Admiral William H. P. Blandy, Commander, Amphibious Group One. She sailed from Pearl Harbor on 10 January 1945 for rehearsal landings in the Marianas, and on 16 February arrived off Iwo Jima. As flagship for TF 52, Estes served as control center for the pre-invasion bombardment and the work of underwater demolition teams preparing the beaches for the assault. It remained off the island through the landings of 19 February, receiving wounded and supplying and repairing small craft. It arrived at Ulithi on 11 March to make final preparations for the Okinawa assault.

=== 1945 ===
Again flagship for TF 52, the amphibious support force, Estes was off Okinawa on 24 March 1945. It landed an underwater demolition group, then sailed with the bombardment group, directing the pre-invasion pounding of the beaches and Japanese strong points. Using information gained from its contacts with the radar picket destroyers, it controlled aircraft carrier planes protecting the vast concentration of shipping assembled for the assault on 1 April. After almost a month off the bitterly contested island, it sailed on 20 April to replenish at Saipan and carry Admiral Blandy to Pearl Harbor, where he and his staff disembarked on 19 May.

Estes continued to San Francisco for overhaul, and equipment installation designed to make the ship even more effective. On 20 July, it embarked Rear Admiral R. O. Davis, Commander, Amphibious Group 13, and on 8 August sailed for the Philippines. It arrived at Leyte on 28 August for occupation duty, coordinating the lifting of troops from the Philippines to Japan. After cruising widely in the Philippines on this duty, Estes sailed for Shanghai, and upon its arrival on 7 November, broke the flag of Admiral Thomas C. Kinkaid, Commander, 7th Fleet. Before it had completed its tour of occupation duty along the Chinese coast, for part of which it was homeported at Tsingtao, the ship served as flagship for three succeeding commanders of the 7th Fleet, Vice Admiral Daniel E. Barbey, Admiral Charles M. Cooke, and Admiral Oscar C. Badger II.

=== 1946 ===
In June 1946, Estes became flagship for Naval Forces, Western Pacific, and continued to cruise between Tsingtao and Hong Kong, aside from a 1947 overhaul at Bremerton, until 29 January 1949, when it departed Tsingtao for San Francisco. Arriving on 16 February, it lay at San Francisco and San Diego until its decommissioning at Hunter's Point, San Francisco and being placed in reserve on 30 June 1949.

=== 1950s ===
Estes was recommissioned on 31 January 1951, and after training off San Diego, sailed on 20 June for Yokosuka and Inchon, where from 25 July to 6 August, it served as flagship for Vice Admiral I. N. Kiland, Commander, Amphibious Force, Pacific. The ship carried successive Commanders, Amphibious Group One, through the remainder of this tour of duty in the Far East, during which it operated off Korea and in exercises off Japan.

Returning to San Diego on 19 April 1952, Estes carried high-ranking observers to the Marshall Islands for nuclear weapons tests in the fall of 1952.

With Rear Admiral F.S. Withington, USN, Commander Amphibious Group 3 and Commander Task Force 9, embarked, Estes left San Diego on 6 July 1953, setting course for Kodiak, Alaska. This time, the purpose of "Operation Blue Nose," as it was called, was to resupply government installations—the "DEW Line"—in the far north. Estes arrived at Kodiak one week out of San Diego. Proceeding north, the personnel of TF 9 were officially inducted into the "Honorary Order of the Arctic" as "Blue Noses" when the force crossed the Arctic Circle on 19 July. While at anchor at Icy Cape, Estes received news that a truce had been signed in Korea. Continuing north to Wainwright on 31 July, Estes pressed on to Point Barrow the following day. At anchor off Point Barrow, Estes fell temporary victim to a shift in the wind which allowed pack ice to move inshore, immobilizing the ship for the better part of a week. The icebreaker USCGC Northwind freed Estes, and the transports Electra and Skagit, from the icy confines of the anchorage. The resupply mission complete, Estes set course for its home port of San Diego on 9 August.

Between January and May 1954, it again sailed for atomic weapons tests at Eniwetok, and on 6 July cleared for the Far East. As control ship for "Operation Passage to Freedom", the evacuation of refugees from Communist North Vietnam, Estes operated from Haiphong from 18 August to 29 October. Between 6 and 11 February 1955 it aided the evacuation of the Tachen Islands resulting from the Taiwan Strait Crisis.

Estes returned to San Diego on 22 May 1955, operating out of there for the next year. Between March and July 1956, it was again in the Marshalls for weapons tests, and on 31 January 1957 sailed for Yokosuka, where it provided quarters and communications facilities until April, sailing then to visit Hong Kong. It returned to stateside duty on 15 May, voyaging to Pearl Harbor in July and August.

The next year found Estes sailing north in July to ports in British Columbia, and again in August to call at Seattle. During its 1959 tour of duty in the Far East it directed important amphibious operations off Japan, Okinawa, and Korea, and exercises off Borneo with ships of the Royal Navy and Royal New Zealand Navy.

=== 1960s ===
It returned to San Diego in August, and through 1962 operated along the west coast, twice visiting the Pacific Northwest.

Estes was deployed to South Vietnam between June and October 1965, August 1966 to January 1967, February to July 1968 and, finally, from August to September 1969. It received the Meritorious Unit Commendation for operations in Vietnam in January 1967. The USS Estes Commanding Officer was Captain Edward Rogers. The XO was CDR Gus Cheatham, and Navigator LCDR Edward McCarthy.

On 31 October 1969, Estes was decommissioned for the final time.

== Awards ==
- Meritorious Unit Commendation
- Asiatic-Pacific Campaign Medal with two battle stars
- World War II Victory Medal
- Navy Occupation Medal
- China Service Medal
- National Defense Service Medal with one star
- Korean Service Medal with two battle stars
- Armed Forces Expeditionary Medal
- Vietnam Service Medal with six campaign stars
- United Nations Korea Medal
- Philippine Liberation Medal
- Republic of Vietnam Gallantry Cross Unit Citation - 2 awards
- Republic of Vietnam Campaign Medal
- Republic of Korea War Service Medal
