= SS Storm King =

SS Storm King may refer to:

- SS Storm King (1920), a Design 1025 ship built for the United States Shipping Board by the Newburgh Shipyard; wrecked on Cape Negre, Tunisia on 13 June 1926
- SS Storm King (1943), the original name for the Type C2-S-AJ1 United States Navy transport USS Storm King (AP-171); transferred to the United States Maritime Commission in 1946; renamed Santa Cruz (1947), Gulf Farmer (1947), Ranger (1964); broken up in 1970
