= USS Ottawa (AKA-101) =

Naval cargo ship

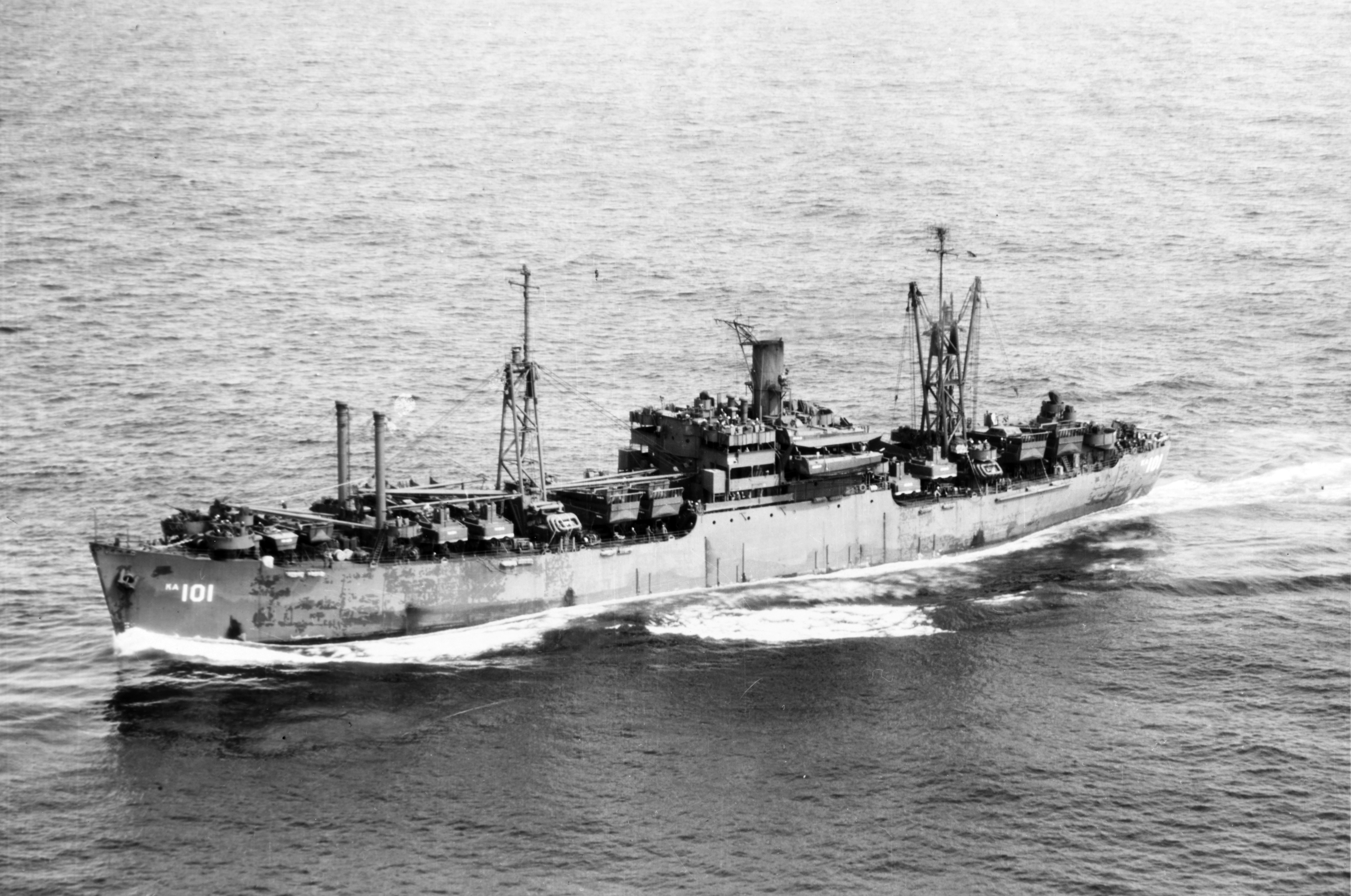

History

United States
- Name: USS Ottawa
- Namesake: Ottawa County, Kansas; Ottawa County, Michigan; Ottawa County, Ohio; Ottawa County, Oklahoma
- Builder: North Carolina Shipbuilding Company, Wilmington, North Carolina
- Laid down: 5 October 1944
- Launched: 29 November 1944
- Commissioned: 8 February 1945
- Decommissioned: 10 January 1947
- Stricken: 14 March 1947
- Fate: Sold into merchant service, 1947; Lost, 1951

General characteristics
- Class & type: Tolland-class attack cargo ship
- Displacement: 14,160 long tons (14,387 t)
- Length: 459 ft (140 m)
- Beam: 63 ft (19 m)
- Draft: 25 ft 9 in (7.85 m)
- Speed: 17 knots (31 km/h; 20 mph)
- Complement: 425
- Armament: 1 × 5"/38 caliber gun

USS Ottawa (AKA-101) was a Tolland-class attack cargo ship in service with the United States Navy from 1945 to 1947. She was sold into commercial service and was lost in 1951.

== History ==
USS Ottawa (AKA-101) was named after counties in the states of Kansas, Michigan, Ohio and Oklahoma. She was laid down as a Type C2-S-AJ3 ship on 5 October 1944 under a Maritime Commission Contract (MC hull 1698) by North Carolina Shipbuilding Co., Wilmington, North Carolina; launched on 29 November 1944, sponsored by Mrs. William S. Pritchard; acquired and commissioned at the Charleston Navy Yard on 8 February 1945.

=== World War II, 1945 ===
After outfitting at Charleston, Ottawa conducted shakedown training out of Norfolk, Virginia, completing those evolutions on 28 February 1945. With Navy cargo loaded at Norfolk, the ship sailed on 11 March 1945, escorted by the high speed transport Register (APD-92), and reached the Canal Zone on 17 March. Transiting the Panama Canal on 17–18 March, she reported for duty with the Pacific Fleet on the latter date, and pushed on for Pearl Harbor, arriving there on 1 April. After discharging her cargo at Pearl, she transported a cargo of marine ammunition from Honolulu to Maui, then departed on 21 April for the California ports of San Pedro, Port Hueneme and San Francisco, and Seattle, Washington, to load explosives and construction equipment, returning to Pearl Harbor on 23 May.

Ottawa proceeded alone from Pearl to Eniwetok, Marshalls, and Ulithi, Carolines, then departed the latter in convoy on 27 June 1945 bound for Okinawa. Completing discharge of cargo on 12 July, she then sailed via Ulithi and Manus for Espiritu Santo, arriving there on 28 July to load Army and Navy vehicles for delivery to Guam and Saipan. The ship departed Espiritu Santo, New Hebrides, on 8 August and reached Apra Harbor, Guam, Marianas, on 15 August - V-J Day. After discharging her cargo at Guam, she proceeded to Saipan and completed unloading there on 28 August.

=== Post-war activities, 1945–1946 ===
Following a ten-day buoy availability to clean her boilers, Ottawa embarked elements of the 2nd Marines and their equipment and departed Saipan on 18 September 1945 for Nagasaki and the occupation of Japan. After disembarking the Marines and their gear at Nagasaki, she sailed for the Philippines in convoy on 26 September, reaching Subic Bay on 4 October. Proceeding immediately thence in convoy SL-48, she arrived off Lingayen later the same day. After having exchanged landing boats at Subic and Lingayen, she steamed to Manila in convoy LM-10 (5–6 October), to provision. Ottawa then returned to Lingayen on 11–12 October. Embarking soldiers of the 6th Army and their equipment, earmarked for Nagoya, Japan, she sailed on 23 October in convoy LN-2, reaching her destination on 28 October.

After discharging occupation troops and gear, Ottawa embarked Army and Navy passengers for transportation back to the U.S., departing Nagoya on 11 November 1945. Arriving at Lingayen Gulf four days later to load boats and embark more passengers, Ottawa shifted to Subic Bay for water, provisions, more boats and passengers, then sailed for home on 18 November. After pausing briefly at Pearl Harbor en route (2–3 December), the ship reached San Francisco on 9 December.

Assigned to Joint Task Force (JTF) 1 in place of Skagit (AKA-105), Ottawa, her crew reduced to 67 men, then loaded construction material at Port Hueneme, California, and with a contingent of Construction Battalion men embarked, sailed for Bikini Atoll, arriving there on 20 March 1946. Together with sistership Rolette (AKA-99) in the Transport Unit (Task Unit 1.3.1), Ottawa served as barracks and materiel stores ships for the 200 Seabees embarked between them and deployed in "Operation Crossroads". On 30 June, Ottawa departed the lagoon and, from a vantage point in excess of 15 miles from "Ground Zero" witnessed the air detonation (Test Able) the following day, then returned to the lagoon later the same day (1 July). She performed routine duties in the lagoon at Bikini until the afternoon of 24 July, when she again departed to observe the shallow underwater detonation (Test Baker) from a vantage point 25 miles to the east. Following the Baker blast, Ottawa proceeded to Rongelap Atoll, about 65 miles east of Bikini, and with the exception of a two and a half-hour visit to Bikini on 28 July, did not return to the waters inside Bikini lagoon for any length of time until the last day of July. Wrapping up her work in those waters with JTF-1 on 2 August, she sailed that day for Port Hueneme, arriving there on 14 August and being released from "Crossroads" simultaneously.

Ottawa then shuttled between San Francisco, Port Hueneme, and San Pedro into the autumn of 1946, ultimately departing the last port on 28 October 1946 for Panama. Arriving at Balboa on 9 November, she cleared Cristobal on 16 November. Proceeding via Jacksonville, Florida, and Bayonne, New Jersey, the ship ultimately reported to Commander, 5th Naval District, for final disposition, reaching Norfolk on 19 December.

=== Decommissioning and fate ===
Reporting to the Norfolk Naval Shipyard on the last day of 1946, Ottawa was decommissioned there on 10 January 1947. Returned to the Maritime Commission on 28 January, she was stricken from the Naval Vessel Register on 14 March 1947.

Acquired by Luckenbach Steamship Lines, Inc., and renamed Andrea F. Luckenbach, she served under the Luckenbach house flag until lost due to stranding three miles off Kohala Point, Kauai, Territory of Hawaii, on 11 March 1951.
