= Mount McKinley-class command ship =

Class of command ships of the United States Navy

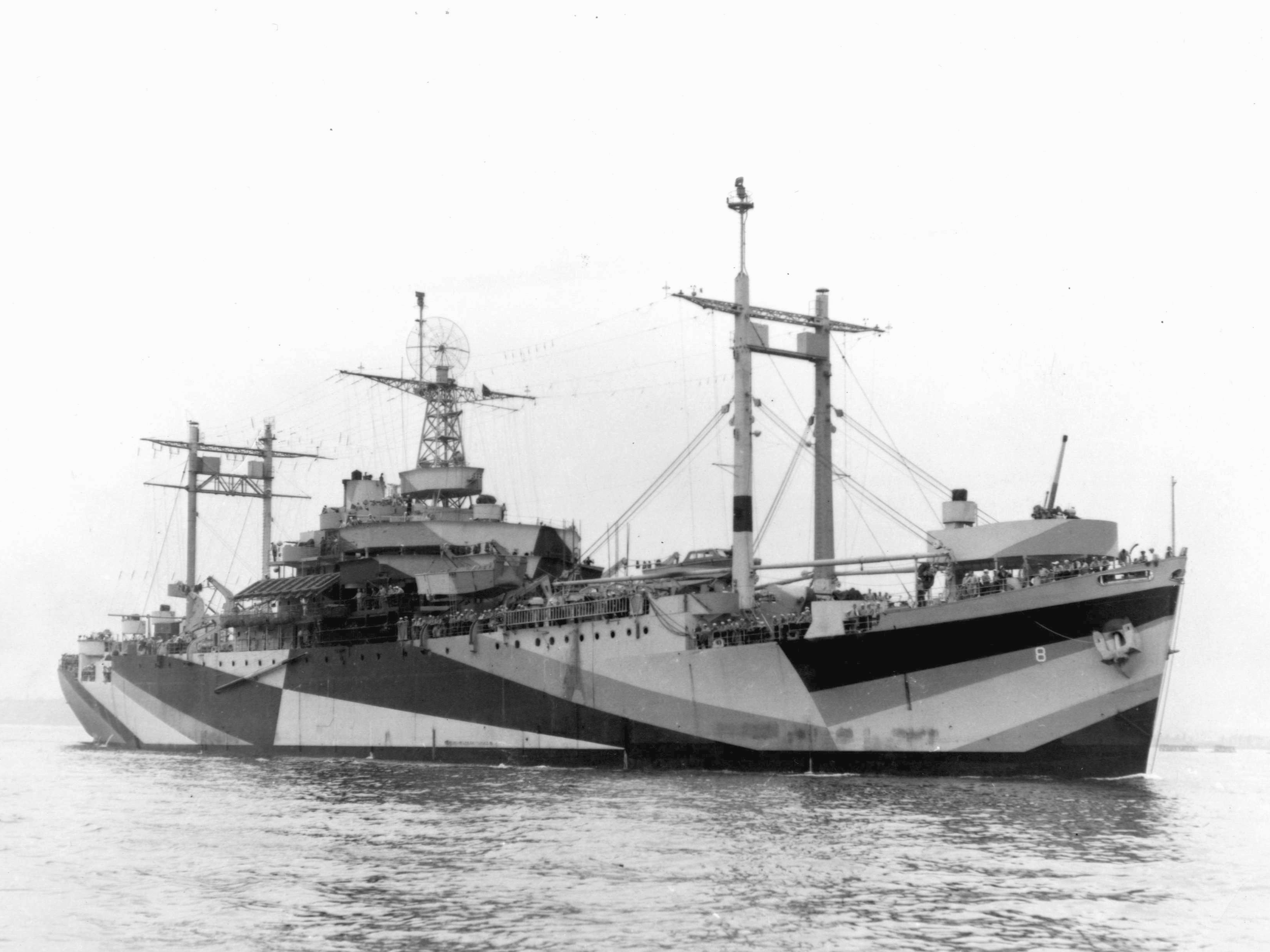
- USS Mount Olympus in 1944

Class overview
- Name: Mount McKinley class
- Builders: North Carolina Shipbuilding Co.
- Operators: United States Navy
- Preceded by: Appalachian class
- Succeeded by: Adirondack class
- Built: 1943–1944
- In service: 1944–1972
- Completed: 8
- Retired: 8

General characteristics
- Type: Command ship; type C2-S-AJ1
- Displacement: 7,500 t (7,382 long tons), light load; 12,580 t (12,381 long tons), full load
- Length: 459 ft 3 in (139.98 m)
- Beam: 63 ft (19 m)
- Draft: 24 ft 0 in (7.32 m)
- Installed power: 1 × propeller; 6,000 shp (4,474 kW); 450 psi (3,103 kPa)
- Propulsion: 1 × General Electric geared turbine; 2 × Babcock & Wilcox header-type boilers
- Speed: 16.4 knots (30.4 km/h; 18.9 mph)
- Capacity: 700 bbls diesel; 22,650 bbls NSFO
- Troops: 103 officers; 338 enlisted
- Complement: 54 officers; 568 enlisted
- Sensors & processing systems: As designed: 1 × SK-2 air-search radar; 1 × SP fire-direction radar; Modernization: 1 × AN/SPS-6 air-search radar; 1 × AN/SPS-8 height-finder radar; 1 × AN/SPS-10 surface-search radar; 1 × AN/SPS-29 early-warning radar
- Armament: 2 × single 5"/38 caliber guns; 10 × twin Oerlikon 20 mm cannons; 4 × twin Bofors 40 mm guns
- Aviation facilities: Helicopter deck

The Mount McKinley-class command ship was a ship class of command ships of the United States Navy during World War II and the Cold War. All eight ships were converted from Type C2-S-AJ1 cargo ships.

== Development ==
Eight type C2 cargo ships were converted into command ships for the US Navy throughout the middle to later stages of World War II. After the war, all were modernized with new radars and all decommissioned by the 1970s to be later scrapped.

The ship's hull remained nearly the same but with new equipment to carry out her purpose now placed on deck alongside several cranes. The ships' armaments had been slightly changed and relocated in order for the ships to carry out their new roles. All ships served in the Pacific Theater until the end of the war with no ships lost in combat.

== Ships in the class ==
Mount McKinley-class command ship							
Hull no.	Name	Builder	Laid down	Launched	Commissioned	Decommissioned	Fate
AGC-7 / LCC-7	Mount McKinley	North Carolina Shipbuilding Co.	31 July 1943	27 September 1943	1 May 1944	26 March 1970	Scrapped, 22 September 1977
AGC-8	Mount Olympus	North Carolina Shipbuilding Co.	3 August 1943	3 October 1943	4 May 1944	4 April 1956	Scrapped, 22 January 1973
AGC-9	Wasatch	North Carolina Shipbuilding Co.		8 October 1943	20 May 1944	30 August 1946	Scrapped
AGC-10	Auburn	North Carolina Shipbuilding Co.	14 August 1943	19 October 1943	20 July 1944	7 May 1947	Scrapped, 17 February 1961
AGC-11 / LCC-11	Eldorado	North Carolina Shipbuilding Co.		26 October 1943	26 August 1944	8 November 1972	Scrapped, 25 April 1974
AGC-12 / LCC-12	Estes	North Carolina Shipbuilding Co.		1 November 1943	9 October 1944	31 October 1969	Scrapped, 1 December 1977
AGC-13	Panamint	North Carolina Shipbuilding Co.	1 September 1943	9 November 1943	14 October 1944	January 1947	Scrapped, 20 March 1961
AGC-14	Teton	North Carolina Shipbuilding Co.	9 November 1943	5 February 1944	18 October 1944	30 August 1946	Scrapped, 26 March 1962
