= USS Paricutin =

Ammunition ship of the United States Navy

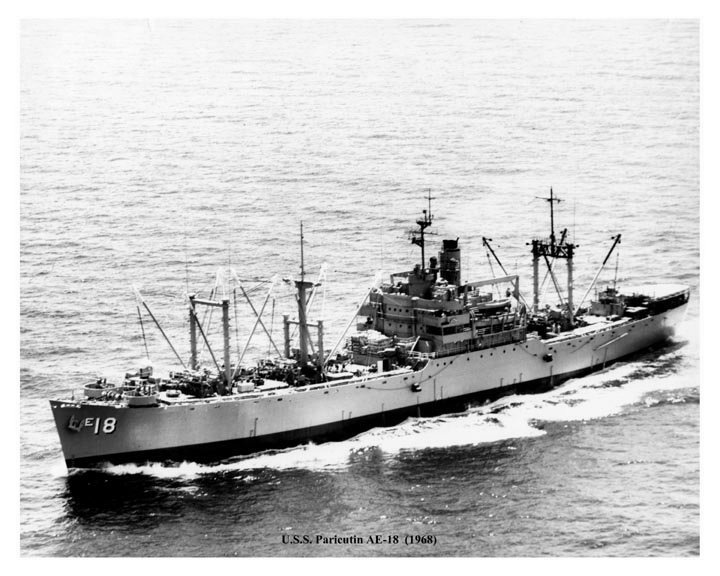
- USS Paracutin, underway, location unknown

History

United States
- Name: USS Paricutin
- Namesake: Parícutin, a volcano
- Laid down: 7 December 1944
- Launched: 30 January 1945
- Commissioned: 3 March 1945; 28 July 1950
- Decommissioned: 30 April 1948
- Stricken: 1 June 1973
- Fate: Sold for scrapping 16 October 1975

General characteristics
- Length: 459 ft 2 in (140 m)
- Beam: 63 ft (19.2 m)
- Draught: 28 ft 3 in (8.6 m)
- Propulsion: Geared turbine; 1 × shaft; 6,000 shp (4.5 MW)
- Speed: 16 knots (30 km/h)
- Capacity: 7,700 long tons (7,800 t) deadweight
- Complement: 267 officers and enlisted

USS Paricutin (AE-18) was laid down under Maritime Commission Contract, 7 December 1944 by North Carolina Shipbuilding Company, Wilmington, N.C. as MC hull 1708; launched 30 January 1945; sponsored by Senora Arias De Garcia Jurado, Mexican Embassy, Washington, D.C.; acquired and commissioned 3 March 1945. It was a Wrangler Class ammunition ship.

After shakedown she joined the Pacific Fleet and was engaged in the transfer of excess ammunition from the forward areas in the Pacific to Bangor, Washington, and Port Chicago, California until 20 November 1947 when she was ordered to Mare Island Naval Shipyard for inactivation. On 30 April 1948, Paricutin was placed out of commission in reserve and berthed with the San Francisco Group of the Pacific Reserve Fleet.

Reactivated 24 June 1950, due to the Korean War, Paricutin recommissioned 28 July 1950 and was assigned to Service Squadron 1. She sailed for the Far East 8 October and arrived Japan 24 October. Operating from U.S. Fleet Activities Sasebo, she rearmed the carrier task forces off both coasts of Korea, surface bombardment and blockading forces, and shore based Marine air groups. Paricutin spent 18 months servicing combat units before returning to the States in March 1952. On 31 July she sailed again for operations off Korea, this time spending nearly seven months on the line rearming warships. She returned to San Francisco 19 March 1953 and was stateside when the s:Korean Armistice Agreement was announced in July.

August 1953 saw the beginning of a series of peacetime annual WestPac deployments for Paricutin, as she sailed from San Francisco, bound for Sasebo, Japan, on the 7th. These normally consisted of six or seven months of operations and training with Seventh Fleet units with port calls at Hong Kong, Japan, Korea, the Philippines, Taiwan, Guam and other Pacific islands. Paricutin continued these deployments into the mid-1960s when she was directed to support American operations in Vietnam. She has since supplied Seventh Fleet units with ammunition on a rotational basis with her sister ships during Western Pacific deployments, while fulfilling her commitments at home, in coastal operations, assigned by Commander, Service Force Pacific (ServPac).

Into 1970, Paricutin continued a vital service to the U.S. Navy.

The ship was struck from the Navy List on 1 June 1973 and then transferred to MARAD for disposal.

== Awards, Citations and Campaign Ribbons ==
- American Campaign Medal
- Asiatic-Pacific Campaign Medal
- World War II Victory Medal
- National Defense Service Medal (2)
- Korean Service Medal (7)
- Armed Forces Expeditionary Medal (2)
- Vietnam Service Medal (10)
- United Nations Service Medal
- Republic of Vietnam Campaign Medal
- Republic of Korea War Service Medal (retroactive)
