= USS Vermilion (AKA-107) =

Tolland-class attack cargo ship

Coordinates: 32.9502°N 78.6667°W

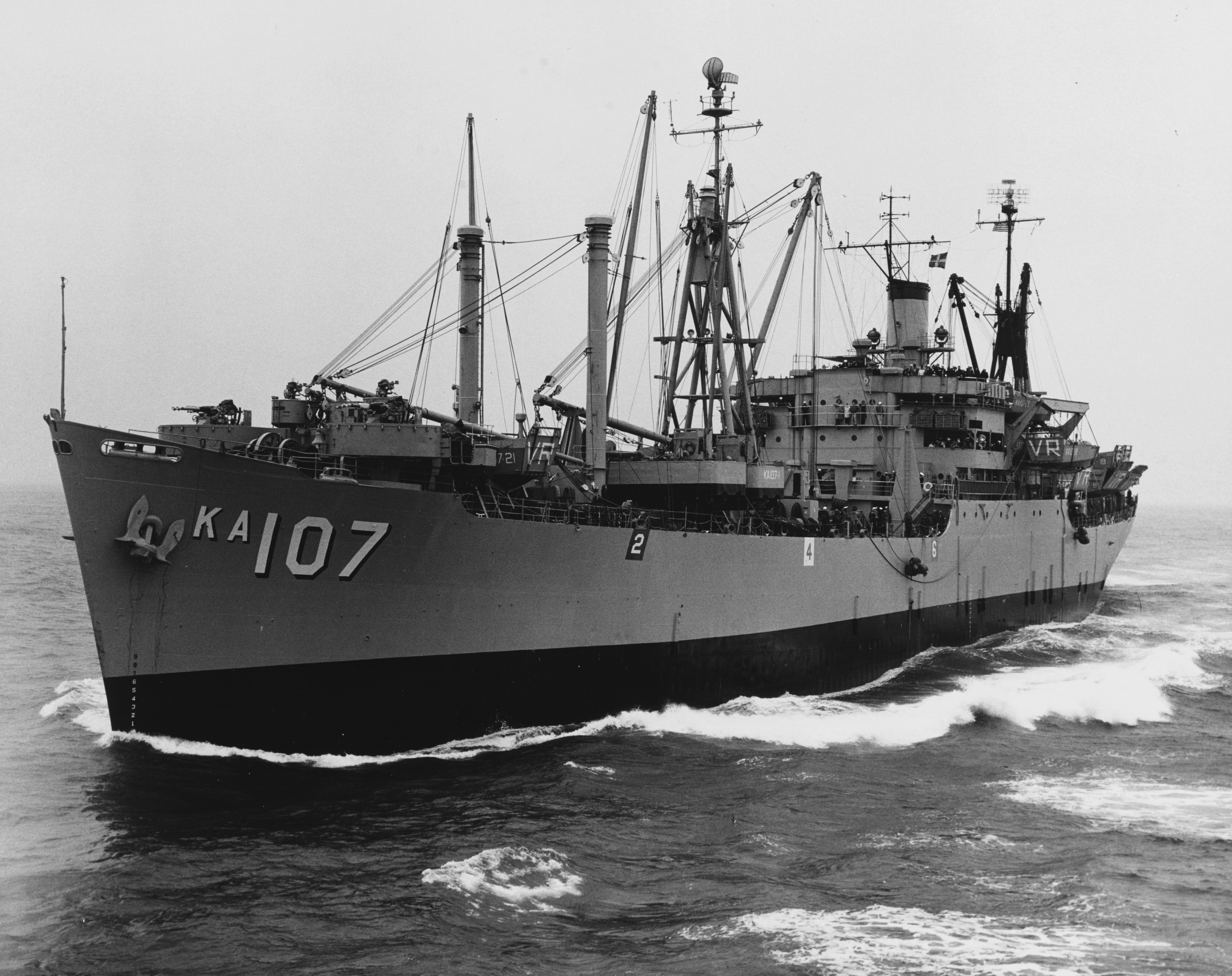
- Vermilion, circa in the 1950s

History

United States
- Name: USS Vermilion
- Namesake: Vermilion County, Illinois; Vermilion Parish, Louisiana
- Builder: North Carolina Shipbuilding Company, Wilmington, North Carolina
- Laid down: 17 October 1944
- Launched: 12 December 1944
- Commissioned: 23 June 1945
- Decommissioned: 26 August 1949
- Recommissioned: 16 October 1950
- Decommissioned: 13 April 1971
- Stricken: 1 January 1977
- Motto: Vincit Robor; (Latin: "Strength to Conquer")
- Fate: Sunk as artificial reef 24 August 1988

General characteristics
- Class & type: Tolland-class attack cargo ship
- Displacement: 13,910 long tons (14,133 t) full
- Length: 489 ft 2 in (149.10 m)
- Beam: 63 ft (19 m)
- Draft: 26 ft 4 in (8.03 m)
- Propulsion: GE geared turbine drive, 1 propeller, 6,000 shp (4,474 kW)
- Speed: 16.5 knots (30.6 km/h; 19.0 mph)
- Complement: 425
- Armament: 1 × 5"/38 caliber gun; 4 × twin 40 mm guns; 16 × single 20 mm guns

USS Vermilion (AKA-107/LKA-107), was a Tolland-class attack cargo ship of the United States Navy, named after a parish in southern Louisiana and a county in eastern Illinois. She served as a commissioned ship for 25 years and 9 months.

Tolland was laid down as a Type C2-S-AJ3 ship under a United States Maritime Commission contract (MC hull 1700) on 17 October 1944 by the North Carolina Shipbuilding Company in Wilmington, North Carolina and launched on 12 December 1944, sponsored by Mrs. Rex Freeman. She was delivered to the Navy on 23 December 1944 to be completed as a Navy attack cargo ship at the Todd Shipyard in Brooklyn, New York. She was commissioned at Brooklyn on 23 June 1945 with the hull code AKA-107, Captain F. B. Eggers commanding.

== Service history ==
=== 1945–1949 ===
Based at the Amphibious Naval Base, Little Creek, Virginia, the Vermilion was assigned to the Atlantic Fleet and spent over a year in shakedown and refresher training. In November 1946, she cruised to South American waters before assuming duty upon her return to Norfolk. For the next three years she took on standard Atlantic fleet operations, including midshipman training cruises, amphibious exercises, type training and reserve training cruises. She was then decommissioned on 26 August 1949 and berthed with the Reserve Fleet Group at Orange, Texas.

=== 1950–1959 ===
The outbreak of the Korean War in the summer of 1950 meant the Vermilion was recommissioned at Orange on 16 October 1950. However, though the war had prompted her return to active duty, she never saw service in the Far East. Instead, she was used to replace other Atlantic Fleet ships released for duty.

In the summer of 1951 the Vermilion took part in Operation Blue Jay, the first large-scale seaborne supply lift to the new airbase under construction at Thule, Greenland. She returned to Little Creek on 29 August 1951 and resumed operations with the Atlantic Fleet, before visiting Thule on a second supply mission during the summer of 1952. By 25 August she had once again returned to Little Creek and resumed Atlantic Fleet duty. During the winter she operated in the West Indies out of the base at Guantanamo Bay, Cuba before returning to Little Creek and Atlantic Fleet duty on 2 February 1953.

For the next five years, Vermilion participated in Atlantic Fleet amphibious exercises at Onslow Beach, North Carolina and in the Caribbean. She also conducted independent ship's exercises and made cruises the length of the Atlantic seaboard. She spent the second half of 1958 deployed in the Mediterranean Sea, returning to Little Creek and Atlantic Fleet duties in December.

=== 1960–1971 ===
Her routine of amphibious exercises and independent ship's exercises continued until the fall of 1962 when she was deployed to the West Indies to support the American quarantine of Cuba during the Cuban Missile Crisis. She then returned to Little Creek and her routine operations before deployment with the 6th Fleet in the Mediterranean beginning May 1963.

Vermilion returned to Little Creek on 17 October and began another four-year stint of operations along the Atlantic seaboard and in the Caribbean. In January 1968 she departed Morehead City, North Carolina, accompanied by Marine Air Control Squadron 6, bound for the Ryukyus via the Panama Canal and Pearl Harbor. She arrived in Buckner Bay, Okinawa on 22 February 1968 and departed three days later with Marine Air Control Squadron 8 embarked. The air squadron disembarked at Morehead City on 30 March before the Vermilion reached Norfolk the following day. Following a six-month overhaul at the Norfolk Naval Shipyard – during which she was redesignated LKA-107 – Vermilion resumed Atlantic Fleet operations in November, continuing to operate out of Norfolk for over three years.

=== Decommissioning ===
She was once again decommissioned on 13 April 1971 and then transferred to the Maritime Administration on 27 July 1971 to be laid up in the National Defense Reserve Fleet at James River, Virginia. Her name was struck from the Navy List on 1 January 1977.

On 19 February 1988 Vermilion was transferred to the South Carolina Department of Natural Resources, and on 24 August 1988 she was sunk in the Atlantic Ocean 40 nautical miles (46 mi; 74 km) off Georgetown, South Carolina, to form an artificial reef and recreational dive site. Bottom depth is 130 to 140 feet (40 to 43 m).
