= USS Washburn =

Cargo ship of the United States Navy

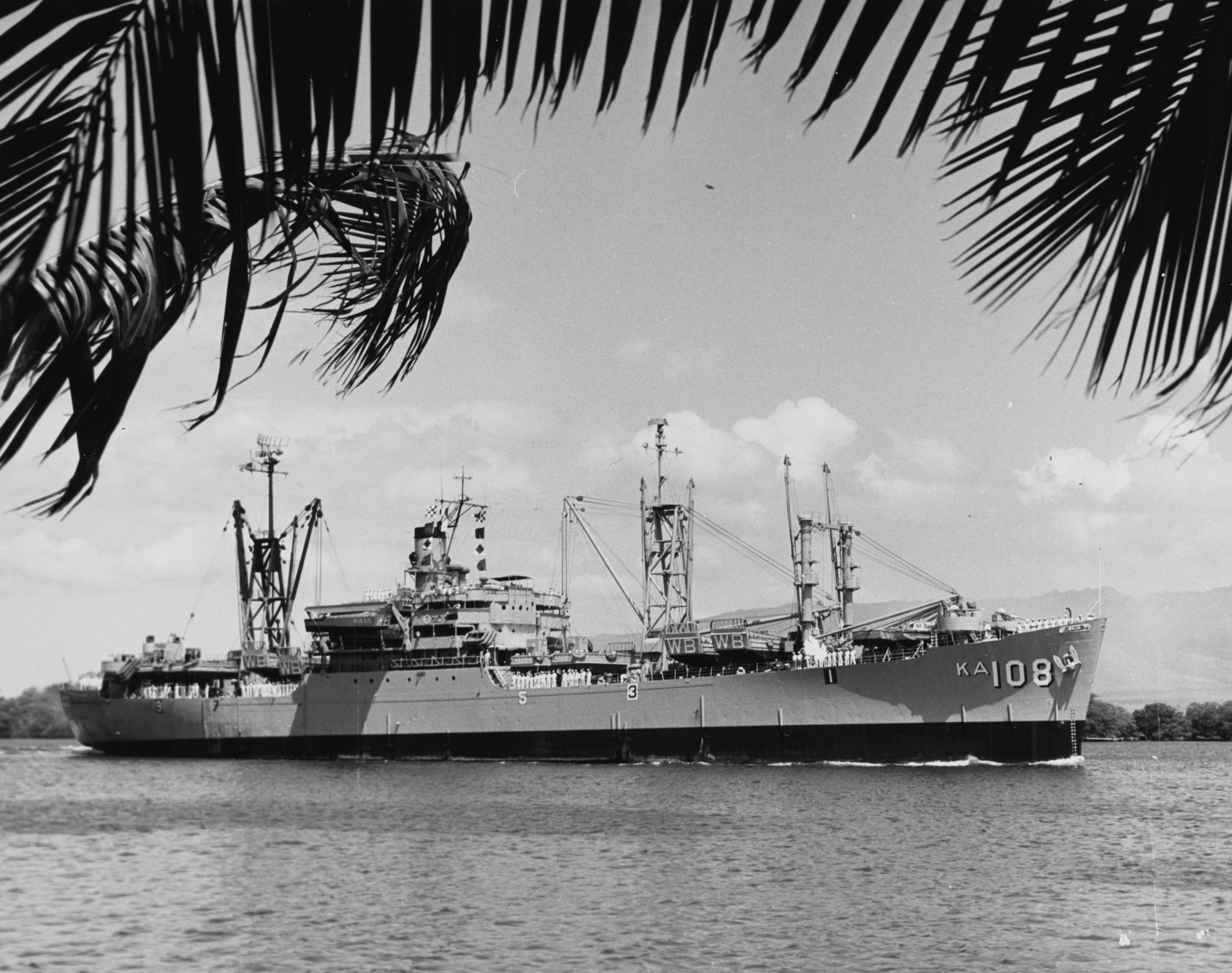

History

United States
- Name: USS Washburn
- Namesake: Washburn County, Wisconsin
- Builder: North Carolina Shipbuilding Company, Wilmington, North Carolina
- Laid down: 24 October 1944
- Launched: 18 December 1944
- Commissioned: 17 May 1945
- Decommissioned: 16 May 1970
- Reclassified: LKA-108, 1 January 1969
- Stricken: 1 October 1976
- Motto: "Voca Impedimenta"
- Honors and awards: 5 battle stars (Korea); 6 battle stars (Vietnam)
- Fate: Scrapped, 1980

General characteristics
- Class & type: Tolland-class attack cargo ship
- Displacement: 13,910 long tons (14,133 t) full
- Length: 459 ft 2 in (139.95 m)
- Beam: 63 ft (19 m)
- Draft: 26 ft 4 in (8.03 m)
- Propulsion: GE geared turbine drive, 1 propeller, 6,000 shp (4,474 kW)
- Speed: 16.5 knots (30.6 km/h; 19.0 mph)
- Complement: 425
- Armament: 1 × 5"/38 caliber gun; 4 × twin 40 mm guns; 16 × single 20 mm guns

USS Washburn (AKA-108) was a Tolland-class attack cargo ship in service with the United States Navy from 1945 to 1970 She was scrapped in 1980.

== History ==
Washburn was named after Washburn County, Wisconsin. She was laid down as a Type C2-S-AJ3 ship on 24 October 1944 at Wilmington, North Carolina, by the North Carolina Shipbuilding Company under a Maritime Commission contract (MC hull 1801); launched on 18 December 1944; sponsored by Maj. K. A. Towle, USMCR; delivered to the Navy in an incomplete state on 30 December 1944; and completed at the Todd-Hoboken shipyard at Hoboken, N.J., where she was commissioned on 17 May 1945.

=== World War II, 1945 ===
Following two weeks of shakedown training in the Virginia Capes area, Washburn departed Norfolk, Virginia, en route to the Mediterranean coast of France. She arrived in Marseille on the 26th and began loading Army troops and supplies bound for the Philippines. She stood out of Marseille on 11 July and arrived in Manila on 24 August, nine days after the cessation of hostilities.

=== Post-war activities, 1945–1950 ===
With the war ended, the attack cargo ship unloaded her passengers and cargo at Manila and began service in support of the occupation of former Japanese holdings in the Far East. She moved to Lingayen in northern Luzon to load soldiers of the 6th Army's 33rd Division for transportation to the Japanese home islands and occupation duty. She departed the Philippines soon thereafter and arrived at Wakayama on the island of Honshū, Japan, and disembarked her passengers.

For the remainder of the year, she carried passengers and equipment between various locales in the western Pacific in continued support of the American occupation. From January to March 1946, she conducted amphibious and fleet training in the eastern Pacific before returning to the Far East to resume her support missions for the occupation forces. In April, Washburn headed back east to resume her training schedule. That employment — broken only by a voyage to Alaskan waters in July 1948 for a resupply mission — lasted until November 1948.

At that point, the ship returned to the Orient once more for almost a year of duty in support of the occupation forces. During that time, she visited Okinawa, Iwo Jima, Pearl Harbor, and Qingdao in China. During the fall of 1949, she returned to the West Coast to participate in Operation "Miki", a large-scale, joint-service exercise staged out of Puget Sound, Washington, which simulated the invasion and defense of the Hawaiian Islands.

In February 1950, she transited the Panama Canal to return to the Atlantic for the first time since her maiden voyage. She participated in Operation "Port-rex", an Atlantic Fleet Amphibious Forces assault exercise held at a small island near Puerto Rico. After a liberty call at San Juan, Puerto Rico, at the operation's conclusion, she retransited the Panama Canal and resumed duty with the Pacific Fleet.

=== Korean War, 1950–1953 ===
That summer, the outbreak of hostilities in Korea called her back to the Far East. Following a resupply mission to Point Barrow, Alaska, Washburn turned west toward Japan; and, for about 18 months, she plied the waters between Japan and Korea keeping the flow of supplies and reinforcements to bolster the United Nations forces. She participated in the Inchon and Wonsan landings in September and, afterward, resumed her supply and reinforcement shuttles. In June 1951, she returned to the role for which she was designated by participating in the diversionary landings staged at Kangmung, Korea. After a resumption of Japan-to-Korea runs, which she conducted from July to November, she headed back to the United States, arriving on the West Coast on 16 December 1951.

Eastern Pacific operations, including another resupply run to Point Barrow in Alaska during June 1952, occupied her time until the spring of 1953. In March, she again voyaged to the Far East, visiting Nagoya and Sasebo in Japan and Pusan and Inchon in Korea. She stopped at the latter port during her participation in "Operation Big Switch", the mutual repatriation of prisoners of war at the end of the Korean War. In October, Washburn returned to the United States and resumed West Coast operations.

=== 1954–1964 ===
In October 1954, she set out upon an eight-month deployment to the Orient. She stopped at many already familiar ports — Nagoya, Sasebo, Pusan, Inchon, and Okinawa — and added some new ones to her itinerary — Yokosuka in Japan, Subic Bay in the Philippines, the island of Taiwan, and, most notably, the Tachen Islands. The last-named group of islands came into her sphere of operations because of their proximity to mainland China and the consequent communist threat to their Nationalist Chinese populations and garrisons. Early in February 1955, Washburn and the other ships of Rear Admiral Sabin's Amphibious Evacuation Force, TF 76, brought 15,627 civilians and 11,120 military men as well as 8,630 tons of equipment, 166 artillery pieces, and 128 vehicles out of the Tachens to Taiwan while the carriers of TF 77 and the gun ships of TF 75 stood guard.

For almost another decade, Washburn continued alternating western Pacific deployments of varying length with normal operations along the West Coast. Periodically, crises occurred and took her to some of the world's trouble spots. In January 1962, she showed up at Nationalist Chinese-held offshore islands once again in support of naval forces sent there as a show of force in response to communist Chinese shelling of Quemoy and Matsu islands. By the following fall, she found herself halfway around the world in the West Indies supporting the Navy's quarantine of Cuba called by President Kennedy to rid that island of offensive Russian missiles. Otherwise, the decade between 1955 and 1965 proved relatively normal, made up of the usual resupply voyages, amphibious and fleet exercises, port visits, and ever-recurring overhauls.

=== Vietnam War, 1964–1970 ===
Near the end of 1964, however, the attack cargo ship entered a geographic region that dominated her western Pacific deployments for the remainder of her career — South Vietnam. In December of that year, she began hauling supplies and equipment there for use by the South Vietnamese government in its struggle with the Vietcong insurgents. Thereafter, she cruised off the coast with Marines embarked as part of a contingency force. That duty lasted until 8 March 1965 when she landed troops near Da Nang. She returned to amphibious operations in mid-April, landing reinforcements for the defense of Da Nang Air Base and Phu Bai Combat Base and again early in May when three battalion landing teams (BLT's) and a mobile construction battalion went ashore near Chu Lai to extend the perimeter and construct Chu Lai Air Base. She departed the South Vietnamese coast at the end of May for more routine 7th Fleet duties but returned for one more brief tour of duty in the combat zone before heading home early in September.

Almost a year later, in August 1966, the ship returned to the Far East and, late in September, to Vietnamese waters. Her duty again consisted of transporting troops and supplies to, from, and between points in Vietnam. Each month, from September 1966 to February 1967, brought duty off the coast of Vietnam. Between each tour in the combat zone, she visited ports elsewhere in the Orient, calling frequently at places in Japan, on Okinawa, and in the Philippines.

Early in February 1967, she completed her last mission in the combat zone and headed home. Steaming via Okinawa and Yokosuka, Japan, she arrived in San Diego on 15 March. She conducted normal operations until the end of July when she entered the Todd Shipyard at Seattle, Washington, for a three-month overhaul. Washburn returned to San Diego on 2 November and began refresher training on the 20th.

Early in 1968, she headed back to the Far East and, by late February, returned to the coast of Vietnam. During her 1968 deployment, Washburn spent four extended tours of duty off Vietnam again carrying troops and supplies to and from operational areas throughout the southern half of the country.

That fall, she resumed normal operations out of San Diego; but, late the following spring, she headed back to the western Pacific. From May to October, the ship cruised the coast of Vietnam, departing periodically to transport Marines to Okinawa, to make liberty calls at various ports in the Far East, and to replenish in Japan and in the Philippines. She finished the last of four tours in the combat zone on 3 October and, after stopping at Okinawa to participate in an amphibious exercise, headed back to the United States on 9 October.

She arrived in San Diego on 26 October and resumed local operations. Washburn was reclassified as an amphibious cargo ship and redesignated LKA-108 on 1 January 1969. Her employment continued until 16 May 1970 at which time she was decommissioned.

=== Decommissioning and fate ===
Soon thereafter, Washburn was placed in the National Defense Reserve Fleet at Suisun Bay, California. On 1 September 1971, she was transferred permanently to the custody of the Maritime Administration. On 1 October 1976, Washburn's name was struck from the Navy List, and she was sold for scrapping in December 1979. A large scale model of the ship is in the U.S. Navy Museum in Washington, DC.

== Awards ==
Washburn earned five battle stars during the Korean War and six battle stars for Vietnam service.
