= USS Diamond Head =

Ammunition ship of the United States Navy

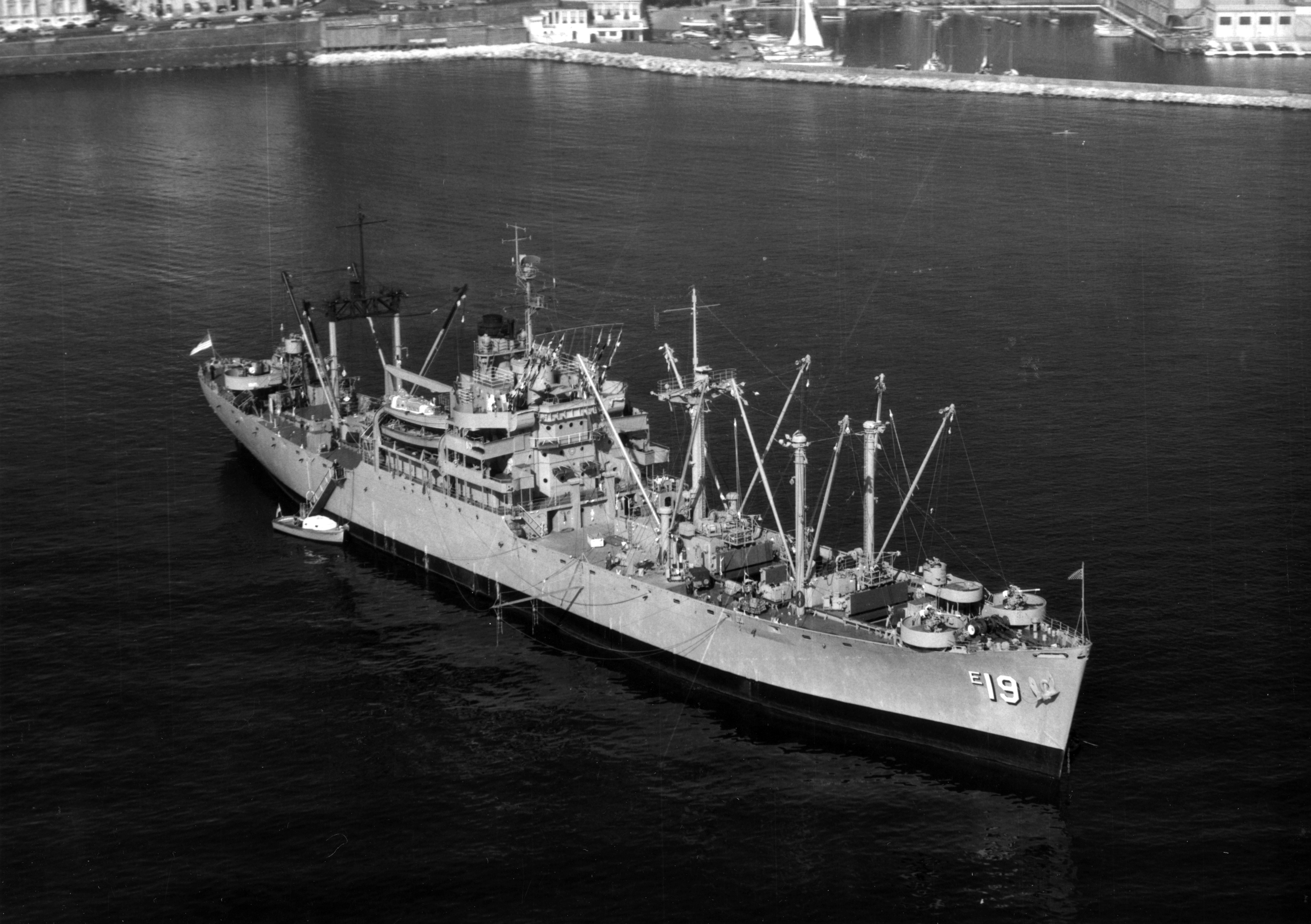

History

United States
- Name: USS Diamond Head
- Namesake: Diamond Head, a volcano in Hawaii
- Launched: 3 February 1945
- Acquired: 10 March 1945
- Commissioned: 9 August 1945
- Recommissioned: 9 August 1951
- Decommissioned: 23 August 1946
- Out of service: 1 March 1973
- Stricken: 1 March 1973
- Fate: Sold for scrapping, 3 October 1974

General characteristics
- Length: 459 ft 2 in (140 m)
- Beam: 63 ft (19.2 m)
- Draft: 28 ft 3 in (8.6 m)
- Propulsion: Geared turbine; 1 × shaft; 6,000 shp (4.5 MW)
- Speed: 16 knots (30 km/h)
- Capacity: 7,700 long tons (7,800 t) deadweight
- Complement: 267 officers and enlisted

USS Diamond Head (AE-19) was a Mount Hood-class ammunition ship in service with the United States Navy in 1945-1946 and from 1951 to 1973. She was sold for scrapping in 1974.

== History ==
USS Diamond Head was launched on 3 February 1945, the ship was built by the North Carolina Shipbuilding Co., Wilmington, North Carolina under a Maritime Commission contract, and sponsored by Mrs. D. Bill. Transferred to the U.S. Navy on 10 March 1945, and converted at Bethlehem Key Highway Shipyard, Baltimore, Maryland to carry and transfer naval ammunition, the ship was commissioned on 9 August 1945, under the command of Lieutenant Commander F. C. Snow, USNR.

On 20 September 1945, Diamond Head reported for duty to Norfolk Commander, Service Force, Atlantic. After crew training, the Bureau of Ships used the Diamond Head experimentally to test suitable exterior markings for hospital ships. She departed Norfolk on 5 April 1946, for Galveston, Texas, arriving five days later. Diamond Head was placed out of commission and into the reserve fleet on 23 August 1946.

Diamond Head was recommissioned on 9 August 1951, as part of the naval expansion brought about by the Korean War. Assigned to the U.S. Atlantic Fleet, the ammunition ship took her place as part of the vital logistics support force that has given the United States Navy outstanding sea-keeping ability and unprecedented mobility. Diamond Head served in various operations along the east coast and in the Caribbean, and through 1960 had made five cruises with the 6th Fleet in the Mediterranean.

In March 1961, Diamond Head was deployed to the Caribbean in support of the Bay of Pigs invasion. On 27 April 1961, Diamond Head collided with the USS Independence, causing a fire in the ship's forecastle, flooding the forward magazine, and tearing a hole in the hull above the waterline. Diamond Head sailed to Guantanamo Bay for repairs, while the Independence was not damaged.

On 16 March 1967, Diamond Head left Norfolk, Virginia, for a nine-month deployment off Vietnam. She transited the Panama Canal on 22 March, arriving at Pearl Harbor on 5 April 1967. She arrived in Subic Bay, Philippines on 22 April. From May through October, the crew rearmed almost 200 ships, transferring almost 12,000 tonnes (26,000,000 lb) of ammunition. The ship also visited Manila; Hong Kong; Sasebo, Japan; Pearl Harbor; San Diego; and Panama City for much appreciated Rest & Recreation. Diamond Head arrived in Norfolk on 19 December 1967.

The ship was decommissioned and struck from the Naval Vessel Register on 1 March 1973 and sold for scrapping in 1974. The ship's bell is located in Liberty, Mississippi.
