= USS Duplin =

US Navy attack cargo ship

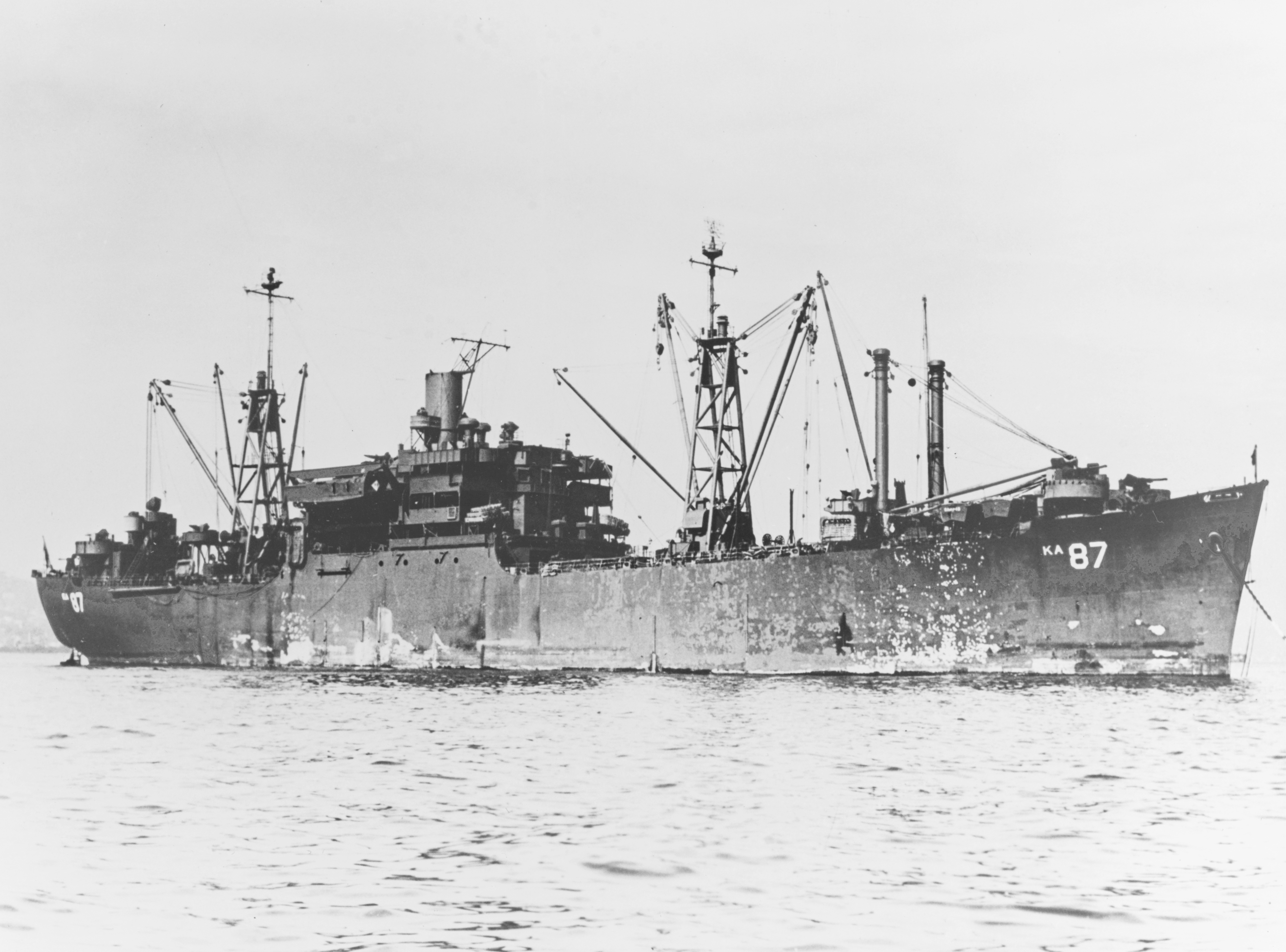

History

United States
- Name: USS Duplin
- Namesake: Duplin County, North Carolina
- Builder: North Carolina Shipbuilding Company, Wilmington, North Carolina
- Laid down: 18 August 1944
- Launched: 17 October 1944
- Acquired: 30 October 1944
- Commissioned: 15 May 1945
- Decommissioned: 21 May 1946
- Renamed: SS Kathryn; SS Dearborn; SS Rio Grande
- Stricken: 5 June 1946
- Fate: Sold into merchant service, 1946; Scrapped in 1971

General characteristics
- Class & type: Tolland-class attack cargo ship
- Displacement: 6,350 long tons (6,452 t)
- Length: 459 ft 2 in (139.95 m)
- Beam: 63 ft (19 m)
- Draft: 26 ft 4 in (8.03 m)
- Propulsion: GE geared turbine drive; Single propeller; 6,000 shp (4.5 MW)
- Speed: 16 knots (30 km/h; 18 mph)
- Complement: 429
- Armament: 1 × 5"/38 caliber gun; 4 × twin 40 mm guns; 16 × 20 mm guns

USS Duplin (AKA-87) was a Tolland-class attack cargo ship of the United States Navy, in service from 1945 to 1946. She was sold into merchant service in 1946 and finally scrapped in 1971.

== History ==
USS Duplin was named after Duplin County, North Carolina. Like all AKAs, Duplin was designed to carry military cargo and landing craft, and to use the latter to land weapons, supplies, and Marines on enemy shores during amphibious operations. She served as a commissioned ship for 12 months.

The ship was laid down as a Type C2-S-AJ3 ship under a Maritime Commission contract (MC hull 1401) on 18 August 1944 at Wilmington, North Carolina by the North Carolina Shipbuilding Co. and launched on 17 October 1944, sponsored by Miss Mary Jennette. Acquired by the Navy on 30 October 1944, the ship was placed in service the same day, and taken in tow by the tug Race Point on 7 November 1944 for the voyage to Bethlehem Steel Co., Key Highway Plant, Baltimore, Maryland, for conversion. She departed for Norfolk, Virginia, on 16 December 1944 and arrived the next day, placed out of service on 18 December 1944; and commissioned at the Norfolk Navy Yard on 15 May 1945.

=== World War II, 1945 ===
Following commissioning, Duplin reported for shakedown on 27 May 1945, and completed that training on 6 June. Assigned to the Naval Transportation Service (NTS), the new attack cargo ship departed Hampton Roads on 12 June 1945 for Marseille, France, arriving at her destination on 24 June 1945 to embark Army troops and cargo earmarked for the Pacific, German prisoners of war providing the necessary labor. Duplin sailed from Marseille on 9 July. Transiting the Panama Canal between 24 and 26 July, the ship reported to the Commander-in-Chief, Pacific Fleet, for duty on the latter date. She then proceeded on to Manila, and during her passage westward, in mid-August, the war in the Pacific ended.

=== Post-war activities, 1945–1946 ===
She reached her destination on 23 August, unloading cargo and discharging her passengers within 24 hours. Shifting to Aringay, Lingayen Gulf, the ship began embarking troops of the U.S. Army's 33rd Division on 5 September, and sailed in convoy on 20 September for Wakayama, Honshu. Arriving off her destination on 27 September, she disembarked her troops and discharged cargo soon thereafter. Returning to the Philippines, the attack cargo ship arrived at Tolomo, Mindanao, on 10 October, part of her passage having been enlivened by heavy seas. She made a similar voyage to land troops of the 24th Division, embarking them beginning on 15 October and putting them ashore at Matsuyama, Shikoku, on 22 October. "Stevedoring was performed industriously by Japanese prisoners," an observer in Duplin later wrote, "who were amazed at the efficient cargo handling of the American Blue Jackets..."

Following completion of that occupation troop lift, Duplin proceeded to Mitsugahama Roads to await further assignments; assigned thence to Commander, Western Sea Frontier, the ship embarked homeward-bound officers and men in the Matsuyama area, then sailed for Nagoya on 6 November 1945, arriving the following day. Embarking another large contingent of U.S.-bound men, the attack cargo vessel sailed for San Francisco, California, on 9 November. Re-routed to Seattle, Washington, during the return trip, Duplin reached Port Townsend, Washington, as part of the "Magic Carpet" operation on 20 November, "safely and expeditiously delivering happy personnel to the welcome shore of their beloved United States of America."

Dropping down the west coast to San Francisco, arriving on 12 December 1945, Duplin loaded cargo for occupation forces in Japan, and sailed three days after Christmas (28 December 1945) on her final run to the Far East. Touching at Sasebo (15–24 January 1946) and Yokosuka (26 January – 7 February). Returning to San Francisco on 20 February, she loaded cargo (including eight LCM-3 landing craft), and ultimately departed Oakland, California, on 6 March for the east coast. During her passage Norfolk-ward, she embarked a USO troupe in the Canal Zone (14–18 March).

=== Decommissioning and sale ===
Ultimately making port at Norfolk on 26 March, Duplin was decommissioned on 21 May 1946 and re-delivered to the Maritime Commission the following day at Lee Hall, Virginia, on 22 May, and transferred to the War Shipping Administration on 23 May 1946 for disposal. She was struck from the Naval Vessel Register on 5 June 1946.

Renamed SS Kathryn, the former attack cargo ship operated under the house flag of A.H. Bull Steamship Company out of New York until 18 September 1962. On that day she was sold in a US Marshal's asset sale to National Maritime Leasing Co. On 11 April 1963 the Dearborn Shipping Company purchased the former AKA and renamed her SS Dearborn. Sold and renamed a third time, to SS Rio Grande on 18 September 1963 by her new owners Rio Grande Transport, Inc. she served for a little over a year until being returned to the Maritime Administration. MARAD operated the ship as a charter carrier until 28 September 1967 when she was once again laid up in the reserve fleet. Deemed as surplus to needs, she was ultimately scrapped in January 1971 by American Ship Dismantlers.
