= USS Vesuvius (AE-15) =

Ammunition ship of the United States Navy

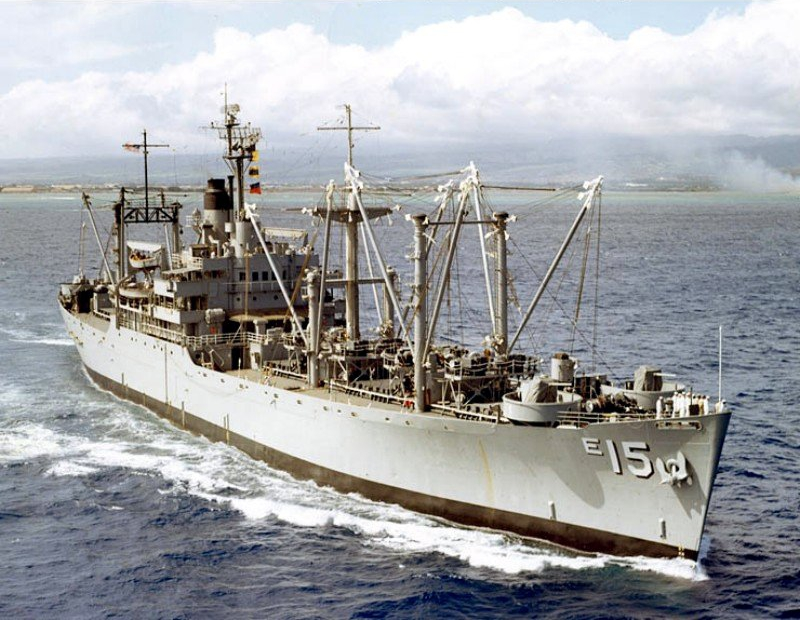
- USS Vesuvius (AE-15) underway off Hawaii in 1963

History

United States
- Name: USS Vesuvius (AE-15)
- Namesake: Mount Vesuvius
- Launched: 26 May 1944
- Commissioned: 16 January 1945
- Decommissioned: 20 April 1946
- Recommissioned: 15 November 1951
- Decommissioned: 14 August 1973
- Stricken: 14 August 1973
- Honors and awards: 2 battle stars (World War II); 2 battle stars (Korea); 10 battle stars (Vietnam)
- Fate: Scrapped, 1974
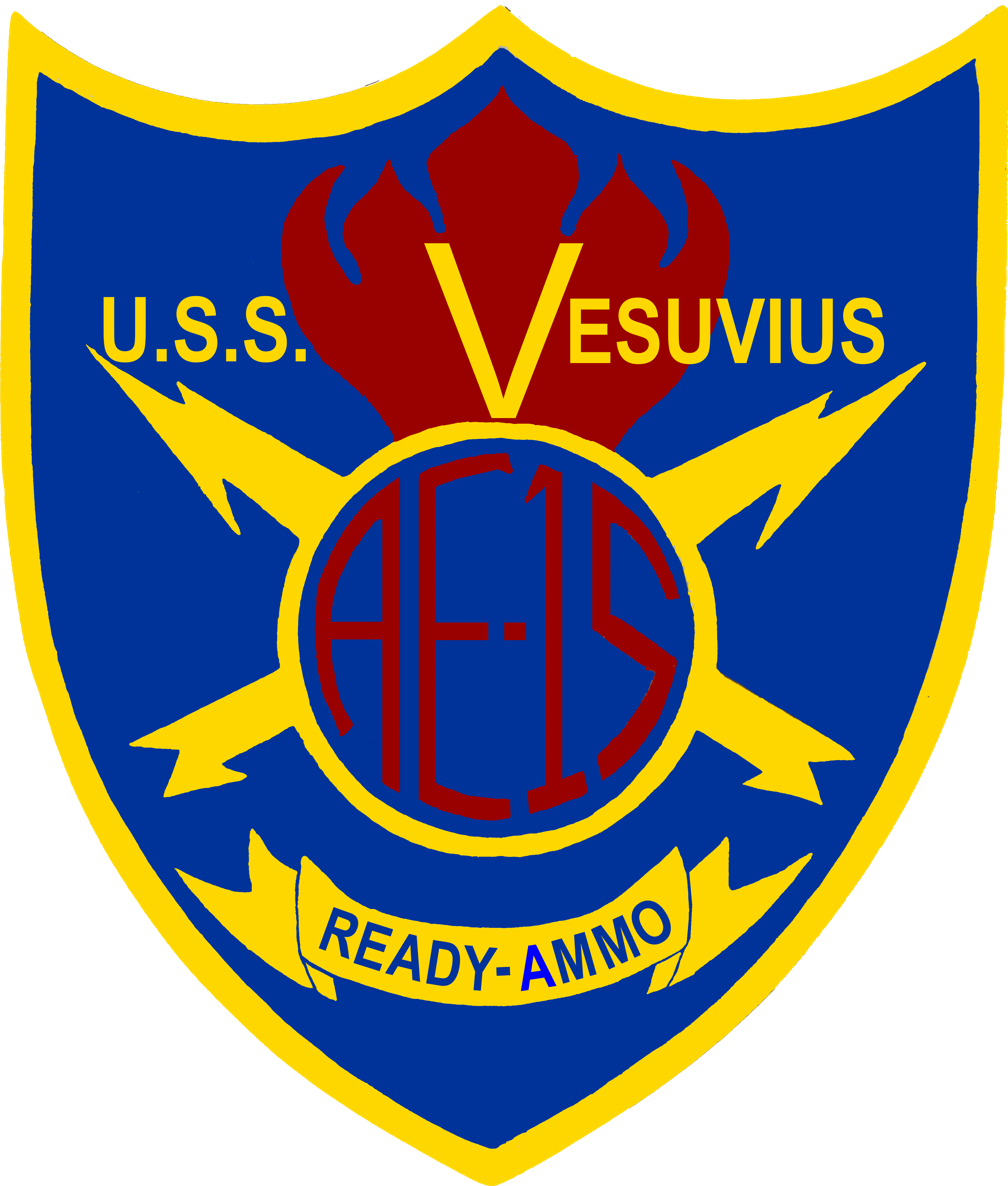
- Badge

General characteristics
- Length: 459 ft 2 in (140 m)
- Beam: 63 ft (19.2 m)
- Draft: 28 ft 3 in (8.6 m)
- Propulsion: Geared turbine; 1 × shaft; 6,000 shp (4.5 MW)
- Speed: 16 knots (30 km/h)
- Capacity: 7,700 long tons (7,800 t) deadweight
- Complement: 267 officers and enlisted
- Armament: 4 × 3"/50 caliber guns

The fourth USS Vesuvius (AE-15) was laid down under a Maritime Commission contract (MC hull 1381) by the North Carolina Shipbuilding Company, Wilmington, N.C.; launched on 26 May 1944; acquired by the United States Navy on 4 July 1944; and commissioned on 16 January 1945.

== Service history ==
=== World War II, 1945–1946 ===
The ship underwent builder's trials out of Brooklyn, New York, and then began shakedown out of Hampton Roads, Virginia, in Chesapeake Bay. On 17 February, she sailed to Earle, New Jersey, to load ammunition. She then headed for the island of Ulithi, via the Panama Canal, on 5 March. She reached her destination on 5 April and promptly unloaded and took on more cargo. Vesuvius departed for Okinawa on 10 April where she became part of Service Squadron 6. In this role, she replenished ammunition to the Fleet in the waters around Okinawa. In July 1945, Vesuvius joined a rearming group off Honshū, Japan, to support raids on Japan by the 3rd Fleet. She detached on 2 August and set sail for Leyte Gulf, Philippines. While there, word of the Japanese capitulation was received on 15 August 1945. The ship remained in the Philippines until 28 October, when she left for the United States.

After transiting the Panama Canal, Vesuvius joined the Service Force, Atlantic Fleet. The ship arrived at Yorktown, Virginia, on 14 December 1945. Vesuvius departed Yorktown on 10 January 1946, bound for Leonardo, N.J., to discharge her cargo and ship's ammunition to the Naval Ammunition Depot. On 7 February, she headed for Orange, Texas, arriving there on 13 February to commence her pre-inactivation overhaul. Vesuvius was placed out of commission, in reserve, at Orange on 20 August 1946.

=== Korean War, 1951–1952 ===
In response to the needs imposed by the Korean War, Vesuvius was recommissioned on 15 November 1951. She remained at Orange and Beaumont, Texas, for outfitting and readying for sea until 7 January 1952, when she departed for San Diego. Having arrived on 14 February, the ship conducted exercises and loaded ammunition at Port Chicago, California, before sailing on 22 March for Sasebo, Japan. She arrived at Sasebo on 3 May 1952 and, after voyage repairs, began supplying ammunition to the ships of Task Force (TF) 77 on patrol off the east coast of Korea. On 1 December, Vesuvius headed for the United States, arriving at San Francisco on 18 December for overhaul.

=== Pacific Fleet, 1953–1967 ===
Over the next decade, Vesuvius was to make 11 more extended deployments to the western Pacific where she serviced units of the 7th Fleet. These operations were interspersed with port visits to Japan, Okinawa, Taiwan, the Philippines, and Hong Kong. Periods on the west coast of the United States were spent in overhaul and in the conduct of underway training.

On 24 June 1963, Vesuvius commenced her 13th post-World War II deployment to the western Pacific, making stops at Pearl Harbor and at Guam for repairs and arriving at Yokosuka on 4 August. She serviced the 7th Fleet throughout August. In October, she visited Sasebo and Kagoshima, Japan; Subic Bay, Philippines; and Buckner Bay, Okinawa. In November, she visited Hong Kong and spent the entire month of December 1963 in and out of Yokosuka, Japan. She also visited Beppu, and Komatsushima, Japan. (1st American Navy ship to visit since end of World War II).

Vesuvius began 1964 in Yokosuka making final preparations for her homeward passage. On 7 January, she got underway for San Francisco via the great circle route. She arrived on 31 January and spent February and March moored to the pier at Port Chicago. A brief trip to San Diego and participation in an exercise with other units of the 1st Fleet occupied April, and Vesuvius spent May in an upkeep status at Concord, California. On 6 July, she was underway for coastal operations. August and September saw the ship in and out of port, training and providing services to the Fleet Training Group. In October, she participated in operations with members of the 1st Fleet. On 20 November 1964, Vesuvius returned to Concord for upkeep and a holiday leave period. She got underway on 18 December for the Mare Island Annex, where she spent the holiday season.

=== Vietnam, 1965–1972 ===
The ship made a brief trip to San Diego beginning on 4 January 1965 before returning to Concord on 13 January. She began reloading cargo in preparation for deployment and got underway for the Far East on 1 February. Vesuvius reached Subic Bay, via Pearl Harbor and Guam, on 28 February. She then began operations in the South China Sea interrupted by brief returns for the onload of cargo in Subic Bay. In July 1965, she received a respite from her duties in Hong Kong. After a week there, she resumed operations. Having made 182 underway replenishments during the deployment, Vesuvius returned to Concord, California, on 28 November.

Vesuvius began the year 1966 by steaming on 3 January to the Puget Sound Naval Shipyard at Bremerton, Washington, to undergo repairs for six weeks. After leaving Bremerton, the ship headed south to Concord to onload ammunition. On 5 March, she sailed for San Diego for refresher training. Shortly after arrival, a 26-inch crack in one of her hull plates was discovered. She promptly began transferring her load of ammunition to other ships. By 26 March, the ammunition had been successfully offloaded; and, on 28 April 1966, Vesuvius proceeded to the Bethlehem Steel Shipyard in San Francisco. On 14 May, Vesuvius deployed for the western Pacific. From 13 June through 27 November 1966, Vesuvius conducted replenishment operations between the Philippines and the South China Sea. In December, she stopped at Pearl Harbor on her way home, where an unusual cargo was embarked — $9,700,000 was brought on board for a special currency lift back to the United States. Shortly before Christmas, Vesuvius reached Concord.

The year 1967 found the ship berthed at Mare Island preparing to undergo her first major overhaul since 1962. Following completion of overhaul at the Mare Island Naval Shipyard and underway training, Vesuvius departed for the western Pacific on 15 July 1967, bound for Subic Bay. Except for brief periods in Hong Kong, Vesuvius came off the line in the South China Sea only long enough to fill her hold with more ammunition.

Near the end of January 1968, Vesuvius sailed to Yokosuka on her return trip to the United States, only to be recalled to the seas off Vietnam following the Pueblo Incident to support Operation Formation Star. Vesuvius finally returned to the San Francisco Bay area on 17 March 1968, offloaded, proceeded to the Naval Shipyard at Mare Island and, on 4 April, entered the Triple A Shipyard in San Francisco for extensive repairs and upkeep. Repairs were completed on 10 May, and the ship began refresher training in June. Following inspections and loadout, Vesuvius deployed again on 31 July 1968. She reached Subic Bay on 20 August for receipt of ammunition, then began operations in the Vietnam area. She remained on line through 3 December, when she left for a period of rest and recreation in Hong Kong. She departed there on 10 December to return to Vietnam.

Vesuvius remained on line through January and February 1969. In late February, she sailed into Bangkok, Thailand. From Bangkok, the ship went to Subic Bay to commence her final loadout before heading home. After a brief stop in Hawaii, Vesuvius arrived in Concord on 1 April 1969. In late April, the ship underwent six weeks of restricted availability at a commercial yard in San Francisco. Late in June, she steamed for San Diego and refresher training and exercises. By 23 July, she had returned to San Francisco and began three weeks of loadout for yet another deployment. Vesuvius departed for the western Pacific on 17 September 1969. After stopovers in Pearl Harbor and Yokosuka, she touched at Subic Bay for a few days before starting her line period off Vietnam.

During this deployment, Vesuvius conducted seven line runs in the South China Sea and the Tonkin Gulf in support of 7th Fleet operations. On 25 April, she left for home with stops at Kobe, Japan, and Pearl Harbor. She arrived at Concord on 23 May 1970. The ship entered a three-month upkeep in San Francisco from July to October followed by a pre-deployment inspection. On 9 November, Vesuvius departed the San Francisco area for intensive training in San Diego and, on 6 December, steamed back to Port Chicago for a holiday leave period.

Vesuvius again departed for the western Pacific on 4 January 1971. She arrived at Subic Bay on 25 January, and, one week later, was underway for her first line run of the deployment. On 20 February, she pulled into Singapore and then proceeded shortly thereafter to the Philippines for a 15-day upkeep period. Vesuvius then resumed her assignment of providing ammunition logistics support to the 7th Fleet and Royal Australian Navy units off the coast of Vietnam. On 2 August 1971, Vesuvius left Subic Bay for San Francisco, arriving on 1 September. After offloading ammunition at Concord, the ship moved to the Mare Island Naval Shipyard for a month of stand-down. On 4 October, she entered a six-week upkeep. Upon completion, she returned to Concord on 19 November. Vesuvius departed Concord on 29 November for refresher training off San Diego, returning to Mare Island on 4 December.

Vesuvius got underway on 3 January 1972 and, on 5 January, commenced refresher training in San Diego. She returned to Concord on 29 January. Preparations for deployment began immediately, and the ship left California on 14 February. Upon arrival at Subic Bay, Vesuvius again supported combat operations for the 7th Fleet. On 29 June, she began upkeep and returned to action on 18 July. Her duties were interrupted for short trips to Hong Kong and Bangkok in August and October. In December, she entered drydock at Subic Bay to replace her propeller, but she promptly returned to Vietnam and ended the year in the combat zone.

=== Decommissioning, 1973 ===
The ship returned to Concord on 3 March 1973. After offloading ammunition, the ship moved to Mare Island. The ship was scheduled for upkeep from April to July. However, a message was received from the Chief of Naval Operations in July to prepare the ship for decommissioning. On 14 August 1973, Vesuvius was decommissioned and transferred to the Inactive Ship Maintenance Facility at Mare Island for further disposition and was struck from the Navy List. Vesuvius was reported to have been used for target practice, shortly after decommissioning.

== Awards ==
Vesuvius received two battle stars for World War II, two battle stars for the Korean War, and 10 battle stars for her service in Vietnam.
