= USS Mount Olympus =

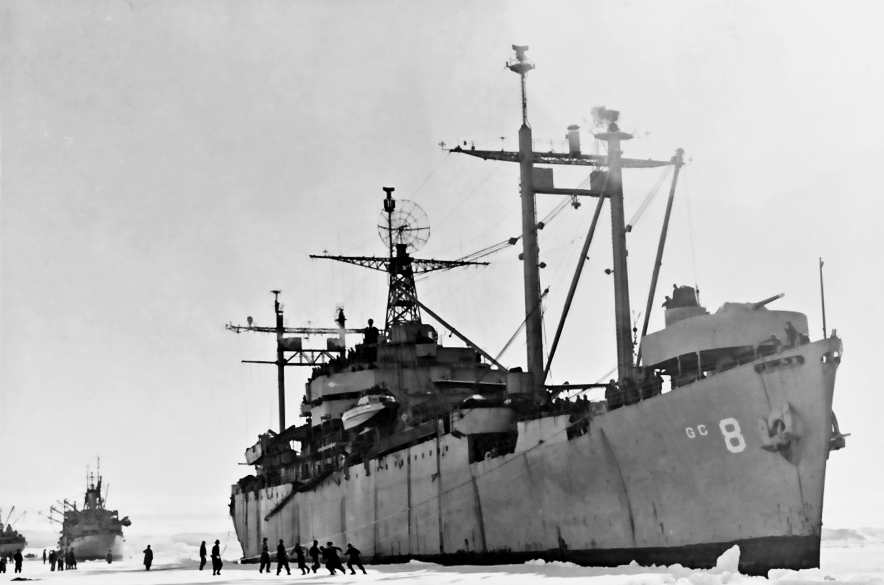
- USS Mount Olympus moored in Antarctica, 1946-47

History

United States
- Name: USS Mount Olympus
- Namesake: Mount Olympus in Washington
- Builder: North Carolina Shipbuilding Company
- Laid down: 3 August 1943
- Launched: 3 October 1943
- Commissioned: 24 May 1944
- Decommissioned: 4 April 1956
- Stricken: 1 June 1961
- Fate: Scrapped in 1973

General characteristics
- Class & type: Mount McKinley-class command ship
- Displacement: 12,142 tons
- Length: 459 ft 2 in (140 m)
- Beam: 63 ft (19.2 m)
- Draft: 25 ft (7.6 m)
- Speed: 15 knots
- Complement: 729
- Armament: 2 × 5 in (130 mm)/38 cal guns (2 × 1); 8 × 40 mm guns (4 × 2); 20 × 20 mm guns (20 × 1)

USS Mount Olympus (AGC-8) was a Mount McKinley-class amphibious force command ship, named for the highest peak in the Olympic Mountains of the State of Washington. She was designed to be an amphibious forces flagship—a floating command post with advanced communications equipment and extensive combat information spaces to be used by the amphibious forces commander and landing force commander during large-scale operations.

== World War II ==
Mount Olympus was laid down on 3 August 1943 at the North Carolina Shipbuilding Company in Wilmington, North Carolina. She was launched on 3 October 1943 as the USS Eclipse, a transport ship, sponsored by Mrs. W. C. Park, and then renamed Mount Olympus on 27 December 1943. She was commissioned at Boston, Massachusetts, after her conversion on 24 May 1944.

Mount Olympus departed from the East Coast in early July, arriving at Hawaii via the Panama Canal on 23 July. With the Commander, 3rd Amphibious Force, embarked, she was underway from Hawaii on 29 August. She arrived Leyte Gulf 20 October, there to serve as the floating headquarters for the huge U.S. Army invasion force. The landing force was subjected to continual air attacks, but its survival was assured by the American naval victory in the Battle of Leyte Gulf, which destroyed the Japanese Navy as an effective combat force.

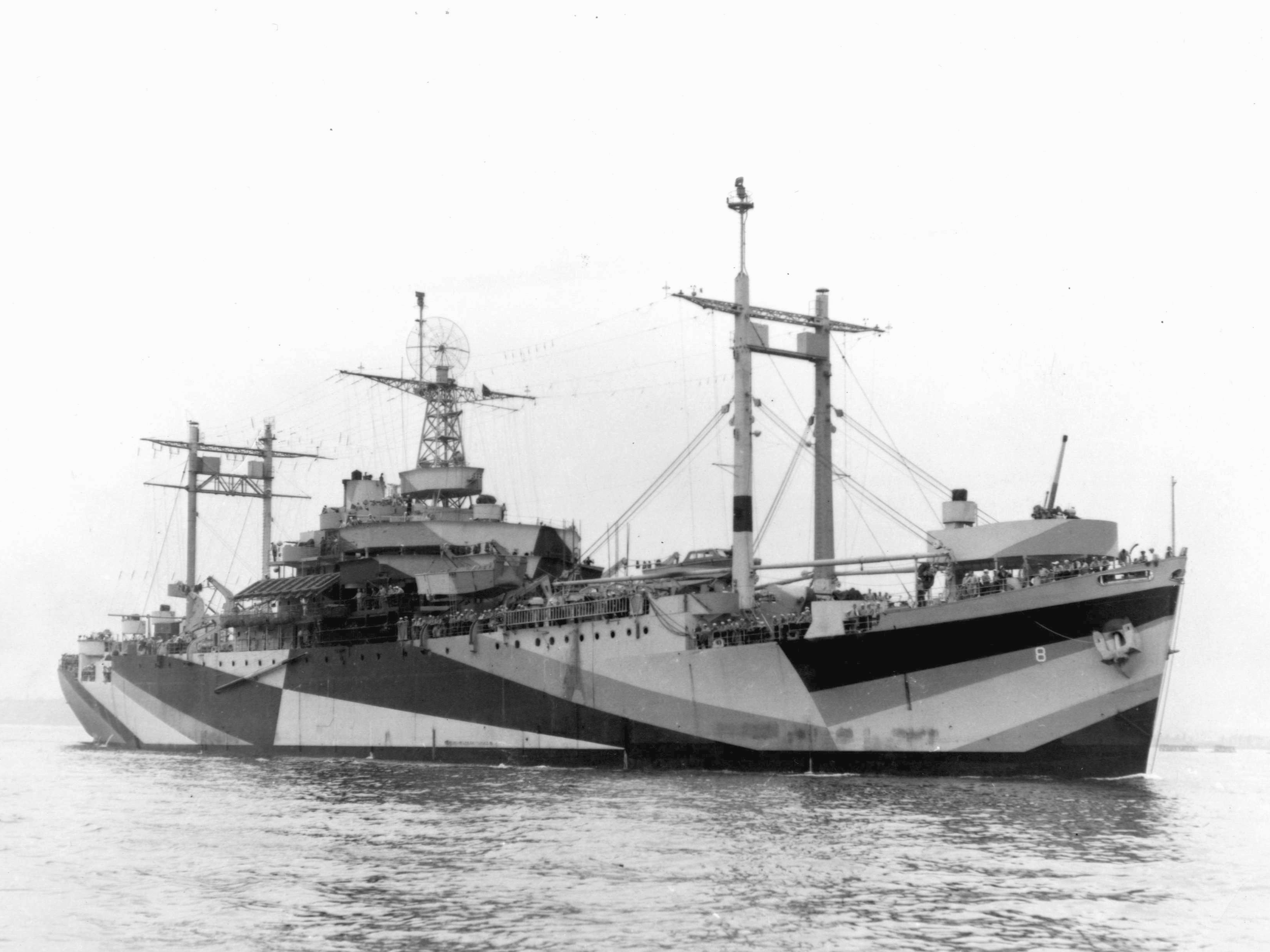
Mount Olympus in June 1944, displaying dazzle camouflage.

On 26 October 1944, Mount Olympus departed for Hollandia, New Guinea, via Peleliu Island, in preparation for the next assault on the Japanese-occupied Philippines. After invasion rehearsals at Huon Gulf, New Guinea, the ship departed Manus Island, Admiralties, on 31 December for the assault on Lingayen Gulf on 9 January 1945. After the initial assault and with the ground force commander disembarked, Mount Olympus was soon underway on 11 January from Lingayen Gulf. She called at Ulithi Atoll to allow the Commander, 3rd Amphibious Force, to disembark and travel by plane to Hawaii, while she herself sailed for an overhaul at San Francisco Bay, arriving on 11 February and leaving on 22 April for Pearl Harbor and Guam.

Arriving at Guam on 6 July 1945, Mount Olympus sailed on for Manila Bay, colliding with the oiler Millicoma along the way. The ship was escorted to San Pedro Bay on the Leyte Gulf, for repairs by the heavy repair ship Ajax (AR-6). Then she continued to Manila, arriving on 3 August. After the close of hostilities in August 1945, Mount Olympus arrived at Tokyo Bay on 2 September with part of the U.S. 1st Cavalry Division. After months of moving occupation troops from the Philippines and other bases to ports in Japan and China, she left Shanghai on 28 May 1946, bound for San Diego, the Panama Canal, and New York Harbor, arriving on 7 July 1946.

== Postwar ==
In September, Mount Olympus was made the flagship for Operation Highjump, the U.S. Navy's Antarctic Expedition. The ship sailed from Naval Station Norfolk on 2 December, passed through the Panama Canal to rendezvous with the Pacific group, and with it she reached the Bay of Whales, New Zealand on 16 January 1947. Mount Olympus was detached from the group on 11 February, and she returned to Norfolk on 17 April to become the flagship of Commander, Amphibious Group 2, in training along the East Coast of the United States and in the Caribbean Sea. She became flagship and temporary headquarters for CINCNELM/CINCSOUTH in the Mediterranean Sea on 21 June 1951.

Mount Olympus was relieved by the USS Adirondack (AGC-15) in August 1951, and she returned to Norfork and duty with the Amphibious Group 2, joining in NATO naval exercises Operation Mainbrace and Longs in Northern Europe and the Mediterranean from August through December 1952.

After an overhaul in Norfolk from December to March 1953, when her helicopter deck was also installed, she served in the U.S. Atlantic Fleet until 5 January 1955, when she sailed for the Panama Canal and San Diego, California, arriving on 23 January 1955.

Having participated in exercise Surfboard with the 38th Infantry Regiment from Washington State off the coast of San Simeon, California in mid-March, Mount Olympus proceeded to Arctic waters as part of Project 572 in support of the Distant Early Warning Line. While underway from Point Barrow, Alaska to Point Hope, she became icebound, but was freed by the icebreaker Burton Island. Having sustained damage to structural bulkheads from the ice pressure, the ship was repaired by Current in Point Hope. Mount Olympus returned to San Diego on 29 September and on 31 October 1955, she proceeded to Mare Island Naval Shipyard for deactivation.

== Decommissioning ==
Mount Olympus was decommissioned on 4 April 1956, and she was struck from the Navy list on 1 June 1961. The ship was transferred to the Maritime Administration in June 1966, and she remained in the National Defense Reserve Fleet in Suisun Bay, California. She was sold and sent to the scrapyard in 1973.

Mount Olympus received two battle stars for her service in World War II.
