= USS Adirondack (AGC-15) =

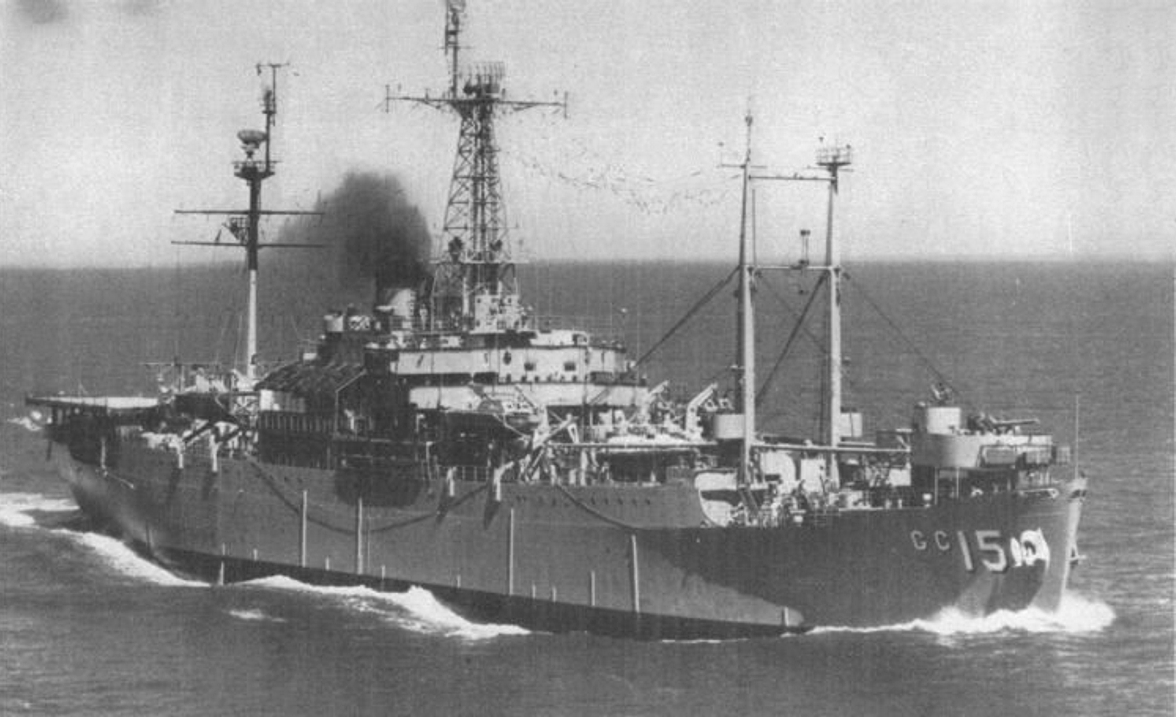
- USS Adirondack

History

United States
- Name: USS Adirondack
- Namesake: Adirondack Mountains
- Builder: North Carolina Shipbuilding Company, Wilmington, North Carolina
- Laid down: 18 November 1944
- Launched: 13 January 1945
- Commissioned: 2 September 1945
- Decommissioned: 9 November 1955
- Stricken: 1 June 1961
- Fate: Sold for scrap, 7 November 1972

General characteristics
- Class & type: Adirondack-class command ship
- Displacement: 7,240 long tons (7,356 t) light; 13,910 long tons (14,133 t) full load
- Length: 459 ft 2 in (139.95 m)
- Beam: 63 ft (19 m)
- Draft: 24 ft (7.3 m)
- Propulsion: Geared turbine, 1 shaft, 6,000 shp (4,474 kW)
- Speed: 16 knots (30 km/h; 18 mph)
- Complement: 633 officers and enlisted
- Armament: 2 × 5"/38 caliber guns; 3 × twin 40 mm AA guns; 6 × single 20 mm AA guns

The third USS Adirondack (AGC-15) was laid down on 18 November 1944 under a Maritime Commission contract by the North Carolina Shipbuilding Company in Wilmington, North Carolina; launched on 13 January 1945, sponsored by Mrs. E. L. White; transferred to the Navy on 4 February 1945; towed to the Philadelphia Naval Shipyard for conversion; and commissioned on 2 September 1945, the day Japan surrendered on board the battleship Missouri (BB-63) in Tokyo Bay.

== Service history ==
=== 1945–1950 ===
The ship was designed as an amphibious force flagship, a floating command post with advanced communications equipment and extensive combat information spaces to be used by the amphibious forces commander and landing force commander during large-scale operations. After shakedown training in the Chesapeake Bay from 25 September to 12 October 1945, Adirondack assumed the duties of flagship for Commander, Operational Development Force (CTF 69), and operated out of Norfolk until August 1949, when she was scheduled to participate in an Antarctic expedition. However, that project was cancelled, and Adirondack reported to the Philadelphia Naval Shipyard for inactivation. On 1 February 1950, she was placed in reserve, in service, as flagship of the Philadelphia Group, Atlantic Reserve Fleet.

=== 1951–1953 ===
Over a year later, the command ship returned to the active fleet. Following a recommissioning ceremony in Philadelphia on 4 April 1951, Adirondack reported to the Atlantic Fleet Training Command in Norfolk, Virginia, for inspection and training. She returned to Philadelphia on 3 June to complete final preparations for a tour in the Mediterranean as flagship for the Commander in Chief, Allied Forces in southern Europe (CINCSOUTH), and for the Commander in Chief, U.S. Naval Forces, Northeastern Atlantic and Mediterranean Fleets (CINCNELM).

Adirondack steamed to the Mediterranean, and on 18 August, moored in Naples, which was to be her home port for almost two years. In addition to her duties as Flagship for CINCSOUTH and CINCNELM, she coordinated activities of units of the 6th Fleet as they arrived and departed and assumed the administrative duties of senior officer present afloat. After 14 June 1952, Adirondack also served as the flagship for Commander, Subordinate Command, Northeastern Atlantic and Mediterranean Fleets, and then for Commander, Fleet Air, Eastern Atlantic and Mediterranean. On 29 May 1953, she departed Naples and returned to the Norfolk Naval Shipyard for overhaul and reassignment.

=== 1954 ===
Following a shakedown and training cruise to Guantanamo Bay, Adirondack headed back to Norfolk, Virginia, and on 28 October, became flagship for Commander, Amphibious Force, Atlantic Fleet. She sailed from Norfolk on 12 February 1954 to conduct a tour of inspection of amphibious bases in the Caribbean area. In a transfer of flags at San Juan, Puerto Rico, on 23 March, Commander Amphibious Group Four (COMPHIBGRU FOUR) shifted his flag to Adirondack. One week later, the amphibious command ship participated in Operation "Sentry Box" held off Vieques, Puerto Rico. The exercise was the first joint Army-Navy exercise in the Atlantic since the fall of 1952 and employed more than 3,000 native Puerto Rican troops of the Army. This rigorous operation touched off a year of Atlantic Fleet exercises in which Adirondack played a major role.

In April COMPHIBGRU FOUR—still embarked in Adirondack – was designated Commander of the umpire group for LANTAGLEX-54, a full-scale amphibious assault on Onslow Beach, North Carolina. The umpire group exercised the participating units, evaluated training, and assessed "damage" inflicted by the "hostile" units. Another exercise, "Packard V," was held in May and consisted of a naval gunfire demonstration in the Chesapeake Bay and a full-scale D-day assault on Onslow Beach, directed from Adirondack by COMPHIBGRU FOUR.

On 20 July, the ship departed Norfolk for Operation Keystone, a combined land, sea, and air maneuver in the Mediterranean involving forces of the countries of the North Atlantic Treaty Organization. Planning conferences were held in Naples, Italy, and the amphibious task force sortied on 30 August with observers from the United Kingdom, France, Italy, Greece, and Turkey embarked in Adirondack. On 4 September, the task force landed more than 1,500 Marines on the beaches at Dikili, Turkey. The flagship arrived back in Norfolk on 27 September and immediately began preparations for the next series of drills.

On 22 October, she departed Norfolk to rendezvous with other ships participating in Operation "NORAMEX" off the coast of Labrador. A battalion of marines landed on the beaches of Hamilton Inlet on 1 November to test amphibious cold weather doctrine and equipment. After a successful drill, Adirondack sailed on 3 November for Bogue Inlet, North Carolina, for a full-scale assault climaxing the amphibious phases of the Atlantic Fleet training cycle for 1954. She returned to Norfolk on 20 November and leave and upkeep.

=== 1955 ===
During 1955, Adirondack served as umpire for "ANGEX II," a naval gunfire exercise held in February off Vieques and Culebra, Puerto Rico. In early March she observed the "TRAEX 11-55" landing off Vieques as part of the umpire group for the atomic defense exercise phase. She remained in port in Norfolk from 9 March to 11 April and headed south for "TRAEX 111-55" off Vieques. She returned to Norfolk for inactivation; was placed out of commission, in reserve, on 9 November 1955; and transferred to the Maritime Administration for berthing with the James River unit of the National Defense Reserve Fleet.

Adirondack was stricken from the Navy list on 1 June 1961 and sold on 7 November 1972 to Union Minerals and Alloys Corporation of New York City for scrap.
