= USS Storm King =

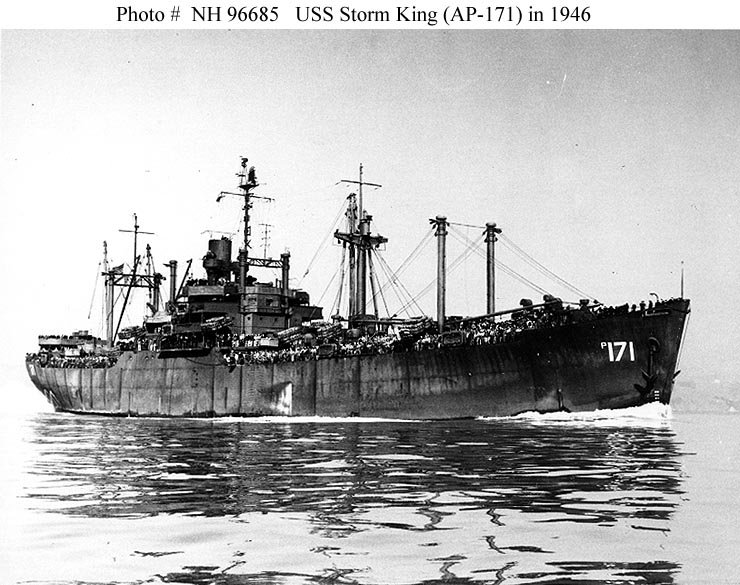
- USS Storm King (AP-171)

History

United States
- Name: USS Storm King
- Namesake: Storm King Mountain
- Builder: North Carolina Shipbuilding Company, Wilmington, North Carolina
- Laid down: 20 July 1943
- Launched: 17 September 1943
- Commissioned: 4 December 1943
- Decommissioned: August 1946
- Stricken: 15 August 1946
- Honors and awards: 4 battle stars (World War II)
- Fate: Sold into merchant service, 1947; Scrapped 1970

General characteristics
- Class & type: Storm King-class transport
- Displacement: 13,910 long tons (14,133 t) full
- Length: 459 ft 2 in (139.95 m)
- Beam: 63 ft (19 m)
- Draft: 23 ft (7.0 m)
- Speed: 16.5 knots (30.6 km/h; 19.0 mph)
- Troops: 1,581
- Complement: 256
- Armament: 1 × 5-inch/38-caliber gun; 4 × 3-inch/50-caliber guns

USS Storm King (AP-171) was a Storm King class auxiliary transport of the United States Navy. She was designed as a troop carrier, and named after Storm King Mountain.

Storm King was laid down under United States Maritime Commission contract (MC hull 1346) on 20 July 1943 by the North Carolina Shipbuilding Company, Wilmington, North Carolina; launched on 17 September 1943; sponsored by Mrs. P. F. Halcey; delivered to the Navy on 3 December 1943, and commissioned on 4 December 1943.

== Service history ==
=== 1944 ===
Storm King moved to Staten Island, New York, on 10 February 1944 where she was converted into a troop transport. She departed New York on 3 March for shakedown out of Hampton Roads, Virginia. The ship was assigned to the Naval Transportation Service on 6 April and loaded troops and cargo. The following week, she sailed for Hawaii. She arrived at Pearl Harbor on 1 May; debarked her troops; and the next day joined Transport Division 26, 5th Amphibious Force.

Storm King spent much of the rest of the month rehearsing amphibious landings in preparation for the invasion of the Marianas. The task force sortied on 29 May, refueled at Eniwetok, and arrived off Saipan early on the morning of 15 June, "D-Day." The transport off-loaded troops of the 23rd Marines, vehicles, and supplies, and began taking casualties on board on the 16th. She was ordered to evacuate them on the 24th and got underway for Eniwetok and Pearl Harbor.

Storm King arrived at Pearl Harbor on 11 July and was assigned to the 3rd Amphibious Force and the conquest of the Palaus. Following rehearsal landings until 12 August, the transport sailed for Guadalcanal where the task force remained until 8 September when it sortied for the Palaus. The ships were at the Palaus on 15 September when elements of the 1st Marine Division assaulted Peleliu, but Storm King and her troops were held in reserve for two days. On 17 September, she began landing her troops for the assault on Angaur. The last unit was landed on 22 September, and the ship sailed the next day for Manus, Admiralty Islands.

Storm King, now attached to the 7th Amphibious Force, sailed out of Seeadler Harbor on 5 October for New Guinea. She arrived at Lae the next day and, on the 9th, loaded troops and cargo. That afternoon, she moved to Finschhafen and the next day completed loading. On 13 October, she steamed to Hollandia. The next day, she sortied with Task Group 78.6, Reinforcement Group One, for the Philippines. The transport arrived at San Pedro Bay, Leyte, on 22 October, unloaded, and sailed that afternoon for Kossol Passage. She was there from the 25th to the 28th when she headed for the Mariana Islands.

Storm King arrived at Apra Harbor, Guam, on 31 October; loaded vehicles, cargo, and elements of the Army's 77th Division and sailed, on 3 November, for New Caledonia. Her sailing orders were modified en route on 11 November, and she arrived at Seeadler Harbor on 17 November. Two days later, she was underway for Leyte and entered Leyte Gulf on 23 November. Storm King anchored off Tarranguna, Leyte, and began unloading men and supplies. The next afternoon, the transport sailed with her group for Hollandia, New Guinea.

Storm King arrived at Humboldt Bay on 29 November and was ordered to join the flotilla preparing for the Lingayen operations. 14 December found her at Sansapor, loading cargo and troops of the Army's 6th Infantry Division. She sortied with TG 78.5 on 30 December 1944 and proceeded to the Philippine Islands.

=== 1945–1946 ===
The transport was anchored off Luzon about dawn on 9 January 1945 and began landing her assault troops. When her boats returned at 1130, Storm King began unloading vehicles and cargo and had all ashore by 1614. That evening, she got underway for Leyte Gulf and remained there from 12 to 18 January.

Storm King sailed to Biak, New Guinea, with the 3rd Lingayen Reinforcement Group. She loaded cargo on 23 January; troops of the Army's 41st Division on the 27th; and sailed for Leyte on 2 February. Her objective was changed from Lingayen to Mindoro; and she landed the troops and supplies there on the 9th, before continuing to San Pedro Bay. She then accompanied Lamar (APA-47) and Starlight (AP-175) to Samar where they delivered boats from transports returning to Pearl Harbor, on 15 February and returned to San Pedro.

Storm King received orders to proceed, via Ulithi, to Pearl Harbor and sailed on 18 February for Hawaii. However, when she arrived at Ulithi, she was ordered to Iwo Jima. She was off that island from 10 to 17 March before she anchored in the transport area on the west coast of Iwo Jima. She loaded men and equipment of the 5th Marine Division and sailed for Hawaii, via Eniwetok, arriving at Pearl Harbor on 12 April. The next day, she sailed for Hilo, Hawaii, and disembarked the troops and cargo. Upon completion of offloading on 15 April, Storm King got underway for the United States.

The transport arrived at San Francisco on 22 April for a scheduled upkeep. Upon completion of repairs, she moved to Oakland and loaded cargo and passengers. Storm King sailed for Hawaii on 20 May and arrived the following week. She discharged some passengers and troops there and picked up others for transportation to Okinawa. After calling at Eniwetok and Ulithi, she reached Buckner Bay on 14 July.

Storm King stood out of Okinawa on 25 July with Latimer (APA-152) and Comet (AP-166) and headed for the Marianas. They arrived at Guam the next day; and the ship picked up passengers, including patients, and sailed for the California coast on the 27th. She arrived at San Pedro on 10 August and discharged her cargo and passengers. After voyage repairs, she loaded ammunition, cargo, and 1,400 troops for transportation to the Philippines; sailed on 28 August; and arrived at Manila on 18 September. Eight days later, she was en route to Pearl Harbor with 1,389 passengers. That night, 26 September, at 2325, a native banca was seen off the transport's starboard bow. Storm King maneuvered to avoid collision, but the small boat changed course directly across her path. At 2329 hours, Storm King struck banca Baby Rose, which capsized. All but one of the 19 persons on board were rescued. They were later transferred to the schooner Visayan. Storm King then resumed her course for Pearl Harbor.

For the next nine months, Storm King continued shuttling passengers and cargo from overseas bases to the United States. She returned from a voyage to Manila in July 1946 and was directed to proceed to Hampton Roads for decommissioning. Storm King was struck from the Navy List on 15 August 1946 and returned to the Maritime Administration the next day.

== Awards ==
Storm King received four battle stars for World War II service.
