= USS Auburn (AGC-10) =

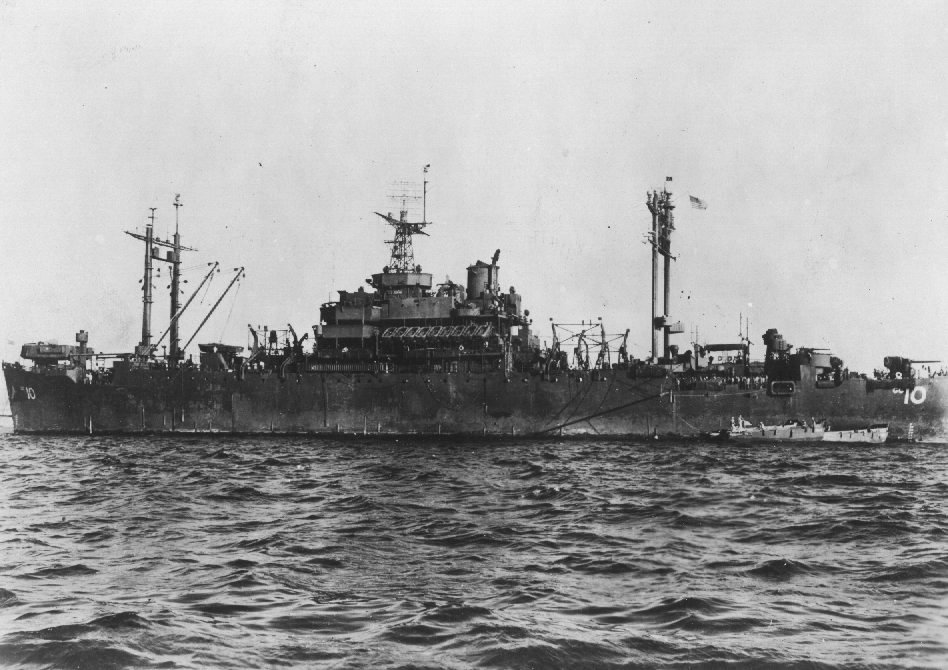
- USS Auburn in Manila Bay, August 1945.

History

United States
- Name: USS Auburn
- Builder: North Carolina Shipbuilding Company, Wilmington, North Carolina
- Laid down: 14 August 1943
- Launched: 19 October 1943
- Acquired: 31 January 1944
- Commissioned: 20 July 1944
- Decommissioned: 7 May 1947
- Stricken: 1 July 1960
- Honours and awards: 2 battle stars (WWII)
- Fate: Sold for scrap, 1961

General characteristics
- Class & type: Mount McKinley-class amphibious command ship
- Displacement: 12,750 long tons (12,955 t)
- Length: 459 ft 2 in (139.95 m)
- Beam: 63 ft (19 m)
- Draft: 26 ft (7.9 m)
- Speed: 16.4 knots (30.4 km/h; 18.9 mph)
- Complement: 686
- Armament: 2 × 5"/38 caliber guns (2×1); 8 × 40 mm guns (4×2); 14 × 20 mm guns (14×1)

USS Auburn (AGC-10) was a Mount McKinley-class amphibious force command ship, named for the hill Mount Auburn just northwest of Cambridge, Massachusetts. She was designed as an amphibious force flagship, a floating command post with advanced communications equipment and extensive combat information spaces to be used by the amphibious forces commander and landing force commander during large-scale operations.

== Commissioning ==
Laid down as the Kathay under a Maritime Commission contract (MC hull 1351) on 14 August 1943 at Wilmington, N.C., by the North Carolina Shipbuilding Company, she was launched on 19 October 1943, sponsored by Miss Julia Raney. She was acquired by the Navy on 31 January 1944 and then converted at Hoboken, New Jersey, by the Bethlehem Steel Company, for naval service as an amphibious force flagship. She was renamed the USS Auburn and designated as AGC-10, and then was commissioned at Hoboken on 20 July 1944.

== 1944 ==
After conducting shakedown training in Chesapeake Bay, the USS Auburn left Naval Station Norfolk, Virginia, on 17 August and then set a course for the Pacific Ocean. She transited the Panama Canal on the 23rd and then continued on to the Pearl Harbor Naval Base, Hawaii, where she arrived on 6 September. Three days later, the Auburn became the flagship for the Commander, Amphibious Group 2, Pacific Fleet. On 29 September, she entered Pearl Harbor for an availability. During this time, major alterations were made to her flag bridge, additional water evaporators were installed, and minor repairs were completed.

== 1945 ==
In mid-November, the ship began a series of training exercises off Maui in preparation for the invasion of the Volcano Islands. The Auburn left Hawaii on 27 January 1945, and then made port calls at Eniwetok and Saipan. She finally reached Tinian in the Marianas in early February. There she began final rehearsals for the assault on Iwo Jima. The actual landings on that island commenced on the 19th. During the operation, the Auburn coordinated and directed the movements of several hundred ships attached to Amphibious Group 2. She remained off Iwo Jima until 27 March, and then she headed for Pearl Harbor and a well-earned period of rest and recreation for her crew.

The Auburn remained in Hawaiian waters until 15 May, when she got underway for Okinawa. The ship arrived there on the 31st and became the flagship for the 5th Amphibious Forces. She controlled operations of hundreds of ships off that bitterly contested island, but escaped damage despite frequent Japanese air attacks. Okinawa was declared secure on 21 June, and the Auburn steamed for Pearl Harbor on 1 July 1945, missing the Japanese surrender on 14 August.

== Postwar ==
Shortly after her arrival at Pearl Harbor, the Auburn entered a drydock to undergo heavy repairs. While the work was in progress, the Japanese Empire capitulated on 14 August 1945. Four days later, the Auburn left Hawaii and steamed toward the Philippines. After reaching Luzon, she remained in port at Manila Bay for one month. She departed from that port on 14 September and set a course for Japan via Eniwetok and Buckner Bay, Okinawa. The ship dropped anchor at Sasebo, Japan, on 20 September.

Three days later, the Auburn got underway for Nagasaki. While there, she played an important part in establishing ship-to-shore communications and arranging facilities for occupation troops. On 25 September, she arrived at Wakayama, Japan, and began assisting forces in the occupation of Osaka, Kyoto, and several other cities to the north. In early October, she moved to Yokohama. Her occupation duty ended on 12 October, when she left Japanese waters and headed back to the West Coast of the United States.

The Auburn reached Pearl Harbor on 21 October, and she remained there a few days before continuing on eastward. She entered San Francisco Bay on 31 October. The ship was commanded to reverse her course on 5 November, and she headed back to Hawaii. She arrived at Pearl Harbor on 14 November, and she picked up several hundred military passengers for transportation to Norfolk, Virginia. The Auburn left Pearl Harbor that on same day and set a course for the Panama Canal. After transiting the canal on 29 November, the Auburn finally reached Norfolk on 7 December 1945.

Three days after her arrival at Norfolk, the Auburn became the flagship for the Commander, Training Command, Atlantic Fleet. This assignment continued until January 1947, when the Auburn was assigned to the Atlantic Reserve Fleet. She underwent deactivation preparations at the Norfolk Naval Shipyard in Hampton Roads. the Auburn was placed in reserve, out of commission, on 7 May 1947.

Her name was struck from the Naval Register on 1 July 1960, and she was transferred in November 1960 to the Maritime Administration for disposal. The Auburn was sold in 1961 and then scrapped.
