= North Carolina Shipbuilding Company =

Shipyard in Wilmington, USA

Coordinates: 34.203423°N 77.954566°W

- Type: Corporation
- Industry: Shipbuilding
- Founded: 1941
- Fate: Closed in 1946
- Headquarters: Wilmington, North Carolina, USA
- Products: Merchant vessels, warships
- Number of employees: up to 21,000

North Carolina Shipbuilding Company was a shipyard in Wilmington, North Carolina, created as part of the U.S. Government's Emergency Shipbuilding Program in the early days of World War II. From 1941 through 1946, the company built 243 ships in all, beginning with the Liberty ship SS Zebulon B. Vance, and including 54 ships of the US Navy. Most of the latter were attack cargo ships (AKA), amphibious force flagships (AGC) and ammunition ships (AE).

== History ==
The company's history began in 1940, when the U.S. government saw the acute need to build a large fleet of Merchant ships, both to fulfill commitments to the British and, if the United Kingdom fell, to strengthen its position for war. The Maritime Commission decided to allow established shipyards to build new facilities and operate them for the government. Newport News Shipbuilding and Drydock Company agreed to build a shipyard in Wilmington, adequate to deliver 25 Liberty ships by 15 March 1943. The new company was organized with Newport News executives at its head.

== Production ==
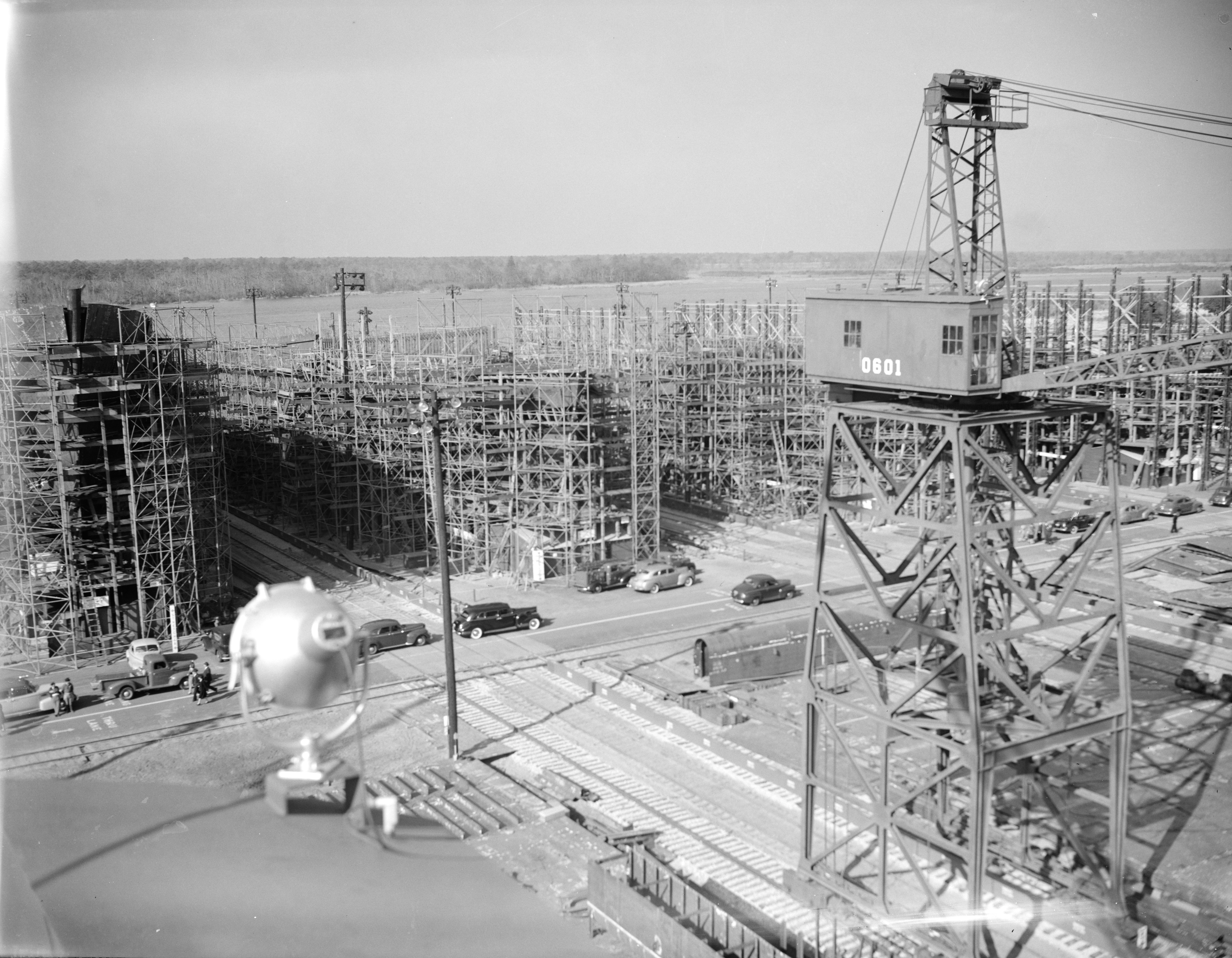
Ships under construction, circa in 1944.

A location about three miles (4.8 km) south of Wilmington on the east bank of the Cape Fear River was selected, and a tract of 56.9 acres (230,000 m^{2}) was purchased. It was considered an ideal site with the physical properties of deep fresh water, ample space, adequate feeder railroads and good climate. In addition, it was convenient to the parent company and had a large, high quality labor force close by. Construction of a yard with six shipways began on February 3, 1941. On March 18, the Maritime Commission announced that the first contract, for 25 Liberty ships, had been awarded to the company. Shipbuilding got underway with the first two keels being laid on May 22. As world tensions increased, the order for ships was increased from 25 to 37, all to be completed by March 1943. Twenty-four acres of additional land were acquired and three more shipways were added. Work proceeded rapidly, and the first Liberty ship was launched on 6 December 1941, just hours before the attack on Pearl Harbor.

The war enormously increased the nation's shipbuilding program, and in early 1942 the company accepted a contract for 53 additional Liberty ships, to be completed by 29 January 1944. Eighty more acres were purchased, and more large buildings were built. Fifty-one vessels were completed in 1942, and by the contract completion date of the original 25 in March, 1943, seventy-three ships had been delivered. Eventually, 126 Liberty ships were built at the yard. As the war progressed, the company was offered a contract for 60 larger ships, to be completed by the end of 1944. In the spring of 1944, the Navy ordered 24 new ships of type AKA, to be delivered by the end of the year. Additional orders followed.

The peak building activity came in May 1943, when 11 vessels were delivered from the company's nine shipways. At the end, the yard covered 160 acres (0.65 km^{2}) and had nine shipways, three piers, and 1,000 feet (300 m) of mooring bulkheads. There were 5,822 feet (1,775 m) of waterfront, over five miles (8.0 km) of paved roadway, nineteen miles (31 km) of railroad track, and 67 cranes.

Employment reached its peak of 21,000 in 1943. During the war, 6,813 employees of the company terminated to enter the Armed Forces and Merchant Marine. Of that number, at least 33 made the supreme sacrifice for their country.

During its five years of production, the yard produced 126 Libertys and 117 larger ships, for a total of 243. Twenty-eight of them were lost in the war: 23 to enemy action, four scuttled to form part of the breakwater used during the Normandy invasion, and one ammunition ship that exploded in the Pacific. The others remained in commercial or Navy service, many of them until the early 1970s.

Collectively, the company's employees won every award of the United States Maritime Commission. They took pride in the fact that in five years, thousands of willing but non-professional shipbuilders built a modern plant, solved the problems of training, changing requirements, and manpower drains, and built ships of a quality recognized throughout the world. On 1 May 1946, the president of the company wrote "We have accomplished our tasks and may forget the hardships and headaches in connection with it and enjoy the feeling that it has been a job well done. The combination of a few Newport News shipbuilders and a good supply of intelligent, willing North Carolina men and women has accomplished the task. We shall never have to apologize for the way it was done."

After the war, the yard was held in reserve as a stand-by yard until the 1950s, when it was liquidated. Today it is the site of a North Carolina state port.

== List of Ships Built ==
All United States Navy ship classes are complete, no other yard built ships of these classes.

- 117 of 328 Type C2 ships
  - all 10 C2-S-AJ5
  - all 6 C2-S-AJ4
  - all 32 C2-S-AJ3
    - 32 Tolland-class attack cargo ships
      - Tolland (AKA-64) ... Duplin (AKA-87)
      - Ottawa (AKA-101) ... Washburn (AKA-108)
  - all 5 C2-S-AJ2
  - all 64 C2-S-AJ1
    - 8 Mount McKinley-class command ships
      - Mount McKinley (AGC-7) ... Teton (AGC-14)
    - 3 Adirondack-class command ships
      - Adirondack (AGC-15), Pocono (AGC-16), Taconic (AGC-17)
    - 8 Mount Hood-class ammunition ships
      - Mount Hood (AE-11), Wrangell (AE-12), Firedrake (AE-14) ... Diamond Head (AE-19)
    - 2 Storm King-class transports
      - Storm King (AP-171), Starlight (AP-175)
- 126 of M EC2-S-C1 Liberty Ships
  - MC-145 ... MC-169
  - MC-217 ... MC-228
  - MC-860 ... MC-912
  - MC-1967 ... MC-2002
    - USS YAG-175

The following ships were built by the North Carolina Shipbuilding Company:

- USS Adirondack (AGC-15)
- USS Alamance (AKA-75)
- USS Auburn (AGC-10)
- USS Caswell (AKA-72)
- USS Diamond Head (AE-19)
- USS Duplin (AKA-87)
- USS Eldorado (AGC-11)
- USS Estes (AGC-12)
- USS Firedrake (AE-14)
- USS Great Sitkin (AE-17)
- USS Lenoir (AKA-74)
- USS Mount Hood (AE-11)
- USS Mount Katmai (AE-16)
- USS Mount McKinley (AGC-7)
- USS Mount Olympus (AGC-8)
- USS New Hanover (AKA-73)
- USS Ottawa (AKA-101)
- USS Panamint (AGC-13)
- USS Paricutin (AE-18)
- USS Pocono (AGC-16)
- USS Prentiss (AKA-102)
- USS Rankin (AKA-103)
- USS Seminole (AKA-104)
- USS Shoshone (AKA-65)
- USS Skagit (AKA-105)
- USS Southampton (AKA-66)
- USS Starlight (AP-175)
- USS Starr (AKA-67)
- USS Stokes (AKA-68)
- USS Storm King (AP-171)
- USS Suffolk (AKA-69)
- USS Taconic (AGC-17)
- USS Tate (AKA-70)
- USS Teton (AGC-14)
- USS Todd (AKA-71)
- USS Tolland (AKA-64)
- USS Torrance (AKA-76)
- USS Towner (AKA-77)
- USS Trego (AKA-78)
- USS Trousdale (AKA-79)
- USS Tyrrell (AKA-80)
- USS Union (AKA-106)
- USS Valencia (AKA-81)
- USS Venango (AKA-82)
- USS Vermilion (AKA-107)
- USS Vesuvius (AE-15)
- USS Vinton (AKA-89)
- USS Wasatch (AGC-9)
- USS Washburn (AKA-108)
- USS Waukesha (AKA-84)
- USS Wheatland (AKA-85)
- USS Woodford (AKA-86)
- USS Wrangell (AE-12)
- USS YAG-175

== See also ==
- Atlantic Reserve Fleet, Wilmington

== Sources ==
- Five Years of North Carolina Shipbuilding, 1946, by North Carolina Shipbuilding Company
- Ships for Victory: A History of Shipbuilding under the U.S. Maritime Commission in World War II, by Frederic C. Lane ISBN 0-8018-6752-5
- The Wilmington Shipyard: Welding a Fleet for Victory in World War II, by Ralph Scott ISBN 978-1-59629-210-9
