= USS Teton =

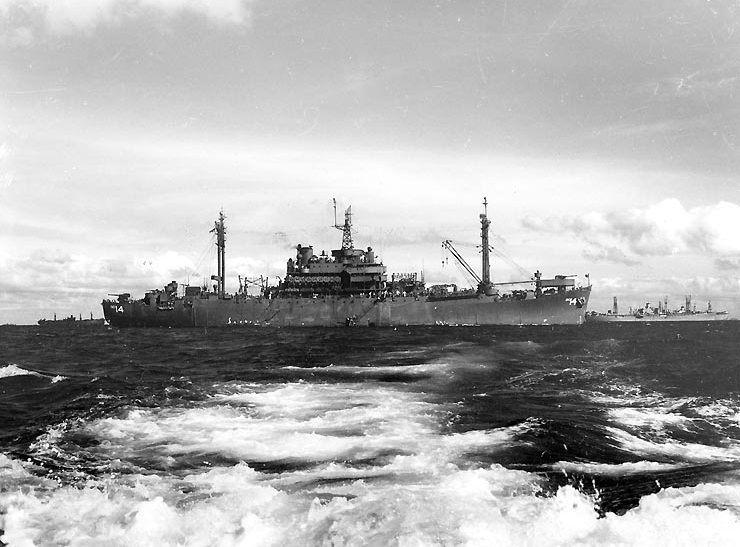
- USS Teton (AGC-14)

History

United States
- Name: USS Teton
- Namesake: Teton Range in Wyoming
- Laid down: 9 November 1943
- Launched: 5 February 1944
- Acquired: 18 October 1944
- Commissioned: 18 October 1944
- Decommissioned: 30 August 1946
- Stricken: 1 June 1961
- Home port: Brooklyn, NY
- Fate: Scrapped

General characteristics
- Displacement: 13,910
- Length: 459 ft 2 in (139.95 m)
- Beam: 63 ft (19 m)
- Draught: 24 ft (7.3 m)
- Propulsion: General Electric Geared turbine drive
- Speed: 16.4 knots
- Complement: 54 Officers, 568 Enlisted
- Armament: 2 × 5 in (130 mm) DP (2 × 1); 8 × 40 mm AA (4 × 2); 10 × 20 mm AA (10 × 1)

USS Teton (AGC-14) was a Mount McKinley-class amphibious force command ship in the United States Navy.

== Commissioning and 1944 ==
Teton was laid down under Maritime Commission contract (MC hull 1363) as Water Witch on 9 November 1943 by the North Carolina Shipbuilding Company in Wilmington, North Carolina; launched on 5 February 1944, sponsored by Mrs. C. E. Shimp; renamed Teton on 7 February 1944; acquired by the Navy on 18 October 1944; and commissioned the same day at Brooklyn, New York.

Following shakedown in the Chesapeake Bay, the amphibious force flagship, escorted by USS Barr (APD-39), steamed south; transited the Panama Canal;proceeded, via the Mare Island Navy Yard, to Hawaii; and arrived at Pearl Harbor on 19 January 1945. In Pearl Harbor the ship's captain was relieved of his command for hitting the wall of the Panama Canal during the transit. Four days later, Rear Admiral John L. Hall, Commander, Amphibious Group 12, Amphibious Forces, Pacific Fleet, hoisted his flag as his staff came on board.

== 1945-1946 ==
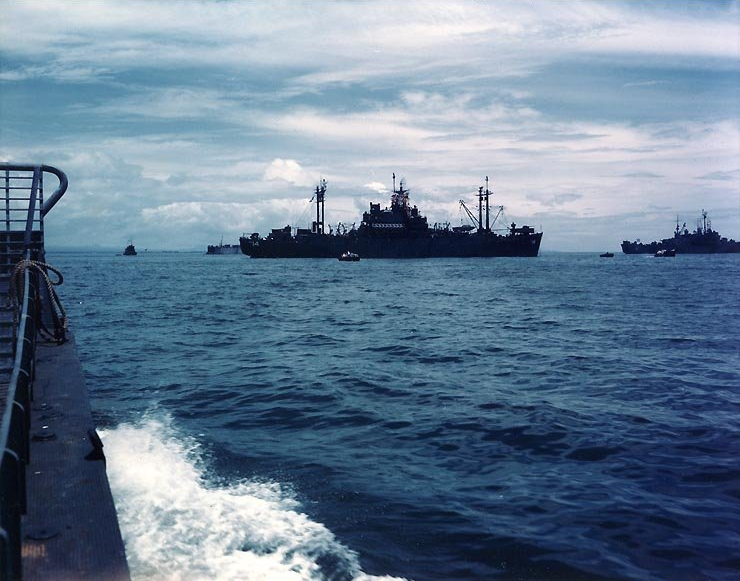
Teton in Subic Bay, July 1945.

Teton was attached to a convoy that got underway for the Philippines on 28 January. After stops at Eniwetok, Ulithi, and the Palaus, the force reached Leyte on 21 February. Teton next began rehearsals as flagship of Task Force 44 for the forthcoming assault against the Ryukyus. Commodore Clifford Greer Richardson, commanding Transport Squadron 14, and Major General John R. Hodge, commanding the XXIV Army Corps, embarked with their staffs. On 27 March, Teton got underway as flagship of Task Unit 51.13.1 and arrived off Okinawa on 1 April, the day the assault began. She remained there for 72 days controlling the landing operations on the Hagushi beaches and then providing standby control of offensive and defensive air operations. On 11 June, the ship got underway in a convoy bound for the Philippines.

Teton survived over 150 suicide plane attacks during the battle.

Teton arrived at Subic Bay on 15 June and remained there until 17 August. When news of Japan's surrender arrived, Admiral Hall and his staff left the ship to transfer to USS Hansford (APA-106). Teton embarked Army forces for the occupation of Japan and proceeded to Honshū, arriving in Tokyo Bay on 29 August.

Teton was present on 2 September when the Japanese Instrument of Surrender was signed on board the battleship USS Missouri (BB-63).

Teton stood out of Tokyo Bay on 25 September and headed for Guam to embark approximately 750 passengers for transportation to the United States. The ship reached San Francisco on 16 October; disembarked her passengers; and steamed west again three days later.

== Decommissioning ==
Teton continued duty with the "Magic-Carpet" Fleet, returning servicemen from Pacific bases to the United States until early 1946. She began inactivation at San Diego in March 1946 and was decommissioned there on 30 August 1946. Teton was struck from the Navy list on 1 June 1961 and sold for scrap in March 1962 to Union Minerals and Alloys Corporation, New York, New York.

== Awards ==
- Asiatic-Pacific Campaign Medal one battle star
- World War II Victory Medal
- Navy Occupation Medal with "ASIA" clasp
