= USS Skagit =

Cargo ship of the United States Navy

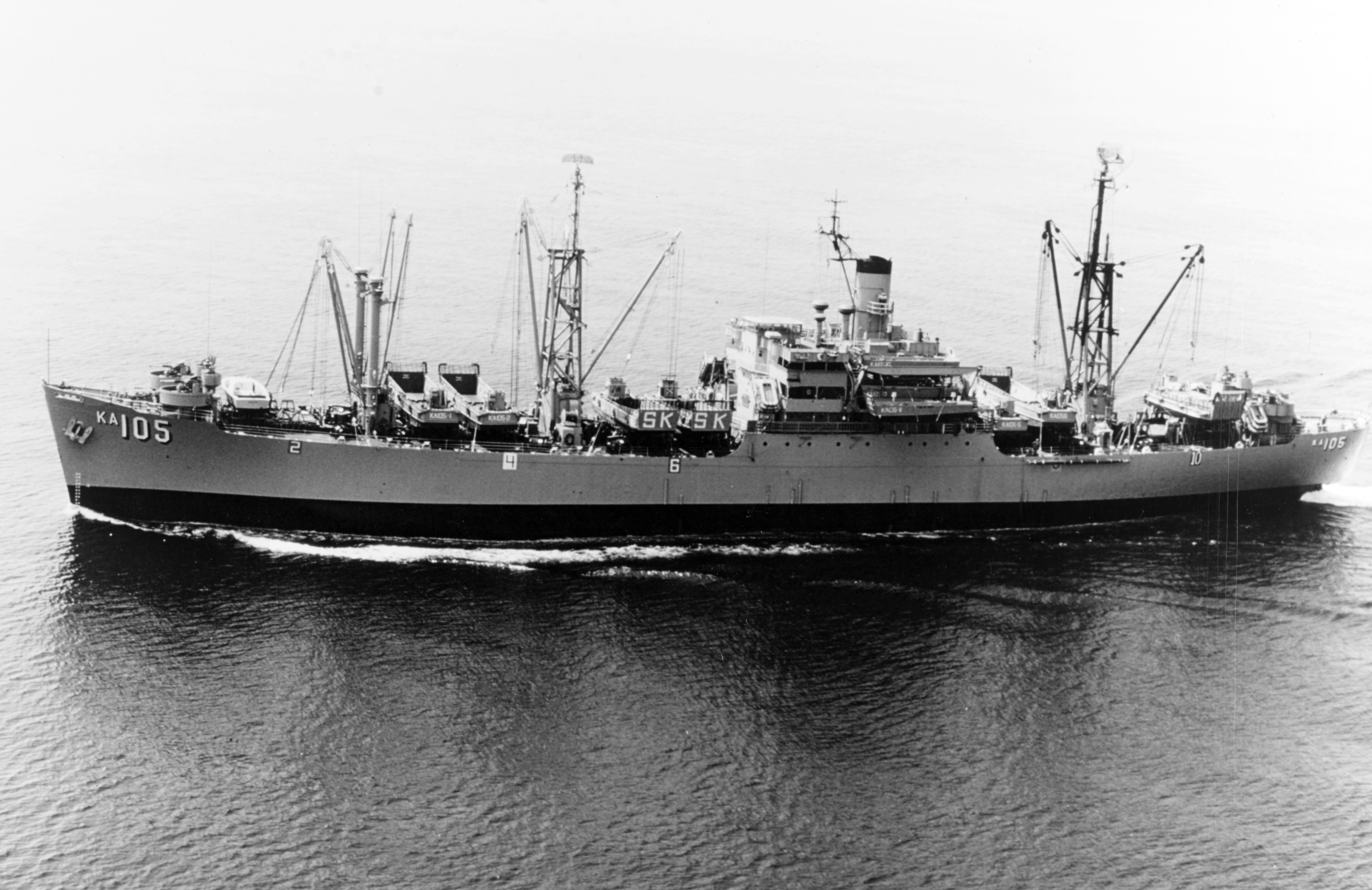

History

United States
- Name: USS Skagit
- Namesake: Skagit County, Washington
- Ordered: July 1944
- Builder: North Carolina Shipbuilding Company, Wilmington, North Carolina
- Laid down: 21 September 1944
- Launched: 18 November 1944
- Acquired: 28 November 1944
- Commissioned: 2 May 1945
- Decommissioned: 30 June 1949
- Recommissioned: 26 August 1950
- Decommissioned: 1 July 1969
- Stricken: 1 July 1969
- Honors and awards: 2 battle stars (Korea); 2 battle stars (Vietnam)
- Fate: Sold for scrap, 22 April 1974

General characteristics
- Class & type: Tolland-class attack cargo ship
- Displacement: 8,635 long tons (8,774 t) light; 13,910 long tons (14,133 t) full
- Length: 459 ft 2 in (139.95 m)
- Beam: 63 ft (19 m)
- Draft: 26 ft 4 in (8.03 m)
- Propulsion: GE geared turbine drive, single propeller, 6,000 hp (4,474 kW)
- Speed: 16.5 knots (30.6 km/h; 19.0 mph)
- Range: 17,000 miles (27,359 km)
- Boats & landing craft carried: 14 × LCVP; 8 × LCM
- Capacity: 380,000 ft^{3} (11.000 m³), 5,275 tons
- Complement: 62 officers, 333 men
- Armament: 1 × 5"/38 caliber gun; 4 × twin 40 mm guns; 16 × 20 mm guns

USS Skagit (AKA-105/LKA-105) was a Tolland-class attack cargo ship in service with the United States Navy from 1945 to 1949 and from 1950 to 1969. She was scrapped in 1974.

== History ==
Skagit (AKA-105) was named after Skagit County, Washington. She laid down as a Type C2-S-AJ3 ship MC hull 1696 on 21 September 1944 by North Carolina Shipbuilding Company, Wilmington, North Carolina; launched on 18 November 1944; sponsored by Miss Heloise Pike; acquired by the Navy on 28 November 1944; converted by the Bethlehem Steel Co., Brooklyn, N.Y., into an attack cargo ship; and commissioned on 2 May 1945.

=== World War II, 1945 ===
Skagit completed preparations for sea and sailed for Norfolk, Virginia on 13 May. After completing shakedown, the ship stood out of port on 3 June en route to Marseille, France. She arrived there on 16 June; loaded cargo and passengers bound for Manila, Philippines; and sailed again on the 29th.

Skagit arrived at Manila on 15 August, discharged her cargo there and reloaded with supplies for Tokyo. She was present at the surrender ceremony in Tokyo Bay on 2 September 1945.

=== Post-war activities, 1945–1949 ===
For the remainder of the year, the ship shuttled supplies and troops between American bases in the Far East, calling at Okinawa, Guam, Tientsin, Tsingtao, and Shanghai. She returned to the West Coast on 16 December 1945 and operated out of San Diego with Amphibious Forces, Pacific Fleet until 22 June 1946 when she was deployed to Pearl Harbor for three months. She then returned to San Diego until 22 February 1947 when she sailed for Okinawa. Skagit operated between Okinawa, Guam, and China until the following November, broken only by a 19-day cruise back to the West Coast in July.

In early 1948, the cargo ship was fitted out to make a polar expedition. On 26 July, Skagit departed the United States with the Point Barrow, Alaska, Expedition and remained there until 23 August. She was back in Alaskan waters in January and February 1949. The cargo ship returned to San Francisco on 25 February; was prepared for inactivation; and, on 30 June, was placed out of commission, in reserve, and berthed at the Mare Island Naval Shipyard.

=== Korean War, 1950–1953 ===
On 25 June 1950, the North Korean People's Army invaded South Korea. This necessitated a fast increase in American surface shipping to meet the logistical demand placed upon it. Many ships of the mothball fleet were reactivated; and, on 26 August 1950, Skagit was placed in full commission. She moved to San Diego for shakedown training and then trained other crews until 26 March 1951.

On that date, the cargo ship sailed for Pusan, South Korea, with troops and combat supplies. After unloading, she proceeded to Yokosuka and conducted landing exercises for elements of the Army's 40th Division. This training period was interrupted for a month in May when Skagit was ordered to sail to Inchon at flank speed to evacuate personnel and equipment if the situation there became more critical. However, Inchon was secured, and the ship resumed normal overseas operations until returning to San Diego on 15 October 1951.

Skagit was deployed to the Far East again from May to December 1952. The Army was setting up new prisoner of war camps at Yongcho Do and Pongnam Do as a result of the riots at Koje Do. Skagit transported construction material to the new sites from Pusan and then assisted in the transfer of prisoners.

=== Pacific operations, 1954–1964 ===
During her deployment in 1954, Skagit was ordered to Tourane, French Indochina, to participate in "Operation Passage to Freedom". The ship transported 4,089 refugees from Hai Phong in the north to Saigon and Cape St. Jacques in the south. The refugees were fleeing from the communists then closing in on Hanoi and Hai Phong. She returned to San Diego on 21 November 1954.

For the next ten years, the cargo ship divided her time between the western Pacific and operations along the West Coast, south to Acapulco, Mexico, and north to Alaska.

=== Vietnam, 1965–1967 ===
On 23 August 1965, Skagit deployed to the Far East and remained there until 14 May 1966. This was not to be a peacetime cruise as during the past decade. The United States was committed to the defense of South Vietnam, and the services of Skagit were required for combat operations. On her way west, she carried cargo and Marines to Okinawa. Between 13 November and 8 December 1965, she delivered two loads of cargo from Okinawa to Da Nang. In January 1966, Skagit embarked combat cargo and combat-loaded marines at Okinawa in preparation for an amphibious landing. On 28 January, Skagit, as a unit of Task Group 76.6 made an assault landing near Thach Tru in southern Quảng Ngãi Province, in Operation Double Eagle. Twelve amphibious force ships landed 5,000 United States Marines against the Viet Cong and North Vietnamese there. On 16 February, the ship proceeded to Chu Lai to unload her remaining cargo. In early March, she returned to Okinawa for another load of cargo and, upon her return to Vietnam, spent the remainder of the month shuttling supplies between Da Nang, Phu Bai, and Chu Lai.

Skagit entered the Todd Shipyard, San Pedro, California, on 25 October 1966 for an overhaul and remained there until 7 March 1967. On 31 May, the ship deployed to the western Pacific for a seven-month tour. She offloaded her cargo at Da Nang on 29 June and sailed to Sasebo for voyage repairs. One repair was the replacement of the propeller and shaft, which were damaged when the propeller struck a log in port. It left Sasebo for Manila to load prefabricated schoolhouses, which were delivered to Tacloban, Cagayan de Oro, and Zamboanga. Then there was a short stop again in Manila, then in Subic Bay (Olongapo). Skagit returned to Vietnam and during the period from 15 September to 1 November, she used her LCMs to transport more than 6,700 tons of combat supplies and prefabricated airport materials from Da Nang up the Perfume River to Huế.

=== Decommissioning and fate ===
Skagit returned to San Diego on 10 December 1967, and operated along the West Coast until 4 April 1969 when she was notified to prepare for inactivation. Her designation had been changed from AKA-105, attack cargo ship, to LKA-105, amphibious cargo ship on 1 January 1969. Skagit was decommissioned and struck from the Navy List on 1 July 1969. On that date, she was also transferred to the Maritime Administration for disposal. She was sold for scrap in 1974.

== Awards ==
Skagit received two battle stars for Korean service and two for service in Vietnam.
