= SS Flying Eagle =

SS Flying Eagle may refer to the following ships:

- SS Flying Eagle (1944), a Type C2-S-AJ1 ship; renamed Del Alba in 1946; broken up in 1970
- SS Flying Eagle (1945), a Type C2-S-AJ3 ship; the former Tolland-class attack cargo ship USS Venango (AKA-82); named Flying Eagle from 1952 to 1968; broken up in 1971 in Spain
