= USS Todd =

Cargo ship of the United States Navy

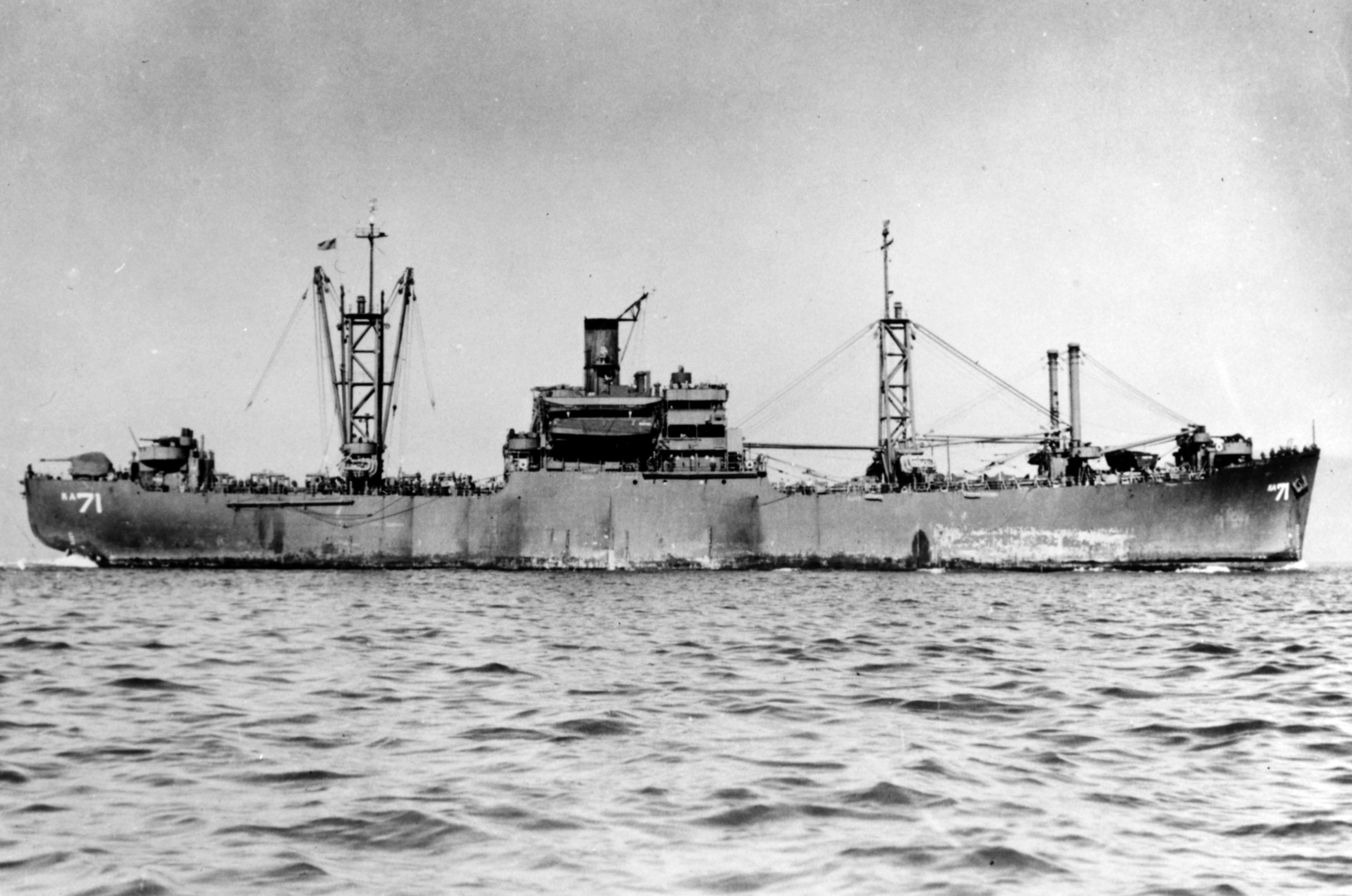

History

United States
- Name: USS Todd
- Namesake: Todd County, Kentucky; Todd County, Minnesota; Todd County, South Dakota
- Builder: North Carolina Shipbuilding Company, Wilmington, North Carolina
- Laid down: 10 August 1944
- Launched: 10 October 1944
- Commissioned: 30 November 1944
- Decommissioned: 25 June 1946
- Renamed: SS Ventura; SS Hawaiian Wholesaler; SS Chatham
- Stricken: 19 July 1946
- Fate: Sold for commercial service, scrapped 22 February 1972

General characteristics
- Class & type: Tolland-class attack cargo ship
- Displacement: 13,910 long tons (14,133 t) full
- Length: 459 ft 2 in (139.95 m)
- Beam: 63 ft (19 m)
- Draft: 26 ft 4 in (8.03 m)
- Propulsion: General Electric geared turbine drive, single propeller, 6,000shp
- Speed: 16.5 knots (30.6 km/h; 19.0 mph)
- Complement: 395
- Armament: 1 × 5"/38 caliber gun; 4 × twin 40 mm guns; 16 × single 20 mm AA gun mounts

USS Todd (AKA-71) was a Tolland-class attack cargo ship in service with the United States Navy from 1944 to 1946. She was sold into commercial service and was scrapped in 1972.

== History ==
Todd was named after counties in Kentucky, Minnesota, and South Dakota. She was laid down under United States Maritime Commission contract (MC hull 1400) on 10 August 1944 at Wilmington, North Carolina, by the North Carolina Shipbuilding Co.; launched on 10 October 1944; sponsored by Mrs. R. Gregg Cherry; acquired by the Navy from the War Shipping Administration on 14 November; and commissioned on 30 November 1944.

=== World War II, 1944–1945 ===
The ship held shakedown training in the Chesapeake Bay and then moved up the coast to Davisville, Rhode Island, to load cargo. On 4 January 1945, Todd began an independent voyage to Hawaii. She transited the Panama Canal on 11 January and arrived at Pearl Harbor on the 26th. She unloaded her cargo, participated in training exercises for two weeks, and got underway for New Caledonia on 12 February.

On 22 February, Todd arrived at Nouméa to await further orders. During the next 10 weeks, the ship moved only once and that was to carry tracked landing vehicles 50 miles up the coast to Uarai Bay for the Army. She left Nouméa on 3 May and proceeded, via Manus, to the Philippines. The cargo ship arrived at Leyte on 16 May and headed for Hollandia 12 days later. She loaded troops and supplies and returned to Manila on 17 June. Todd then made two more round-trips from the Philippines to New Guinea. The ship was unloading cargo at Subic Bay when hostilities with Japan ceased.

=== Post-war activities, 1945–1946 ===
She embarked occupation troops, with their equipment, at Manila and got underway for Japan on 27 August. The troops disembarked at Yokohama on 2 September. A voyage from the Philippines to Okinawa and another from the Philippines to Japan followed. In October and early November, she made calls at Hong Kong and Qingdao before proceeding to Sasebo. Todd embarked elements of the 5th Marine Division and departed Japan for the United States on 7 December.

The ship arrived at San Diego on 22 December 1945 and disembarked her passengers. She moved to San Pedro the next day and off-loaded ammunition. Todd proceeded to San Francisco on 9 January 1946 and entered the Hunters Point Naval Shipyard for voyage repairs. Between 15 February and 15 March, she made one last voyage to Hawaii.

=== Decommissioning ===
On 5 April, Todd stood out of San Francisco bound for Norfolk and inactivation. She arrived on 1 May and was decommissioned on 25 June 1946. Todd was returned to the War Shipping Administration the next day and was struck from the Navy List on 19 July 1946.

=== Civilian service and fate ===
Ex-USS Todd was sold on 26 September 1947 to Oceanic Steamship Company and renamed SS Ventura. After 14 years of service, she was sold by Oceanic to Matson Navigation Company and renamed SS Hawaiian Wholesaler on 25 March 1961. A few months later (20 July 1961) she was sold again, this time to Sea-Land Service, Inc. who renamed her SS Chatham. Sea-Land used the old AKA for a little less than three years before transferring her to the Maritime Administration as part of the MARAD exchange program, 13 May 1965. MARAD sold the ship on 15 May 1969 to Gatx/Boothe Corp. On 22 February 1972, she was sold for the final time, to Sing Cheng Yug Iron and Steel of Taiwan for scrapping.
