= USS Torrance =

Cargo ship of the United States Navy

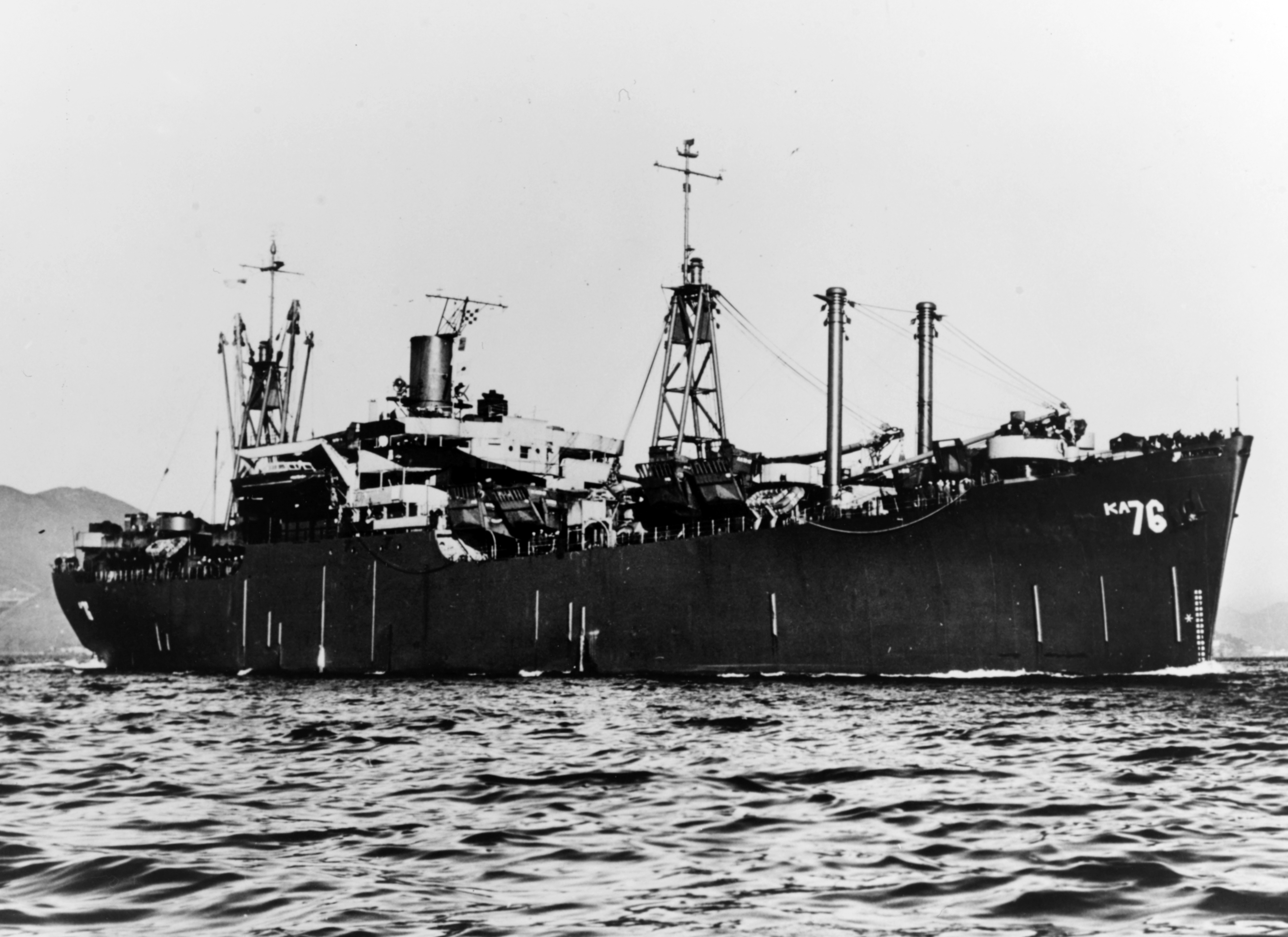

History

United States
- Name: USS Torrance
- Namesake: Torrance County, New Mexico
- Builder: North Carolina Shipbuilding Company, Wilmington, North Carolina
- Laid down: 1 April 1944
- Launched: 6 June 1944
- Acquired: 20 June 1944
- Commissioned: 18 November 1944
- Decommissioned: 20 June 1946
- Renamed: SS Alcoa Roamer; SS Eldorado; SS Richmond; SS Singapore Trader
- Stricken: 3 July 1946
- Honors and awards: 1 battle star (World War II)
- Fate: Sold into merchant service, 15 September 1947; Scrapped at Santander, Spain starting in August 1972

General characteristics
- Class & type: Tolland-class attack cargo ship
- Displacement: 14,160 long tons (14,387 t) full
- Length: 459 ft 2 in (139.95 m)
- Beam: 63 ft (19 m)
- Draft: 26 ft 4 in (8.03 m)
- Speed: 16.5 knots (30.6 km/h; 19.0 mph)
- Complement: 395
- Armament: 1 × 5"/38 caliber gun; 4 × twin 40 mm guns; 16 × 20 mm guns

USS Torrance (AKA-76) was a Tolland-class attack cargo ship in service with the United States Navy from 1944 to 1946. She was sold into commercial service and was scrapped in 1972.

== History ==
Torrance was named after Torrance County, New Mexico. She was laid down as a Type C2-S-AJ3 ship under a United States Maritime Commission contract (MC hull 1382) on 1 April 1944 at Wilmington, North Carolina, by the North Carolina Shipbuilding Co.; launched on 6 June 1944; sponsored by Miss Marlene DeKay; acquired by the Navy on 20 June and towed to the Bethlehem Steel Company plant at Hoboken, New Jersey, for conversion to an attack cargo ship; and commissioned on 18 November 1944.

=== World War II, 1944–1945 ===
Following commissioning, Torrance underwent 10 days of trials in Long Island Sound before setting course for Hampton Roads on 28 November. Soon after arriving in Norfolk the next day, the cargo ship conducted shakedown training in Hampton Roads. Leaving Norfolk after shaking down, Torrance headed for the west coast.

Upon arrival in Caribbean waters on 17 December, she received orders to proceed to San Francisco, California. She entered the Pacific from the Panama Canal on Christmas Eve and arrived in San Francisco on 2 January 1945. There she took on board supplies earmarked for South Pacific bases and set out for South Sea isles on the 13th.

She made port at Milne Bay, New Guinea, on 31 January, then proceeded to Manus, in the Admiralties, where she arrived on 3 February. Torrance next returned to the New Guinea coast, this time to Hollandia, where she arrived on Saint Valentine's Day. Receiving orders directing her to the Philippines, the ship joined Transport Division 49, Transport Squadron 17, bound for Leyte.

Torrance and other ships in her division engaged in intensive exercises off Cabugan Island, near Leyte, in mid-March. On 21 March, the attack cargo ship embarked the men and materiel of the Army Engineers 305th Regimental Combat Team and joined a convoy bound for the Ryukyus.

Torrance arrived in waters off Okinawa early in the campaign, but remained in reserve off the Hagushi beaches until her division launched a feint attack and landing on the southeast coast of Okinawa on 19 April 1945. She completed the diversionary operation and returned briefly to Hagushi before delivering combat supplies to Ie Shima. Then, back at Hagushi, she unloaded the remainder of her cargo, despite heavy seas and relentless attacks by Japanese kamikazes, during which Torrance's anti-aircraft gunners shot down two enemy aircraft.

The enemy assault came not only from the skies – in the form of kamikazes – and from the sea – in the small, fast suicide motor boats – but also from concealed shore batteries, whose salvoes landed uncomfortably close to the transports and their escorts. The transports – including Torrance – shifted anchorage to safer waters, as destroyers and cruiser gunfire and carrier-based planes dealt with the shore guns.

Despite these difficulties the conquest of Okinawa moved steadily forward. Torrance cleared the battle area and dropped anchor at Saipan on 5 May to await further orders. On 22 May, she departed the Marshall Islands, bound for the west coast of the United States.

The attack cargo ship reached San Francisco on 6 June and commenced voyage repairs which lasted until the 24th, when she set out for Seattle, Washington. Torrance remained in the northwest coastal waters until she once more headed westward into the Pacific.

Arriving at Eniwetok on 17 July for an 11-day layover, she unloaded her cargo from the United States. For the remainder of the war, the attack cargo ship operated in support of the Fleet and its bases in waters of the Philippines and off Korea and provided supplies for the American occupation forces in the Japanese home islands.

=== Post-war activities, 1945–1946 ===
She first reached Japan when she made port at Sasebo on 23 November 1945. From there, she steamed back to Seattle, where she arrived on 10 December and remained into the New Year. Late in January, she shifted south and moored at San Francisco on 27 January 1946. She made one more cargo-carrying voyage to Pearl Harbor before returning to the west coast en route to the Canal Zone.

=== Decommissioning and fate ===
Transiting the Panama Canal on 29 April, Torrance pointed her bow towards Jacksonville, Florida, where she received orders to report to the Commandant of the 5th Naval District, Norfolk, Virginia for inactivation. Arriving in Hampton Roads on 9 May 1946, she was decommissioned at Norfolk on 20 June 1946. Delivered to the War Shipping Administration two days later, Torrance was struck from the Navy List on 3 July 1946 and laid up with many of her sisters in the reserve fleet at James River.

Purchased by the Alcoa Steamship Company of New York on 15 September 1947, the erstwhile attack cargo ship was renamed SS Alcoa Roamer and engaged in the freight-carrying trade through 1968. Given the name SS Eldorado when taken over by the Clairship Navigation Corp. of New York on 30 March 1968, she operated with that carrier until sold at auction by the U.S. Marshal Service to Levin Metals Corp on 20 January 1970. Resold in turn by Levin to the Richmond Shipping Company she was renamed SS Richmond and reflagged Panamanian. Later in 1970 Richmond Shipping sold her to Far East Shipbreakers but she once again escaped scrapping, being sold by that company and named SS Singapore Trader. In October 1971 she was nearing the end of a voyage from Japan to Detroit, Michigan when she ran aground in the Saint Lawrence Seaway. The hulk was refloated in 1972 and arrested in Montreal, Canada until sold at auction later that year. After being towed across the Atlantic the old AKA finally met her end, being scrapped at Santander, Spain beginning in August 1972.

== Awards ==
Torrance received one battle star for her World War II service.
