= USS Shoshone (AKA-65) =

Cargo ship of the United States Navy

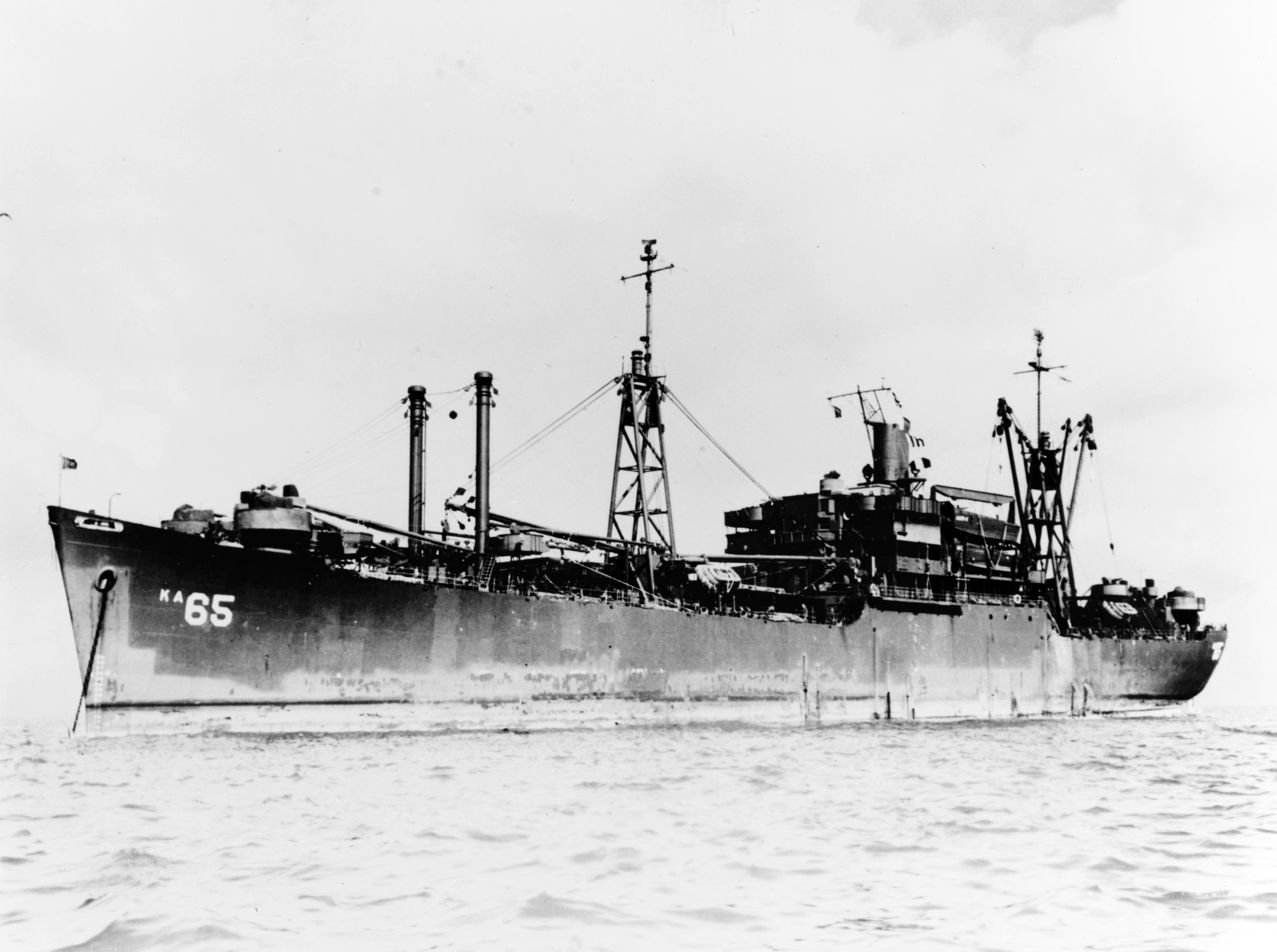
- USS Shoshone

History

United States
- Name: USS Shoshone
- Namesake: Shoshone River
- Builder: North Carolina Shipbuilding Company, Wilmington, North Carolina
- Laid down: 12 May 1944
- Launched: 17 July 1944
- Commissioned: 24 September 1944
- Decommissioned: 28 June 1946
- Stricken: 19 July 1946
- Honors and awards: 2 battle stars (World War II)
- Fate: Sold into merchant service, 1947; Scrapped, 1971

General characteristics
- Class & type: Tolland-class attack cargo ship
- Displacement: 6,318 long tons (6,419 t)
- Length: 459 ft 2 in (139.95 m)
- Beam: 63 ft (19 m)
- Draft: 26 ft 4 in (8.03 m)
- Speed: 16.5 knots (30.6 km/h; 19.0 mph)
- Complement: 395
- Armament: 1 × 5"/38 caliber gun; 4 × twin 40 mm guns; 16 × 20 mm guns

USS Shoshone (AKA-65) was a Tolland-class attack cargo ship of the United States Navy, named after a river in Wyoming. She was designed to carry military cargo and landing craft, and to use the latter to land weapons, supplies, and Marines on enemy shores during amphibious operations. USS Shoshone served as a commissioned ship for 21 months.

She was laid down as a Type C2-S-AJ3 ship on 12 May 1944 under United States Maritime Commission contract (MC hull 1388) by the North Carolina Shipbuilding Company, Wilmington, North Carolina, and launched on 17 July 1944, sponsored by Mrs. N. J. Smith. Briefly in commission, from 31 August to 4 September 1944, for the voyage from Wilmington to the Charleston Navy Yard, where she completed fitting out and was commissioned on 24 September 1944.

== Service history ==
=== World War II, 1944–1945 ===
Shoshone arrived at Norfolk on 5 October 1944 and underwent shakedown training in Hampton Roads and Chesapeake Bay from 7 to 18 October. After repairs, she arrived at Bayonne, New Jersey, on 26 October to load cargo for the Pacific. Underway from Bayonne on 2 November, she transited the Panama Canal on the 9th and arrived on the 22nd at Pearl Harbor, where she discharged her cargo. After undergoing amphibious training from 6 to 16 December, she loaded assault cargo and personnel of the 4th Marine Division (United States) at Maui, from 4 to 9 January 1945. She underwent additional training between 12 and 14 January; but, on 13 January, Muliphen (AKA-61) rammed her stern, necessitating repairs at Pearl Harbor from 14 to 25 January.

Shoshone departed Pearl Harbor on 25 January and arrived at Saipan on 11 February. She participated in an invasion rehearsal off Tinian the next day, and departed Saipan on 16 February for the invasion of Iwo Jima. She arrived off Iwo Jima early on 19 February, sent her boats to help offload troops from the attack transports, and discharged small amounts of high priority cargo as called for by the troops ashore. On 26 February, general unloading of cargo began, and Shoshone completed unloading on 1 March and departed Iwo Jima the same day.

Shoshone arrived at Saipan on 4 March and completed loading personnel and equipment of the 2nd Marine Division by the 8th. She underwent training at Tinian between 17 and 19 March, and departed Saipan on 27 March for the Okinawa invasion. She arrived off Okinawa on 1 April, but never landed her troops there – she was ordered to a position 350 miles southeast of Okinawa on 7 April; and, on 11 April, was ordered to return to Saipan. Arriving there on 14 April, she offloaded her troops and supplies on 23 May. On 4 June 1945, Shoshone departed Saipan; and for the next three months, she carried cargo between Western Pacific bases.

=== Post-war activities, 1945–1946 ===
Shoshone arrived at Manila on 10 September, and sailed on 17 September as part of a force carrying occupation troops of the 81st Army Division and other 8th Army units to Aomori, Honshu, Japan. She arrived there on 25 September, moved to Otaru Harbor, Hokkaidō, on 5 October; and offloaded her troops and supplies on 6 and 7 October. Departing Hokkaidō on 12 October, she loaded additional Army troops and equipment at Leyte Gulf between 21 and 29 October, and arrived back at Aomori on 5 November.

On 19 November, Shoshone sailed from Japan for Seattle with 411 homeward-bound servicemen. Arriving on 29 November, she underwent repairs until 23 December, when she sailed for San Francisco. Between 6 January and 15 February 1946, she made a round-trip from San Francisco to Pearl Harbor; and, on 16 May, departed San Francisco with supplies for Kwajalein and Guam. Departing Guam on 25 April, she transited the Panama Canal on 18 and 19 May and arrived at Norfolk, Virginia, on 24 May for deactivation.

=== Decommissioning and sale ===
Shoshone was decommissioned on 28 June 1946, transferred to the War Shipping Administration on 30 June and struck from the Navy List on 19 July. Sold into mercantile service as Alameda in 1947, she was renamed Hawaiian Trader in 1961, Short Hills in 1961, Colorado in 1964, and U. S. Mate in 1966, before being scrapped in 1971 at Kaohsiung, Taiwan.

== Awards ==
Shoshone received two battle stars for her World War II service.
