= USS Alamance =

Cargo ship of the United States Navy

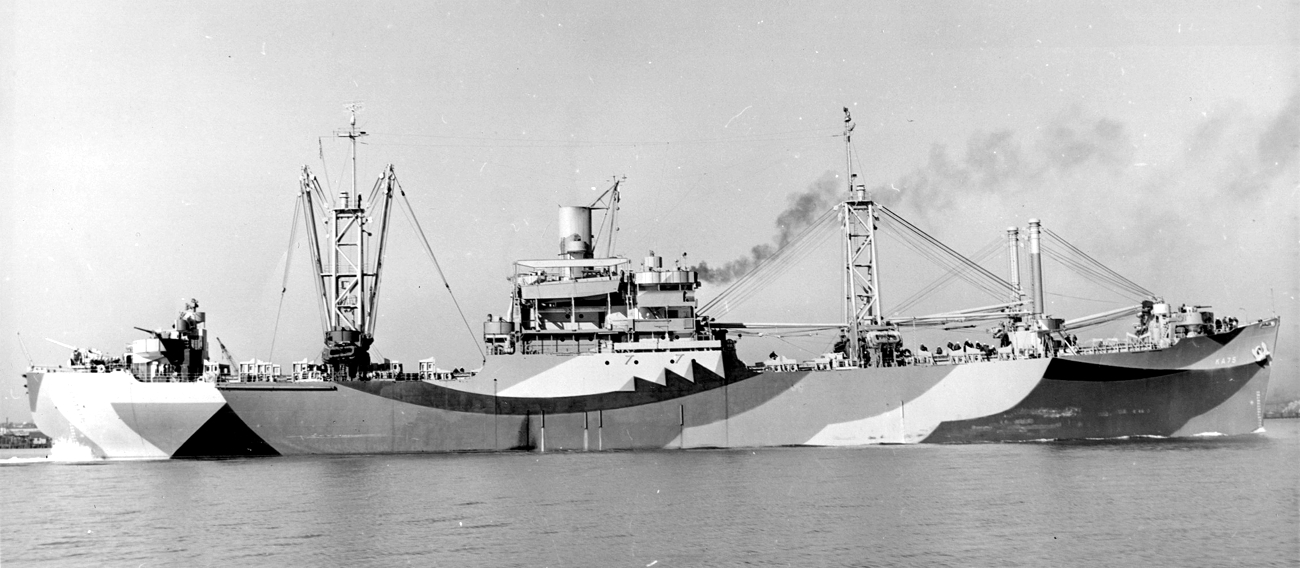

History

United States
- Name: USS Alamance
- Namesake: Alamance County, North Carolina
- Builder: North Carolina Shipbuilding Company, Wilmington, North Carolina
- Laid down: 15 September 1944
- Launched: 11 November 1944
- Commissioned: 22 December 1944
- Decommissioned: 25 June 1946
- Renamed: SS Southstar; SS American Supplier; SS Alcoa Voyager; SS Columbia Fox; SS Antillian Fox
- Stricken: 19 July 1946
- Fate: Sold for merchant service; Scrapped 1971 in Taiwan

General characteristics
- Class & type: Tolland-class attack cargo ship
- Displacement: 14,160 long tons (14,387 t) full
- Length: 459 ft 2 in (139.95 m)
- Beam: 63 ft (19 m)
- Draft: 26 ft 4 in (8.03 m)
- Propulsion: GE geared turbine drive, single propeller, 6,000 hp (4.5 MW)
- Speed: 16.5 knots (30.6 km/h; 19.0 mph)
- Complement: 395
- Armament: 1 × 5-inch/38-caliber gun; 4 × twin 40 mm guns; 16 × 20 mm guns

USS Alamance (AKA-75) was a Tolland-class attack cargo ship in service with the United States Navy from 1944 to 1946. She was sold into commercial service and was scrapped in 1971.

== History ==
Alamance was named after Alamance County, North Carolina. She was laid down as a Type C2-S-AJ3 ship under a Maritime Commission contract (MC hull 1405) on 15 September 1944 at Wilmington, North Carolina, by the North Carolina Shipbuilding Co.; launched on 11 November 1944; sponsored by Mrs. Carl T. Durham; acquired by the Navy on 22 December 1944; and placed in commission on that same day.

=== World War II, 1945 ===
Following shakedown in the Chesapeake Bay area, the attack cargo ship got underway for the Pacific theater on 12 February 1945. She transited the Panama Canal on the 18th and proceeded to Pearl Harbor. Upon arriving there, the vessel reported to Transport Division 65 for duty. During the remainder of World War II, Alamance shuttled cargo and personnel from Pearl Harbor to ports in the Philippines, Eniwetok, Saipan, Palau Islands, and Ulithi. During the last month of the war, the ship operated out of Pearl Harbor on amphibious training exercises.

=== Post-war activities, 1945–1946 ===
On 1 September, she sailed for the Marianas where she joined a convoy transporting occupation forces to Japan. She arrived at Sasebo on the 22nd and discharged personnel and equipment of the 5th Marine Division. She then steamed on to Lingayen Gulf to load more troops.

Alamance returned to Sasebo on 18 October. After the embarked Army troops left the ship, she began the long journey back to American waters, stopping at Buckner Bay, Okinawa, en route, before continuing on to the west coast. The ship reached Portland, Oregon, on 14 November. A period of repair work was begun.

Returning to duty in early 1946, Alamance touched back at Pearl Harbor on 26 January. For the remainder of her naval career, she transported personnel from the various island bases to Pearl Harbor for eventual routing on to the United States in other ships. Alamance, herself, returned to the west coast of the United States in April. She transited the Panama Canal once again and finally anchored at Norfolk, on 13 May.

=== Decommissioning ===
The ship was placed out of commission at the Norfolk Naval Shipyard, Portsmouth, Virginia, on 25 June 1946; she was returned to the Maritime Commission for disposal. Her name was struck from the Navy List on 19 July 1946.

=== Civilian service and fate ===
Ex-USS Alamance was sold for commercial service in 1947 to Prudential Lines and renamed SS Southstar. She served under that name for about 14 years before being sold to another line. Purchase and sale records are spotty at best, but she was sold in 1961 and renamed SS American Supplier, in 1963 (presumably to the Alcoa Aluminum Company) and named SS Alcoa Voyager, in 1969 and named SS Columbia Fox, and again in 1971 being renamed for the final time as SS Antillian Fox. Later in 1971 the former AKA met her end, being scrapped in Taiwan.
