= USS Southampton (AKA-66) =

Cargo ship of the United States Navy

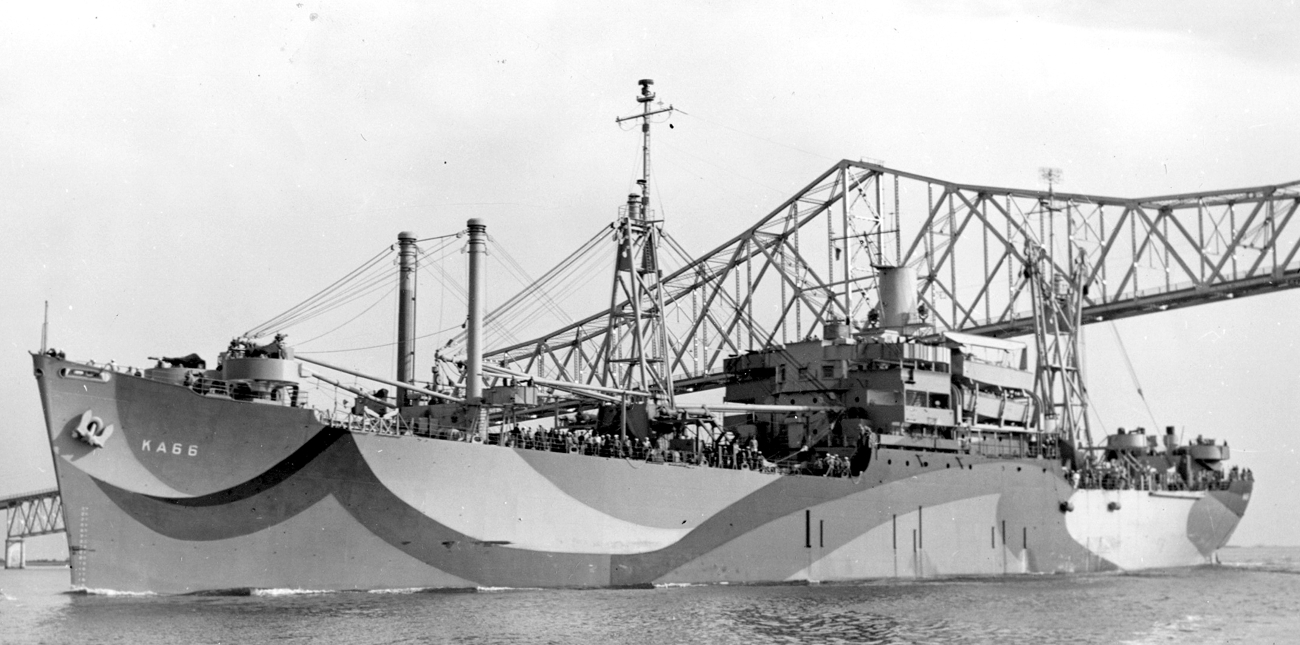

History

United States
- Name: USS Southampton
- Namesake: Southampton County, Virginia
- Builder: North Carolina Shipbuilding Company, Wilmington, North Carolina
- Laid down: 26 May 1944
- Launched: 28 July 1944
- Commissioned: 16 September 1944
- Decommissioned: 21 June 1946
- Stricken: 3 July 1946
- Honors and awards: 2 battle stars (World War II)
- Fate: Scrapped, 1971

General characteristics
- Class & type: Tolland-class attack cargo ship
- Displacement: 13,910 long tons (14,133 t) full
- Length: 459 ft 2 in (139.95 m)
- Beam: 63 ft (19 m)
- Draft: 26 ft 4 in (8.03 m)
- Speed: 16.5 knots (30.6 km/h; 19.0 mph)
- Complement: 395
- Armament: 1 × 5"/38 caliber gun; 4 × twin 40 mm guns; 16 × single 20 mm AA gun mounts

USS Southampton (AKA-66) was a Tolland-class attack cargo ship in service with the United States Navy from 1944 to 1946. She was sold into commercial service and scrapped in 1971.

== History ==
Southampton was named after Southampton County, Virginia. She was laid down as a Type C2-S-AJ3 ship on 26 May 1944 under Maritime Commission contract (MC hull 1390) by the North Carolina Shipbuilding Company, Wilmington, North Carolina. Launched on 28 July 1944, co-sponsored by Ens. Rama V. Blackwood, USNR(W); Dorothy Lazair, Y1C, USNR(W), and Mary Blackwell, Y2C, USNR(W); and acquired by the Navy on loan-charter and placed in commission on 16 September 1944. Southampton proceeded to Charleston, South Carolina, where she was decommissioned on 18 September to complete fitting-out. On 8 October, she was recommissioned at Charleston, and Lt. Comdr. Lester V. Cooke, USNR, assumed command.

=== World War II, 1944–1945 ===
She arrived at Norfolk, Virginia, on 22 October and conducted shakedown in the Chesapeake Bay from 24 October to 2 November. The attack cargo ship got underway for the Canal Zone on 5 November; transited the canal during the night of 12 and 13 November; and headed for the Hawaiian Islands.

==== Iwo Jima ====
Southampton entered Pearl Harbor on 26 November and, for the next two months, participated in amphibious exercises in the islands. She departed Pearl Harbor on 27 January 1945 with members of the 25th Regiment, 4th Marine Division, embarked. The AKA arrived at Eniwetok in the Marshall Islands on 5 February and, two days later, headed on to Saipan. She made Saipan on the 11th, conducted final invasion rehearsals off Tinian between the 13th and 15th, and got underway for Iwo Jima the following day. Southampton entered her assigned transport area off Iwo Jima on 19 February. She lowered landing craft and dispatched them to other ships of the division to ferry the assault troops to the beach. Southampton sustained her only casualties of the Iwo Jima assault during the initial landings when a mortar shell exploded close aboard one of her LCVP's and wounded the coxswain and a seaman. During the last two weeks in February, the attack cargo ship joined in unloading troops and supplies and embarking casualties from the fighting ashore. These operations were frequently interrupted by enemy air activity. On 1 March, Southampton sailed for the Marianas.

==== Okinawa ====
Southampton arrived at Saipan on 4 March, disembarked the wounded marines and sailors; and, by the 11th, began loading the combat cargo of the 2nd Marine Division. She conducted more rehearsal landings off Tinian until the 27th, and then she sailed for the Ryukyus. On 1 April 1945, she and the other ships of her task group arrived off the southeastern coast of Okinawa to feign an attack and retire. At dawn during the approach, a suicide plane crashed into Hinsdale (APA-120) and Southampton dispatched her landing craft to assist in the transfer of Hinsdale's troops to other ships. The next day, the task group made another feint at Okinawa. Before retiring to an area 150 miles from Okinawa, Southampton fired her guns at the enemy for the only time during the war. A Japanese plane flew over the formation and, though fired upon by all ships, escaped into the clouds apparently undamaged. The ships cruised around the holding area until 11 April. They encountered mines, underwent air alerts, and escort units made sonar contacts, but the group saw no action save the destruction of mines.

The task group returned to Saipan on 14 April, disembarked the marines, and unloaded its cargo. Southampton remained at Saipan until 4 June, when she was ordered to the South Pacific to pick up cargo for the Marianas. Over the following two and one-half months, she made two such voyages to the South Pacific and back to the Marianas. During the Nouméa to Kwajalein leg of the return voyage of her second run, she received news of the end of hostilities.

=== Post-war activities, 1945–1946 ===
Southampton departed Kwajalein on 18 August and reached Saipan on the 22nd. She discharged some of her cargo, sailed for Guam, and arrived there on 3 September. On the 9th, she sailed for the Philippines to embark elements of the 81st Infantry for passage to Japan. She arrived at Leyte on 12 September and, on the 18th, departed for Aomori. The attack cargo ship remained in Japan until 30 September, when she sailed for Leyte. En route, she was diverted to Tokyo Bay to avoid a typhoon and, on 3 October, her destination was changed to Manila where she arrived on the 14th. Following a return voyage to Tokyo Bay and Yokohama, Southampton embarked 264 servicemen and got underway on 11 November for San Francisco, California. Diverted to Portland, Oregon, while en route, she arrived there on the 23rd and remained almost two months for repairs and alterations.

Southampton stood out of Portland on 11 January 1946 and arrived in San Francisco on the 13th. There she loaded cargo and mail before heading west on the 27th. The attack cargo ship stopped at Eniwetok from 9 to 15 February to discharge cargo and arrived at Guam on the 18th. For almost a month, she discharged and loaded cargo at Guam. On 16 March, she headed back to San Francisco. Ten days later, her destination was changed to Port Hueneme, California. Southampton was at Port Hueneme for the first ten days of April before putting to sea on her final voyage. On 10 April, she headed south to the Canal Zone; transited the canal on the 20th; and arrived in Baltimore on the 27th.

=== Decommissioning and disposal ===
Southampton was decommissioned at St. Helena, Virginia, on 21 June 1946, and she was delivered to the War Shipping Administration for disposal on the 22nd. Her name was struck from the Navy List on 3 July 1946 and sold into civilian service with American Export-Isbrandtsen Lines. Her new owners renamed her SS Flying Clipper. She was finally sold for scrapping on 29 July 1971 to Chen Nan Steel and Iron Co., Taiwan.

== Awards ==
Southampton earned two battle stars during World War II.
