= USS Starr =

Cargo ship of the United States Navy

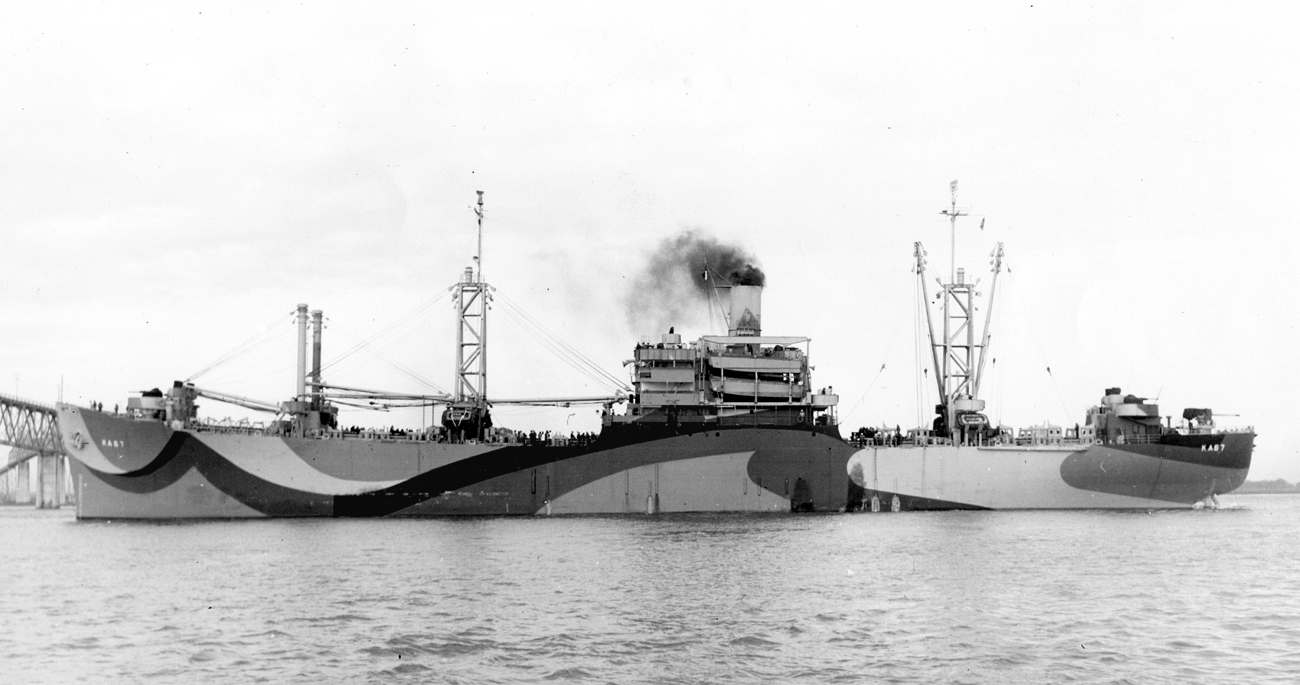

History

United States
- Name: USS Starr
- Namesake: Starr County, Texas
- Builder: North Carolina Shipbuilding Company, Wilmington, North Carolina
- Laid down: 13 June 1944
- Launched: 18 August 1944
- Commissioned: 29 September 1944
- Decommissioned: 31 May 1946
- Stricken: 19 June 1946
- Honors and awards: 2 battle stars (World War II)
- Fate: Sold into merchant service, 3 December 1947; Sold for scrapping, 9 September 1970

General characteristics
- Class & type: Tolland-class attack cargo ship
- Displacement: 8,635 long tons (8,774 t) light; 13,910 long tons (14,133 t) full
- Length: 459 ft 2 in (139.95 m)
- Beam: 63 ft (19 m)
- Draft: 26 ft 4 in (8.03 m)
- Propulsion: GE geared turbine drive, single propeller, 6,000 hp (4.5 MW)
- Speed: 16.5 knots (30.6 km/h; 19.0 mph)
- Boats & landing craft carried: 14 × LCVP; 8 × LCM
- Capacity: 380,000 ft^{3} (11.000 m³), 5,275 tons
- Complement: 62 officers, 333 men
- Armament: 1 × 5"/38 caliber gun; 4 × twin 40 mm guns; 16 × 20 mm guns

USS Starr (AKA-67) was a Tolland-class attack cargo ship in service with the United States Navy from 1944 to 1946. She was sold into commercial service and scrapped in 1970.

== History ==
Stokes was named for Starr County, Texas. Her keel was laid down as a Type C2-S-AJ3 ship on 13 June 1944 (as MC hull 1392), under Maritime Commission contract, by North Carolina Shipbuilding Company of Wilmington, North Carolina. She was launched on 18 August 1944, sponsored by Mrs. C. L. Griffin and acquired by the Navy from the War Shipping Administration on a bareboat charter; and was commissioned on 29 September 1944.

=== World War II, 1944–1945 ===
Starr completed fitting out at Charleston, South Carolina, and sailed on 31 October for the Chesapeake Bay on her shakedown cruise. After loading cargo, she stood out of Norfolk, Virginia, on 27 November and proceeded, via the Panama Canal, to the Pacific. She arrived at Pearl Harbor on 18 December 1944 and remained there until after Christmas. Starr participated in amphibious landing exercises during the first week of January and then entered Kahului Harbor, Maui, for combat loading.

Starr joined a large convoy and sailed west on 27 January, stopping at Eniwetok for two days, before proceeding to Saipan, where the Iwo Jima assault force was staging. The force cleared Tanapag Harbor on 16 February. At 0640 three days later, Starr launched her boats against the Iwo Jima beaches. The attack cargo ship had multiple duties: she was a receiving ship for wounded; an ammunition ship for Salt Lake City (CA-25); and she had a priority cargo of vehicles which were to be delivered only when requested and then, as quickly as possible. She waited until 25 February to begin discharging her cargo and finished on 5 March. She then got underway for Leyte.

Starr loaded combat cargo from 9 to 27 March and joined a convoy for the Ryukyu Islands. On 1 April, her first boats hit the water at 0615; and they soon joined their prearranged waves for hitting the Okinawa beaches. At 0420 on 9 April the ship was raked from stem to stern by an explosion. At first, it was thought that she had been torpedoed; but it was soon learned that she had been attacked by a Japanese Explosive Motor Boat (No. 326). The suicide boat had exploded as it contacted one of a cluster of Starr's landing craft that were moored alongside. The explosion was sufficiently removed from the side of the ship, and the water absorbed the shock so Starr suffered little damage.

Starr sailed for Guam on 10 April with a convoy and was routed onward to Pearl Harbor. She arrived there on 26 April and was notified that she was to return to the West Coast for overhaul. She arrived at San Pedro, Los Angeles, on 5 May; and repairs were begun immediately. When they were completed, the ship participated in an amphibious exercise and then loaded cargo at San Francisco, California, to be delivered to Guam. She sailed on 24 June and arrived at Guam on 11 July. On 20 July, she steamed to Pearl Harbor for another load of cargo for Guam. Starr was several days out of Guam when word was received that hostilities with Japan had ended.

=== Post-war activities, 1945–1946 ===
After discharging her cargo at Guam, the ship was routed to the Philippines on 2 September; she arrived at Leyte on 5 September. Starr operated in the Philippines until 29 November when she got underway for China and arrived at Tsingtao on 4 December 1945.

Starr sailed from China to Sasebo, Japan, and thence to Vladivostok. She arrived there on 2 January 1946, unloaded her cargo, and returned to Sasebo where she received orders to proceed, via San Diego, to San Francisco. She remained at San Francisco from 9 to 18 March and then got underway for Hampton Roads. Starr arrived at Norfolk, Virginia, on 4 April 1946; was decommissioned on 31 May 1946, and was returned to the War Shipping Administration on 1 June 1946. She was struck from the Naval Vessel Register on 19 June 1946.

=== In commercial service, 1947–1970 ===
As a civilian vessel, Starr was sold on 3 December 1947 to Pacific Far East Line, which changed her name to India Bear. In April 1957 she was sold to Trans-Pacific Company, who sold her in turn on 11 November 1959 to Dorama, Incorporated. On 10 July 1959 she was named Lanakila, and on 27 May 1960 she was sold to Long Island Tankers Corporation which renamed her India Bear. On 7 February 1961 she returned to Pacific Far East Line. Finally, on 9 September 1970, she was sold to Sing Cheng Yung Iron & Steel Company for scrapping in Taiwan.

== Awards ==
Starr received two battle stars for World War II service.
