= USS Towner =

Cargo ship of the United States Navy

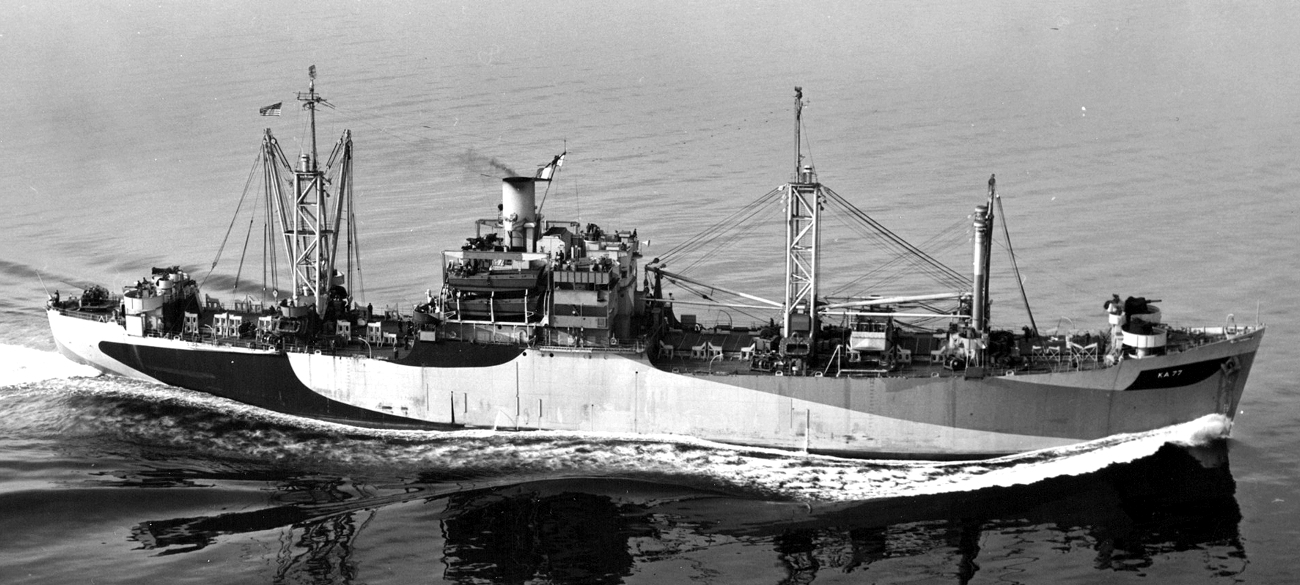

History

United States
- Name: USS Towner
- Namesake: Towner County, North Dakota
- Builder: North Carolina Shipbuilding Company, Wilmington, North Carolina
- Laid down: 8 April 1944
- Launched: 13 June 1944
- Commissioned: 3 December 1944
- Decommissioned: 10 June 1946
- Renamed: SS Philippine Bear; SS Kaimana; SS Guam Bear
- Stricken: 19 June 1946
- Fate: Sold for civilian use, abandoned July 1967 as a constructive total loss & scuttled.

General characteristics
- Class & type: Tolland-class attack cargo ship
- Displacement: 8,635 long tons (8,774 t) light; 13,910 long tons (14,133 t) full
- Length: 459 ft 2 in (139.95 m)
- Beam: 63 ft (19 m)
- Draft: 26 ft 4 in (8.03 m)
- Speed: 16.5 knots (30.6 km/h; 19.0 mph)
- Complement: 395
- Armament: 1 × 5"/38 caliber gun; 4 × twin 40 mm guns; 16 × single 20mm AA guns

USS Towner (AKA-77) was a Tolland-class attack cargo ship in service with the United States Navy from 1944 to 1946. She was sold into commercial service and was scuttled in 1967.

== History ==
Towner was named after Towner County, North Dakota. She was laid down as a Type C2-S-AJ3 ship under Maritime Commission contract (MC hull 1383) on 8 April 1944 at Wilmington, North Carolina, by the North Carolina Shipbuilding Co.; launched on 13 June 1944; sponsored by Mrs. Harold Broudy; acquired by the Navy from the War Shipping Administration on 27 June 1944; and commissioned on 3 December 1944.

=== World War II, 1944–1945 ===
Following shakedown training in the Chesapeake Bay area from 14 December to 23 December, the attack cargo ship loaded cargo at Bayonne, New Jersey, and, with Sheliak, got underway on 4 January 1945 for the Pacific. The two ships transited the Panama Canal on 10 January and headed for Hawaii the next day, arriving at Pearl Harbor on the 25th.

Towner stood out to sea again on 9 February bound for New Caledonia and arrived at Nouméa 10 days later. For the next two and one-half months, she made shuttle runs to Uarai Bay and participated in amphibious training exercises. In late April, Towner loaded elements of the 710th Tank Battalion and, with Transport Division 33, sortied on 3 May for the Philippines. She unloaded at Dulag on the 16th and reported to the 7th Fleet the following week. On 27 May, she sailed independently, via Hollandia, to Milne Bay to load a deck cargo of boats which she delivered to Manus. In early June, she loaded base hospital units at Lae for transportation to the Philippines and unloaded them at Manila on the 16th. From mid-June to mid-October, she shuttled troops and cargo from New Guinea to the Philippines.

=== Post-war activities, 1945 ===
On 26 August, Towner joined the Transport Division of the 3rd Amphibious Force at Cebu to assist in carrying troops and equipment of the Americal Division to Japan. The convoy sortied on 1 September and arrived at Yokohama a week later. Towner discharged her troops and cargo and was back in the Philippines on the 17th. In early October, she made another round-trip to Tokyo Bay. The cargo ship departed Leyte on 24 October and, after calling at Okinawa and Taku, arrived at Qingdao on 17 November. On 2 December 1945, Towner proceeded — via Guam, Guadalcanal, the Russell Islands, and Hawaii — to the United States.

=== Decommissioning ===
Towner arrived at Seattle on 25 January 1946 and entered the Bremerton Navy Yard for voyage repairs. She got underway for the east coast on 19 March and arrived at Norfolk on 10 April. Towner was decommissioned on 10 June 1946, returned to the War Shipping Administration on 13 June, and was struck from the Navy List on 19 June 1946 and sold for use as a civilian cargo vessel.

=== Civilian service and fate ===
After being sold by the Navy, ex-USS Towner was renamed (in succession) SS Philippine Bear, SS Kaimana, and SS Guam Bear. She served as a cargo ship for various carriers until July 1967 when (as Guam Bear in the service of Pacific Far East Lines) she was involved in a collision outside Apra Harbor, Guam. Judged a constructive total loss, the hulk was towed two nautical miles (3.7 km; 2.3 mi) off shore and scuttled.
