= USS Trego =

Cargo ship of the United States Navy

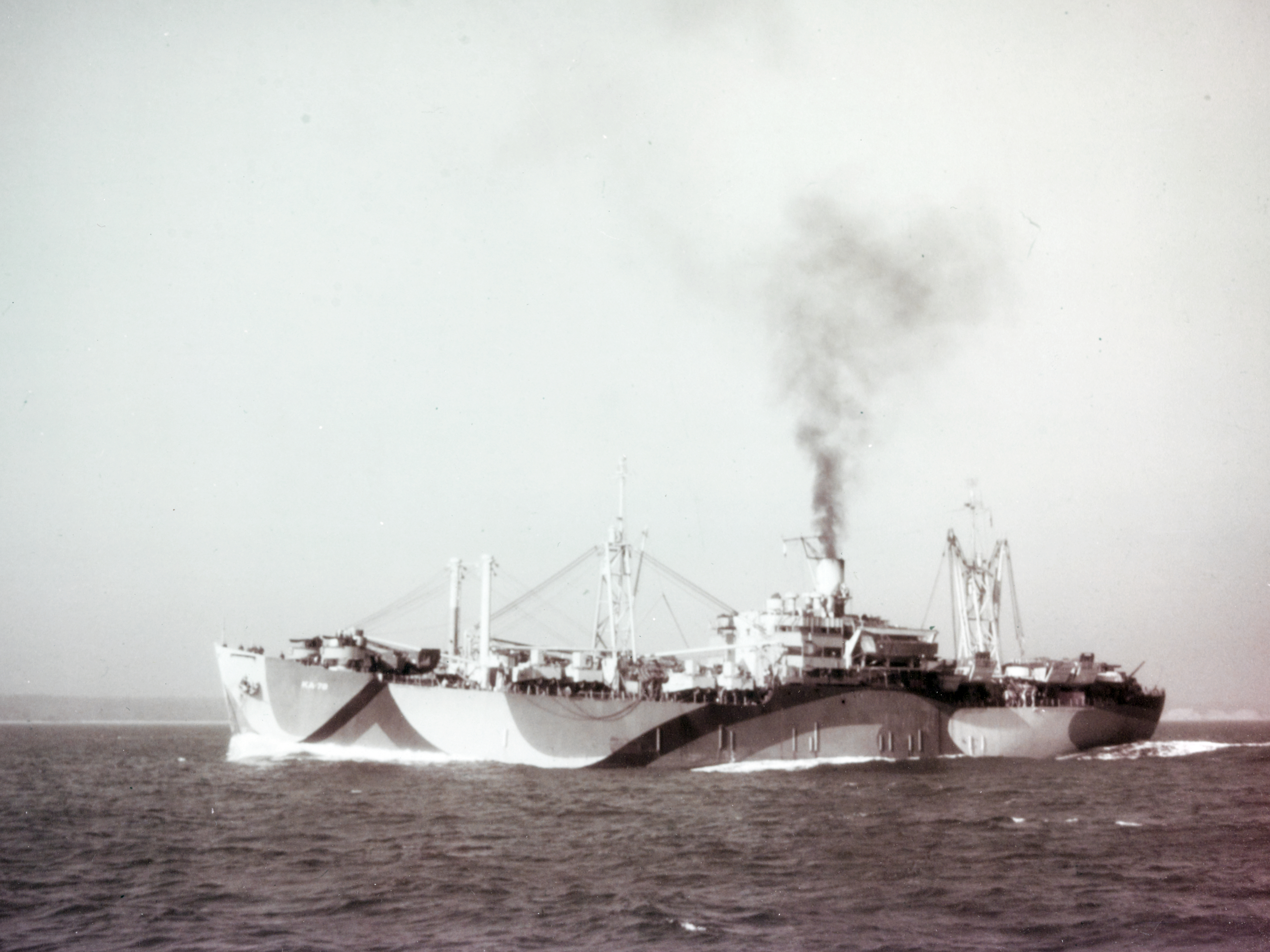

History

United States
- Name: USS Trego
- Namesake: Trego County, Kansas
- Builder: North Carolina Shipbuilding Company, Wilmington, North Carolina
- Laid down: 14 April 1944
- Launched: 20 June 1944
- Commissioned: 21 December 1944
- Decommissioned: 21 May 1946
- Renamed: SS Mason Lykes; SS Flower Hill
- Stricken: 5 June 1946
- Honors and awards: 1 battle star (World War II)
- Fate: Sold for merchant service, scrapped 27 October 1969

General characteristics
- Class & type: Tolland-class attack cargo ship
- Displacement: 13,910 long tons (14,133 t) full
- Length: 459 ft 2 in (139.95 m)
- Beam: 63 ft (19 m)
- Draft: 26 ft 4 in (8.03 m)
- Speed: 16.5 knots (30.6 km/h; 19.0 mph)
- Complement: 395
- Armament: 1 × 5"/38 caliber gun; 4 × twin 40 mm guns; 16 × 20 mm guns

USS Trego (AKA-78) was a Tolland-class attack cargo ship in service with the United States Navy from 1944 to 1946. She was sold into commercial service and was scrapped in 1969.

== History ==
Trego was named after Trego County, Kansas. She was laid down as a Type C2-S-AJ3 ship under United States Maritime Commission contract (MC hull 1384) on 14 April 1944 at Wilmington, North Carolina, by the North Carolina Shipbuilding Co.; launched on 20 June 1944; sponsored by Mrs. M. W. Nettles; acquired by the Navy on 4 July 1944; and commissioned on 21 December 1944.

=== World War II, 1945 ===
Trego held shakedown training at Oyster Bay in the Chesapeake/Maryland area in early February 1945. On the first night at anchor the radar operators on duty noticed the ship was drifting towards shore at about 4 knots (7.4 km/h; 4.6 mph). The Officer of the Deck was notified, but did not believe it. (Radar was new and its reliability was suspect by some). The Captain was woken and told. His response was the Officer of the Deck was in control of the ship. Again when told, the Officer of the Deck did not believe it, but at dawn he saw that the ship had drifted close to shore. The engine room was then accidentally signaled to go full speed ahead rather than reverse and the ship grounded at full speed within 15 feet of the shore. Two days later, tugs pulled the Trego off the beach. The ship was repaired at the Brooklyn Navy Yard, where 22 plates and the screw were replaced.

The attack cargo ship then loaded cargo at Norfolk. She stood out of Norfolk on 16 February bound for Hawaii, transited the Panama Canal on Washington's Birthday, and arrived at Pearl Harbor on 8 March. The ship unloaded; participated in training exercises for a week; discharged her landing craft; and on 31 March got underway for San Francisco to replace them and to load equipment for the 5th Marine Division which had just returned from Iwo Jima.

Trego discharged her cargo at Pearl Harbor on 19 April; loaded men and equipment of the 7th Air Force; and sailed on 2 May with a convoy bound, via Eniwetok and Ulithi, for Okinawa. After unloading her troops and supplies at the Hagushi beaches between 3 and 11 June, the ship returned to Pearl Harbor. On 19 July, she headed for Guam laden with maintenance equipment and arrived at Apra Harbor on 30 July. The following week, she got underway for the South Pacific; picked up equipment at Guadalcanal and at the Russell Islands; and delivered it back at Guam on the 29th.

=== Post-war activities, 1945–1946 ===
On 8 September, she headed for the Philippines to join Transport Squadron 20 of the 5th Amphibious Force. She and the other ships of the squadron embarked the entire 25th Infantry Division and sortied for Japan on 1 October. However, due to several typhoons, the convoy did not reach Nagoya until the 28th. The ships began unloading immediately and finished on 1 November. After disembarking their troops, the squadron disbanded; and Trego got underway on 2 November for the South Pacific. She called at Milne Bay on the 11th; at Manus in early December; at Batavia on 18 December 1945; and at Guam on 11 January 1946. On 18 January, the cargo ship headed for the United States and reached San Diego on 5 February.

=== Decommissioning ===
She stood put to sea on 29 March, bound for the east coast and inactivation. She arrived at Norfolk on 17 April. Decommissioned there on 21 May, Trego was returned to the War Shipping Administration the next day and was struck from the Navy List on 5 June 1946 and place in reserve with the James River Group of the reserve fleet at Lee Hall, Virginia.

=== Civilian Service and fate ===
Ex-USS Trego was sold to Lykes Brothers Steamship Company in 1946 but was not withdrawn from reserve until 27 January 1947. She was towed to Mobile, Alabama by Moran Towing & Transportation Co. On 9 July 1947 she was finally turned over to her new owners and renamed SS Mason Lykes. Lykes sold the ship to Ocean Freighting & Brokerage Corp (a.k.a. T.J. Stevensons Steamship Company) and she was renamed SS Flower Hill. She served under this name until 27 October 1969 when she was sold for the final time to Tung Tan Manufacturing of Taiwan and subsequently scrapped.

== Awards ==
Trego received one battle star for her service in World War II
