= USS Tolland =

Cargo ship of the United States Navy

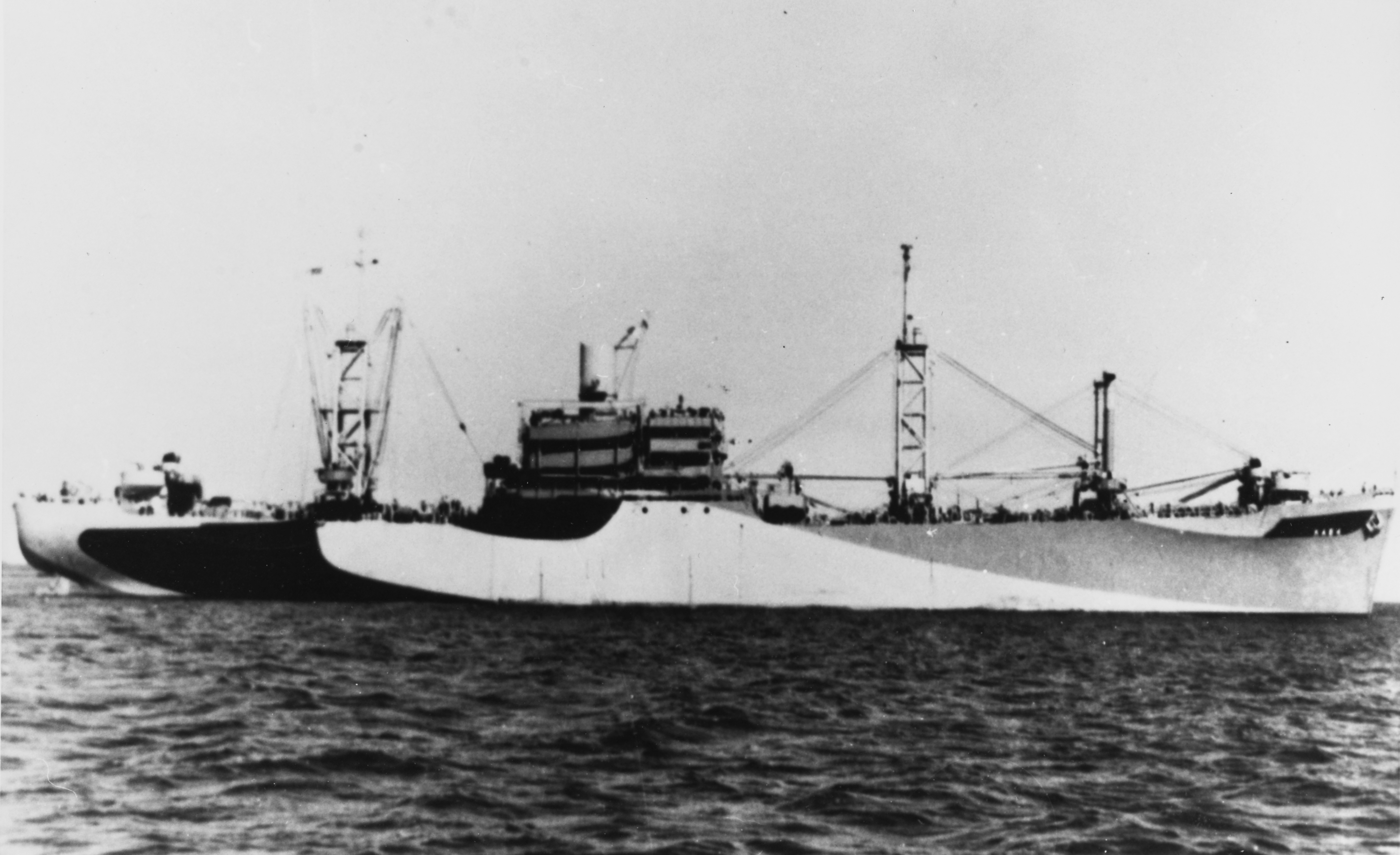

History

United States
- Name: USS Tolland
- Namesake: Tolland County, Connecticut
- Builder: North Carolina Shipbuilding Company, Wilmington, North Carolina
- Laid down: 22 April 1944
- Launched: 26 June 1944
- Commissioned: 4 September 1944
- Decommissioned: 1 July 1946
- Renamed: SS Edgar F. Luckenbach; SS Blue Grass State; SS Reliance Cordiality
- Stricken: 19 July 1946
- Identification: AKA-64
- Nickname(s): The Mighty "T"
- Honors and awards: 2 battle stars (World War II)
- Fate: Sold into merchant service 3 October 1947; Scrapped June 1971

General characteristics
- Class & type: Tolland-class attack cargo ship
- Displacement: 13,910 long tons (14,133 t) full
- Length: 459 ft 2 in (139.95 m)
- Beam: 63 ft (19 m)
- Draft: 26 ft 4 in (8.03 m)
- Depth of hold: 40 ft (12 m)
- Propulsion: General Electric geared steam turbine, single propeller
- Speed: 16.5 knots (30.6 km/h; 19.0 mph)
- Complement: 375
- Armament: 1 × 5"/38 caliber gun; 4 × twin 40 mm guns; 16 × 20 mm guns

USS Tolland (AKA-64) was the lead ship of her class of attack cargo ships of the United States Navy. Named after Tolland County, Connecticut, she was designed to carry military cargo and landing craft, and to use the latter to land weapons, supplies, and Marines on enemy shores during amphibious operations. USS Tolland served as a commissioned ship for 21 months.

Tolland was laid down as a Type C2-S-AJ3 ship under a Maritime Commission contract (MC hull 1385) on 22 April 1944 at Wilmington, N.C., by the North Carolina Shipbuilding Company; launched on 26 June 1944; sponsored by Miss Beverley Peebles; delivered to the Navy under loan-charter on 13 August 1944; and commissioned at Charleston, South Carolina, on 4 September 1944.

== Service history ==
=== World War II, 1944–1945 ===
Assigned to Task Group 29.7, Tolland departed Hampton Roads on 14 October bound for Hawaii, transited the Panama Canal on 21 October, and arrived at Pearl Harbor on 5 November.

The ship devoted the next month to amphibious maneuvers and exercises off Maui before heading back to the West Coast on 6 December and making port six days later. Returning to Pearl Harbor on 23 December, the ship spent Christmas and New Year's in Hawaiian waters before embarking on further training in preparation for combat operations across the Pacific.

The day and night exercises continued through the third week of January 1945 as the ship's crew honed its skills in cargo loading and unloading, boat-handling, and antiaircraft gunnery. Tolland got underway with Task Force 53 on 27 January, bound for Eniwetok with marines of the 5th Marine Division and a construction battalion or Seabee unit embarked.

Following brief stops at Eniwetok and Saipan, Tolland anchored off Iwo Jima on 19 February to commence ten days of unloading. After the initial landings had been blessed with good weather, rough tides hampered subsequent support operations. In spite of these natural impediments, the operations proceeded. In the vicious tidal conditions on the steep beaches, three of the ship's LCVP's and one LCM sank, but the men on board were saved. One unmanned amphibious craft struck the propeller, and a Japanese shell clipped a radio antenna for the ship's only damage. Twenty-five marines, wounded on shore in heavy fighting with the fanatical Japanese defenders, were evacuated to the ship for medical treatment while the ship lay to off the beachhead.

The stars and stripes flew proudly over Mount Suribachi as Marine forces secured the island after bitter fighting. Tolland and her companion AKA's in the squadron left the Bonins for a period of waiting, training, provisioning, and repairs, while American forces marshalled for the assault on an island one step closer to the Japanese homeland itself — Okinawa. Drydocked at Espiritu Santo late in February, Tolland then combat-loaded elements of the Army 27th Division and cleared the New Hebrides on 1 April 1945, bound for the Ryūkyūs.

With Kerama Retto secured earlier in the Okinawa campaign, Tolland put in on 9 April and anchored as a floating reserve with Task Force 53. American forces endured terrific air attacks from the Japanese defenders, now nearly reduced to this last island defense post on their very doorstep. The attack cargo ship's crew stood to general quarters for hours at a time — night and day — some sleeping and eating at their stations during lulls in the action, to be so many steps closer to their guns at the sound of the alarm. In one of the 22 air attacks encountered during her eight-day deployment off Okinawa, Tolland's guns downed a Japanese "Betty" bomber on 12 April. On 15 April, an "Oscar" flew low over the transport area, attracting fire and spinning into the sea in flames as Tolland and other ships shared the kill.

Departing from the Ryūkyūs on 16 April, Tolland proceeded via Saipan to Ulithi and engaged in nearly continuous exercises and drills through 14 May, when she was ordered to Angaur in the Palau Islands. Loading heavy guns soon after her arrival, she set out for the Philippines, to off-load her cargo at Cebu on 24 May, before moving to Subic Bay and anchoring there for three weeks of upkeep and training.

Subsequent to her rest period at Subic Bay, the ship proceeded to Manila where she remained from 22 June to 28 June. She then steamed to Leyte where she embarked troops, vehicles, and equipment of the Army 323d Division for amphibious training.

By this time, preparations for the invasion of Japan were proceeding apace. Estimates of fanatical and suicidal Japanese resistance projected astronomical casualties for both defender and invader alike, with untold devastation forecast. Accordingly, heavy air attacks by American B-29's pounded key Japanese targets while units of the American and British Navies steamed often close inshore, bombarding coastline targets.

The entire month of July found Tolland and her sisters engaged in training for the projected invasion of Japan, conducting exercises in Subic Bay and Lingayen Gulf. While the attack transport was at Lingayen, word came that American B-29's had dropped atomic bombs on Hiroshima and Nagasaki. Now hardpressed on all sides and hemmed in by armadas of sea and air forces, Japan capitulated on 15 August 1945.

After a brief stop at Subic Bay from 17 August to 19 August, Tolland proceeded to Batangas Bay, Luzon, on the 20th and then moved on to Tokyo where she was present when Japanese representatives signed the formal articles of surrender on the deck of battleship USS Missouri.

=== Post-war activities, 1945–1946 ===
Returning to the Philippines, the ship arrived at Zamboanga on 2 September, where she embarked units of the Army's 41st Division for transportation to Kure, Japan, for duty with the Allied occupation forces. Provisioning at Manila after delivering the Army troops, she embarked elements of the Chinese 52nd Army at Tonkin Gulf, French Indochina, and transported them to Chinwangtao, China, at the base of the Great Wall.

On 14 November, Tolland departed Taku, China, and pointed her bow toward home, arriving at Seattle on 20 November 1945 as Task Unit 78.19.6, and remaining in the Pacific northwest until 28 February 1946, when the ship departed for Port Hueneme.

On 11 March 1946, with cargo loaded on board earmarked for Guam, Tolland departed the West Coast. She arrived at Apra Harbor on 27 March and remained there until 20 April when she departed for Panama. Making port at Balboa on 13 May, she transited the Panama Canal and reported to Commander in Chief, Atlantic Fleet, for duty on 14 May. Departing Panamanian waters on the 16th, she proceeded for Hampton Roads and arrived at Norfolk on 21 May.

=== Decommissioning and sale ===
Tolland was decommissioned on 1 July 1946 and returned to the War Shipping Administration on 2 July. Seventeen days later, on 19 July 1946, her name was struck from the Navy List.

Acquired by the Luckenbach Steamship Co she was renamed SS Edgar F. Luckenbach on 3 October 1947 and served under this company's flag into the second half of 1959 until purchased in October 1959 by States Marine Line and renamed SS Blue Grass State. After carrying cargo for States Marine for eleven years, she was sold on 6 November 1970, renamed SS Reliance Cordiality and reflagged Panamanian. Less than a year later she was sold for the final time as scrap and broken up at Kaohsiung, Taiwan beginning in June 1971.

== Awards ==
Tolland received two battle stars for her World War II service at Iwo Jima and Okinawa.
