= USS Woodford =

Cargo ship of the United States Navy

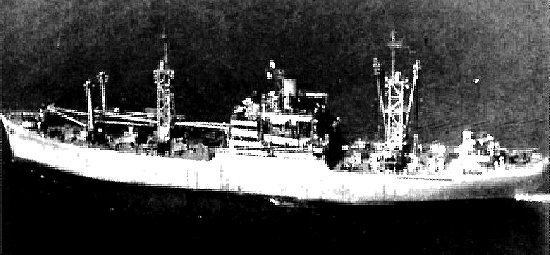

History

United States
- Name: USS Woodford
- Namesake: Woodford County, Illinois; Woodford County, Kentucky
- Builder: North Carolina Shipbuilding Company, Wilmington, North Carolina
- Laid down: 17 July 1944
- Launched: 5 October 1944
- Commissioned: 3 March 1945
- Decommissioned: 1 May 1946
- Renamed: SS Suzanne; SS Rappahannock
- Stricken: 8 May 1946
- Fate: Sold into merchant service, 31 October 1947; Scrapped, 19 May 1973

General characteristics
- Class & type: Tolland-class attack cargo ship
- Displacement: 13,910 long tons (14,133 t) full
- Length: 459 ft 2 in (139.95 m)
- Beam: 63 ft (19 m)
- Draft: 26 ft 4 in (8.03 m)
- Speed: 16.5 knots (30.6 km/h; 19.0 mph)
- Complement: 395
- Armament: 1 × 5"/38 caliber gun; 4 × twin 40 mm guns; 16 × 20 mm guns

USS Woodford (AKA-86) was a Tolland-class attack cargo ship in service with the United States Navy from 1945 to 1946. She was sold into commercial service and was scrapped in 1973.

== History ==
Woodford was named after counties in Illinois and Kentucky. She was laid down as a Type C2-S-AJ3 ship under a Maritime Commission contract (MC hull 1399) on 17 July 1944 at Wilmington, North Carolina, by the North Carolina Shipbuilding Company; launched on 5 October 1944; sponsored by Mrs. Ruth E. McInnis, the wife of J. Frank McInnis who was in charge of the construction of all Maritime Commission ships built on the east coast; and placed in service on 19 October. The merchant tug Rescue towed Woodford to Hoboken, N.J., to be converted at the Todd Shipyard Corp. for Navy service. She was commissioned at the Todd Shipyard on 3 March 1945.

=== World War II, 1945 ===
After initial trials in Long Island Sound, shakedown in Chesapeake Bay, post-shakedown availability at the Norfolk Navy Yard, further shakedown trials, and another availability, Woodford reported at the Naval Operating Base (NOB), Norfolk, on 19 April to take on her first cargo. When loaded, the attack cargo ship got underway on 28 April and headed for the Panama Canal, on the first leg of her voyage to the Pacific.

Woodford's passage, in company with her escort, the high speed transport Runels (APD-85), was uneventful until early on 1 May, when Runels made a sound contact. While her escort sought to develop the contact, the Woodford went to general quarters and commenced evasive action. Later, both ships stood down from quarters when Runels lost the contact and could not regain it.

Woodford transited the Panama Canal on 3 May and spent two days at Balboa before heading for Pearl Harbor in company with the submarines Runner (SS-476), Moray (SS-300), and Carp (SS-338). While en route, the ships conducted joint exercises, exchanging officers between the ships at various intervals to enable them to each observe the drills from a different perspective.

Also, while en route, the ships received the news that President Harry S. Truman had declared 8 May 1945 as "V-E Day", marking the victorious conclusion of the war with Germany. As Woodford's commanding officer recounted, "While the stirring news was received on board Woodford with joy, the joy was tinged with the thought that, after all, a terrific job lay ahead."

Woodford ultimately reached Pearl Harbor on 20 May where she discharged her cargo. A week later, she shifted to Honolulu where she took on a cargo tabbed as "high priority" – ammunition earmarked for the 10th Army at Okinawa. Once loaded, Woodford set out independently for the Marshalls on 2 June but, en route, was rerouted to the Carolines.

Reaching Ulithi on 14 June, Woodford subsequently joined Convoy UOK-27 headed for Okinawa, but was again rerouted – this time to Kerama Retto, to await orders for discharge of her "high priority" cargo. For three weeks, from 24 June to 15 July, the attack cargo ship – her ammunition cargo still in her holds – lay in the roadstead of that group of small islands. During her stay, she went to general quarters 21 times because of alerts or actual enemy attacks – an uncomfortable situation for a ship laden with ammunition.

Finally, orders came – but not to unload at either Okinawa or Kerama Retto. Instead, Woodford was directed to retire to the Marianas and unload at Guam. The attack cargo ship weighed anchor at Kerama Retto on 15 July and proceeded toward the Marianas with Convoy OKS-14. Reaching Saipan on the 21st, Woodford proceeded independently toward Guam one week later and anchored in Agana Bay on the 29th. There, transferring her ammunition into amphibious trucks (DUKW's), Woodford at long last discharged her dangerous cargo.

Upon completion of the unloading, the attack cargo ship immediately returned to Saipan to await further orders. There, at 0900 on 15 August, Woodford received word that the Japanese had capitulated. Pandemonium then reigned in the anchorage. Woodford's commanding officer recounted that "whistles and sirens sounded in blasts of raucous joy, drowning out the glad shouts that went up from thousands of men."

=== Post-war activities, 1945–1946 ===
Two days after the capitulation, Woodford sailed for the Philippines and reached Leyte on the 20th. There, she joined Transport Squadron (TransRon) 13, Transport Division (TransDiv) 53. Shifting to Cebu soon thereafter, TransRon 13 loaded the men and equipment of the Americal Division – part of the force slated to occupy the former enemy's capital.

Woodford and her consorts subsequently sailed for Tokyo Bay, reaching that body of water on 8 September 1945 – six days after the formal Japanese surrender ceremony on board the battleship Missouri. She disembarked her troops and discharged her cargo before she returned to the Philippines with TransDiv 53. Upon arriving back at Leyte on 16 September, the ship detached her first group of homeward-bound sailors eligible for discharges before getting underway to proceed independently to Cebu to commence taking on board troops before the arrival of the rest of TransDiv 53.

Combat-loaded with the men and equipment of the Army's 77th Division, Woodford returned to Japanese waters with TransDiv 53 and carried those troops and their equipment to Otaru, on the island of Hokkaidō, arriving there on 5 October. Upon completion of that operation, she returned to the Philippines.

Woodford remained in the Far East into December. Between 27 October and 4 November, she lifted rear elements of the 3rd Amphibious Corps – the 30th Construction Battalion (SeaBees) and the 32nd Special Construction Battalion – from San Pedro Bay, Leyte, to Taku, China, in company with TransDiv 37, before proceeding singly to Guam to discharge cargo. From there, on 4 December, she proceeded to Sasebo, on the island of Kyūshū, Japan.

Steaming into Sasebo harbor on 8 December, the ship anchored there until the 10th, when she went alongside a dock. There, she embarked elements of the 5th Marine Division and their equipment to be transported to the west coast of the United States. The ship's departure from the Far East, however, was not without elements of a "Hollywood thriller." Intelligence officers had uncovered what they thought to be Japanese sabotage plans which had tabbed Woodford with destruction after midnight on 13 December. Taking no chances that the discovery was a hoax, Woodford accordingly doubled the watch, manned her guns and searchlights, and broke out carbines and Thompson submachine guns. As the ship's commanding officer later reported: "The cost of the all-night vigil was happily no more, however, then a loss of sleep for all hands; not a shot was fired nor a saboteur discovered."

At 1100 on 14 December, with a homeward-bound pennant at the gaff, Woodford stood put to sea to begin the 6,047-mile passage to San Diego; and she reached her destination on the last day of 1945. After discharging cargo and disembarking her passengers, Woodford underwent voyage repairs at San Francisco into February 1946 before she sailed for the east coast of the United States.

=== Decommissioning and fate ===
After transiting the Panama Canal, she made port at Norfolk on 25 February. Woodford shifted briefly to New York City before she returned to Norfolk on 7 March to be inactivated in the 5th Naval District; on 1 May 1946 Woodford was decommissioned. One week later, on 8 May, her name was struck from the Navy List on 10 May; and she was returned to the War Shipping Administration (WSA) of the Maritime Commission and berthed in reserve with many of her sisters at the James River Group of the reserve fleet.

Ex-USS Woodford was acquired from the Maritime Administration by the A. H. Bull Steamship Co. of New York City on 31 October 1947 and renamed SS Suzanne. Acquired by the Westmount Shipping Co. (also of New York) on 14 December 1965 and renamed SS Rappahannock, the ship performed general cargo-carrying services into 1973. On 19 May 1973 she was sold for the final time to Sing Cheng Yung Iron & Steel of Taiwan and broken up for scrap.
