= USS Tate =

Cargo ship of the United States Navy

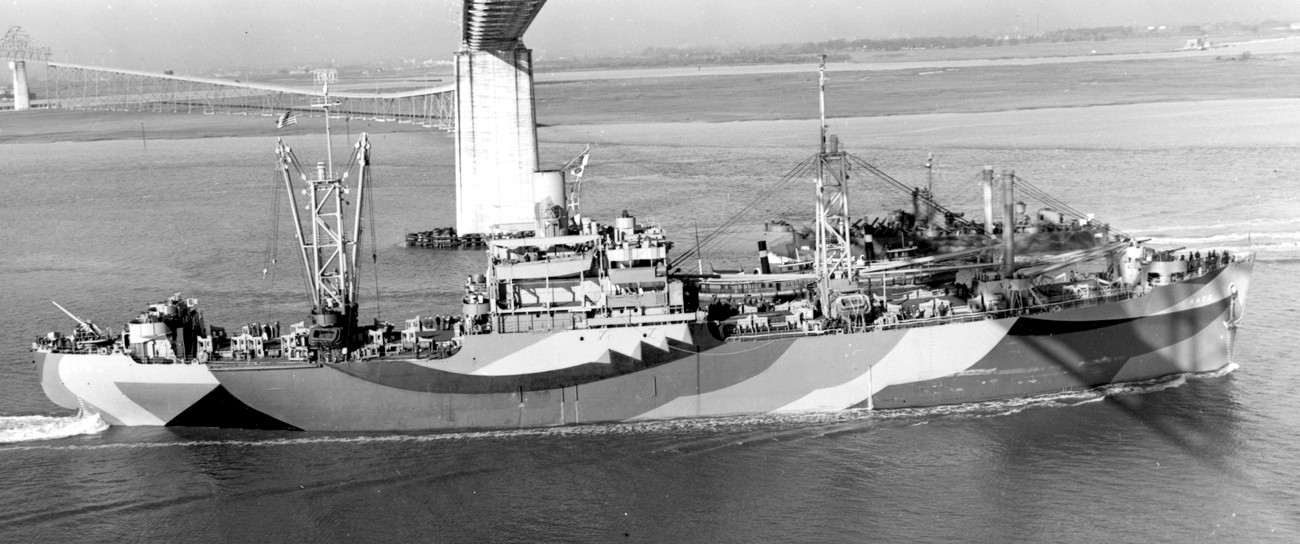

History

United States
- Name: USS Tate
- Namesake: Tate County, Mississippi
- Builder: North Carolina Shipbuilding Company, Wilmington, North Carolina
- Laid down: 22 July 1944
- Launched: 26 September 1944
- Commissioned: 25 November 1944
- Decommissioned: 10 July 1946
- Renamed: SS Julia Luckenbach; SS Bay State
- Stricken: 19 July 1946
- Honors and awards: 1 battle star (World War II)
- Fate: Sold into merchant service, scrapped October 1970

General characteristics
- Class & type: Tolland-class attack cargo ship
- Displacement: 13,910 long tons (14,133 t) full
- Length: 459 ft 2 in (139.95 m)
- Beam: 63 ft (19 m)
- Draft: 26 ft 4 in (8.03 m)
- Propulsion: General Electric geared turbine drive 6,000shp, single propeller
- Speed: 16.5 knots (30.6 km/h; 19.0 mph)
- Complement: 395
- Armament: 1 × 5"/38 caliber gun; 4 × twin 40 mm guns; 16 × single 20 mm AA gun mounts

USS Tate (AKA-70) was a Tolland-class attack cargo ship in service with the United States Navy from 1944 to 1946. She was sold into commercial service and was scrapped in 1970.

== History ==
Tate was named after Tate County, Mississippi. She was laid down as a Type C2-S-AJ3 ship under a United States Maritime Commission contract (MC hull 1398) on 22 July 1944 at Wilmington, North Carolina, by the North Carolina Shipbuilding Co.; launched on 26 September 1944; sponsored by Mrs. C. E. Tate; delivered to the Navy on loan-charter on 3 November 1944; and commissioned at Charleston, South Carolina, on 25 November 1944.

=== World War II, 1944–1945 ===
The attack transport completed shakedown training in the Chesapeake Bay early in December and steamed to Davisville, Rhode Island, to load Hawaii-bound cargo. She headed south on 30 December, transited the Panama Canal between 4 and 6 January 1945, and reached Pearl Harbor on the 18th. She remained in the Hawaiian Islands until 31 January when she departed Port Allen, Kauai Island, for the Marshall Islands.

Tate reached Eniwetok on 4 February and joined Transport Squadron 17, which soon departed for the Philippines. Proceeding via Ulithi Atoll and Kossol Roads, she reached Leyte Gulf on 21 February and made a shuttle to Samar Island to discharge cargo and disembark passengers before beginning preparations for the upcoming invasion of Okinawa. After training for the assault, she combat-loaded the men and equipment of the Army's 77th Infantry Division at Tarranguna, Leyte, and on 21 March departed the Philippines with the Western Islands Attack Group. Her destination was Kerama Retto, a small group of islands located to the south and west of Okinawa, which became the fleet's steppingstone to Okinawa itself. Her soldiers and equipment went into action against the islands of Aka Shima, Kuba Shima, Yakabi Shima, and Zamami Shima. By the afternoon of 28 March, the islands of Kerama Retto were secured, and Tate joined the other ships in a waiting area.

The attack transport remained in the vicinity of Okinawa through three weeks of April, also participating in the assault on Ie Shima during her last week in the area. On the 22nd, she headed for the Marianas, arriving at Saipan on 27 April. Five days later, she headed for the Solomon Islands. Tate loaded marines and cargo at Guadalcanal and Tulagi between 8 and 17 May before heading back, via Eniwetok, to the Marianas. Reaching Guam on 4 June, she disembarked the marines and discharged her cargo. On the 13th, the attack transport got underway for the United States.

On 25 July, Tate steamed out of San Francisco Bay to return to the combat zone. Stopping at Eniwetok from 5 to 10 August, she reached Guam on the 14th, the day before the cessation of hostilities.

=== Post-war activities, 1945–1946 ===
From there, she headed for Ulithi and thence, via Okinawa, to Jinsen, Korea, for occupation duty. Tate returned to the Philippines early in October, visiting Manila and Subic Bay. After stops at Qingdao, China, and Okinawa in late November, the attack transport steamed back to the United States, arriving at Seattle on 13 December. She remained there until 26 February 1946, when she got underway for San Francisco. The ship loaded cargo between 1 and 16 March and then headed for Eniwetok and Kwajalein.

She discharged her cargo at the two atolls and got underway for Panama on 4 April. Tate reached the Canal Zone on 23 April; but, instead of entering the canal, she remained on the Pacific side to help in the final removal of Americans from the air base at Seymour Island in the Galapagos. She returned to Balboa on 20 May, transited the canal, and reached Hampton Roads on 28 May.

=== Decommissioning and sale ===
Tate was decommissioned on 10 July 1946 and, three days later, was returned to the War Shipping Administration. Her name was struck from the Navy List on 19 July 1946. Sometime between then and 1948, she was purchased by the Luckenbach Steamship Co. of New York City and served that line as SS Julia Luckenbach until 1958. No record was found for the year 1959, but sometime in 1960 she was sold to States Marine Lines and renamed SS Bay State. She served there for ten years until being sold for scrap in October 1970.

== Awards ==
Tate was awarded one battle star for World War II service.
