= USS Suffolk =

Cargo ship of the United States Navy

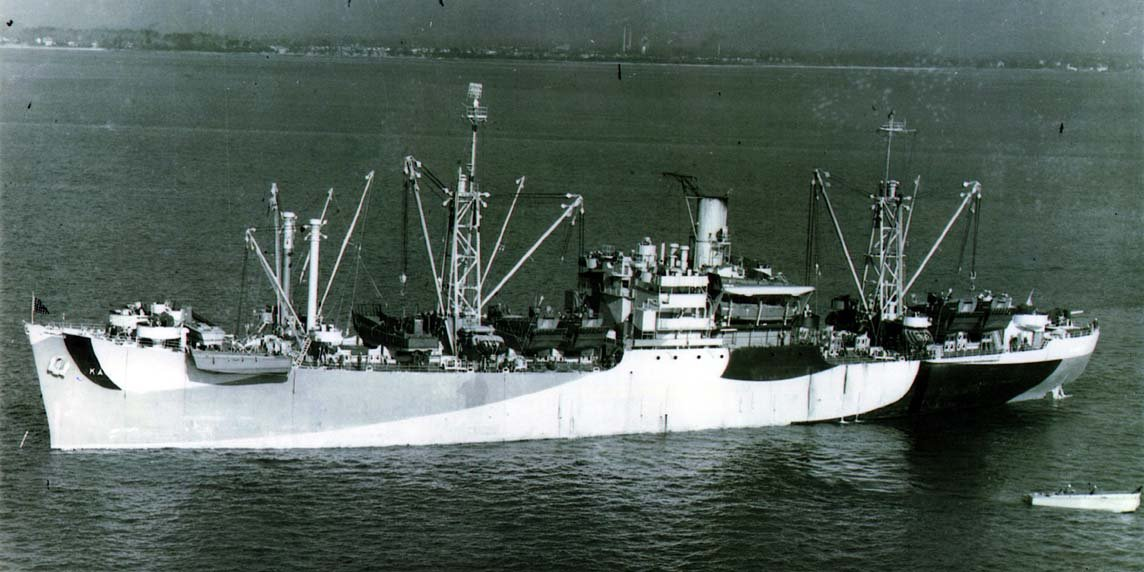

History

United States
- Name: USS Suffolk
- Namesake: Suffolk County, Massachusetts; Suffolk County, New York
- Builder: North Carolina Shipbuilding Company, Wilmington, North Carolina
- Laid down: 11 July 1944
- Launched: 15 September 1944
- Commissioned: 23 October 1944
- Decommissioned: 27 June 1946
- Renamed: SS Southport; SS American Retailer; SS Alcoa Master; SS Columbia Star; SS Antillian Star
- Stricken: 19 July 1946
- Honors and awards: 1 battle star (World War II)
- Fate: Scrapped in Taiwan, 1971

General characteristics
- Class & type: Tolland-class attack cargo ship
- Displacement: 13,910 long tons (14,133 t) full
- Length: 459 ft 2 in (139.95 m)
- Beam: 63 ft (19 m)
- Draft: 26 ft 4 in (8.03 m)
- Propulsion: General Electric Geared Turbine; 6,000shp; Single Screw
- Speed: 16.5 knots (30.6 km/h; 19.0 mph)
- Complement: 395
- Armament: 1 × 5"/38 caliber gun; 4 × Twin 40 mm guns; 16 × Single 20 mm AA gun mounts

USS Suffolk (AKA-69) was a Tolland-class attack cargo ship in service with the United States Navy from 1944 to 1946. She was sold into commercial service and was scrapped in 1971.

== History ==
Suffolk (MC hull 1396) was named after counties in Massachusetts and New York. She was laid down on as a Type C2-S-AJ3 ship on 11 July 1944 by the North Carolina Shipbuilding Company, Wilmington, North Carolina; launched on 15 September 1944; sponsored by Mrs. W. T. Dixon; and commissioned on 23 October 1944.

== Service history ==
=== World War II, 1944–1945 ===
Suffolk, after outfitting, got underway for the Charleston Navy Yard where she was depermed on 19 November and, on the 25th, began her shakedown cruise in the Chesapeake Bay. After a post-shakedown availability period, she sailed for the Panama Canal Zone on 11 December and arrived at San Francisco on 29 December 1944. She loaded cargo on 10 January 1945 and sailed the following week for Manus, Admiralty Islands.

Suffolk arrived at Seeadler Harbor on 3 February, discharged part of her cargo and proceeded on to New Guinea, arriving at Hollandia on the 7th. She embarked naval beach party personnel and sailed for the Philippines on 9 February. Her passengers were disembarked at Leyte on the 17th, and the cargo was offloaded at Samar between 19 February and 3 March. She returned to Leyte where she combat-loaded troops and cargo.

Suffolk sortied with Task Group (TG) 51.1, the Western Islands Attack Force, on 21 March for Kerama Retto. She arrived there four days later, and Army troops landed on 26 March. The ships were under almost daily air attack and, on 2 April, Henrico (APA-45) was crashed by a kamikaze. Henrico lost all power. A tow line was passed to her by the crew of Suffolk and then towed to comparative safety at Kerama Retto. Suffolk remained at Okinawa until 30 April when she got underway for Saipan. She was ordered to return to the United States via Eniwetok and Pearl Harbor.

Suffolk arrived at San Francisco on 24 May and proceeded to Seattle for repairs and loading. On 16 June she stood out to sea, en route to Eniwetok, Saipan, and the Bonin Islands, arriving at Iwo Jima on 7 July. All cargo was discharged within three days, and the ship headed back to San Francisco, arriving on 26 July. Japan ceased hostilities on 14 August, but the cargo ship continued loading passengers and cargo. She stood out of San Francisco on 20 August and steamed to the New Hebrides Islands.

=== Post-war activities, 1945–1946 ===
Suffolk arrived at Espiritu Santo on 4 September; discharged cargo and passengers; and sailed for Leyte on the 6th. She arrived there on 15 September, and loaded troops and cargo destined for Hokkaidō, Japan. Suffolk departed the Philippines on 26 September and arrived at Otaru, Hokkaidō, on 5 October; disembarked her troops; and departed for Guam the next day.

Suffolk loaded elements of the 6th Marine Division at Guam and sailed, on 22 October, with Transport Division 35 for China. Qingdao was reached on 28 October. The ship remained there until 4 November when she was ordered to return to the United States, via Okinawa. She arrived at Portland, Oregon where she landed her passengers before proceeding to the east coast.

=== Decommissioning and civilian service ===
She reported to the 5th Naval District in March 1946 for layup with the reserve fleet in the James River. Suffolk was decommissioned on 27 June, returned to the War Shipping Administration on 28 June, and struck from the Navy List on 19 July 1946. Ex-USS Suffolk was sold by the Maritime Administration for commercial service in 1947 and renamed SS Southport. United States Lines acquired the ship in 1961 and renamed her SS American Retailer. Sold to the Alcoa Steamship Company, she was rechristened as SS Alcoa Master. In the years that followed she was resold and renamed SS Columbia Star and then SS Antillian Star. The ship was sold for the last time in 1971 and scrapped at Kaohsiung, Taiwan.

== Awards ==
Suffolk received one battle star for her service in World War II.
