= USS Caswell =

Cargo ship of the United States Navy

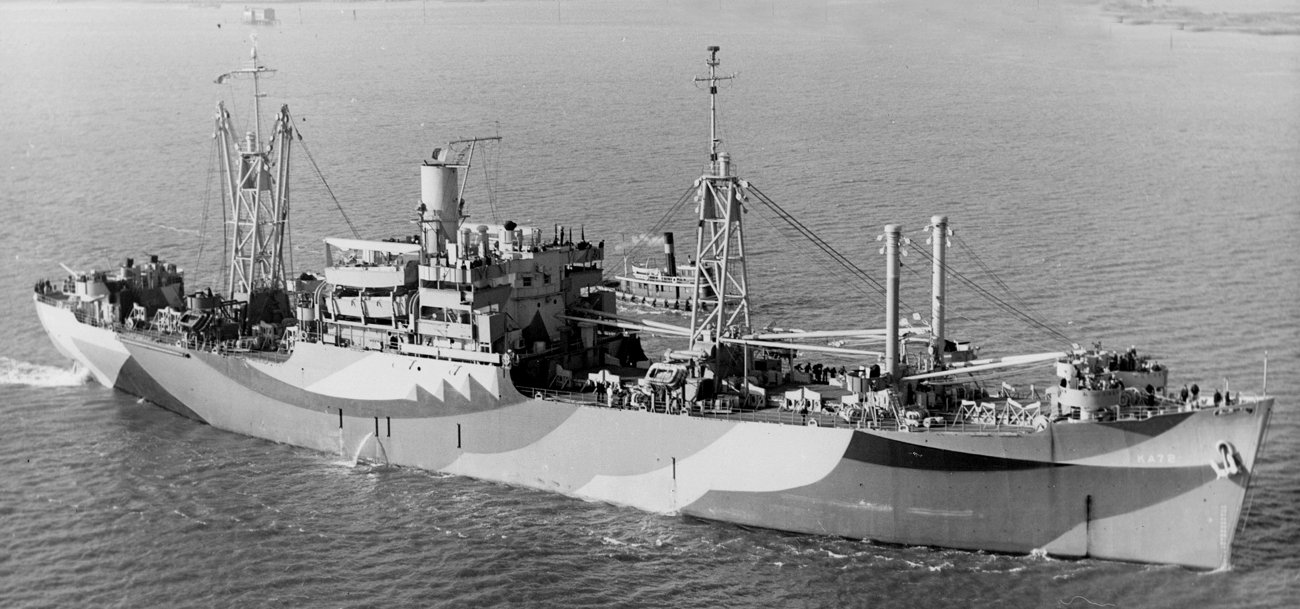

History

United States
- Name: USS Caswell
- Namesake: Caswell County, North Carolina
- Builder: North Carolina Shipbuilding Company, Wilmington, North Carolina
- Launched: 24 October 1944
- Acquired: 27 November 1944
- Commissioned: 13 December 1944
- Decommissioned: 19 June 1946
- Renamed: SS Southwind; SS American Surveyor
- Honors and awards: 1 battle star (World War II)
- Fate: Sold into merchant service, 23 June 1947; Sold for scrapping, 10 August 1973

General characteristics
- Class & type: Tolland-class attack cargo ship
- Displacement: 6,318 long tons (6,419 t)
- Length: 459 ft 2 in (139.95 m)
- Beam: 63 ft (19 m)
- Draft: 26 ft 4 in (8.03 m)
- Propulsion: GE geared turbine drive, single propeller, 6,000 hp (4,474 kW)
- Speed: 16.5 knots (30.6 km/h; 19.0 mph)
- Range: 17,000 miles
- Boats & landing craft carried: 14 × LCVP; 8 × LCM
- Capacity: 380,000 ft^{3} (11.000 m³), 5,275 tons
- Complement: 395
- Armament: 1 × 5"/38 caliber gun; 4 × twin 40 mm guns; 16 × 20 mm guns

USS Caswell (AKA-72) was a Tolland-class attack cargo ship in service with the United States Navy from 1944 to 1946. She was sold into commercial service and was scrapped in 1973.

== History ==
Caswell, a Type C2-S-AJ3 ship, was named after Caswell County, North Carolina. She was launched on 24 October 1944 by North Carolina Shipbuilding Co., Wilmington, North Carolina, under a United States Maritime Commission contract; sponsored by Mrs. W. H. Williamson; acquired by the Navy on 27 November 1944; and commissioned on 13 December 1944.

=== World War II, 1944–1945 ===
Caswell cleared Bayonne, New Jersey, on 16 January 1945 for the Panama Canal and Guadalcanal, arriving on 14 February. A month of training preceded her departure combat-loaded for the Okinawa beaches. Sailing with the Northern Attack Force, Caswell arrived for the initial landings on 1 April, and remained off the beaches for the next week, landing cargo to support the 6th Marines in their rapid advance across the Motobu Peninsula. The skillful work of her men made an important contribution to this success, and she cleared Okinawa on 9 April for overhaul and replenishment at Pearl Harbor.

=== Post-war activities, 1945–1946 ===
Returning to the West Coast, Caswell loaded cargo for Okinawa, where she arrived on 5 August to begin a series of cargo and troop movements throughout the Far East, calling at ports in the Philippines, China, and Japan until 7 December, when she cleared Sasebo for San Diego. Between 23 February and 2 May 1946, Caswell carried cargo from San Francisco to China.

=== Decommissioning ===
Returning to Norfolk, Virginia, she was decommissioned on 19 June 1946. Caswell was returned to the Maritime Commission two days later.

=== Civilian service and fate ===
Ex-USS Caswell was sold on 23 June 1947 to the South Atlantic Steamship Line and renamed SS Southwind and served under that name for about 12 years. She was sold to United States Lines sometime in 1955 and later renamed by that company SS American Surveyor (18 May 1961). After a little more than two years, she was returned to the Maritime Administration for layup in the James River Group of the National Defense Reserve Fleet. On 10 August 1973 she was sold to Northern Metal Company for 'non-transportation use' and (presumably) scrapped shortly thereafter.

== Awards ==
Caswell received one battle star for World War II service.
