= USS Stokes =

Cargo ship of the United States Navy

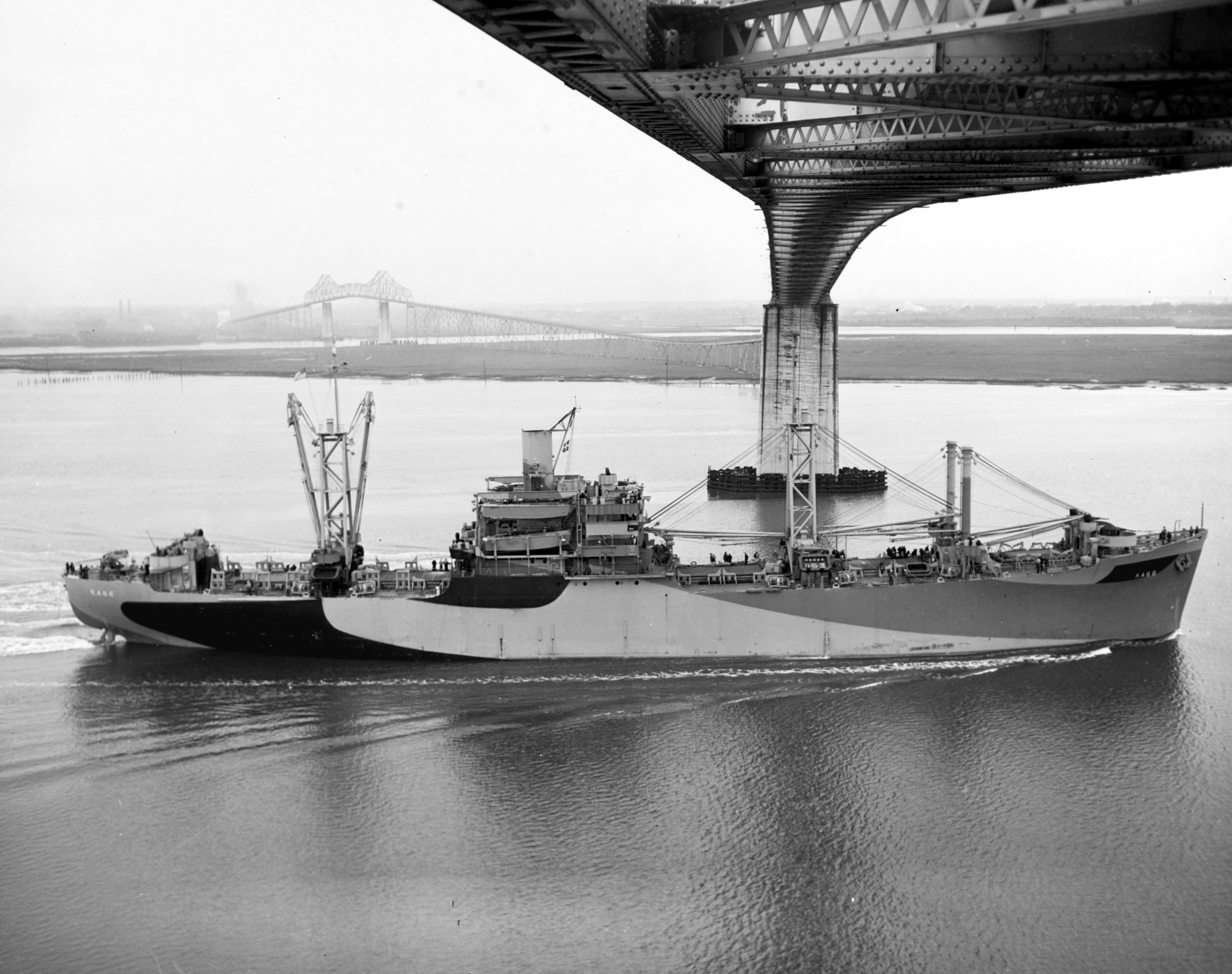

History

United States
- Name: USS Stokes
- Namesake: Stokes County, North Carolina
- Builder: North Carolina Shipbuilding Company, Wilmington, North Carolina
- Laid down: 26 June 1944
- Launched: 31 August 1944
- Commissioned: 12 October 1944
- Decommissioned: 9 July 1946
- Renamed: Hawaiian Banker (9 May 1947); SS Sierra (3 March 1961); SS Fanwood (8 September 1961); SS A&J Doctor Max (20 April 1964); SS Fanwood (10 July 1964)
- Stricken: 19 July 1946
- Honors and awards: 2 battle stars (World War II)
- Fate: Scrapped in Taiwan by Kenematsu-Gosho, Ltd. 4 September 1971

General characteristics
- Class & type: Tolland-class attack cargo ship
- Displacement: 13,910 long tons (14,133 t) full
- Length: 459 ft 2 in (139.95 m)
- Beam: 63 ft (19 m)
- Draft: 26 ft 4 in (8.03 m)
- Speed: 16.5 knots (30.6 km/h; 19.0 mph)
- Boats & landing craft carried: 14 × LCVP; 8 × LCM
- Complement: 395
- Armament: 1 × 5"/38 caliber gun; 4 × twin 40 mm guns; 16 × Single 20 mm AA gun mounts

USS Stokes (AKA-68) was a Tolland-class attack cargo ship in service with the United States Navy from 1944 to 1946. She was sold into commercial service and scrapped in 1971.

== History ==
Stokes was named after Stokes County, North Carolina. She was laid down as a Type C2-S-AJ3 ship on 26 June 1944 by the North Carolina Shipbuilding Company, Wilmington, North Carolina; launched on 31 August 1944, sponsored by Mrs. W. D. Woodall; acquired by the Navy from the United States Maritime Commission on a loan-charter basis; and commissioned on 12 October 1944.

=== World War II, 1944–1945 ===
After a brief shakedown and yard availability period, Stokes loaded general cargo at Norfolk and sailed for the Pacific on 11 December. She transited the Panama Canal on 21 December 1944 and arrived at Pearl Harbor early in January 1945. The attack cargo ship was then assigned to Transport Division 48 which was preparing to participate in the assault against Iwo Jima. She moved to Hilo, Hawaii; loaded troops and equipment; and sailed with the division to the staging area in the Marianas. The ships stood out of Saipan on 16 February for Iwo Jima.

Stokes arrived off Iwo Jima on 19 February as the assault waves of U.S. Marines landed on the beaches and, for the next two weeks, supplied them with rockets, ammunition, and gasoline. She then loaded combat casualties for evacuation to the base hospital at Saipan. After disembarking the wounded there, the ship moved to Guam to replace many of her small boats that had been lost or disabled at Iwo Jima. Stokes then sailed to Espiritu Santo and loaded troops and equipment for the upcoming assault on the Ryūkyūs. Since her passengers were part of the floating reserve, the ship did not arrive at Okinawa until 10 April. On the 19th Stokes proceeded, via Ulithi, Guam, and Pearl Harbor, to the West Coast of the United States. She called at San Francisco before moving up the coast to Seattle for loading. Stokes sailed for Iwo Jima and on to Okinawa.

=== Post-war activities, 1945–1946 ===
After the war ended, the ship then operated between the Philippine Islands, Guam, and Japan until routed back to the West Coast. She returned to Seattle in January 1946 and was routed to the East Coast for inactivation and disposal.

=== Decommissioning and civilian service ===
She arrived at Norfolk on 29 May and was decommissioned on 9 July. Her name was struck from the Navy List on 19 July 1946 and she was returned to the War Shipping Administration. Ex-USS Stokes had a tumultuous civilian career, being sold, re-sold, and re-possessed numerous times over the next 25 years.

Initially purchased from the Maritime Commission by the Oceanic Steamship Company, she was renamed Sierra on 9 May 1947. She operated under that name until 3 March 1961 when Oceanic sold the vessel to Matson Navigation Co, who renamed her Hawaiian Banker. Later that year (8 September) Matson renamed the ship Fanwood. Matson sold the ship to Sea-Land Services, Inc. on 15 September 1961. Sea-Land sold her to Georgelis Mid-America Lines, Inc. on 20 April 1964 where she served under the name A&J Doctor Max until being repossessed by Sea-Land on 10 July 1964 and named back to Fanwood. On 13 May 1965 Sea-Land transferred the title on the ship to the Maritime Administration under the exchange program; MARAD promptly leased the ship back to Sea-Land the same day. The lease expired about a year later (22 April 1966) and the ship was returned to MARAD who sold her to Waterman Industries Corp the same day. Waterman sold the vessel to Gatx/Boothe Corp on 15 May 1969. Gatx/Boothe maintained the ship for a little over two years until selling her one last time to Kenematsu-Gosho, Ltd. of Japan on 4 September 1971. The old ship was broken up in Taiwan shortly thereafter.

== Awards ==
Stokes received two battle stars for her service in World War II.
