= USS Trousdale =

Cargo ship of the United States Navy

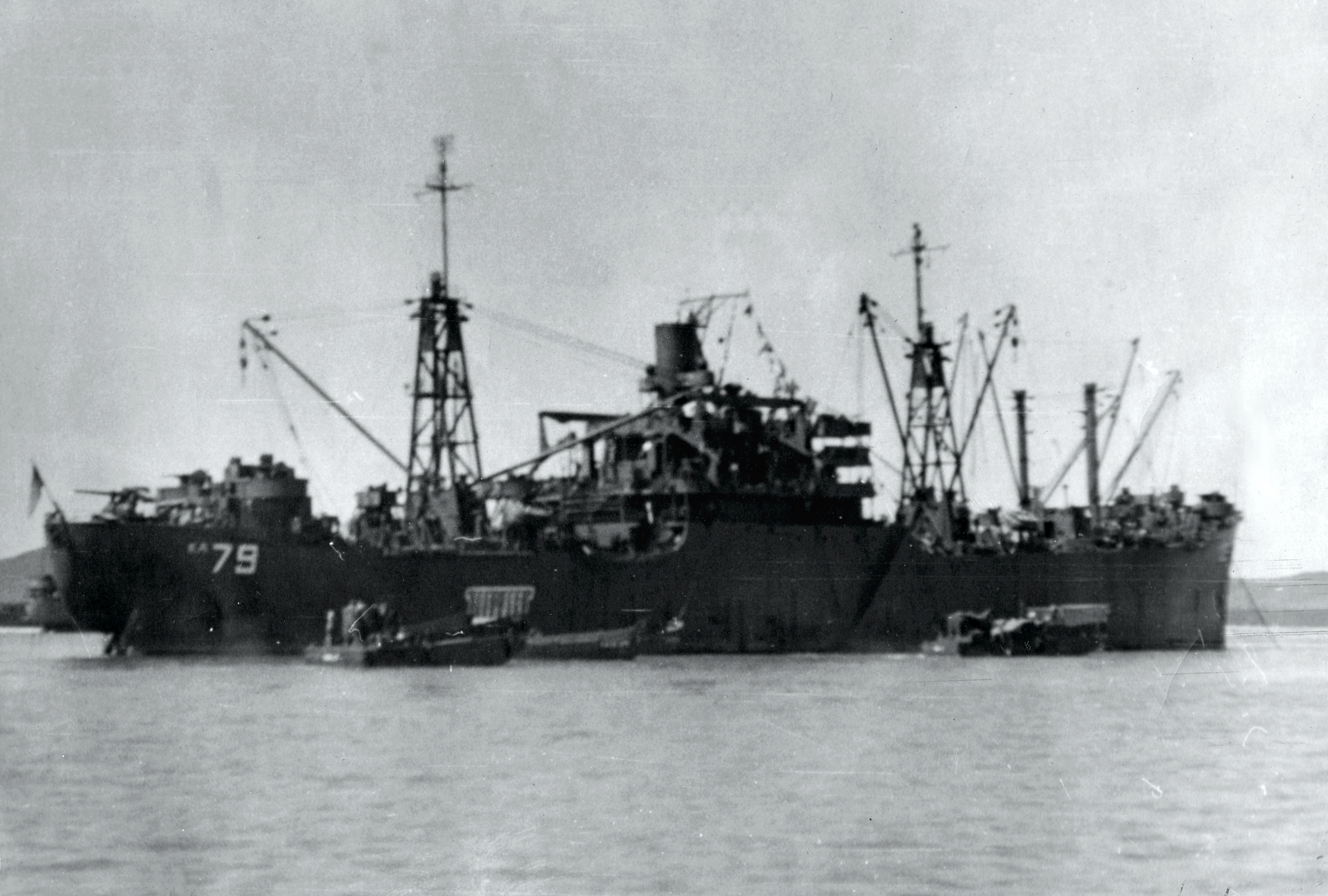

History

United States
- Name: USS Trousdale
- Namesake: Trousdale County, Tennessee
- Builder: North Carolina Shipbuilding Company, Wilmington, North Carolina
- Laid down: 22 April 1944
- Launched: 3 July 1944
- Commissioned: 21 December 1944
- Decommissioned: 29 April 1946
- Renamed: SS Lafayette; SS Ocean Deborah; SS Green Dale
- Stricken: 8 May 1946
- Honors and awards: 1 battle star (World War II)
- Fate: Sold into merchant service, 1947; Sold for scrapping, 1968

General characteristics
- Class & type: Tolland-class attack cargo ship
- Displacement: 13,910 long tons (14,133 t) full
- Length: 459 ft 2 in (139.95 m)
- Beam: 63 ft (19 m)
- Draft: 26 ft 4 in (8.03 m)
- Speed: 16.5 knots (30.6 km/h; 19.0 mph)
- Complement: 395
- Armament: 1 × 5"/38 caliber gun; 4 × twin 40 mm guns; 16 × 20 mm guns

USS Trousdale (AKA-79) was a Tolland-class attack cargo ship in service with the United States Navy from 1944 to 1946. She was sold into commercial service and was scrapped in 1968.

== History ==
Trousdale was named after Trousdale County, Tennessee. She was laid down as a Type C2-S-AJ3 ship under a United States Maritime Commission contract (MC hull 1386) on 22 April 1944 at Wilmington, North Carolina, by the North Carolina Shipbuilding Co.; launched on 3 July 1944; sponsored by Mrs. J. R. Craig; delivered to the Navy under loan-charter on 24 July 1944; and commissioned at Hoboken, N.J., on 21 December 1944.

=== World War II, 1945 ===
The attack cargo ship conducted shakedown training off Long Island, New York, and in the Virginia Capes area and proceeded to Bayonne, New Jersey, to load cargo earmarked for the Pacific theater of operations. On 27 January, Trousdale headed for the open sea in company with Charles E. Brannon (DE-446), bound for Panama. She transited the Panama Canal on 2 February and sailed for Hawaii on 3 February.

Reaching Pearl Harbor on 17 February, Trousdale spent the next 25 days unloading cargo; making minor repairs; and waiting for orders. In mid-March 1945, she unloaded her first combat cargo – miscellaneous units of the 10th Army, including signal battalions, military police, a weather squadron, communications companies, bomb disposal units, and occupational government personnel, together with 200 vehicles and 900 tons of equipment. On 14 March 1945, Trousdale set out for the Marshall Islands.

After anchoring at Eniwetok on 22 March, the ship headed for the Carolines, arriving at Ulithi on 29 March. She got underway for the Ryukyus on 13 April and arrived off Okinawa on the 17th.

Trousdale anchored off Hagushi beach while the amassed battleships, cruisers, and destroyers shelled Japanese defenses further inland. After commencing unloading that evening, she temporarily suspended operations as Japanese "kamikazes" flew in from the north to attempt to crash American ships engaged in the landings.

Hampered by kamikazes and bad weather conditions with heavy seas and high winds, the ship lay off the beach for the next six days, engaged in nearly continuous unloading operations. On 22 April, she joined a south-bound convoy and, on 27 April, made port at Saipan, where she transferred all of her landing craft, save two, to other ships.

Crossing the equator on 7 May, Trousdale anchored off Guadalcanal on the 9th and soon commenced loading equipment belonging to rear-echelon units of the 6th Marine Division. On 18 May, the ship weighed anchor and steamed for Tulagi, where she loaded landing craft and set out, via Eniwetok and Saipan, for Guam, arriving there on 7 June.

On 13 June, the attack cargo ship sailed for the west coast, making port at San Francisco. The ship then underwent minor repairs and loaded a cargo of oil and a new set of landing craft before setting a westerly course on 10 July, bound for Tinian, the American B-29 bomber base in the Marianas.

Meanwhile, the war in the Pacific was drawing to a close as American forces swept close to the Japanese home islands themselves. Carrier planes and ships offshore bombarded coastal targets; planes and ships made the sea lanes untenable for Japanese sea power; and the Japanese air force rapidly dwindled in numbers.

Arriving at Tinian on 27 July, the ship commenced offloading immediately and was working hard at the task on 5 August when an American B-29 bomber exploded an atomic bomb over Hiroshima. Trousdale completed discharging her cargo on the 8th and shifted her anchorage to Saipan the same day. While she was anchored there on 15 August, word came through that Japan had accepted the terms of the Potsdam Declaration and capitulated to the Allies. The long and bloody war in the Pacific was over.

=== Post-war activities, 1945–1946 ===
Yet for Trousdale, and ships like her, the occupation operations were just commencing. Accordingly, the ship departed Saipan on 29 August, arriving at Okinawa on 4 September. The attack cargo ship spent a week loading Army equipment for occupation forces and, in company with three other AKA's, sailed on 11 September for Korea.

En route, lookouts sighted mines drifting in the murky waters of the East China and Yellow Seas. Gunfire from the ships destroyed these menaces to navigation. The ships made port at Jinsen on 13 September and commenced offloading soon after arrival. The AKA's encountered difficulties posed by the 20- to 30-foot tidal range which permitted larger landing craft to discharge cargo only at specific times. After completing the unloading operations, the ships headed back to Okinawa, arriving there on 18 September.

Trousdale then embarked marines for passage to Taku, China. Anchoring off Taku Bar, the ship sent her landing boats up the Wei River for special duties, while unloading the marines for occupation duty. Orders soon came, sending Trousdale to the Philippines. She departed the China coast on 6 October, and – after steaming through a typhoon so intense that the ship's inclinometer recorded 55-degree rolls – reached Manila on 13 October 1945. There, the ship took on fuel and provisions and was soon underway for Hong Kong. Upon her arrival in the vicinity of the British Crown Colony of Hong Kong, the ship prepared to embark Chinese soldiers for passage to North China.

Chiang Kai-shek, as he had done during the war with Japan, sought American assistance in his as yet undeclared war against the communists. This included the air lift and sea lift of Nationalist troops to cities in northern China, population centers rapidly coming under the influence of the communist forces who had taken pains to encourage popular support while fighting the Japanese.

Accordingly, Trousdale took on board large contingents of Chinese troops, many of whom had never before been on a ship. Commencing the loading on 24 October, the operation was completed the next day, and the ship sailed with her human cargo for Chinwangtao at the base of the Great Wall of China. Making port on 30 October, she offloaded her troops and returned southward for another load – the Chinese First Division – making port at Hong Kong on 7 November and departing two days later for Qingdao where she arrived on 14 November.

While remaining at Qingdao, the ship received urgent boiler repairs. The attack cargo ship got underway again on 14 November for Japan and arrived at Sasebo on the 20th. The ship sailed on New Year's Day, 1946, bound, via Midway Island, for the west coast.

Trousdale moored at San Diego, California, on 18 January 1946, but soon headed for Panama and steamed through the Canal on 2 February, exactly one year to the day since her first transit. She arrived at Norfolk, Virginia, on 11 February and, six days later, headed for the New York Navy Yard to prepare for decommissioning.

=== Decommissioning and fate ===
On 6 March, the attack cargo ship departed New York City on her last voyage as a United States Navy man-of-war and arrived at Norfolk on the following day. Trousdale was decommissioned on 29 April 1946, returned to the War Shipping Board of the United States Maritime Commission on the 30th, assigned to the National Defense Reserve Fleet, and berthed in the James River. Her name was struck from the Navy List on 8 May 1946.

The ship was sold in 1947 to the Waterman Steamship Corporation, of Mobile, Alabama, and served as a merchant ship under the name SS Lafayette until purchased in 1954 by the Ocean Transportation Co., Inc., New York, N.Y., and renamed SS Ocean Deborah. In 1962, she was purchased by the Central Gulf Steamship Corp., New Orleans, Louisiana, and renamed SS Green Dale. She served under that name until 1970 when she was sold to a purchaser in Taiwan and, presumably, she was soon scrapped.

== Awards ==
Trousdale received one battle star for her World War II service at Okinawa.
