= USS Venango =

Cargo ship of the United States Navy

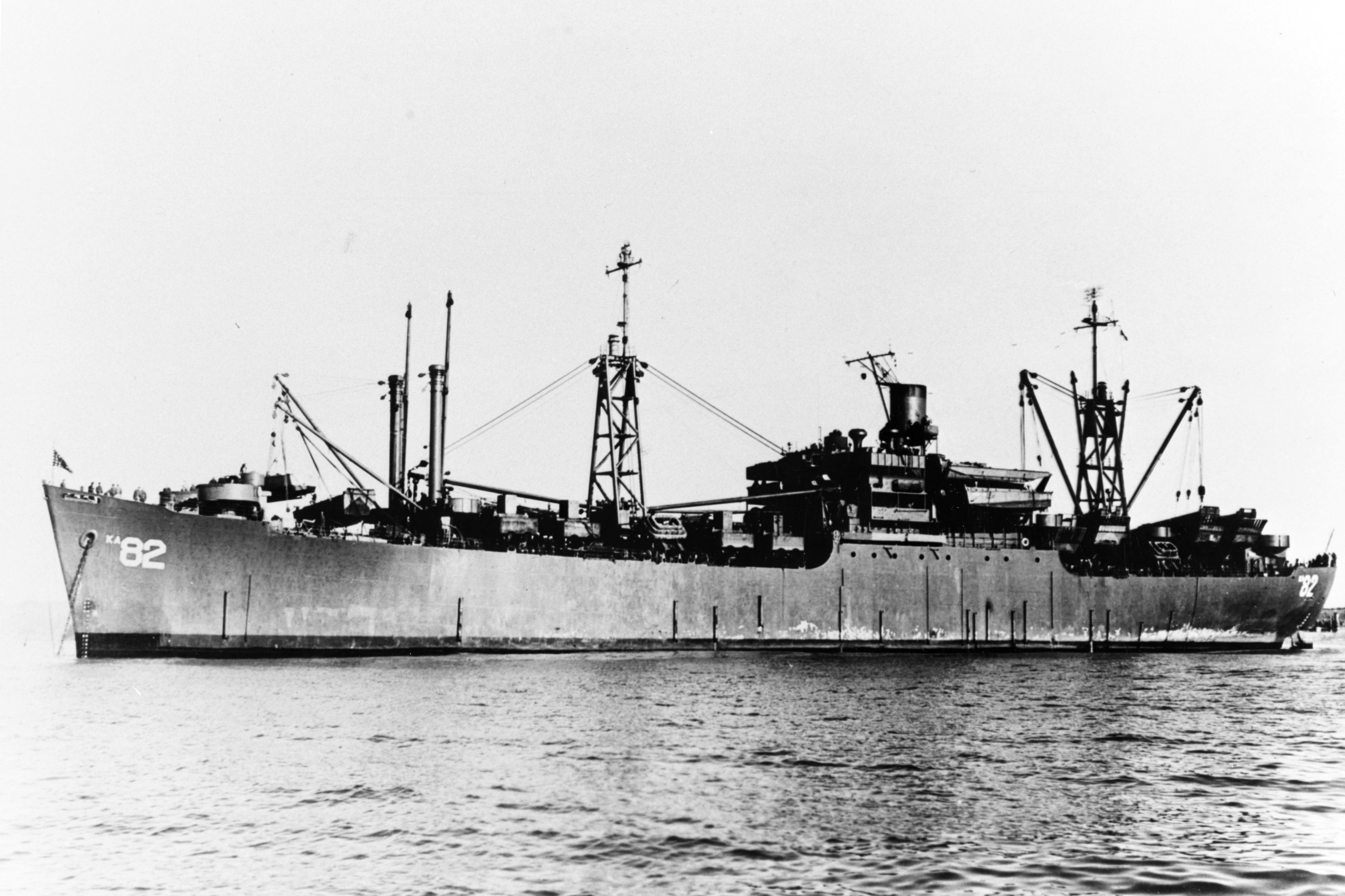

History

United States
- Name: USS Venango
- Namesake: Venango County, Pennsylvania
- Builder: North Carolina Shipbuilding Company, Wilmington, North Carolina
- Laid down: 6 June 1944
- Launched: 9 August 1944
- Commissioned: 2 January 1945
- Decommissioned: 18 April 1946
- Renamed: SS Flying Eagle; SS Southern Star; SS Anna
- Stricken: 1 May 1946
- Honors and awards: 1 battle star (World War II)
- Fate: Sold into merchant service February 1947; Scrapped February 1971

General characteristics
- Class & type: Tolland-class attack cargo ship
- Displacement: 13,910 long tons (14,133 t) full
- Length: 459 ft 2 in (139.95 m)
- Beam: 63 ft (19 m)
- Draft: 26 ft 4 in (8.03 m)
- Speed: 16.5 knots (30.6 km/h; 19.0 mph)
- Complement: 247
- Armament: 1 × 5"/38 caliber gun; 4 × twin 40 mm guns; 16 × 20 mm guns

USS Venango (AKA-82) was a Tolland-class attack cargo ship in service with the United States Navy from 1945 to 1946. She was sold into commercial service and was scrapped in 1971.

== History ==
Venango was named after Venango County, Pennsylvania. She was laid down as a Type C2-S-AJ3 ship under a Maritime Commission contract (MC hull 1391) on 6 June 1944 at Wilmington, North Carolina, by the North Carolina Shipbuilding Company; launched on 9 August 1944; sponsored by Miss Alana Jane Matthes; placed briefly in service from 25 August to 30 August 1944 while being towed to New York harbor for conversion by the Bethlehem Steel Co., Hoboken, N.J.; and commissioned on 2 January 1945.

=== World War II, 1945 ===
Following trials in Long Island Sound and shakedown training in Chesapeake Bay, the new attack cargo ship got underway from Norfolk on 2 February; transited the Panama Canal on the 8th; and reached Pearl Harbor on Washington's Birthday. There, she reported to Amphibious Forces, Pacific, for duty as a unit of Transport Division (TransDiv) 63. She commenced discharging cargo on the 27th and, the following day, was reassigned to TransDiv 56.

After unloading the cargo she had taken on at Norfolk, Venango proceeded on 4 March to Army Transport Pier 26 at Honolulu and began taking on cargo for the impending assault on Okinawa. On the 14th, she embarked troops, vehicles, and gear of the Army's 82nd Signal Construction Battalion. The next day, she got underway for a staging point in the Marshalls. On the 23rd, she anchored at Eniwetok; then, on the 25th, again got underway and steamed for the Western Carolines. Off Ulithi on the 29th, she rode out a typhoon — high winds and heavy squalls — and then entered the lagoon the next day and anchored. With elements of Task Group 55.8 steaming in a four-column formation, she departed Ulithi on the afternoon of the 13th and headed for the Ryūkyūs.

About dawn on 17 April, lookouts on the attack cargo ship sighted Okinawa off the ship's starboard beam, some 16 miles away. Later that morning, she anchored off Okinawa and began unloading her boats at 1830. In the days that followed, Venango continued discharging the troops, cargo, and equipment of the 82nd Signal Battalion. Often at dawn and dusk, the call to general quarters alerted all hands that enemy air raiders were nearby. Although Venango sighted no Japanese planes, enemy raiders hit numerous nearby land targets as the cargo ship lay at anchor off Okinawa. On 22 April, she departed the Ryukyus and reached Saipan on the 27th.

On 1 May, she shifted from the anchorage to a dock in Tanapag harbor to load equipment and cargo of the 21st Naval Construction Battalion for transportation to Okinawa. Two days later, she departed Saipan in convoy and, on the 27th, stood into Nakafusuku Wan. Numerous air raids alerts marked the days that followed. An hour after midnight on 31 May, Venango began discharging her cargo. Frequent alerts continued as she emptied her holds. On 3 June, a Japanese bomber splashed in the transport area; and, the next day, Venango made an emergency sortie with a six-ship merchant convoy to ride out an approaching typhoon. However, the typhoon did not strike Okinawa; and Venango returned to Nakagusuku Wan on the 5th and resumed unloading. On the 6th, action picked up; and observers on the cargo ship witnessed the air attack in which destroyer minelayers Harry F. Bauer (DM-26) and J. William Ditter (DM-31) shot down six Japanese aircraft, despite serious damage to both ships by kamikazes.

Venango departed Okinawa in convoy on the 19th and steamed via Saipan to Pearl Harbor where she arrived on 29 June. She shifted berths to Honolulu harbor on 7 July. There, she loaded miscellaneous cargo, including beer, lumber, cement, and tar, before getting underway on the 13th and steaming independently for the Western Carolines. The same day, main engine damage forced her to reverse her course; and, on the 14th, she found herself back at Pearl Harbor for repairs.

The attack cargo ship again departed Oahu on the 23rd, proceeded independently via Ulithi, and arrived at Hydrographer Bank in the Palaus on 6 August. Anchored between Peleliu and Angaur, she loaded cargo and got underway late the following afternoon. She entered Leyte Gulf on the morning of 9 August, unloaded cargo, and was anchored in Guiuan Roadstead off Samar on the 15th, when Japan capitulated.

=== Post-war activities, 1945–1946 ===
After discharging the remainder of her cargo, she began taking on 8th Army troops and equipment on 1 September. Underway on the 3rd, she anchored in Manila Bay on the 5th; then, two days later, joined the sortie of Transport Squadron (TransRon) 24, bound for Yokohama.

Early on the morning of the 13th, the ships formed a single column and steamed into Tokyo Bay. Venango docked at Yokohama to unload her cargo and, on the 18th, weathered a typhoon. The following day, she departed Tokyo Bay in company with TransRon 24 and set her course for Guam. She arrived at Apra Harbor on the 23rd, loaded cargo of the 3rd Marines, 6th Marine Division and, on the 30th, set her course in convoy for China. On 12 October, she moored at Qingdao and began discharging cargo. Still in company with TransRon 24, she departed the Chinese coast on 17 October and anchored in Manila Bay on the 23rd. In November, she carried elements of the 52nd Chinese Army from Haiphong to Qinhuangdao, China; then, on the 20th, she departed the Gulf of Bohai off Taku and set her course for the west coast of the United States. Early on the morning of 6 December, she entered the Strait of Juan de Fuca and, in mid-afternoon, moored at the Naval Station, Seattle, and discharged her passengers. Following repairs, she got underway on 1 February 1946 and steamed via San Francisco and the Panama Canal to Norfolk where she arrived on the 25th.

=== Decommissioning and fate ===
She was decommissioned at Norfolk on 18 April 1946; and, on 22 April, she was returned to the War Shipping Administration. Her name was struck from the Navy List on 1 May 1946.

Sold to the Waterman Steamship Corporation, she operated out of Mobile, Alabama, beginning in 1947. In March 1952 she was transferred to Isbrandtsen Steamship Company and for more than 10 years operated out of New York under the name SS Flying Eagle. On 31 August 1962 Isbrandtsen sold the ship to American Export Lines. American Export and Isbrandtsen merged into a conglomerate on 8 June 1964 bringing her into the fold of the newly combined American Export-Isbrandtsen Lines. She was sold again to Valmar Shipping on 21 November 1968 for the sum of $957,818 (US) and renamed SS Southern Star. On 17 February she was sold to the Polembros Group of Greece and renamed SS Anna; she was reflagged Panamanian at this time as well. The old AKA was sold for the last time in February 1971 and subsequently scrapped at Bilbao, Spain.

== Awards ==
Venango received one battle star for service in World War II.
