= Tolland-class attack cargo ship =

WWII American ship

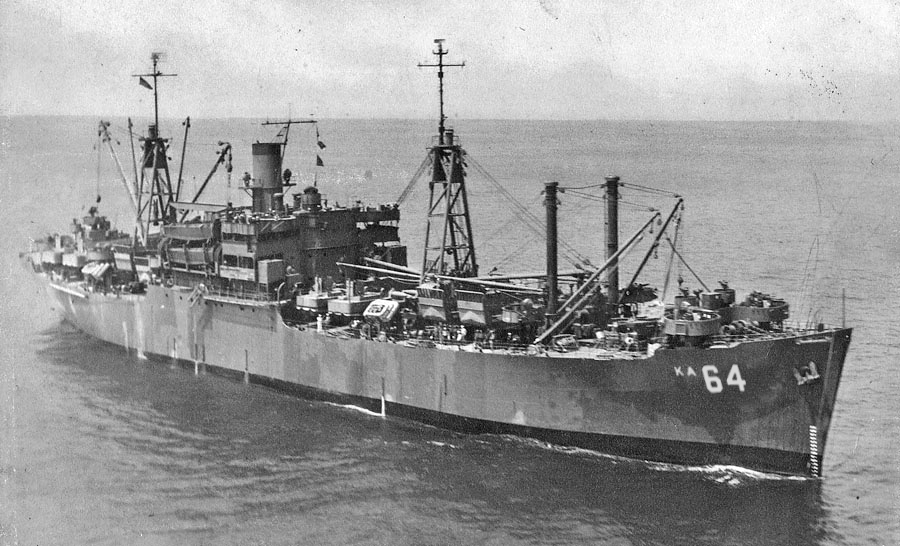
- USS Tolland (AKA-64), lead ship of the Tolland class

Class overview
- Builders: North Carolina Shipbuilding Company
- Operators: United States Navy
- Preceded by: Andromeda class
- Built: 1944–1945
- Completed: 32

General characteristics
- Type: Attack cargo ship
- Displacement: 13,910 tons full
- Length: 459 ft 2 in (140 m)
- Beam: 63 ft (19 m)
- Draft: 26 ft 4 in (8 m)
- Speed: 16.5 kn (31 km/h)
- Complement: 375 (varies)
- Armament: 1 × 5-inch 38 caliber dual purpose gun mount; 4 × twin 40 mm gun mounts; 16 × 20 mm guns gun mounts

The Tolland-class attack cargo ships were built by North Carolina Shipbuilding Co. in Wilmington, North Carolina during the latter stages of World War II.

All of these ships were built on the same standard hull design, but there were some differences between each ship. The armament varied, as did the other ships of the day. During 1944–1945, the 5"/38 was recognized as the best gun for the dual role of antiaircraft and naval gunfire support, and the 40 mm was seen as the best antiaircraft gun. The older 20 mm and .50 caliber guns had been known to be of limited value, and were being phased out, though they appeared on some of these ships. The 20 mm guns were later removed from all of them, but it is not clear just when this happened.

== Ships in Class ==
Hull no.	Ship	Keel laid	Launched	Commission	Decomm	Fate
AKA-64	Tolland	22 April 1944	26 June 1944	4 September 1944	1 July 1946	Sold into merchant service 3 October 1947 Scrapped June 1971
AKA-65	Shoshone	12 May 1944	17 July 1944	24 September 1944	28 June 1946	Sold into merchant service, 1947 Scrapped, 1971
AKA-66	Southampton	26 May 1944	28 July 1944	16 September 1944	21 June 1946	Sold into civilian service, American Export-Isbrandtsen Lines as SS Flying Clipper
AKA-67	Starr	13 June 1944	18 August 1944	29 September 1944	31 May 1946	Sold into merchant service, 3 December 1947, Sold for scrapping, 9 September 1970
AKA-68	Stokes	26 June 1944	31 August 1944	12 October 1944	9 July 1946	Sold to Oceanic Steamship Company, Scrapped in Taiwan by Kenematsu-Gosho, Ltd. 4 September 1971
AKA-69	Suffolk	11 July 1944	15 September 1944	23 October 1944	27 June 1946	Sold for commercial service, Scrapped in Taiwan, 1971
AKA-70	Tate	22 July 1944	26 September 1944	25 November 1944	10 July 1946	Sold into merchant service, scrapped October 1970
AKA-71	Todd	10 August 1944	10 October 1944	30 November 1944	25 June 1946	Sold for commercial service, scrapped 22 February 1972
AKA-72	Caswell	1944	24 October 1944	13 December 1944	19 June 1946	Sold into merchant service, 15 September 1947, Scrapped at Santander, Spain starting in August 1972
AKA-73	New Hanover	31 August 1944	31 October 1944	22 December 1944	30 July 1946	Sold into merchant service 31 June 1947, Sold for scrapping 16 October 1970
AKA-74	Lenoir	7 September 1944	6 November 1944	14 December 1944	13 June 1946	Sold into merchant service, 1 October 1947, Scrapped 1971
AKA-75	Alamance	15 September 1944	11 November 1944	22 December 1944	25 June 1946	Sold for merchant service, Scrapped 1971 in Taiwan
AKA-76	Torrance	1 April 1944	6 June 1944	18 November 1944	20 June 1946	Sold into merchant service, 15 September 1947, Scrapped at Santander, Spain starting in August 1972
AKA-77	Towner	8 April 1944	13 June 1944	3 December 1944	10 June 1946	Sold for civilian use, abandoned July 1967 as a constructive total loss & scuttled.
AKA-78	Trego	14 April 1944	20 June 1944	21 December 1944	21 May 1946	Sold for merchant service, scrapped 27 October 1969
AKA-79	Trousdale	22 April 1944	3 July 1944	21 December 1944	29 April 1946	Sold into merchant service, 1947, Sold for scrapping, 1970
AKA-80	Tyrrell	6 May 1944	July 1944	4 December 1944	19 April 1946	Sold into merchant service, 1948
AKA-81	Valencia	20 May 1944	22 July 1944	9 January 1945	8 May 1946	Sold into merchant service, 1946, Scrapped May 1970
AKA-82	Venango	6 June 1944	9 August 1944	2 January 1945	18 April 1946	Sold into merchant service February 1947, Scrapped February 1971
AKA-83	Vinton	20 June 1944	25 August 1944	23 February 1945	16 March 1946	Sold into merchant service, 1947, Scrapped 22 November 1971
AKA-84	Waukesha	3 July 1944	6 September 1944	23 February 1945	10 July 1946	Sold into merchant service, 1947, Scrapped October 1970
AKA-85	Wheatland	17 July 1944	21 September 1944	3 April 1945	25 April 1946	Sold for merchant service, 3 April 1947, Scrapped at Taiwan, December 1973
AKA-86	Woodford	17 July 1944	5 October 1944	3 March 1945	1 May 1946	Sold into merchant service, 31 October 1947, Scrapped, 19 May 1973
AKA-87	Duplin	18 August 1944	17 October 1944	15 May 1945	21 May 1946	Sold into merchant service, 1946, Scrapped in 1971
AKA-101	Ottawa	5 October 1944	29 November 1944	8 February 1945	10 January 1947	Sold into merchant service, 1946, Lost, 1951
AKA-102	Prentiss	10 October 1944	6 December 1944	11 February 1945	31 May 1946	Sold into merchant service, 1947, Scrapped, March 1970
AKA-103	Rankin	31 October 1944	22 December 1944	25 February 1945	21 May 1947	Recommissioned 1952–1971, Sunk as a fishing & diving reef off Stuart, Florida, 24 July 1988
AKA-104	Seminole		28 December 1944	8 March 1945	23 December 1970	Sold for scrapping, 16 November 1977
AKA-105	Skagit	21 September 1944	18 November 1944	2 May 1945	30 June 1949	Recommissioned 1950–1969, Sold for scrap, 22 April 1974
AKA-106	Union	27 September 1944	23 November 1944	25 April 1945	5 June 1970	Sold for scrap, September 1977
AKA-107	Vermilion	17 October 1944	12 December 1944	23 June 1945	26 August 1949	Recommissioned 1950–1971, Sunk as artificial reef 24 August 1988
AKA-108	Washburn	24 October 1944	18 December 1944	17 May 1945	16 May 1970	Sold for scrap
AKA-109	San Joaquin	17 August 1945				Cancelled 27 August 1945

== See also ==
- Andromeda-class attack cargo ship
- Arcturus-class attack cargo ship
- Artemis-class attack cargo ship
- Charleston-class amphibious cargo ship
- List of United States Navy amphibious warfare ships
