= Samuel Pook =

Samuel Pook may refer to:

- Samuel M. Pook (1804–1878), Boston-based American naval architect
- Samuel Hartt Pook (1827–1901), his son, Boston-based American naval architect
