= USS Herald of the Morning =

US WWII ship

History

United States
- Name: Herald of the Morning
- Builder: Moore Dry Dock Company
- Launched: 14 August 1943
- Commissioned: 22 April 1944
- In service: 1944
- Identification: Official Number 244750; Signal: NEPK (Navy); KVCN (commercial service)
- Honors and awards: 5 battle stars for World War II service
- Fate: Scrapped, 1973
- Notes: Named for clipper ship Herald of the Morning

General characteristics
- Type: C2-S-B1
- Tonnage: 6,214 GRT
- Displacement: 6556 light
- Length: 459 ft 2 in (139.95 m) LOA; 438.9 ft (133.8 m) between perpendiculars (registry)
- Beam: 63 ft (19 m)
- Draft: 25 ft 9 in (7.85 m)
- Propulsion: 1 × General Electric steam turbine; 2 × Foster and Wheeler D-type boilers, 450 psi (3,100 kPa) 750°; double General Electric main reduction gears; 3 × 300 kW (400 hp) 120 V/240 V DC ship's service generators; 1 propeller, 6,000 shp (4,500 kW)
- Speed: 15.5 kn (17.8 mph; 28.7 km/h)
- Range: 16,000 nmi (18,000 mi; 30,000 km)
- Capacity: Cargo: 148,106 cu ft (4,193.9 m^{3})
- Troops: 1,575
- Complement: 28 officers, 375 enlisted
- Armament: 1 × single 5"/38 cal dual purpose gun mount; 4 × single 3"/50 cal dual purpose mounts

USS Herald of the Morning was a C2-S-B1 Maritime Commission hull that served in heavy combat in the Pacific Theatre during World War II as a merchant and United States Navy vessel.

== Ship history ==
Herald of the Morning was launched in a triple launch of C-2 ships celebrating Moore Dry Dock's honoring of the seventieth birthday of founder and chairman of the Board Joseph A. Moore Sr. and the award of the Maritime Commission "M". The two other ships were Monarch of the Seas and Spitfire.

She was assigned U.S. official Number 244750 and delivered on 30 November 1943, to the United States Lines, under contract to the War Shipping Administration (WSA). The ship made one trip to the Hawaiian Islands as a merchant cargo vessel before being converted into an auxiliary transport for naval use at United Engineering Company in Alameda, California.

=== U.S. Navy service ===
The ship was acquired by the Navy on loan-charter and commissioned on 22 April 1944, designated AP-173 with signal NEPK.

On 2 May the ship departed for the Hawaiian Islands with troops and cargo arriving six days later to engage in amphibious training exercises. On 1 June to assemble in the Marshall Islands before the invasion of the Marianas. As part of the reserve group Herald of the Morning arrived off Saipan 16 June, the day after the initial landings. Afterlanding troops and equipment the ship departed for Eniwetok 26 June and then Pearl Harbor on 13 July to load for continue fighting. After loading the ship departed 12 August for the Guadalcanal area for training.

On 8 September the ship, assigned to the Peleliu operation in the Palau Islands, departed to arrive seven days later where it engaged in a diversionary landing on Babelthuap Island on 17 September two days after the actual landings to the south. After the diversion embarked troops and equipment were landed a day after the initial landings on Angaur.

On 21 September the transport sailed for Ulithi, disembarked troops and cargo then sailed for Manus arriving in Seeadler Harbor on 28 September. There the ship was assigned to the Northern Attack Force for the landings on Leyte. The ship departed Manus 12 October to discharge embarked troops and cargo on 20 October in the initial assault phase of the landings. After completion the ship departed for Guam by way of Palau to embark more troops and equipment for reinforcements as the Japanese resisted with a naval sortie resulting in the Battle of Leyte Gulf. The ship took on troops at Guam who were looking forward to the prospect of rest in New Caledonia but the ship received orders two days from there to divert to Manus before returning to the Philippines to land embarked troops and equipment at Dulag, Leyte on 23 November. (Note: The reference, The 233rd Engineer Combat Battalion, notes other ships involved in the Guam to Manus to Dulag transport as USS Arneb, USS Barnstable, USS Elmore and USS Harris.) On 24 November Herald of the Morning headed for New Guinea, arriving on the 30th training near Sausapor for the Invasion of Lingayen Gulf. The convoy was under heavy air attack en route to arrival off the invasion beaches on 9 January where the ship landed embarked troops under air attack and moved to the anchorage. On 12 January the ship moved to Leyte Gulf to take on troops on the 14th and then to Biak for additional troops before returning and landing those forces on Mindoro 9 February.

After a return to Leyte Herald of the Morning headed for Ulithi then Iwo Jima where she embarked veterans of that battle to head for Pearl Harbor then San Francisco for arrival there on 23 April. After repairs and embarking troops sailed 29 June for Manila arriving 29 July. There embarked troops were landed and veterans embarked for return to San Francisco with the surrender announced before arrival on 11 September. On arrival the ship was assigned to the massive effort to bring troops home in Operation Magic Carpet making four trips in the Pacific before being released for deactivation 21 June 1946. After arrival at Olympia, Washington the ship was decommissioned on 9 August 1946 for return to the Maritime Commission.

=== Merchant Service ===
Herald of the Morning was placed in the Suisun Bay Reserve Fleet on 9 October 1946 remaining there until withdrawn on 8 April 1948 for transfer to Waterman Steamship Company after its purchase of the ship. Waterman renamed the vessel Citrus Packer. In 1950, two crewman of Citrus Packer were killed by a North Korean sniper ambush. The report stated that the two men left the ship when it docked in Inchon on 1 October and were never seen again. Four days later, when the ship sailed, the two were reported missing to U.S. Army authorities. When the vessel arrived in Yokohama the skipper was notified that their bodies had been found. In 1949 the ship was grounded in a hurricane. She sailed as Citrus Packer until 1958, when she was sold to Gulf-South American Steamship Company as Gulf Trader. In 1966 the ship was registered as Bowling Green for Pan-American Tankers Corporation. During all post war commercial service the ship's signal was KVCN.

== Fate ==
As of 30 July 1969, the ship was reported as "unseaworthy" according to a U.S. Fifth Circuit Court of Appeals case, in which a longshoreman was injured while loading and storing cargo. He was awarded $75,000 in damages. She was scrapped in 1973.

== Ship Awards ==
Herald of the Morning received five battle stars for World War II service.

Combat Action Ribbon
American Campaign Medal	Asiatic-Pacific Campaign Medal (6 awards)	World War II Victory Medal
Navy Occupation Medal	Philippine Presidential Unit Citation	Philippine Liberation Medal (3 awards)
