= Witchcraft (clipper) =

1850 California clipper

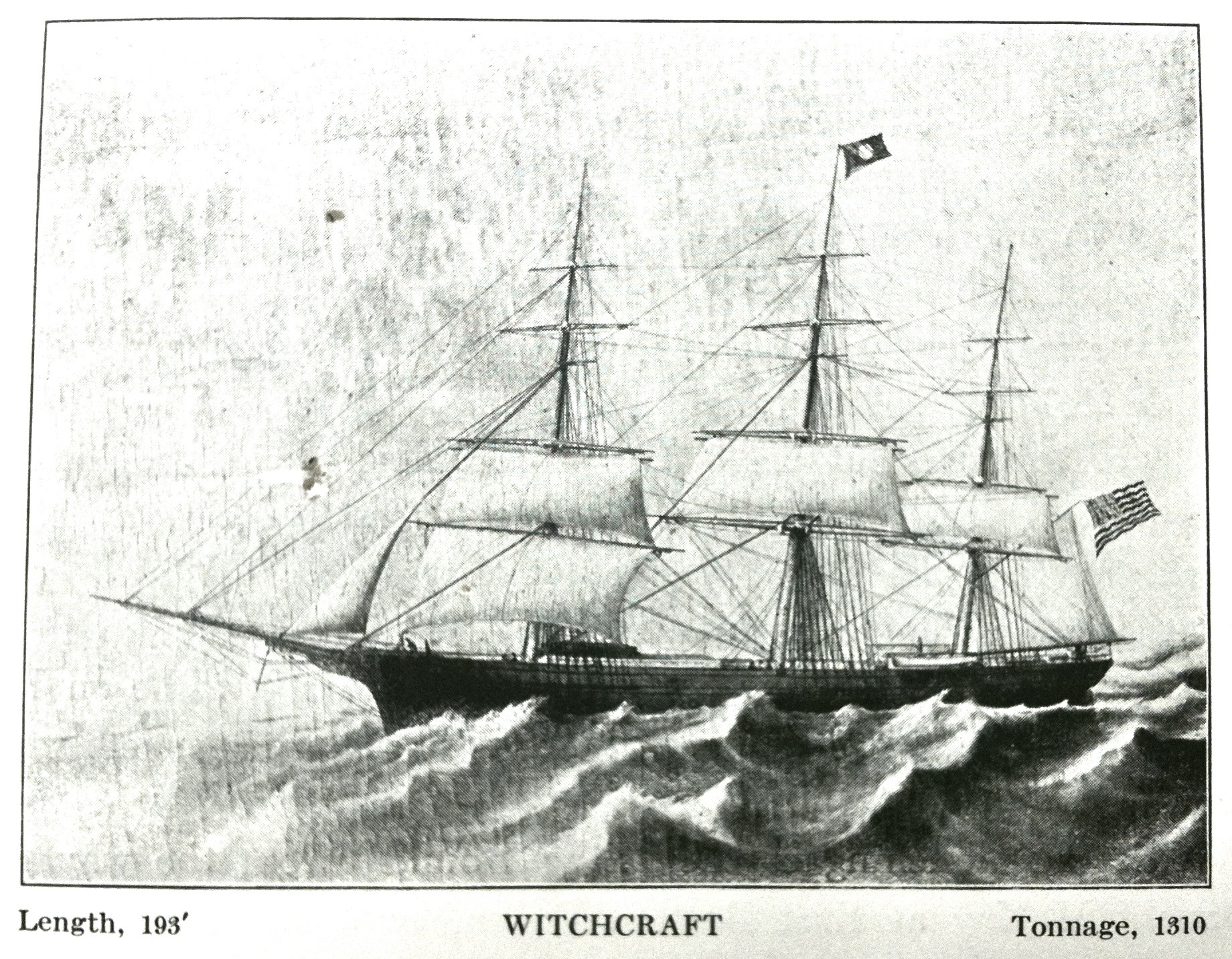

History

United States
- Name: Witchcraft
- Owner: S. Rogers & W.D. Pickman, Salem, MA
- Builder: Paul Curtis & Taylor, Chelsea, MA
- Launched: 21 December 1850
- Acquired: "Sold to T. Magoun & Sons, Boston, for $66,000", 1854
- Fate: Lost, 8 April 1861, "en route to Hampton Roads, VA, from Callao, Peru. Went ashore on Chicamanconic in sight of Cape Hatteras and Bodie Lights and was pounded to pieces."

General characteristics
- Class & type: Clipper
- Tons burthen: 1310 tons OM
- Length: 193 ft. OA
- Beam: 39 ft. 4 in.
- Draft: 22 ft.
- Notes: 2 decks

Witchcraft was a clipper built in 1850 for the California and China trade. She made record passages from Rio de Janeiro to San Francisco, and from San Francisco to Callao, Peru.

== Construction ==
Witchcraft was described as a very beautiful ship, with a figurehead of "a grim Salem witch riding upon her aerial broomstick".

== Voyages ==
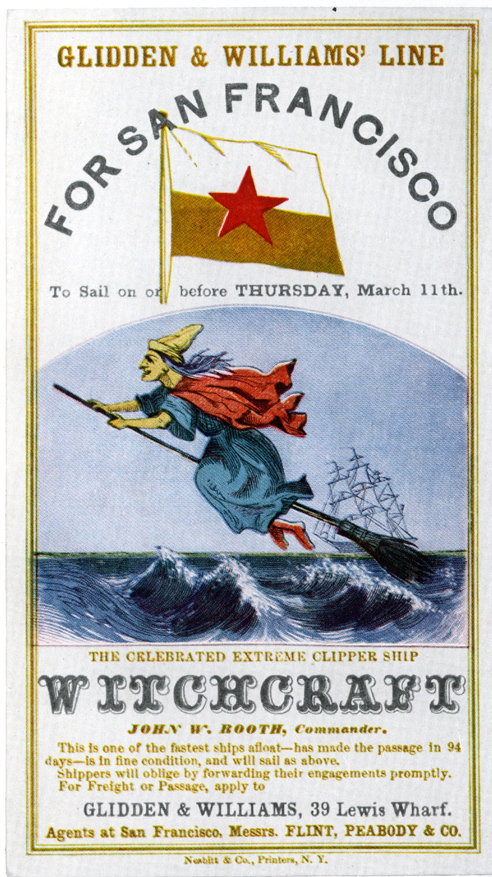

Witchcraft was commanded by Captain William C. Rogers, a son of one of the owners.

In 1852, on a voyage from San Francisco to Hong Kong, she lost her main and mizzen masts with all sails and rigging attached during a severe typhoon in the China Sea.

Ports of call during her career included New York, San Francisco, Boston, Shanghai, Manila, Melbourne, and Mauritius. On January 2, 1859, W.C. Rogers Company in Boston accepted the draft of Captain J.W. Booth in a letter sent from London for 358 pounds, paying for Captain J.W. Booth's appointment as captain of Witchcraft.

== Records set between Rio and San Francisco, San Francisco and Callao ==
In 1851 she sailed from New York to San Francisco in 128 days, of which 21 days was spent in Rio de Janeiro to replace the mizzen mast. "The continued voyage from Rio de Janeiro took 62 days which is the fastest passage on record." Game Cock, a clipper "of similar tonnage" which had left New York for San Francisco one day earlier, was also pushing hard and spent 57 days in Rio for repairs to her mainmast, resulting in a 128-day passage.

In 1854, she "sailed from New York to San Francisco in 98 days" and "San Francisco to Callao in 32 days. This is the fastest passage on record."

== See also ==
- List of clipper ships
- Paul Curtis (shipbuilder)
- Samuel Hartt Pook
