= Thatcher Magoun =

Shipbuilder

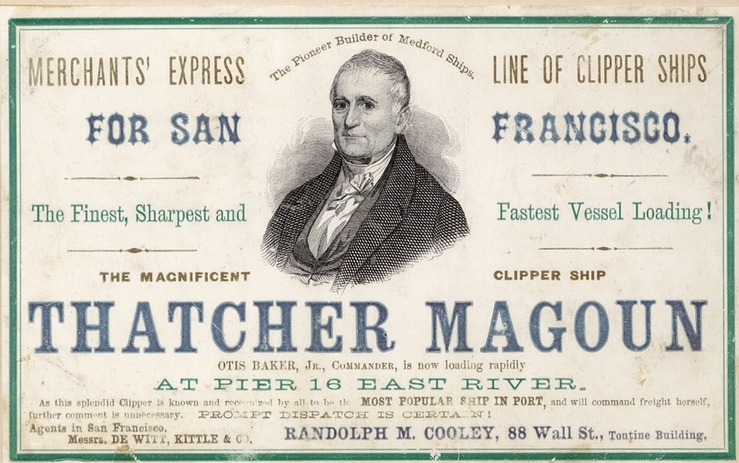
- Thatcher Magoun
- Born: June 17, 1775; Pembroke, Massachusetts, US
- Died: April 16, 1856 (aged 79); Medford, Massachusetts, US
- Occupation: Shipbuilder
- Known for: Thatcher Magoun (clipper)
- Spouse: Mary Bradshaw
- Children: 5

Thatcher Magoun (June 17, 1775 – April 16, 1856) was a shipbuilder who specialized in large ships and brigs, 250-tons and larger, built for the China trade. Magoun was called the "Father of Shipbuilding on the Mystic River." According to maritime historian Admiral Samuel Eliot Morison, Magoun's reputation was "second to none among American shipbuilders."

== Early life ==
Magoun was born in Pembroke, Massachusetts, on June 17, 1775. He became a ship carpenter and worked for Enos Briggs in Salem for five years. From Salem, he went to a yard in Charlestown (which became Boston Navy Yard), where he worked and studied two years, and assisted in modelling.

== Career ==
In 1803, Magoun established the first shipyard in Medford, Massachusetts next to the Mystic River, on what is known today as Riverside Avenue, opposite the end of Park Street. That same year, he laid the keel of his first vessel, the 188-ton Mt. Aetna, the model of which he had made a few years before.

Timber was procured from Medford, Maiden, Woburn, Burlington, Lexington, Stoneham, Andover, and their adjoining towns. Mr. Magoun's first purchase was trees standing in what is now Winchester, for six dollars per ton. It was more difficult to get white-oak plank. When the Middlesex Canal was opened, a supply came through that channel, and large rafts were floated into the river through a side lock, which was near the entrance of Medford Turnpike.

Magoun continued building ships at the Medford location until 1836. Eventually his yard was to be the only one in Medford with a shophouse.

In 1838, he established the mercantile firm Thatcher Magoun & Son in Boston, which became one of "the dominant shipping firms on the East Coast".

In 1851, B. F. Delano built two ships at the Magoun shipyard for W. W. Goddard, of Boston. Delano built the pilot boat William Starkey, a Boston schooner-rigged pilot boat, in 1854. The biggest ships built at the Thatcher Magoun shipyard at Medford were the 1,294-ton clipper ship Herald of the Morning and the 1,286-ton Kingfisher.

Magoun's ships traded throughout the world. He built 84 vessels over the course of his career, amassing significant wealth in international shipping and the Chincha Islands guano trade. Magoun specialized in big ships and brigs, which were 250-tons and larger in size, built for China trade.

== Family ==
Magoun's daughter, Susan Bradshaw Magoun (1812–1885), married William Adams (1807–1880). They had a daughter, Susan Magoun Adams (1848–1904) who married Eugene Delano (1844–1920). They had a son William Adams Delano (1874–1960), who was a member of the prominent Delano family of Massachusetts.

A namesake and descendant, Thatcher Magoun, became proprietor of the Thoreau House in Concord in 1894.

In 1894, the Adams grandchildren donated land to the city of Medford for Magoun Park.

== Legacy ==
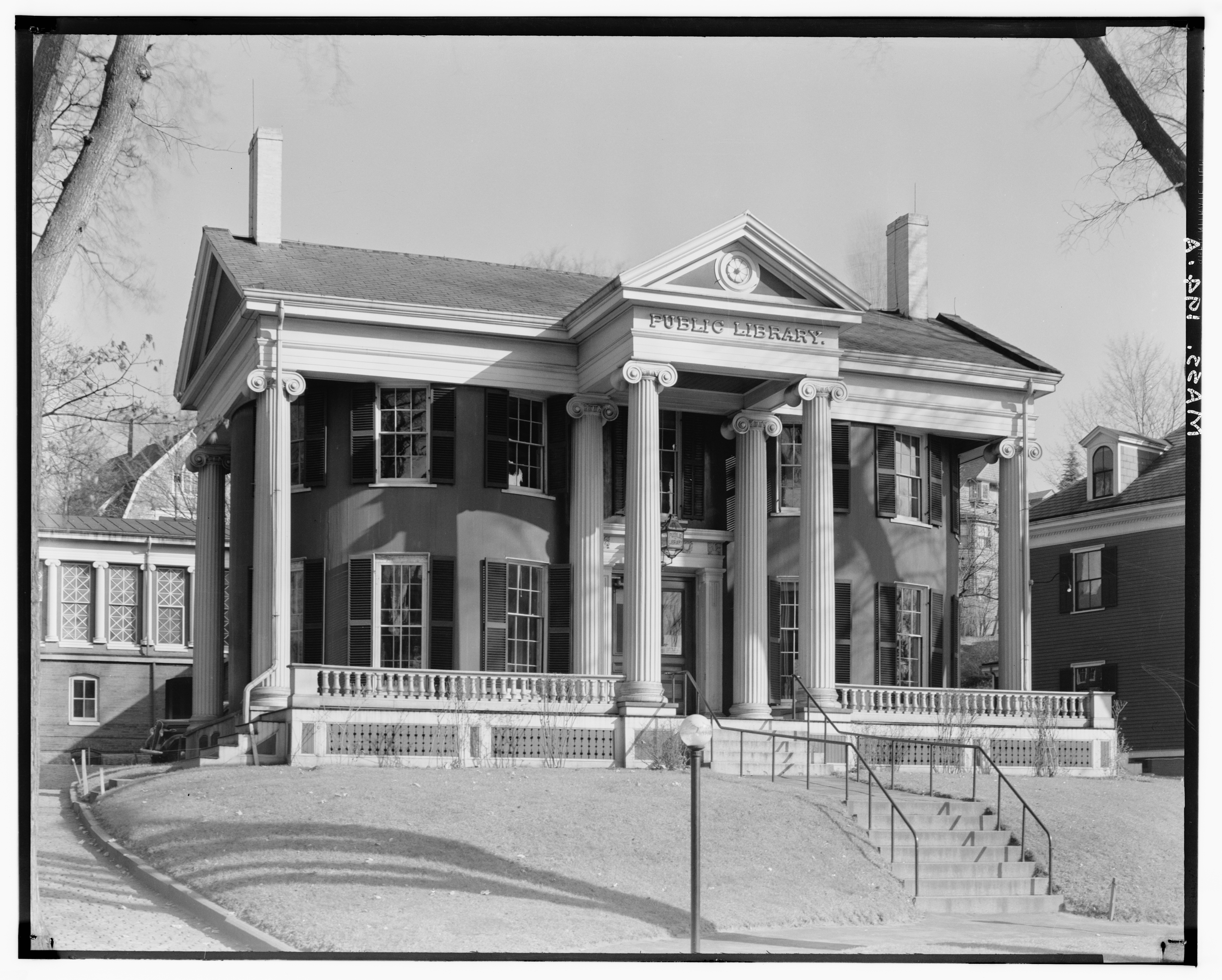
Thatcher Magoun House, 117 High Street, Medford, Massachusetts.

Magoun has been called "the Father of Shipbuilding on the Mystic River". His reputation was "second to none among American shipbuilders," according to Samuel Eliot Morison.

=== Distinguished successors ===
Magoun's son and grandson, Thatcher Magoun Jr. and Thatcher Magoun III, kept Magoun & Son going in the maritime trade until the late 1870s.

James O. Curtis and Paul Curtis, who apprenticed with Magoun, took over the shipyard from 1836-1839, as Curtis and Co., and went on to build a large number of well-known clipper ships. They were succeeded by Waterman & Ewell, and then by Hayden & Cudworth, who operated the yard from 1846 until a few years after the Civil War.

=== Thatcher Magoun House ===
Magoun built a mansion on High Street, Medford, Massachusetts. The front was built in a classical style, while the back was built with circular walls and low-studded rooms, like a ship's cabin, for Mr. Magoun's use. The house became the Medford Public Library in 1875, underwent major renovations in 1927, and was torn down to make space for a new library in 1959.

=== Clipper ship ===
The clipper ship Thatcher Magoun, launched in 1855, was named in his honor.

=== Historic sites ===
The housing built around Magoun's shipyard between 1803 and 1855 became Medford's Old Ship Street Historic District, and was added to the National Register of Historic Places in 1975.

Magoun's counting house, at 60 State Street in Boston, helped establish State Street as one of Boston's financial centers, and is commemorated today with a plaque.

== See also ==
- 60 State Street
- Old Ship Street Historic District
- Thatcher Magoun (Clipper)
