= 60 State Street =

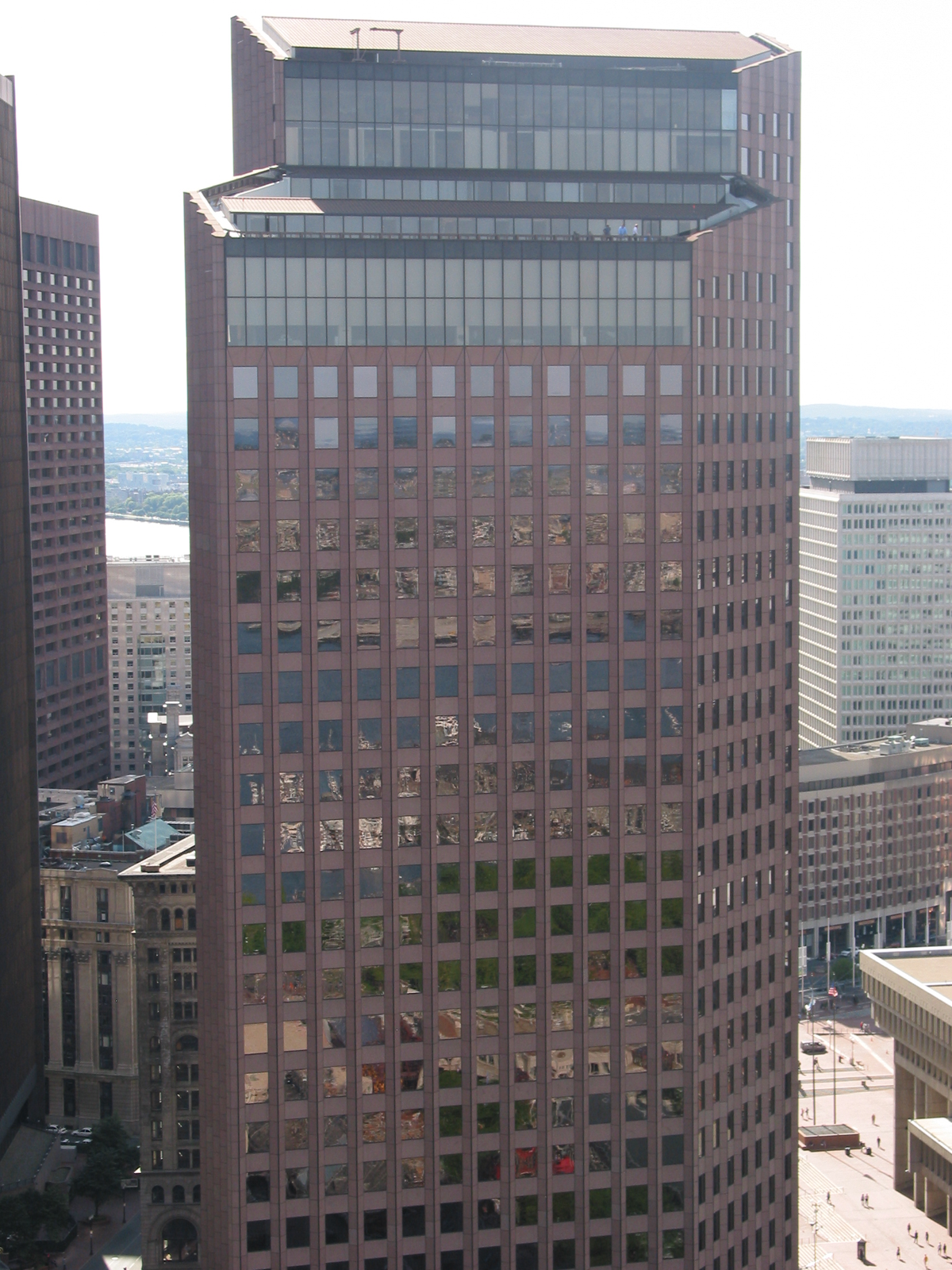
- Interactive map of the 60 State Street area

General information
- Type: Office
- Location: 60 State Street, Boston, Massachusetts
- Coordinates: 42.35903°N 71.05646°W
- Completed: 1977

Height
- Roof: 509 ft (155 m)

Technical details
- Floor count: 38
- Floor area: 823,009 sq ft (76,460.0 m^{2})

Design and construction
- Architect: Skidmore, Owings & Merrill
- Developer: EQ Office

60 State Street is a modern skyscraper on historic State Street in the Government Center neighborhood of Boston, Massachusetts. Completed in 1977, it is Boston's 19th tallest building, standing 509 feet (155 m) tall, and housing 38 floors.

== History ==
Sixty State Street marks the site of one of two colonial taverns named the Great Britain Coffee-House, where Queen Street (now Court Street) ended and King Street (now State Street) began. This Great Britain Coffee-House, established in 1713, advertised "superfine bohea, and green tea, chocolate, coffee-powder, etc."

In 1838, Thatcher Magoun Sr., a ship designer, builder and merchant who ran a shipbuilding facility in Medford, established Thatcher Magoun & Son, a counting-house, on the 60 State Street site to manage his business revenue, bookkeeping and correspondence. This helped to establish State Street as one of Boston's financial centers, thus initiating the city's Financial District. His son and grandson, Thatcher Magoun Jr. and Thatcher Magoun III, kept the firm going in the maritime trade until the late 1870s. An abstract from the firm's records reads:

Correspondence and business records including bills of lading, receipts, outfitting accounts, and crew lists, relating to the ships ARCHIMEDES, DEUCALION, ELECTRIC SPARK, GREENWICH, HERALD OF THE MORNING, MANLIUS, MEDFORD, PHARSALIA, SWALLOW, TALMA, THATCHER MAGOUN, TIMOLEON, and WITCHCRAFT, built in Magoun's yard in Medford, Mass., and engaged in trade between Boston, New York, San Francisco and foreign ports including Liverpool, Elsinore, Havana, and Hong Kong; and materials not specifically related to Thatcher Magoun & Son business enterprises: i.e. the records of B. Delano and Sons, a mercantile firm at Kingston, Mass., business papers of Daniel Tufts, and estate papers of James Nielson (managed by Thatcher Magoun). Includes correspondence with various shipmasters.

Upon Magoun Sr.'s death at 81 in 1856, the Thatcher Magoun, a clipper ship built by Hayden & Cudworth in Medford for Thatcher Magoun & Sons, was named and launched in his memory. Author Hall Gleason described the clipper as follows: "Her figurehead was a life-like image of the father of ship building on the Mystic... She made five passages from Boston to S.F., the fastest being 113 days and the slowest 152 days; seven from N.Y. to S.F., fastest 117 and slowest 149; two from Liverpool in 150 and 115 days. The average of the fourteen is 128.7 days. S.F. to NY. in 96 days in 1869."

== Design and features ==
=== Architecture ===
Designed by the Chicago-based firm of Skidmore, Owings & Merrill and developed by Cabot, Cabot & Forbes, 60 State Street is clad in pink granite to blend in with the red brick of Faneuil Hall, City Hall Plaza and other neighboring buildings and spaces. The granite-clad triangular pillars alternate with vertical banks of rectangular floor-to-ceiling windows in a pattern similar to that of Eero Saarinen's black granite-faced CBS Building, a.k.a. "Black Rock," in New York City.

Also like Black Rock, 60 State Street is surrounded by a pedestrian plaza; the plaza is raised rather than sunken and is accessible at street level from State Street and by two flights of stairs from Faneuil Hall Marketplace.

Unlike Black Rock's rectangular solid composition, 60 State Street was given eleven sides and a two-part scheme so that it has the appearance of side-by-side octagonal tubes from a distance. The chamfered corner pillars are similarly octagonal. This theme recalls Boston's historic architectural motif of chamfered bay windows on Beacon Hill and in the Back Bay.

=== Venues and tenants ===
The main office of a major international law firm, WilmerHale, is located at 60 State Street. Also located in the same building is Lewis Brisbois Bisgaard & Smith.

The building is shared with Good Measures and is the corporate headquarters for the company. The building also served as the corporate headquarters of the Sheraton Hotel group from 1978 until they were acquired by Starwood Hotels and Resorts in 1998.

The State Room is located in the building's elegant space on the 33rd floor, the site of the former Bay Tower Room restaurant. The State Room run by Longwood Venues hosts private functions (such as weddings, corporate events) and offers panoramic views of Boston Harbor, the Financial District, Boston Common, the Massachusetts State House, the Charles River and the Mystic River. In 2009, the American Idol Preliminary round for Boston was held here.

A Bank of America branch is at street level, with ATMs located at the intersection of Congress Street and State Street, where Boston's Financial District begins. Next to Bank of America, there is a headhouse for Blue and Orange Line. Berkshire Bank announced 60 State Street as their new corporate headquarters in late 2017.

To the rear of 60 State facing Congress Street, adjacent to the Faneuil Hall building and statue of Samuel Adams sits a Samuel Adams Beer Tap room on the building's ground level.

== See also ==
- List of tallest buildings in Boston
