= Old Ship Street Historic District =

Historic district in Massachusetts, United States

- U.S. National Register of Historic Places
- U.S. Historic district
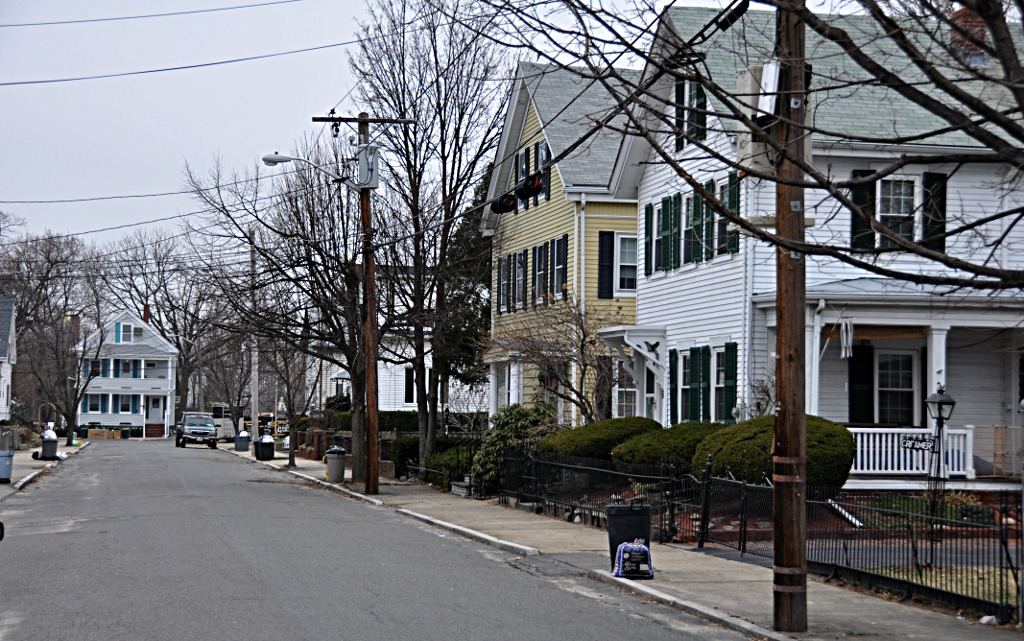
- Pleasant Street

- Location within Massachusetts Location within the United States
- Location: Medford, Massachusetts
- Coordinates: 42°24′59″N 71°6′6″W
- Built: 1828
- Architect: Ellis, Robert; Et al.
- Architectural style: Greek Revival
- NRHP reference No.: 75000279
- Added to NRHP: April 14, 1975

The Old Ship Street Historic District is a historic district on both sides of Pleasant St. from Riverside Ave. to Park Street in Medford, Massachusetts. The district is based around the shipyard established in 1803 by Thatcher Magoun, which operated into the 1870s. None of the industrial shipyard facilities have survived, leaving the area as a predominantly residential area. Most of the housing in the area derives from the first few decades of the shipyard's existence, resulting in a significant number of Federal and Greek Revival houses, built roughly between 1803 and 1855.

The district was added to the National Register of Historic Places in 1975.

== See also ==
- National Register of Historic Places listings in Medford, Massachusetts
- National Register of Historic Places listings in Middlesex County, Massachusetts
