= USS Lenoir (AKA-74) =

Cargo ship of the United States Navy

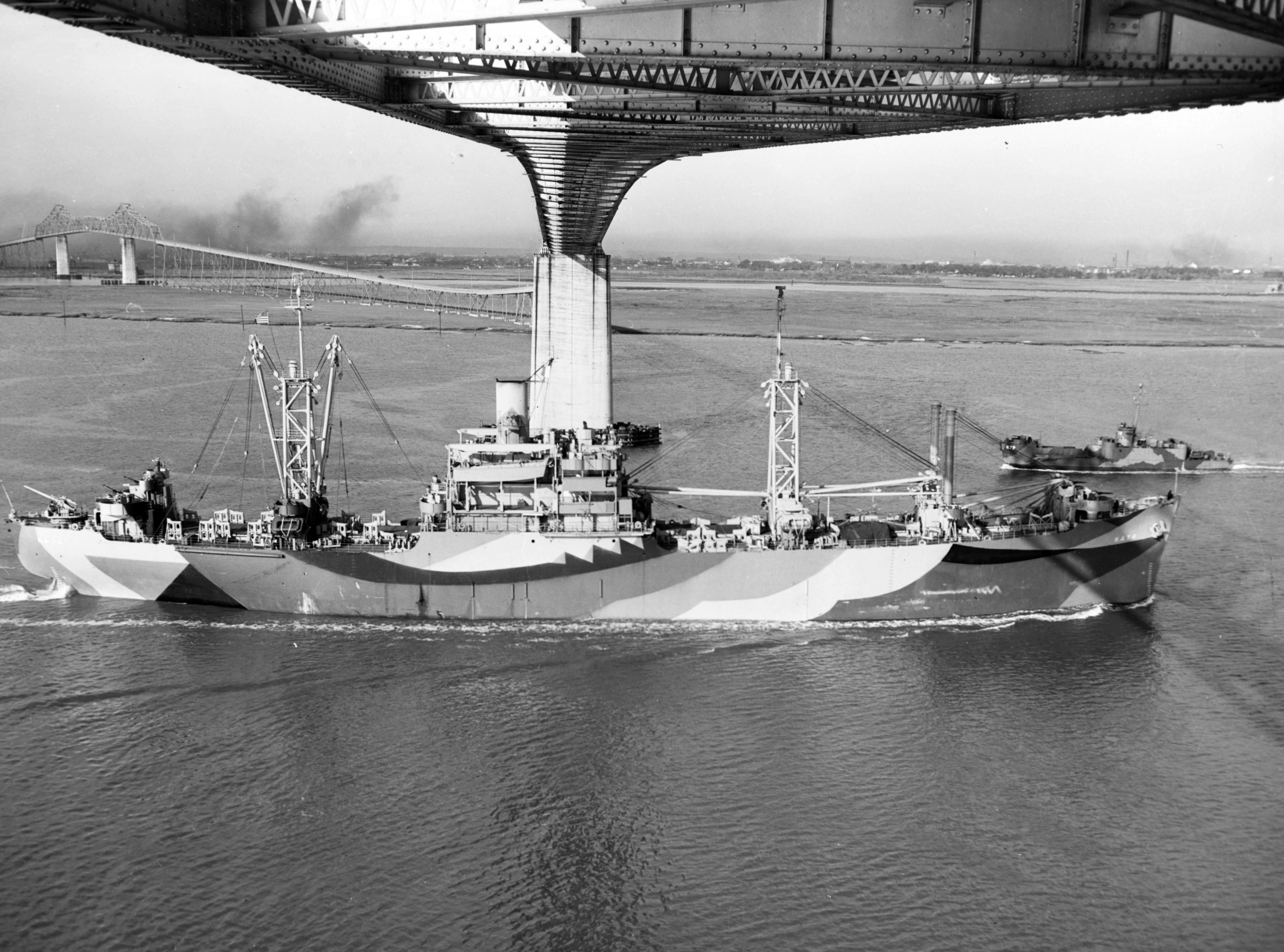
- USS Lenoir (AKA-74)

History

United States
- Name: USS Lenoir
- Namesake: Lenoir County, North Carolina
- Builder: North Carolina Shipbuilding Company, Wilmington, North Carolina
- Laid down: 7 September 1944
- Launched: 6 November 1944
- Commissioned: 14 December 1944
- Decommissioned: 13 June 1946
- Renamed: SS Margaret Lykes; SS Gulf Merchant; SS Del Aires; SS Columbia Tiger; SS Antillian Tiger
- Honors and awards: 1 battle star (World War II)
- Fate: Sold into merchant service, 1 October 1947; Scrapped 1971

General characteristics
- Class & type: Tolland-class attack cargo ship
- Displacement: 13,910 long tons (14,133 t) full
- Length: 459 ft 2 in (139.95 m)
- Beam: 63 ft (19 m)
- Draft: 26 ft 4 in (8.03 m)
- Propulsion: GE geared turbine drive, single propeller, 6,000 hp (4.5 MW)
- Speed: 16.5 knots (30.6 km/h; 19.0 mph)
- Range: 17,000 miles
- Boats & landing craft carried: 14 × LCVP; 8 × LCM
- Capacity: 380,000 ft³ (11.000 m³), 5,275 tons
- Complement: 247
- Armament: 1 × 5"/38 caliber gun; 4 × twin 40 mm guns; 16 × 20 mm guns

USS Lenoir (AKA-74) was a Tolland-class attack cargo ship in service with the United States Navy from 1944 to 1946. She was sold into commercial service and was scrapped in 1971.

== History ==
Lenoir was named after Lenoir County, North Carolina and the distant City of Lenoir, North Carolina, which are both named for the patriot William Lenoir. . She was laid down by North Carolina Shipbuilding Co., Wilmington, North Carolina, on 7 September 1944; launched under United States Maritime Commission contract on 6 November 1944; sponsored by Mrs. John M. Kerr; acquired and commissioned on 14 December 1944.

=== World War II, 1945 ===
Lenoir departed Norfolk on 21 January 1945 and arrived Pearl Harbor on 20 February. After touching Eniwetok on 22 to 25 March, she sailed from Ulithi on 13 April for the Okinawa landings, arriving off Hagushi beach on 17 April. Within 72 hours she had discharged her cargo; though coming under air attack, she sustained no battle damage. She then voyaged to Saipan, Guadalcanal, and Guam, and arrived San Francisco on 10 July.

=== Post-war activities, 1945–1946 ===
The ship returned to Pearl Harbor on 25 August to embark men of the Army 6th Division for Japan, arriving there on 22 October. She departed on 4 November for Portland, Oregon, arriving the 18th. The ship next sailed from Alameda, California, for Qingdao, China, and Jinsen, Korea, on a "Magic Carpet" voyage.

=== Decommissioning and fate ===
She returned to San Francisco on 11 March 1946, sailed on to Norfolk, and was decommissioned there on 13 June 1946. Returned to the United States Maritime Commission on 14 June 1946, she was sold on 1 October 1947 to Lykes Brothers Steamship Company, and operated out of Tampa, Florida as SS Margaret Lykes. Resold the same year to the Gulf & South American Steamship Company, she was renamed SS Gulf Merchant. After 17 years of service she was sold again (5 November 1964) to Delta Steamship Company and named SS Del Aires. Delta sold her on 28 June 1968 to Columbia Steamship Company who named her SS Columbia Tiger. On 9 September 1970 she was reflagged to the Netherlands and named SS Antillian Tiger. Sometime in 1971, the ship was sold for the last time and broken up for scrap.

== Awards ==
Lenoir received one battle star for World War II service.
