= Challenger (1853 clipper) =

Ship built in East Boston

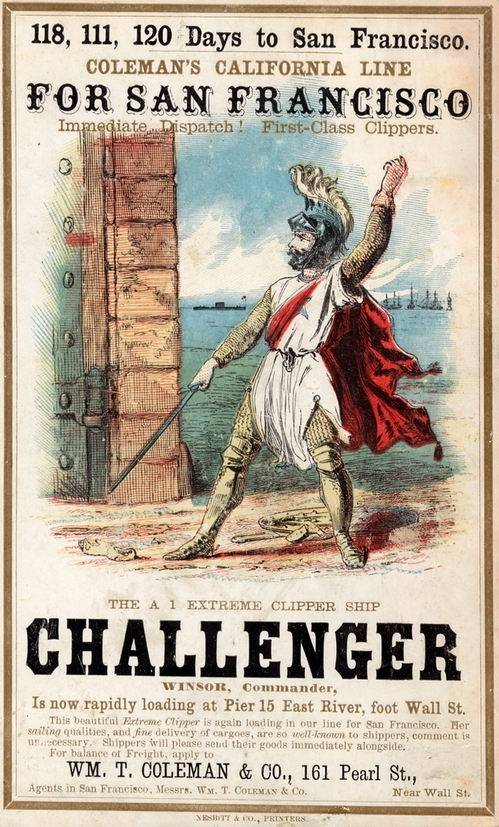
- Challenger

History

United States
- Name: Challenger
- Owner: W. & F.H. Whittemore, Boston; later, Samuel G. Reed & Co.
- Builder: Robert E. Jackson, East Boston, MA
- Launched: 1853
- Notes: Collided with Roswell Sprague in a gale at Bremerhaven, October 1861

Peru
- Owner: N. Larco, agent for the Peruvian Government
- Acquired: 1863
- Renamed: Camille Cavour
- Fate: Abandoned off the coast of Mexico, October 1875, en route from Port Discovery to Peru, after damage during a gale. Camille Cavour's wreck drifted ashore at Manzanillo.
- Notes: Coolie ship in the guano trade

General characteristics
- Class & type: Extreme clipper, designed by Samuel Hartt Pook
- Tons burthen: 1334 tons
- Length: 206 ft (63 m)
- Beam: 38 ft 4 in (11.68 m)
- Draft: 23 ft (7.0 m)

Challenger was an extreme clipper ship built in East Boston in 1853. She sailed in the San Francisco trade, and later in the guano trade in Peru.

== Voyages ==
Between 1854 and 1863, Challenger made two voyages from Boston to San Francisco, in 112 and 134 days, and five voyages from New York to San Francisco, in 115 to 133 days. In 1861, she "collided with the ship Roswell Sprague in a gale in the roadstead of Bremerhaven".

== Guano trade and shipwreck ==
In 1863, Challenger was sold to the Peruvian Government, and renamed Camille Cavour. She was "used in the transport of Chinese coolies to the guano islands".

In 1875, she was "damaged in a gale on voyage from Port Discovery to Peru and was abandoned off the coast of Mexico. The wreck drifted ashore at Manzanillo."
