= Manzanillo, Colima =

- City
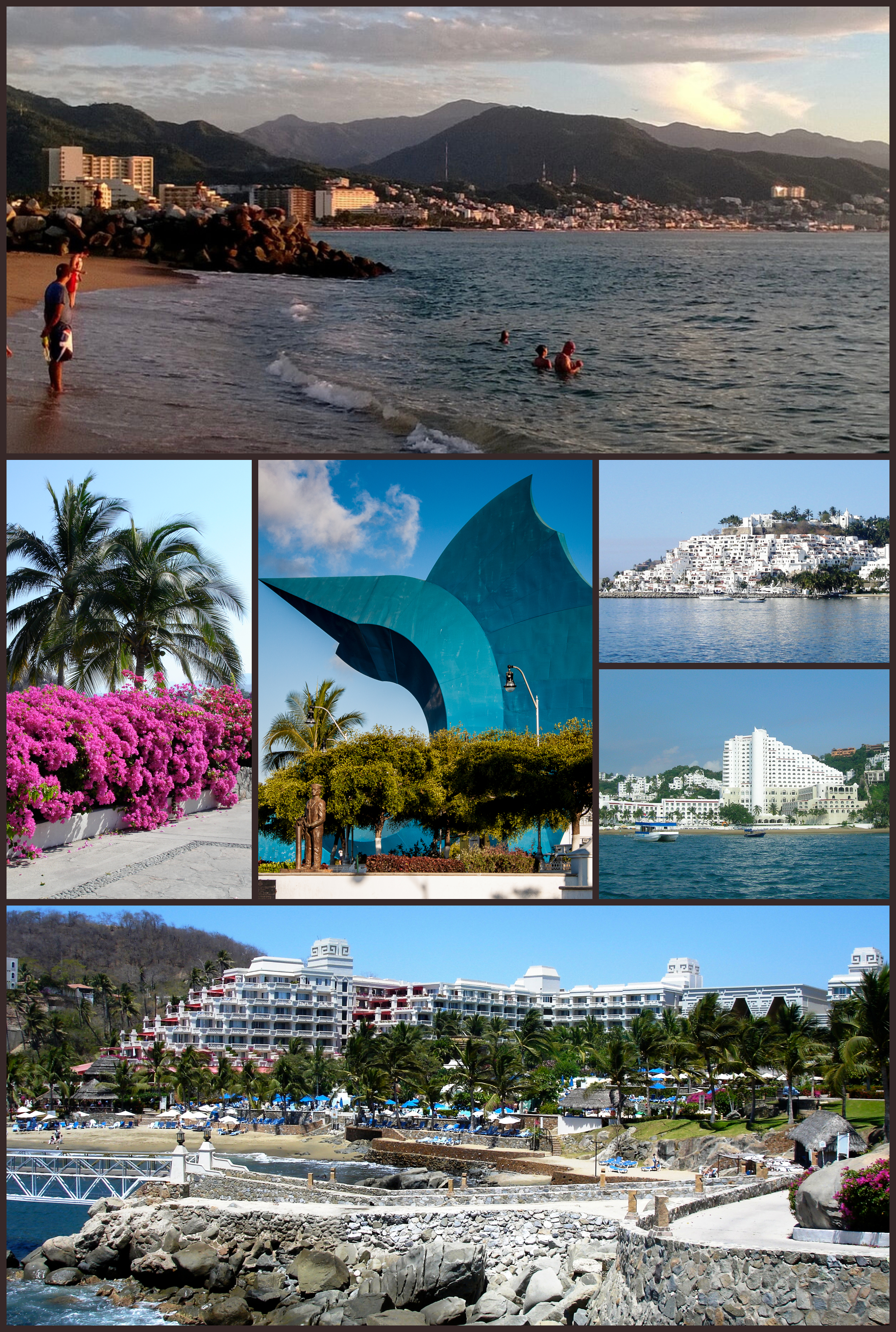
- Top: Santiago Bay in Manzanillo, Middle: Mandevillas and Palm Trees, Sculpture "Pez Vela", La Punta, Tesoro Manzanillo Hotel, Bottom: Barceló Karmina

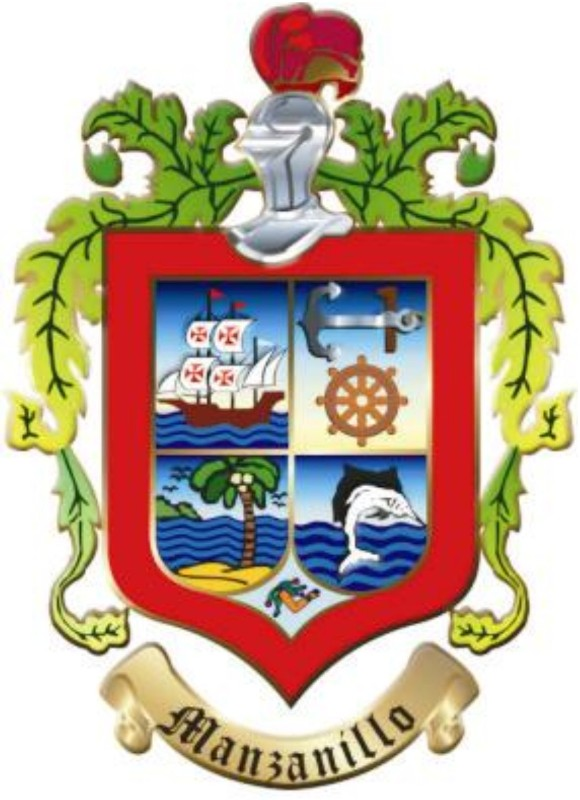
- Seal

- Location in Mexico Manzanillo, Colima (Mexico)
- Coordinates: 19°03′08″N 104°18′57″W
- Country: Mexico
- State: Colima
- Municipality: Manzanillo

Government
  - Mayor: Griselda Martinez Martinez (MORENA)

Area
  - Municipality: 1,578.4 km^{2} (609.4 sq mi)
- Elevation: 20 m (66 ft)

Population (2020)
  - Total: 159,853
- Time zone: UTC−6 (CST)
- Postal code: 28200 through 28887
- Website: www.manzanillo.gob.mx

Manzanillo (/ˌmænzəˈniːoʊ/, /ˌmɑːn-/; Spanish pronunciation: [mansaˈniʝo]) is the most populous city in the Mexican state of Colima and seat of Manzanillo Municipality. The city, located on the Pacific Ocean, contains Mexico's busiest port, responsible for handling Pacific cargo for the Mexico City area. It is the largest-producing municipality for the business sector and tourism in the small state of Colima. Recent data from DataMexico indicates that Manzanillo has relatively young workforce, with high economic participation in service, retail, and logistics industries connected to the city's port activity.

The city has been referred to as the "sailfish capital of the world". Since 1957, it has hosted national and international fishing competitions, such as the Dorsey Tournament. Manzanillo has developed as a destination for international tourism.

== History ==
16th century

In 1522, Gonzalo de Sandoval, under orders from conquistador Hernán Cortés, dropped anchor in the Bay of Salagua (north of Manzanillo Bay), looking for safe harbors and good shipbuilding sites. In the year before he left, Sandoval granted an audience to local Native chieftains in a small cove, which today carries the name Playa de La Audiencia. A great part of his fleet, which left to conquer the Philippines, was constructed in Salagua.

Manzanillo Bay was discovered in 1527 by navigator Alvaro de Saavedra, naming it Santiago de la Buena Esperanza, or "St. James of Good Hope". Manzanillo was the third port created by the Spanish in the Viceroyalty of New Spain. It became a departure point for important expeditions. Cortés visited the bay twice to protect his galleons from Portuguese pirates. Over the next 300 years, the Pacific Coast's history is filled with accounts of pirates from Portugal, England, France and even Spain assaulting, looting and burning ships for their rich cargos.

19th century

In 1825 the Port of Manzanillo opened, in recently independent Mexico, and so named because of the abundant groves of native Manzanilla (Hippomane mancinella) trees that were used extensively in the early days of shipbuilding. Manzanillo was raised to the status of a city on 15 June 1873. The railroad to Colima was completed in 1889.

20th century

In 1908, President Porfirio Diaz designated Manzanillo as an official port of entry to Mexico. It was the state capital of Colima from 20 February to 1 March 1915, while Pancho Villa's troops were threatening to capture the city of Colima.

21st century

The expansion of the Port of Manzanillo in the Central Pacific Coast state of Colima, Mexico, represents a significant investment expected to enhance Mexico's position in global trade. In January 2026, Manzanillo hosted a major international triathlon event that brought athletes from across Mexico and abroad. The competition took place along Playa Miramar and the Los Arcos area, with support from the Undersecretary of Tourism.

== Description ==
In the 2005 census, the city of Manzanillo had a population of 110,728 and in 2010 its municipality had 161,420. In 2020, Manzanillo had 191,031 residents, with 49.8% men and 50.2% women. This was an 18.3% increase from the population in 2010. It is the second-largest community in the state, after Colima, the capital. The municipality covers an area of 1,578.4 km^{2} (609.42 sq mi), and includes such outlying communities as El Colomo, in addition to many smaller communities. Manzanillo is also a beach resort, and is one of many locations to promote themselves as the "sailfish capital" of the world. One way they promote that claim is by hosting a yearly sailfish fishing tournament. The Revillagigedo Islands, off the west coast of Mexico in the Pacific Ocean, are part of the municipality, but they are directly administered by the federal government.

Manzanillo is a sister city of the U.S. cities of Flagstaff, Arizona; San Pablo, California; and Saint Paul, Minnesota.

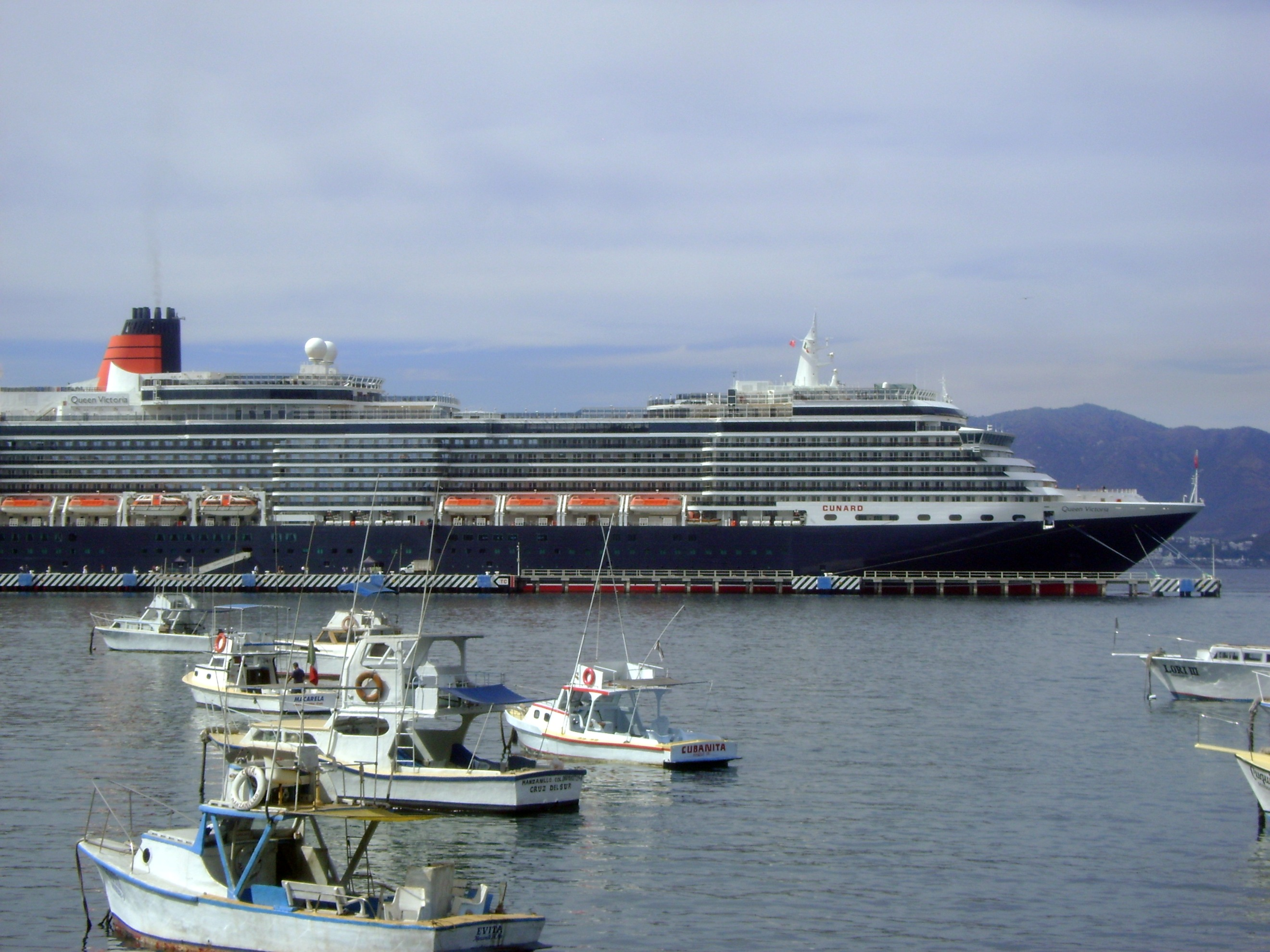
MS Queen Victoria at Manzanillo.

== Tourism ==
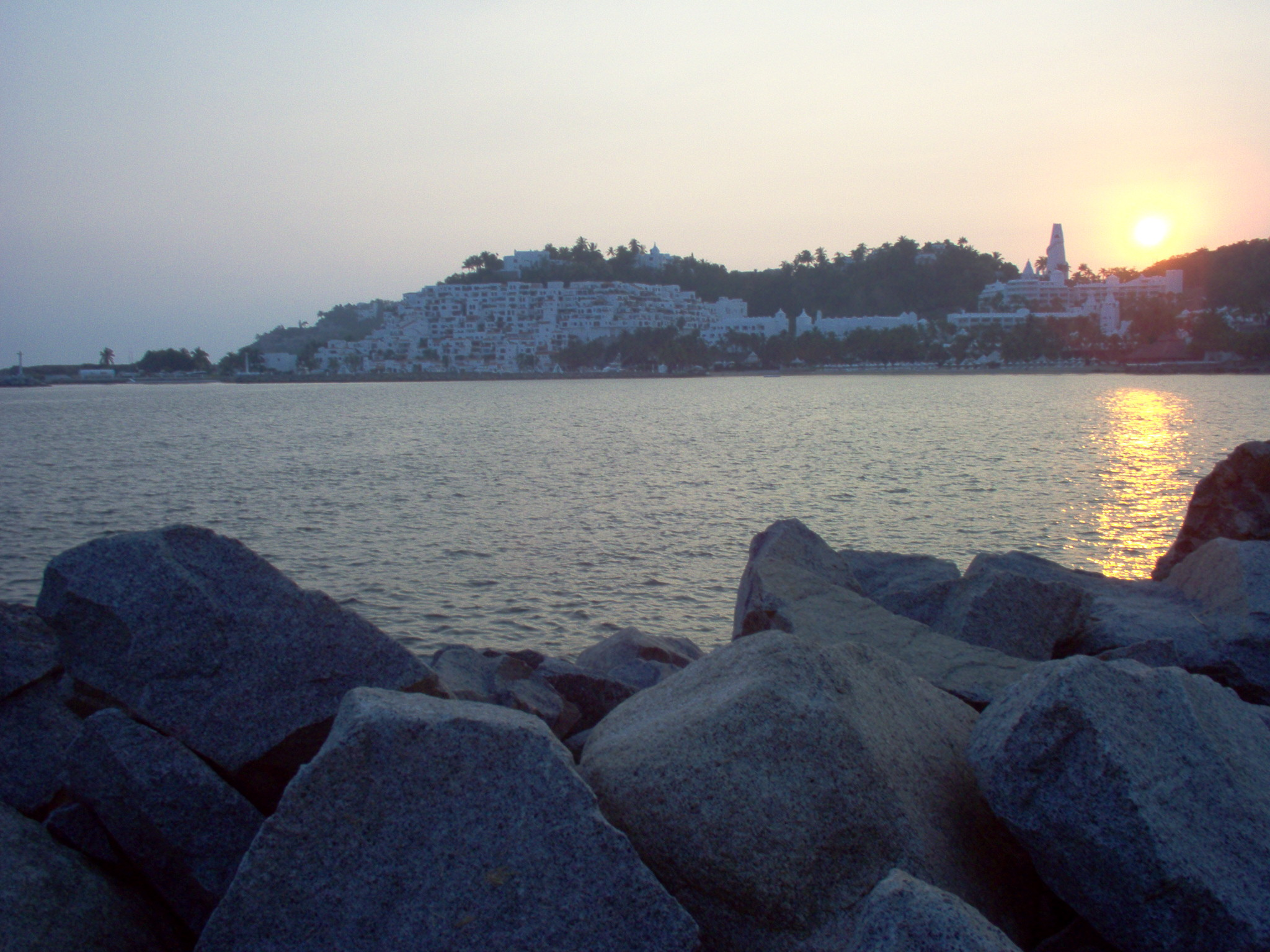
Bahía de Manzanillo

The city is well known internationally for deep-sea fishing and the green flash phenomenon during sunsets, as well as the warm waters of the ocean. The city is a destination resort and has many hotels and self-contained resorts, particularly built on the De Santiago peninsula which juts out into the Pacific north of the city centre. Also at the north end of Manzanillo bay is the resort Las Hadas ("the fairies"), which is the most famous of the city's resorts, having been featured in the movie 10 starring Bo Derek and Dudley Moore. Beach scenes were filmed on La Audencia Bay, just over the hill from Las Hadas. Manzanillo is a popular cruise ship port of call. Many tourists go from their cruise ships on city tours. The city's coastal geography includes Playa Miramar and the Los Arcos area, which serve as major public gathering and event locations. Excellent swimming, snorkeling, and scuba diving is found in Santiago Bay, a few miles north of the city where a cargo ship sank in a hurricane in 1959. Other wrecks and reefs plentiful with fish are scattered throughout the bay. SS Golden Gate sank in 1862 in nearby Playa de Oro, which is named after the huge cargo of gold she was carrying. Optimists still search for gold on the beach.

Manzanillo is known as the Sailfish Capital of the World. Since 1957, it has hosted important national and international fishing competitions, such as the Dorsey Tournament, making it a very attractive fishing destination.

Manzanillo consists of two bays with crescent-shaped beaches, each about 4 miles in length. Bahía de Manzanillo is closer to downtown and is the older tourist section. Bahía de Santiago, to the west, is the newer and more upscale area. The two are separated by the Santiago Peninsula. Ship channels are located at the southeast end of Bahía de Manzanillo where large cruise ships enter the port area. Manzanillo was once the scene of piracy and adventure. Manzanillo is also a port of call for cruise ships, and its historic center includes restaurants and public spaces frequently visited by travelers. By 2011, its peaceful bays and sophisticated tourist and port infrastructure had made it one of the main tourist resorts and trading centers in the west of Mexico.

On 6 July 2010, the Secretariat of Communications and Transportation (Secretaría de Comunicaciones y Transportes) opened a specialized dock for cruise ships at the port, which involved an investment of $100 million pesos (MXN) in the first stage. A second phase foresees the construction of a shopping centre.

== Culture ==
Traditional dishes from Colima, especially in places like Manzanillo, show the region's unique food culture. A 2025 study found that dishes like tatemado, pozole seco, and pipián are still popular with people of all ages and backgrounds.

Indigenous groups in the Colima region, such as the Nahua and Otomi communities, have significantly shaped the cultural identity of contemporary Manzanillo. The 2020 Population and Housing Census reports that 596 Manzanillo residents, or 0.31% of the population, speak an Indigenous language. The most common are Zapoteco (222 speakers), Náhuatl (178), and Otomí (41).

People moving to Manzanillo in recent years have made the city more culturally diverse. In the last five years, most new residents from other countries came from the United States (241 people), Venezuela (58), and Germany (33). The main reason peopl gave from moving were to join family and find housing.

== Geography ==
=== Climate ===
Manzanillo has a tropical savanna climate (Köppen climate classification Aw). The dry season, which is from November to May, has low amounts of precipitation, and temperatures tend to be cooler than in the wet season. The average temperature in March, the coolest month, is 24 °C (75 °F). The wet season, which runs from June to October, has warmer temperatures, averaging 28.3 °C (83 °F) in July, and humidity during this time is higher.

In 2012, the port of Manzanillo initiated an ecological project consisting of dredged canals and creating islands in the Lagoon of the Valle de las Garzas, a protected wildlife area. With this work, the port plans to increase the flow into the lagoon, thus increasing the viability of the enhanced ecosystem that includes the planting of 15,000 mangrove trees. Extensive use of geotextile tubes was included in the channel creation. These geotextile tubes were used to create two parallel breakwaters on either side of the dredged channels.

Climate data for Manzanillo (1991–2020, extremes 1951–2020)
Month	Jan	Feb	Mar	Apr	May	Jun	Jul	Aug	Sep	Oct	Nov	Dec	Year
Record high °C (°F)	36.5 (97.7)	34.2 (93.6)	36.6 (97.9)	35.4 (95.7)	39.4 (102.9)	39.1 (102.4)	39.2 (102.6)	39.0 (102.2)	37.3 (99.1)	39.0 (102.2)	36.0 (96.8)	35.1 (95.2)	39.4 (102.9)
Mean daily maximum °C (°F)	29.9 (85.8)	29.6 (85.3)	29.7 (85.5)	29.7 (85.5)	30.9 (87.6)	32.1 (89.8)	32.8 (91.0)	32.8 (91.0)	31.8 (89.2)	32.0 (89.6)	31.4 (88.5)	30.2 (86.4)	31.1 (88.0)
Daily mean °C (°F)	25.5 (77.9)	25.1 (77.2)	25.0 (77.0)	25.2 (77.4)	27.0 (80.6)	28.7 (83.7)	29.3 (84.7)	29.2 (84.6)	28.5 (83.3)	28.5 (83.3)	27.5 (81.5)	26.1 (79.0)	27.1 (80.8)
Mean daily minimum °C (°F)	21.0 (69.8)	20.6 (69.1)	20.3 (68.5)	20.7 (69.3)	23.1 (73.6)	25.3 (77.5)	25.7 (78.3)	25.6 (78.1)	25.2 (77.4)	25.1 (77.2)	23.6 (74.5)	21.9 (71.4)	23.2 (73.8)
Record low °C (°F)	12.5 (54.5)	10.4 (50.7)	12.4 (54.3)	15.7 (60.3)	16.1 (61.0)	18.8 (65.8)	17.6 (63.7)	20.2 (68.4)	20.6 (69.1)	19.3 (66.7)	18.5 (65.3)	14.5 (58.1)	10.4 (50.7)
Average precipitation mm (inches)	32.5 (1.28)	18.7 (0.74)	7.6 (0.30)	0.1 (0.00)	8.1 (0.32)	109.6 (4.31)	153.8 (6.06)	186.2 (7.33)	251.7 (9.91)	116.3 (4.58)	40.9 (1.61)	9.9 (0.39)	935.4 (36.83)
Average precipitation days (≥ 0.1 mm)	1.5	1.0	0.4	0.1	0.8	7.3	9.5	11.5	12.9	6.9	1.7	0.8	54.4
Average relative humidity (%)	71.5	72.2	73.8	75.4	76.4	76.5	75.8	77.5	80.3	79.6	77.2	74.1	75.9
Mean monthly sunshine hours	234.9	238.9	284.9	276.1	268.8	205.5	198.8	203.9	197.6	225.2	228.4	228.9	2,791.8
Source 1: Servicio Meteorológico Nacional
Source 2: NOAA NCEI (humidity, sun 1991-2020), Colegio de Postgraduados (extremes 1951-1980)

Manzanillo mean sea temperature
Jan	Feb	Mar	Apr	May	Jun	Jul	Aug	Sep	Oct	Nov	Dec
27 °C (81 °F)	26 °C (79 °F)	26 °C (79 °F)	27 °C (81 °F)	28 °C (82 °F)	28 °C (82 °F)	29 °C (84 °F)	30 °C (86 °F)	29 °C (84 °F)	29 °C (84 °F)	29 °C (84 °F)	28 °C (82 °F)

== Hurricane Patricia ==
On Friday, 23 October 2015, Manzanillo was caught in the path of Hurricane Patricia. A Category 5 on the Saffir Simpson Hurricane wind scale, it was the most powerful cyclone ever measured in the Western Hemisphere, with sustained winds speed up to 200 mph (320 km/h). Hurricane Patricia made landfall on 23 October at 7:45pm with catastrophic damage. The center of the storm hit just north of Manzanillo, saving the town from the 200 mph winds. Puerto Vallarta was also near the catastrophic damage zone. Wind and high surf created a catastrophic damage zone. Damage totaled at least $283 million.

== Transportation ==
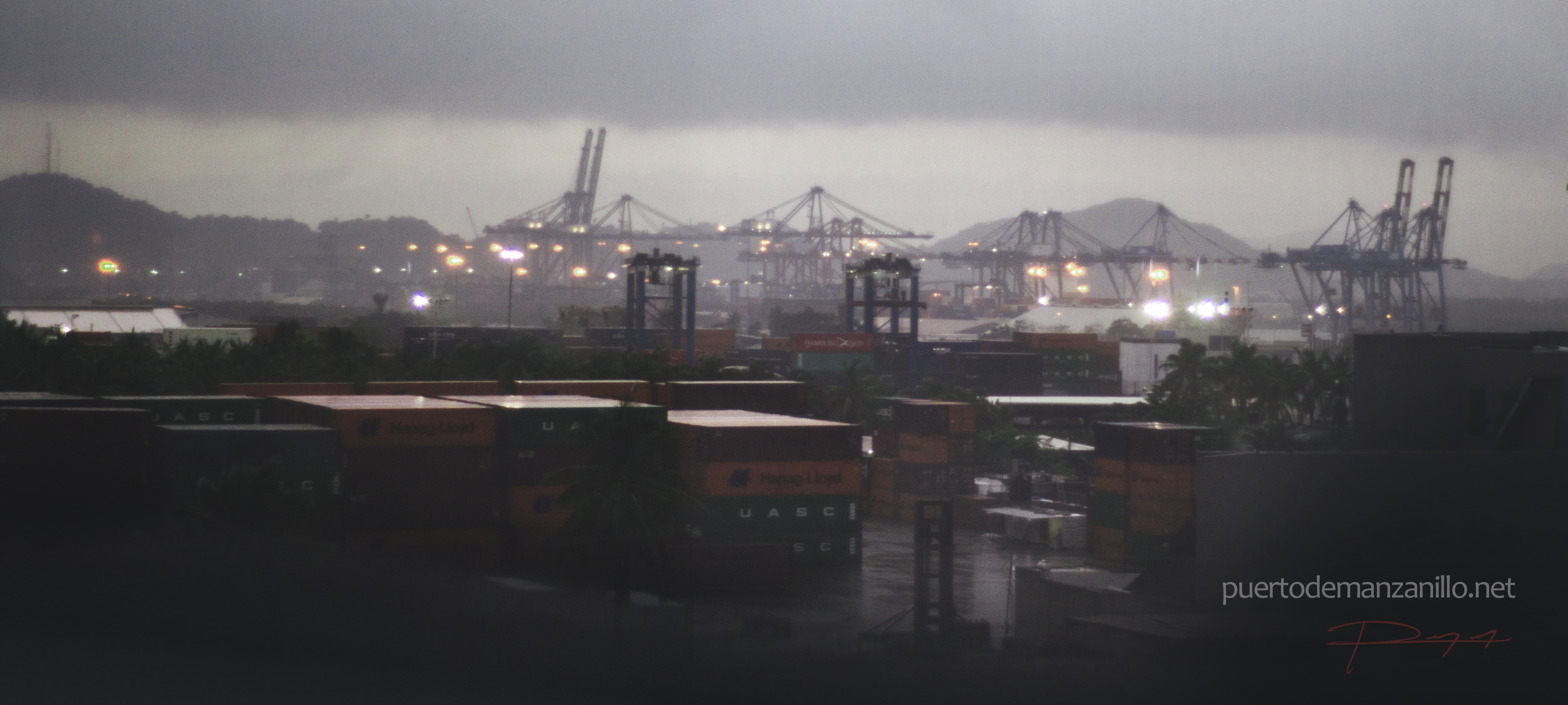

Manzanillo is the busiest port in Mexico, as measured by total tonnage and volume of containerized cargo. In 2007, the port moved 1.4 million TEUs and 18.0 million tons of total cargo. Port business experienced a significant surge during the USA's West Coast Lockout in Long Beach, California, in 2002. The port is connected by Ferromex rail lines to Guadalajara and Mexico City.

Manzanillo is also home to the Navy's Pacific Naval Force. Manzanillo also hosts the most efficient port for tuna landings in Mexico. It handles exports like fish, corn, copra, lemons, bananas, canned foods, wine, lumber, and minerals.

Manzanillo is well connected by Highway 200 to Colima City, to the Northwest and to Puerto Vallarta.

The Playa de Oro International Airport (ZLO) is a small airport located about 35 minutes north of Manzanillo along Highway 200. The airport offers international and national flights. In addition to flights to and from the US, the airport has international service to and from Canada. The airport is operated by "Grupo Aeroportuario del Pacifico". Ground transportation is limited to taxis and car rentals. It has daily domestic and international flights and has recently been remodeled.

== Sister cities ==
- Minnesota, USA Saint Paul, Minnesota, United States
- Arizona, USA Flagstaff, Arizona, United States
- California, USA San Pablo, California, United States
- Santiago de Chile, Región Metropolitana de Santiago
- Ningbo, China
- Valparaíso, Chile Región de Valparaíso
- Weihai, China

== See also ==
- Challenger (1853 clipper)
