= USS Tyrrell =

Cargo ship of the United States Navy

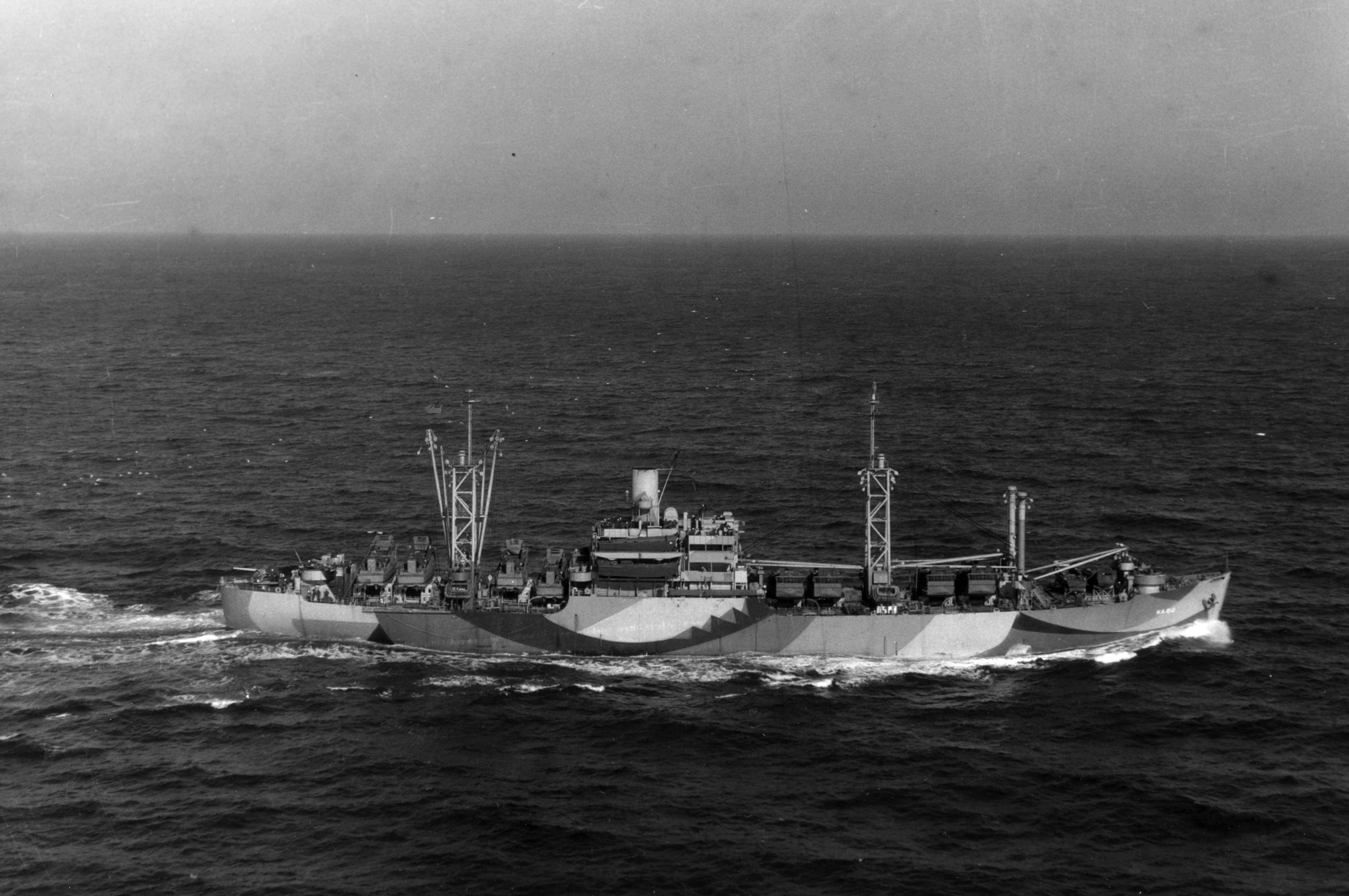

History

United States
- Name: USS Tyrrell
- Namesake: Tyrrell County, North Carolina
- Builder: North Carolina Shipbuilding Company, Wilmington, North Carolina
- Laid down: 6 May 1944
- Commissioned: 4 December 1944
- Decommissioned: 19 April 1946
- Renamed: SS California Bear; SS America Bear; SS Green Lake; SS Oceanic Cloud
- Stricken: 1 May 1946
- Honors and awards: 1 battle star (World War II)
- Fate: Scrapped, 1967

General characteristics
- Class & type: Tolland-class attack cargo ship
- Displacement: 14,160 long tons (14,387 t) full
- Length: 459 ft 2 in (139.95 m)
- Beam: 63 ft (19 m)
- Draft: 26 ft 4 in (8.03 m)
- Speed: 16.5 knots (30.6 km/h; 19.0 mph)
- Complement: 395
- Armament: 1 × 5"/38 caliber gun; 4 × twin 40 mm guns; 16 × 20 mm guns

USS Tyrrell (AKA-80) was a Tolland-class attack cargo ship in service with the United States Navy from 1944 to 1946. She was sold into commercial service and was scrapped in 1967.

== History ==
Tyrrell was named after Tyrrell County, North Carolina. She was laid down on 6 May 1944 as a Type C2-S-AJ3 ship under Maritime Commission contract (MC hull 1387) at Wilmington, North Carolina, by the North Carolina Shipbuilding Co.; transferred to the Navy on 30 July and towed to Baltimore on 8 August for conversion to an attack cargo ship by the Key Highway plant of the Bethlehem Steel Co.; and commissioned on 4 December 1944.

=== World War II, 1945 ===
After shakedown training in the Virginia Capes area, the attack cargo ship departed Hampton Roads on 5 January 1945 and steamed through the Panama Canal to Hawaii. After spending the last week of the month in Pearl Harbor, the ship embarked 33 Navy passengers and proceeded, via Eniwetok, to the Carolines and discharged her passengers at Ulithi on 13 February. Two days later, she proceeded via the Palaus to the Philippines. After her arrival in Leyte Gulf on 21 February, the ship commenced preparations for the assault on the Ryukyus.

At dawn on 1 April 1945, the Southern Attack Force, to which Tyrrell was attached, arrived off Hagushi, Okinawa. At 0550, as battleships, cruisers, and destroyers commenced bombardment of Japanese defenses — Tyrrell began lowering her boats. By 0644, the last of her landing craft was in the water and headed for the beach.

For the next nine days, Tyrrell remained off Okinawa, supporting the conquest of that island stronghold. On 2 April, a twin-engined Japanese bomber attempted to crash the ship, diving through a storm of anti-aircraft fire. In an attempt to ram the bridge, the aircraft sheared off the ship's main radio antenna, hit the lower yardarm support on the starboard side of the mainmast, and continued on to sideswipe the starboard 5-ton cargo boom at the number 5 hatch. As the aircraft crashed alongside, it blew up and showered the cargo ship's decks with pieces of wreckage.

On 4 April, heavy cruiser Minneapolis (CA-36) came alongside to receive 600 rounds of eight-inch projectiles and 1,200 cans of powder. In turn, Tyrrell received all of the cruiser's empty shell casings. The following day, while at anchor in the transport area, Tyrrell's gunners joined in damaging an attacking Japanese bomber.

Upon completion of unloading on 9 April, Tyrrell retired, via Guam and Pearl Harbor, to the West Coast, arriving at San Francisco on 11 May. She then made two runs to Pearl Harbor carrying cargo. On 27 July, the cargo ship got underway for the Marshall Islands.

While en route to Majuro, she received orders on 4 August diverting her to Roi, where she arrived on 9 August. Four days later, while she unloaded cargo at Majuro, word was received that Japan had surrendered.

=== Post-war activities, 1945–1946 ===
Tyrrell next steamed, via Kwajalein, to Saipan where she embarked men and material of the 2nd Marine Division destined for the occupation of Japan. On the morning of 23 September 1945, Tyrrell arrived off the devastated Japanese port city of Nagasaki and began disembarking her troops and equipment. The attack cargo ship next proceeded to the Philippines, arriving at Manila on 27 September. She then shuttled between the Philippines and Japan, supporting occupation activities by transporting supplies to such ports as Wakayama and Nagoya. On 13 November 1945, Tyrrell departed Nagoya, bound for Seattle, Washington.

After voyage repairs at the Puget Sound Naval Shipyard, she returned to Japan, this time to deliver supplies for the American occupation forces at Kure, arriving there on 10 January 1946. Departing Japanese waters on 2 February, she proceeded through the Panama Canal to the East Coast.

=== Decommissioning and fate ===
Upon her arrival at Norfolk on 4 March 1946, Tyrrell reported to the Commandant, 5th Naval District, for disposition. She was decommissioned at Norfolk on 19 April, returned to the War Shipping Administration on 22 April, and struck from the Navy List on 1 May 1946.

Purchased in 1948 by the Pacific Far East Line of Delaware, and homeported in San Francisco, the ship was renamed SS California Bear and served as a freight carrier through 1961, when she was again renamed — this time SS America Bear (Pacific Far East had another ex-AKA in their fleet as America Bear from 1966 to 1969. That ship was the former USS Vinton). She was sold in 1963 to the Central Gulf Steamship Corp.; homeported in New Orleans, Louisiana; and renamed SS Green Lake. After plying the waters of the Caribbean under this name from 1963 to 1968, she was taken over by the United States Department of Commerce and named SS Oceanic Cloud. She was sold for scrapping on 13 October 1967 to Kuang I. Enterprises Co., China.

== Awards ==
Tyrrell received one battle star for her service in World War II.
