= Gulf & South American Steamship Company =

Defunct shipping company

- The company's house flag
- Industry: Shipping
- Founded: 1947
- Fate: Absorbed into Lykes Line, 1971

The Gulf & South American Steamship Company was a shipping company jointly owned by Grace Line and Lykes Line. Established in 1947, the company was intended to operate between the Gulf Coast of the United States and South America to prevent competition between its parent organizations. The company initially operated five freighters, each of which was replaced in the mid-1960s. After Grace Line was dissolved, the company was absorbed by Lykes Line in 1971.

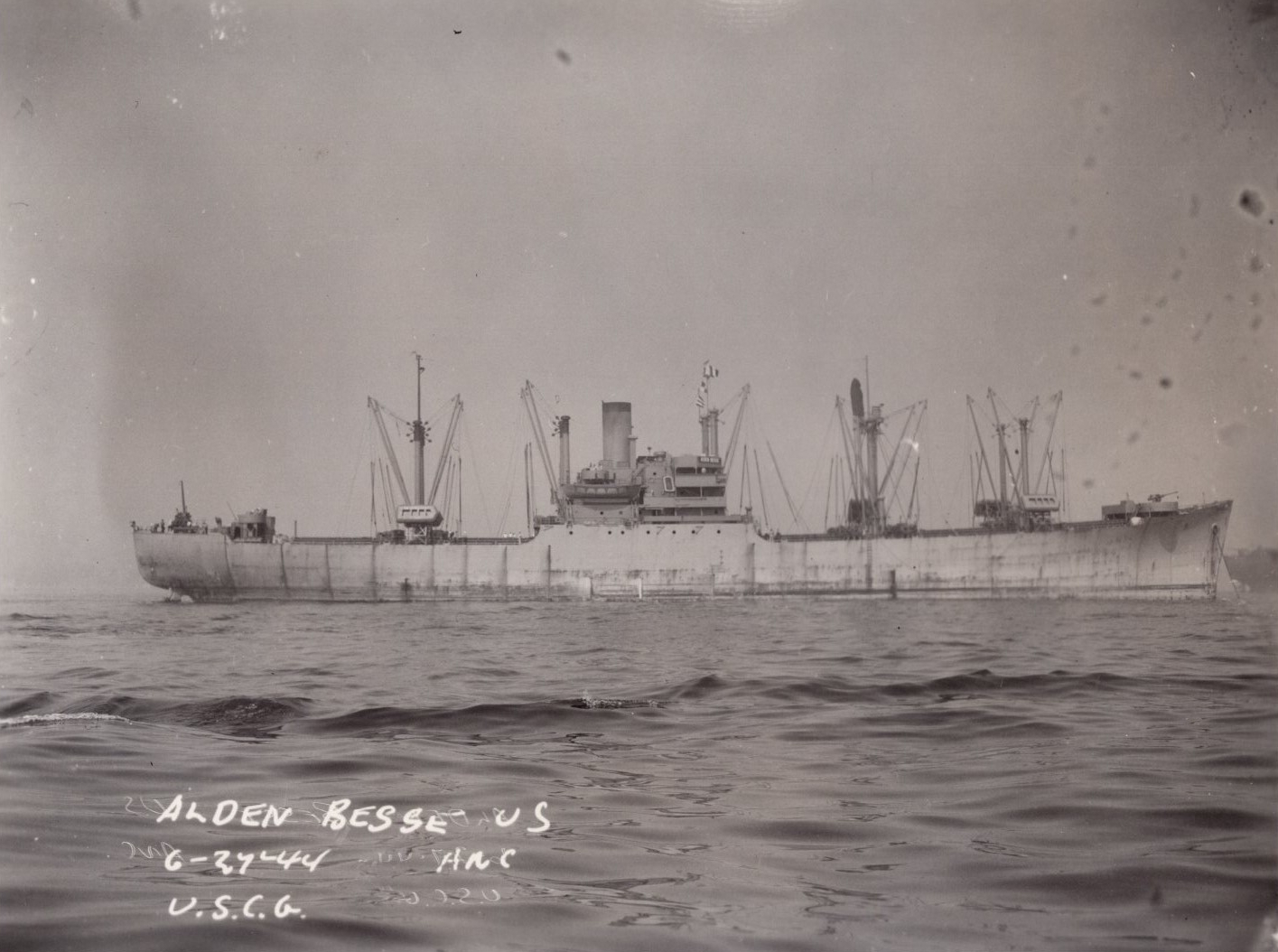
The first Gulf Banker (above) and second Gulf Banker (below)

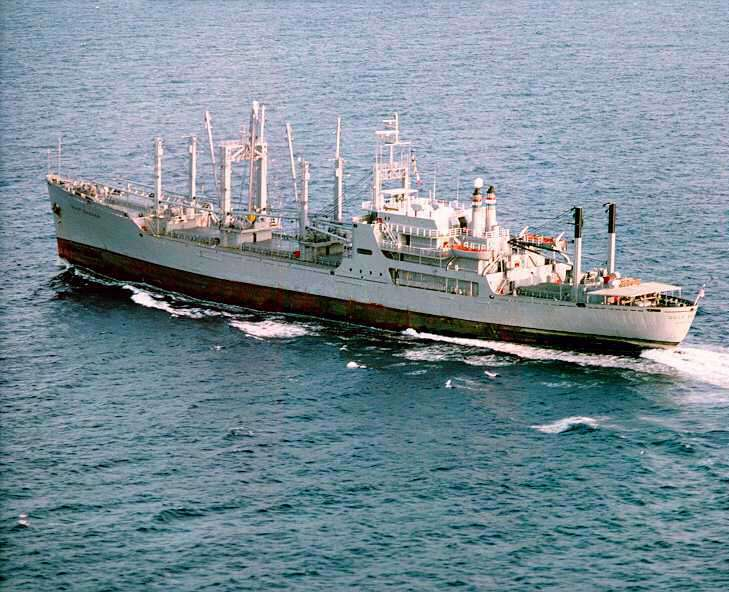

== History ==
In the late 1940s, Grace Line operated along the East Coast of the United States and the West Coast of South America, while Lykes Line operated in the Gulf Coast of the United States. Both companies were interested in creating a service between the Gulf Coast and South America; instead of competing, the two companies formed the Gulf & South American Steamship Company under joint ownership. In 1947, the company was established and given five C-2 ships that were built during World War II. Each vessel's name included the prefix "Gulf".

In the early 1960s, Lykes Line underwent a major shipbuilding effort to modernize its entire fleet. Gulf & South American Steamship was slated to receive five Gulf Pride-class cargo liners, although the design was slightly modified to produce the five Gulf Andes-class freighters. Once delivered in 1964 and 1965, the modern ships replaced the older C-2 vessels one-to-one, and assumed the name of the ship that was replaced.

In 1969, Grace Line was dissolved by its parent company and folded into Prudential Lines. Two years later, Lykes Line bought out Grace's share and assumed full ownership of the company and each ship. While service was initially maintained, the company's ships were indistinguishable from other Lykes freighters. As a result, the vessels were absorbed into the Lykes' fleet and used around the world. The company then ceased to exist and was absorbed into Lykes in 1971.

== Ships in fleet ==
Data
Name	Year launched	Tonnage
Gulf Farmer (I)	1943	8,258
Gulf Trader (I)	1943	6,134
Gulf Banker (I)	1944	8,258
Gulf Merchant (I)	1944	8,159
Gulf Shipper (I)	1945	8,,189
Gulf Banker (II)	1964	9,459
Gulf Farmer (II)	1964	9,459
Gulf Shipper (II)	1964	9,475
Gulf Trader (II)	1964	9,475
Gulf Merchant (II)	1965	9,475
