= Paul Curtis (shipbuilder) =

American shipbuilder

- Born: December 26, 1800; Scituate, Massachusetts
- Died: January 10, 1873 (aged 72)
- Occupation: Shipbuilder
- Parent(s): Elijah Curtis & Rachel Clapp

Paul Curtis (December 26, 1800 – January 10, 1873) was an American shipbuilder who built ships in Medford, Massachusetts (up the Mystic River from Boston).

== Background ==
Shipbuilding was one of the two big businesses at Medford in the mid-19th century. Thatcher Magoun's shipyard, where Curtis did his apprenticeship, was the oldest (established 1802) and largest of the 10 yards, and remained so even after Thatcher's retirement in 1836. In 1845 one-quarter of all shipwrights in Massachusetts were employed in the Medford shipyards. The yards clustered along 1 mile of the Mystic River riverfront, and Curtis's yard was between South, Winthrop and Curtis Streets. He launched his ships directly across the South Street roadway. The yards drew upon the ready supply of local timber until the local woods were depleted. Ships were then built from timber cut down and floated south from the hardwood forests of New Hampshire. Each ship was built from fifteen or more species of wood carefully pieced together where the special properties of each would do the most good.

Curtis was the youngest child of Elijah and Rachel (Clapp) Curtis. He was born on December 26, 1800, in Scituate, Massachusetts. In 1819, at the age of 18, he moved to Medford and began an apprenticeship as a shipwright in Medford at the shipyard of Mr. Thatcher Magoun. When serving time as apprentice he was called "Honest Paul". In 1834 the firm of Curtis and Co. was formed together with James O. Curtis. In the 5 years from 1834 to 1839 they were to build 9 vessels. In 1836 they took over the yard of Thatcher Magoun to whom they had both been apprenticed, relinquishing the yard to others after their partnership dissolved in 1839. Carrying on business on his own, Paul Curtis built another 27 vessels at Medford before moving his shipbuilding business to East Boston in 1852. He continued to build boats at East Boston until his retirement from shipbuilding. James Curtis also continued building ships on his own at Medford. Even though both Paul and the younger James shared a surname, and were both born in Scituate, they were not closely related and no link has been found between their families.

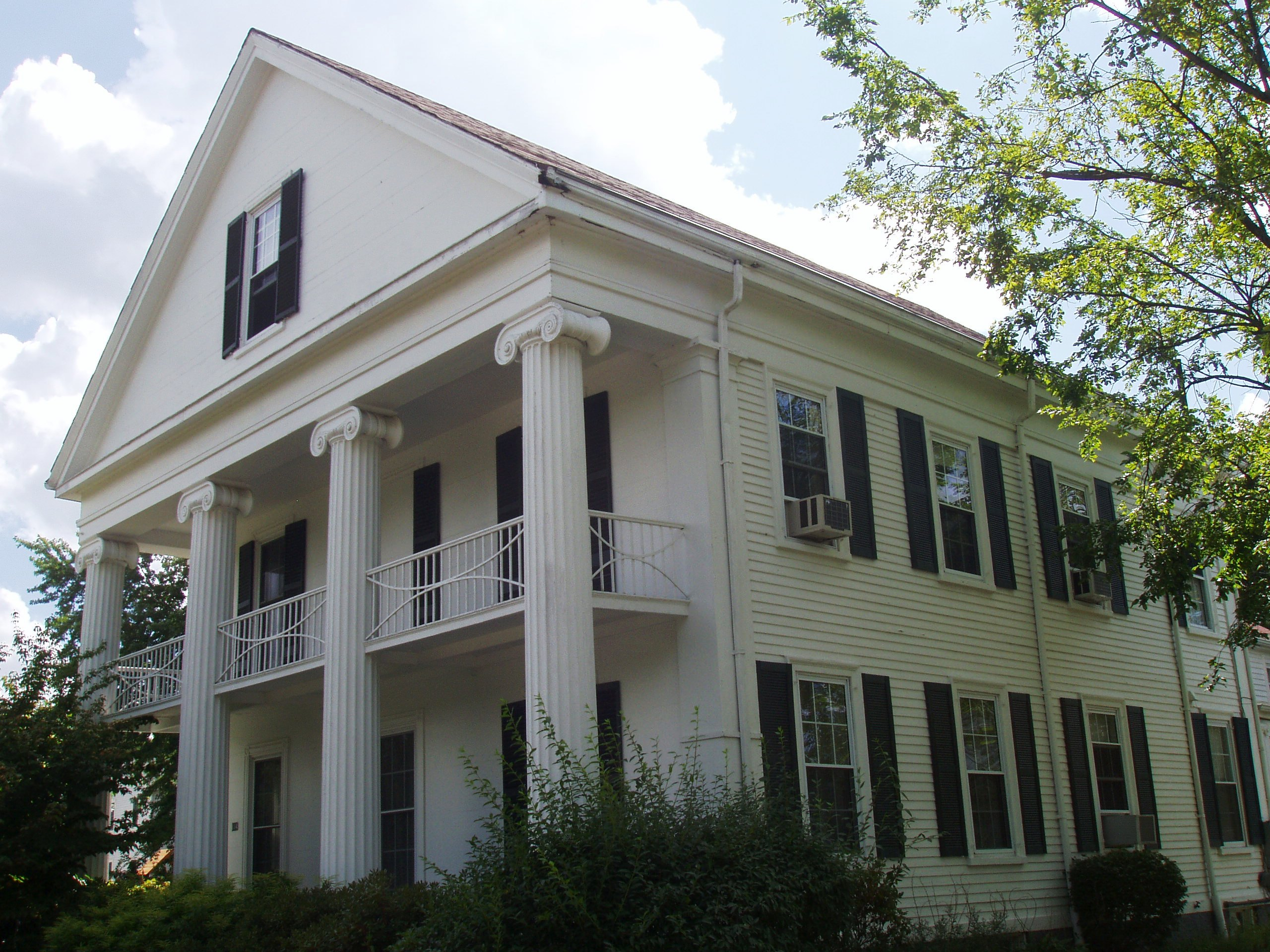
Paul Curtis House

While living at Medford he built and occupied the large house with pillars on South Street now known as Grandfather's House. Curtis Street at Medford is named in remembrance of this ship builder. Also in 1845 Curtis had upon the stocks at his shipyard near the Winthrop-street bridge a ship of 850 tons burden, it being the largest vessel built in Medford up to that date. This ship was too wide to pass through the draw of the bridge, and the town was again petitioned to widen the draw, and chose a committee to repair according to their discretion; under this vote the bridge was rebuilt, the width of the draw increased to 40 feet, and the north abutment relaid.

Curtis built ships at Medford, and later, after 1852, at East Boston, except for the occasional ship that he built elsewhere like the extreme clipper Witchcraft that he built at Chelsea, Massachusetts in 1850 with Mr. Taylor, and the Golden Fleece that he built in Boston in 1852. Also after 1852 he still occasionally built a ship in the shipyards at Medford.

To illustrate the quality of his work a lady related this experience: She was returning from Europe with husband and family on the ship John Elliot Thayer. They encountered an unusually severe gale lasting three days, with constantly increasing violence. The passengers became so alarmed that the captain was appealed to for assurances of safety. While he admitted the storm to be the worst he had ever known, he called the ladies to the cabin and asked them to notice the builder's name in golden letters on the white enamelled panel. They read this: ‘Paul Curtis, builder.’ He assured them that no ship of Curtis's had ever foundered,—no ships had so high a record for low insurance rates,—no timber or bolt was introduced unless free from all defect. ‘I assure you, ladies,’ he said, ‘I think she will ride this terrible storm safely.’ The ship came safely through the storm.

Curtis died at his residence in East Boston on January 10, 1873.

== Ships ==
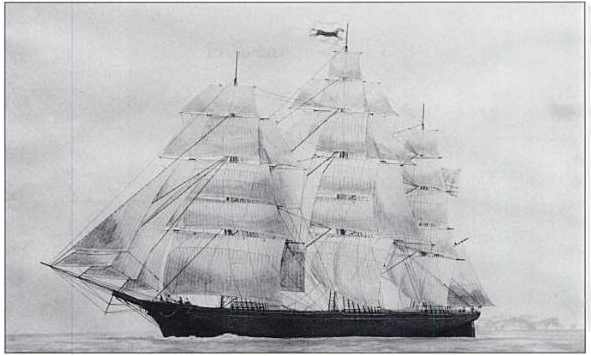
Reporter clipper ship

Included in the vessels built by Curtis were at least 19 American clipper ships:

- 1850 Witchcraft, 1310 tons Old Measurement (extreme clipper) - Chelsea (built together with Taylor)
- 1850 Kremlin, 504 tone Old Measurement (extreme clipper barque)
- 1851 Courser, 1024 tons Old Measurement (medium clipper) - Medford
- 1851 Samuel Lawrence, 1040 tone Old Measurement (medium clipper) - Medford
- 1852 Beverly, 676 tons Old Measurement (medium clipper) - Medford
- 1852 Queen Of The Seas, 1356 tons Old Measurement (extreme clipper) - Medford
- 1852 Golden Fleece, 968 tons Old Measurement (medium clipper) - Boston
- 1852 Golden West, 1441 tons Old Measurement (extreme clipper) - East Boston
- 1852 Radiant, 1318 tons Old Measurement (extreme clipper) - East Boston
- 1852 Cleopatra, 1562 tons Old Measurement (extreme clipper) - East Boston
- 1853 Reporter, 1474 tons Old Measurement (extreme clipper) - East Boston
- 1854 Panther, 1278 tons Old Measurement (medium clipper) - Medford
- 1854 John E(lliot) Thayer, 1918 tons Old Measurement (medium clipper) - East Boston
- 1855 Golden Fleece, 1535 tons Old Measurement (medium clipper) - East Boston
- 1856 Empress, 1293 tons Old Measurement (medium clipper) - East Boston
- 1856 Mary Bangs, 958 tons Old Measurement (medium clipper) - East Boston
- 1856 Fortuna, 659 tons Old Measurement (medium clipper) - East Boston
- 1856 Orion, 1300 tons Old Measurement (medium clipper) - East Boston
- 1857 Belvidere, 1322 tons Old Measurement (medium clipper) - East Boston

== See also ==
- Grandfather's House
