= Golden West (clipper) =

1852 extreme clipper ship

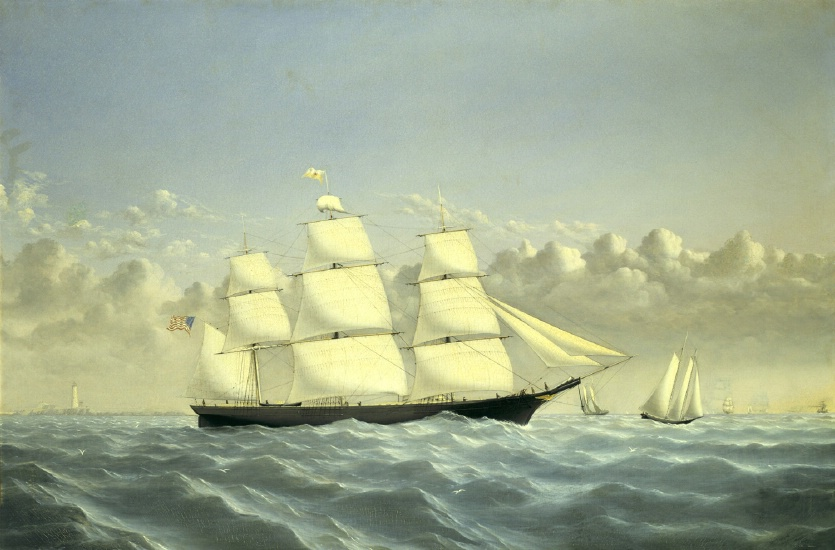
- Golden West, Outward Bound 1852 off Boston Light, by William Bradford

History

United States
- Name: Golden West
- Owner: Glidden & Williams, Boston
- Builder: Paul Curtis, Boston
- Launched: November 16, 1852
- Owner: J.A. & T. A. Patterson, New York City

United Kingdom
- Owner: J.G. Ross
- Builder: Paul Curtis, East Boston
- Cost: $25,000
- Acquired: 1863
- Notes: Designed by Samuel Hall

General characteristics
- Class & type: Extreme clipper
- Tons burthen: 1441 tons
- Length: 210 ft (64 m) LOA
- Beam: 39 ft (12 m)
- Draft: 23 ft 4 in (7.11 m)
- Notes: 2 decks

Golden West was an 1852 extreme clipper built by Paul Curtis. The ship had a very active career in the California trade, the guano trade, the coolie trade, the Far East, and Australia. She made a record passage between Japan and San Francisco in 1856.

== Construction ==
Golden West had a long and sharp bow, with a gilded figurehead of an eagle.

== Voyages ==
Golden West sailed under many different captains, making trips between New York, San Francisco, the Far East, Liverpool and Australia. An outline of her voyages is as follows:

Boston to San Francisco, Captain Samuel R. Curwen, 124 days, 1852.

San Francisco to the Chincha Islands, for a load of guano; arrived at Hampton Roads, January 20, 1854; 69 days from Callao.

Philadelphia to San Francisco, 145 days, 1854 Sailed with Golden State, which had left 4 days earlier, from the Horn to the equator.

San Francisco to Manila, 55 days Manila to New York, 99 days, 1855 Struck a reef in Gaspar Strait; jettisoned 200 tons of hemp to get off it.

New York to San Francisco, Capt. Putnam, 175 days. Sustained damage to rig off Cape Horn; spent 26 days in Valparaíso for repairs, 111 days out. Val paraísoto San Francisco, 39 days—very fast run.

San Francisco to Hong Kong via Honolulu, 56 days.

Hong Kong to San Francisco, Capt. Folger, 47 days, 1856

Japan to Farallon Islands (off San Francisco), 4876 mi., 20 days. This was the record passage to date.

San Francisco to Hong Kong, Capt. Putnam, 62 days Bangkok to Shanghai, with a cargo of rice, 1857 Shanghai to New York, 103 days, 79 days from Anyer, 1857

New York to Sydney, Capt. Curwen, Feb. 25-Aug. 8, 1858 Sydney to Hong Kong, 40 days, a fast time. Hong Kong to San Francisco, 60 days San Francisco to New York, Capt. Pinkham, 126 days, 1859 New York to London, Capt. McKenzie London to Melbourne, 100 days

Trade in the Far East, under Capt. Lunt, until 1862 Shanghai to New York, Capt. Crandall, 101 days, 1863 New York to Liverpool, 1863

== Sale of the ship ==
Golden West was sold at auction to British buyers in 1863. As of 1864, she was listed with a home port of Liverpool, owner J.G. Ross, Captain Jewett, master.

== Coolie trade ==
In 1866 Golden West was in the coolie trade between China and Peru.
