= USS Vinton =

Cargo ship of the United States Navy

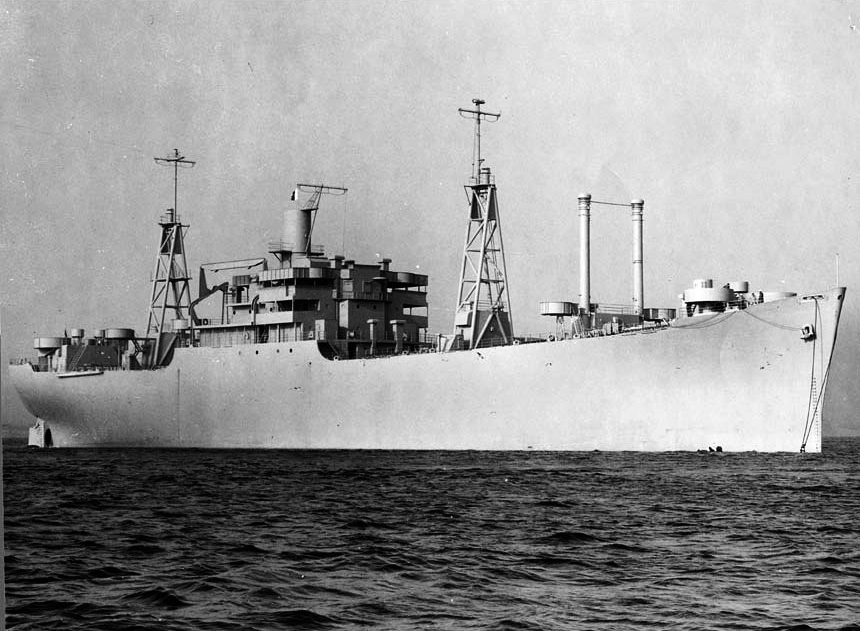
- Vinton in September 1944

History

United States
- Name: USS Vinton
- Namesake: Vinton County, Ohio
- Builder: North Carolina Shipbuilding Company, Wilmington, North Carolina
- Laid down: 20 June 1944
- Launched: 25 August 1944
- Commissioned: 23 February 1945
- Decommissioned: 16 March 1946
- Renamed: SS Gulf Shipper; SS President Harding; SS America Bear; SS Columbia Beaver
- Stricken: 5 June 1946
- Fate: Sold into merchant service, 1947; Scrapped 22 November 1971

General characteristics
- Class & type: Tolland-class attack cargo ship
- Displacement: 13,910 long tons (14,133 t) full
- Length: 459 ft 2 in (139.95 m)
- Beam: 63 ft (19 m)
- Draft: 26 ft 4 in (8.03 m)
- Speed: 16.5 knots (30.6 km/h; 19.0 mph)
- Complement: 425
- Armament: 1 × 5"/38 caliber gun; 4 × twin 40 mm guns; 16 × 20 mm guns

USS Vinton was a Tolland-class attack cargo ship in service with the United States Navy from 1945 to 1946. She was sold into commercial service and was scrapped in 1971.

== History ==
Vinton was named after Vinton County, Ohio. She was laid down as a Type C2-S-AJ3 ship under a United States Maritime Commission contract (MC hull 1393) on 20 June 1944 at Wilmington, North Carolina, by the North Carolina Shipbuilding Company; launched on 25 August 1944; sponsored by Mrs. J. W. Kirkpatrick; acquired by the Navy under a loan-charter basis on 7 September 1944; converted to an attack cargo ship configuration at Baltimore, Maryland, by the Bethlehem Steel Company's Key Highway plant; and commissioned on 23 February 1945.

=== World War II, 1945 ===
Following shakedown training in Chesapeake Bay, Vinton sailed via the Panama Canal zone for the Central Pacific and arrived at Pearl Harbor on 16 April. She conducted training exercises in the Hawaiian operating area for a month and one-half before she weighed anchor on 30 May and got underway for the Marianas. Two days out, the attack cargo ship was called upon to perform an errand of mercy when an ailing seaman from the submarine Silversides (SS-236) was transferred via Gato (SS-212) to Vinton for an emergency appendectomy. By the time the attack cargo ship arrived at Guam on 13 June, the submariner had recovered sufficiently to rejoin his ship.

Vinton remained at Guam until 25 June, when she headed for the Western Carolines. She arrived at Ulithi the next day, pushed on for the Ryukyus on 9 July, dropped anchor off Okinawa on the 13th and began unloading her cargo. Despite frequent kamikaze alerts and a typhoon evasion maneuver, her crew bent to the task of making inroads into the mountains of cargo in her holds. Returning to Ulithi on the 28th, Vinton departed the Western Carolines on the 30th and arrived at Pearl Harbor on 6 August. Slightly over a week later, the war was over. Japan – under the staggering weight of two atomic bombs and American armadas which ranged off her shores virtually unchallenged and unchecked – surrendered unconditionally by 15 August.

=== Post-war activities, 1945–1946 ===
On 22 September, Vinton commenced her post-war operations supporting the fleet and its bases with cargo lifts to Tinian; Guam; Subic Bay, Philippine Islands; Manus, in the Admiralties; Batavia, Java; and Biak, New Guinea, before she returned to Manus en route home. Departing the Admiralty Islands on 17 January 1946, the attack cargo ship arrived at San Francisco on 5 February. Departing San Francisco Bay on 24 February, bound for the east coast, Vinton steamed via the Panama Canal and arrived at New York on 15 March.

=== Decommissioning and fate ===
Vinton was decommissioned on 16 March 1946 for return to the War Shipping Administration the following day and laid up in the James River Group of the reserve fleet at Lee Hall, Virginia. She was struck from the Navy List on 5 June 1946.

On 28 November 1946, the ship was withdrawn from reserve and taken to Bethlehem Steel Shipyard in Baltimore, Maryland for conversion to a civilian configuration. She was initially sold 20 November 1947 to Lykes Brothers Steamship Co, but was resold the next day to the Gulf and South American Steamship Company on 23 September 1964 and entered mercantile service as SS Gulf Shipper. American President Lines, Inc., purchased the erstwhile attack cargo ship and renamed her SS President Harding on 23 September 1964. Subsequently, her ownership changed again on 29 September 1966, when she was purchased by the Pacific Far East Lines and renamed SS America Bear (Pacific Far East had another ex-AKA in their fleet as America Bear from 1961 to 1963. That ship was the former USS Tyrrell). On 10 March 1969, the Columbia Steamship Company purchased the vessel for use in the Pacific freight trade and renamed her SS Columbia Beaver in which livery she served until 22 November 1971 when she was sold for the last time to Long Jong Industries of Taiwan and subsequently scrapped.
