= Gov. Stanford =

Preserved American 4-4-0 locomotive

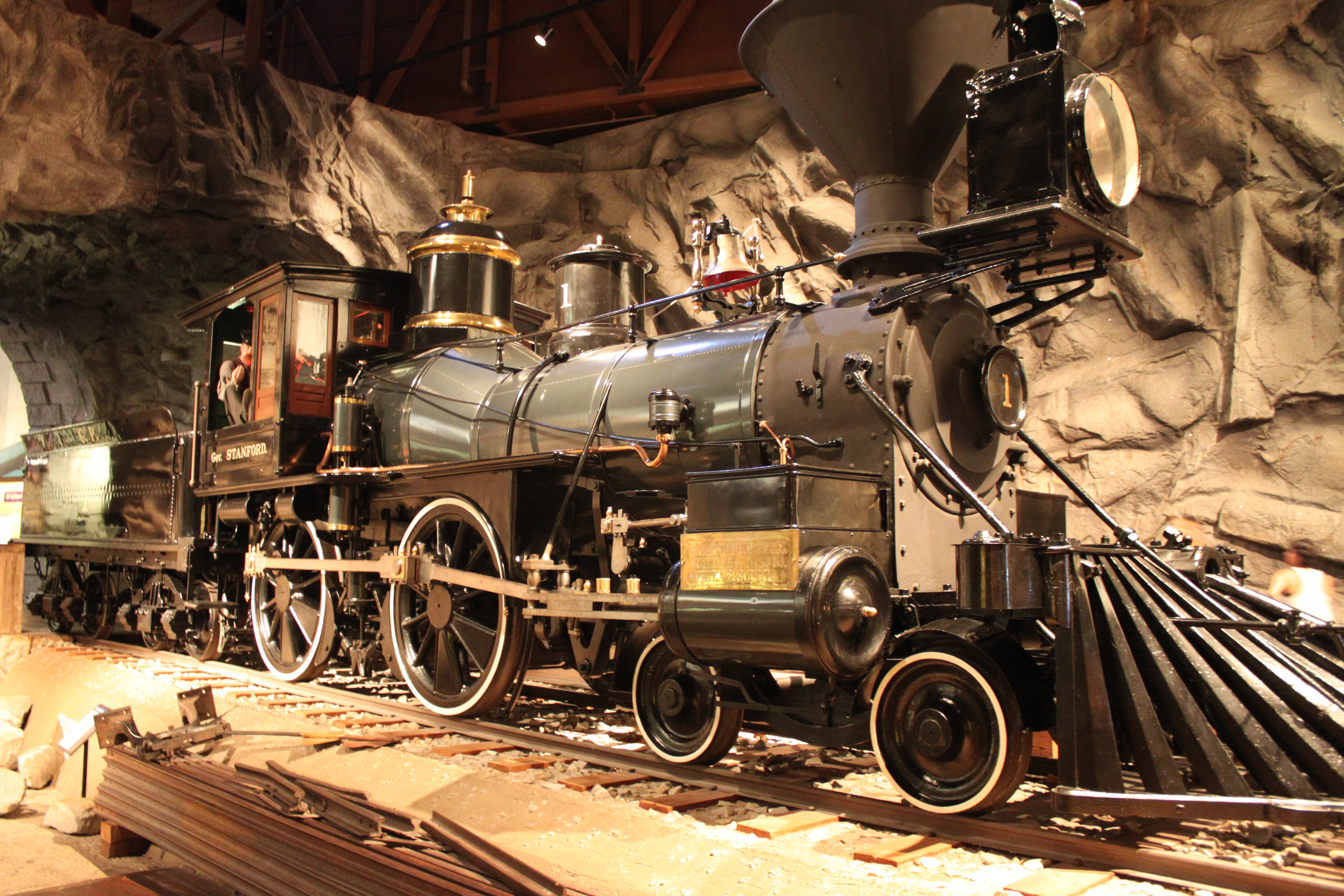
- Gov. Stanford, now at California State Railroad Museum
Type and origin
- Power type: Steam
- Builder: Norris Locomotive Works
- Serial number: 1040
- Build date: 1862
Specifications
- Configuration
  - Whyte: 4-4-0
- Gauge: 5 ft (1,524 mm) (as built); 4 ft 8 1/2 in (1,435 mm) standard gauge (as rebuilt)
- Driver dia.: 54 in (1,372 mm)
- Adhesive weight: 35,700 lb (16,200 kg) rebuilt
- Loco weight: 50,000 lb (23,000 kg), 56,000 lb (25,000 kg) rebuilt
- Fuel type: Wood
- Boiler pressure: 100 psi (690 kPa), 125 psi (860 kPa) rebuilt
- Cylinders: Two, outside
- Cylinder size: 15 in × 22 in (381.0 mm × 558.8 mm) bore × stroke; 16 in × 22 in (406.4 mm × 558.8 mm) bore × stroke rebuilt
Performance figures
- Tractive effort: 7,791 lbf (34,660 N), 11,081 lbf (49,291 N) rebuilt
Career
- Operators: Central Pacific, Southern Pacific
- Numbers: 1, renum. 1174 in 1891
- Official name: Gov. Stanford
- First run: November 9, 1863
- Retired: July 20, 1895
- Current owner: Stanford University, loaned to Pacific Coast chapter R&LHS
- Disposition: On static display

Gov. Stanford is a 4-4-0 "American" type steam locomotive originally built in 1862 by Norris Locomotive Works. Following construction, it was disassembled and hauled by the ship Herald of the Morning around Cape Horn to California, then up the rivers aboard the schooner Artful Dodger, arriving in Sacramento on October 6, 1863. With a dedication ceremony that included artillery discharge, it entered service on November 9, 1863, and it was used in the construction of the First transcontinental railroad in North America by Central Pacific Railroad bearing road number 1. It was Central Pacific's first locomotive and it is named in honor of the road's first president and ex-California governor, Leland Stanford.

In May 1864, the Gov. Stanford was used to pull the first ceremonial passenger train beginning in Sacramento. The locomotive was withdrawn from mainline service in 1873, and was rebuilt in 1878 with larger cylinders and an increased boiler pressure, which increased its tractive effort to 11,081 pounds-force (49,290 N), as well as being outfitted with a water pump for extinguishing lineside fires. In 1891 the locomotive was renumbered to 1174, although both Joslyn (1956) and Diebert & Strapac (1987) both assert that this number was never actually applied to the locomotive. From 1873, the engine operated as a switcher in the road's Sacramento railyard until retired on July 20, 1895, at which time the railroad donated it to Stanford University; however, it was not delivered to the university until 1899.

The locomotive was disassembled and stored during World War II but was returned to display at the university after reassembly by retired Southern Pacific engineer Billy Jones. In the 1960s, the university needed the space occupied by the engine for other uses, so the engine was removed and loaned in 1963 to the Railway & Locomotive Historical Society, which had been in the process of collecting historic locomotives and rolling stock to be displayed in what would ultimately become the California State Railroad Museum in Sacramento. The locomotive is currently a centerpiece at the museum, where it has been cosmetically restored to its 1899 appearance.

== See also ==
- Jupiter (locomotive), Central Pacific's locomotive at the driving of a Golden spike to complete the Transcontinental Railroad in 1869
- List of preserved Southern Pacific Railroad rolling stock
