= Samuel Hartt Pook =

American naval architect

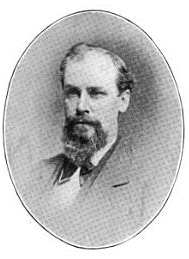
- Born: January 17, 1827; Brooklyn, New York
- Died: March 30, 1901 (aged 74); Washington, D.C.
- Occupation: Naval architect
- Known for: Designer of clipper ships
- Parent: Samuel Moore Pook

Samuel Hartt Pook (January 17, 1827 – March 30, 1901) was a Boston-based American naval architect and son of Samuel Moore Pook (1804-1878), the noted clipper ship naval architect.

== Clipper ships ==
Pook designed several very fast clippers, including the Surprise, Witchcraft, Herald of the Morning and Northern Light, all of which made passages, prior to 1861, from an American East Coast port to San Francisco, via Cape Horn in fewer than 100 days, a speedy passage for the period. He was involved in the design of the 1850 clipper barque Race Horse. Pook also designed the 1853 clipper Challenger and the Red Jacket, a holder of the speed record for the New York City-Liverpool and Liverpool-Melbourne passages.

== Ironclad design for USS Galena ==
Pook was less successful in his design for the Civil War-era ironclad Galena, which was found, in combat conditions, to suffer from ineffective armoring.

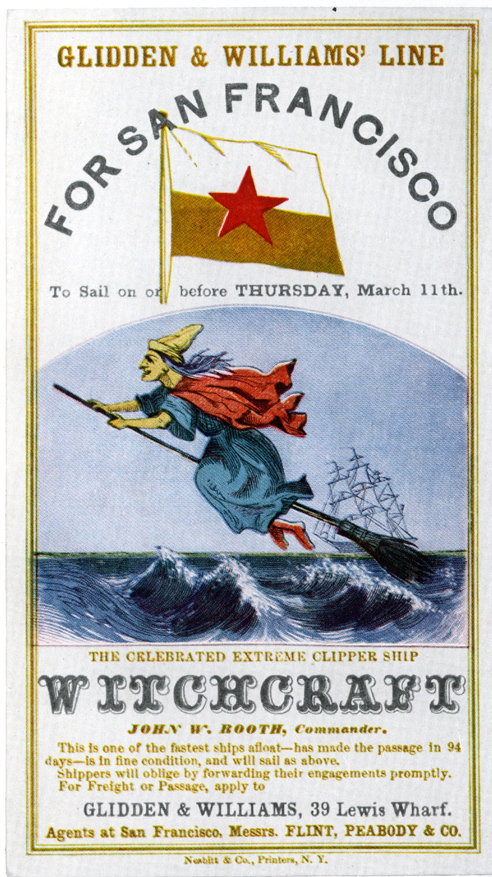

Pook's father was the naval architect Samuel Moore Pook, who designed the far more successful City-class ironclads of the same period.

The Idler was a luxury schooner yacht built in the summer of 1864 by the S. H. Pook in Fair Haven. She was owned by yachtsman Thomas C. Durant and part of the New York Yacht Squadron.
