= Herald of the Morning (clipper) =

History

United States
- Name: Herald of the Morning
- Owner: Thatcher Magoun & Co
- Builder: Hayden & Cudworth, Medford, MA
- Launched: Dec. 1853
- Acquired: 1875, "Sold to James B. Tibbets and Isaac Benham for $25,000"

Norway
- Port of registry: Norway Arendal
- Acquired: 1879
- Notes: Rigged as a bark

United Kingdom
- Owner: W.J. Smith
- Port of registry: United Kingdom
- Acquired: 1890
- Fate: Not listed 1891

General characteristics
- Class & type: Medium clipper ship
- Tons burthen: 1294 tons OM, 1108 tons NM
- Length: 203 ft (62 m)
- Beam: 38 ft (12 m)
- Draft: 23 ft 6 in (7.16 m)
- Armament: "Two fancy brass cannon mounted on her poop deck"

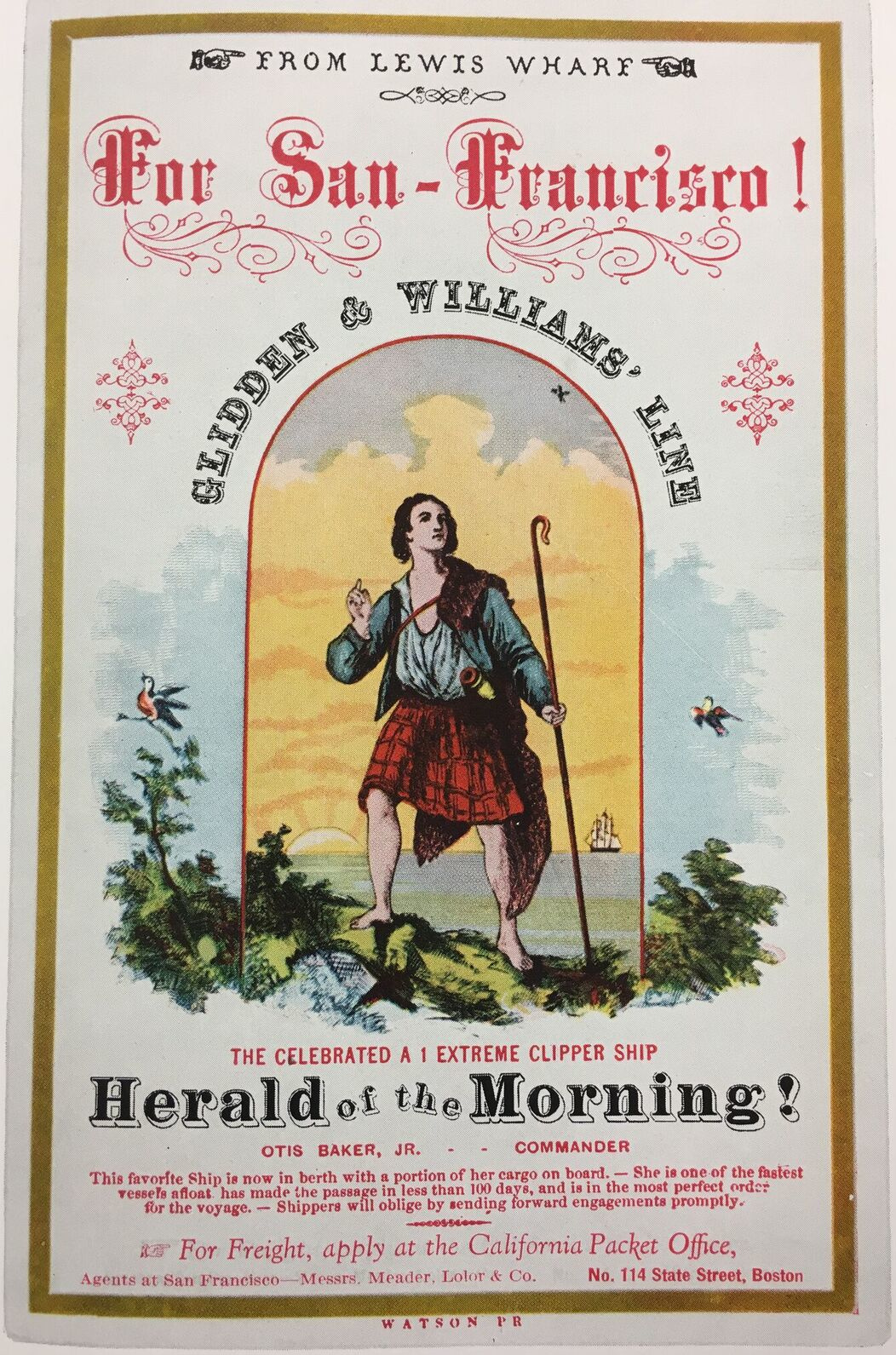
Clipper ship sailing card

Herald of the Morning was one of the few clipper ships with a passage to San Francisco in less than 100 days.

== Construction ==
Herald of the Morning was designed by Samuel Hartt Pook. 'Her lines were sharp, approaching those of an actual clipper, yet she could carry in dead weight close to 1600 tons." The Mauritius Commercial Gazeteer described the bow of Herald of the Morning as "so sharp as to take the form of a razor, the keel forming the edge; there are no rails at the bow, which is quite unencumbered". An 1854 Boston Daily Atlas writer was impressed by the beauty of her accommodations, and described the ship's overall appearance thus: "Her stern is oval in outline, and is finely ornamented with gilded carved work. She is sheathed with yellow metal, and is painted black outside; inside she is white, and the waterways blue, and her rack rail is covered with yellow metal fore and aft."

== Named after ancient goddess ==
The name Herald of the Morning refers to Eos (Greek) or Aurora (Roman) the Goddess of Dawn. Her figurehead was a "full figure of Aurora ... placed to correspond with the inclination of the cutwater."

== Voyages ==
Herald of the Morning had a reputation for speed. She made 18 passages around Cape Horn during the 20 years she was under the U.S. flag, and two homeward trips around the Cape of Good Hope.

Boston to San Francisco, Capt. Baker, 106 days, 1854 (Was within 180 mi. of the Golden Gate 100 days out)

New York to San Francisco, Capt. Lathrop, 130 days, 1857

Boston to San Francisco, Capt. Baker, arriving March 18, 1859, 116 days
Boston to San Francisco, Capt. Mitchell, arriving May 25, 1860, 108 days

== Record California passage in 1855 ==
Herald of the Morning made the fastest passage of the year from New York City to San Francisco, arriving May 16, 1855
100 days, 6 hours, anchor to anchor
99 days, 12 hours, pilot to pilot
Best day's run, 340 mi.

After this passage, she took a load of guano to Mauritius, arriving Dec. 7 1855, under Captain Otis Baker Jr.

== Locomotive transport ==
Herald of the Morning left Boston on May 16, 1863, carrying Central Pacific locomotive No. 1 Gov. Stanford, and arrived in San Francisco on September 20, 1863, after a voyage of 117 days.

== Struck by a sperm whale ==
Herald of the Morning was struck by a very large sperm whale off Cape Horn in 1859. The whale sustained severe injuries. “The ship lost part of her stem, and the pumps had to be kept going until her arrival at destination.”

== Logbook ==
- Logbook of Herald of the Morning, 16 October 1864 - 17 February 1865

== Painting of the ship ==
- Herald of the Morning, by Charles Lundgren
