= Samuel M. Pook =

American naval architect

Samuel Moore Pook
- Born: August 15, 1804; Boston, Massachusetts
- Died: December 2, 1878 (aged 74); Brooklyn, New York
- Occupation: Naval Architect

Samuel Moore Pook (August 15, 1804 – December 2, 1878) was a Boston-based American naval architect and father of Samuel Hartt Pook, the noted clipper ship naval architect. In 1861, at the outbreak of the American Civil War, Pook designed the City class ironclads for James B. Eads. The City class ironclads, also known as "Pook Turtles" due to their distinctive shape, were the backbone of the naval flotilla deployed by the United States Navy on the Mississippi River System during the American Civil War.
