= Thatcher Magoun (clipper) =

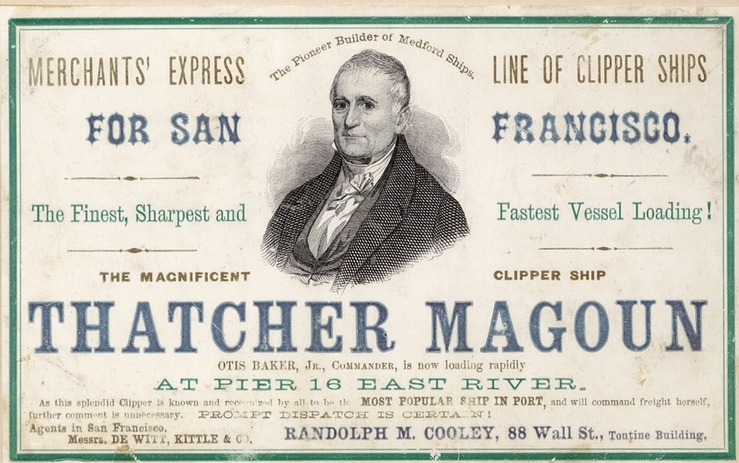
- Thumb

History

United States
- Name: Thatcher Magoun
- Owner: Thatcher Magoun and Sons, Boston
- Builder: Hayden & Cudworth, Medford, MA

Norway
- Renamed: Hercules
- Fate: Reported lost off the coast of Africa in the early 1880s. Listed in 1882 RAFS. Not listed 1884.

General characteristics
- Class & type: Extreme clipper
- Tons burthen: 1248 tons OM, 1155 tons NM
- Length: 200 ft. OA
- Beam: 40 ft.
- Draft: 24 ft.

The Thatcher Magoun was an extreme clipper launched in 1855. She was built in shipyards on the Mystic River at Medford, Massachusetts by shipbuilder Thatcher Magoun. Magoun died the year she was launched, and the ship was named after him.

The ship's figurehead was a lifelike image of Magoun, who was known as "the father of ship building on the Mystic".

The Thatcher Magoun was claimed to sail at a speed of 16 knots.

== Voyages ==
In April 1862, Thatcher Magoun sailed New York to San Francisco and Liverpool, arriving in Boston in April 1863. The ship sailed from Hamburg in November 1865, and arrived in New York in January 1866.

Thatcher Magoun made five passages from Boston to San Francisco. For this route, the clipper's fastest journey was completed in 113 days, and its slowest in 152 days. In 1869, Thatcher Magoun made seven passages from New York to San Francisco, averaging 96 days per voyage.

On one of its voyages from New York to San Francisco, Thatcher Magoun carried locomotives CP 88, 89, and 95 for the Central Pacific Railroad company. This voyage began July 10, 1868, and lasted 117 days.

== Ship model ==
A model of the Thatcher Magoun built in 1937 is on display at the Addison Gallery of American Art.
