= Type P1 ship =

American designation for WWII passenger ships

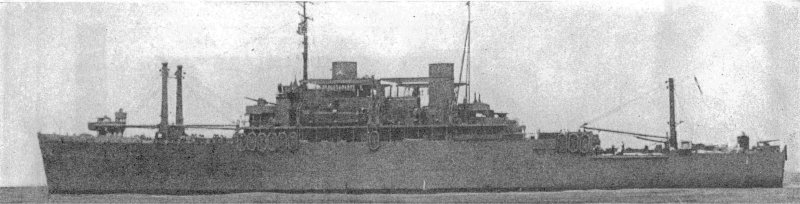
- USS Doyen

Class overview
- Name: Type P1
- Operators: United States
- Planned: 6
- Completed: 6

General characteristics
- Type: Passenger ship
- Displacement: 4,351 tons standard; 6,720 tons full load
- Length: 123.5 m (405 ft 2 in)
- Beam: 17.1 m (56 ft 1 in)
- Draft: 5.64 m (18 ft 6 in)
- Installed power: Westinghouse geared steam turbines, 2 Babcock & Wilcox boilers; 8,000 hp (6,000 kW)
- Propulsion: 2 shafts
- Speed: 9,500 nmi (17,600 km; 10,900 mi) at 15 kn (28 km/h; 17 mph)
- Range: 19 knots (35 km/h; 22 mph)
- Endurance: 1,772 tons fuel oil
- Capacity: 14 × LCVP; 1 × LCPL; 1 × LCPR; 400 t of cargo; 845 marines
- Crew: 472
- Armament: 4 × single 76/50 Mk 20 guns; 2 × 2 - 40/56 Mk 1/2 guns; 10 × 1 - 20/70 Mk 4 guns

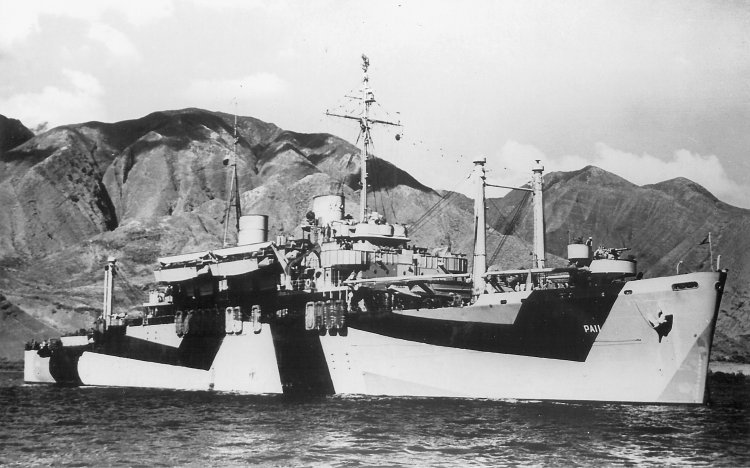
USS Feland

The Type P1 ship is a United States Maritime Administration (MARAD) designation for World War II passenger ships. P1 was used in World War II, Korean War and Vietnam War. Type P1 were the smallest of the P-class ships, at 400 to 500 feet (120 to 150 m) long. Two P1-S2-L2 ships were built for the Navy and used as attack transports (APA). Many P1 type ships were built on Type C3-class ship hulls.

== Ships in class ==
- The P1-S2-L2 Doyen-class attack transports were a series of two ships. The first American assault military transports. Made with an aft ramp for the launching of small landing craft or for the unloading of tanks.
  - USS Doyen, first in class
  - USS Feland
- The P1-S1-DR1 Windsor-class attack transports were four ships constructed in 1948 that were rebuilt as passenger and cargo ships
  - USS Dauphin (APA-97) MC#1675
  - USS Dutchess (APA-98) MC#1676
  - USS Queens (APA-103) MC#1677
  - USS Shelby (APA-105) MC#1678

== See also ==
- Victory ships
- Liberty ship
- Type C1 ship
- Type C2 ship
- Type C3 ship
- United States Merchant Marine Academy
- List of auxiliaries of the United States Navy
