= Doyen (disambiguation) =

A doyen is an expert or the senior member of a group. It may also been used to refer to a senior diplomat, usually the head of the diplomatic corps, in its male or female forms: "doyen" or "doyenne".

Doyen may also refer to:

== Surname ==
=== People ===
- Charles A. Doyen (1859–1918), American Marine Corps officer
- Eugène-Louis Doyen (1859–1916), French surgeon
- Gabriel François Doyen (1726–1806), French painter
- Gustave Doyen (1827–1923), French painter
- Louis Doyen, French inventor of Doypack
- Ross Doyen (1926–2014), American farmer, rancher, and state legislator

== Places ==
- Ouzouer-le-Doyen, village and commune in north central France
- La Ferrière-au-Doyen, village and commune in northwest France

== Other ==
- Doyen (horse), a racehorse
- La Doyenne, a cycle race
- Doyen-class attack transport, active during World War II with the United States Navy
- USS Doyen, various ships of the United States Navy
- Doyen Verlag, an imprint of VDM Publishing
