= George Bradley (Medal of Honor) =

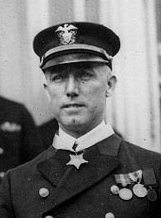
- Chief Gunner's Mate George Bradley, October 4, 1923
- Born: December 5, 1881; New York City, New York
- Died: June 9, 1942 (aged 60)
- Burial place: St. Columba's Cemetery, Middletown, Rhode Island
- Military career
- Allegiance: United States of America
- Branch: United States Navy
- Service years: 1900–1932
- Rank: Lieutenant
- Units: USS Utah (BB-31); USS Montana (ACR-13); USS Doyen (DD-280); USS Zane (DD-337)
- Conflicts: U.S. occupation of Veracruz, Mexico
- Awards: Medal of Honor

George Bradley (December 5, 1881 – June 9, 1942) was a United States Navy officer and a recipient of America's highest military decoration – the Medal of Honor.

== Biography ==
George Bradley was born on December 5, 1881, in New York, New York. He enlisted in the U.S. Navy from Rhode Island in the early 1900s and served as a Chief Gunner's Mate on the USS Utah (BB-31) during the intervention at Veracruz, Mexico in April 1914. When U.S. Naval Forces landed there and came under fire, Bradley led the ammunition party and special details. For his "meritorious service under fire," he was later awarded the Medal of Honor.

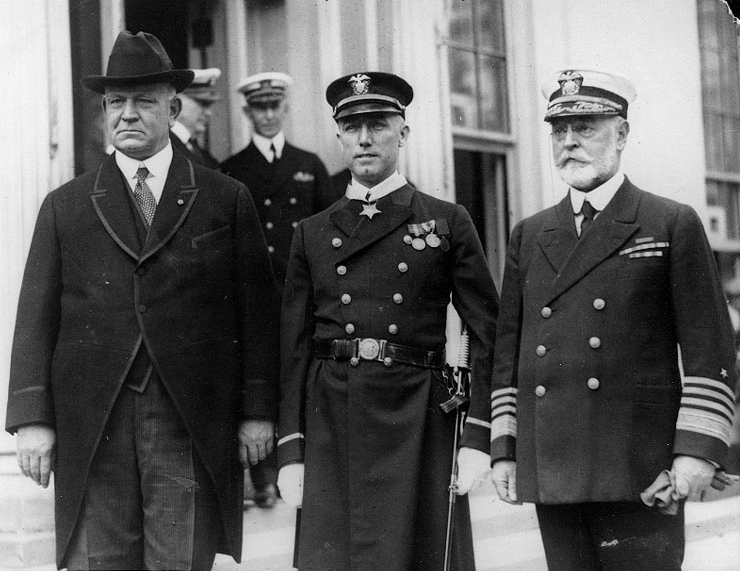
Secretary of the Navy Edwin Denby, Chief Gunner George Bradley, and Admiral Edward W. Eberle, Chief of Naval Operations, at the White House, Washington, D.C., after Bradley had been presented with the Medal of Honor by President Calvin Coolidge.

Bradley was promoted to the warrant officer rank of Gunner in February 1915. During the next two years he served in the armored cruiser USS Montana (ACR-13), which conducted training exercises along the East Coast during the first months of World War I. In the summer of 1917, after reporting to the Naval Torpedo Station, Newport, Rhode Island, Bradley was temporarily promoted to Lieutenant. He reverted to Chief Gunner in August 1920 and was assigned to Destroyer Division 18, part of the Pacific Fleet. In 1922, he transferred to the Washington Navy Yard in Washington, D.C. During his tour of duty there, Bradley was presented with the Medal of Honor by President Calvin Coolidge on October 4, 1923. In February 1928, he reported for sea duty on the destroyer USS Doyen (DD-280) and later served on the USS Zane (DD-337). Upon his retirement in October 1932, Bradley was again promoted to Lieutenant. George Bradley died on June 9, 1942, and is buried at St. Columba's Cemetery, Middletown, Rhode Island.

== Medal of Honor citation ==
Rank and organization: Chief Gunner's Mate, U.S. Navy. Born: S December 1881, New York, N.Y. Accredited to: Rhode Island. G.O. No.: 117, September 13, 1923.

Citation:

For meritorious service under fire on the occasion of the landing of the American naval forces at Vera Cruz in 1914. C.G. Bradley was then attached to the U.S.S. Utah, as a chief gunner's mate, and was in charge of the ammunition party and special details at Vera Cruz. (Medal presented by President Coolidge at the White House on 4 October 1923.)

== See also ==
- List of Medal of Honor recipients (Veracruz)

== Bibliography ==
- "Medal of Honor recipients". United States Army Center of Military History. Archived from the original on 2007-09-15.
- Naval Historical Center (2006-05-30). "US People – Bradley, George". Online Library. Archived from the original on 2006-08-19.
