= USS Doyen =

Two ships of the United States Navy have been named USS Doyen for Charles A. Doyen.

- USS Doyen (DD-280), a Clemson-class destroyer, commissioned in 1919 and decommissioned in 1930.
- USS Doyen (APA-1) (originally AP-2), a transport, commissioned in 1943 and decommissioned in 1946.
