= USS Leedstown (APA-56) =

Windsor-class attack transport

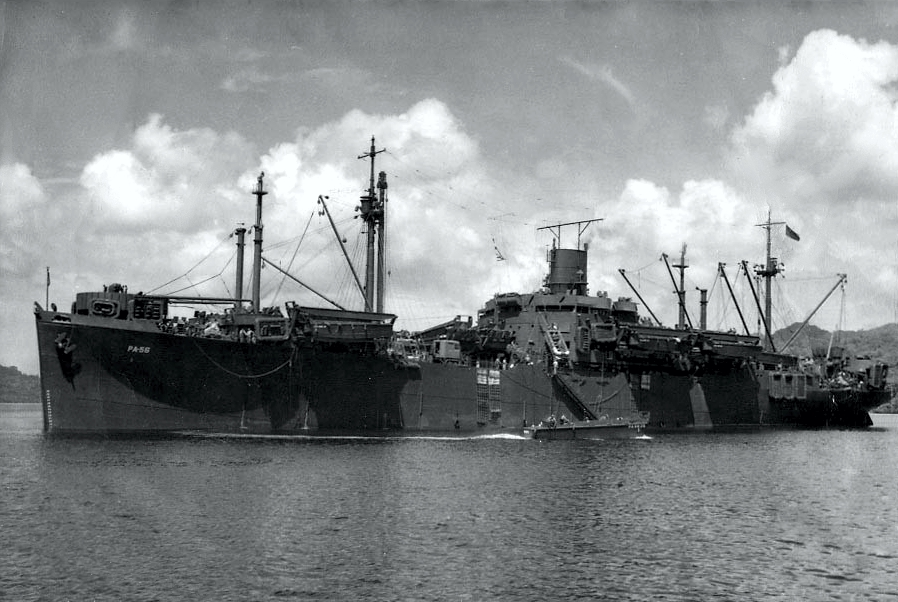
- Leedstown, circa in 1944

History

United States
- Name: USS Leedstown (APA-56)
- Namesake: Leedstown, Virginia, a city in Westmoreland County, Virginia
- Builder: Bethlehem Steel
- Laid down: As Exchequer, 26 August 1942
- Launched: 13 February 1942
- Sponsored by: Mrs. William O. Douglass
- Christened: Exchequer
- Commissioned: 16 July 1943
- Decommissioned: 7 March 1946
- Renamed: USS Wood (AP-101), USS Leedstown (APA-56), Minute Man, Exilona
- Reclassified: AP-101 to APA-56, 1 February 1943
- Honours and awards: Six battle stars for World War II service
- Fate: Scrapped, April 1970

General characteristics
- Class & type: Windsor-class attack transport
- Displacement: 7,950 tons (lt), 13,143 t. (fl)
- Length: 473 ft 1 in
- Beam: 66 ft
- Draft: 25 ft
- Propulsion: Bethlehem geared turbine drive, 2 × Babcock & Wilcox header-type boilers, single propeller, designed shaft horsepower 8,000
- Speed: 18 knots
- Capacity: Troops: 91 officers, 1,496 enlisted; Cargo: 150,000 cu ft, 1,600 tons
- Complement: 91 officers, 522 enlisted
- Armament: 2 x 5"/38 caliber dual-purpose gun mounts; 8 x 1.1"/75 AA guns; 22 x Oerlikon 20mm cannon; Aug 1945: 1 x 5"/38 caliber dual-purpose gun mount; 2 x Bofors 40mm gun mounts; 2 x twin 20mm mounts; 18 x single 20mm mounts.
- Notes: MCV Hull No. 590, hull type C3-S-A1

USS Leedstown (APA-56) was a Windsor-class attack transport that served with the United States Navy from 1943 to 1946. She was subsequently sold into commercial service and was scrapped in 1970.

== History ==
Leedstown was laid down as Exchequer by the Bethlehem Steel Corporation of Baltimore, Maryland on 26 August 1942; classified AP-101 and renamed Wood 5 October 1942; reclassified APA-56 1 February 1943; launched 13 February; renamed Leedstown 17 March 1943; and commissioned 16 July 1943.

=== World War II ===
Leedstown arrived at Norfolk, Virginia 16 July 1943 for amphibious training in Chesapeake Bay with units of the U.S. Army. She departed Norfolk, 11 December for the Pacific, arriving Honolulu New Year's Eve 1943.

==== Invasion of the Marshall Islands ====
The ship sailed from Honolulu 22 January bringing troops to Kwajalein 31 January for the invasion of the Marshall Islands, a major step in the Navy's mighty island hopping campaign which relentlessly pushed Japan back to her home islands and defeat. After the Marshalls were secured, she departed Kwajalein 5 February and spent the next 3 months transporting supplies and reinforcements to the Solomon and Marshall Islands.

==== Invasion of Guam ====
From 10 to 28 May, the ship was at Tulagi, training for the amphibious assault on Guam. Sailing 12 June, she debarked her troops in the resistless assault on Guam, 21 July. Leedstown cared for 270 battle casualties, and departed 5 August for Guadalcanal, returning many of the wounded for hospitalization.

==== Invasion of Peleliu ====
The busy APA rehearsed for the next operation and departed Guadalcanal 8 September for the invasion of Peleliu 15 to 20 September 1944. During this operation, she repaired numerous landing craft and cared for a total of 326 casualties.

==== Invasion of Leyte ====
On 13 October, she sailed from Honolulu as a unit of TF 78, Central Philippine Attack Force, for the attack on Leyte Island, 20 October. On 14 November, she brought reinforcements to this crucial battle zone and then departed for New Guinea 29 November.

Correct "she sailed from Honolulu as a unit of TF 78" To read: "she sailed from Hulmboldt Bay, New Guinea as a unit of TF 78"

Data source: Deck Log, U.S.S. LEEDSTOWN (APA-56) Friday 13 October 1944

Ray D. Kester served aboard Leedstown JULY 1943- JULY 1945 U.S.S. LEEDSTOWN (APA-56) reunion secretary 6128 SHERBORN LN SPRINGFIELD VA 221520–1630 TEL/FAX: 703-451-2520

==== Invasions of Luzon and Iwo Jima ====
She then participated in the landings at Lingayen Gulf, Luzon, 9 January, and Iwo Jima 22 February 1945. Leedstown spent the remainder of the war engaged in training operations and transportation duties in the Pacific.

==== After hostilities ====
After the conclusion of hostilities, she participated in two Operation Magic Carpet missions bringing demobilizing troops home from the war. The first mission traveled from Long Beach to the Philippines, taking a load of soldiers from the Philippines to Japan, then picked up a load of Seabees in Okinawa Japan for transport home to Seattle. The second mission began in Seattle, traveled to Yokohama, Japan, picked up a load of soldiers, then returned to Long Beach. Following the second Magic Carpet mission, the USS Leedstown traveled via the Panama Canal to Norfolk VA where the ship was decommissioned, and later became a cargo ship.

=== Decommission and awards ===
She last entered Seattle in March 1946, decommissioned 7 March and transferred to the Maritime Commission for disposal 1 July 1946. Leedstown was awarded six battle stars for World War II service. The Leedstown (apa56) was the most decorated Winsor Class ship of World War II. It earned its position at the head of the fleet for its last three of its six invasions.

=== Commercial service ===
Leedstown was sold to the Shepard Steam Ship Company in 1947 and renamed Minute Man. Later, she was sold to American Export-Isbrandtsen Lines and renamed Exilona. In February, 1964 the Exilona, captained by Edward L. Jungerheld, delivered the first 6,642-ton installment on the million-ton sale of US grain to the Soviet Union, the first since the conclusion of the Second World War. The ship was scrapped in April 1970.
