= Edward Walter Eberle =

United States Navy admiral (1864–1929)

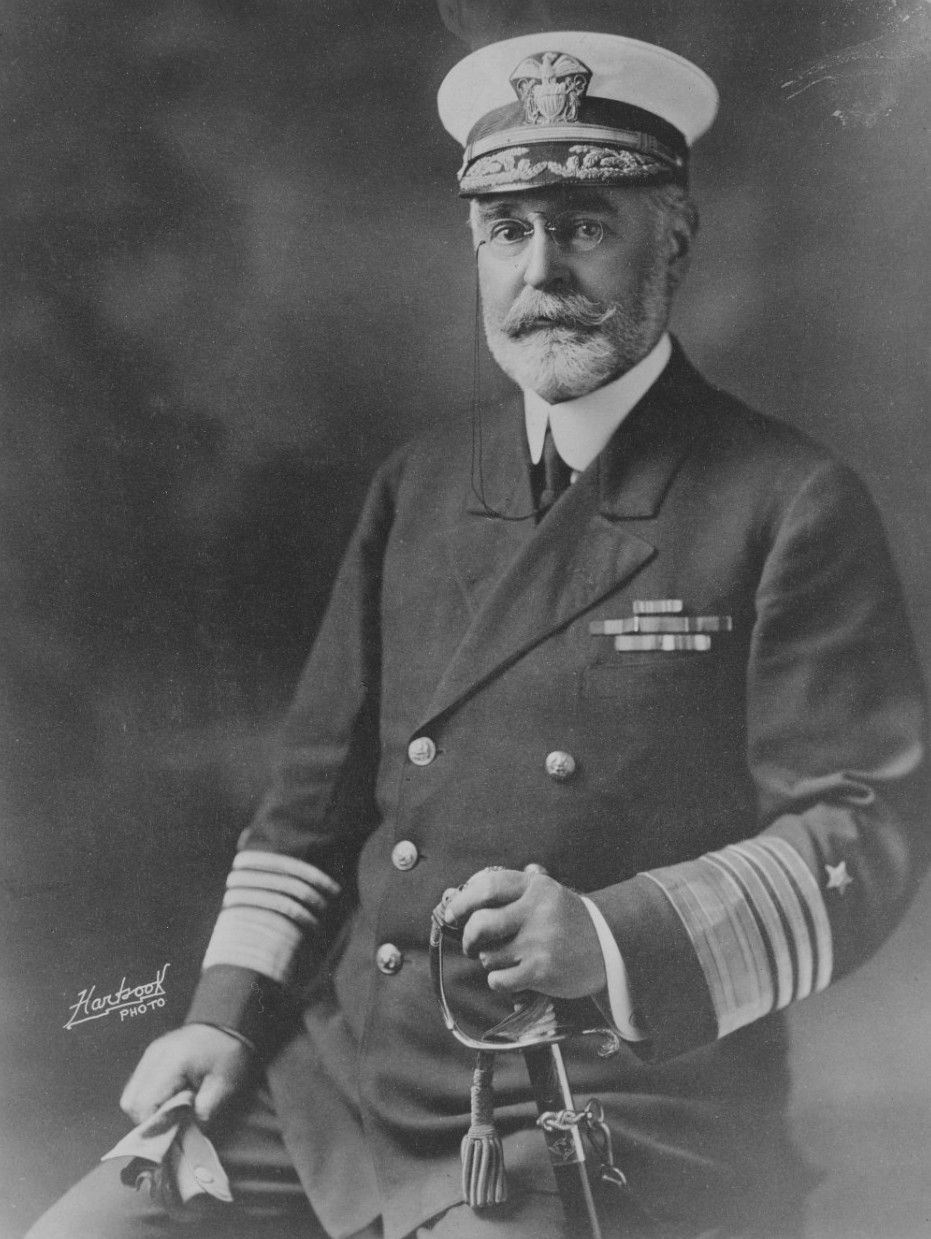
- Born: August 17, 1864; Denton, Texas, US
- Died: July 6, 1929 (aged 64); Washington, D.C., US
- Burial place: Arlington National Cemetery
- Military career
- Branch: United States Navy
- Service years: 1881–1928
- Rank: Admiral
- Commands: Chief of Naval Operations; United States Pacific Fleet; United States Naval Academy; Naval Gun Factory; USS Washington; USS Pensacola
- Conflicts: Spanish–American War; Philippine–American War; World War I
- Awards: Navy Distinguished Service Medal

Edward Walter Eberle (August 17, 1864 – July 6, 1929) was an admiral in the United States Navy, who served as Superintendent of the United States Naval Academy and the third Chief of Naval Operations.

== Early years ==
Edward Walter Eberle was born in Denton, Texas, to Swiss-born immigrant and Confederate Officer [Johann] Joseph Eberle (1828–1877), who originally was from Walenstadt in Sarganserland, and his wife Maria Anna, née Stemmler (1835–1886). He was raised at Fort Smith, Arkansas. He entered the United States Naval Academy on September 28, 1881, and graduated on June 5, 1885.

== Naval career ==
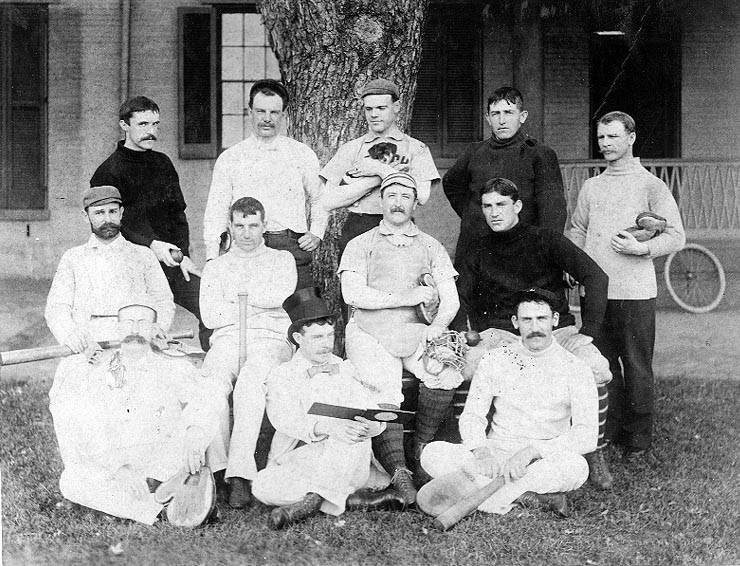
The U.S. Naval Academy, Annapolis, Maryland, Officers' baseball team, summer 1895. Ensign Edward W. Eberle is in the middle row at extreme left.

Following the two years of sea service—spent in screw sloops-of-war USS Mohican and USS Shenandoah and the steamer USS Ranger, as then required before commissioning—Eberle was promoted to ensign on July 1, 1887. Brief duty in Washington, D.C., in the late summer and early autumn preceded his reporting to USS Albatross on November 22, 1887, to begin three years of duty in that U.S. Fish Commission steamer. During his time on the Albatross, commanded by then Captain Z. L. Tanner, he participated in running lines of soundings around Cape Horn, charting the fishing banks off the Pacific Northwest and Alaska, and assisting in developing the Tanner Sounding Device.

Following leave from November 22, 1890, to January 28, 1891, Eberle received instruction in new developments in naval ordnance at the Washington Navy Yard while awaiting orders for sea duty. Here, he demonstrated an interest in and an aptitude for naval gunnery which ever after was central to his career.

On March 20, 1891, Eberle reported to USS Lancaster and, in the veteran screw sloop-of-war, steamed across the Atlantic and Indian Oceans to the Far East. A year and a half later, while still in the Far East, he was transferred to the sailing sloop-of-war Marion to close out this tour of duty in Asiatic waters. He returned to the United States in the summer of 1894 and reported for duty at the Naval Academy on August 20.

In the waning days of this service at Annapolis, Eberle's commission as lieutenant, junior grade, arrived on June 12, 1896, only to be followed a week later by orders sending him across the continent to San Francisco, where the battleship Oregon was being completed at the Union Iron Works. Eberle reported for duty on July 10, five days before the new battleship was first placed in commission. Oregon was one of four U.S. Navy ships of that time mounting modern turrets, and Eberle was assigned duty as the forward turret officer.

=== Spanish–American War and rise to senior command ===
Oregon was still operating along the Pacific coast in the spring of 1898 when Congress declared war on Spain; the ship promptly won great renown by its race south from Puget Sound to Cape Horn and then north to the Caribbean to join American forces blockading Cuba. Eberle distinguished himself during the Battle of Santiago de Cuba by the outstanding performance of his turret in its duel with Spanish cruiser Cristóbal Colón and, later, in its bombardment of Spanish troop concentrations at Caimanera.

From this time on, Eberle reportedly enjoyed the favor of powerful officers in the navy. His promotion to lieutenant came on March 3, 1899, some three months before he was detached from Oregon and transferred to the cruiser Baltimore, in which he served, briefly, as flag lieutenant and acting Chief of Staff of the Commander-in-Chief of the Asiatic Fleet, Captain Albert S. Barker during the Philippine–American War. Later that summer, Eberle returned to Annapolis to become aide to the superintendent of the Naval Academy, Commander Richard Wainwright. Besides carrying out the duties of that position, he busied himself in studying ordnance and in writing manuals for the use of guns and torpedoes and for the operation of wireless communication by warships. The first manual he wrote while there, was Gun and Torpedo Drills for the United States Navy, the Bureau of Navigation's first publication covering drill procedures for modern guns and torpedoes.

Eberle next served as gunnery officer on the battleship Indiana in 1901 and 1902. In September 1902, Eberle became aide to the commandant of the New York Navy Yard, Rear Admiral Barker. In his short time in New York, he was temporarily detailed to serve as aide to British Admiral Lord Charles Beresford during his visits to New York in September and January. In October, he served in like capacity for the Crown Prince of Siam's visit there. In April 1903, Rear Admiral Barker became Commander in Chief of the Atlantic Fleet, and brought Eberle along to again serve as his flag lieutenant. During this two-year assignment, Eberle assisted in installing the first wireless telegraphs on naval vessels, and developed the early procedures and practical uses of the new communication equipment.

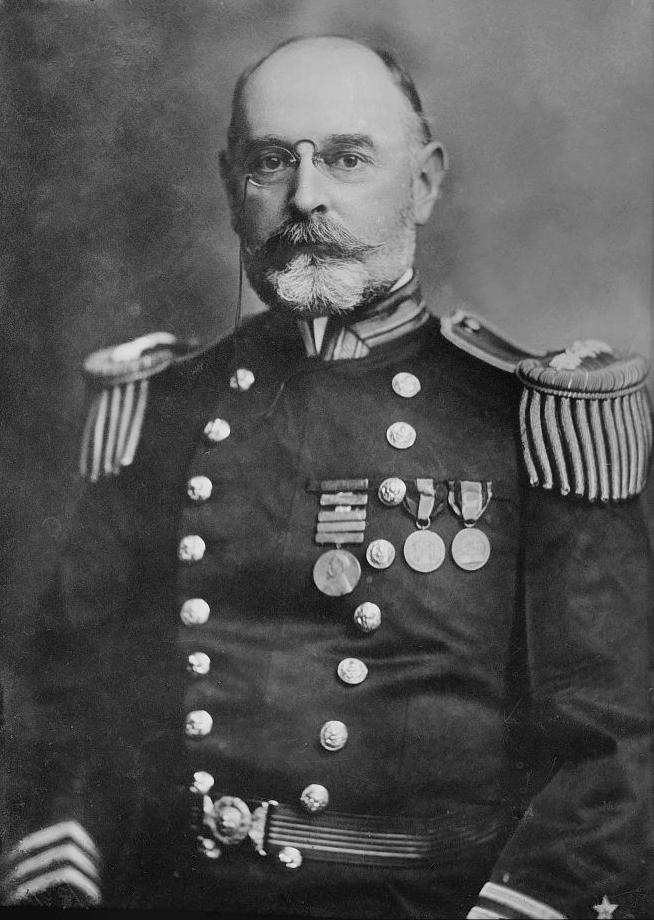
Eberle c. 1915

On November 23, 1904, Eberle received a promotion to lieutenant commander, followed by a short tour as instructor at the Naval War College. In October 1905, he was assigned to the Navy's Board of Inspection and Survey, where he served as recorder. By November 1907, he became executive officer of the battleship USS Louisiana (serving again with Captain Wainwright in command), where he participated in the first leg of the Great White Fleet's voyage around the world. After the fleet arrived in San Francisco, Eberle was detached and assigned to duties as the commanding officer, USS Pensacola. This included the collateral duty as commandant of the San Francisco Naval Training Station. During the latter tour, on December 15, 1908, he was promoted to commander.

Eberle earned a captain's commission on July 1, 1912. He attended the short course at the Naval War College in 1913; command of the cruiser USS Washington and, later, of the Naval Gun Factory at Washington, D.C., preceded Eberle's appointment as Superintendent of the Naval Academy on September 1, 1915.

=== Superintendent to Chief of Naval Operations ===
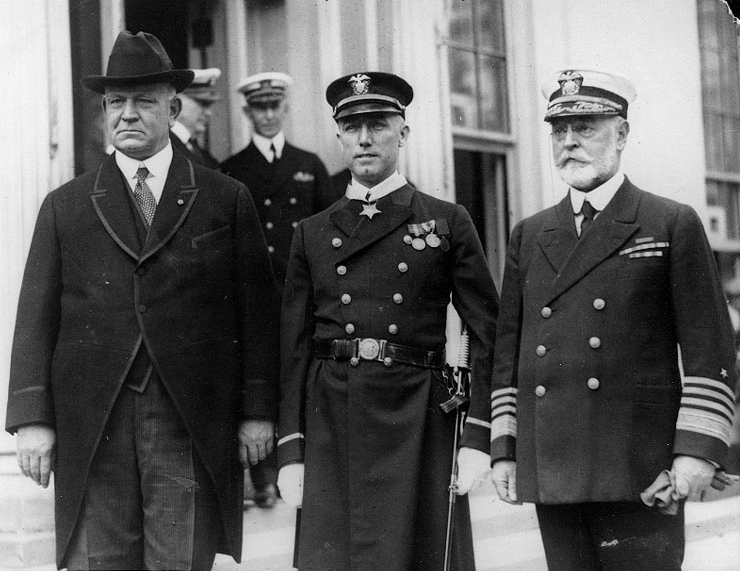
Secretary of the Navy Edwin C. Denby, Chief Gunner George Bradley and Admiral Edward W. Eberle at the White House after Bradley had been presented with the Medal of Honor by President Calvin Coolidge.

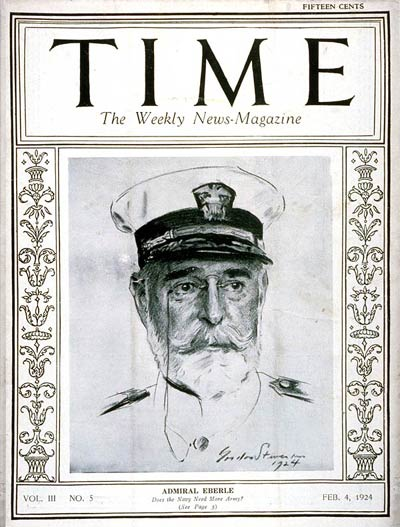
Time Cover, 4 Feb 1924

After overseeing the academy during the period of World War I when the need for officers brought the problems of acceleration, Eberle left Annapolis on January 30, 1919, to command the battleship divisions of the Atlantic Fleet. He was promoted to rear admiral shortly before leaving the academy.

On June 30, 1921, Eberle took command of the Pacific Fleet with the rank of admiral. Some two years later, on July 17, 1923, he became Chief of Naval Operations and held the office until relieved by Admiral Charles F. Hughes on November 14, 1927. During the years he held this post, he reportedly fought to minimize the adverse effect upon the navy of arms limitations negotiations and from Congressional thrift, hurried the completion of the aircraft carriers Lexington and Saratoga, and upheld the navy's right to maintain its own air arm.

After relinquishing the duties of Chief of Naval Operations, Eberle served on the General Board until he retired.

== Retirement ==
Eberle retired from the United States Navy on August 9, 1928, and died in Washington, D.C., on July 6, 1929. He was buried at Arlington National Cemetery, in Arlington, Virginia.

== Marriage and family ==
In 1889, Eberle married Tazie Harrison (1865–1924) of San Francisco, a relative of President William Henry Harrison. They had one son, Edward Randolph Eberle (1890–1935), who also served as a naval officer.

== Awards ==
- Sampson Medal
- Spanish Campaign Medal
- Philippine Campaign Medal
- Victory Medal

== Namesakes ==
The ships, USS Admiral E. W. Eberle (AP-123) and USS Eberle (DD-430), were named in his honor.

== See also ==
- List of superintendents of the United States Naval Academy

Academic offices
Preceded by William F. Fullam	Superintendent of the United States Naval Academy; 1915–1919	Succeeded by Archibald H. Scales
Military offices
Preceded by Robert E. Coontz	Chief of Naval Operations; 1923–1927	Succeeded by Charles F. Hughes
Awards and achievements
Preceded by Herbert B. Swope	Cover of Time magazine February 4, 1924	Succeeded by John Hessin Clarke
