= USS Windsor (APA-55) =

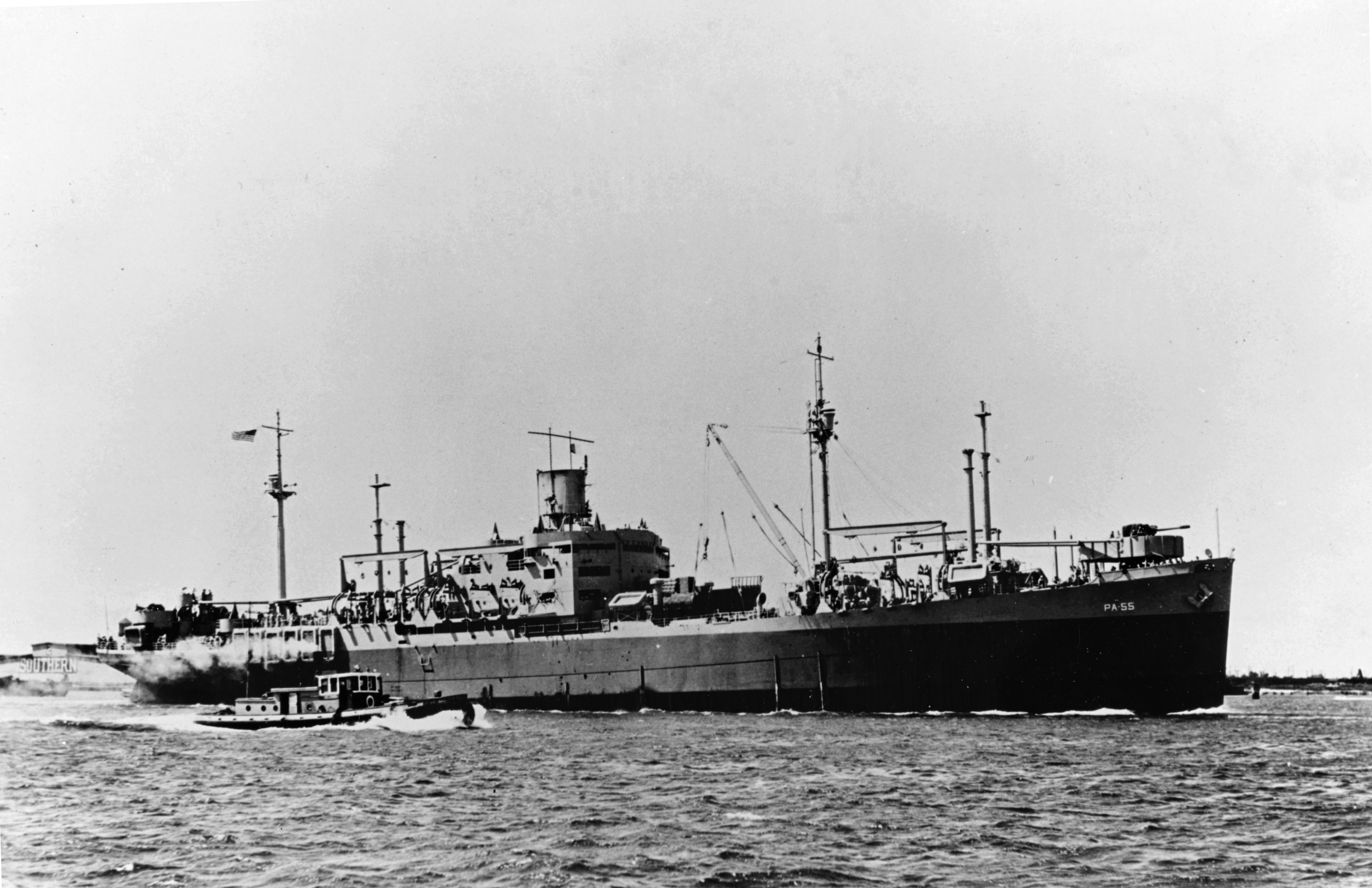
- USS Windsor underway in harbor, c. 1943

History

United States
- Name: USS Windsor (APA-55)
- Namesake: Windsor County, Vermont
- Builder: Bethlehem Sparrow's Point Shipyard
- Laid down: 23 July 1942
- Launched: 28 December 1942
- Sponsored by: Miss Patricia Moreell
- Commissioned: 17 June 1943 as APA-55
- Decommissioned: 4 March 1946
- Reclassified: APA-55 on 16 June 1943
- Stricken: 12 April 1946
- Honors and awards: 5 battle stars
- Fate: Scrapped in Taiwan in 1972

General characteristics
- Class & type: Windsor class attack transport
- Displacement: 13,143 tons
- Length: 473 ft 1 in (144.20 m)
- Beam: 66 ft (20 m)
- Draft: 25 ft (7.6 m)
- Propulsion: two boilers, one geared turbine drive, single shaft, 8,000 hp (6,000 kW)
- Speed: 18.6 knots (21.4 mph; 34.4 km/h)
- Troops: 1,511
- Complement: 552
- Armament: 2 × 5"/38 caliber gun mounts; 2 × single 40 mm AA mounts; 2 × twin 20 mm guns AA mounts; 18 × single 20 mm mounts

USS Windsor (APA-55) was a Windsor-class attack transport in service with the United States Navy from 1943 to 1946. She was scrapped in 1972.

== History ==
The steel-hulled, single-screw cargo vessel was laid down as SS Excelsior under a Maritime Commission contract (MC hull 589) on 23 July 1942 at Sparrow's Point, Maryland, by the Bethlehem Sparrow's Point Shipyard; renamed Windsor and classified a transport, AP-100, on 5 October 1942; launched on 28 December 1942; sponsored by Miss Patricia Moreell, the daughter of Rear Admiral Ben Moreell, Chief of the Bureau of Yards and Docks; reclassified an attack transport, APA-55, on 16 June 1943; and commissioned at the Norfolk Navy Yard, Portsmouth, Virginia, on 17 June 1943.

=== Shakedown cruise ===
Windsor began her shakedown on 20 June and conducted eight training cruises in Chesapeake Bay. After post-shakedown availability, the ship departed the east coast of the United States on 9 December, bound for the Pacific. Upon reaching Pearl Harbor, Windsor became a unit of Transport Division (TransDiv) 4, 5th Fleet Amphibious Force.

=== Kwajalein ===
Windsor embarked the men and equipment of the 3d Battalion, 17th Regimental Combat Team, 7th Army Division, and departed the Hawaiian Islands on 22 January 1944, bound for the Marshall Islands as part of Task Force (TF) 52. Windsor participated in the assault landing at Kwajalein and, after the island had been secured early in February, sailed for the Ellice Islands.

=== Diversion to Humboldt Bay ===
Reaching Funafuti soon thereafter, Windsor there joined the 3rd Fleet and was subsequently ordered to Guadalcanal, Solomon Islands, for amphibious training and maneuvers. After shifting to Torokina, Bougainville, on 28 March and to Milne Bay, New Guinea, on 1 April, the attack transport was assigned to the 7th Fleet Amphibious Forces late in April.

Meanwhile, on 22 April, the 7th "Amphibs" had put ashore Army troops at Hollandia and took the Japanese completely by surprise. However, the following evening, a Japanese air raid blew up a captured ammunition dump and ensuing fires destroyed nearly 60 percent of the supplies landed.

As a result, Windsor—initially ordered to Tanahmerah Bay—was diverted to Humboldt Bay, Hollandia, as part of the effort to replenish the lost supplies. Upon arriving there on 24 April, she landed troops of the 2d Battalion of the American Army's 34th Infantry Division. Simultaneous with the landings at Tanahmerah and Humboldt Bays, the 7th Amphibious Force also put troops ashore to secure Aitape and its vital airstrip. Windsor participated in the Aitape landing, putting ashore various units of the 32nd Division on 3 May.

Windsor left New Guinea's waters on 7 May and headed for the Solomons, arriving at Guadalcanal three days later. At the end of May and the beginning of June, the attack transport embarked units of the 3rd Marine Division, left the Solomons on 4 June, and headed for the Central Pacific Area. She anchored first at Eniwetok and later at Kwajalein to prepare for and to await orders to begin her next operation, the occupation of Guam, in the Marianas.

=== Saipan ===
However, the amphibious forces first headed for Saipan -— regarded by some as the key to Japan's inner defenses. The assault on that island on 15 June resulted in the Japanese Fleet's challenging the Americans for the first time since the Battle of Midway, two years before. In the ensuing Battle of the Philippine Sea, on 19 and 20 June 1944, the enemy suffered heavily, losing three carriers. In the two-day battle, the Japanese Navy lost nearly 92 percent of its carrier-based aircraft (395 planes) as opposed to 130 planes lost by TF 58, the fast carrier task force under Vice Admiral Marc A. Mitscher.

=== Guam ===
Meanwhile, the unexpectedly stiff resistance on Saipan and the sortie of the Japanese Fleet had necessitated a delay in the landings on Guam. Finally, as part of Task Group (TG) 53.3, Windsor took part in the assault landings on Guam, landing troops of the 2d Battalion, 3d Marine Regiment, 3d Marine Division, on D-Day, 21 July, following close on the heels of intensive naval gunfire and carrier-based aircraft attacks. The attack transport put ashore her battle-garbed marines on the Asan beaches on the northern shores of Guam.

=== Peleliu ===
After the capture of the Marianas, the Navy turned its attention to the Western Caroline Islands. Fast carrier task forces ranged a wide area prior to the landings at Peleliu, Palau Islands, and Morotai, in the Netherlands East Indies, diverting or destroying Japanese forces that might have attempted to interfere with the invasion. Their planes struck Chichi Jima, Iwo Jima, Yap, Palau, and Mindanao, in the Philippines. Three days before the assault troops were slated to go ashore, ships and planes hurled an intensive air and surface bombardment against the Japanese defenses, while minesweepers cleared the waters off Peleliu and Angaur Islands, and underwater demolition teams destroyed beach obstructions. On 15 September, Windsor participated in the assault landings at Peleliu, putting ashore various elements of the 1st Marine Division, as part of TF 32.

=== Leyte ===
Following the successful landings on Peleliu, Windsor retired to Humboldt Bay and there was assigned to TF 78. A month later, the attack transport sortied as part of TF 78, bound for the Philippine Islands. While the ships proceeded north, the initial assault on Leyte began on 20 October when elements of the Army 10th and 24 Corps went ashore after heavy bombardment had softened up defenses ashore. Two days after D-Day, 22 October, Windsor arrived at Leyte; completed her unloading in record time; and stood out to sea later that day, bound once more for Humboldt Bay.

There, Windsor embarked another group of reinforcements and headed back toward Leyte on 9 November, as part of TF 79. One day out of San Pedro Bay, their destination, the task force came under an attack by Japanese planes that lasted for three hours. Windsor emerged unscathed and put into San Pedro Bay on the morning of 14 November, commencing her unloading at 0804 and completing it at 1315, having disembarked the troops and equipment of the 32d Division. During that time, Japanese planes attacked the ships at 0900; but antiaircraft fire from the vital auxiliaries and their escorts, coupled with Army fighter planes, drove off the enemy. At the completion of that particular reinforcement operation, Windsor's historian recorded: "The unloading time of five hours and nineteen minutes, averaging 95.9 tons per hour, was a new record for this ship and equalled by very few of the other transports in the Task Force."

Proceeding from San Pedro Bay later on the 14th, Windsor steamed to Manus, in the Admiralty Islands, and moved thence to Tulagi, Florida Island, Guadalcanal. Departing Tulagi on 27 November, Windsor headed for San Francisco, California. The attack transport subsequently underwent general repairs at Moore's Shipyard, Oakland, California, from 13 December 1944 to 16 February 1945.

She sailed for Hawaiian waters on 22 February. Routed onward to the western Pacific, Windsor departed Pearl Harbor on 20 March, with a contingent of construction battalion ("Seabees") troops embarked, and made calls at Eniwetok, Guam, and Samar, in the Philippines, discharging passengers and cargo in Guiuan roadstead, Samar, on 9 April. The attack transport lay off Samar for nearly two weeks before she received onward routing to return to San Francisco and, on her ensuing voyage, touched at Peleliu, Guam, Saipan, Tinian, and Pearl Harbor to pick up passengers. From San Francisco, Windsor headed up the west coast to Seattle, Washington, where she loaded general cargo and troops. She then returned to Pearl Harbor, reaching that port on 11 June and debarking the troops and discharging the cargo.

Shifting to Honolulu, Windsor there picked up troops slated for transportation to Okinawa and, as part of Task Unit (TU) 96.6.15, proceeded to Hagushi Beach, where she remained from 25 July to 5 August. During that time, the attack transport, together with other warships in the vicinity, came under almost nightly attacks from Japanese planes but emerged unscathed. Windsor then sailed for Ulithi in Convoy OKU-17, reaching her destination on 10 August.

=== End-of-war activity ===
While Windsor lay at anchor at Ulithi lagoon, Japan accepted the unconditional surrender terms of the Potsdam Declaration; and hostilities ceased on 14 August. On 19 August, Windsor, as part of TU 94.18.12, proceeded to the Philippines, reaching Leyte on the 23rd. From there, she proceeded to the island of Cebu, in the southern Philippines, where she was assigned to Trans Div 53, TF 33. After embarking troops of the American Division and supplies on 31 August, Windsor sailed for Japan as part of the Tokyo occupation force. As the initial increments went ashore between 8 September and 10, within a week of the formal Japanese surrender on 2 September, Windsor landed her troops. The attack transport returned to Cebu, loaded equipment, and embarked the troops of the Army's 77th Division, and landed that unit at Hakodate, Hokkaidō, in early October.

After the occupation of Japan, Windsor served under the aegis of Commander, Service Force, Pacific, reporting for duty with Operation Magic Carpet on 19 November. She remained in that duty for the remainder of 1945, participating in the massive sealift of returning sailors, soldiers, and marines to the United States.

=== Decommissioning and fate ===
After reporting to Commander, Western Sea Frontier, for disposition on 8 January 1946, Windsor received onward routing and transited the Panama Canal late in January, bound for the 8th Naval District. Decommissioned on 4 March 1946, Windsor was struck from the Navy list on 12 April 1946 and delivered to the War Shipping Administration, at Mobile, Alabama, on 1 August 1946, for disposition.

== Awards ==
Windsor earned five battle stars for her World War II service.
