= USS Grundy =

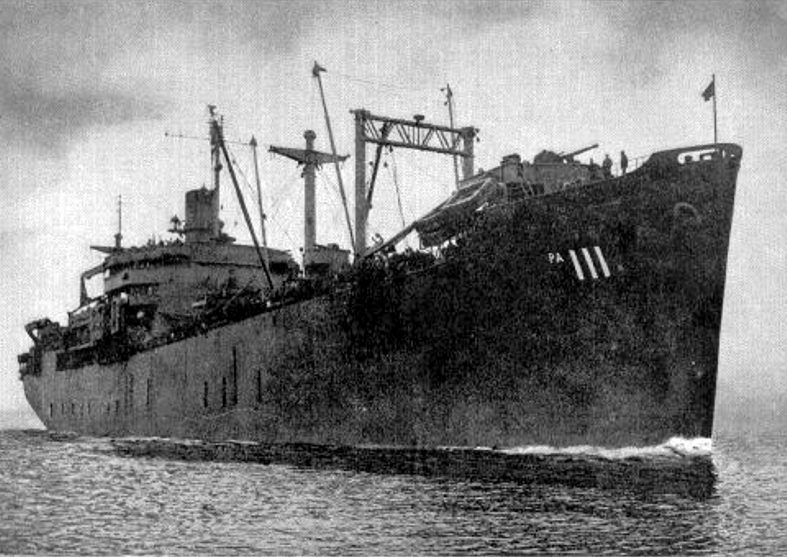

History

United States
- Name: USS Grundy
- Namesake: Grundy County, Illinois; Grundy County, Iowa; Grundy County, Missouri; Grundy County, Tennessee
- Builder: Ingalls Shipbuilding
- Launched: 16 June 1944
- Sponsored by: Mrs Lena Moore Gnatt
- Commissioned: 3 January 1945
- Decommissioned: 8 May 1946
- Fate: Scrapped in 1973

General characteristics
- Class & type: Windsor-class attack transport
- Displacement: 8,393 tons (lt)
- Length: 492 ft
- Beam: 69 ft 6 in
- Draft: 26 ft 6 in
- Propulsion: Steam turbine engine, single propeller, 8,000shp
- Speed: 18 knots
- Capacity: Troops: Officer 94 Enlisted 1,463; Cargo: 150,000 cu ft, 1,600 tons
- Complement: Officer 42 Enlisted 434
- Armament: 1 x 5"/38 caliber dual-purpose gun mounts, 2 x Bofors 40mm gun mounts, 2 x twin 20mm gun mounts, 18 x single 20mm gun mounts
- Notes: MCV Hull No. ?, hull type C3-S-A3

USS Grundy (APA-111) was a Windsor-class attack transport that served with the United States Navy from 1945 to 1946. She was subsequently sold in to commercial service and was scrapped in 1973.

== History ==
Grundy was launched under Maritime Commission contract 16 June 1944 by Ingalls Shipbuilding, Pascagoula, Mississippi; and commissioned 3 January 1945 Jose M Cabanillas commanding.

=== World War II ===
After loading supplies at New Orleans, the new transport conducted shakedown training out of Galveston, Texas, until 28 January 1945. She departed 4 February for her first assignment, as school ship for pre-commissioning crews at Newport, Rhode Island. Arriving Newport 10 February, Grundy held underway drills and training for the crews of nearly finished ships, helping to speed their delivery as active fighting units. This duty was completed 31 March, and Grundy sailed for Hampton Roads.

The ship arrived Norfolk, Virginia, 1 April and immediately embarked Seabees for transportation to the Pacific. Departing 14 April, she sailed to Pearl Harbor via the Panama Canal, arriving there 2 May 1945. At Pearl Harbor Grundy performed amphibious exercises and loaded cargo and passengers for the western Pacific. She departed 7 June; stopped at Eniwetok, Guam, and Saipan; and anchored 1 July at Ulithi to join an Okinawa-bound convoy.

Grundy departed in convoy for battle-scarred Okinawa 10 July, and after her arrival 4 days later unloaded her troops and cargo. She then sailed to Ulithi and Peleliu to bring troops from those islands to Guam, where she arrived 31 July. Grundy remained there until 2 August when she got underway for Pearl Harbor, unloading her supplies upon arrival 10 August. The war ended while Grundy was on her way to San Diego, where she arrived 19 August.

Her troop spaces loaded with replacement units, Grundy sailed from Seattle 1 September 1945, and after a stop at Eniwetok arrived Leyte 19 September. There she remained until 26 September, when the transport group of which she was a part departed for Yokohama with occupation troops. Arriving in Japan 4 days later, Grundy put ashore her contingent of the occupation forces, embarked veteran troops, and sailed for San Francisco 8 October. She arrived 19 October 1945.

==== Operation Magic Carpet ====
The busy transport's next duty was as part of the Magic-Carpet fleet, performing the gigantic task of returning the thousands of servicemen to the United States from the Pacific. Carrying replacement troops, she sailed 26 October for Okinawa, arriving 12 November. She then sailed for Shanghai, China, with troops to aid in the occupation and to help stabilize the tense situation there. Grundy arrived Shanghai 17 November, and sailed 23 November to embark a group of soldiers for transportation to Seattle from Korea. The transport sailed from Jinsen 5 December and arrived at her revised destination, Portland, Oregon, on Christmas Day 1945.

==== Decommissioning ====
Designated for return to the Maritime Commission, Grundy sailed via San Francisco and the Panama Canal to Norfolk, where she arrived 8 March 1946. She decommissioned 8 May, and was returned to the Maritime Commission 13 May.

=== Commercial service ===
The ship was subsequently acquired by Moore-McCormack Lines, Inc., in 1948, and renamed Mormacsurf. At 10:45 p.m. on 27 August 1957, it collided with the passenger ship "Ciudad de Buenos Aires" in the Río de la Plata, causing the latter to sink in just twenty minutes and killing almost 100 people. In 1966 she was part of a six-ship west coast fleet sold to Grace Lines, serving as Santa Anita. She was scrapped in 1973.
