= José M. Cabanillas =

United States admiral (1901–1979)

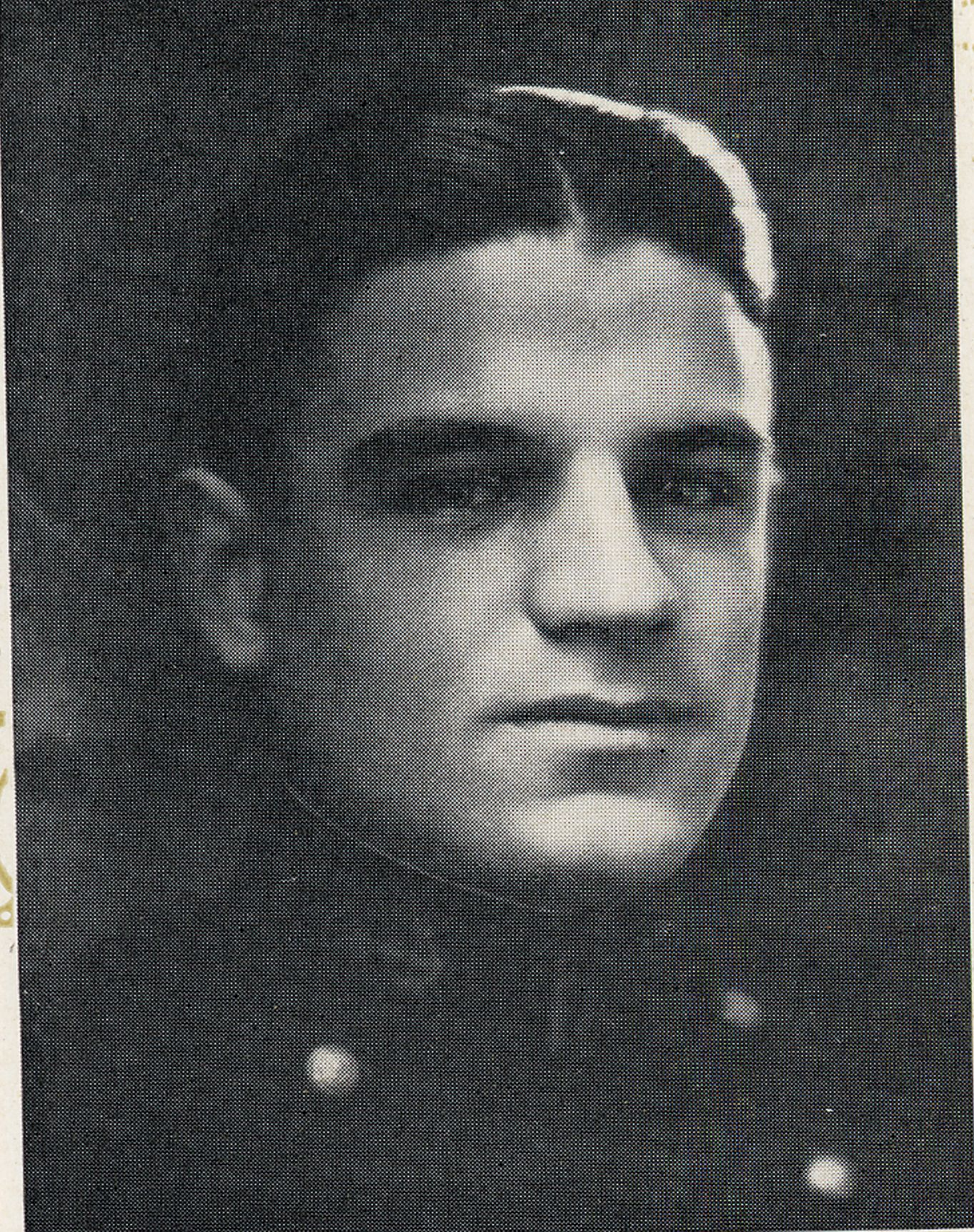
- Rear Admiral José M. Cabanillas
- Born: September 23, 1901; Mayagüez, Puerto Rico
- Died: September 5, 1979 (aged 77); Richmond, Virginia, US
- Burial place: cremated and buried at sea
- Military career
- Allegiance: United States
- Branch: United States Navy
- Service years: 1920–1955
- Rank: Rear Admiral
- Commands: USS Texas; USS Grundy; USS Dixie
- Conflicts: World War II: Operation Torch; Normandy landings; Operation Dragoon; Korean War: Battle of Inchon
- Awards: Bronze Star with "V" device

José Manuel Cabanillas (September 23, 1901 – September 15, 1979), was a rear admiral in the United States Navy who as an executive officer of the USS Texas participated in the invasions of North Africa, the Battle of Normandy (also known as D-Day), and the invasion of Southern France (Operation Dragoon) during World War II.

== Early years ==
Cabanillas was born to José C. Cabanillas and Asunción Grau de Cabanillas in the city of Mayagüez, which is located in the western coast of Puerto Rico. There he received his primary and secondary education. In 1917, at the age of 16, he was sent to Alabama to attend the Marion Military Institute. In the school he underwent a two-year preparatory course which prepared him for the United States Naval Academy.

== Naval career ==
He graduated from the institute in 1919 and on June 16, 1920, received an appointment from Arthur Yager, the U.S.-appointed governor of Puerto Rico from 1913 to 1921, to attend the United States Naval Academy. Cabanillas graduated from the Academy on June 4, 1924, and was commissioned an ensign in the U.S. Navy. Prior to World Wared aboard various cruisers, destroyers and submarines. Among the battleships that he served in were the USS Florida, USS Colorado and USS Oklahoma.

From June 1927 to January 1928, he received instruction in submarines and earned his Submarine Warfare Insignia badge at the Submarine Base, New London, Connecticut, after which he served in the USS S-3 until May 1930. Cabanillas earned a Master of Science in June 1932 from Yale University. Subsequent assignments included service as Squadron Radio and Sound Officer of Submarine Squadron 3, District Communications Officer in San Juan, Puerto Rico, executive officer of the USS Taylor (DD-94) in 1938 during the ship's decommissioning, ships company on USS Raleigh, and in 1939 as Radio Material Officer of the US Naval Communications Station at Balboa in the Panama Canal Zone, where he served until shortly after the attack on Pearl Harbor.

== World War II ==
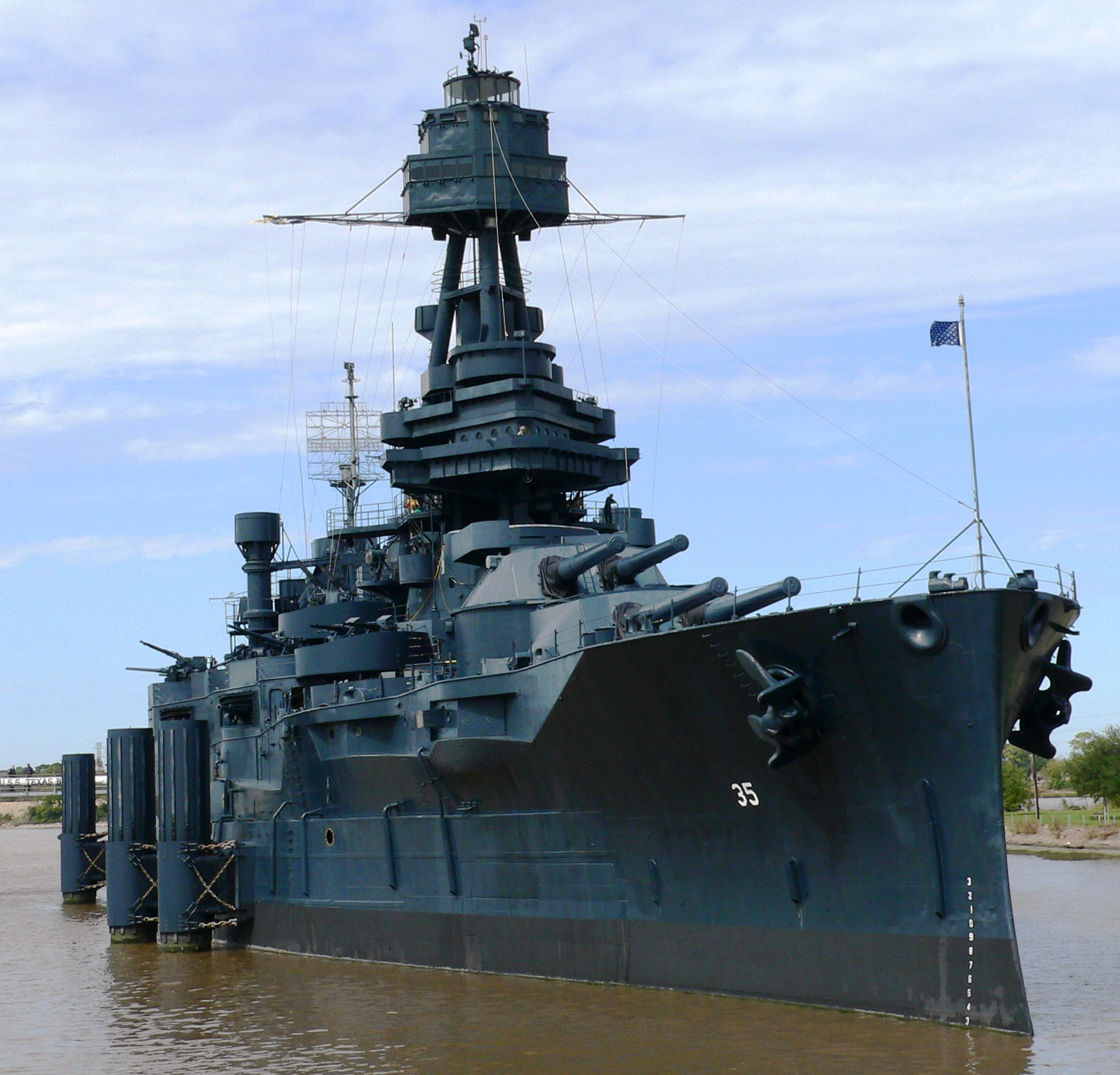
USS Texas

In June 1942, after the outbreak of World War II, he was assigned as Navigator of the USS Texas (BB-35), and later promoted to Executive Officer in December, 1943. The USS Texas was the oldest remaining dreadnought, and was one of only two remaining ships to have served in both world wars at that time. On November 8, 1942 the Texas participated in the invasion of North Africa by destroying an ammunition dump near Port Lyautey.

He was promoted to the rank of captain in July 1943 while serving as Executive Officer.

Cabanillas also participated in the invasion of Normandy on D-day, as the Texas provided gunfire support to the Ranger assault on Point du Hoc and targets on Omaha Beach. During subsequent days, Texas provided fire support as troops moved further inland, at one point flooding torpedo blisters to increase the list of the ship and increase the range of the main battery.

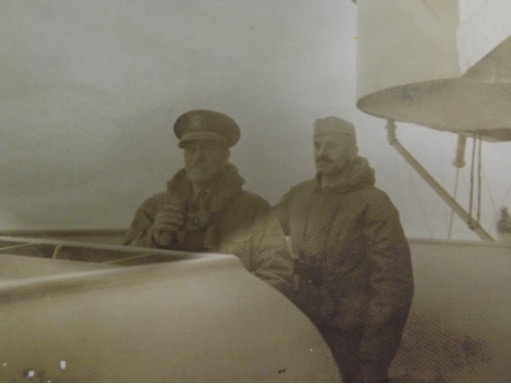
US Navy photograph of Captain Charles Baker, Commanding Officer and Captain Jose M Cabanillas, Executive Officer of USS Texas. Photographed near dawn on D-Day for Operation Overlord, June 6, 1944

On June 25, 1944, along with USS Arkansas and USS Nevada and supporting cruisers and destroyers, USS Texas was assigned to attack another target, Battery Hamburg in Cherbourg, France.

Cabanillas was awarded the Bronze Star Medal with Combat "V," for "meritorious achievement and outstanding performance of duty as executive officer of the USS Texas during the Invasion of Normandy and the bombardment of Cherbourg, where the Texas was struck by two shells from German shore fire, one striking the bridge below the pilothouse and killing the helmsman and forcing the transfer of control of the ship. His Bronze Star Medal citation reads as follows:

"Taking over ship control in the conning tower after an enemy shell had destroyed the bridge, the primary control station, Captain Cabanillas rendered invaluable service to his commanding officer in the performance of the assigned mission..."

He remained as executive officer of the Texas during the invasion of Southern France (Operation Dragoon) and detached from the ship, along with several hundred of her crew, after the Texas returned to the United States in September 1944 for his next assignment to the USS Grundy.

Cabanillas became the first commanding officer of the USS Grundy, which was commissioned on January 3, 1945. After service in the Pacific during the end of the war in 1945, the Grundy helped in the evacuation of Americans from China during the Chinese Civil War. Under his command, the Grundy earned the following citations: China Service Medal (extended), American Campaign Medal, Asiatic-Pacific Campaign Medal, World War II Victory Medal and the Navy Occupation Service Medal (with Asia clasp). In December 1945, he was reassigned to Naval Station Norfolk located in Norfolk, Virginia, as Assistant Chief of Staff (Discipline), 5th Naval District.

In July 1949, Cabanillas was assigned as commanding officer of United States Naval Station Orange in Orange, Texas,.

== Korean War ==
In July 1950, he became commanding officer of the USS Dixie, a destroyer tender in the Pacific. During the Korean War, Dixie provided firing cover to the U.S. Marines involved in the Inchon invasion. In 1951, Cabanillas was reassigned to the staff of the United States Pacific Fleet in Hawaii. In 1953, he was transferred to the fifth Naval District in San Juan, Puerto Rico as chief of staff.

== Later years ==
José M. Cabanillas - 1959

Cabanillas retired from the United States Navy in 1955 and moved to Richmond, Virginia. In 1956, Cabanillas made use of the benefits of the G.I. Bill and studied law at the University of Richmond School of Law. He passed the Virginia Bar at the end of his second year. He served as law librarian at the University for 6 years and then joined a Richmond law firm.

Cabanillas died on September 15, 1979, at the Hunter Holmes McGuire Veterans Administration Medical Center in Richmond. He was the first Puerto Rican to make rear admiral in the US Navy, albeit a tombstone promotion. He was cremated and buried at sea with full military honors.

In 2023 José M. Cabanillas was posthumously inducted to the Puerto Rico Veterans Hall of Fame.

== Awards and recognitions ==
Among Rear Admiral José M. Cabanillas' decorations and medals were the following:

Submarine Officers Warfare insignia
Bronze Star with Combat "V" for Valor	American Defense Service Medal with one service star	American Campaign Medal	European–African–Middle Eastern Campaign Medal with three service stars
Asiatic-Pacific Campaign Medal with one service star	World War II Victory Medal	Navy Occupation Service Medal (with Asia clasp)	China Service Medal
National Defense Service Medal	Korean Service Medal w/ with silver service star	United Nations Korea Medal	Republic of Korea Presidential Unit Citation

== See also ==
- Hispanic Admirals in the United States Navy
- List of Puerto Ricans
- Puerto Ricans in World War II
- List of Puerto Rican military personnel
- Hispanics in the United States Naval Academy
- Hispanics in the United States Navy
