= USS Adair =

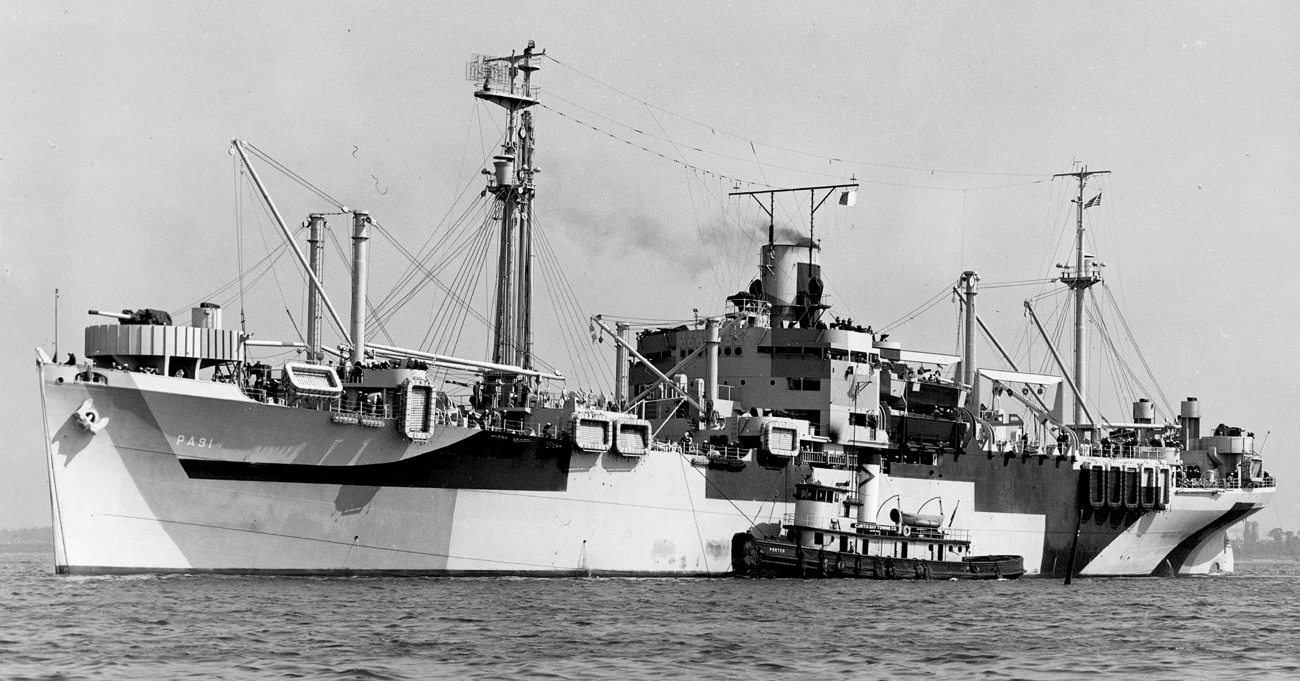
- Adair on 17 July 1944

History

United States
- Name: USS Adair
- Namesake: Adair County, Iowa; Adair County, Kentucky; Adair County, Missouri
- Builder: Bethlehem Steel
- Launched: 29 February 1944
- Sponsored by: Mrs Elsie N. Keefer
- Christened: Exchester
- Acquired: 15 July 1944
- Commissioned: 15 July 1944
- Decommissioned: 30 April 1946
- Honors and awards: Two battle stars for World War II service
- Fate: Scrapped, 1970

General characteristics
- Class & type: Windsor-class attack transport
- Displacement: 7,970 tons (lt), 13,132 t. (fl)
- Length: 473 ft 11 in
- Beam: 66 ft
- Draft: 25 ft
- Propulsion: Bethlehem geared turbine drive, 2 × Babcock & Wilcox header-type boilers, single propeller, designed shaft horsepower 8,000
- Speed: 18.6 knots
- Capacity: Troops: 1,514; Cargo: 150,000 cu ft, 1,600 tons
- Complement: 555
- Armament: 2 × 5"/38 caliber dual-purpose gun mounts, 2 × twin Bofors 40mm gun mounts, 18 × single 20mm gun mounts.
- Notes: Maritime Commission Hull No. 594, hull type C3-S-A3

USS Adair (APA-91) was a Windsor-class attack transport in service with the United States Navy from 1944 to 1946. She was sold to commercial service in 1947 and was finally scrapped in 1970.

== History ==
Laid down as Exchester, Adair (APA-91) was named after counties in Iowa, Kentucky, and Missouri. She was launched 29 February 1944 by Bethlehem Sparrows Point Shipyard, Sparrows Point, Maryland, under a Maritime Commission contract; transferred to the Navy 15 July 1944; and commissioned the same day.

=== 1944–1947 ===
During 1944 and 1945 Adair carried troops and cargo between Pearl Harbor, Eniwetok, Saipan, Tinian, Ulithi, Hollandia, Manus, and Guam, with two diversions to amphibious duty. From 11 to 12 January 1945 she participated in the Lingayen Gulf landings and from 1 to 5 April 1945 in the Invasion of Okinawa.

With the end of World War II, she supported the occupation of Korea (September–October) and China (16–30 December). She also served with the Operation Magic Carpet fleet, returning American servicemen to the United States from the Pacific. Adair reported to Commander, 5th Naval District, 8 March 1946; was decommissioned 30 April 1946; and returned to the Maritime Commission 3 May 1946. She was struck from the Navy Vessel Register on 8 May 1946.

=== 1947–1970 ===
Adair was sold in 1947 to American Export Lines, Inc., New York, who renamed her SS Express. Later, she was sold again to the Mutual Steamship Operating Company. She was scrapped in 1970.

== Awards ==
Adair received two battle stars for her World War II service.
