= USS Eberle =

Gleaves-class destroyer

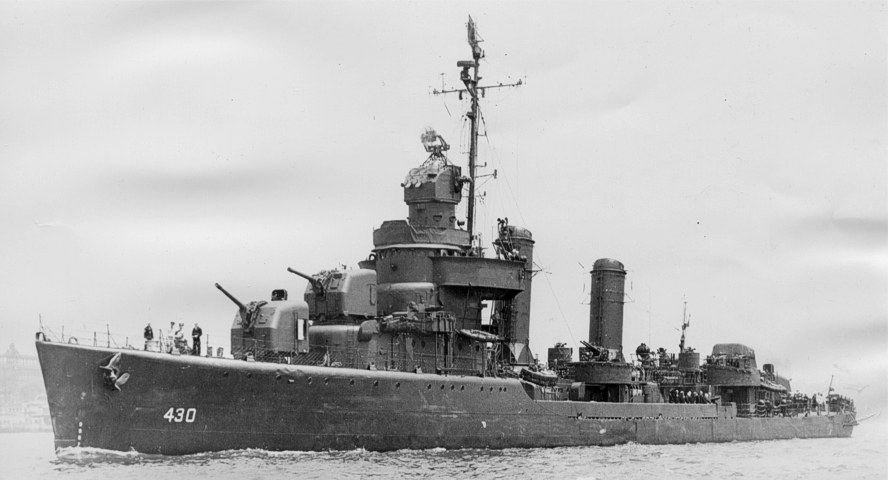
- USS Eberle (DD-430) underway off New York City, 8 June 1945

History

United States
- Name: USS Eberle
- Namesake: Edward Walter Eberle
- Builder: Bath Iron Works
- Laid down: 12 April 1939
- Launched: 14 September 1940
- Commissioned: 4 December 1940
- Decommissioned: 3 June 1946
- Stricken: 24 January 1951
- Identification: Callsign: NIBD
- Fate: transferred to Greece, 22 January 1951

Greece
- Name: Niki
- Acquired: 22 January 1951
- Stricken: 1972
- Fate: Scrapped in 1972

General characteristics
- Class & type: Gleaves-class destroyer
- Displacement: 1,630 tons
- Length: 348 ft 3 in (106.15 m)
- Beam: 36 ft 1 in (11.00 m)
- Draft: 11 ft 10 in (3.61 m)
- Propulsion: 50,000 shp (37,000 kW); 4 boilers; 2 propellers
- Speed: 37.4 kn (69.3 km/h; 43.0 mph)
- Range: 6,500 nmi (12,000 km; 7,500 mi) at 12 kn (22 km/h; 14 mph)
- Complement: 16 officers, 260 enlisted
- Armament: 5 × 5 in (127 mm) DP guns, 6 × .50 cal (12.7 mm) guns, 6 × 20 mm AA guns, 10 × 21 in (533 mm) torpedo tubes, 2 × depth charge tracks

USS Eberle (DD-430) was a Gleaves-class destroyer of the United States Navy. The ship is named for Rear Admiral Edward Walter Eberle, who commanded the Atlantic and Pacific Fleets and was Chief of Naval Operations from 1923 to 1927. The destroyer entered service in 1940 and spent the majority of her career in the Atlantic Ocean. Placed in reserve following the war, the ship was transferred to the Hellenic Navy in 1951. Renamed Niki, the destroyer remained in service until 1972 when she was scrapped.

== Construction and career ==
Eberle was launched on 14 September 1940 by Bath Iron Works Corp., Bath, Maine; sponsored by Miss Mildred Eberle, granddaughter of Rear Admiral Eberle. The ship was commissioned on 4 December 1940.

After training in the Caribbean and along the East Coast, Eberle was assigned to patrol duty off Bermuda until the end of August 1941, when she began to escort convoys to Newfoundland, Iceland and far northern bases. She guarded the vital western Atlantic end of the lifeline to Britain before and after the US entry into the war. Once she reached Scotland. Returning to Norfolk, Virginia on 23 August 1942, she sailed two days later, escorting tankers by way of Galveston to Cristóbal and another convoy from Trinidad to Belém, and back to Norfolk 8 October.

Eberle sortied from Norfolk 25 October 1942 for the invasion of North Africa, and gave bombardment and fire support for the landings at Mehedia, French Morocco on 8 November. Returning to Norfolk on 27 November, she sailed on 26 December for South Atlantic patrol, based on Recife, Brazil. On 10 March 1943 she intercepted the German blockade runner Karin. When Eberle boarded, demolition charges set by the Germans exploded, killing half the 14-man boarding party outright. The remaining seven persisted in their efforts to save Karin and obtain information until fire and further explosions forced them to abandon ship. They and 72 prisoners were picked up from the water by Eberle.

After overhaul at Charleston, Eberle returned to escort duty, making five voyages to north African ports between 13 April 1943 and 31 January 1944. She returned to Oran on 22 February and after amphibious training, arrived at Naples on 11 March, her base for patrol and bombardment until May. On 20 April she broke up an attack by German E-boats on the transport anchorage — sinking one and damaging three others so badly that they were subsequently beached.

Eberle continued patrol and escort duty in the Mediterranean, then sailed from Malta 13 August 1944 for the invasion of southern France (15 August), where she saw action. On 21 August she bombarded Île de Porquerolles until a white flag was seen. A landing force took 58 prisoners of war whose escape boats had been destroyed by Eberle's fire, 14 more Germans surrendered the following day.

Returning to New York on 6 November 1944, Eberle escorted two convoys to Oran by April 1945. After overhaul and training she sailed from New York 8 June for the Pacific, arriving at Pearl Harbor on 20 July to join the aircraft carrier Antietam for plane guard duty. She departed on 1 November for Alaskan waters and called at Petropavlovsk, in Russian Kamchatka, from 1 to 5 December, before returning to Pearl Harbor on 15 December.

=== Convoys escorted ===
Convoy	Escort group	Dates	Notes
HX 150		17-25 Sept 1941	from Newfoundland to Iceland prior to US declaration of war
ON 22		7-15 Oct 1941	from Iceland to Newfoundland prior to US declaration of war
HX 157		30 Oct-8 Nov 1941	from Newfoundland to Iceland prior to US declaration of war
ON 35		15-27 Nov 1941	from Iceland to Newfoundland prior to US declaration of war
AT 18		6-17 Aug 1942	troopships from New York City to Firth of Clyde

=== Post World War II service ===
Eberle left Pearl Harbor 6 January 1946 and reached Charleston, South Carolina, 8 February. She was placed out of commission in reserve there 3 June 1946. On 12 August she was assigned to the Naval Reserve Training program in the 3rd Naval District. After being towed to New York in September, she was placed "in-service" 13 January 1947 and carried Naval Reservists on cruises to Canada, the Caribbean, and Bermuda. During this time she was placed in commission in reserve 19 May 1950 and in full commission 21 November 1950.

=== Disposal and Greek service ===
Eberle arrived at Boston 21 January 1951, was decommissioned the following day and transferred to Greece under the Mutual Defense Assistance Program. She served in the Greek navy as Niki until she was stricken and scrapped in 1972.

Eberle received three battle stars for World War II service.
