= USS Griggs =

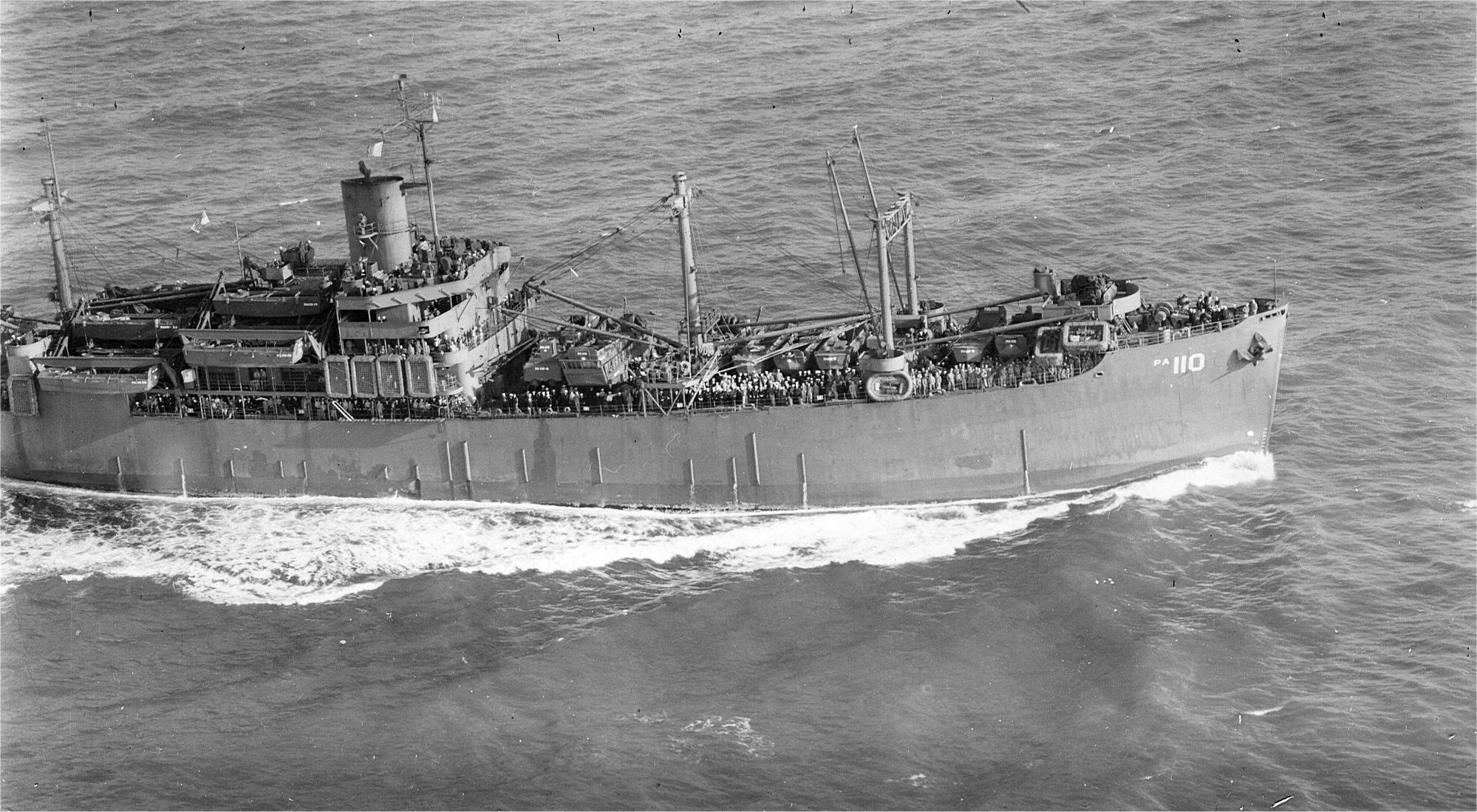

History

United States
- Name: USS Griggs (APA-110)
- Namesake: Griggs County, North Dakota
- Builder: Ingalls Shipbuilding
- Sponsored by: Mrs Betty Bennett Banker
- Acquired: 13 December 1944
- Commissioned: 14 December 1944
- Decommissioned: 27 May 1946
- Stricken: 19 June 1946
- Fate: Scrapped 1973

General characteristics
- Class & type: Windsor-class attack transport
- Displacement: 7,970 long tons (8,100 metric tons) (lt), 13,143 ong tons (13,354 metric tons) (fl)
- Length: 492 ft 1 in
- Beam: 69 ft 6 in
- Draft: 26 ft 6 in
- Speed: 18 knots
- Capacity: Troops: Officer 94 Enlisted 1,463; Cargo: 150,000 cu ft, 1,600 long tons
- Complement: Officer 42 Enlisted 434
- Armament: 1 x 5"/38 caliber dual-purpose gun mounts, 8 x Bofors 40 mm L/60 gun mounts
- Notes: MCV Hull No. ?, hull type C3-S-A3

USS Griggs (APA-110) was a Windsor-class attack transport that served with the United States Navy from 1944 to 1946. She was subsequently sold into commercial service and was scrapped in 1973.

== History ==
Griggs (APA-110), was named after a county in North Dakota. A Type C3 ship, she was built by Ingalls Shipbuilding of Pascagoula, Mississippi; acquired by the Navy on a loan-charter basis 13 December 1944; and commissioned 14 December 1944.

=== World War II ===
After shakedown at Galveston, Texas, Griggs trained precommissioning crews out of Newport, Rhode Island, before reaching Norfolk, Virginia 31 March 1945. There she embarked 40 officers and 1,416 men of the 41st Marine Depot Company and the 55th Marine Replacement Draft.

Clearing Norfolk 26 May Griggs sailed via Canal Zone and discharged her passengers at San Francisco 1 June 1945. She departed Port Hueneme 17 June with 1,032 Seabees embarked and touched at Eniwetok and Ulithi before discharging her passengers at Okinawa and Manila Bay, Philippine Islands.

After delivering occupation troops to Japan from Lingayen Gulf and Mindanao, Griggs took up Operation Magic Carpet duty and departed Saipan 2 November 1945, en route to San Diego, where she arrived 13 days later with many war veterans. Griggs made two more "Magic Carpet" voyages returning to San Francisco from her last trip 21 February 1946.

Departing San Pedro, California, 12 March 1946, Griggs sailed via Canal Zone and reached Norfolk 28 March. She remained there until decommissioned at Portsmouth Navy Yard, Portsmouth, Virginia, 27 May 1946. Delivered to the War Shipping Administration the next day, her name was stricken from the Navy List 19 June 1946.

=== Commercial service ===
Sold to Moore-McCormack Lines 21 April 1948, she became Mormacrey. In 1966 she was sold to Grace Shipping Company and renamed Santa Alicia. In 1973 she was scrapped.
