= USS Feland =

Doyen-class attack transport

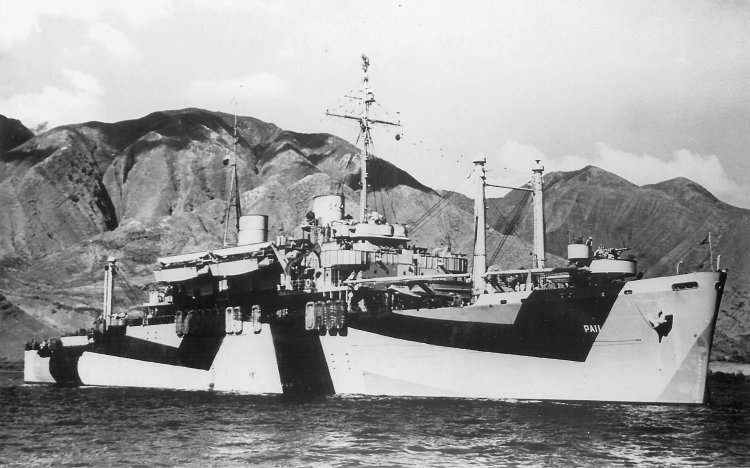
- Feland in 1944

History

United States
- Name: USS Feland (APA-11)
- Namesake: General Logan Feland, USMC
- Builder: Consolidated Steel
- Launched: 10 November 1942
- Sponsored by: Mrs L. Feland, widow of General Feland
- Acquired: 20 April 1943
- Commissioned: 21 June 1943
- Decommissioned: 15 March 1946
- Reclassified: AP-18 to APA-11, 1 February 1943
- Identification: MC hull type P1-S2-L2, MC hull no. 182
- Honours and awards: Five battle stars for World War II service
- Fate: Scrapped 1964

General characteristics
- Class & type: Doyen-class attack transport
- Displacement: 4,351 tons (lt), 6,720 tons (fl)
- Length: 414 ft 6 in (126.34 m)
- Beam: 56 ft (17 m)
- Draft: 19 ft (5.8 m)
- Propulsion: Geared turbine engines, twin screws, horsepower 8,800
- Speed: 19 knots
- Boats & landing craft carried: 16 x LCVP's
- Capacity: Troops 1,100
- Complement: 453
- Armament: 4 x 3"/50 caliber dual-purpose gun mounts, 4 x twin 40mm guns, 8 x 20 mm guns

USS Feland (APA-11) was a Doyen-class attack transport in service with the United States Navy from 1943 to 1946. She was scrapped in 1964.

== History ==
Feland was launched 10 November 1942 as a troop transport, designation AP-18, by Consolidated Steel Corporation, Los Angeles, California; sponsored by Mrs. L. Feland, widow of General Feland; and commissioned 21 June 1943. She was redesignated an attack transport on 1 February 1943.

Feland carried marines from San Diego, California, to Pago Pago, arriving 24 August 1943, then sailed on to New Zealand for landing exercises, which she continued at Efate in November.

=== Invasion of Tarawa ===
On 13 November, she sortied from Efate for the invasion of Tarawa on 20 November, and for 8 days lay off the bitterly contested island, landing reserve troops, loading casualties, and re-embarking troops when the island was secured. These men she carried to Pearl Harbor, arriving 7 December. After training operations and brief overhaul, Feland put to sea with soldiers 22 January 1944, bound for Kwajalein. She landed the troops as reserves on 1 February, one day after the initial assault, and re-embarked them a week later when the atoll had been won. Feland returned to Honolulu with troops and casualties 15 February, landed them, embarked passengers, and sailed for a U.S. West Coast overhaul.

=== Invasion of Saipan ===
The transport returned to Pearl Harbor 6 May 1944, and after training, arrived at Eniwetok 9 June. Two days later, combat loaded, she sailed for the invasion of Saipan, and on 15 June took part in a demonstration landing at Tanapag Harbor, while the main assault was made north of Charan-Kanoa. The next day Feland began to send troops and cargo ashore, but that night was ordered to retire from the island, to avoid the danger of an expected Japanese attack. She returned 21 June to complete unloading and embark casualties for Honolulu.

=== Invasion of Guam ===
Feland returned to Eniwetok 17 July 1944 with troops for the assault on Guam, where she landed them 22 July, one day after the initial landings. Again she sailed back to the Hawaiians with casualties, and to begin training for the liberation of the Philippines. Manus was her jumping off point for this operation, and she arrived in Leyte Gulf 20 October to unload in the transport area off Dulag and retire next day, before the outbreak of the Battle of Leyte Gulf.

=== Invasion of the Philippines ===
After one voyage to bring elements of the 188th Glider Infantry Regiment of the 11th Airborne Division from New Guinea to Leyte, Feland embarked soldiers at Aitape, from which she sailed 28 December 1944 in the San Fabian attack force. In the initial assault in Lingayen Gulf 9 January 1945 she landed troops and cargo in record time, despite heavy mortar fire from shore which wounded two of her men handling landing craft. She cleared the beachhead next day, and that evening fired on a Japanese suicide plane which veered away, selecting another target. After calling at Leyte and Ulithi, she sailed to Guam to take aboard Marines for the Iwo Jima operation.

=== Invasion of Iwo Jima ===
Arriving off Iwo Jima 19 February 1945, Feland's troops were held in reserve until 27 February, when they were landed through heavy surf on a difficult beach. She carried casualties to Guam, then sailed for Manus and Noumea to load soldiers for transportation to Leyte. Between 28 May and 16 July, she carried military passengers between ports in New Guinea and the Philippines, then sailed for a U.S. West Coast overhaul. This was completed in October.

=== Decommissioning and fate ===
After one further voyage to the Philippines with cargo, Feland returned to Seattle, Washington, 20 November and was decommissioned there on 15 March 1946. Subsequently, she was transferred to the Maritime Commission and laid up in the National Defense Reserve Fleet. She was scrapped in 1964.

== Awards ==
Feland received five battle stars for World War II service:

- Gilbert Islands operation - Tarawa, 20 November to 28 November 1943
- Marshall Islands operation - Occupation of Kwajalein and Majuro Atolls, 1 February to 7 February 1944
- Marianas operation - Capture and occupation of Saipan, 15 June to 21 June 1944; Capture and occupation to Guam, 22 July 1944
- Leyte operation - Leyte landings, 20 October to 21 October 1944
- Luzon operation - Lingayen Gulf landings, 9 January to 10 January 1945
- Iwo Jima operation - Assault and occupation of Iwo Jima, 19 February 1945
