= Windsor-class attack transport =

Type of WWII US naval vessel

Windsor-class
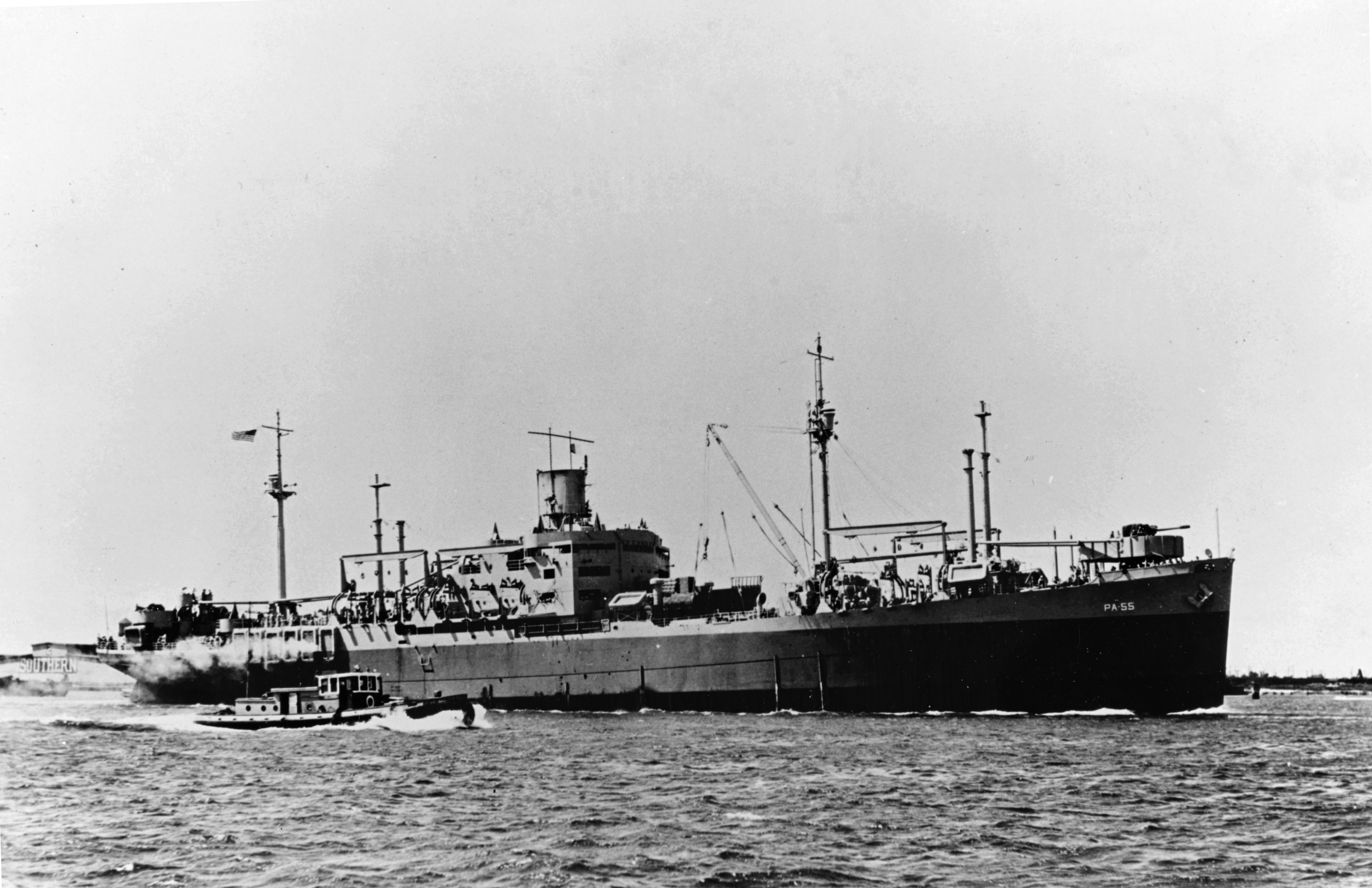
- USS Windsor (APA-55), lead ship of the Windsor class, 1943

Class overview
- Builders: Bethlehem Steel (x7); Ingalls Shipbuilding (x2)
- Operators: United States Navy
- Preceded by: Doyen class
- Succeeded by: Ormsby class
- In commission: June 1943 - June 1946
- Completed: 9
- Active: None

General characteristics
- Type: attack transport
- Displacement: 7,970 tons (lt), 13,132 t. (fl)
- Length: 472–492 ft (144–150 m)
- Beam: 66–69.5 ft (20.1–21.2 m)
- Draft: 25–26.5 ft (7.6–8.1 m)
- Propulsion: Steam turbine engine, single propeller, 8,000 shp (6,000 kW)
- Speed: 18 knots (33 km/h; 21 mph)
- Capacity: Troops: Officer 94 Enlisted 1,463 Cargo:150,000 cu ft (4,200 m^{3}), 1,600 tons
- Complement: 91 officers, 522 enlisted
- Armament: Variable, but usually 1 x 5"/38 caliber dual-purpose gun mounts, 2 x Bofors 40mm gun mounts, 2 x twin 20mm gun mounts, 18 x single 20mm gun mounts
- Notes: MCV hull types C3-S-A1, C3-S-A3, possibly also C3-S-A2 or C3-S1-A3

The Windsor-class attack transport was a class of nine US Navy attack transports. Ships of the class saw service in World War II.

Like all attack transports, the purpose of the Windsors was to transport troops and their equipment to foreign shores in order to execute amphibious invasions using an array of smaller assault boats integral to the attack transport itself. The class was well armed with antiaircraft weaponry to protect itself and its cargo of troops from air attack in the battle zone.

== Class history ==
The Windsor class is inconsistently documented in the US Navy's official Dictionary of American Naval Fighting Ships (DANFS). Its class of nine ships were based upon three variants of the Maritime Commission's ubiquitous C3 cargo type; unusually, they appear to be of more than one subtype. This is probably reflects the class entering service in fits and starts, the first two vessels from June 1943 and the remaining seven between July 1944 and January 1945.

The early Windsors were based upon the C3-S-A1 hull, followed by several on the C3-S-A3; however, the last two, USS Griggs (APA-110) and USS Grundy (APA-111), have length, beam and draft specifications which are inconsistent with their listed subtype, but consistent (in larger length and beam) with the C3-S-A2 hull.

Also, Griggs and Grundy were built by Ingalls Shipbuilding in Pascagoula, Mississippi, where the large majority of C3-S-A2 based ships subsequently modified to Bayfield-class attack transports were produced. The other seven Windsors were built by Bethlehem Steel at its Sparrows Point Shipyard in Baltimore, Maryland where few if any Bayfields were built.

Since ships of a given class usually have the same dimensions either the Windsor-class was constructed of three different C3 hull types, which would make it quite unusual, or DANFS has listed the subtype incorrectly.

Other unusual aspects in regards to this class is that they are listed with a variety of different armaments. Early models had two five-inch guns while the later ships had only one; the Leedstown was at least initially fitted with 1.1" antiaircraft guns instead of 40mm; and Griggs is listed with 8 x 40mm guns and no 20mm, whereas the other ships are listed with a maximum of 2 x 40mm and 22 x 20mm. The Windsors also appear to be more lightly armed than most other attack transport classes, particularly with respect to the 40mm weapon which was considered far more effective than the 20mm gun which comprised most of the Windsor's armament.

=== In service ===
Ships of the Windsor class served exclusively in the Pacific Theatre. The first two ships of the class, the USS Windsor (APA-55) and USS Leedstown (APA-56), were built and commissioned in mid-1943, much earlier than the later units. Consequently, they saw much more action, both earning at least five battle stars. The next two were not commissioned until at least July 1944 and only saw three combat operations between them. The remaining five ships arrived too late to see combat and served out the war on transport and training missions.

After V-J Day, the Windsors, like virtually all classes of attack transport, were assigned first to transporting fresh troops to occupation missions in Japan and its former occupied territories such as China and Korea, and later to Operation Magic Carpet, the giant sealift organized to bring millions of demobilizing servicemen back to the United States.

The class as a whole was subsequently demobilized in early 1946, and the individual ships sold into commercial service, mostly as cargo ships. Most of the ships were scrapped in the early-to-mid-1970s, having enjoyed overall service lives of approximately 30 years. A notable exception was the USS Queens (APA-103). Following her refurbishment and service as passenger-cargo ship SS Excambion, she was loaned to the Texas Maritime Academy in April 1965 and spent the next 30 years as training ship USTS Texas Clipper. She was finally decommissioned in 1995 and sunk as an artificial reef in 2007. Another Windsor class ship, USS Dauphin (APA-97) served as passenger-cargo ship SS Exochorda before becoming dormitory ship SS Stevens for Stevens Institute of Technology in 1967.

== Ships in class ==
- Windsor
- Leedstown
- Adair
- Dauphin
- Dutchess
- Queens
- Shelby
- Griggs
- Grundy
