= USS Doyen (APA-1) =

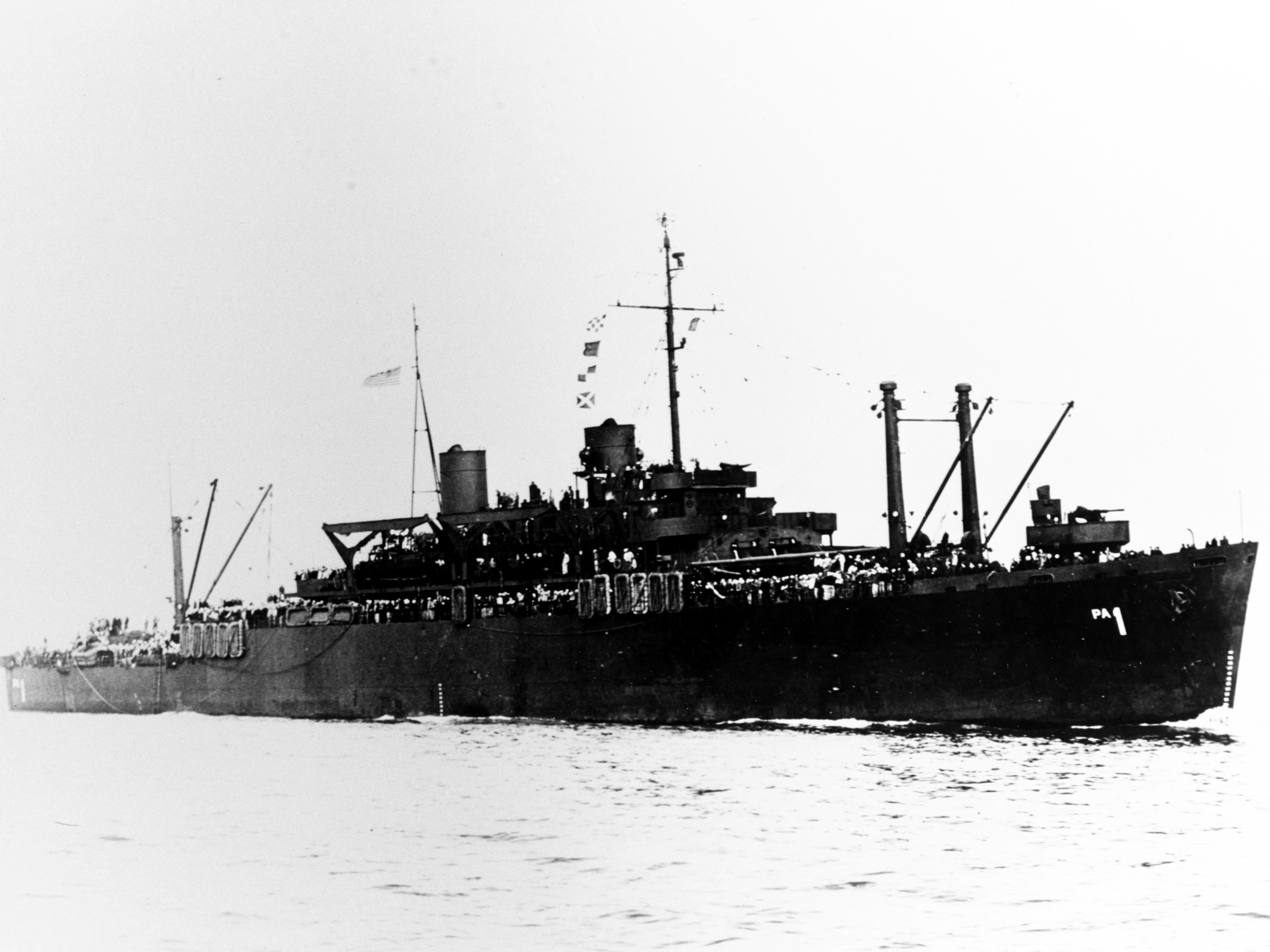
- Doyen in 1945

History

United States
- Name: USS Doyen
- Namesake: BGen Charles A. Doyen, USMC
- Builder: Consolidated Steel
- Launched: 9 July 1942
- Sponsored by: Miss. F. D. Johnson, granddaughter of BGen Doyen
- Acquired: 20 April 1943
- Commissioned: 22 May 1943
- Decommissioned: 20 March 1946
- Reclassified: AP-2 to APA-1, 1 February 1943
- Stricken: 22 March 1946
- Identification: MC hull type P1-S2-L2, MC hull no. 181
- Honors and awards: Six battle stars for World War II service
- Fate: Sold for scrap, 23 January 1973

General characteristics
- Class & type: Doyen-class attack transport
- Displacement: 4,351 tons (lt)
- Length: 414 ft 6 in (126.34 m)
- Beam: 56 ft (17 m)
- Draft: 19 ft (5.8 m)
- Propulsion: 2 x turbine engines, twin screws, horsepower 8,000
- Speed: 18 knots
- Complement: 453
- Armament: 4 x 3"/50 caliber dual-purpose gun mounts, secondary armament unknown

USS Doyen (APA-1) was a Doyen-class attack transport in service with the United States Navy from 1943 to 1946. She was scrapped in 1973.

== History ==
She was the second Navy ship named for United States Marine Corps Brigadier General Charles A. Doyen (1859–1918), who served in World War I, commanding 5th Marine Regiment, 4th Brigade, and 2nd Infantry Division.

Doyen was launched as transport AP-2 on 9 July 1942 by Consolidated Steel of Los Angeles, California, under a Maritime Commission contract; sponsored by Miss F. D. Johnson, granddaughter of BGen Doyen; reclassified APA-1, 1 February 1943; acquired by the Navy 20 April 1943 and converted at Bethlehem Steel of San Pedro, California; and commissioned 22 May 1943.

=== Invasion of Kiska ===
Doyen sailed from San Francisco on 9 July 1943 carrying troops to the Aleutians for the invasion of Kiska from 14 to 21 August, then returned by way of Pearl Harbor to San Francisco, arriving on 11 September. A week later she got underway from San Diego to embark Marines at Pearl Harbor for New Zealand.

=== Invasion of Tarawa ===
She arrived at Wellington 24 October and on 1 November sailed with men of the 2nd Marine Division for the assault on the Gilbert Islands. From 20 to 24 November she landed her troops on Tarawa and embarked casualties under attack from enemy shore batteries and torpedo planes. After bringing her passengers to Pearl Harbor, Doyen returned to the west coast for training duty, arriving at San Diego on 18 December.

=== Invasions of Kwajalein, Saipan and Guam ===
Doyen got underway 13 January 1944 for the invasion of Kwajalein, landing her troops the last day of the month and receiving casualties and prisoners of war for transportation to Pearl Harbor where she arrived on 15 February. She remained in the Hawaiian Islands on training duty until 30 May when she sailed for Eniwetok thence to the invasion of Saipan from 16 to 22 June and Guam from 22 to 28 July.

=== Invasion of Leyte ===
Doyen arrived at Manus 3 October 1944 to join up for the invasion of the Philippines. She put her troops ashore in the assault in Leyte Gulf on 20 and 21 October, then sailed to Humboldt Bay, New Guinea, for reinforcements whom she landed in Leyte Gulf on 18 November.

=== Invasions of Lingayen Gulf and Iwo Jima ===
Returning to Manus on 24 November Doyen loaded Army troops at Cape Torokina, Bougainville, and trained them at Huon Gulf, New Guinea, for the amphibious assault at Lingayen Gulf on 9 and 10 January 1945. After repairs at Ulithi, she loaded cargo and embarked Marines at Guam. On 16 February she sailed for the initial assault on Iwo Jima on 19 February. She lay off the island to receive casualties whom she landed at Saipan on 9 March, then carried Seabees to Guam before arriving at Nouméa on 23 March for repairs and training.

=== Transport missions ===
Doyen left Nouméa 3 May 1945 to carry troops to San Pedro Bay, Leyte, then sailed to Guam to embark patients, with whom she arrived at San Diego on 17 June. After a complete overhaul, she carried troops and returning veterans between the west coast and Pearl Harbor from 28 September to 30 December.

=== Decommissioning and fate ===
On 4 January 1946 she put out from Seattle for the east coast, arriving at New York on 4 February. Doyen was decommissioned on 22 March 1946, and transferred to the Maritime Commission for disposal on 26 June 1946. The Doyen received a reprieve from the scrap yard as it was renamed the Bay State, and served as a training vessel, dormitory and classroom for the Massachusetts Maritime Academy in Buzzards Bay from 1957 to 1972 under the name USTS Bay State. The story of the ship's service in the Pacific during World War II as well as later as the Bay State is chronicled by Lt. Cdr. Lawrence A. Marsden (SC) USN (ret) in the book "Gemini Ship," published 2002 by Infinity Press.

Doyen was laid up in the National Defense Reserve Fleet until transferred to the Massachusetts Maritime Academy in 1959, which renamed her TS Bay State II. Sold for scrapping on 23 January 1973, to Union Minerals & Alloys Corp, she was returned to the Maritime Administration in January 1974 for disposal.

== Awards ==
Doyen received six battle stars for World War II service.
