= USS Doyen (DD-280) =

Clemson-class destroyer

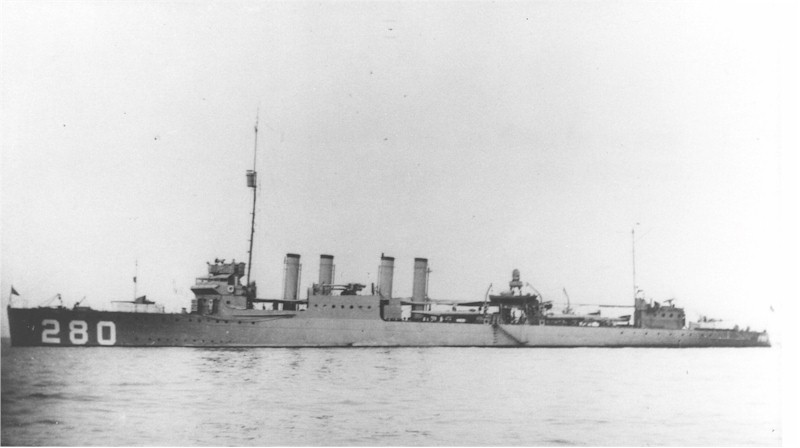

History

United States
- Name: USS Doyen
- Namesake: Charles A. Doyen
- Builder: Bethlehem Shipbuilding Corporation, Squantum Victory Yard
- Laid down: 24 March 1919
- Launched: 26 July 1919
- Commissioned: 17 December 1919
- Decommissioned: 25 February 1930
- Stricken: 12 July 1930
- Fate: Sold for scrap, 20 December 1930

General characteristics
- Class & type: Clemson-class destroyer
- Displacement: 1,290 long tons (1,311 t) (standard); 1,389 long tons (1,411 t) (deep load)
- Length: 314 ft 4 in (95.8 m)
- Beam: 30 ft 11 in (9.42 m)
- Draught: 10 ft 3 in (3.1 m)
- Installed power: 27,000 shp (20,000 kW); 4 water-tube boilers
- Propulsion: 2 shafts, 2 steam turbines
- Speed: 35 knots (65 km/h; 40 mph) (design)
- Range: 2,500 nautical miles (4,600 km; 2,900 mi) at 20 knots (37 km/h; 23 mph) (design)
- Complement: 6 officers, 108 enlisted men
- Armament: 4 × single 4-inch (102 mm) guns; 2 × single 1-pounder AA guns or; 2 × single 3-inch (76 mm) guns; 4 × triple 21 inch (533 mm) torpedo tubes; 2 × depth charge rails

USS Doyen (DD-280) was a Clemson-class destroyer built for the United States Navy during World War I.

== Description ==
The Clemson class was a repeat of the preceding Wickes class although more fuel capacity was added. The ships displaced 1,290 long tons (1,311 t) at standard load and 1,389 long tons (1,411 t) at deep load. They had an overall length of 314 feet 4 inches (95.8 m), a beam of 30 feet 11 inches (9.4 m) and a draught of 10 feet 3 inches (3.1 m). They had a crew of 6 officers and 108 enlisted men.

Performance differed radically between the ships of the class, often due to poor workmanship. The Clemson class was powered by two steam turbines, each driving one propeller shaft, using steam provided by four water-tube boilers. The turbines were designed to produce a total of 27,000 shaft horsepower (20,000 kW) intended to reach a speed of 35 knots (65 km/h; 40 mph). The ships carried a maximum of 371 long tons (377 t) of fuel oil which was intended gave them a range of 2,500 nautical miles (4,600 km; 2,900 mi) at 20 knots (37 km/h; 23 mph).

The ships were armed with four 4-inch (102 mm) guns in single mounts and were fitted with two 1-pounder guns for anti-aircraft defense. In many ships a shortage of 1-pounders caused them to be replaced by 3-inch (76 mm) guns. Their primary weapon, though, was their torpedo battery of a dozen 21 inch (533 mm) torpedo tubes in four triple mounts. They also carried a pair of depth charge rails. A "Y-gun" depth charge thrower was added to many ships.

== Construction and career ==
Doyen, named for Charles A. Doyen, was launched 26 July 1919 by Bethlehem Shipbuilding Corporation, Squantum, Massachusetts; sponsored by Miss F. E. Doyen, daughter of Brigadier General Doyen; and commissioned 17 December 1919. Doyen arrived at San Diego, California 15 March 1920 to join the Pacific Fleet in local operations. Placed in active reserve status 17 August, she participated in local exercises and reserve training until placed out of commission 8 June 1922.

Doyen was recommissioned 26 September 1923 and resumed a schedule of training and tactical exercises along the west coast, in the Panama Canal Zone, and the Hawaiian Islands. She sailed from San Diego 20 August to escort the Japanese ship Tama and to provide radio compass and communication for a nonstop west coast-to-Hawaii flight. Exercises were again conducted in the Canal Zone and the Caribbean in 1926, and later that year Doyen cruised to Bremerton, Washington for overhaul and to Ketchikan, Alaska, and Duncan Bay, British Columbia, for visits.

Doyen sailed 26 April 1927 for the east coast to participate in joint Army-Navy maneuvers at Newport, Rhode Island. She returned to the west coast 25 June and resumed training operations and tactical exercises with the Battle Fleet on the west coast, out of Pearl Harbor and in the Canal Zone. Doyen was decommissioned 25 February 1930 and scrapped 20 December 1930 in accordance with the London Naval Treaty for the limitation of naval armaments.
