= USS Shelby =

United States Naval Vessel

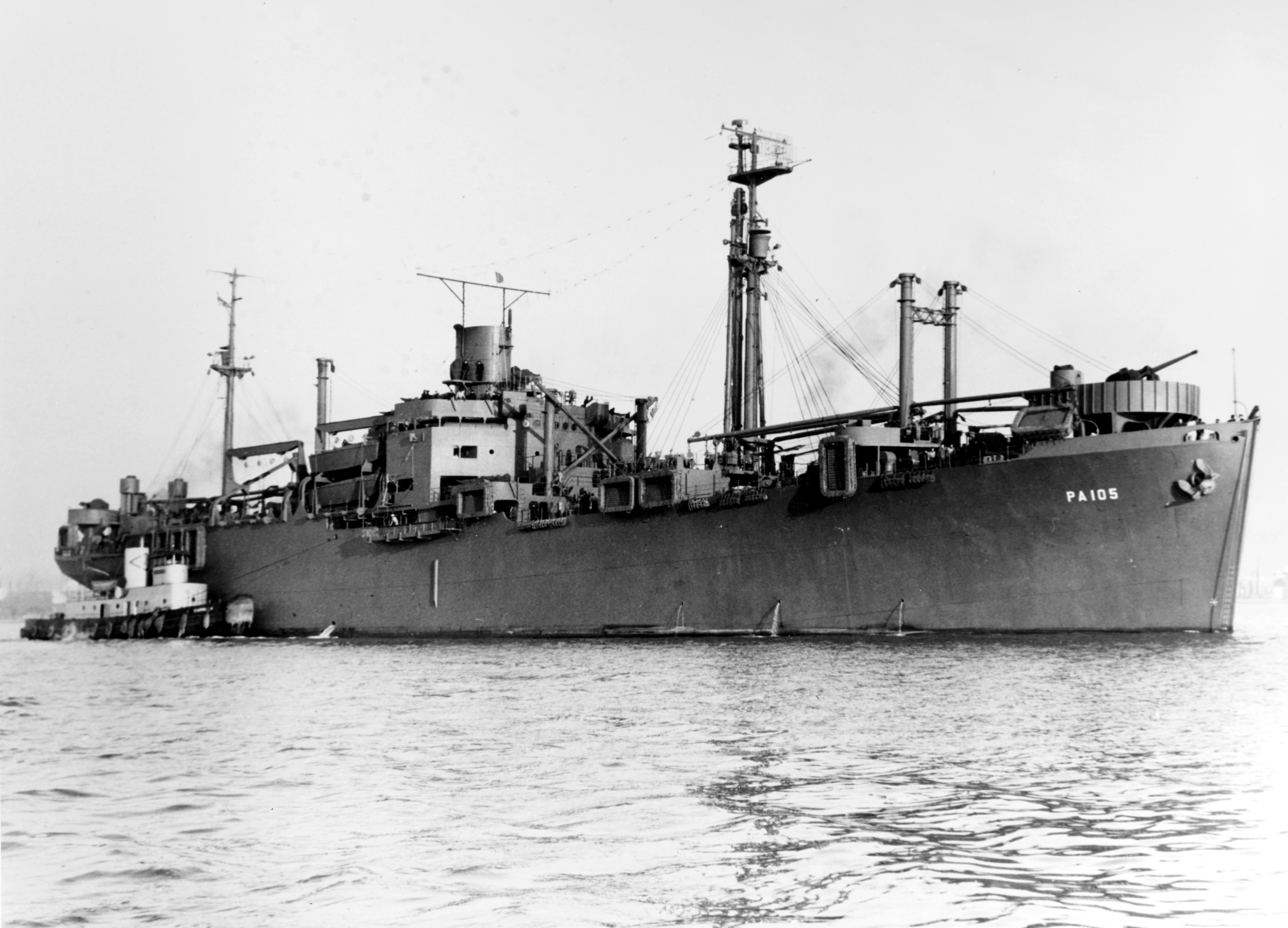

History

United States
- Name: USS Shelby (APA-105)
- Namesake: Shelby County, Alabama; Shelby County, Illinois; Shelby County, Indiana; Shelby County, Iowa; Shelby County, Kentucky; Shelby County, Missouri; Shelby County, Ohio; Shelby County, Tennessee; Shelby County, Texas
- Builder: Bethlehem Steel
- Laid down: 13 June 1944
- Launched: 25 October 1944
- Sponsored by: Mrs B. Barrett Griggith
- Commissioned: 20 January 1945
- Decommissioned: 14 May 1946
- Stricken: 5 June 1946
- Honours and awards: One battle star for World War II service
- Fate: Scrapped 1974

General characteristics
- Class & type: Windsor-class attack transport
- Displacement: 7,970 tons (lt), 13,143 t. (fl)
- Length: 473 ft 1 in
- Beam: 66 ft
- Draft: 25 ft
- Propulsion: Bethlehem geared turbine drive, 2 × Babcock & Wilcox header-type boilers, single propeller, designed shaft horsepower 8,000
- Speed: 18.6 knots (34.4 km)
- Capacity: Troops: Officer 94 Enlisted 1,463; Cargo: 150,000 cu ft, 1,600 tons
- Complement: Officer 42 Enlisted 434
- Armament: 1 x 5"/38 caliber dual-purpose gun mounts, 2 x Bofors 40mm gun mounts, 2 x twin 20mm gun mounts, 18 x single 20mm gun mounts
- Notes: MCV Hull No. 1678, hull type C3-S-A3

USS Shelby (APA-105) was a Windsor-class attack transport that served with the US Navy during World War II. She was commissioned late in the war and initially assigned to transport duties; consequently she did not take part in any combat operations.

Shelby was named after counties in nine US states. She was laid down on 13 June 1944 under Maritime Commission contract by the Bethlehem Sparrows Point Shipyard, Sparrows Point, Maryland; launched on 25 October 1944; and commissioned on 20 January 1945.

== World War II ==
Shelby underwent shakedown in Chesapeake Bay, and then reported to Davisville, Rhode Island, to embark 1,356 Seabees. Sailing on 24 February, she delivered the men to Pearl Harbor on 17 March.

=== Invasion of Okinawa ===
At Pearl, she loaded combat medical supplies and 1,383 troops, and sailed on 7 April. Stopping at Eniwetok from 15 to 23 April and at Ulithi from 27 to 29 April, Shelby arrived at Okinawa and disembarked her troops on 3 and 4 May.

The ships there underwent frequent air attacks, and, on 4 May, a kamikaze aircraft passed over Shelby and crashed into the light cruiser USS Birmingham (CL-62) anchored nearby. The same day, Shelby began receiving casualties from the beach, although cargo unloading continued until 6 May. On 8 May, she got underway with 166 wounded servicemen on board, whom she disembarked at Saipan on 12 May before returning to San Francisco on 28 May.

On 13 June, Shelby sailed from San Francisco with troops and cargo for Manila, where she arrived on 8 July after stops at Eniwetok and Ulithi. She then returned, via the same route, to San Francisco on 5 August; and, after 10 days repairs, moved to San Diego to load more cargo and passengers.

=== After hostilities ===
Sailing on 20 August, Shelby arrived at Pearl Harbor on 26 August and sailed from there on 1 September with troops and equipment for the occupation of Japan. The transport entered Sasebo, Japan, on 22 September; and, after disembarking her troops, departed on 25 September to pick up additional occupation forces in the Philippines. She embarked these in Lingayen Gulf between 3 and 5 October and delivered them at Sasebo on 14 October.

==== Operation Magic Carpet ====
Embarking some marine units there, she sailed from Sasebo on 21 October and arrived at Saipan on 6 November. At Saipan, Shelby reported for duty with Operation Magic Carpet, and she sailed on 7 November loaded with homeward-bound servicemen. Disembarking these at Los Angeles on 21 November, she underwent repairs before sailing from San Pedro on 13 December on her second "Magic Carpet" run.

She embarked troops at Manila between 2 and 4 January 1946, and returned them to Seattle on 23 January. A month later, she sailed for the east coast, arriving at Norfolk, Virginia on 14 March for inactivation.

=== Decommission ===
Shelby was decommissioned on 14 May 1946, delivered to the War Shipping Administration on 16 May and struck from the Navy List on 5 June 1946.

=== Service stars ===
Shelby received one battle star for her World War II service.

== Commercial service ==
Shelby was sold to American Export Lines in 1948, which renamed her Exeter. She was sold again on 24 September 1965, renamed Oriental Pearl, and re-flagged in Liberia. She was scrapped in 1974.
