= USS Dutchess =

United States Navy transport vessel

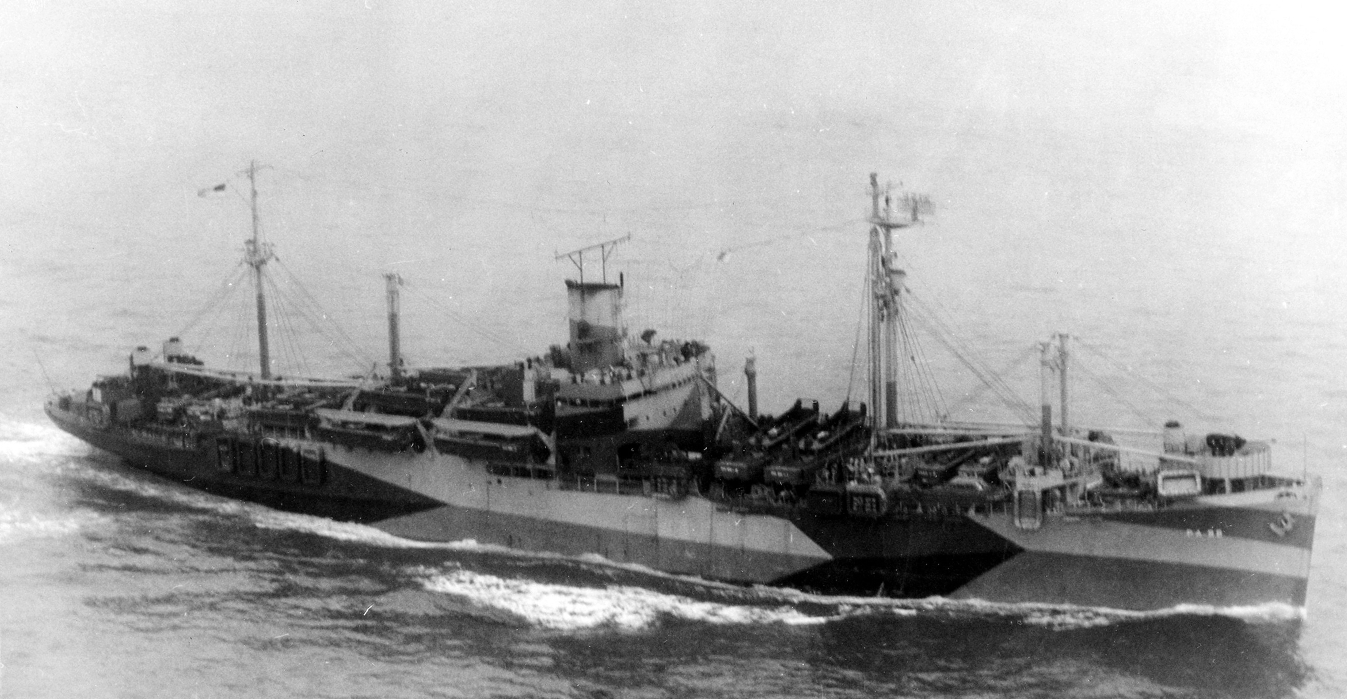
- Dutchess in December 1944

History

United States
- Name: USS Dutchess (APA-98)
- Namesake: Dutchess County, New York
- Builder: Bethlehem Steel
- Launched: 26 August 1944
- Sponsored by: Miss Dorothy Unger
- Christened: Dutchess
- Acquired: 4 November 1944
- Commissioned: 4 November 1944
- Decommissioned: 4 April 1946
- Renamed: Excalibur, Oriental Jade
- Honours and awards: One battle star for World War II service
- Fate: Scrapped, 1974

General characteristics
- Class & type: Windsor-class attack transport
- Displacement: 7,970 tons (lt), 13,143 t. (fl)
- Length: 473 ft 1 in
- Beam: 66 ft
- Draft: 25 ft
- Propulsion: Bethlehem geared turbine drive, 2 × Babcock & Wilcox header-type boilers, single propeller, designed shaft horsepower 8,000
- Speed: 18.6 knots
- Capacity: Troops: Officer 94 Enlisted 1,463; Cargo: 150,000 cu ft, 1,600 tons
- Complement: Officer 42 Enlisted 434
- Armament: 1 x 5"/38 caliber dual-purpose gun mounts, 2 x Bofors 40mm gun mounts, 2 x twin 20mm gun mounts, 18 x single 20mm gun mounts
- Notes: MCV Hull No. 1676, hull type C3-S-A1

USS Dutchess (APA-98) was a Windsor-class attack transport that served with the United States Navy from 1944 to 1946. She was subsequently sold into commercial service and was scrapped in 1974.

== History ==
Dutchess was named after a county in New York State. She was launched 26 August 1944 by Bethlehem Sparrow's Point Shipyard, Sparrow's Point, Maryland, under a United States Maritime Commission contract; transferred to the Navy 4 November 1944; and commissioned the same day. Arriving at Newport, Rhode Island, 8 December 1944, Dutchess served as schoolship for precommissioning crews until 27 February 1945 when she got underway from Davisville, Rhode Island, for the Pacific.

=== Pacific War ===
She reached Pearl Harbor 19 March for training exercises, then sailed by way of Eniwetok to Okinawa where she landed reinforcements and combat cargo on 1 May. A week later she sailed for Saipan to debark casualties, and continued to San Francisco, arriving 29 May.

Dutchess sailed from Portland, Oregon, 13 June 1945 with troops for Pearl Harbor, then transported men of the IXth Corps, U.S. Army, to San Pedro, Leyte, arriving 15 July. She voyaged to carry troops from San Francisco to Manila between 21 July and 12 September, then sailed in the Philippines in local redeployment of troops. Left San Francisco, 1530, Tuesday, 31 August 1945. Crossed International Date line Wednesday night and had Friday next day, 31 August. Name of ship is U.S.S. Duchess or PA-98. First stop at Marshall, 3 September, at 11 o’clock. Left 2:30 that afternoon arrived Carolinas, 7 September, in morning. Left 8 September. Arrived at Manila Bay 12 September at quarter past nine.

==== Operation Magic Carpet ====
Dutchess arrived at Wakayama, Japan, 7 October 1945, and landed occupation troops at Nagoya on the 26th and 27th. She was assigned to Operation Magic Carpet and sailed from Nagoya 1 November to embark returning servicemen at Manila and carry them to San Francisco arriving 25 November. A similar voyage was made between 8 December 1945 and 25 January 1946.

=== Decommissioning ===
Dutchess left San Francisco 1 February for the East Coast, arriving at Norfolk 19 February. She was decommissioned there 4 April 1946 and delivered to the War Shipping Administration the next day for disposal.

=== Commercial service ===
In 1948, Dutchess was sold to American Export-Isbrandtsen Lines and renamed Excalibur. She was later resold to C. Y. Tung of Hong Kong, reflagged in the Republic of China, and renamed Oriental Jade. She was scrapped in 1974.

== Awards ==
Dutchess received one battle star for World War II service.
