= Doyen-class attack transport =

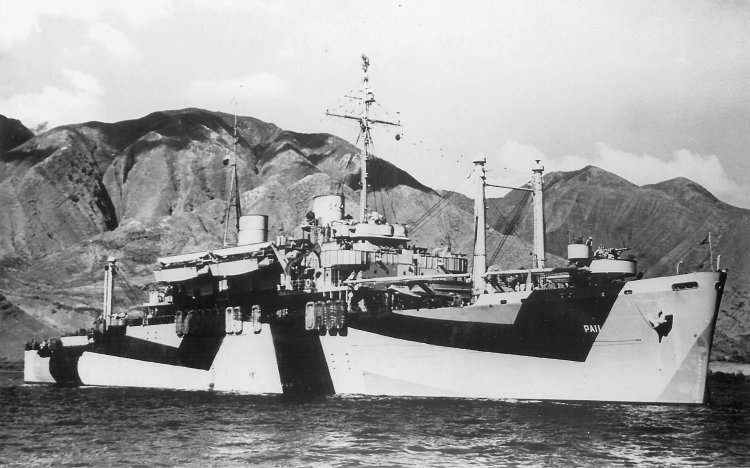
- USS Feland (APA-11), a ship of the Doyen class

Class overview
- Name: Doyen-class
- Builders: Consolidated Steel
- Operators: United States Navy
- Preceded by: Frederick Funston class
- Succeeded by: Windsor class
- Built: 1942 – June 1943
- In commission: 22 May 1943 – 20 March 1946
- Completed: 2
- Retired: 2

General characteristics
- Type: MCV hull type P1-S2-L2
- Displacement: 4,351 tons (lt), 6,720 tons (fl)
- Length: 414 ft 6 in (126.34 m)
- Beam: 56 ft (17 m)
- Draft: 19 ft (5.8 m)
- Propulsion: Geared turbine drive, twin screws, 8,000-8,800 horsepower
- Speed: 19 knots (35 km/h; 22 mph)
- Capacity: Troops: 1,100
- Complement: 453
- Armament: 4 × 3"/50 caliber dual-purpose guns, variable secondary

The Doyen-class attack transport was a class of two attack transports that saw service with the US Navy in World War II. Ships of the class were named after generals of the United States Marine Corps.

Like all attack transports, the purpose of the Doyen class was to transport troops and their equipment to hostile shores in order to execute amphibious invasions. To perform this task, attack transports were equipped with a substantial number of integral landing craft, and heavily armed with antiaircraft weaponry to protect themselves and their vulnerable cargo of troops from air attack in the battle zone.

== Background ==
There were only two ships of the Doyen class. They were based on the Maritime Commission's P1 hull type, specifically the P1-S2-L2 type. Both were built by the Consolidated Steel Corporation of Los Angeles, California.

Laid down as part of the Navy's 1940 fiscal program, they were each designed to carry a battalion of the Marine Expeditionary Force which was maintained on both coasts of the United States in peacetime. The lead ship, Doyen, was launched in July 1942 while her sister ship Feland was not launched until the following November, but Feland was first to be commissioned, on 22 May 1943, about a month before Doyen. Both ships were reclassified from transports (AP) to attack transports (APA) while still dockside, in February 1943.

== Description ==
The Doyen-class ships, at only 414 feet in length and with a displacement of 4,351 tons (standard), were considerably smaller than most other classes of attack transport. However, it appears their troop carrying capacity was adequate, with Feland listed as able to carry 1,100 troops. Three different sources suggest a deadweight tonnage of 2,150 tons, a design specification calling for a cargo volume of 75,000 cubic feet, and an actual non-refrigerated cargo volume of 90,000 cubic feet.

The Doyens were also slightly faster than most other classes of attack transport, listed as having a top speed of 19 knots compared to the 16–18 knots of other classes. Like most of the early classes of attack transport, their main armament was four 3"/50 caliber guns, later classes would be fitted with either one or two 5" guns and considerably more 40mm weapons.

The profile of the ships is somewhat unusual, as the aft funnel was shorter than the fore one. The two masts were also unusually close together amidships, mounted on the front and rear superstructure. The main deck was cut away at quarterdeck level and fitted with a special ramp aft for the launching of landing craft or the offloading of tanks and other heavy equipment.

As the vessels approached completion it was noted that they were nearly 500 tons overweight, drew 3 feet more than designed, and suffered from "dubious stability." Some steps were taken to mitigate these issues, but they were noted as heeling excessively throughout their careers.

== In service ==
Both vessels served exclusively in the Pacific Theatre, often on the same missions. The two saw action together at Tarawa, Saipan, Guam, Luzon and Iwo Jima. Doyen, however, saw additional action at Kiska in the Aleutians and at Kwajalein and earned six battle stars to Feland's five.

Both returned to the United States shortly before the end of the war for overhaul, after which they each made one more journey to the Pacific, Doyen on a Magic Carpet mission, and Feland on a cargo mission. Like most other attack transports, they were then decommissioned in March 1946 and laid up in the National Defense Reserve Fleet.

Feland was eventually scrapped in 1964, but in 1959 Doyen received a new lease of life as TS Bay State, a training ship with the Massachusetts Maritime Academy. She was returned to the Maritime Commission in January 1974 and resold.
