= Charles A. Doyen =

United States Marine Corps general

Charles Augustus Doyen
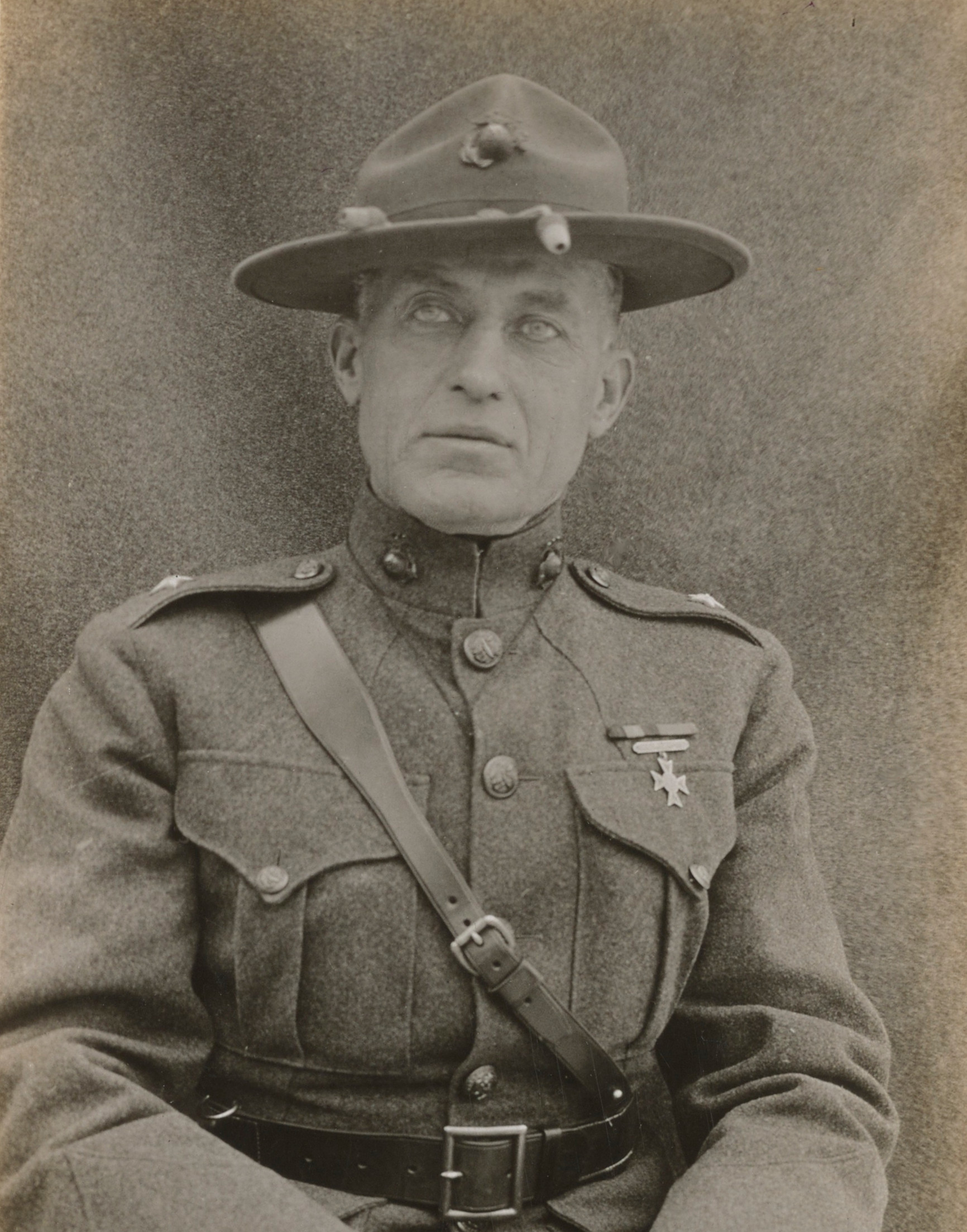
- Born: September 3, 1859; Concord, New Hampshire, United States
- Died: October 6, 1918 (aged 59); Quantico, Virginia, United States
- Burial place: Arlington National Cemetery, Virginia, United States
- Military career
- Allegiance: United States
- Branch: United States Marine Corps
- Service years: 1881–1918
- Rank: Brigadier General
- Commands: 2nd Marine Regiment; 1st Marine Brigade; 5th Marine Regiment; 4th Marine Brigade; 2nd Division
- Conflicts: Philippine–American War; World War I
- Awards: Navy Distinguished Service Medal

Brigadier General Charles Augustus Doyen (September 3, 1859 − October 6, 1918) was an officer in the United States Marine Corps (USMC). He is notable for having commanded the 4th Marine Brigade during World War I and was the first recipient of the Navy Distinguished Service Medal.

== Military career ==
Charles Augustus Doyen was born in Concord, New Hampshire, on September 3, 1859. He entered the United States Naval Academy in 1881, from where he graduated as a second lieutenant into the United States Marine Corps (USMC) in 1883. His early military career consisted mainly of tours with marine detachments aboard ship, barracks assignments and service overseas, such as in the Philippines. Here, from 1905−1906, he commanded a battalion, before going on to command the 2nd Marine Regiment, and finally the 1st Marine Brigade. He returned again to the Philippines from 1913−1914, again commanding the 1st Marine Brigade. In 1914, the year when World War I began in Europe, he was commanding the 5th Marine Regiment in Cuba and the Dominican Republic. He later commanded the Marine Barracks at Washington, D. C.

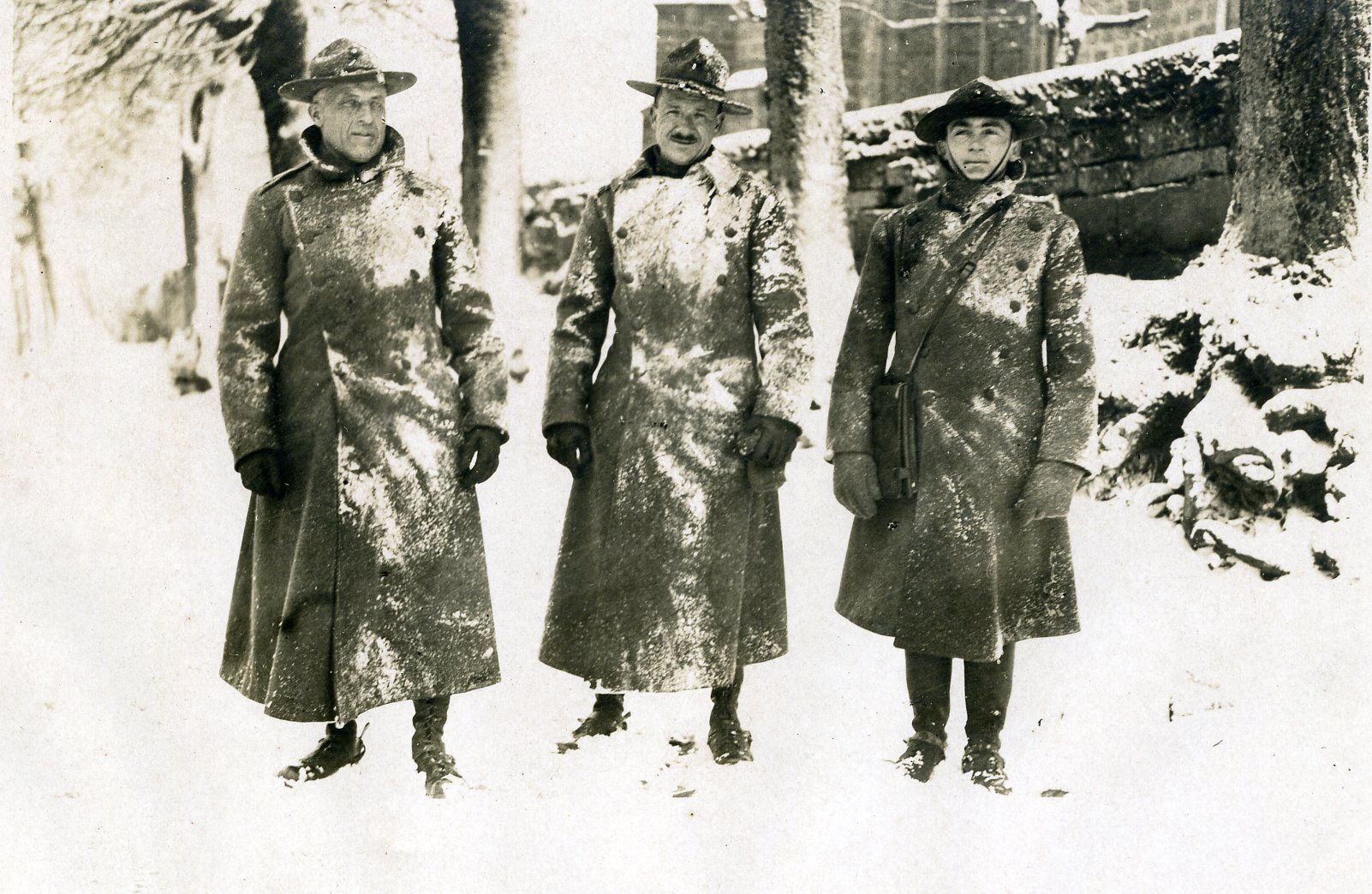
Brigadier General Charles A. Doyen, commanding the 4th Marine Brigade, and sone members of his brigade staff, at Damblain, France, February 1918. To Doyen's left is Major Holland Smith, the brigade adjutant, and Lieutenant Goodman, Doyen's aide-de-camp.

After the American entry into World War I in April 1917, Doyen had been chosen to command the 5th Marine Regiment, which had been the first unit of the USMC to be sent to France, having arrived there in June 1917, along with the first elements of the American Expeditionary Forces (AEF). Shortly afterwards, Doyen received a promotion to brigadier general. The 4th Marine Brigade was created with the arrival in France of the 6th Marine Regiment and the 6th Machine Gun Battalion, in addition to the 5th Marines, with Doyen being given command of the brigade towards the end of October 1917. The brigade eventually became part of the 2nd Division of the United States Army, which began to be formed at around the same time. A headquarters for the division began forming. Doyen, then the most senior officer present, assumed temporary command until the first week of November when Major General Omar Bundy, U.S. Army, took over, with Doyen reverting to control of the 4th Marine Brigade. Although brief, he was still the first marine officer to command a division.

The next few weeks and months were to gain Doyen a reputation as an excellent trainer of troops. Knowing what his men would face when they ultimately engaged in combat, he worked strenuously to prepare his mostly green and inexperienced men for that task. In doing so, however, his health was badly affected. He remained in command of his beloved brigade only until May 1918 when a medical board declared him to be medically unfit for any further active service abroad. Brigadier General James Harbord, U.S. Army, former chief of staff of the AEF, soon took over the brigade. The brigade soon found itself fighting at Belleau Wood and its performance there and in other battles that were yet to come were a tribute to Doyen and his efforts to prepare his marines.

Soon after his return to the United States he was placed in command of the Marine Corps Training Camp and the Marine Barracks located at Quantico, Virginia. It was here where his experience as a trainer was put to good use as he trained officers and men for overseas service. It was cut short, however, as, his health having been severely weakened by his time in France, he was struck by the Spanish influenza (or Spanish flu) which plagued the world at the time and he died of bronchial pneumonia on October 6, 1918, shortly after turning 59. He was buried in Arlington National Cemetery.

Not long after his death, the Navy Department presented Doyen's wife with the first ever Navy Distinguished Service Medal, in recognition of her husband's distinguished efforts during the war. The citation for the medal reads:

The President of the United States of America takes pride in presenting the Navy Distinguished Service Medal (Posthumously) to Brigadier General Charles Augustus Doyen, United States Marine Corps, for exceptionally meritorious and distinguished services. By reason of his abilities and personal efforts, Brigadier General Doyen brought this brigade to the very high state of efficiency which enabled it to successfully resist the German Army in the Chateau-Thierry sector and Belleau Woods. The strong efforts on his part for nearly a year, undermined his health, and necessitated his being invalided to the United States before having the opportunity to command the brigade in action, but his work was shown by the excellent service rendered by the brigade, not only at Belleau Woods, but during the entire campaign when they fought in many battles.

== Namesake ==
Two ships have been named USS Doyen for him.

== Sources ==
- Venzon, Anne Cipriano (2013). The United States in the First World War: an Encyclopedia. Hoboken, NJ: Taylor and Francis. ISBN 978-1-135-68453-2. OCLC 865332376.
- "Doyen". Dictionary of American Naval Fighting Ships. Naval History & Heritage Command, Department of the Navy. Archived from the original on March 2, 2004.
- United States Army records of World War I
- Bastedo, Russell (2007). "General Charles Augustus Doyen". Publications - Likenesses of New Hampshire War Heroes & Personages in the Collections of the New Hampshire State House & State Library. New Hampshire State Curator.
