= Operation Flintlock naval order of battle =

Order of battle for World War II battle

Map of the Marshall Islands and a detailed map of Kwajalein Atoll

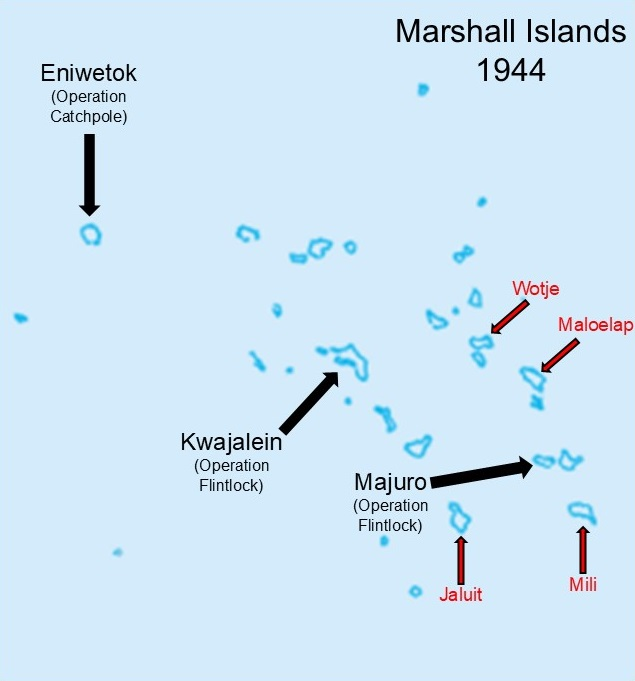
Sites of US conquest are indicated in black; Japanese-held atolls indicated in red were bypassed.

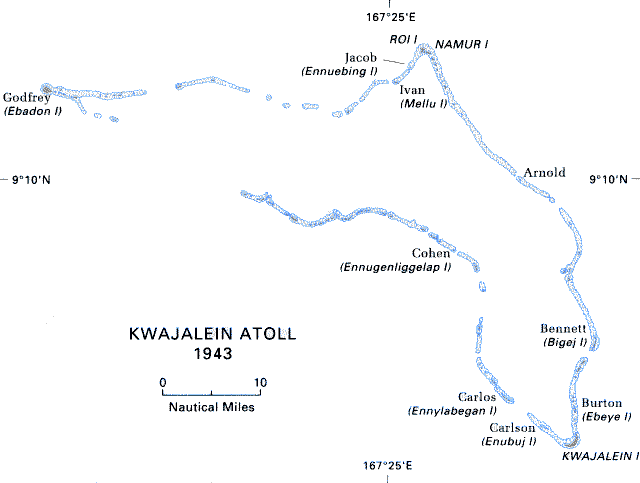
Roi-Namur is in the upper right corner, Kwajalein Island in the bottom corner; islands are designated with US codenames with native names in parentheses.

Naval commanders

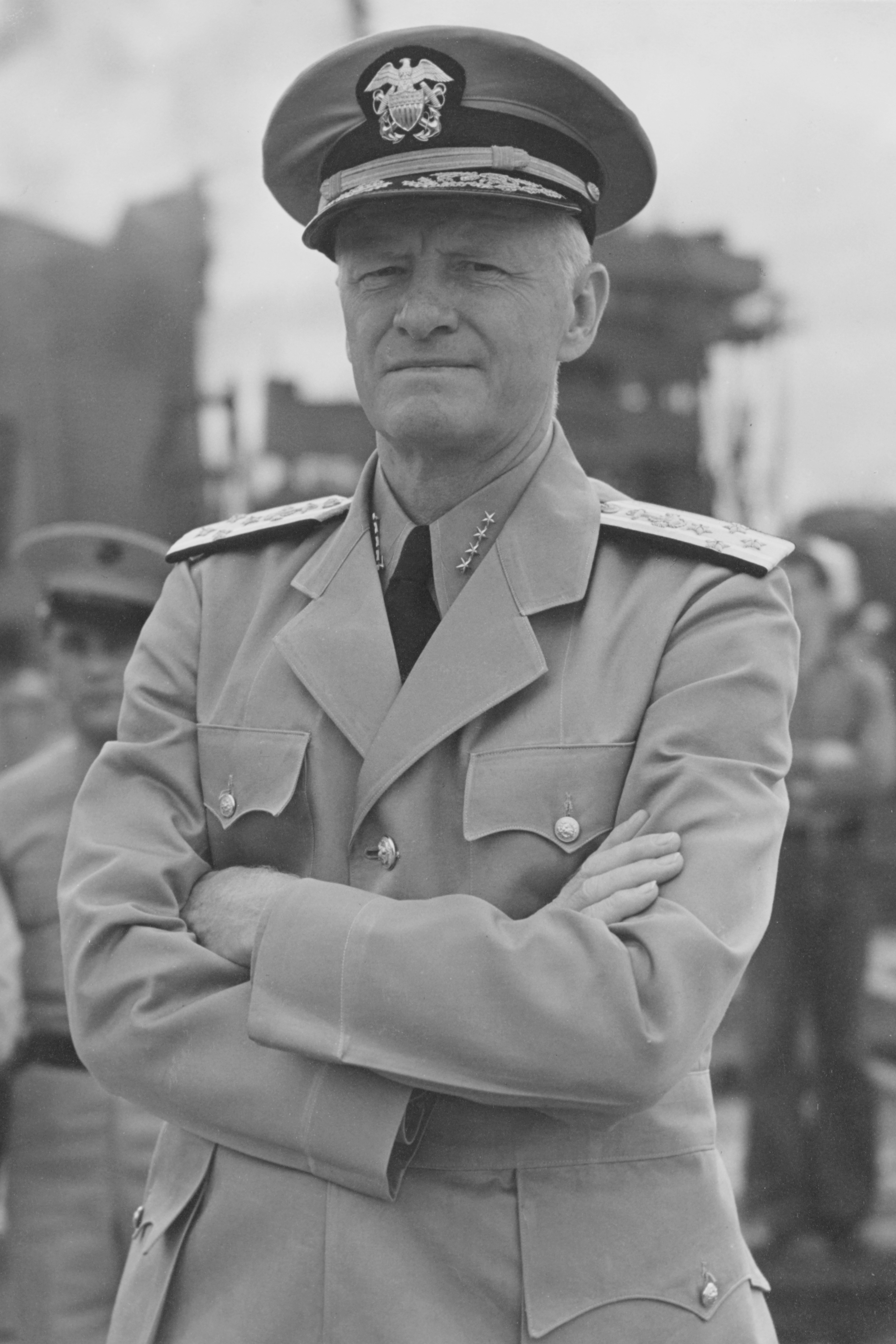
Adm. Chester W. Nimitz

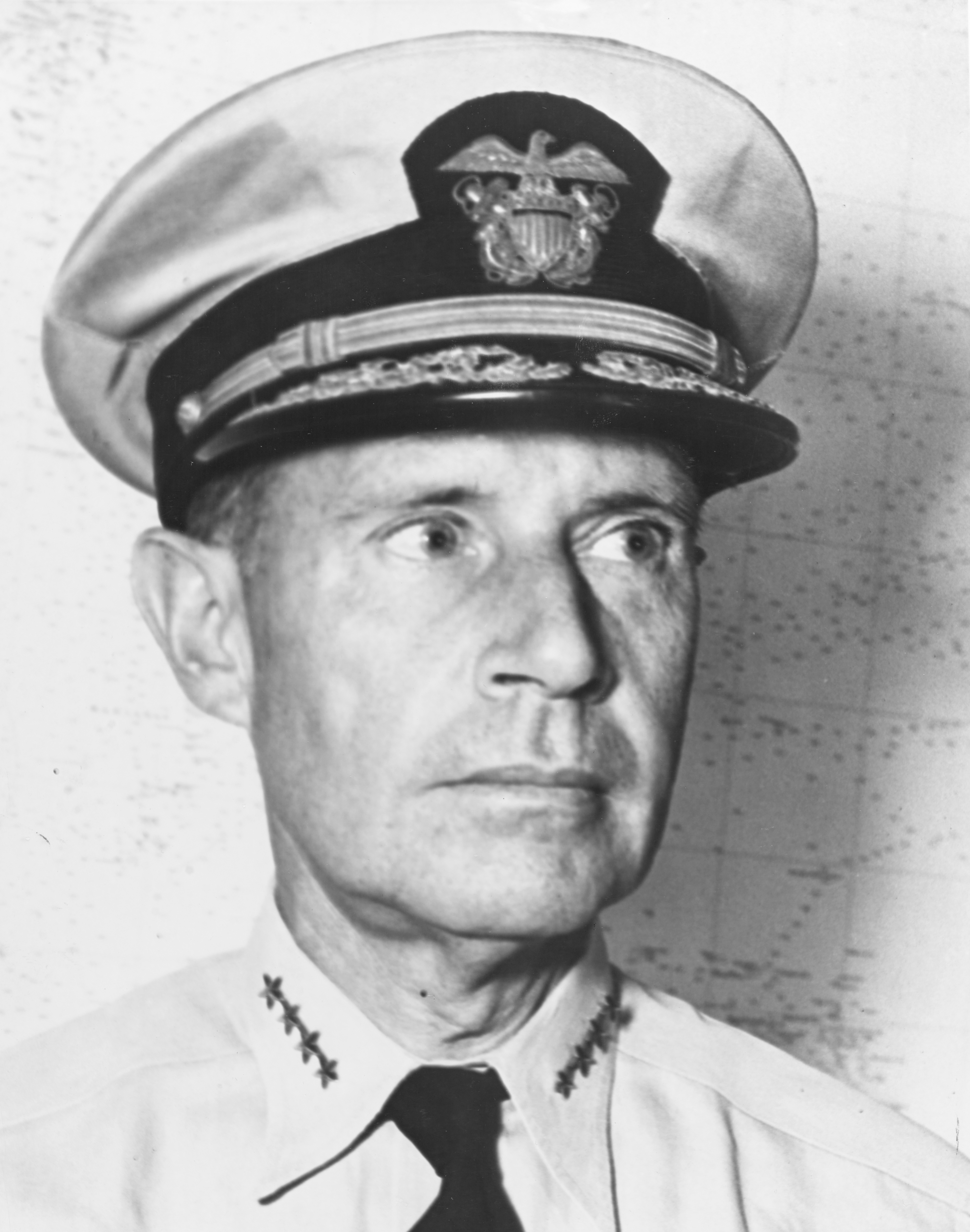
Raymond A. Spruance as a full admiral

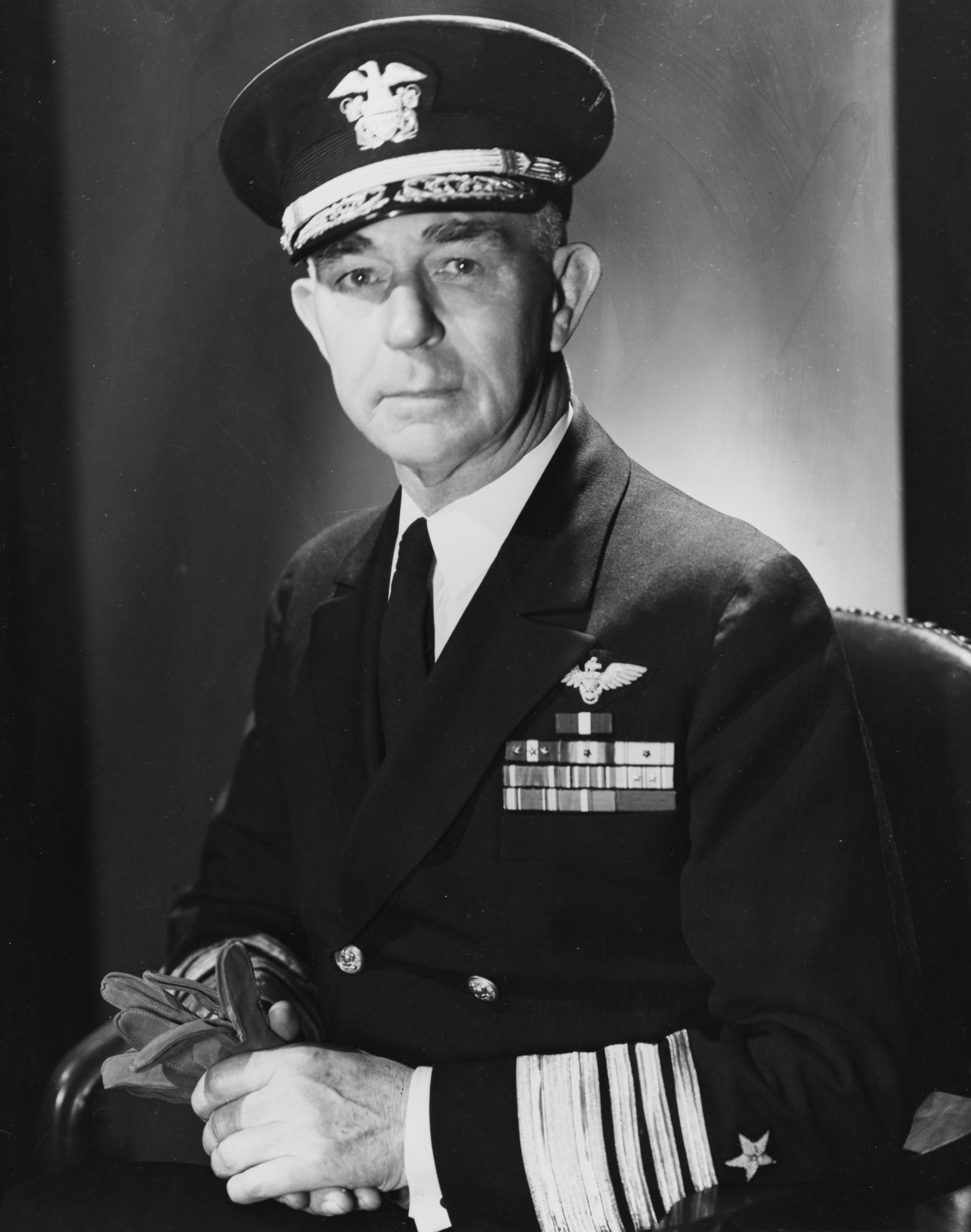
Richmond Kelly Turner as a full admiral

Ground force commanders

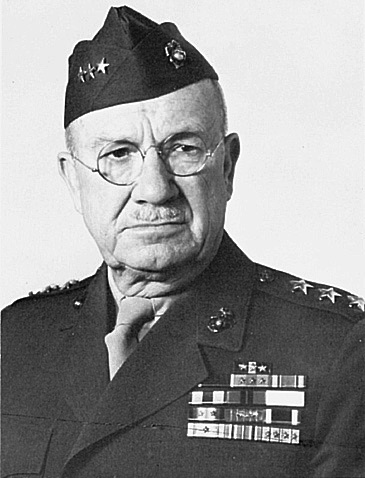
Lieut. Gen. Holland M. Smith, USMC

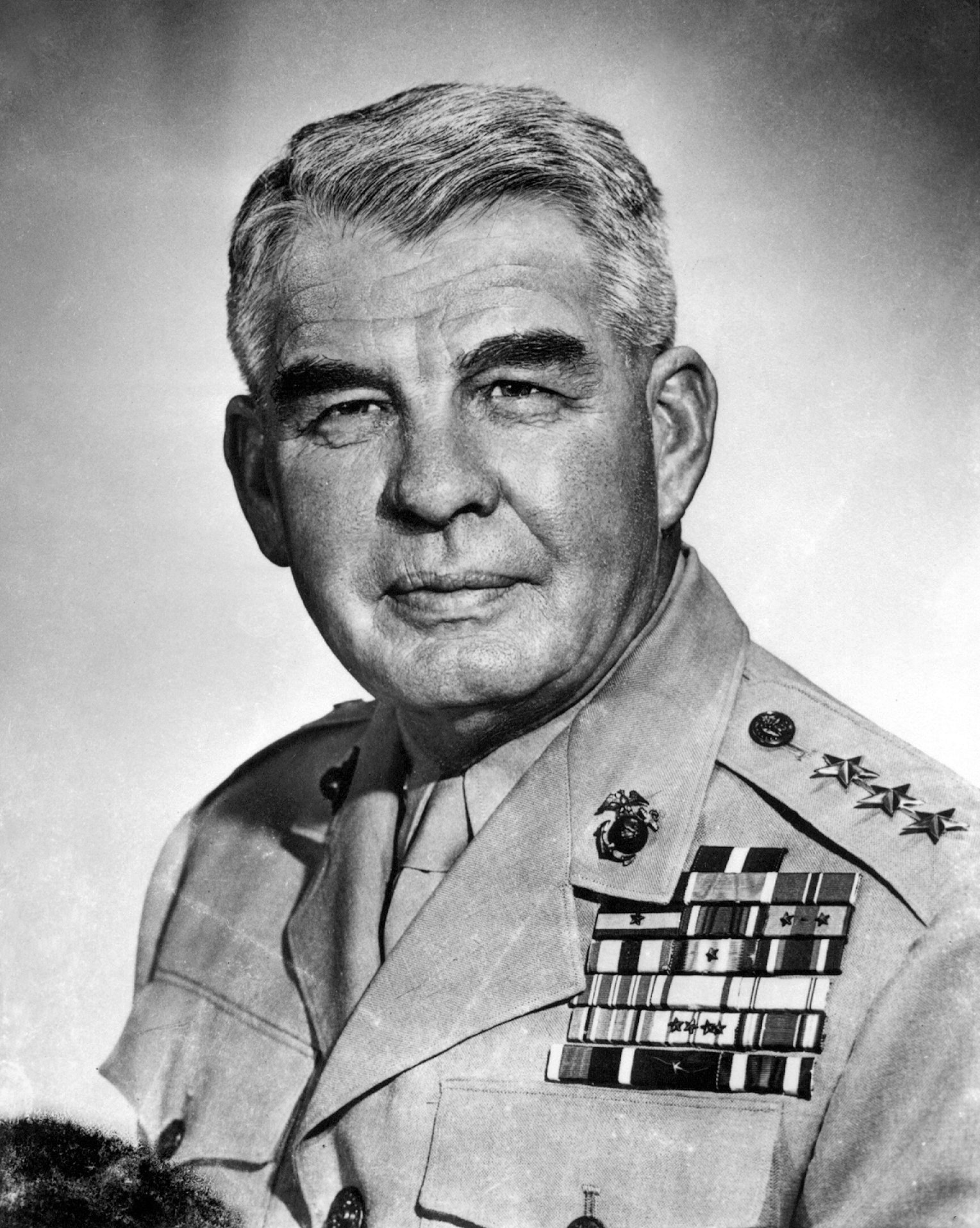
Harry Schmidt, USMC, as a lieut. general

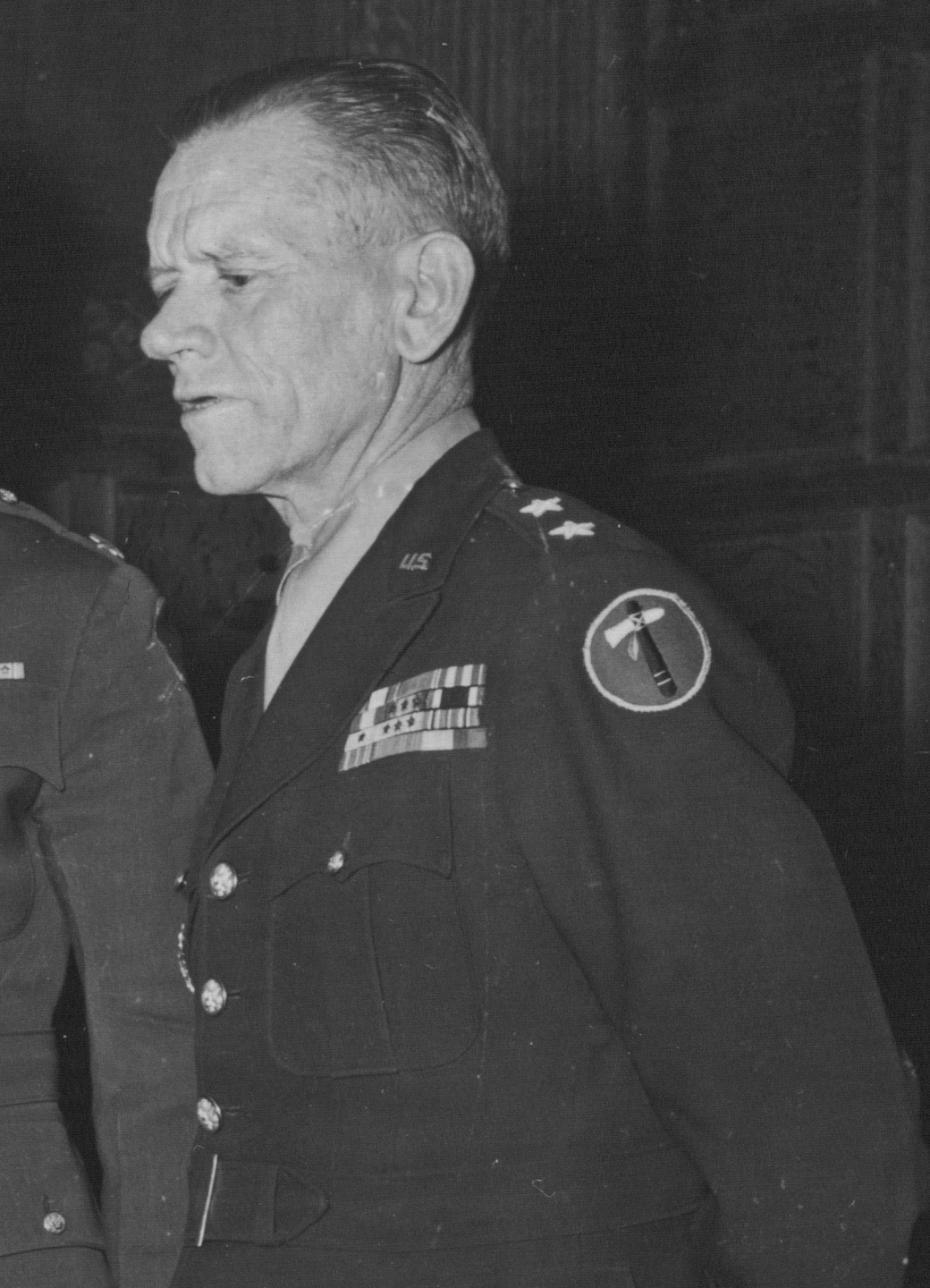
Maj. Gen. Charles H. Corlett, USA

This is the order of battle of the US naval forces deployed for Operation Flintlock, a phase of the Pacific Theatre of World War II. Flintlock consisted of simultaneous landings by men of the United States Marine Corps and United States Army at Majuro Atoll and Kwajalein Atoll, both located in the Marshall Islands in the Central Pacific, on 31 January 1944.

Forces of Imperial Japan held several sites in the Marshalls.

- Majuro Atoll was targeted by US planners because it would provide an excellent fleet anchorage; its capture was the responsibility of the 2nd Battalion (reinf.) of the US Army's 106th Infantry Regiment plus a reconnaissance company of Marines. Because the Japanese had abandoned it over a year earlier, the atoll was declared secure at 0950 hours on D-Day.
- The Japanese command considered Kwajalein Atoll, unlike Majuro, to be vital to the defense of the Marshalls. (Note: "That atoll was the hub of the enemy's outer defensive perimeter and the distributing center for his Marshall Islands spider's web.") and had heavily fortified both of its major islands.

Kwajalein is shaped roughly like a boomerang.
- Capture of the connected islands of Roi-Namur, located in the northeast corner of the atoll, was the responsibility of the 4th Marine Division. Roi was declared secure at 1802 hours on D+1, Namur at 1418 hours on D+2.
- Kwajalein Island is located at the south corner of the atoll; its capture was assigned to the US Army's 7th Infantry Division. The island was declared secure at 1618 hours on D+4.

- Eniwetok Atoll, being the furthest to the northwest, lay astride the air supply route for the Japanese, making it another objective for US planners. It was captured as the result of Operation Catchpole in February.

Four other atolls held by the Japanese in the Marshalls (Wotje, Maloelap, Mili and Jaluit) all contained a seaplane base, an airfield or both. These sites were simply bypassed as part of the US "island-hopping" strategy.

== Naval command ==
The roles of Commander in Chief, Pacific Ocean Areas (CINCPOA) and Commander in Chief, U.S. Pacific Fleet (CINCPAC), were both exercised by Admiral Chester W. Nimitz from his headquarters at Pearl Harbor, Hawaii.

Since the Marshalls lie in the Central Pacific, their capture was the responsibility of the U.S. Fifth Fleet, led by Vice Admiral Raymond A. Spruance from aboard his flagship, heavy cruiser Indianapolis.

The ships and troops of Operations Flintlock were under direct operational command of Rear Admiral Richmond Kelly Turner aboard amphibious command ship Rocky Mount.

Since the Japanese Combined Fleet had stripped most of its air power to defend the base at Rabaul, Admiral Mineichi Koga chose not to challenge the American operations in the Marshalls.

== Ground troops ==
V Amphibious Corps (Lieut. Gen. Holland M. Smith), USMC

Roi-Namur Islands

4th Marine Division (Maj. Gen. Harry Schmidt, USMC)
24,902 officers and enlisted

Kwajalein Island

7th Infantry Division (Maj. Gen. Charles H. Corlett, USA)
21,768 officers and enlisted

== Forces afloat ==
=== Task Force 51 – Joint Expeditionary Force ===
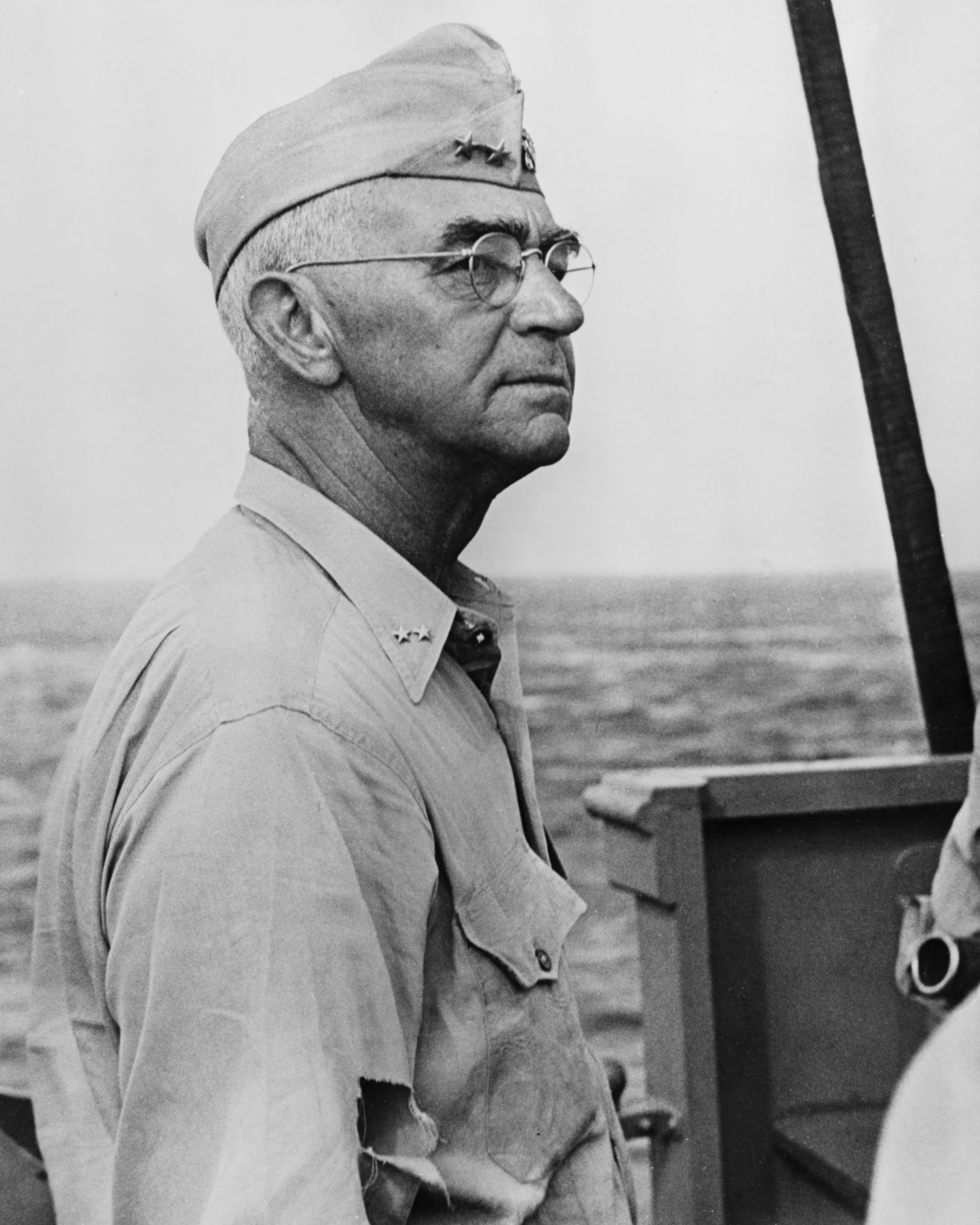
Richmond Kelly Turner

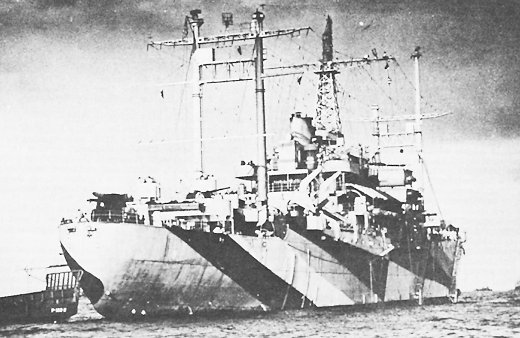
Rear Adm. Turner's flagship Rocky Mount

Rear Admiral Richmond Kelly Turner in amphibious command ship Rocky Mount

TG 51.3 – Southern Defense Group
Cmdr. W.J. Whiteside

4 landing ship, tank: LST-23, LST-227, LST-244, LST-484

Embarking elements of the 3rd and 4th Army Defense Battalions and other troops

1 destroyer escort

Evarts-class (3 × 3-in. main battery): Duffy

TG 51.4 – Southern Garrison Group
Capt. H.O. Roesch

5 transports

SS Cape Fear, SS Cape Isabel, SS Cape Stevens, SS Island Mail, SS Monarch of the Seas

Embarking elements of the 3rd and 4th Army Defense Battalions and other troops

2 destroyer escorts

Both Evarts-class (3 × 3-in. main battery): Burden R. Hastings, LeHardy

TG 51.5 – Northern Defense Group
Lt. Cmdr. R.V. Wheeler

4 landing ship, tank: LST-241, LST-268, LST-476, LST-477, LST-479

Embarking elements of the 15th Marine Defense Battalion and other troops

1 fast minesweeper

ex-Clemson-class destroyer: Long

TG 51.6 – Northern Garrison Group
Capt. P.P. Blackburn

5 transports

SS Cape Georgia, SS Cape San Martin, SS Robin Wentley, SS Young America

Embarking elements of the 15th Marine Defense Battalion and other troops

2 destroyer escorts

Both Evarts-class (3 × 3-in. main battery): Harold C. Thomas, Wileman

=== Task Force 52 – Southern Attack Force ===
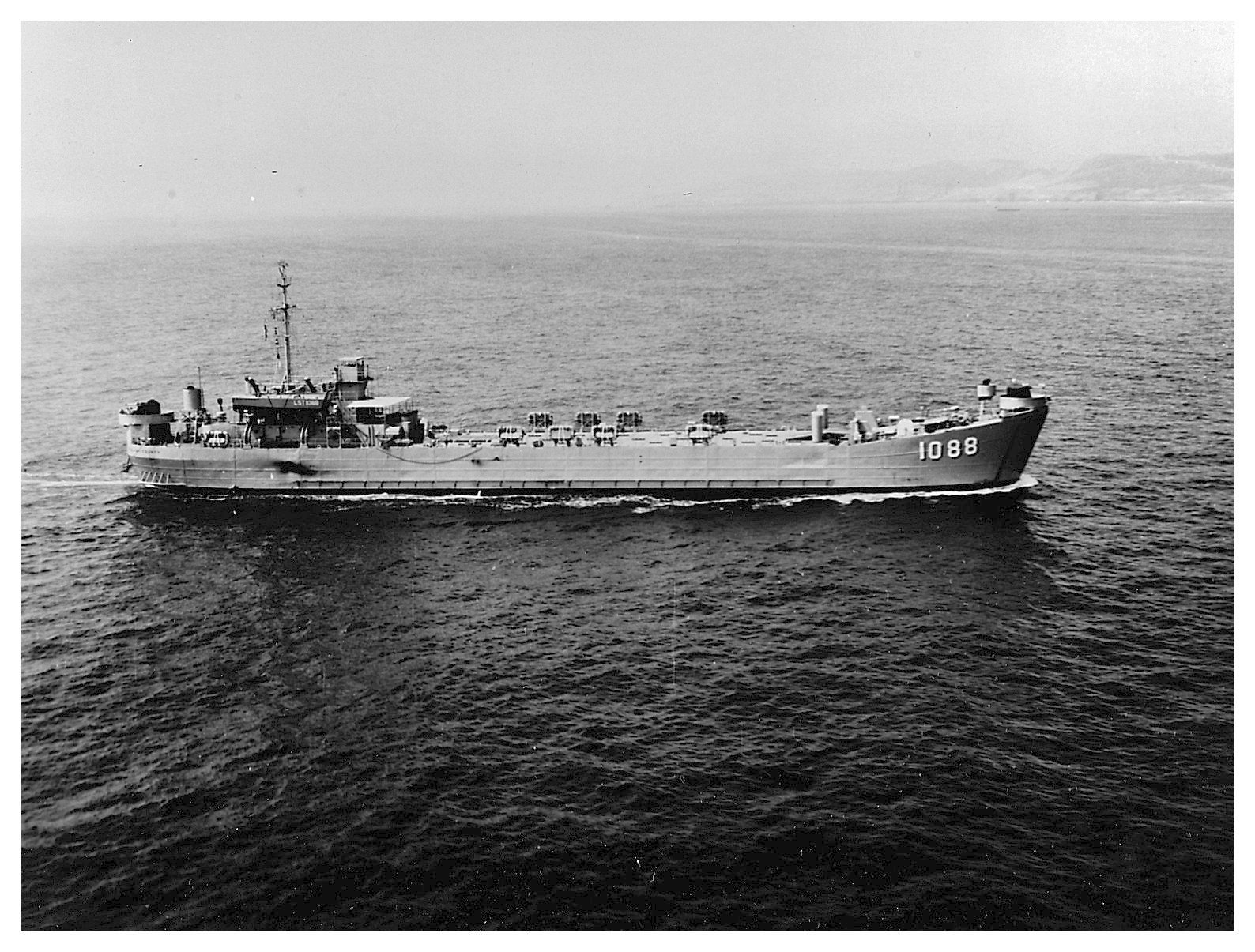
Landing ship tank

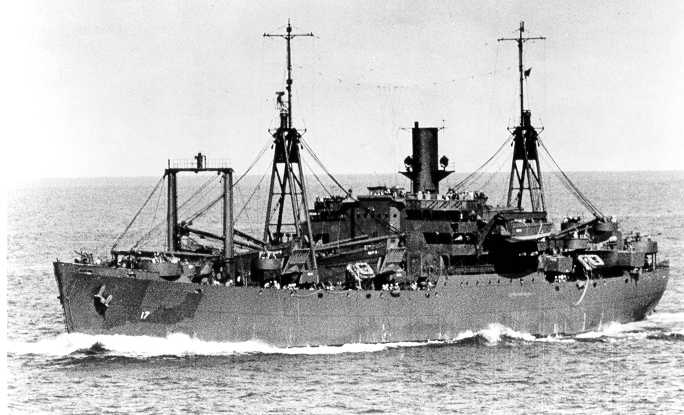
Attack cargo ship Centaurus, May 1944

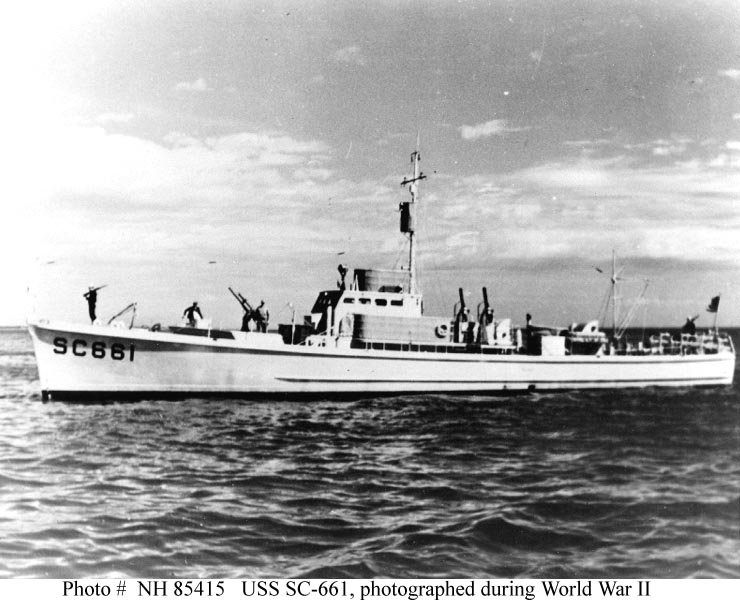
SC-497-class submarine chaser

Rear Admiral Turner in amphibious command ship Rocky Mount

==== Amphibious assault groups ====
Embarking Southern Landing Force (Kwajalein Island)
7th Infantry Division under Maj. Gen. Charles H. Corlett, USA

Destroyer Transport Group (Lt. Cmdr. D.K. O'Connor, USNR)

2 fast transports

1 ex-Caldwell-class destroyer: Manley
1 ex-Clemson-class destroyer: Overton

Advance Transport Unit (Capt. J.B. McGovern)

4 attack transports: Zeilin, Ormsby, President Polk, Windsor
1 attack cargo ship: Virgo
1 landing ship dock: Ashland

Tractor Unit 1 (Cmdr. R.C. Webb)

8 landing ship, tank: LST-34, LST-78, LST-224, LST-226, LST-242, LST-243, LST-246, LST-272

Embarking US Army 708th Amphibious Tank Corps (landing vehicle, tracked, also known as amtracs or amphtracs)

TG 52.5 – Southern Transport Group
Captain Herbert B. Knowles

Transport Division 6 (Capt. T.B. Brittain)

4 attack transports: Fayette, Harris, Harry Lee, Leedstown
1 attack cargo ship: Centaurus
1 landing ship dock: Lindenwald

Transport Division 18 (Capt. Knowles)

4 attack transports: Feland, J. Franklin Bell, Monrovia, Pierce
1 attack cargo ship: Thuban
1 landing ship dock: Belle Grove

Tractor Unit 2 (Cmdr. A.M. Hurst)

8 landing ship, tank: LST-29, LST-31, LST-41, LST-127, LST-218, LST-240, LST-273, LST-481

TG 52.6 – Control Group
Cmdr. J.W. Coleman, USNR

3 submarine chasers

All SC-497-class: SC-539, SC-999, SC-1066

2 landing craft, control: LCC-36, LCC-38

TG 52.7 – Destroyer Screen
Capt. E.M. Thompson

6 destroyers

All Fletcher-class (5 × 5-in. main battery): Franks, Haggard, Hailey, Hazelwood, John Rodgers, Schroeder

2 fast minesweepers

Both ex-Clemson-class destroyers: Perry, Zane

==== Combat groups ====
TG 52.8 – Fire Support Group

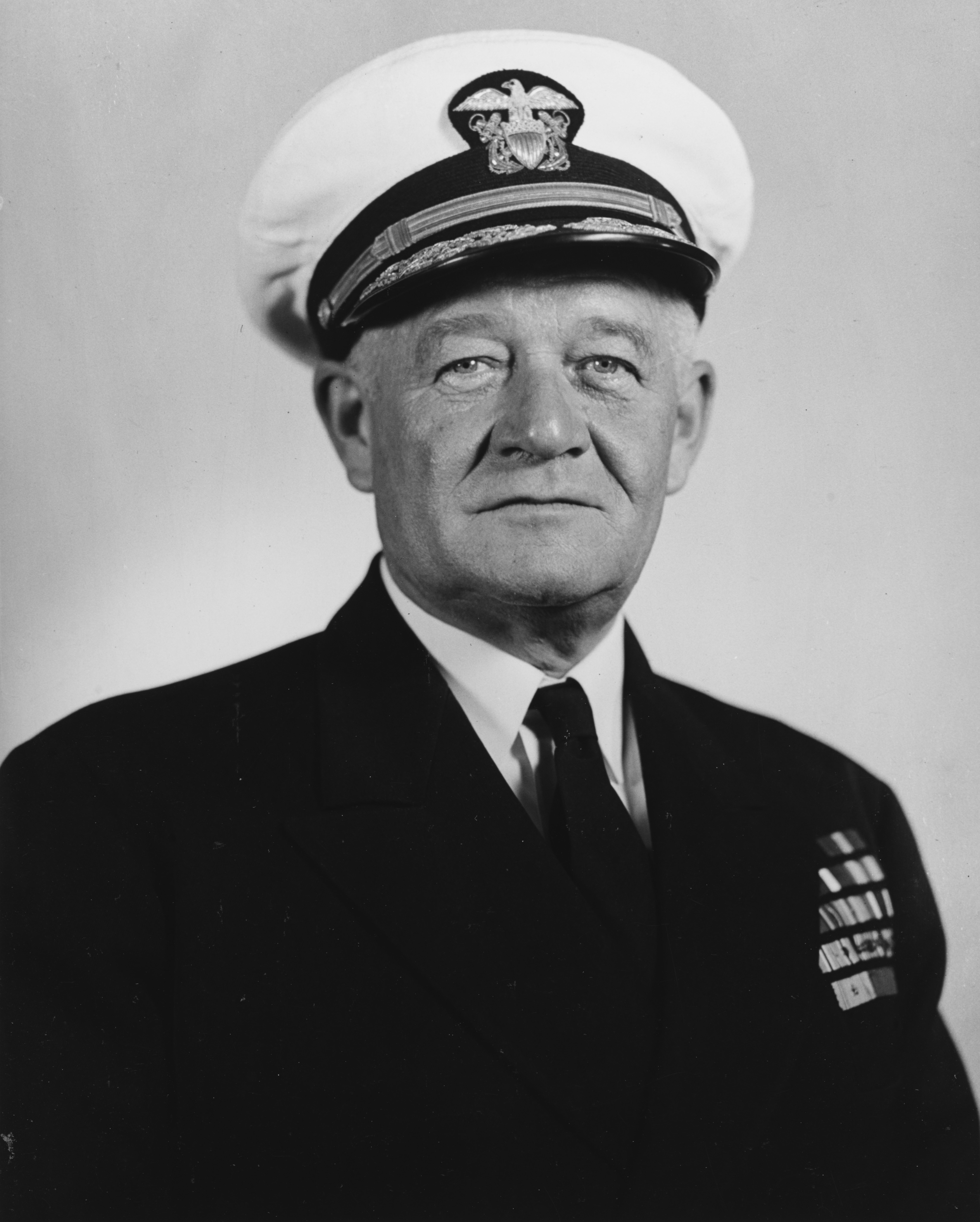
Robert C. Giffen

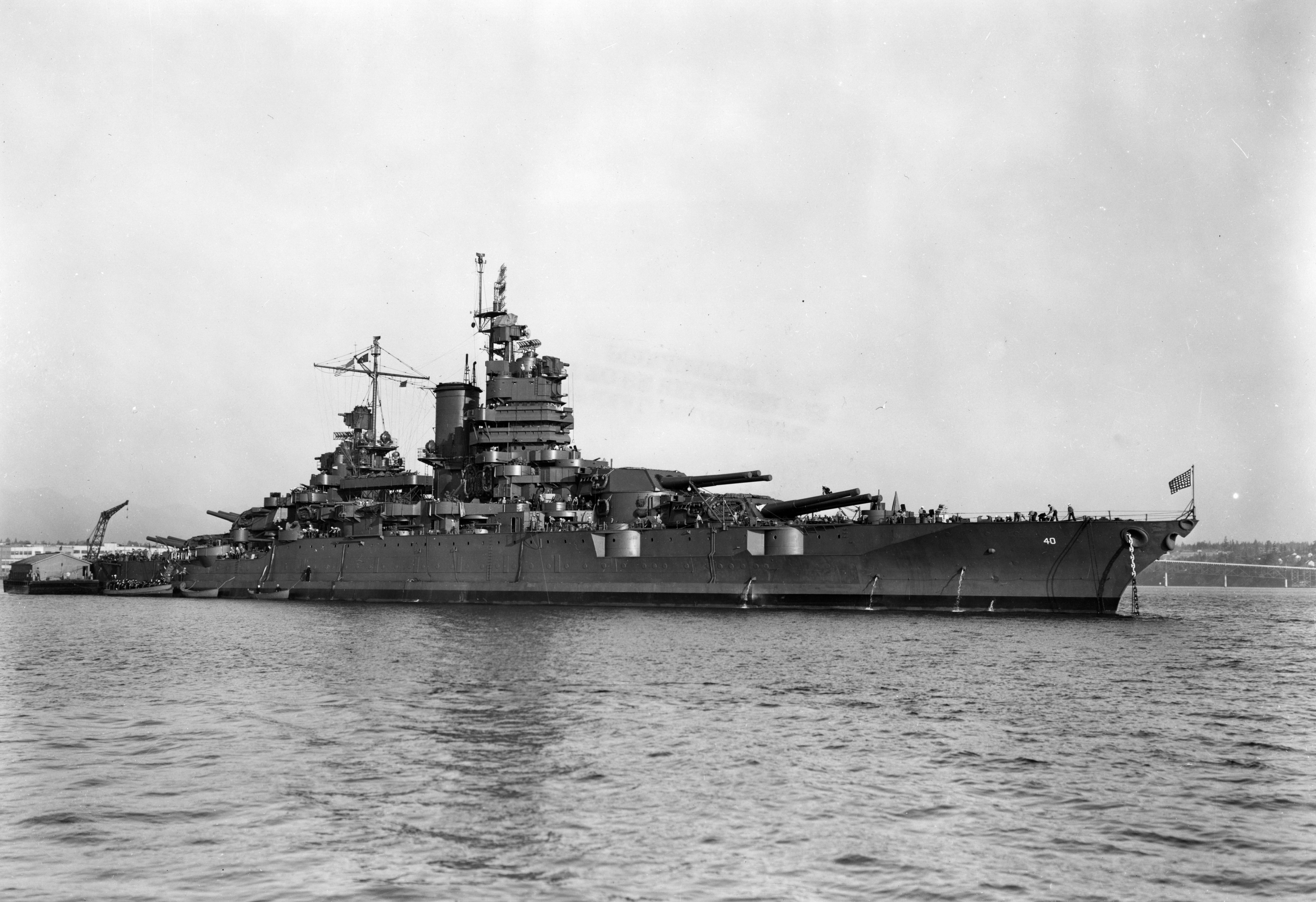
Old battleship New Mexico after modernization

Rear Admiral Robert C. Giffen in heavy cruiser Minneapolis

Unit 1 (Cmdr. J.J. Greytak)

2 destroyers

Both Fletcher-class (5 × 5-in. main battery): McKee, Stevens

Unit 2 (Rear Adm. Giffen)

2 old battleships

1 New Mexico-class (12 × 14-in. main battery): Idaho
1 Pennsylvania-class (12 × 14-in. main battery): Pennsylvania

2 heavy cruisers

Both New Orleans-class (9 × 8-in. main battery): Minneapolis, New Orleans

4 destroyers

3 Benson-class (5 × 5-in. main battery): Bailey, Frazier, Meade
1 Fletcher-class (5 × 5-in. main battery): Hall

Unit 3 (Rear Adm. Robert M. Griffin)

2 old battleships

Both New Mexico-class (12 × 14-in. main battery): New Mexico, Mississippi

1 heavy cruiser

New Orleans-class (9 × 8-in. main battery): San Francisco

3 destroyers

All Fletcher-class (5 × 5-in. main battery): Colahan, Harrison, Murray

Unit 4 (Cmdr. Henry Crommelin)

2 destroyers

Both Fletcher-class (5 × 5-in. main battery): Ringgold, Sigsbee

LCI(L) Unit (Lt. Cmdr. T. Blanchard, USNR)

LCI(L) Division 13:

6 landing craft, infantry, large: LCI(L)-365, LCI(L)-438, LCI(L)-439, LCI(L)-440, LCI(L)-441, LCI(L)-442

LCI(L) Division 15

6 landing craft, infantry, large: LCI(L)-77, LCI(L)-78, LCI(L)-79, LCI(L)-80, LCI(L)-366, LCI(L)-437

TG 52.9 – Carrier Support Group

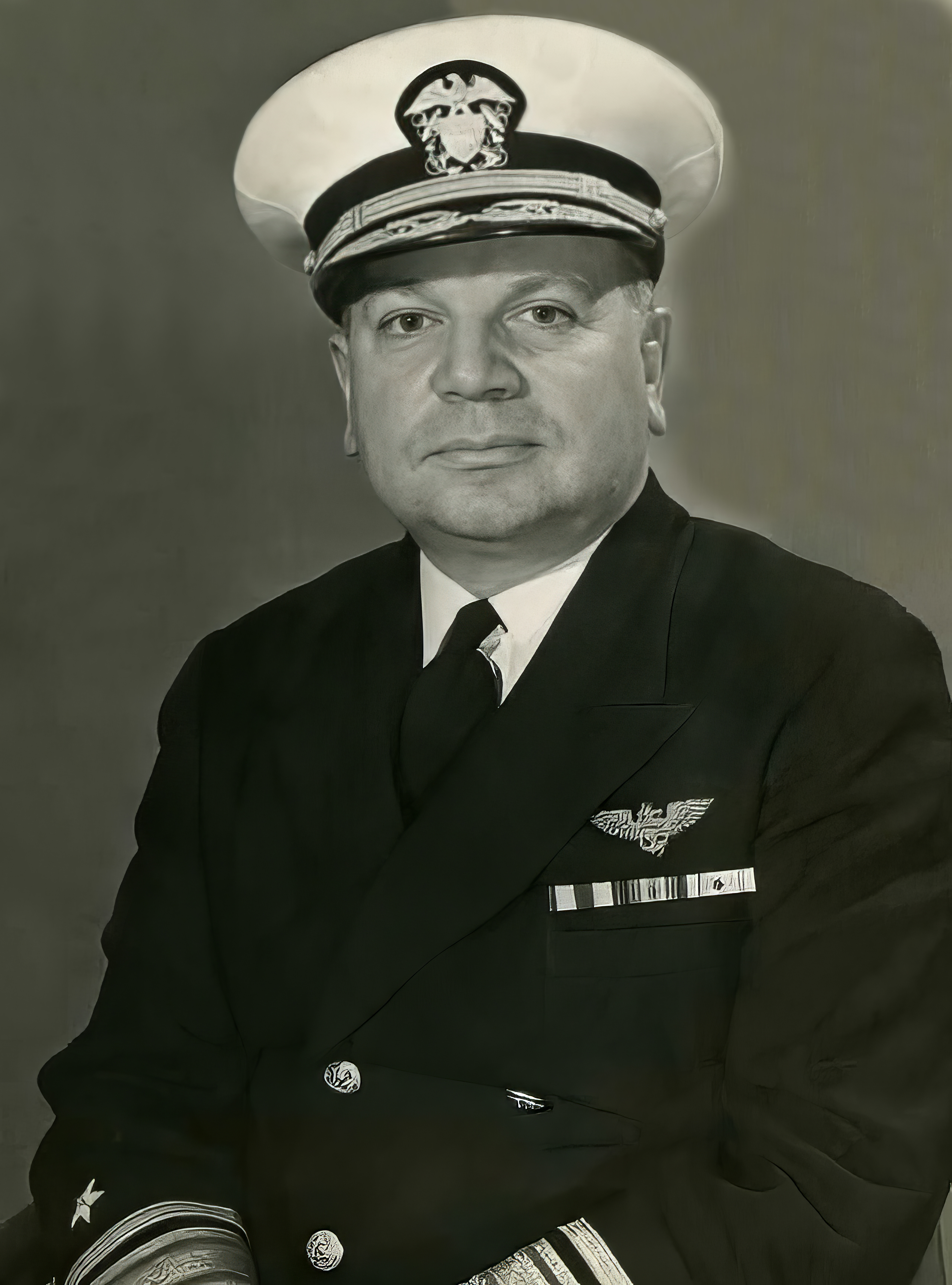
Ralph E. Davison

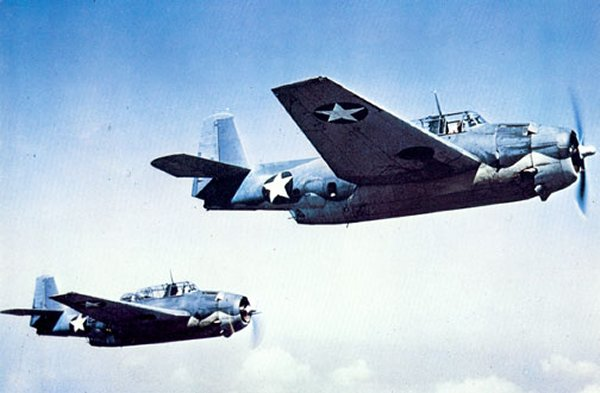
Two Grumman TBF Avenger torpedo bombers

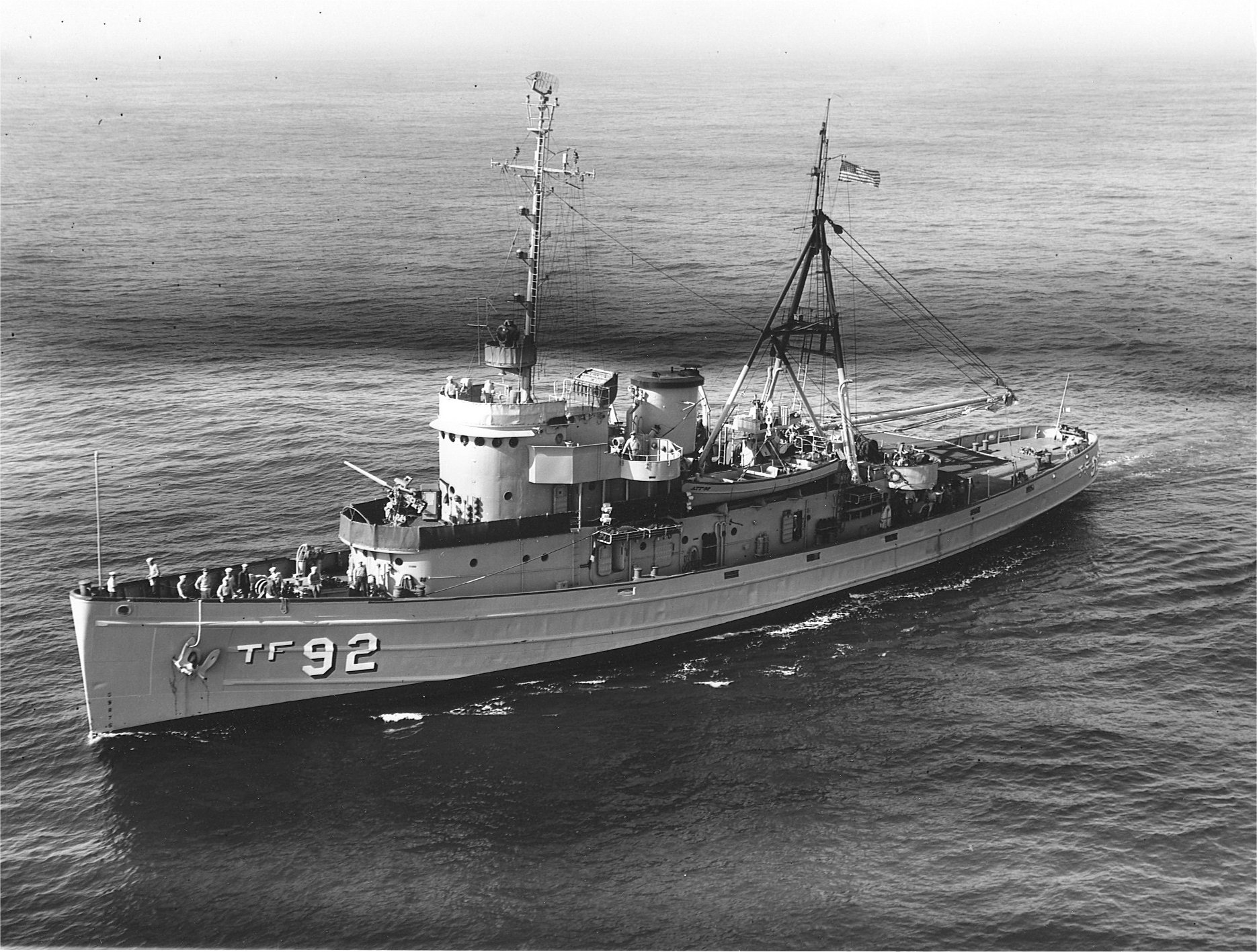
Ocean tug Tawasa, 1940

Rear Admiral Ralph E. Davison

3 escort carriers

Manila Bay (Capt. B.L. Braun)

VC-7 (Lt. Cmdr. W.R. Bartlett)

16 Grumman FM-2 Wildcat fighters
12 TBM Avenger torpedo bombers

Coral Sea (Capt. H.W. Taylor)

VC-33 (Lt. Cmdr. J.J. Lynch)

9 Grumman F4F Wildcat fighters
5 Grumman FM-1 Wildcat fighters
12 Grumman TBF Avenger torpedo bombers

Corregidor (Capt. R.L. Bowman)

VC-44 (Lt. Cmdr. G.M. Clifford)

3 Grumman F4F Wildcat fighters
6 Grumman FM-1 Wildcat fighters
11 Grumman TBF Avenger torpedo bombers

Screen

3 Benson-class (5 × 5-in. main battery): Bancroft, Caldwell, Coghlan
1 Fletcher-class (5 × 5-in. main battery): Halligan

==== Auxiliaries ====
TG 52.10 – Minesweeping and Hydrographic Group
Cmdr. F.F. Sima, USNR

Unit 1

3 minesweepers

All Auk-class: Pursuit, Requisite, Revenge

1 landing craft, control: LCC-39

Unit 2

4 auxiliary motor minesweepers

All YMS-1-class: YMS-90, YMS-91, YMS-383, YMS-388

1 landing craft, control: LCC-37

TG 52.11 – Southern Salvage Unit
Lt. Cmdr. L.H. Curtis, USNR

3 ocean tugs

All Navajo-class: Arapaho, Tekesta, Tawasa

=== Task Force 53 – Northern Attack Force ===
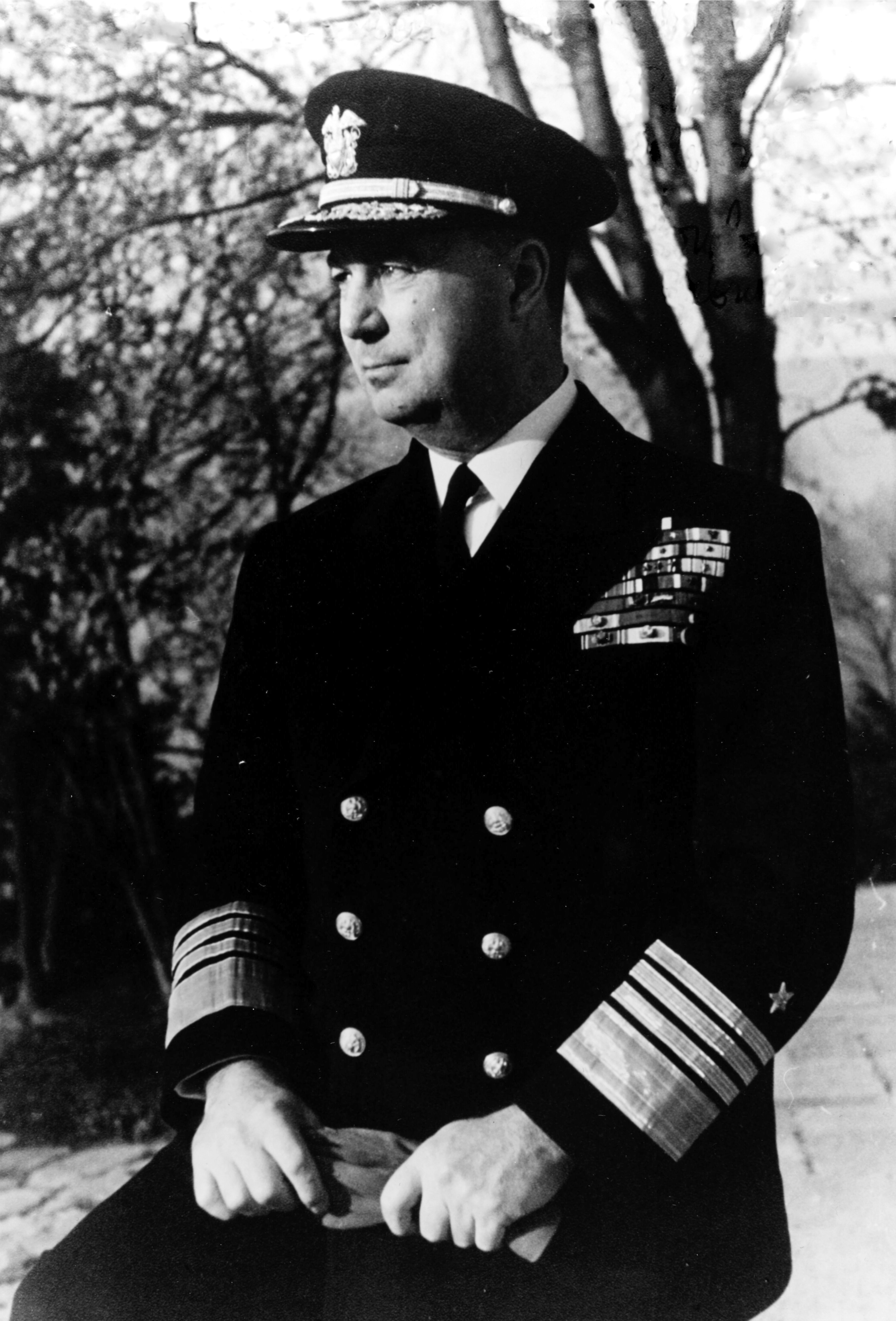
Richard L. Connolly

Rear Admiral Richard L. Conolly in amphibious command ship Appalachian

==== Amphibious assault groups ====
TG 53.4 – Northern Landing Force (Roi-Namur)

4th Marine Division under Maj. Gen. Harry Schmidt, USMC

1 SC-497-class submarine chaser: SC-997

TG 53.9 – Initial Transport Group

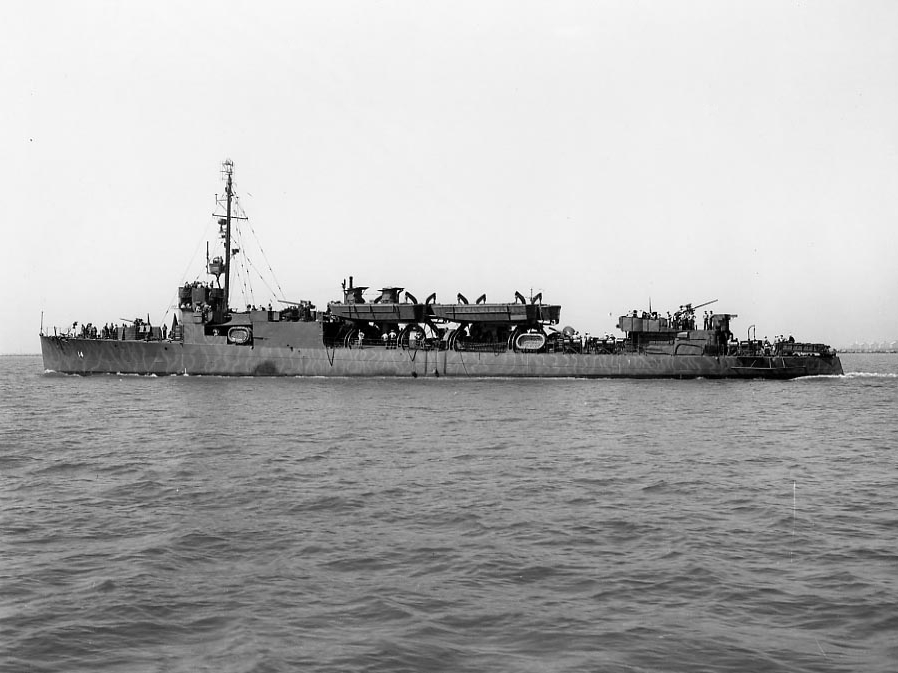
Former destroyer Schley after conversion to high-speed transport

Capt. A.D. Blackledge

Transport Division 26 (Capt. Blackledge)

4 attack transports: Callaway, Sumter, Warren, William P. Biddle
1 attack cargo ship: Almaack
1 landing ship, dock: Epping Forest

Raider Unit (Lt. Cmdr. E.T. Farley, USNR)

1 fast transport

ex-Wickes-class destroyer: Schley

2 destroyers

1 Fletcher-class (5 × 5-in. main battery): Remey
1 Farragut-class (4 × 5-in. main battery): MacDonough

1 fast minesweeper

ex-Wickes-class destroyer: Hogan

LST Unit 1 (Capt. A.J. Robertson)

8 landing ship, tank: LST-38, LST-43, LST-45, LST-121, LST-122, LST-221, LST-270, LST-271
2 submarine chasers

Both SC-497-class: SC-670, SC-1012

1 Fletcher-class destroyer (5 × 5-in. main battery): La Vallette

TG 53.10 – Main Attack Detachment

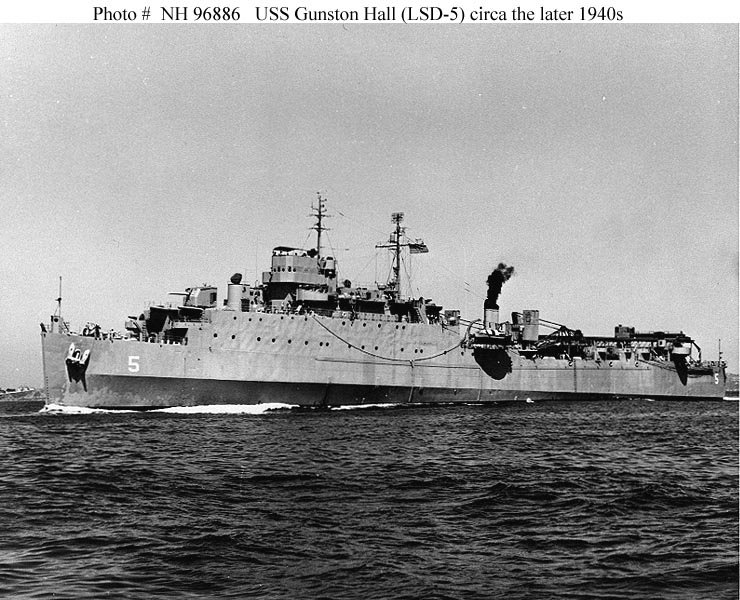
Landing ship dock Gunston Hall

Capt. Pat Buchanan

Transport Division 24

4 attack transports: Doyen, DuPage, Elmore, Wayne
1 attack cargo ship: Aquarius

Transport Division 28 (Capt. H.C. Flanagan)

4 attack transports: Bolivar, Calvert, La Salle, Sheridan
1 attack cargo ship: Alcyone
1 landing ship, dock: Gunston Hall
3 destroyers

1 Fletcher-class (5 × 5-in. main battery): Fletcher
1 Sims-class (5 × 5-in. main battery): Hughes
1 Benham-class (4 × 5-in. main battery): Ellet

2 fast minesweepers

Both ex-Wickes-class destroyers: Hamilton, Stansbury

LST Unit 2 (Capt. J.S. Lillard)

6 landing ship, tank: LST-42, LST-119, LST-126, LST-128, LST-223, LST-274
2 SC-497-class submarine chasers: SC-1028, SC-1031
1 Farragut-class destroyer (4 × 5-in. main battery): Aylwin

==== Combat groups ====
TG 53.5 – Northern Support Group

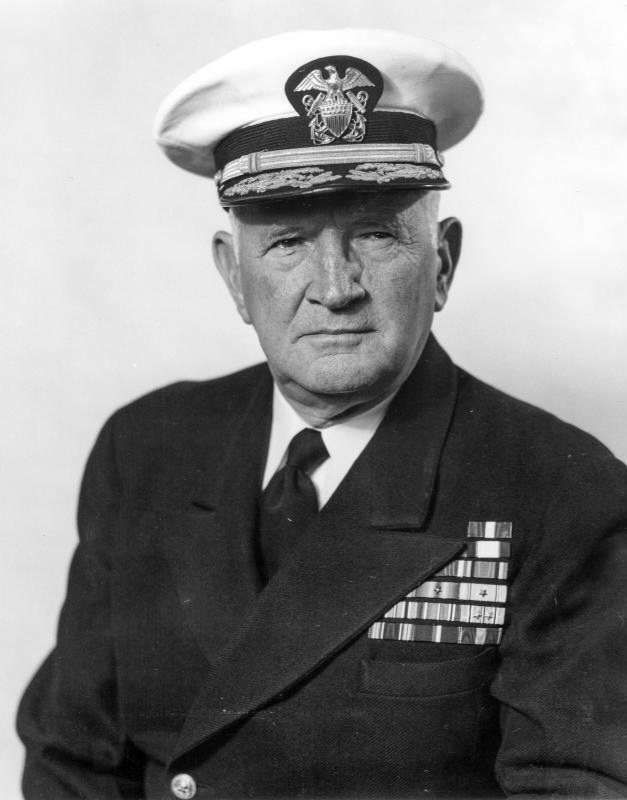
Jesse B. Oldendorf

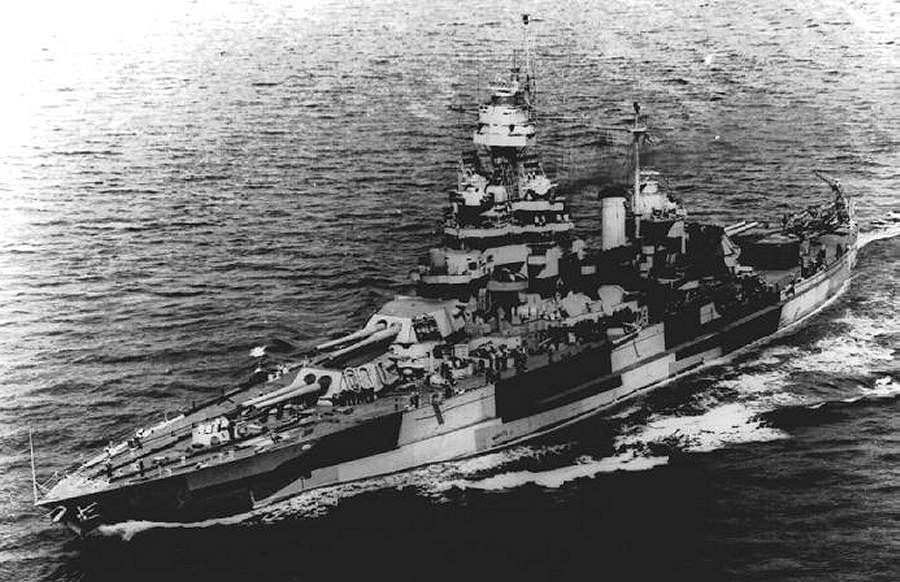
Old battleship Colorado in 1944 after modernization

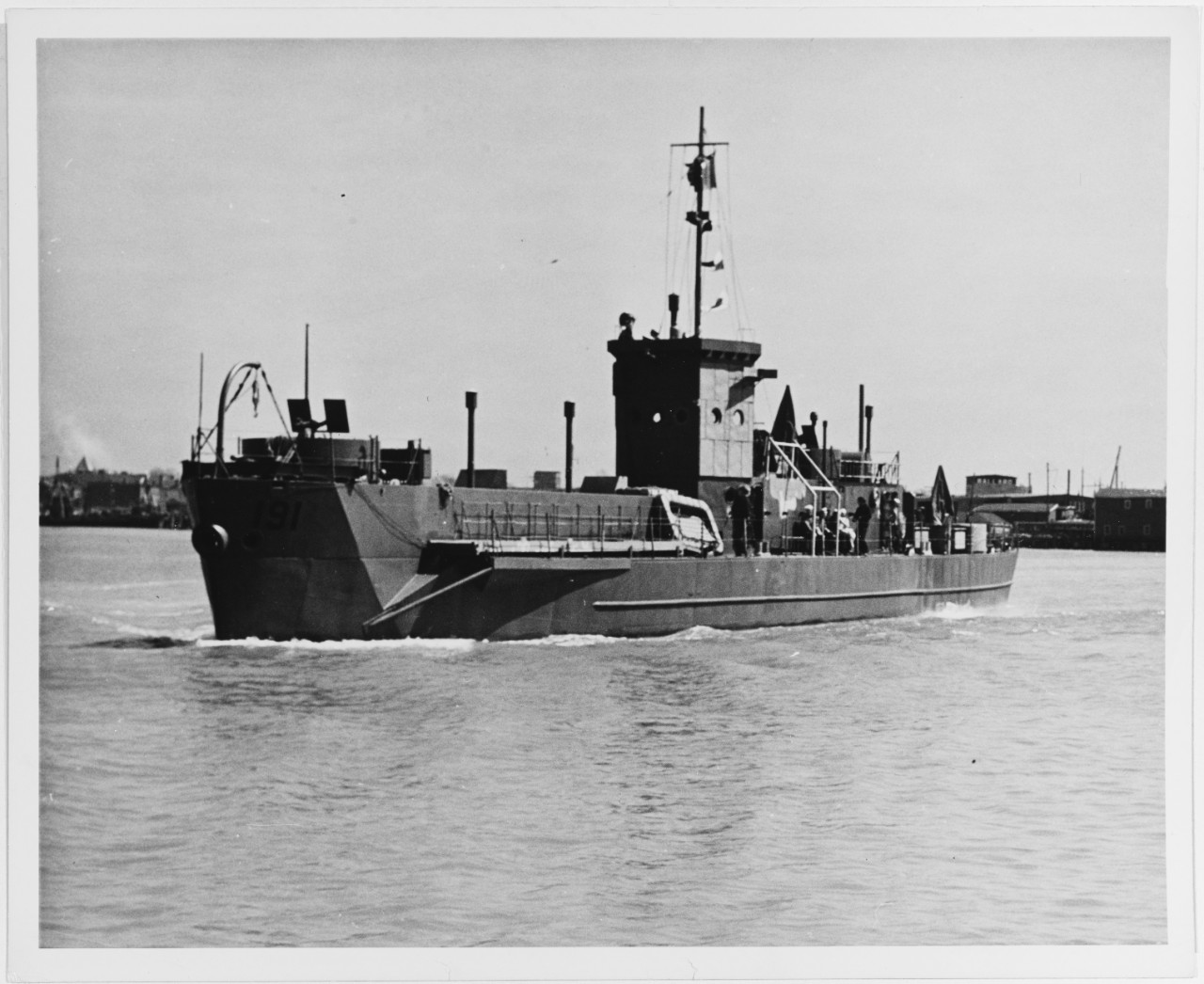
Landing craft, infantry

Rear Admiral Jesse B. Oldendorf in heavy cruiser Louisville

Unit 1 (Rear Adm. Howard F. Kingman)

2 old battleships

1 Colorado-class (8 × 16-in. main battery): Colorado
1 Tennessee-class (12 × 14-in. main battery): Tennessee

1 heavy cruiser

Northampton-class (9 × 8-in. main battery): Louisville

1 light cruiser

Cleveland-class (12 × 6-in. main battery): Mobile

2 destroyers

Both Sims-class (4 × 5-in. main battery): Anderson, Morris

Unit 2 (Rear Adm. Laurance T. DuBose)

1 old battleship

Colorado-class (8 × 16-in. main battery): Maryland

1 heavy cruiser

Portland-class (9 × 8-in. main battery): Indianapolis

2 light cruisers

Both Cleveland-class (12 × 6-in. main battery): Biloxi, Santa Fe

2 destroyers

Both Sims-class (5 × 5-in. main battery): Mustin, Russell

Unit 3 (Cmdr. J.C. Woelfel)

2 Fletcher-class destroyers (5 × 5-in. main battery): Haraden, Porterfield
3 landing craft, infantry

Unit 4 (Cmdr. C.C. Shute)

2 Fletcher-class destroyers (5 × 5-in. main battery): Hopewell, Johnston

Unit 5 (Capt. E.R. McLean)

1 Porter-class destroyer (8 × 5-in. main battery): Phelps
6 landing craft, infantry

TG 53.6 – Carrier Group

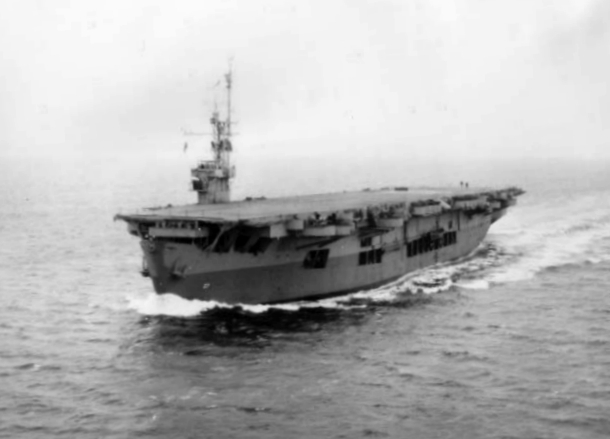
Escort carrier Suwanee underway in Puget Sound, January 1945

Rear Admiral Van H. Ragsdale

3 escort carriers

Sangamon (Capt. E.P. Moore)

Air Group 37 (Lt. Cmdr. F.L. Bates)

VF-37: 12 Grumman F6F Hellcat fighters
VC-37: 9 Douglas SBD Dauntless dive bombers, 10 Grumman TBF Avenger torpedo bombers

Suwanee (Capt. W.D. Johnson)

Air Group 60 (Lt. Cmdr. H.O. Feilbach, USNR)

VF-60: 12 Grumman F6F Hellcat fighters
VC-60: 9 Douglas SBD Dauntless dive bombers, 9 Grumman TBF Avenger torpedo bombers

Chenango (Capt. D. Ketcham)

Air Group 35 (Lt. Cmdr. S. Mandarich)

VF-35: 12 Grumman F6F Hellcat fighters
VC-35: 9 Douglas SBD Dauntless dive bombers, 9 Grumman TBF Avenger torpedo bombers

Screen (Cmdr. I.H. Nunn)

3 destroyers

All Farragut-class (4 × 5-in. main battery): Dale, Farragut, Monaghan

==== Auxiliaries ====
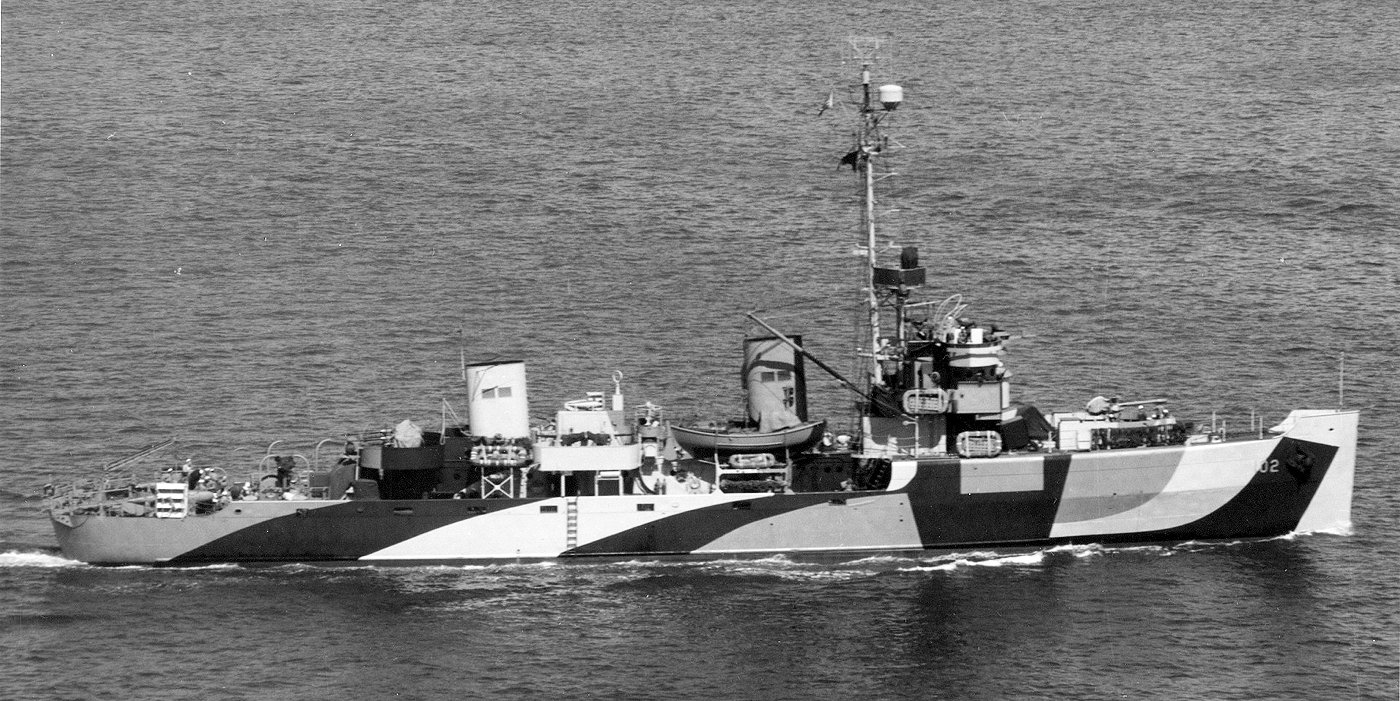
Minesweeper Motive underway at San Pedro Bay, California, May 1944

TG 53.3 – Minesweeper Group
Cmdr. W.R. Loud

3 minesweepers

All Auk-class: Chief, Heed, Motive

1 fast minesweeper

ex-Wickes-class destroyer: Palmer

3 motor minesweepers

YMS-262, YMS-263, YMS-283, YMS-320

TG 53.12 – Northern Salvage Group
Lt. Cmdr. H.O. Foss

3 ocean tugs

2 Navajo-class: Chickasaw, Mataco
1 Abnaki-class: Molala

=== Task Force 58 – Fast Carrier Force ===
Carrier admirals

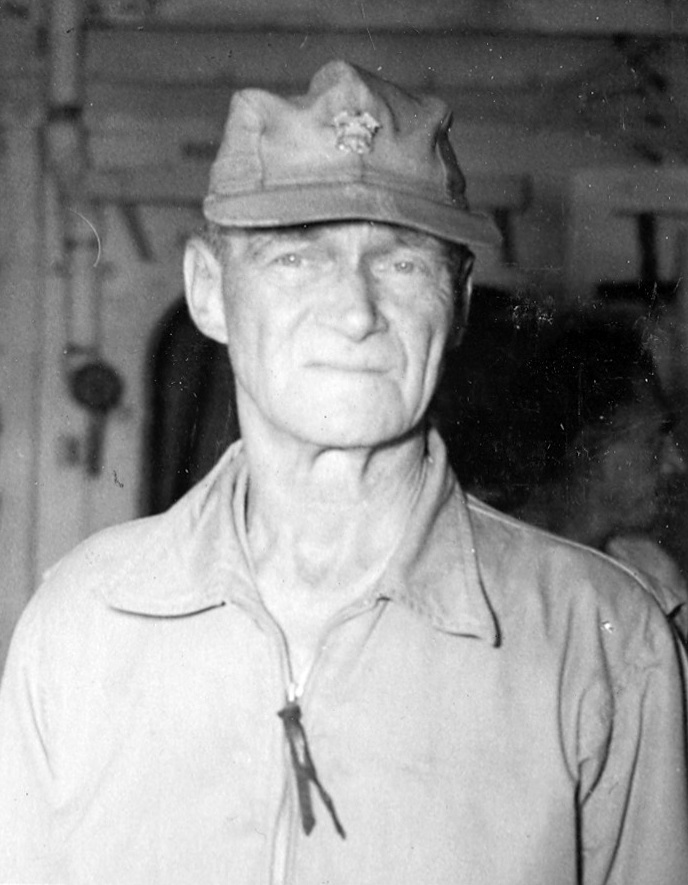
Marc A. Mitscher

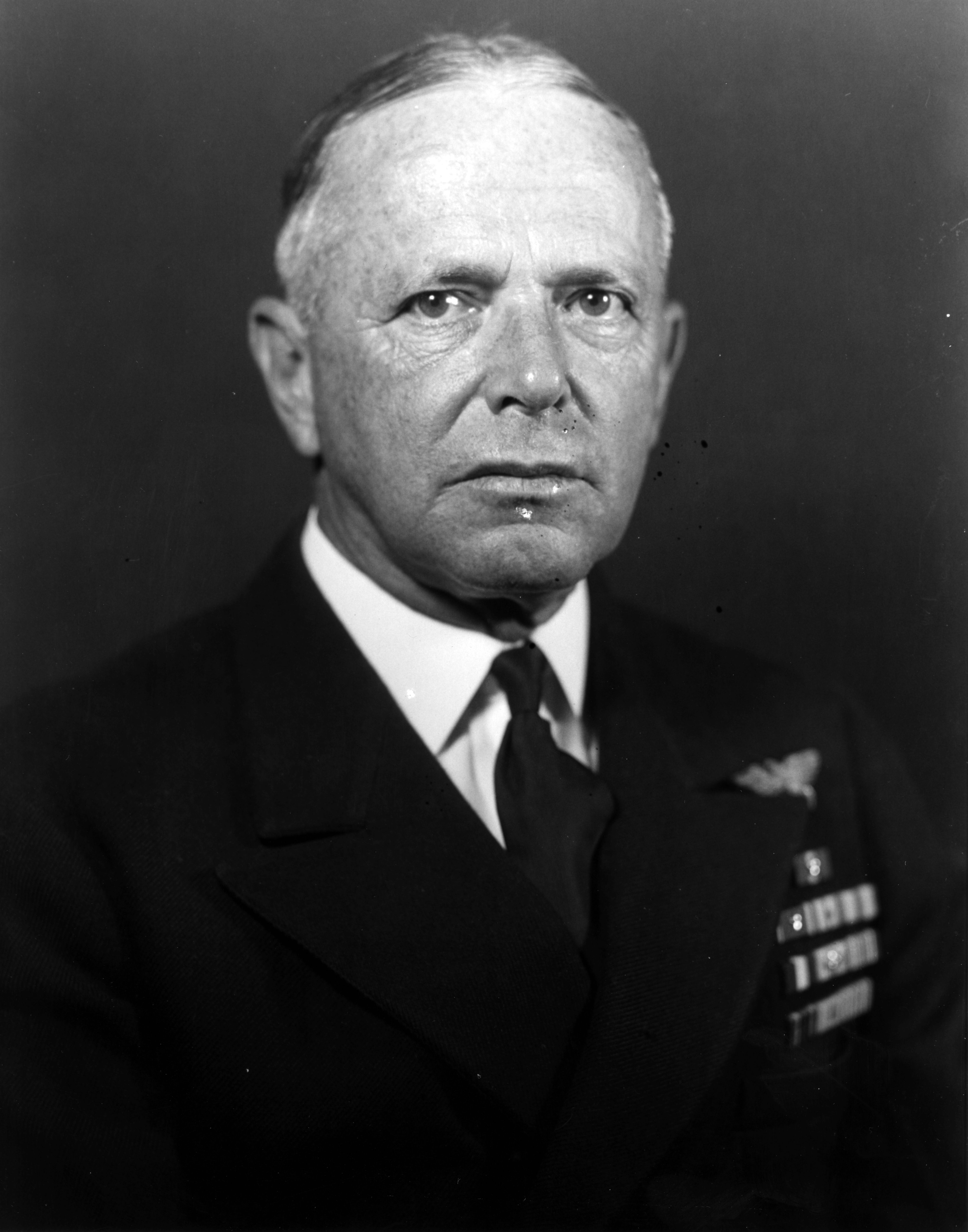
John W. Reeves

Rear Admiral Marc A. Mitscher

==== TG 58.1 – Carrier Task Group 1 ====
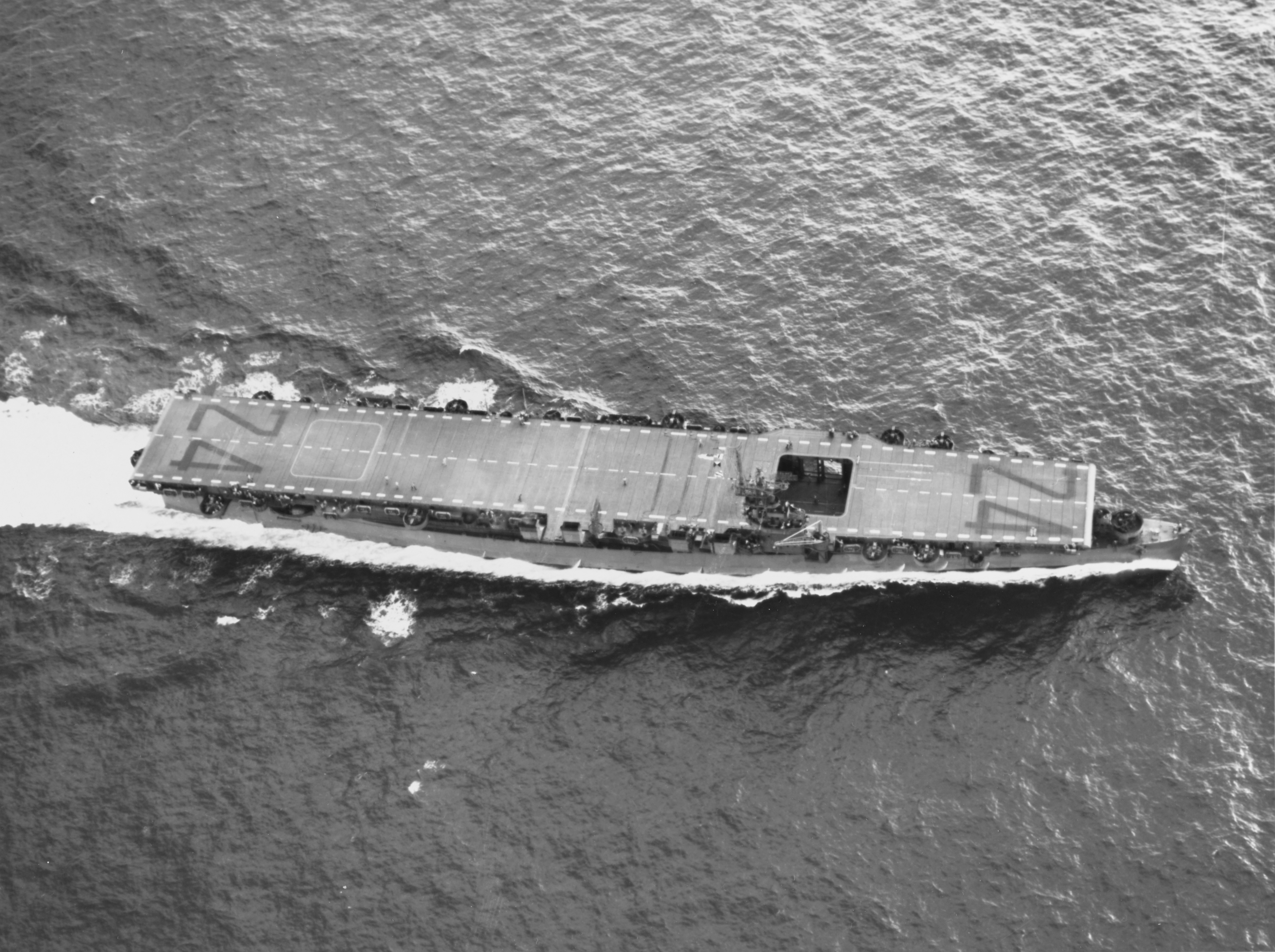
Light carrier Belleau Wood in 1943

Rear Admiral John W. Reeves Jr.

2 fleet carriers

Enterprise (Capt. M.B. Gardner)

Air Group 10 (Lt. Cmdr. W.R. Kane)

VF-10: 32 Grumman F6F Hellcat fighters
VB-10: 30 Douglas SBD Dauntless dive bombers
VT-10: 16 Grumman TBF Avenger torpedo bombers

Yorktown (Capt. J.J. Clark)

Air Group 5 (Lt. Cmdr. E.E. Stebbins)

VF-5: 36 Grumman F6F Hellcat fighters
VB-5: 36 Douglas SBD Dauntless dive bombers, 1 Grumman F6F Hellcat fighter
VT-5: 18 Grumman TBF Avenger torpedo bombers

1 light carrier

Belleau Wood (Capt. A.M. Pride)

Air Group 24 (Lt. Cmdr. E.M. Link)

VF-24: 24 Grumman F6F Hellcat fighters
VT-24: 8 Grumman TBF Avenger torpedo bombers

Battleship Division 8 (Rear Adm. Glenn B. Davis in Indiana)

3 fast battleships

1 North Carolina-class (9 × 16-in. main battery): Washington
2 South Dakota-class (9 × 16-in. main battery): Indiana, Massachusetts

1 anti-aircraft light cruiser

1 Atlanta-class (12 × 5-in. main battery): (Note: These cruisers were intended as destroyer leaders when designed. After the first two to be used in this role, Atlanta and Juneau, were lost at the Naval Battle of Guadalcanal, this mission was abandoned and the anti-aircraft mission adopted.) Oakland

Screen (Capt. Sherman R. Clark)

9 destroyers

All Fletcher-class (5 × 5-in. main battery): Caperton, Clarence K. Bronson, Cogswell, Cotten, Dortch, Gatling, Healy, Ingersoll, Knapp

==== TG 58.2 – Carrier Task Group 2 ====
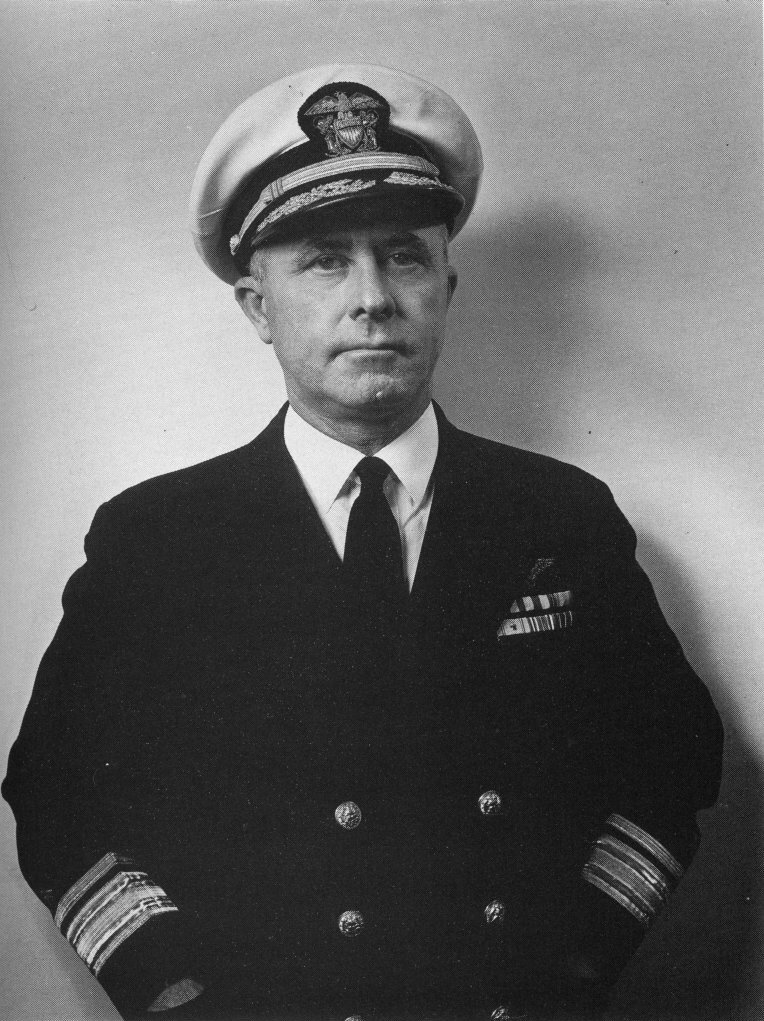
Alfred E. Montgomery

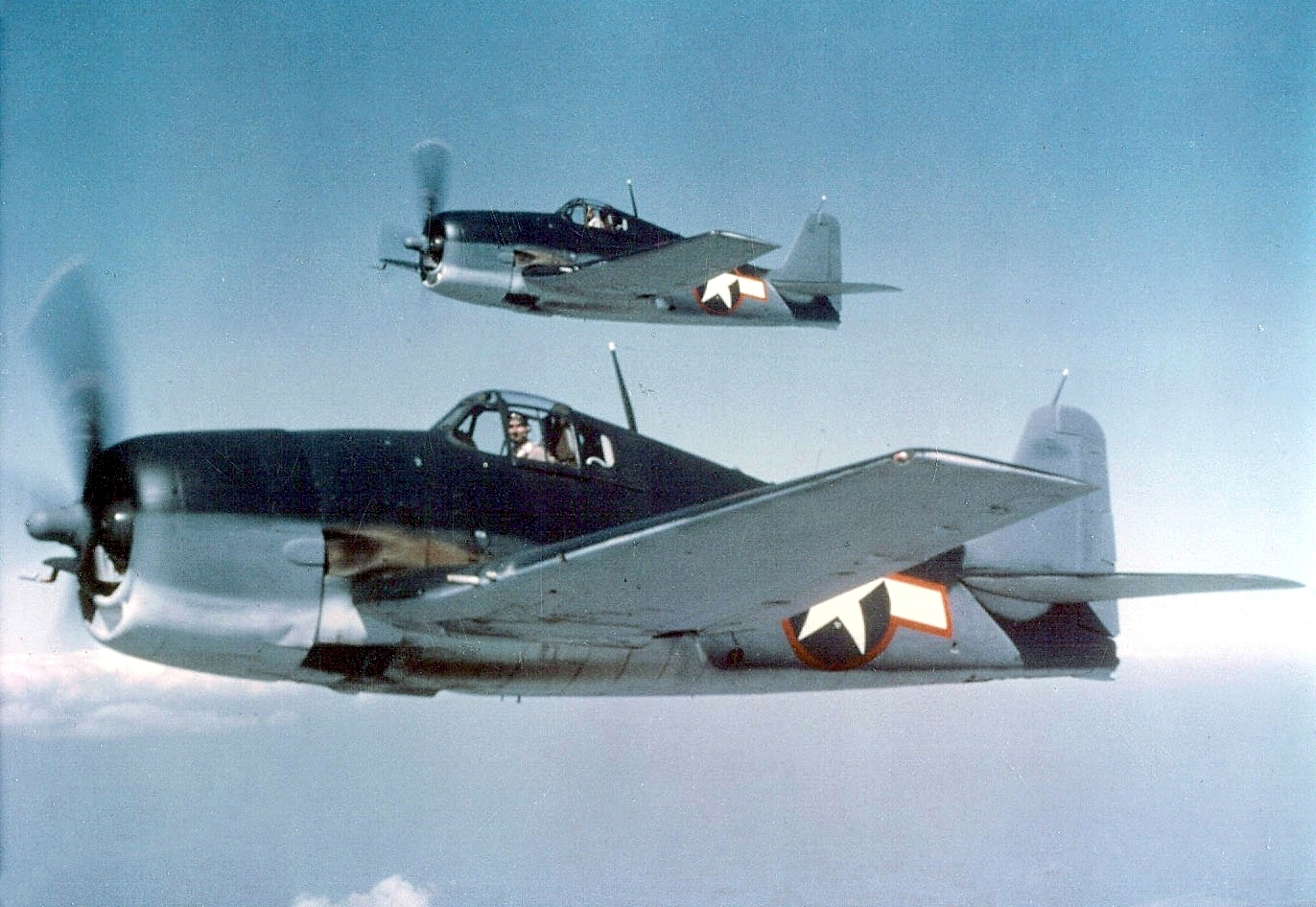
Two Grumman F6F Hellcat fighters, May 1943

Rear Admiral Alfred E. Montgomery in fleet carrier Essex

2 fleet carriers

Essex (Capt. R.A. Ofstie)

Air Group 9 (Lt. Cmdr. P.H. Torrey)

VF-9: 35 Grumman F6F Hellcat fighters
VB-9: 34 Douglas SBD Dauntless dive bombers, 1 Grumman F6F Hellcat fighter
VT-9: 19 Grumman TBF Avenger torpedo bombers

Intrepid (Capt. T.L. Sprague)

Air Group 6 (Lt. Cmdr. D.B. Ingerslew)

VF-6: 37 Grumman F6F Hellcat fighters
VB-6: 36 Douglas SBD Dauntless dive bombers
VT-6: 19 Grumman TBF Avenger torpedo bombers

1 light carrier

Cabot (Capt. M.F. Schoeffel)

Air Group 31 (Lt. Cmdr. R.A. Winston)

VF-31: 24 Grumman F6F Hellcat fighters
VT-31: 9 Grumman TBF Avenger torpedo bombers

Battleship Division 9 (Rear Adm. E.W. Hanson in South Dakota)

3 fast battleships

2 South Dakota-class (9 × 16-in. main battery): South Dakota, Alabama
1 North Carolina-class (9 × 16-in. main battery): North Carolina

Screen (Rear Adm. L. J. Wiltse in San Diego)

1 anti-aircraft light cruiser

Atlanta-class (12 × 5-in. main battery): San Diego

9 destroyers

7 Fletcher-class (5 × 5-in. main battery): Hunt, Lewis Hancock, The Sullivans, Miller, Hickox, Stephen Potter
2 Benham-class (4 × 5-in. main battery): Stack, Sterett

==== TG 58.3 – Carrier Task Group 3 ====
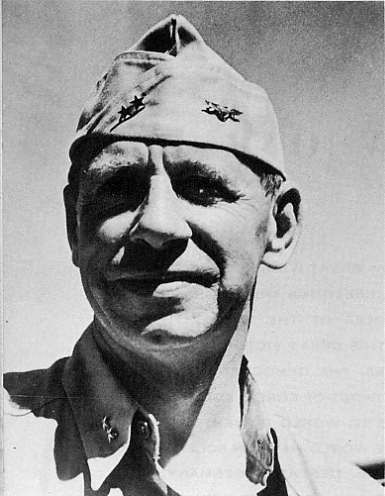
Frederick C. Sherman

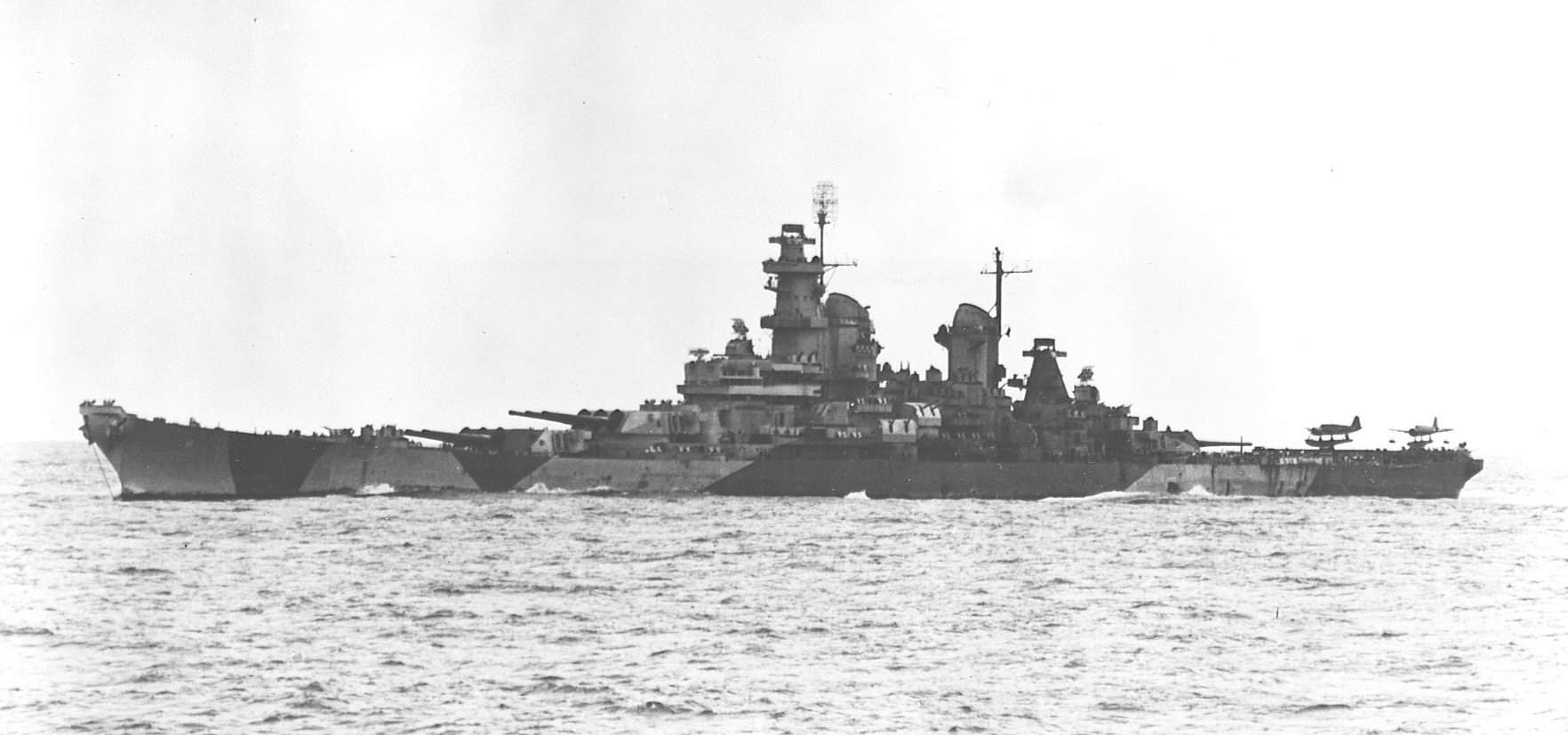
Fast battleship Iowa ca. 1944

Rear Admiral Frederick C. Sherman in fleet carrier Bunker Hill

1 fleet carrier

Bunker Hill (Capt. J.J. Ballentine)

Air Group 17 (Cmdr. R.H. Dale)

VF-18: 37 Grumman F6F Hellcat fighters
VB-17: 32 Curtiss SB2C Helldiver dive bombers, 1 Grumman F6F Hellcat fighter
VT-17: 20 Grumman TBF Avenger torpedo bombers

2 light carriers

Monterey (Capt. L.T. Hundt)

Air Group 30 (Lt. Cmdr. J.G. Sliney, USNR)

VF-30: 25 Grumman F6F Hellcat fighters
VT-30: 9 Grumman TBF Avenger torpedo bombers

Cowpens (Capt. R.P. McConnell)

Air Group 25 (Lt. R.H. Price)

VF-25: 24 Grumman F6F Hellcat fighters
VT-25: 9 Grumman TBF Avenger torpedo bombers

Battleship Division 7 (Rear Adm. O.M. Hustvedt in Iowa)

2 fast battleships

Both Iowa-class (9 × 16-in. main battery): Iowa, New Jersey

1 heavy cruiser

Wichita-class (9 × 8-in. main battery): Wichita

Screen (Capt. C.F. Espe in Izard)

9 destroyers

8 Fletcher-class (5 × 5-in. main battery): Bell, Bradford, Brown, Burns, Charrette, Conner, Cowell, Izard
1 Benham-class (4 × 5-in. main battery): Wilson

==== TG 58.4 – Carrier Task Group 4 ====
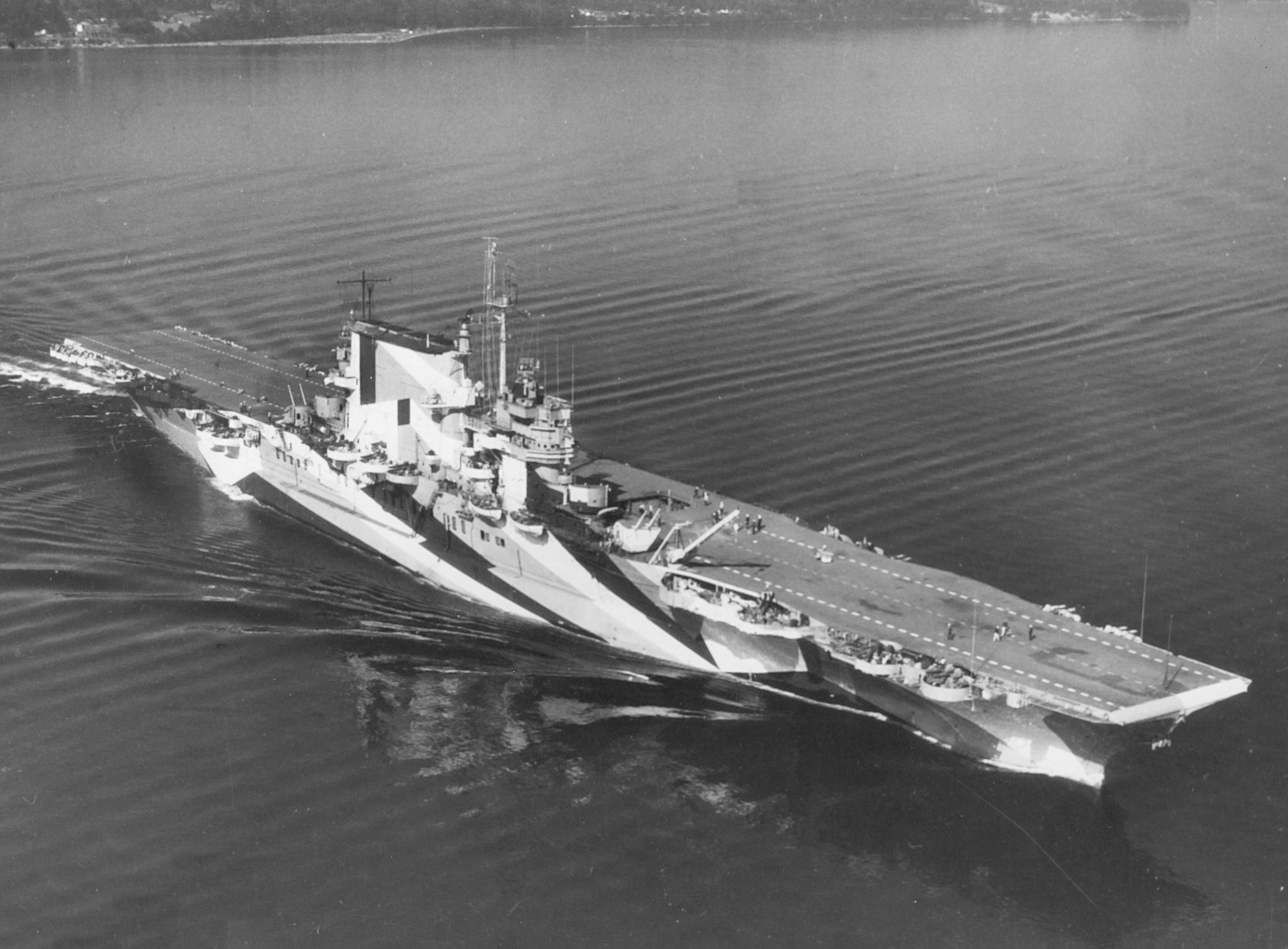
Fleet carrier Saratoga underway in Puget Sound, 1944

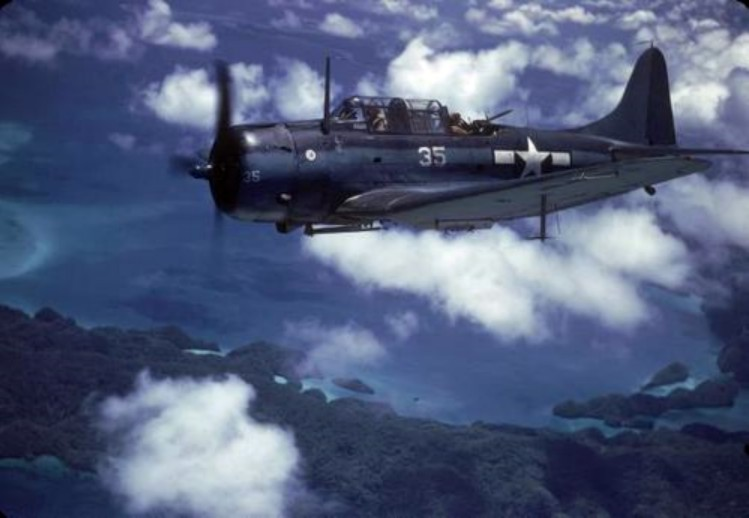
Douglas SBD Dauntless dive bomber over Peleliu, 1944

Rear Admiral Samuel P. Ginder in fleet carrier Saratoga

1 fleet carrier

Saratoga (Capt. J.H. Cassady)

Air Group 3 (Cmdr. J.C. Clifton)

VF-12: 36 Grumman F6F Hellcat fighters
VB-12: 24 Douglas SBD Dauntless dive bombers
VT-12: 18 Grumman TBF Avenger torpedo bombers

2 light carriers

Princeton (Capt. G.R. Henderson)

Air Group 23 (Lt. Cmdr. H.L. Miller)

VF-23: 24 Grumman F6F Hellcat fighters
VT-23: 9 Grumman TBF Avenger torpedo bombers

Langley (Capt. W.M. Dillon)

Air Group 32 (Cmdr. E.G. Konrad)

VF-32: 22 Grumman F6F Hellcat fighters
VT-32: 9 Grumman TBF Avenger torpedo bombers

Cruiser Division 10 (Rear Adm. Leo H. Thebaud in Boston)

2 heavy cruisers

1 Baltimore-class (9 × 8-in. main battery): Baltimore, Boston

1 anti-aircraft light cruiser

Atlanta-class (12 × 5-in. main battery): San Juan

Screen (Capt. J.M. Higgins in Maury)

8 destroyers

4 Mahan-class (5 × 5-in. main battery): Dunlap, Fanning, Case, Cummings
4 Gridley-class (4 × 5-in. main battery): Gridley, Maury, Craven, McCall

==== TG 50.15 – Neutralization Unit ====
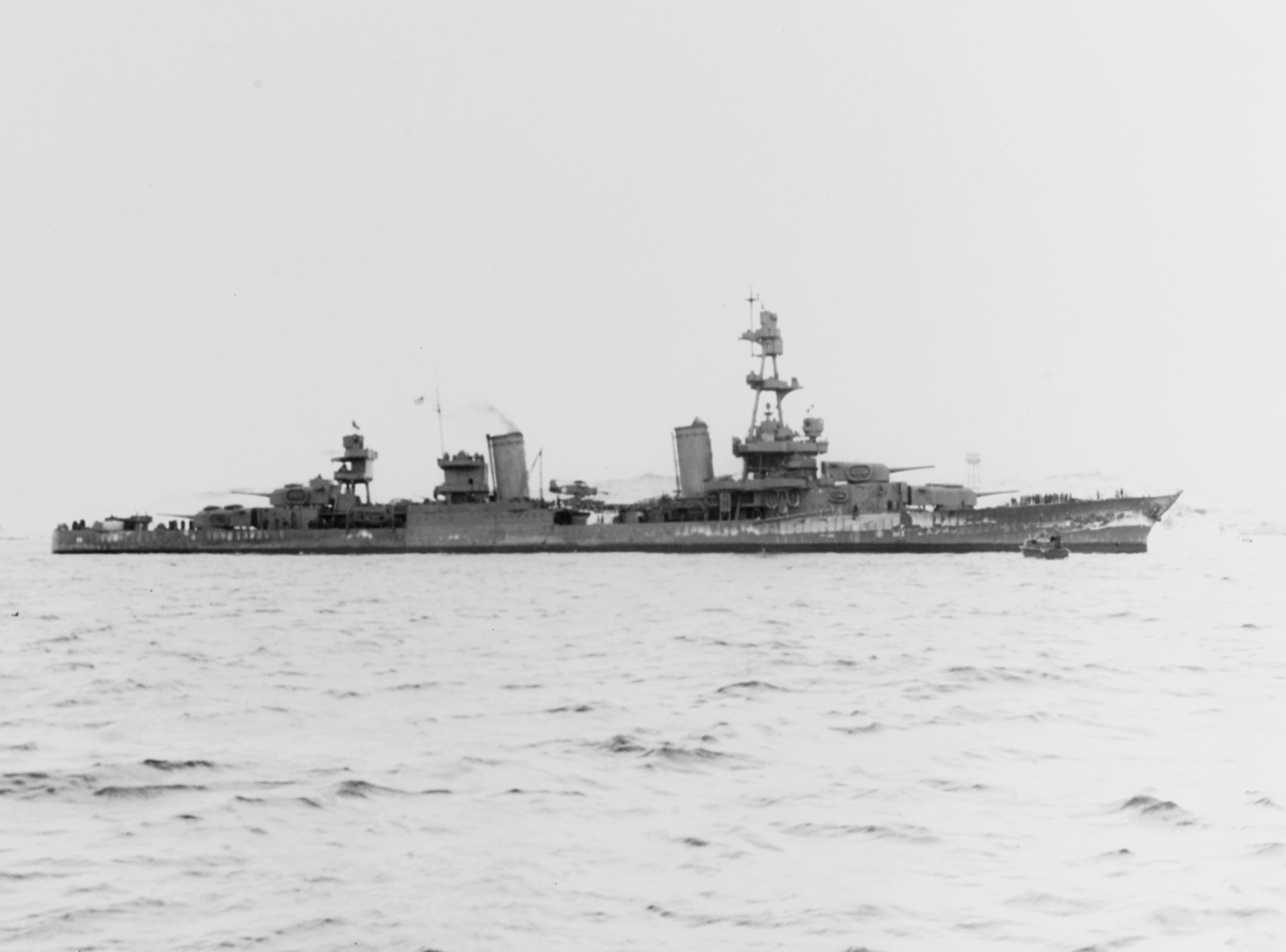
Heavy cruiser Salt Lake City in the Aleutians, March 1943

Rear Admiral Ernest G. Small

3 heavy cruisers

2 Pensacola-class (10 × 8-in. main battery): Pensacola, Salt Lake City
1 Northampton-class (9 × 8-in. main battery): Chester

4 destroyers

All Fletcher-class (5 × 5-in. main battery): Abbot, Erben, Hale, Walker

2 fast minelayers

1 ex-Wickes-class destroyer: Ramsay
1 ex-Clemson-class destroyer: Preble

== See also ==
Orders of battle involving United States Marine forces in the Pacific Theatre of World War II:

- Battle of Guadalcanal order of battle
- Battle of Saipan order of battle
- Guam (1944) order of battle
- Battle of Leyte opposing forces
- Battle of Peleliu opposing forces
- Battle of Iwo Jima order of battle
- Okinawa ground order of battle
  - Naval Base Tarawa

== Bibliography ==
- Morison, Samuel Eliot (1951). Aleutians, Gilberts and Marshalls: June 1942 April 1944. History of United States Naval Operations in World War II. Vol. VII. Boston: Little, Brown and Co. ISBN 978-0-316-58307-7.
- Rottman, Gordon L. (2004). The Marshall Islands 1944: Operation Flintlock, the capture of Kwajalein and Eniwetok. Oxford: Osprey Publishing Ltd. ISBN 978-1-84176-851-9.
