= USS LST-218 =

LST-1-class landing ship tank

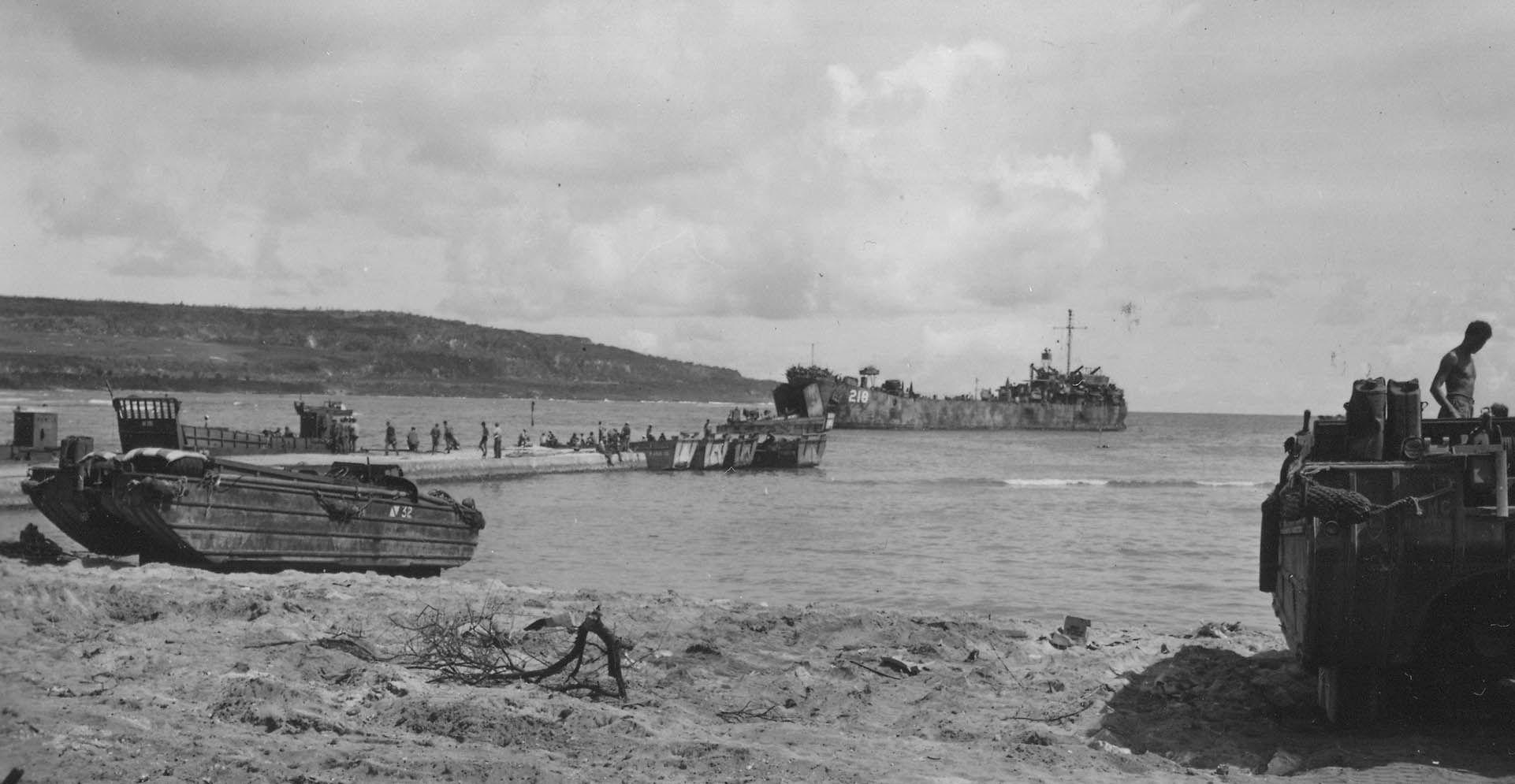
- USS LST-218 at Saipan on 3 August 1944

History

United States
- Name: LST-218
- Builder: Chicago Bridge and Iron Co., Seneca
- Laid down: 11 February 1943
- Launched: 20 July 1943
- Sponsored by: Mrs. Don Leach
- Commissioned: 12 August 1943
- Decommissioned: 19 January 1946
- Renamed: Q020, 19 January 1946
- Identification: Callsign: NHAF
- Honors and awards: See Awards
- Fate: Transferred to South Korea, 3 May 1955

History

South Korea
- Name: Bi Bong; (비봉)
- Namesake: Bibong
- Acquired: 3 May 1955
- Commissioned: 13 September 1955
- Decommissioned: 31 March 1997
- Reclassified: LST-673
- Identification: Pennant number: LST-809
- Fate: Unknown

General characteristics
- Class & type: LST-1-class tank landing ship
- Displacement: 4,080 long tons (4,145 t) full load; 2,160 long tons (2,190 t) landing
- Length: 328 ft (100 m) oa
- Beam: 50 ft (15 m)
- Draft: Full load: 8 ft 2 in (2.49 m) forward; 14 ft 1 in (4.29 m) aft; Landing at 2,160 t: 3 ft 11 in (1.19 m) forward; 9 ft 10 in (3.00 m) aft
- Installed power: 2 × 900 hp (670 kW) Electro-Motive Diesel 12-567A diesel engines; 1,700 shp (1,300 kW)
- Propulsion: 1 × Falk main reduction gears; 2 × Propellers
- Speed: 12 kn (22 km/h; 14 mph)
- Range: 24,000 nmi (44,000 km; 28,000 mi) at 9 kn (17 km/h; 10 mph) while displacing 3,960 long tons (4,024 t)
- Boats & landing craft carried: 2 or 6 x LCVPs
- Capacity: 2,100 tons oceangoing maximum; 350 tons main deckload
- Troops: 16 officers, 147 enlisted men
- Complement: 13 officers, 104 enlisted men
- Armament: Varied, ultimate armament; 2 × twin 40 mm (1.57 in) Bofors guns; 4 × single 40 mm Bofors guns; 12 × 20 mm (0.79 in) Oerlikon cannons

USS LST-218 was a LST-1-class tank landing ship in the United States Navy during World War II. She was later sold to South Korean Navy as ROKS Bi Bong (LST-809).

== Construction and career ==
LST-218 was laid down on 11 February 1943 at Chicago Bridge and Iron Co., Quincy, Massachusetts. Launched on 20 July 1943 and commissioned on 12 August 1943.

=== Service in the United States ===
During World War II, LST-218 was assigned to the Asiatic-Pacific theater. She took part in the Gilbert Islands operations from 21 November 8 December 1943. She also participated in the occupation of Kwajalein and Majuro Atolls from 31 January to 8 February 1944, the occupation of Eniwetok Atoll from 17 to 23 February 1944, the capture and occupation of Tinian from 24 July to 10 August 1944.

Throughout post-war year service, she was sent for occupation service in the Far East from 17 to 29 October 1945 and 16 November 1945 to 19 January 1946.

LST-218 was decommissioned on 19 January 1946 and was assigned to Commander Naval Forces Far East (COMNAVFE) Shipping Control Authority for Japan (SCAJAP) from 19 January 1946 to 28 January 1950 in which she was designated Q020. She was put into the Pacific Reserve Fleet following the end of her service there and later loaned to South Korea.

She was struck from the Navy Register.

=== Service in South Korea ===
ROKS Bi Bong was acquired by the South Korean Navy on 3 May 1955 and was commissioned on 13 September 1955.

Later in the 1970s, she was designated as LST-673.

She was decommissioned on 31 March 1997 and her fate is unknown.

== Awards ==
LST-218 have earned the following awards:

- American Campaign Medal
- Asiatic-Pacific Campaign Medal (4 battle stars)
- World War II Victory Medal
- Navy Occupation Service Medal (with Asia clasp)

== Sources ==
- United States. Dept. of the Treasury (1962). Treasury Decisions Under the Customs, Internal Revenue, Industrial Alcohol, Narcotic and Other Laws, Volume 97. U.S. Government Printing Office.
- Moore, Capt. John (1984). Jane's Fighting Ships 1984-85. Jane's Information Group. ISBN 978-0710607959.
- Saunders, Stephen (2009). Jane's Fighting Ships 2009-2010. Jane's Information Group. ISBN 978-0710628886.
- Fairplay International Shipping Journal Volume 222. United Kingdom: Fairplay Publishing Limited. 1967.
