= USS Centaurus (AKA-17) =

Cargo ship of the United States Navy

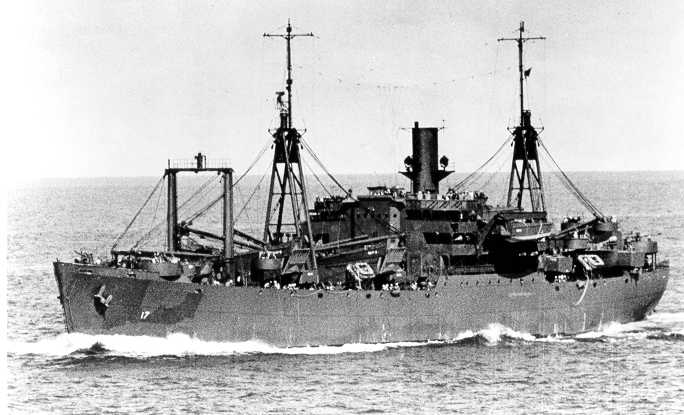
- USS Centaurus (AKA-17)

History

United States
- Name: USS Centaurus
- Namesake: The constellation Centaurus
- Builder: Federal Shipbuilding and Drydock Company, Kearny, New Jersey
- Launched: 3 September 1943
- Commissioned: 21 October 1943
- Decommissioned: 30 April 1946
- Honors and awards: 6 battle stars
- Fate: Returned to the Maritime Commission, 11 September 1946

General characteristics
- Class & type: Andromeda-class attack cargo ship
- Displacement: 6,556 long tons (6,661 t)
- Length: 459 ft 3 in (139.98 m)
- Beam: 63 ft (19 m)
- Draft: 26 ft 4 in (8.03 m)
- Speed: 16 knots (30 km/h; 18 mph)
- Complement: 247
- Armament: 1 × 5"/38 caliber dual purpose gun

USS Centaurus (AKA-17) was an Andromeda-class attack cargo ship named after the constellation Centaurus. She was one of a handful of World War II AKAs manned by officers and crew from the United States Coast Guard. She served as a commissioned ship for 2 years and 6 months.

Centaurus was launched on 3 September 1943 by Federal Shipbuilding and Drydock Company, Kearny, New Jersey, under a Maritime Commission contract; sponsored by Mrs. J. L. Wilson; acquired by the Navy 20 October 1943; and commissioned the next day.

== Service history ==
=== 1943–1944 ===
Centaurus put to sea from Norfolk, Virginia on 11 December 1943 with cargo for Pearl Harbor, where she arrived 30 December. On 22 January 1944, she cleared with the Southern Attack Force, bound for Kwajalein Atoll in the Marshall Islands, off which she arrived 31 January. During the initial assault, she landed four waves of cargo-laden craft under the protective fire of Pennsylvania (BB-38) with a smoothness belying her newness at amphibious warfare, and until 5 February she remained off the atoll landing combat cargo to support troops ashore as they encountered stiffening opposition. She returned to Noumea for training and cargo duty until 31 March, when she sailed from Tulagi to carry men and cargo to Manus and proceeded to Langemak Bay, New Guinea. Here she loaded for the landings on northern New Guinea, and on 15 April put to sea in the second assault echelon for Aitape. While her landings here on 23 April were unopposed, difficult surf and beach conditions challenged her skill. After several brief voyages to other New Guinea ports to transport reinforcements to the Hollandia area, Centaurus sailed for amphibious exercises in the Solomon Islands.

From 3 June to 30 June 1944, she was at sea as part of the reserve force standing by during the invasion of the Marianas, and then returned to Eniwetok to prepare for the return of U.S. forces to Guam. She sailed on 17 July in the Southern Attack Force for this assault, and on 21 July, the day of the initial attack, began landing combat cargo on the difficult beaches near Agat, where the Japanese army offered stiff resistance. She completed offloading cargo and vehicles, and embarking casualties, a week later, when she cleared for Eniwetok.

After a brief overhaul at Espiritu Santo, Centaurus sailed to Guadalcanal to embark cargo and vehicles for the assault on the Palau Islands, for which she cleared 8 September. At Peleliu on 15 September 1944, she began landing her cargo as heavy opposition developed from the Japanese defenses, cleverly concealed. A fierce fight developed ashore for the Marines, and Centaurus remained off the island pouring ashore the equipment essential to the maintenance of the offensive. Taking on board casualties and prisoners of war, she also carried Marines when she cleared on 4 October for the Russell Islands, where all passengers were disembarked. She continued on to San Francisco, where from 25 October to 22 December she was in overhaul.

=== 1945–1946 ===
Centaurus returned to the Pacific by way of Guam, and after rehearsal landings in the Solomons, joined the Northern Attack Force for the invasion of Okinawa, with which she sailed from Ulithi 27 March 1945. Arriving off the island for the assault on 1 April, she began to discharge cargo at an ever-quickening pace, as she supported the first rapid advances of the 6th Marines across the island. Operations went smoothly despite heavy kamikaze attacks; her guns helped splash two. She cleared Okinawa 9 April for Pearl Harbor, where she loaded additional cargo for the Okinawa operation. Returning to Okinawa 3 June, she offloaded, and on 14 June sailed for mainland United States via Pearl Harbor, and between 19 July and 23 August was in after overhaul at Seattle. She returned to the Far East and operated in the redeployment of troops.

On 31 January 1946, she returned to Seattle and thence to New York City, where she arrived on 23 March and was decommissioned 30 April 1946. She returned to the Maritime Commission 11 September 1946. On 24 February 1947, she was withdrawn from the Reserve Fleet and transferred to United States Lines.

Centaurus received six battle stars for World War II service
