= USS LST-484 =

1943 LST-1-class tank landing ship

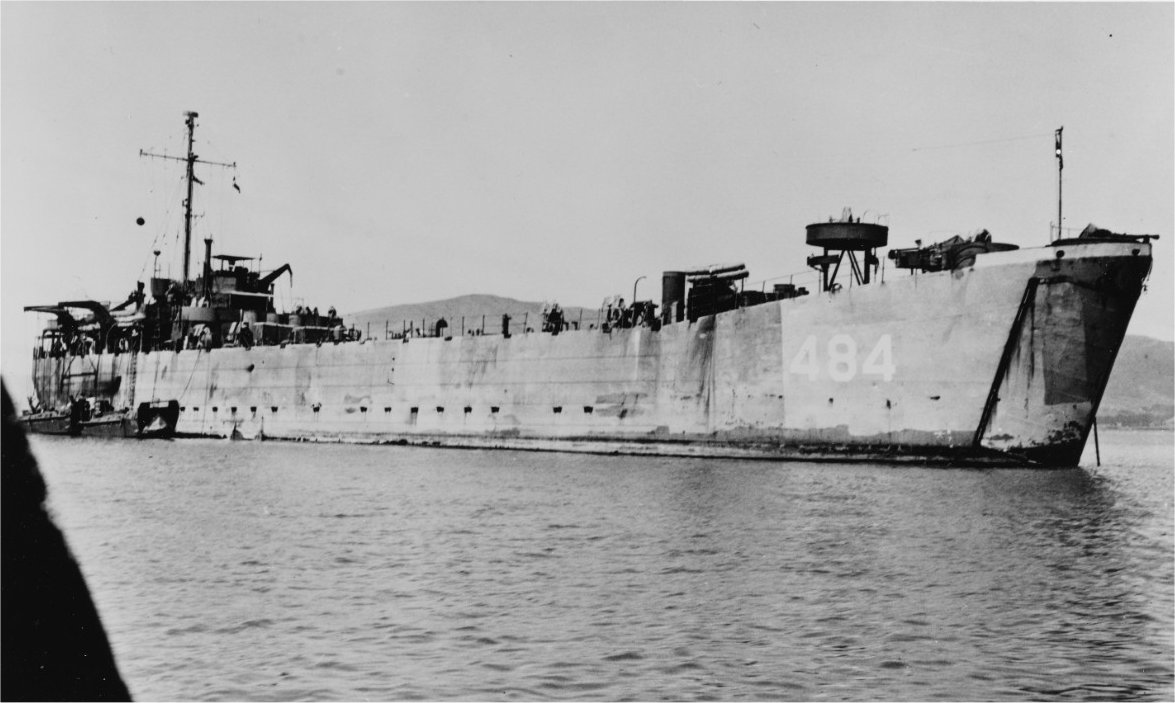
- USS LST-484, at anchor, location unknown, c. 1945–1946.

History

United States
- Name: LST-484
- Ordered: as a Type S3-M-K2 hull, MCE hull 1004
- Builder: Permanente Metals Corporation, Richmond, California
- Yard number: 39
- Laid down: 28 September 1942
- Launched: 2 January 1943
- Commissioned: 23 April 1943
- Decommissioned: 27 July 1946
- Stricken: 28 August 1946
- Identification: Hull symbol: LST-484; Code letters: NGVP
- Honors and awards: 5 × battle stars
- Fate: Sold for scrap, 13 December 1947

General characteristics
- Class & type: LST-1-class tank landing ship
- Displacement: 4,080 long tons (4,145 t) full load; 2,160 long tons (2,190 t) landing
- Length: 328 ft (100 m) oa
- Beam: 50 ft (15 m)
- Draft: Full load: 8 ft 2 in (2.49 m) forward; 14 ft 1 in (4.29 m) aft; Landing at 2,160 t: 3 ft 11 in (1.19 m) forward; 9 ft 10 in (3.00 m) aft
- Installed power: 2 × 900 hp (670 kW) Electro-Motive Diesel 12-567A diesel engines; 1,700 shp (1,300 kW)
- Propulsion: 1 × Falk main reduction gears; 2 × Propellers
- Speed: 12 kn (22 km/h; 14 mph)
- Range: 24,000 nmi (44,000 km; 28,000 mi) at 9 kn (17 km/h; 10 mph) while displacing 3,960 long tons (4,024 t)
- Boats & landing craft carried: 2 or 6 x LCVPs
- Capacity: 2,100 tons oceangoing maximum; 350 tons main deckload
- Troops: 16 officers, 147 enlisted men
- Complement: 13 officers, 104 enlisted men
- Armament: Varied, ultimate armament; 2 × twin 40 mm (1.57 in) Bofors guns; 4 × single 40 mm Bofors guns; 12 × 20 mm (0.79 in) Oerlikon cannons

Service record
- Part of: LST Flotilla 13
- Operations: Gilbert Islands operations (21 November–8 December 1943); Occupation of Kwajalein and Majuro Atolls (2–8 February 1944); Occupation of Eniwetok Atoll (19 February–2 March 1944); Capture and occupation of Saipan (15 June–30 July 1944); Assault and occupation of Okinawa Gunto (26 March–30 June 1945)
- Awards: American Campaign Medal; Asiatic–Pacific Campaign Medal; World War II Victory Medal; Navy Occupation Service Medal w/Asia Clasp

USS LST-484 was an LST-1-class tank landing ship built for the United States Navy during World War II. Like many of her class, she was not named and is properly referred to by her hull designation.

== Construction ==
LST-484 was laid down on 28 September 1942, under Maritime Commission (MARCOM) contract, MC hull 1004, by Kaiser Shipyards, Yard No. 4, Richmond, California; launched on 2 January 1943; and commissioned on 23 April 1943.

== Service history ==
During World War II, LST-484 was assigned to the Asiatic-Pacific Theater and participated in the following operations: Gilbert Islands operation November and December 1943; the Battle of Kwajalein in February 1944; the Battle of Eniwetok in February and March 1944; the Battle of Saipan June and July 1944; the Battle of Tinian in July 1944; and the Battle of Okinawa from March to June 1945.

== Post-war service ==
Following the war, LST-484 performed occupation duty in the Far East from 8 January 1946, until 20 February 1946. Upon her return to the United States, she was decommissioned on 27 July 1946, and struck from the Navy list on 28 August 1946. On 13 December 1947, she was sold to Kaiser Steel, Seattle, Washington, and subsequently scrapped.

== Awards ==
LST-484 earned five battle stars for World War II service.

== Bibliography ==
Online resources

- "LST-484". Dictionary of American Naval Fighting Ships. Naval History and Heritage Command. This article incorporates text from this source, which is in the public domain.
- "Kaiser Permanente No. 4, Richmond CA". www.ShipbuildingHistory.com. 5 February 2014.
- "USS LST-484". NavSource. 9 September 2016.
