= USS LST-227 =

LST-1-class landing ship tank

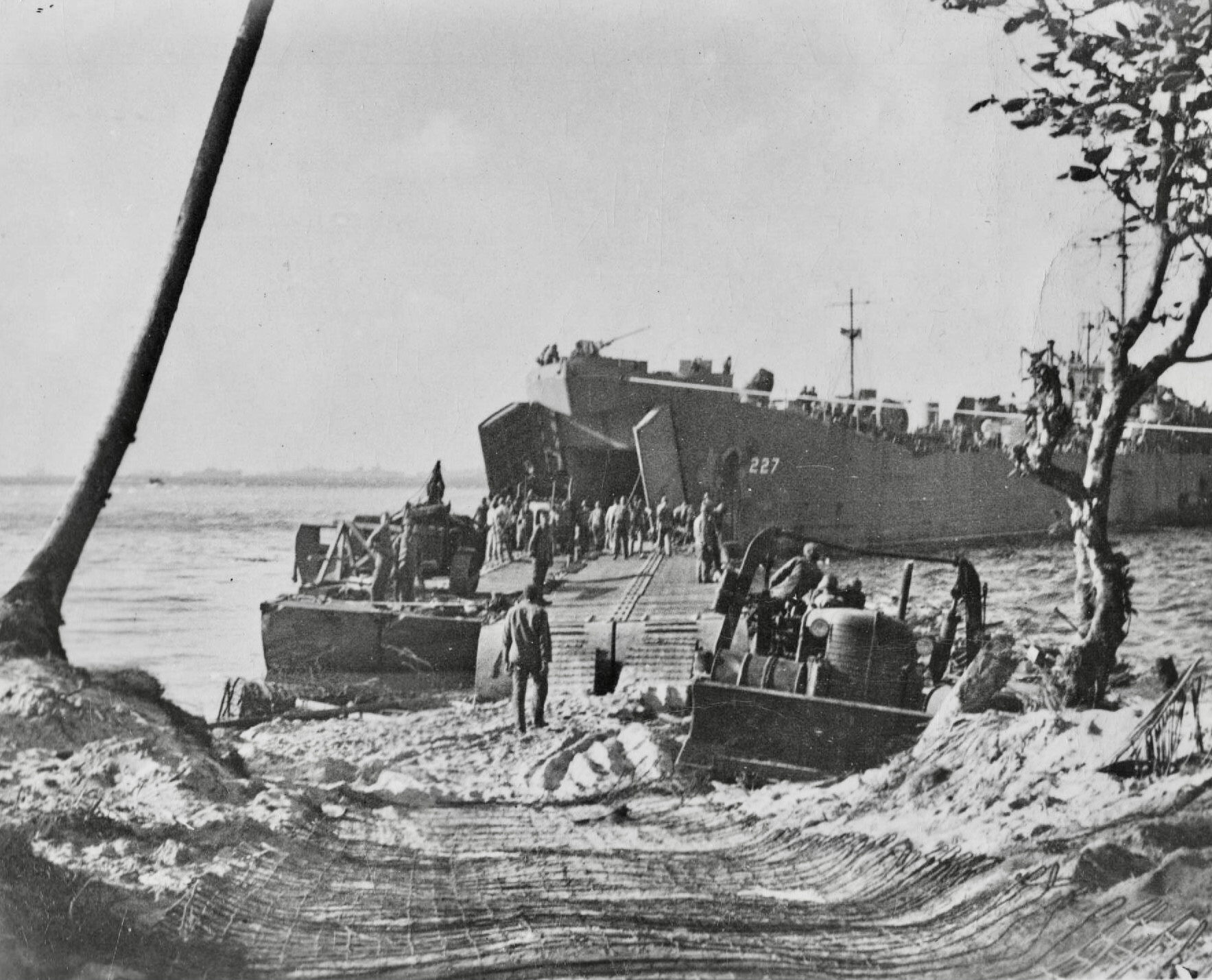
- USS LST-227

History

United States
- Name: LST-227
- Builder: Chicago Bridge and Iron Co., Seneca
- Laid down: 10 May 1943
- Launched: 21 September 1943
- Sponsored by: Mrs. C. B. Hellerson
- Commissioned: 16 October 1943
- Decommissioned: 22 January 1946
- Renamed: Q025, 23 January 1946
- Stricken: 28 April 1949
- Identification: Callsign: NZFB
- Honors and awards: See Awards
- Fate: Transferred to South Korea, 27 March 1955

History

South Korea
- Name: Deok Bong; (덕봉)
- Namesake: Deokbong
- Acquired: 29 March 1955
- Commissioned: 13 September 1955
- Decommissioned: 31 October 1989
- Reclassified: LST-672
- Identification: Pennant number: LST-808
- Fate: Unknown

General characteristics
- Class & type: LST-1-class tank landing ship
- Displacement: 4,080 long tons (4,145 t) full load; 2,160 long tons (2,190 t) landing
- Length: 328 ft (100 m) oa
- Beam: 50 ft (15 m)
- Draft: Full load: 8 ft 2 in (2.49 m) forward; 14 ft 1 in (4.29 m) aft; Landing at 2,160 t: 3 ft 11 in (1.19 m) forward; 9 ft 10 in (3.00 m) aft
- Installed power: 2 × 900 hp (670 kW) Electro-Motive Diesel 12-567A diesel engines; 1,700 shp (1,300 kW)
- Propulsion: 1 × Falk main reduction gears; 2 × Propellers
- Speed: 12 kn (22 km/h; 14 mph)
- Range: 24,000 nmi (44,000 km; 28,000 mi) at 9 kn (17 km/h; 10 mph) while displacing 3,960 long tons (4,024 t)
- Boats & landing craft carried: 2 or 6 x LCVPs
- Capacity: 2,100 tons oceangoing maximum; 350 tons main deckload
- Troops: 16 officers, 147 enlisted men
- Complement: 13 officers, 104 enlisted men
- Armament: Varied, ultimate armament; 2 × twin 40 mm (1.57 in) Bofors guns; 4 × single 40 mm Bofors guns; 12 × 20 mm (0.79 in) Oerlikon cannons

USS LST-227 was a LST-1-class tank landing ship in the United States Navy during World War II. She was later sold to South Korean Navy as ROKS Deok Bong (LST-808).

== Construction and career ==
LST-227 was laid down on 10 May 1943 at Chicago Bridge and Iron Co., Quincy, Massachusetts. Launched on 21 September 1943 and commissioned on 16 October 1943.

=== Service in the United States ===
During World War II, LST-227 was assigned to the Asiatic-Pacific theater. She took part in the occupation of Kwajalein and Majuro Atolls from 2 to 8 February 1944 and Battle of Hollandia from 12 to 28 April 1944. She participated in the Battle of Guam from 21 to 28 July 1944 and the capture and occupation of southern Palau Islands from 6 September to 14 October 1944.

In 1945, she took part in the Lingayen Gulf landings on 9 January and the Assault and occupation Battle of Okinawa from 1 April to 10 May. Throughout post-war year service, she was sent for occupation service in the Far East from 21 October to 25 November 1945 and 13 December 1945 to 13 January 1946.

LST-227 was decommissioned on 22 January 1946 and was assigned to Commander Naval Forces Far East (COMNAVFE) Shipping Control Authority for Japan (SCAJAP) from 23 January 1946 to 6 June 1950 in which she was designated Q025. She was put into the Pacific Reserve Fleet following the end of her service there and later loaned to South Korea.

She was struck from the Navy Register on 28 April 1949.

=== Service in South Korea ===
ROKS Deok Bong was acquired by the South Korean Navy on 29 March 1955 and was commissioned on 13 September 1955.

Later in the 1970s, she was designated as LST-672.

She was decommissioned on 31 October 1989 and her fate is unknown.

== Awards ==
LST-227 have earned the following awards:

- American Campaign Medal
- Asiatic-Pacific Campaign Medal (6 battle stars)
- World War II Victory Medal
- Navy Occupation Service Medal (with Asia clasp)
- Philippines Presidential Unit Citation
- Philippines Liberation Medal (1 award)

== Sources ==
- United States. Dept. of the Treasury (1962). Treasury Decisions Under the Customs, Internal Revenue, Industrial Alcohol, Narcotic and Other Laws, Volume 97. U.S. Government Printing Office.
- Moore, Capt. John (1984). Jane's Fighting Ships 1984-85. Jane's Information Group. ISBN 978-0710607959.
- Saunders, Stephen (2009). Jane's Fighting Ships 2009-2010. Jane's Information Group. ISBN 978-0710628886.
- Fairplay International Shipping Journal Volume 222. United Kingdom: Fairplay Publishing Limited. 1967.
