= Central Marianas naval order of battle =

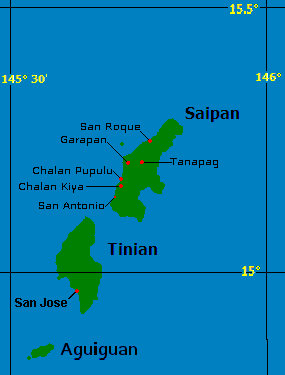
Saipan and Tinian in the Central Marianas

On 15 June 1944, United States Marine and Army forces landed on the southwest coast of the island of Saipan in the central Marianas chain. US forces declared Saipan secure on 9 July.

Marine Corps forces landed on the nearby island of Tinian on 24 July. Tinian was declared secure 1 August.

The naval forces involved can be summarized as follows:

- Combat ships: 7 escort carriers, 7 old battleships, 6 heavy cruisers, 5 light cruisers, 69 destroyers, 28 destroyer escorts
- 150+ amphibious landing and support ships
- 85+ auxiliaries

== Command structure ==
Theater and operational commanders

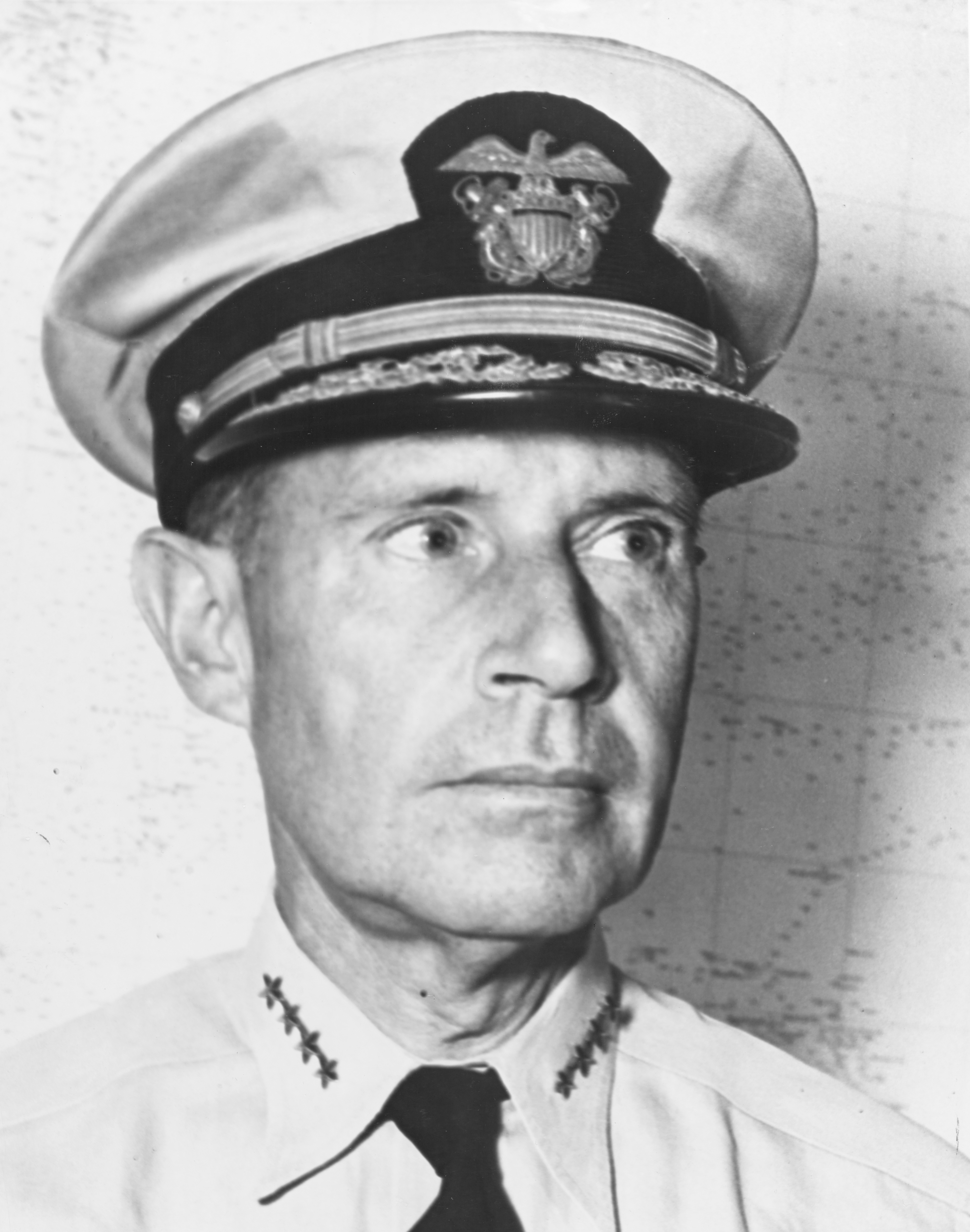
Vice Adm. Raymond A. Spruance

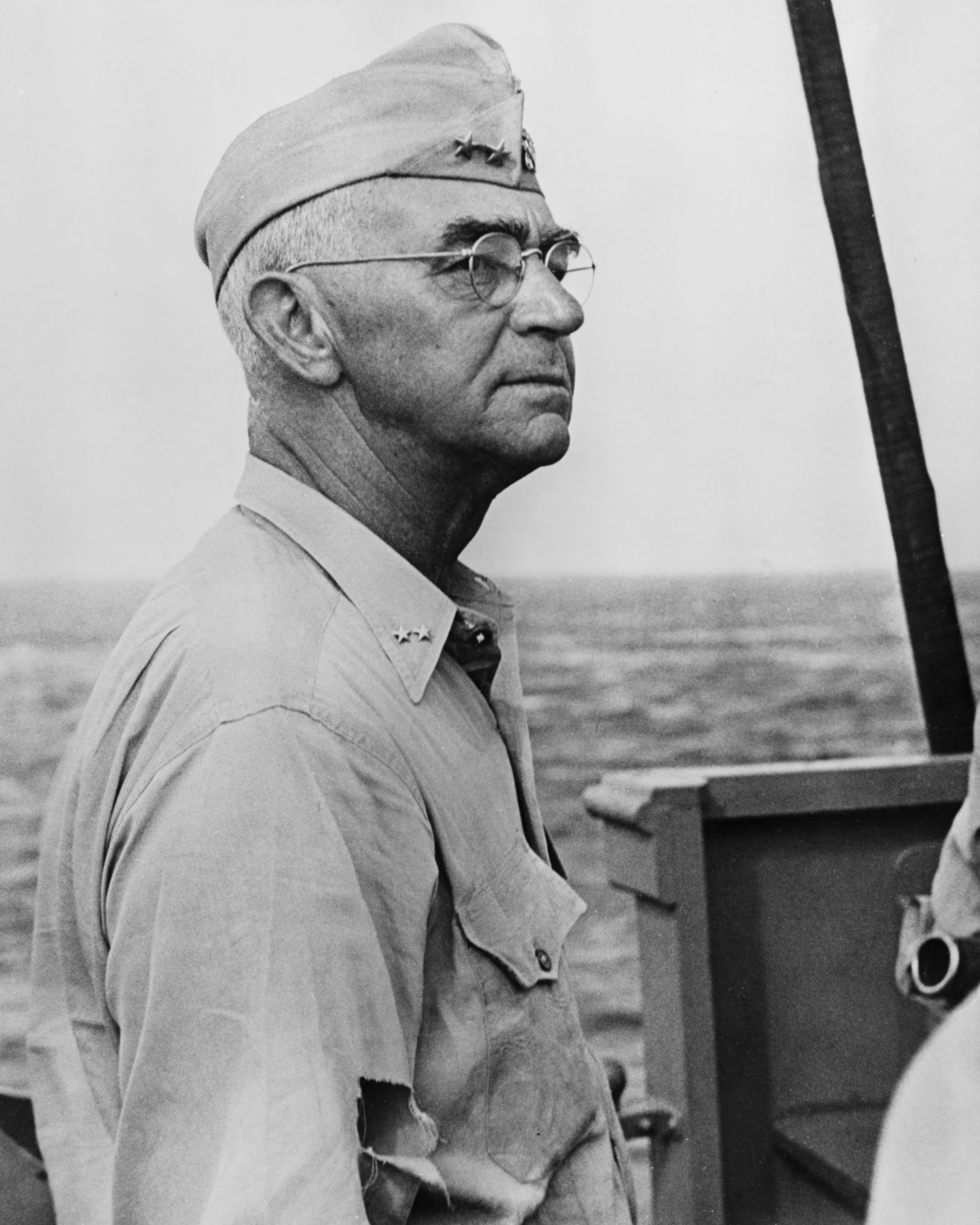
Rear Adm. Richmond Kelly Turner

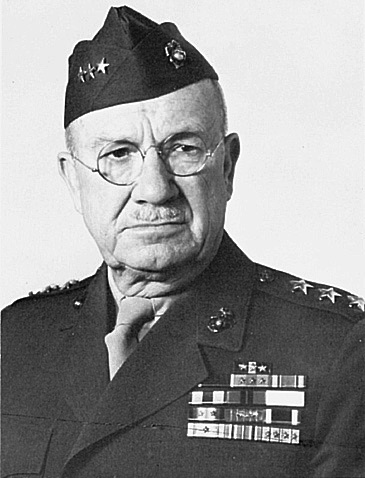
Maj. Gen. Holland M. Smith

Divisional commanders

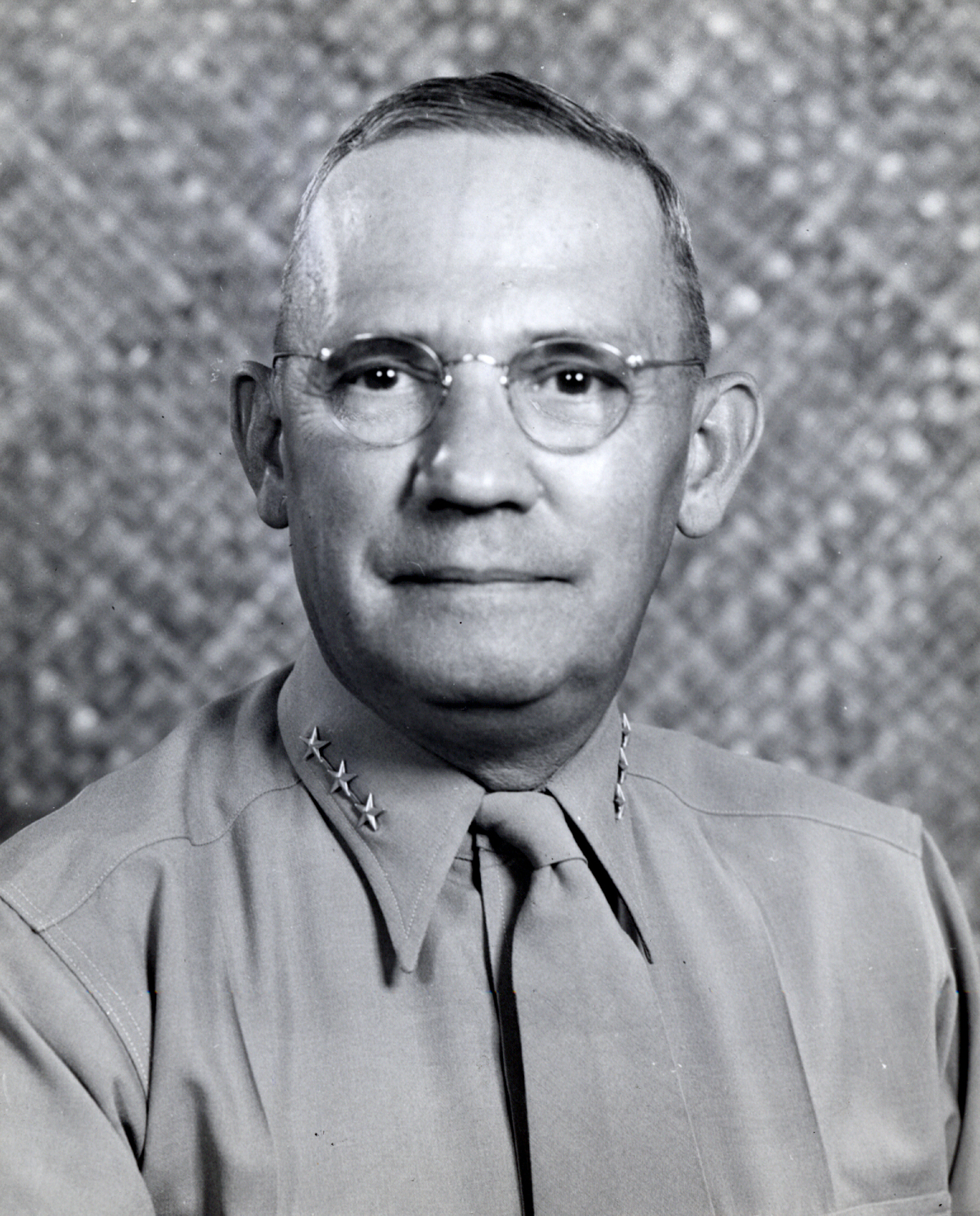
Maj. Gen. Thomas E. Watson, USMC

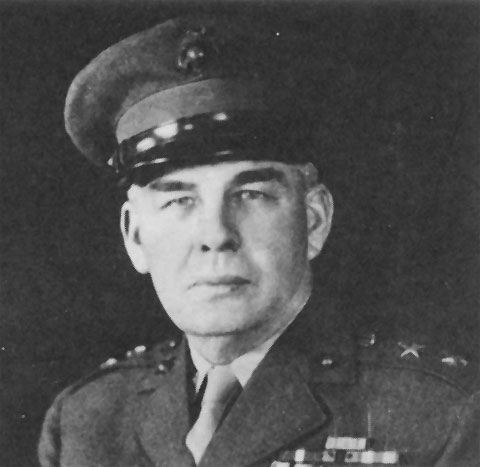
Maj. Gen. Harry Schmidt, USMC

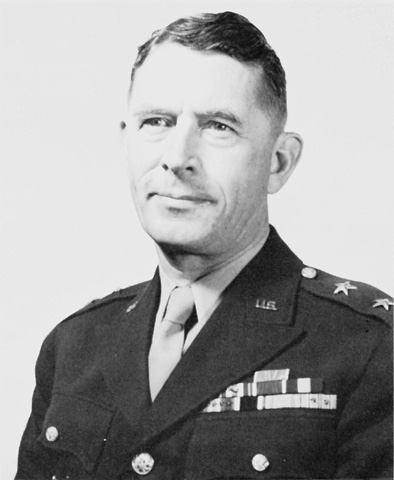
Maj. Gen. Ralph C. Smith, USA

The roles of Commander in Chief, Pacific Ocean Areas (CINCPOA) and Commander in Chief, U.S. Pacific Fleet (CINCPAC), were both exercised by Admiral Chester W. Nimitz from his headquarters at Pearl Harbor, Hawaii.

=== Theater and Operational Command ===
Since the Marianas lie in the Central Pacific, their capture was the responsibility of the U.S. Fifth Fleet, led by Vice Admiral Raymond A. Spruance from aboard his flagship, heavy cruiser Indianapolis.

The ships and embarked troops of Operation Forager were under direct operational command of Rear Admiral Richmond Kelly Turner aboard amphibious command ship Rocky Mount.

The Marine and Army landing forces for Operation Forager were under the command of Maj. Gen. Holland M. "Howlin' Mad" Smith, USMC. Smith directed the ground troops from aboard Vice Adm. Turner's flagship Rocky Mount until the afternoon of 17 June when he set up his command post ashore.

=== Ground Troops ===
V Amphibious Corps (Maj. Gen. Holland M. Smith, USMC)

Saipan: 2nd Marine Division (Maj. Gen. Thomas E. Watson)

4th Marine Division (Maj. Gen. Harry Schmidt)
27th Infantry Division (Army) (Maj. Gen. Ralph C. Smith)

Tinian: 2nd Marine Division (Maj. Gen. Thomas E. Watson)

4th Marine Division (Maj. Gen. Harry Schmidt)

== Forces afloat ==
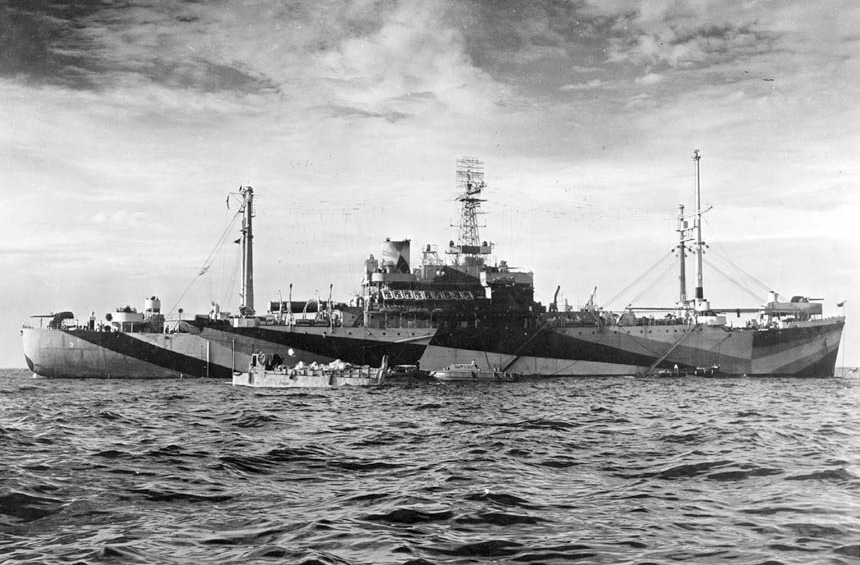
Vice Adm. Turner's flagship Rocky Mount

U.S. Fifth Fleet
Admiral Raymond A. Spruance in heavy cruiser Indianapolis

Joint Expeditionary Force (Task Force 51)
Vice Admiral Richmond Kelly Turner in amphibious command ship Rocky Mount

- Northern Attack Force (Task Force 52 – Saipan and Tinian)

Vice Admiral Turner

- Southern Attack Force (Task Force 53 – Guam)

Vice Admiral Richard L. Conolly in amphibious command ship Appalachian

=== Combat Task Groups ===
==== Carrier Support Group One (Task Group 52.14) ====
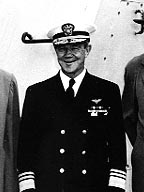
Gerald F. Bogan as a vice admiral

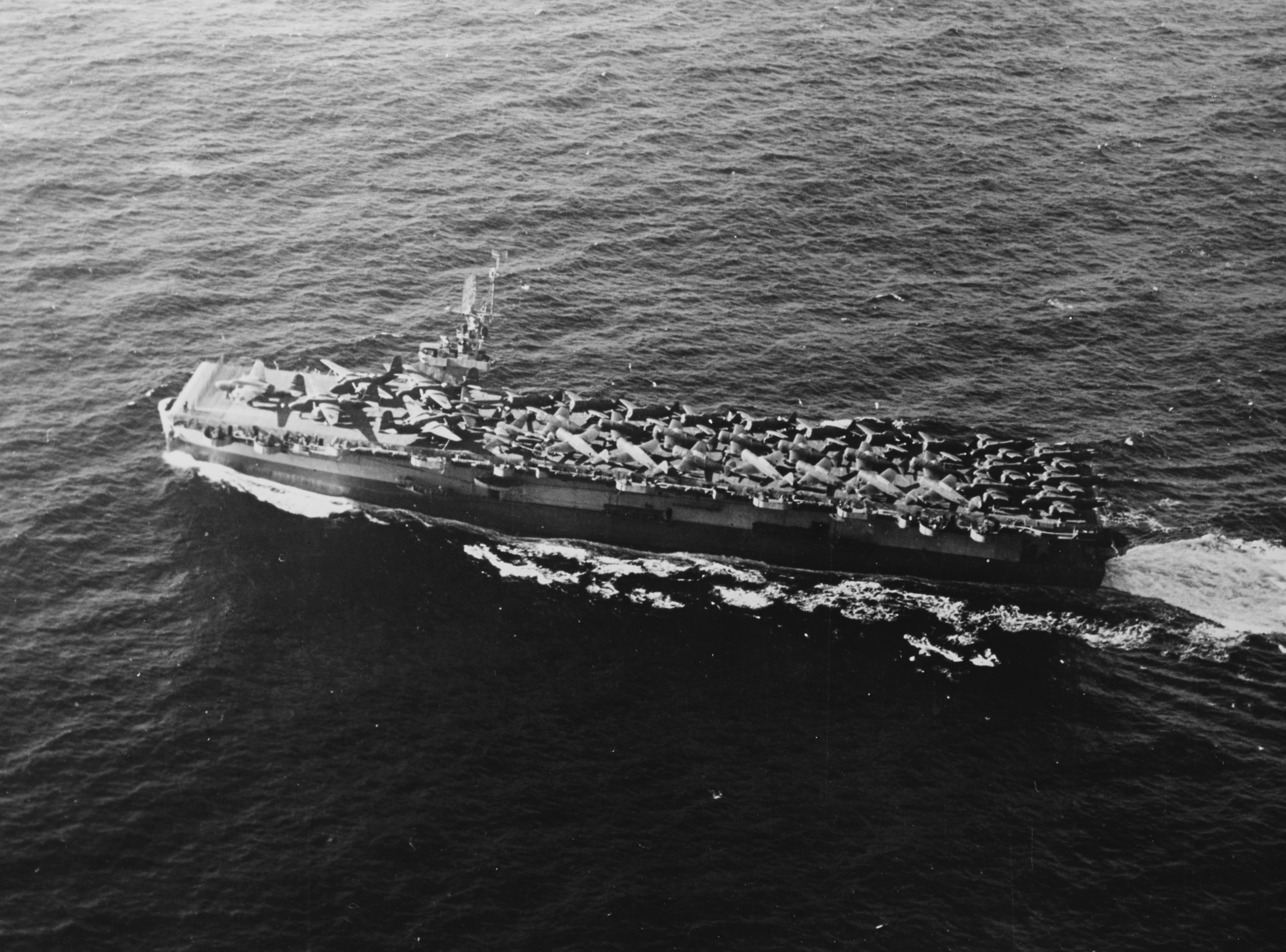
Escort carrier Fanshaw Bay

Rear Adm. Gerald F. Bogan

Unit 1 (Rear Adm. Bogan)

2 escort carriers

Fanshaw Bay (Capt. D.P. Johnson)

Composite Squadron 68 (Lt. Cmdr. R.S. Rogers):
16 FM-2 Wildcat fighters
12 TBM Avenger torpedo bombers

Midway (Note: Renamed St. Lo 10 October 1944, sunk during the Battle off Samar 20 October) (Capt. F.J. McKenna)

Composite Squadron 65 (Lt. Cmdr. R.M. Jones):
12 FM-2 Wildcat fighters
9 TBM Avenger torpedo bombers

3 destroyers (all Fletcher-class): Cassin Young, Irwin, Ross

Unit 2 (Capt. A.O. Weller)

2 escort carriers

White Plains (Capt. Weller)

Composite Squadron 4 (Lt. Cmdr. R.C. Evins (KIA)):
16 FM-2 Wildcat fighters
3 TBF, 9 TBM Avenger torpedo bombers

Kalinin Bay (Capt. C.R. Brown)

Composite Squadron 3 (Lt. Cmdr. W.H. Keighley):
14 FM-2 Wildcat fighters
9 TBM Avenger torpedo bombers

3 destroyers (all Fletcher-class): Porterfield, Callaghan, Longshaw

==== Carrier Support Group Two (Task Group 52.11) ====
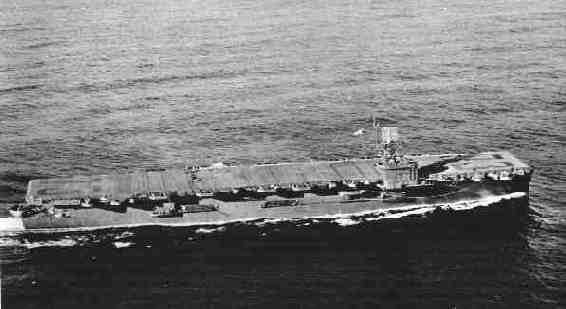
Escort carrier Gambier Bay

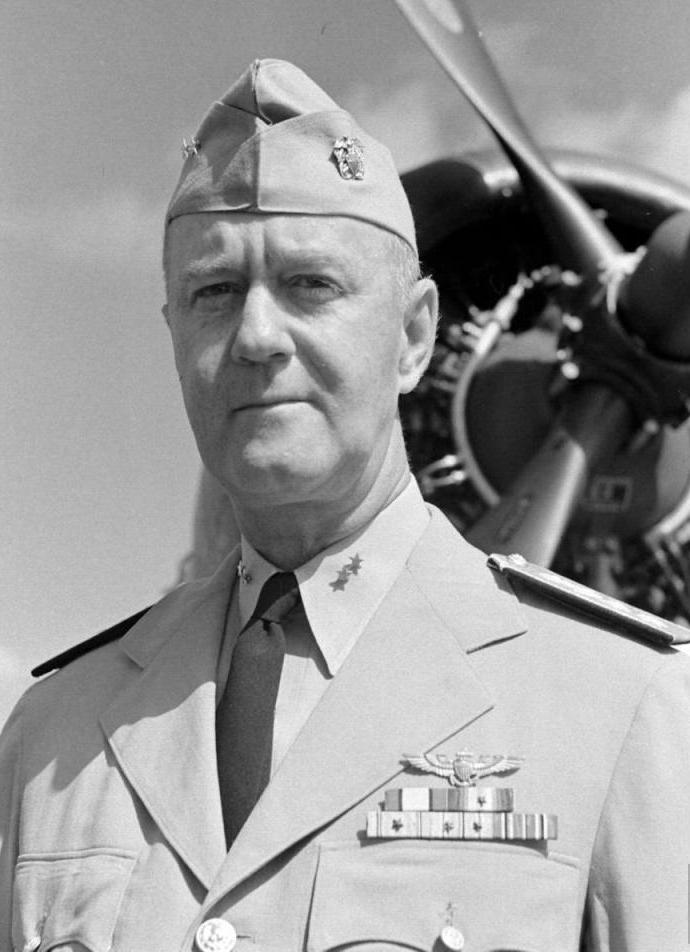
Rear Adm. Felix B. Stump

Rear Adm. H.B. Sallada

Unit 3 (Rear Adm. Sallada)

2 escort carriers

Kitkun Bay (Capt. J.P. Whitney)

Composite Squadron 5 (Cmdr. R.L. Fowler):
12 FM-2 Wildcat fighters
8 TBM Avenger torpedo bombers

Gambier Bay (Capt. H.H. Goodwin)

Composite Squadron 10 (Lt. Cmdr. E.J. Huxtable):
16 FM-2 Wildcat fighters
12 TBM Avenger torpedo bombers

3 destroyers (all Fletcher-class): Laws, Morrison, Benham

Unit 4 (Rear Adm. Felix B. Stump)

1 escort carrier

Nehenta Bay (Capt. H.B. Butterfield)

Composite Squadron 11 (Lt. Cmdr. O.B. Stanley):
12 FM-2 Wildcat fighters
9 TBM Avenger torpedo bombers

3 destroyers (all Fletcher-class): Bullard, Kidd, Chauncey

==== Fire Support Group One (Task Group 52.17) ====
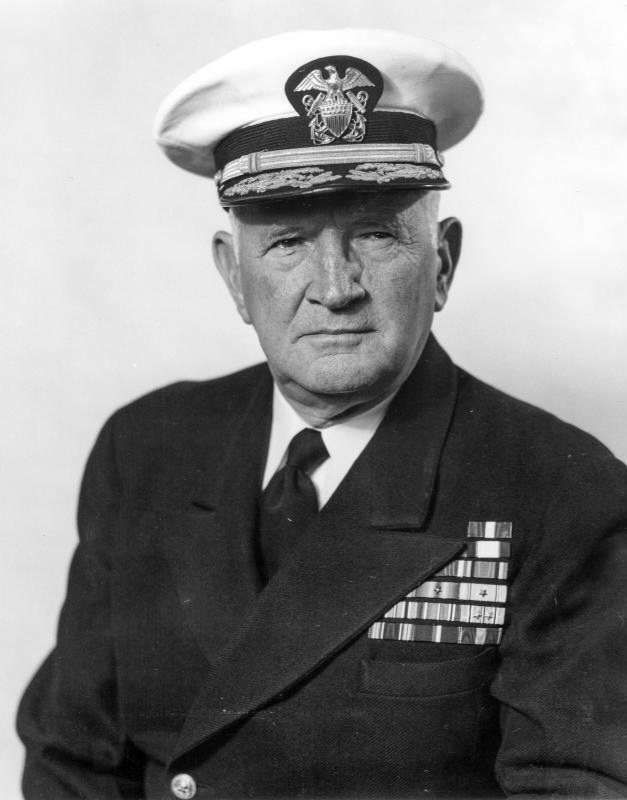
Rear Adm. Jesse B. Oldendorf

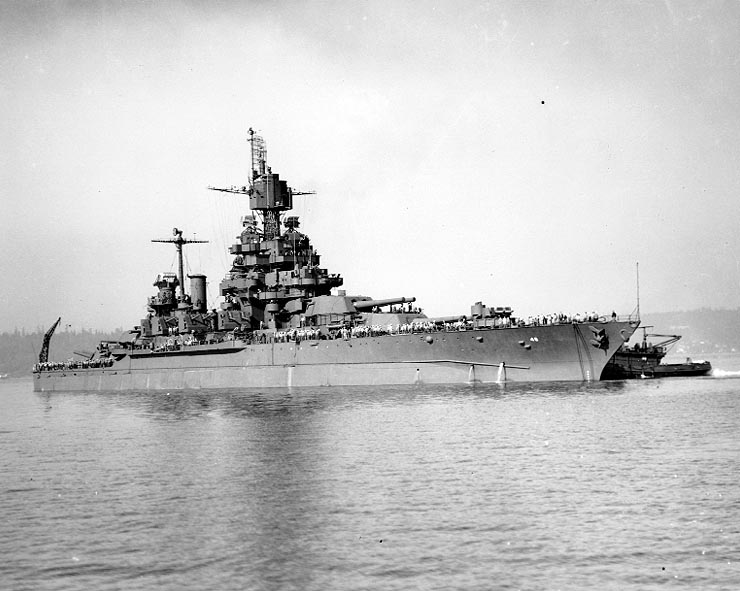
Battleship Maryland

Rear Adm. Jesse B. Oldendorf

Unit 1 (Rear Admiral Howard F. Kingman):

2 old battleships: Tennessee (Capt. A.D. Mayer), California (Capt. H.P. Burnett)
1 heavy cruiser: Indianapolis (Capt. E.R. Johnson)
1 light cruiser: Birmingham (Capt. T.B. Inglis)
4 destroyers (all Fletcher-class): Remey, Wadleigh, Norman Scott, Mertz

Unit 2 (Cmdr. P.H. Fitzgerald):

3 destroyers (2 Fletcher-class): Robinson, Albert W. Grant, (1 Benson-class): Bailey

Unit 3 (Capt. H.P. Jarrett):

3 destroyers (2 Fletcher-class): Halsey Powell, Monssen, (1 Benson-class): Coghlan

Unit 4 (Rear Adm. Oldendorf):

2 old battleships: Maryland (Rear Adm. T.D. Ruddock), Colorado (Capt. W. Granat)
1 heavy cruiser: Portland (Capt. S.H. Hurt)
4 destroyers (all Fletcher-class): McDermut, McGowan, McNair, Melvin

Unit 5 (Rear Adm. R.W. Hayler):

2 light cruisers: Montpelier (Capt. H.D. Hoffman), Cleveland (Capt. A.G. Shepard)
3 destroyers (all Fletcher-class): Yarnall, Twining, Stockham

==== Fire Support Group Two (Task Group 52.10) ====
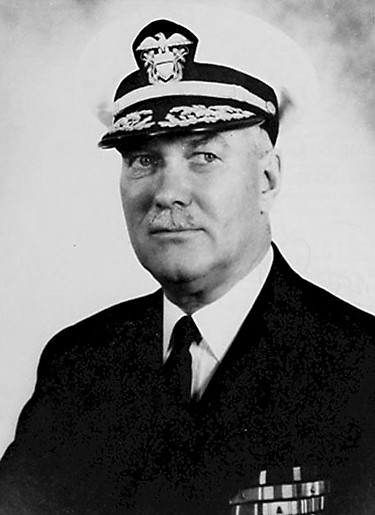
Rear Adm. Walden L. Ainsworth

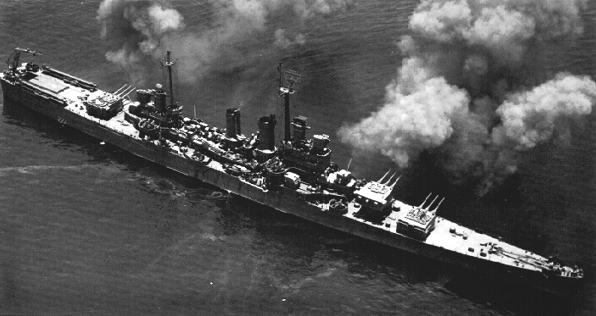
Heavy cruiser Wichita firing broadside

Rear Adm. Walden L. Ainsworth

Unit 6 (Rear Adm. Ainsworth)

2 old battleships: Pennsylvania (Capt. C.F. Martin), Idaho (Capt. H.D. Clarke)
1 light cruiser: Honolulu (Capt. H.R. Thurber)
3 destroyers (all Fletcher-class): Anthony, Wadsworth, Hudson
1 high-speed transport: Dickerson
1 high-speed minesweeper: Hogan
1 seaplane tender: Williamson

Unit 7 (Rear Adm. George L. Weyler)

1 old battleship: New Mexico (Capt. E.M. Zacharias)
2 heavy cruisers: Minneapolis (Capt. Harry Slocum), San Francisco (Capt. Harvey Overesch)
3 destroyers (all Fletcher-class): Halford, Terry, Braine
1 high-speed transport: Talbot
1 high-speed minesweeper: Stansbury

Unit 8 (Rear Adm. C. Turner Joy)

2 heavy cruisers: Wichita (Capt. J.J. Mahoney), New Orleans (Capt. J.E. Hurff)
1 light cruiser: St. Louis (Capt. R.H. Roberts)
3 destroyers (all Fletcher-class): Fullam, Guest, Bennett

=== Amphibious Operations Task Groups ===
==== Control Group (Task Group 52.6) ====
Commodore P.S. Theiss

14 submarine chasers
25 landing craft infantry
3 high-speed transports

==== Transport Group "Able" (Task Group 52.3) ====
Capt. H.B. Knowles
Embarking 2nd Marine Division

Transport Division 18 (Capt. Knowles)

2 attack transports: Monrovia, Frederick Funston
1 transport: War Hawk
1 attack cargo ship: Alcyone
1 landing ship dock: Lindenwald

Transport Division 10 (Capt. G.D. Morrison)

4 attack transports: Clay, Neville, Arthur Middleton, Feland
1 attack cargo ship: Alhena
2 cargo ship: Jupiter, Hercules

Transport Division 28 (Capt. H.C. Flanagan)

3 attack transports: Bolivar, Doyen, Sheridan
1 transport: Comet
1 attack cargo ship: Electra
1 landing ship dock: Oak Hill

==== Transport Group "Baker" (Task Group 52.4) ====
Capt. D.W. Loomis
Embarking 4th Marine Division

Transport Division 20 (Capt. Loomis)

3 attack transports: Leonard Wood, Pierce, James O'Hara
1 transport: La Salle
1 attack cargo ship: Thuban
1 landing ship dock: Ashland

Transport Division 26 (Capt. R.E. Hanson)

3 attack transports: Callaway, Sumter, Leon
1 transport: Storm King
1 attack cargo ship: Almaack
2 landing ship docks: White Marsh, Belle Grove

Transport Division 30 (Capt. C.A. Misson)

3 attack transports: Knox, Calvert, Fuller
2 transports: John Land, George F. Elliot
1 attack cargo ship: Bellatrix

==== Eastern Landing Group (Task Group 52.8) ====
Cmdr. C.J. McWhinnie
Embarking 1st Battalion, 2nd Marines (Note: This unit was originally meant to make a diversionary landing on Saipan's east coast, but this part of the operation was cancelled.)

Transport Division 12 (Cmdr. McWhinnie)

6 high-speed transports: Waters, Stringham, Goldsborough, Manley, Overton, Noa

==== Transport Screen (Task Group 52.12) ====
Capt. R.E. Libby

15 destroyers:

7 Fletcher-class: Newcomb, Bennion, Heywood L. Edwards, Bryant, Prichett, Cony, Renshaw
2 Porter-class: Phelps, Selfridge
1 Mahan-class: Conyngham
2 Bagley-class: Bagley, Patterson
1 Sampson-class: Shaw
2 Wickes-class: Philip, Mugford

1 high-speed transport: Kane
4 patrol craft escorts: 1396, 1404, 1457, 1460

==== Tractor Flotilla (Task Group 52.5) ====
Capt. A.J. Robertson

Tractor Group "Able" (Capt. J.S. Lillard)

Unit 1: 8 landing ship tanks
Unit 2: 8 landing ship tanks
"Able" Reserve: 6 landing ship tanks

Tractor Group "Baker" (Capt. Robertson)

Unit 3: 8 landing ship tanks
Unit 4: 8 landing ship tanks
"Baker" Reserve: 4 landing ship tanks
Support Artillery Group: 7 landing ship tanks

==== Minesweeping and Hydrographic Survey Group (Task Group 52.13) ====
Cmdr. R.S. Moore, USNR

Unit 1 (Cmdr. W.R. Loud)

4 high-speed minesweepers: Hopkins, Perry, Long, Hamilton

Unit 2 (Lt. Cmdr. H.L. Thompson)

4 high-speed minesweepers: Chandler, Zane, Palmer, Howard

Unit 3 (Cmdr. Moore)

3 minesweepers (all Auk-class): Chief, Champion, Herald

Unit 4 (Lt. Cmdr. J.R. Fels, USNR)

3 minesweepers (all Auk-class): Oracle, Motive, Heed

Units 5 & 6 and Mobile Hydrographic Unit

5 auxiliary motor minesweepers
2 landing craft, control
6 landing craft, vehicle

==== Joint Expeditionary Force Reserve (Task Group 51.1) ====
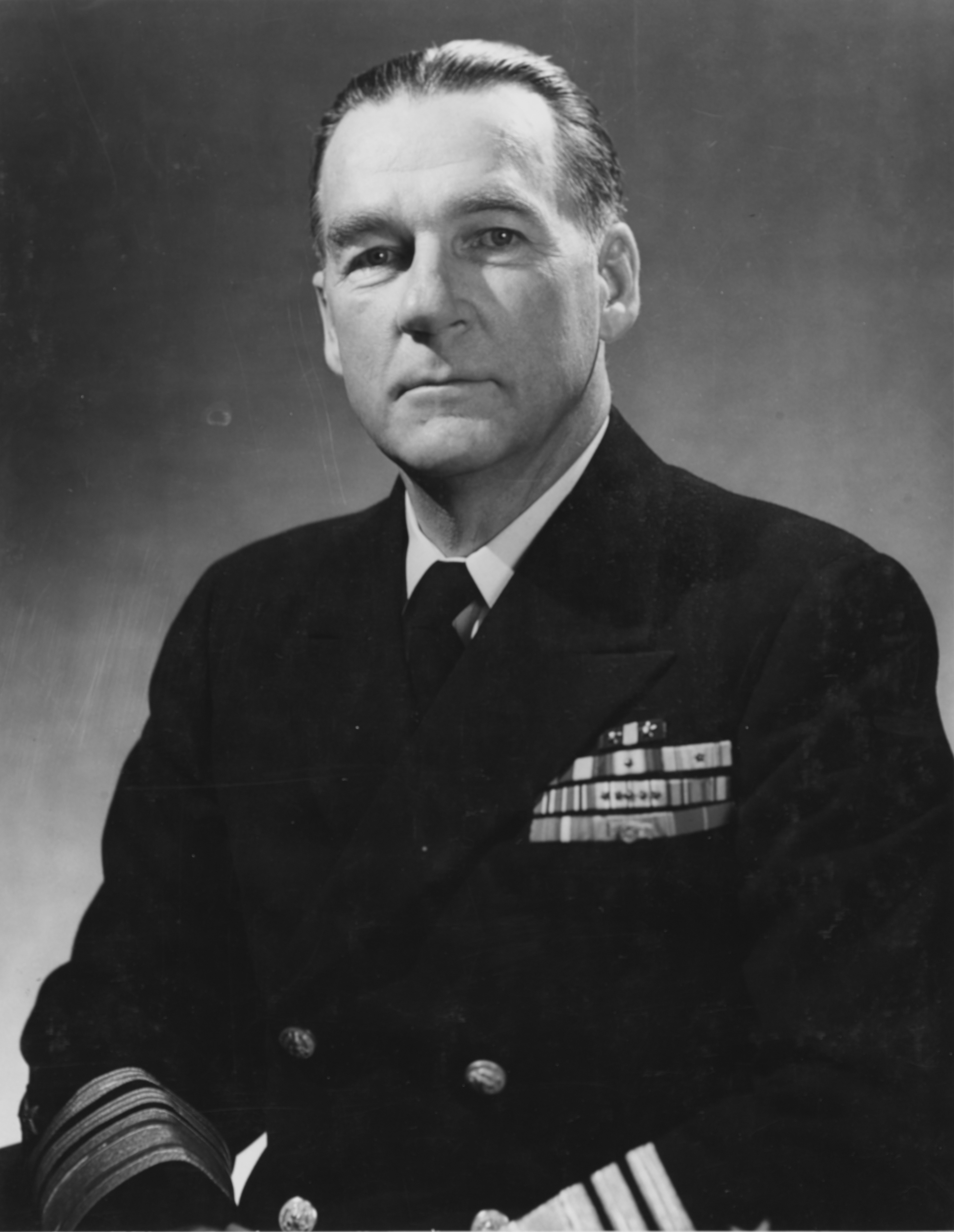
Rear Adm. William H.P. Blandy

Rear Adm. William H.P. Blandy
Embarking 27th Infantry Division (Army)

Transport Division 7 (Capt. C.G. Richardson)

3 attack transports: Cavalier, J. Franklin Bell, Heywood
1 transport: Winged Arrow
1 attack cargo ship: Fomalhaut

Transport Division 32 (Capt. M.O. Carlson)

3 attack transports: Fremont, Harris, Custer
1 transport: Herald of the Morning
1 cargo ship: Auriga
4 destroyers (all Fletcher-class): Waller, Pringle, Saufley, Sigourney
2 destroyer escorts (both Evarts-class): Sederstrom, Fleming
1 fleet tug: Chickasaw

Transport Division 34 (Capt. Charles Allen)

4 transports: Prince Georges, Kenmore, De Grasse, Livingston
1 cargo ship: Leonis
7 landing craft infantry

Screen (Cmdr. J.R. Phal)

2 destroyers (both Fletcher-class): Conway, Eaton
4 destroyer escorts (2 Evarts-class): Tisdale, Eisele, (2 Cannon-class) Baron, Acree
1 net layer: Mimosa
1 net cargo ship: Keokuk

=== Service and Support Units ===
==== Service and Salvage Group (Task Group 52.7) ====
Capt. S.E. Peck

1 net layers: Cinchona
3 fleet tugs: Tekesta, Tawasa, Molala
1 repair ship: Phaon
2 salvage vessels: Preserver, Clamp
1 seaplane tender: Ballard
1 landing craft repair ship: Agenor
8 auxiliary motor minesweepers

==== Fueling Group (Task Group 50.17) ====
Capt. Edward E. Paré

24 fleet oilers: Neshanic, Saugatuck, Saranac, Lackawanna, Monongahela, Neosho, Cimarron, Kaskaskia, Sabine, Caliente, Guadalupe, Platte, Pecos, Schuylkill, Tallulah, Ashtabula, Cahaba, Tappahannock, Kennebago, Marias, Suamico, Cache, Kankakee, Mascoma
8 destroyers (all Fletcher class): Paul Hamilton, Capps, John D. Henley, Hall, Evans, David W. Taylor, Halligan, Haraden
14 destroyer escorts

9 Cannon-class: Samuel S. Miles, Swearer, Bangust, Weaver, Riddle, Waterman, Lamons, Wesson, Hilbert
5 Evarts-class: Fair, Manlove, Mitchell, Whitman, Wileman

4 escort carriers: (Note: Carried replacement aircraft for frontline carriers) Copahee, Breton, Manila Bay, Natoma Bay
4 hospital ships: Relief, Solace, Bountiful, Samaritan

== Bibliography ==
- Morison, Samuel Eliot (1953). New Guinea and the Marianas, March 1944 – August 1944. History of United States Naval Operations in World War II. Vol. VIII. Boston: Little, Brown and Co. LCCN 53-7298.
- Rottman, Gordon (2004). Saipan & Tinian 1944: Piercing the Japanese Empire. Osprey Publishing. ISBN 1-84176-804-9.
