= DE24 =

DE24 may refer to:

- Delaware Route 24
- USS Whitman (DE-24), a World War II destroyer escort
- USS Breeman (DE-104), a World War II destroyer escort, sold in 1946 to Nationalist China and renamed ROCS Tai Chong (DE-24)
- DE24, a postcode district in Derby, England; see DE postcode area
