= G17 =

G17 may refer to:

- G17 Plus, a Serbian political party
- ARM Matamoros (G17), an Auk-class minesweeper of the Mexican Navy
- Bandy World Championship G-17, a sport competition
- County Route G17 (California)
- Glock 17, a firearm
- HMS Onslow (G17), an O-class destroyer of the Royal Navy
