= ARM Mariano Matamoros =

ARM Mariano Matamoros may refer to one of the following patrol vessels of the Mexican Navy:

- ARM Mariano Matamoros (G17), the former American Auk-class minesweeper USS Herald (AM-101); acquired by the Mexican Navy on 1 February 1973; converted to a survey ship; stricken before 1993
- ARM Mariano Matamoros (P117), the former American Auk-class minesweeper USS Sage (AM-111); acquired by the Mexican Navy on 4 November 1973 and renamed ARM Hermenegildo Galeana (C86); renamed ARM Mariano Matamoros (P117) to free name Hermenegildo Galeana for the former American Bronstein-class frigate USS Bronstein (FF-1037), acquired by the Mexican Navy in 1993
