= SS Sea Dolphin =

SS Sea Dolphin may refer to one of two Type C3-S-A2 ships built for the United States Maritime Commission by Ingalls Shipbuilding:

- SS Sea Dolphin (1943) (MC hull number 428), acquired by the United States Navy and converted to Bayfield-class attack transport USS Leon (APA-48); sold for commercial service in 1947; scrapped in 1971
- SS Sea Dolphin (1945) (MC hull number 882), delivered in April 1945; sold 1947; scrapped in 1973
