= USS Thuban =

Cargo ship of the United States Navy

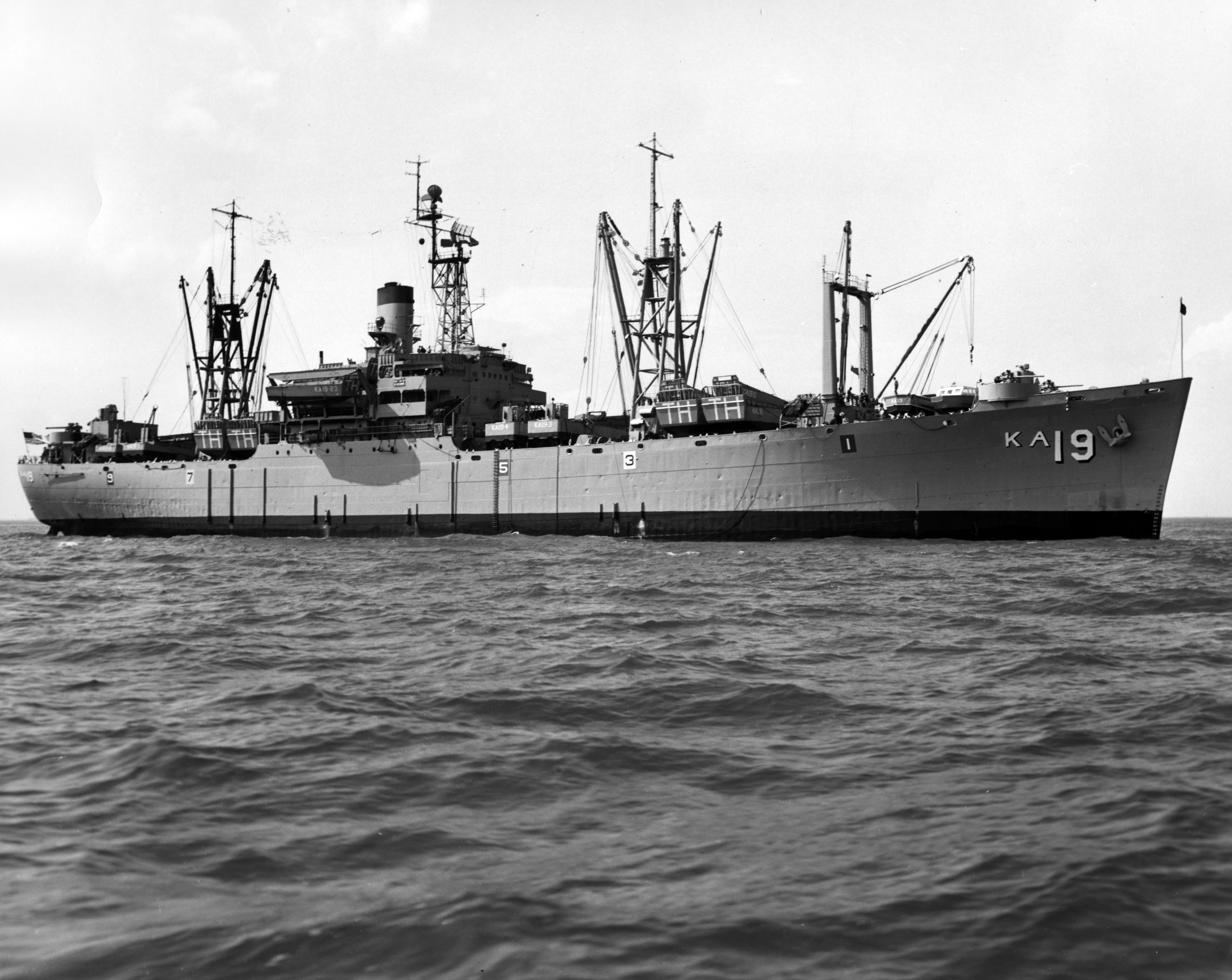

History

United States
- Name: USS Thuban
- Namesake: The star Thuban in the constellation Draco
- Builder: Federal Shipbuilding and Drydock Company, Kearny, New Jersey
- Laid down: 2 February 1943
- Launched: 26 April 1943
- Commissioned: 10 June 1943
- Decommissioned: October 1967
- Reclassified: LKA-19, 1 January 1969
- Stricken: 1 January 1977
- Honors and awards: 7 battle stars (World War II); 3 battle stars (Korea)
- Fate: Disposed of by MARAD, 27 September 1984

General characteristics
- Class & type: Andromeda-class attack cargo ship
- Displacement: 13,910 long tons (14,133 t) full load
- Length: 459 ft 3 in (139.98 m)
- Beam: 63 ft (19 m)
- Draft: 26 ft 4 in (8.03 m)
- Speed: 16.5 knots (30.6 km/h; 19.0 mph)
- Complement: 456
- Armament: 1 × 5"/38 caliber dual purpose gun; 4 × 3 in (76 mm) guns; 16 × 20 mm guns

USS Thuban (AKA-19/LKA-19) was an Andromeda-class attack cargo ship in service with the United States Navy from 1943 to 1967. The ship was scrapped in 1984.

== History ==
The ship was named after Thuban, the primary star in the constellation Draco, which was at one time the pole star and important in ancient Egyptian religion. USS Thuban served as a commissioned ship for 21 years and 3 months.

Thuban was laid down under a Maritime Commission contract (MC hull 203) on 2 February 1943 at Kearny, N.J., by the Federal Shipbuilding and Drydock Co.; launched on 26 April 1943; sponsored by Miss Madeleine Carroll; acquired by the Navy on 9 June 1943; and commissioned on 10 June 1943 at the Brooklyn Navy Yard.

=== Aleutian and Gilbert Islands, 1943 ===
On 23 June 1943, Thuban got underway from Gravesend Bay and anchored the next day in Hampton Roads. Following a week of tests and exercises, the new attack cargo ship, escorted by the destroyer Griswold (DE-7), departed Norfolk and steamed southward conducting intensive drills and exercises en route to the Panama Canal Zone. After transiting the Panama Canal on 5 July and 6 July, Thuban continued on independently to the California coast and arrived at San Diego on the 13th.

In the days that followed, she conducted landing craft exercises; and, on the 22nd, she arrived at Oakland to load cargo for the assault on Japanese-occupied islands in the Aleutian chain. On 5 August, she commenced exercises at Adak and on the 15th anchored off Quisling Cove, Kiska, to take part in what was expected to be an assault on a Japanese stronghold. However, the landing turned out to be unopposed. Thuban remained in the Aleutians until late in the month while American forces reoccupied the islands. She then steamed south, touched at San Francisco, and arrived at San Diego on 6 September.

On the 16th, the ship set her course for the Hawaiian Islands and arrived at Pearl Harbor on the 22nd. After loading cargo, she departed on 2 October, escorted by the destroyer Gamble (DM-15) and bound for the Ellice Islands. On the 8th, the attack cargo ship arrived at Funafuti to discharge her cargo; then continued on to anchor at Wellington Bay, New Zealand, on the 19th. There, she embarked elements of the 2nd Marine Division and participated in exercises in preparation for the coming assault on Tarawa. On 1 November, she got underway and on the 8th arrived at Efate, where, for two days, she conducted landing craft exercises in Meli Bay. On the 13th, she departed the New Hebrides to take part in "Operation Galvanic" – the conquest of the Gilbert Islands.

Before dawn on "D-Day," 20 November 1943, Thuban arrived at her assigned position in the transport area off Betio Island and began lowering boats and "amph-tracs" for the initial assault on Tarawa. All of her boats were in the water by 0435, and Thuban prepared to unload cargo. At 0551, as she maneuvered to maintain her station in the transport area, enemy shore batteries found the range of the transports, and a shell landed between Thuban and attack transport Doyen (APA-1). The transports quickly headed out to sea, beyond range of the shore batteries, but not before additional shells landed among them, providing many anxious moments.

Nightly air raids on the island, a reported periscope sighting, and bomb explosions on Betio marked the tense days that followed. Thuban continued unloading cargo and supplied fuel and repairs for her own boats and those of other ships. Thuban lost three men to enemy action during this operation, and four of her landing craft were sunk as they moved toward the beach. Shore parties sent her a number of casualties which taxed her limited medical facilities. Discharging cargo on call, Thuban remained off Betio until 27 November, when she departed the Gilberts in company with Task Group (TG) 53.8 and headed for the Hawaiian Islands.

After disembarking troops and equipment of the 2nd Marine Division at Hilo and Honolulu, Thuban embarked Army units. Then, operating out of Pearl Harbor, she conducted training exercises in Maalaea Bay, Maui, into the new year to prepare for the conquest of the Marshall Islands.

=== Kwajalein, Saipan, and Leyte, 1944 ===
Attached to the 5th Amphibious Force, she departed Pearl Harbor on 21 January 1944 and arrived off Kwajalein on 31 January. At 0410 on 1 February, she began lowering and dispatching her landing craft, 18 of which took part in the initial landings on the islands of the atoll that day. For four days, she unloaded powder, projectiles, tanks, and other items as her boats supported landings on the islands of the atoll. Then, on the 6th, she began reloading troops and cargo.

During "Operation Flintlock", Thuban's boats were constantly busy; and, because of the nature of the seas and the beaches, the landing craft took a beating, often requiring repairs after only two trips. On the 7th, while receiving fuel from Thuban, destroyer Sigsbee (DD-502) tore a 2-foot-long (0.61 m) hole in the cargo ship's starboard plating. Thuban effected repairs, put to sea the next day, and headed for Hawaii with destroyer Colahan (DD-658) in tow.

Off Oahu on the 19th, she transferred the destroyer to a tug and entered Pearl Harbor to discharge equipment, cargo, and troops. The next day, she delivered landing craft to the amphibious training base at Kauai and departed the Hawaiian Islands. She moored at San Diego on the morning of the 29th and, during March and April, participated in extensive training operations off the coast of southern California. On 1 May, she departed San Francisco to rejoin the 5th Amphibious Force, encountered foul weather and mountainous seas during the passage to Hawaii, and arrived at Pearl Harbor on the 6th. Through the remainder of May, she conducted rehearsals for coming amphibious operations.

On the 18th, she loaded cargo and troops of the 4th Marine Division and, on the 29th, got underway with TG 52.15 bound via Eniwetok for the assault on the Marianas. Late on the 14th, she approached Saipan. In the dark predawn on the 15th, exploding star shells lighted the sky on Thuban's port beam. Ships of the screen reported the sinking of a submarine as Thuban steamed around the northern tip of the island and headed south, sighting Saipan for the first time at 0445. Before sunrise, she lay to in the transport area and began lowering her boats. As the first assault waves hit the beach in the faint light of early dawn, Thuban's crew enjoyed a grandstand view of "D-day" on Saipan, especially of the shoreline south of Charankanoa where her own landing craft were operating.

Late that day, as the transports commenced night retirement, a group of seven Japanese dive bombers attacked. One plane dropped a bomb near a destroyer some 3,000 yards (2,700 m) off Thuban's starboard bow, but an eruption of anti-aircraft fire from Thuban and her sister ships of the transport group drove the attackers away. Numerous alarms sounded during the night, and Thuban helped to repel two additional raids.

In the days that followed, Thuban continued to unload her vital cargo to supply the forces on shore, furnished ammunition for light cruiser Montpelier (CL-57), and took on casualties from Marine and Army units on the beach, occasionally approaching within less than a mile of the shore. Despite frequent air alerts, the attack cargo ship was soon remaining in the transport area unloading through the night. Toward midnight on the night of 22 June and 23 June, a shell from an enemy battery on Tinian passed low over the number three hatch and burst nearby on the port beam, but Thuban escaped damage. All hands remained at battle stations during the night as Thuban took on casualties, made smoke, and continued unloading.

On the 26th, Thuban completed discharging her cargo. During air attacks that night, an enemy plane dropped a stick of bombs 2,000 yards (1,800 m) from Thuban, and a low-flying Japanese aircraft crashed the superstructure of the cargo ship Mercury (AK-42) off Thuban's port beam before plunging into the water. That same night, a surprise Japanese counterattack on shore left large numbers of wounded near Garapan requiring evacuation. Anchored off Susupe Point on the morning of the 27th, Thuban embarked 91 injured men filling sick bay, the main deck, and many quarters areas to overflowing with stretcher cases. The attack cargo ship's crew assisted in bathing, bandaging, and feeding the wounded while the ship's one doctor and his assistants aided the most severely injured. On this hectic day, Thuban also fueled, watered, and provisioned various ships. That evening, as the ship made smoke during a prolonged period of air raids, phosphorescent bombs hit the beach near Susupe Point, and a bomb narrowly missed one of her landing craft in the process of transporting a load of wounded. Action continued after midnight as five bombs hit the beach 2,000 yards (1,800 m) from the ship's position.

Departing Saipan on the 28th, Thuban arrived at Eniwetok on 1 July and transferred her patients to ships better equipped to care for them. After fueling and loading ammunition urgently needed by American warships supporting the assault on the Marianas, Thuban departed the Marshalls on the 15th.

Returning to Saipan on the 19th, she provided fuel, water, and ammunition to ships of the Marianas invasion force, took on empty brass, and repaired landing craft. Early on the morning of the 24th, seven of her tank lighters took part in the initial landings on Tinian. On the 28th, Thuban got underway and steamed in convoy via Eniwetok to the Hawaiian Islands, arriving at Pearl Harbor on 10 August. There, following amphibious exercises off Maui, she embarked Army troops; rendezvoused with TG 33.3; and headed via the Marshalls for the Admiralty Islands, arriving at Manus on 3 October.

Assigned to Task Group 79.3 for the impending amphibious assault on Leyte, she departed Seeadler Harbor on 14 October in company with Transport Division 7 and rendezvoused with Attack Group Able. In the early hours of "A-day," 20 October, the formation fought the strong currents of the Surigao Strait and drove off a Japanese dive bomber before arriving in the outer transport area. While the battleships delivered a pre-assault bombardment, Thuban began lowering her boats. Throughout the morning, she unloaded cargo; and her landing craft joined the assault waves which raced to the beach. Although interrupted by calls to general quarters and the necessity to make smoke when an air attack was imminent, for three days she discharged a steady stream of vital ammunition, engineering equipment, trucks, trailers, and rations for the troops on shore. On the morning of the 21st, two enemy planes came in low, evading detection, and dropped bombs near the attack transport Custer (APA-40), 1,000 yards (900 m) astern of Thuban. On the 23rd, she unloaded the last of her cargo; departed the Philippines; and steamed via Manus to arrive at Oro Bay, New Guinea, on 4 November.

After loading personnel and equipment of the 11th Airborne Division, she departed New Guinea on the 11th and returned to Leyte Gulf a week later. Through the 22nd, she unloaded her cargo despite 37 calls to general quarters. During this period, a number of aerial dogfights occurred in her area and, although Thuban was not attacked directly, she helped to repel enemy raiders on four occasions. Her mission completed, she departed the Philippines on the 24th and anchored in Humboldt Bay on the 29th.

On 13 December, she continued on to Aitape Roads, Tamara Island. During the next two weeks, hampered by rolling treacherous surf and 10- to 15-foot (5 m) swells, she loaded cargo and equipment of the Army's 43rd Division Artillery. Thuban then joined Transport Division 7 during rehearsals for the impending Lingayen Gulf landings, embarked troops of the 43rd Artillery, and on 29 December 1944 departed New Guinea with Task Group 78.1, bound for the Philippines.

=== Lingayen and Iwo Jima, 1945 ===
The passage was marked by the sighting of an enemy aerial snooper and the sinking of a Japanese midget submarine by destroyer Taylor (DD-468) south of Apo Island. Early on 9 January 1945, the attack cargo ship entered Lingayen Gulf. No enemy opposed her approach; and, by 0900, her landing craft were in the water, and Thuban had begun to discharge her cargo. During a twilight air alert that day, enemy attackers dropped bombs nearby, and Thuban fired on a Japanese fighter plane. During the predawn darkness on 10 January, enemy torpedo boat attacks in the area prompted Thuban to establish a boat patrol to defend the ship against surprise attack. As Thuban made smoke during the ensuing morning twilight, a low flying Japanese plane made a strafing run on the ship. Despite its advantage of surprise, the raider made no hits but escaped before Thuban could open fire. As the ship unloaded the last of her cargo on the night of 11 January and 12 January, a Japanese plane splashed 500 yards (460 m) away off her starboard beam; and, as dawn approached, she narrowly avoided damage when two bombs fell only 200 yards (180 m) off her port quarter. Later in the day, she got underway and set a course southward.

As Thuban steamed toward Leyte Gulf on the morning of the 13th, a Japanese suicide plane attempted to glide-dive into the attack cargo ship. Despite heavy fire from Thuban, the kamikaze pressed the attack until the last possible moment, then banked to port and dove, crashing the bridge of the attack transport Zeilin (APA-3), 1,300 yards (1,200 m) away from Thuban.

Thuban anchored in Leyte Gulf on the 15th but got underway three days later, bound for the Schoutens, and arrived at Biak Island on the 22nd. After loading elements of the Army's 41st Division, she departed New Guinea on 2 February, paused briefly in Leyte Gulf, and arrived off Mindoro Island on the morning of the 9th. There she lowered her boats and began unloading which continued through the night as Allied mop-up operations on Mindoro reached completion. Underway on the 10th, she proceeded via Leyte and Ulithi to the Volcanos. Arriving at a point 70 miles (110 km) southeast of Iwo Jima in company with TG 12.6 on 9 March, she remained there until the morning of the 17th when she proceeded to the hard-won island and embarked tired, battered, but victorious Marine units. She weighed anchor on the 27th and reached Saipan on the 29th, where she loaded cargo of the 5th Marine Division Air Transport Group. She departed the Marianas on 14 April and steamed to the Hawaiian Islands where she discharged her cargo before continuing on to moor in San Francisco Bay on the 27th.

Following repairs, she loaded fleet issue stores at the Oakland Naval Supply depot and departed San Francisco Bay on 19 July 1945. She stopped at Ulithi on 4 August, rendezvoused with elements of Service Squadron 6 on the 8th, and throughout that month provisioned ships of the 3rd Fleet off the coast of Honshū as they awaited the occupation of Japan. After the formal surrender ceremony in Tokyo Bay, she continued to supply American ships, visiting anchorages on the Korean and China coasts into the new year.

=== Pacific, 1946–1950 ===
Transferred to the Naval Transportation Service early in 1946, she operated between the west coast of the United States and various Pacific island groups, including the Marianas and Japan, participating in occupation duties until the outbreak of the Korean War in the summer of 1950.

=== Korea, 1950 ===
After taking on Army cargo at Oakland, she departed the west coast early in August 1950 and arrived at Yokohama on the 29th to discharge her cargo and complete outfitting for her return to the role of attack cargo ship. After combat loading and embarking Army and Navy personnel, Thuban proceeded to Kobe and, on 11 September 1950, got underway with TG 90.2 bound for Operation "Chromite" – the assault on Inchon. En route to its destination, the task group encountered heavy seas as it skirted a typhoon; and Thuban was forced to fall behind to repair a hydraulic line carried away by rough seas. Repairs completed, Thuban rejoined the task group and, on the 15th, approached the outer transport area at Inchon. That day, her boats joined in the first assault waves; and, in the days that followed, the veteran attack cargo ship discharged personnel, cargo, and equipment in support of the invasion.

On the 20th, she departed Inchon to return to Yokohama. There, she loaded units of the 7th Division and on 29 September returned to Inchon. Early in October, she took on stores and troops at Yokosuka; then proceeded to Pusan for final staging for the scheduled Riwon landings. Underway on the 28th, she arrived at Iwon Ko on the following day. On the completion of her mission in this landing, she departed Riwon Ko on 6 November. Later that month, she carried elements of the Army's 3rd Division from Japan to Wonsan; then returned to Yokohama on the 21st. On the 23rd, she sailed for home and arrived at San Francisco on 7 December.

=== Atlantic, Caribbean, Mediterranean, 1952–1967 ===
Early in 1952, she returned to the east coast and took up her duties supplying the American Fleet in Atlantic and Caribbean waters. Throughout the 1950s, she continued the familiar round of east coast and Caribbean ports, varied by a voyage to Japan in 1953 and by participation in various fleet exercises in the Atlantic. While deployed in the Mediterranean in the fall of 1956, Thuban took part in extensive exercises. Increasing tension in the Middle East exploded into war on 30 October, and Thuban was called upon to evacuate American nationals from Egypt early in November. She embarked 1,500 evacuees at Alexandria and, on 5 November, departed that troubled port. After transferring her passengers at Suda Bay, she returned to exercises with the 6th Fleet.

She participated in NATO exercises in the Mediterranean in 1957 and in November returned to the east coast and routine peacetime operations. During the Cuban Missile Crisis in October 1962, she operated for two months in Caribbean waters supporting the American naval quarantine.

=== Decommissioning, 1967–1979 ===
Decommissioned in October 1967, Thuban was placed in the Atlantic Reserve Fleet and was berthed at Norfolk. On 1 January 1969, she was reclassified an amphibious cargo ship and redesignated LKA-19. She remained in the National Defense Reserve Fleet into October 1979.

Thuban received seven battle stars for World War II service and three for Korean War action.
