= USS Teak =

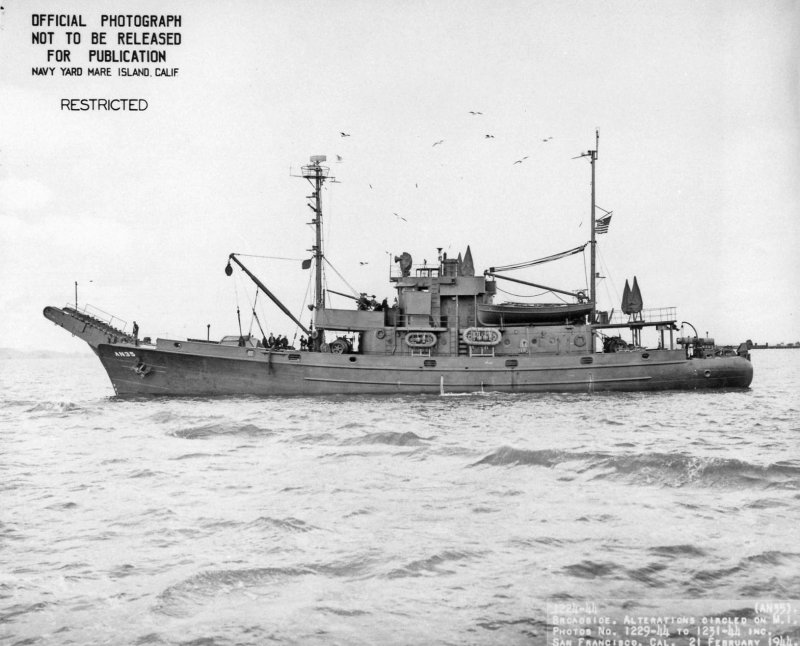

History

United States
- Name: USS Teak
- Namesake: A tall East Indian tree whose strong, hard wood is known for durability, as well as for insect and warp resistance. Teakwood is especially suited to shipbuilding.
- Builder: John H. Mathis & Company, Camden, New Jersey
- Laid down: 25 October 1940 as YN-30
- Launched: 7 July 1941
- Sponsored by: Mrs. E. L. Patch
- Commissioned: 10 December 1942 as USS Teak (YN-30) at Colon, Panama Canal Zone
- Recommissioned: 30 August 1946
- In service: 7 May 1942 as Teak (YN-30)
- Reclassified: AN-35, 30 January 1944
- Stricken: date unknown
- Home port: Tiburon, California; San Francisco, California
- Honors and awards: two battle stars and a portion of a Navy Unit Commendation
- Fate: Sold 1976

General characteristics
- Type: Aloe-class net laying ship
- Tonnage: 560 tons
- Displacement: 850 tons
- Length: 163 ft 2 in (49.73 m)
- Beam: 30 ft 6 in (9.30 m)
- Draft: 11 ft 8 in (3.56 m)
- Propulsion: diesel engine, single propeller
- Speed: 12.5 knots
- Complement: 48 officers and enlisted
- Armament: one single 3 in (76 mm) gun mount, four 20 mm guns

USS Teak (AN-35/YN-30) was an Aloe-class net laying ship which served with the U.S. Navy in the Pacific Ocean theatre of operations during World War II. She was assigned to serve the U.S. Pacific Fleet with her protective anti-submarine nets and earned two battle stars and other commendations for her bravery.

== Launched in Camden, New Jersey ==
Teak (YN-30) was laid down on 25 October 1940 at Camden, New Jersey, by John H. Mathis & Company; launched on 7 July 1941; sponsored by Mrs. E. L. Patch; placed in service on 7 May 1942; and commissioned on 10 December 1942 at Colon, Panama Canal Zone.

== World War II service ==
=== Coastal protection services ===
At the time of her commissioning, the net tender was assigned to the nets guarding the west gate of the Panama Canal. Teak transited the canal on 15 December 1942; departed Balboa on Christmas Eve; and arrived at San Francisco, California, on 6 January 1943. Based at Tiburon Naval Net Depot on West San Francisco Bay, she began tending the harbor's antisubmarine nets on the 10th.

Throughout 1943 and into 1944, Teak patrolled and maintained the nets which protected the anchorages and harbor of San Francisco Bay. She inspected the nets, repaired and replaced worn parts and buoys, and freed mooring anchors and an occasional ship fouled in the nets. These routine but vital duties were varied by repairs at Alameda, California, with gunnery drills in October, and with a voyage to San Pedro, California, in December.

=== South Pacific operations ===
Reclassified a net laying ship and redesignated AN-35 on 20 January 1944, Teak passed under the Golden Gate Bridge shortly before sunset on 2 March and set her course for the South Pacific Ocean. Proceeding via Samoa, she reached New Guinea on 4 April and began operating out of Milne Bay and the nearby Trobriand Islands. For the next six months, she provided towing services in nearby waters, carried cargoes, placed sonar buoys, and took up unneeded buoys and moorings.

Reassigned to the Leyte Gulf Service Unit of the U.S. 7th Fleet Service Force, she departed Humboldt Bay in convoy on 18 October and entered Leyte Gulf on the 24th. For the next few weeks, despite frequent calls to general quarters, she laid net moorings and marker buoys in Leyte Gulf, aided grounded small craft, and made tows.

In August the ship was chosen to be the surface support vessel for the U.S. effort to recover the silver that the Philippine Treasury dumped in Manila Bay when the Japanese arrived on Corregidor. U.S. Army and USN divers recovers millions of dollars of silver pesos on her decks into November 1945.

Late in November, she began sonar buoy station duties between Samar and Homohon Islands. On 17 January 1945, she returned to tending and laying moorings. In mid-March, she proceeded to Luzon and operated in Manila Bay, primarily occupied in raising submerged barges, sampans, diesel boats, and steamboats. During this period—while assigned to the Ship Salvage, Fire Fighting and Rescue Unit, Service Force, Pacific—she won the Navy Unit Commendation.

She remained in the Philippines until late in November, when she headed, via the Mariana Islands and Pearl Harbor, for the California coast and arrived at San Pedro, California on 4 January 1946. She was towed to Astoria, Oregon, by Mimosa (AN-26) in June and was decommissioned and placed in reserve on 30 August 1946. She was placed in custody of the U.S. Maritime Administration in June 1961, but remained under Navy ownership. Teak was sold to Levin Metals Corp., San Jose, California, on 16 March 1976.

== Honors and awards ==
Teak won two battle stars (Leyte operation and Manila Bay-Bicol operation) plus her share of the Navy Unit Commendation.
