= USS Mimosa =

History

United States
- Name: USS Mimosa
- Namesake: A flowering tree found in warm regions
- Builder: American Shipbuilding Company, Cleveland, Ohio
- Laid down: 15 October 1940 as Mimosa (YN-21)
- Launched: 15 March 1941
- Sponsored by: Miss Alin Woehrman
- Commissioned: 10 December 1942 as USS Mimosa (YN-21)
- Decommissioned: 27 December 1946, at Vancouver, Washington
- In service: 28 October 1941
- Reclassified: AN-26, 20 January 1944
- Stricken: date unknown
- Home port: Tiburon, California
- Honours and awards: two battle stars for World War II service
- Fate: Transferred to the U.S. Maritime Commission, 13 July 1961; scrapped at an unknown date

General characteristics
- Type: Aloe-class net laying ship
- Tonnage: 560 tons
- Displacement: 850 tons
- Length: 163 ft 2 in (49.73 m)
- Beam: 30 ft 6 in (9.30 m)
- Draft: 11 ft 8 in (3.56 m)
- Propulsion: direct drive diesel engine, single propeller
- Speed: 12.5 kn (23.2 km/h; 14.4 mph)
- Complement: 4 officers, 44 enlisted
- Armament: one single 3 in (76 mm) gun mount, three 20 mm guns, one y-gun

USS Mimosa (AN-26/YN-21) was an Aloe-class net laying ship which was assigned to serve the U.S. Navy during World War II with her protective anti-submarine nets.

== Built in Cleveland, Ohio ==
Mimosa (YN 21) was laid down 15 October 1940 by American Shipbuilding Company, Cleveland, Ohio, launched 15 March 1941, sponsored by Miss Alin Woehrman, and placed in service 28 October 1941.

== World War service ==
=== East coast operations ===
Exiting the Great Lakes via the Welland Canal and the St. Lawrence River, Mimosa proceeded by short sailings down the U.S. East Coast. At the end of the year, with the United States at war, she steamed from Jacksonville, Florida, to bolster the defenses of the high priority Panama Canal.

For over 2 years she maintained the net defenses at Coco Solo, Panama Canal Zone, and also installed submarine nets at Trujillo Bay, Honduras; Port Limon, Costa Rica; and Talora Bay, Peru. Mimosa commissioned 10 December 1942.

In January 1944, 1 1/2 years after she escaped a torpedo attack, Mimosa showed the effectiveness of the Navy's antisubmarine program to check the U-boat menace when she assisted in removing the nets along the Costa Rican and Honduran coasts. During this duty, the vessel was redesignated AN-26 on 20 January 1944.

=== Pacific Ocean operations ===
Transiting the Panama Canal 21 April 1944, she sailed for the Mariana Islands, arriving 20 June 1944 in the midst of the Battle of Saipan. First removing the Japanese defensive nets and wrecked ships, Mimosa labored until 9 September 1944 helping to install a new net system for harbors on Saipan and Tinian.

On 2 September 1945 as the war ended, Mimosa began removing the 6.5 miles (10.5 km) of nets she had tended. When the job was completed, she sailed 26 October 1945 for San Pedro, California, arriving 27 November 1945.

== Post-war deactivation ==
Following alterations, she departed San Pedro, California for Astoria, Oregon on 21 June 1946 with Teak (AN 35) in tow. Two months later Mimosa was herself towed from Portland, Oregon to Vancouver, Washington for inactivation. She was decommissioned 27 September 1946 and joined the Pacific Reserve Fleet.

On 13 July 1961 she was turned over to the U.S. Maritime Commission at Olympia, Washington and entered the National Defense Reserve Fleet there. She was eventually scrapped, but the date is unknown.

== Honors and awards ==
Mimosa (AN 26) received two battle stars for World War II service.
