= USS Wileman =

Evarts-class destroyer escort

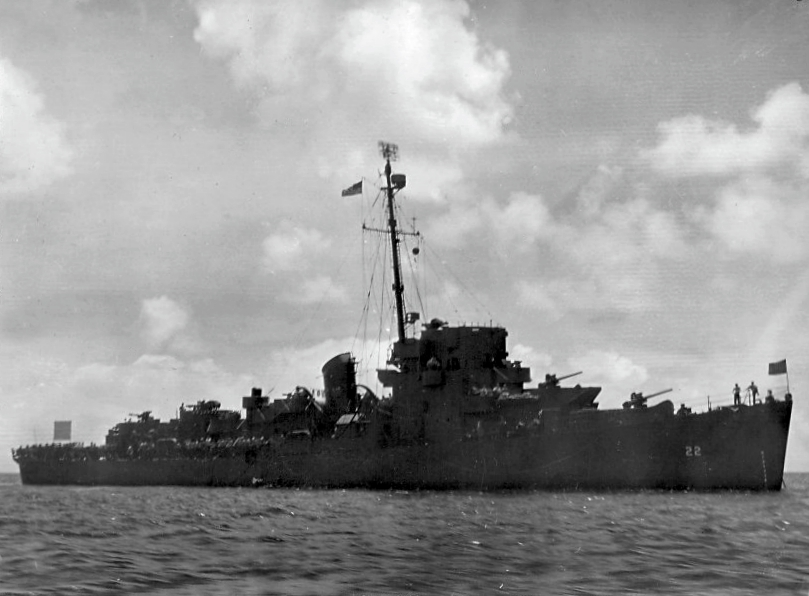

History

United States
- Name: USS Wileman
- Builder: Mare Island Navy Yard,
- Laid down: 30 April 1942, as BDE-22
- Launched: 19 December 1942
- Commissioned: 11 June 1943
- Decommissioned: 16 November 1945
- Renamed: USS Wileman, 19 February 1943
- Stricken: 28 November 1945
- Honors and awards: 4 battle stars (World War II)
- Fate: Sold for scrapping, 8 January 1947

General characteristics
- Type: Evarts-class destroyer escort
- Displacement: 1,140 long tons (1,158 t) standard; 1,430 long tons (1,453 t) full
- Length: 289 ft 5 in (88.21 m) o/a; 283 ft 6 in (86.41 m) w/l
- Beam: 35 ft (11 m)
- Draft: 11 ft (3.4 m) (max)
- Propulsion: 4 × General Motors Model 16-278A diesel engines with electric drive, 6,000 shp (4,474 kW); 2 screws
- Speed: 19 knots (35 km/h; 22 mph)
- Range: 4,150 nmi (7,690 km)
- Complement: 15 officers and 183 enlisted
- Armament: 3 × single 3"/50 Mk.22 dual purpose guns; 1 × quad 1.1"/75 Mk.2 AA gun; 9 × 20 mm Mk.4 AA guns; 1 × Hedgehog Projector Mk.10 (144 rounds); 8 × Mk.6 depth charge projectors; 2 × Mk.9 depth charge tracks

USS Wileman (DE-22) was an Evarts-class destroyer escort constructed for the United States Navy during World War II. It was promptly sent off into the Pacific Ocean to protect convoys and other ships from Japanese submarines and fighter aircraft. At the end of the war, she returned to the United States proudly displaying four battle stars.

== Design ==
The Evarts-class destroyer escorts were 289 ft 5 in (88.21 m) long overall, and they had a beam of 35 ft 2 in (10.72 m). They had an average draft of 10 ft 1 in (3.07 m) at their full load displacement of 1,416 long tons (1,439 t). Each ship had a normal crew numbered 156 officers and sailors.

Wileman was propelled by a pair of diesel motors manufactured by General Motors, which drove a pair of screw propellers. Her propulsion system was rated to produce 6,000 brake horsepower (4,500 kW) for a top speed of 19.5 knots (36.1 km/h; 22.4 mph). Oil storage amounted to between 131 and 197 long tons (133 and 200 t), which allowed a cruising radius of up to 6,000 nautical miles (11,000 km; 6,900 mi) at an economical pace of 10 knots (19 km/h; 12 mph).

The ship's armament consisted of a main battery of three 3-inch (76 mm) /50-caliber guns in individual pivot mounts, which could be used against air or surface targets. These were supported by a light anti-aircraft battery that initially consisted of four 1.1 in (28 mm) /75-caliber guns in a quadruple mount and nine 20 mm (0.79 in) Oerlikon guns. For attacks against submarines, the ship was equipped with a Hedgehog mortar, eight depth charge throwers, and two depth charge racks.

== Construction and commissioning ==
The ship was laid down on 30 April 1942 at the Mare Island Navy Yard, Vallejo, California, as BDE-22, a destroyer escort allocated to the United Kingdom under the Lend-Lease program. The ship was launched on 19 December 1942 and was sponsored by Mrs. Fred Yam. BDE-22 was reallocated to the United States Navy and redesignated DE-22 on 25 January 1942, and was renamed Wileman after William Wileman, a naval aviator killed during the Guadalcanal campaign. The ship was commissioned on 11 June 1943.

== World War II Pacific Theatre operations ==
Following shakedown along the U.S. West Coast, Wileman departed San Francisco, California, on 20 August in company with Fletcher (DD-445) and a three-ship convoy. The five ships arrived in Pearl Harbor on 27 August, but Wileman departed again a week later to escort Wharton (AP-7) on a voyage to the South Pacific. Ports of call during the cruise included Tutuila, Samoa; Nouméa, New Caledonia; and Suva in the Fiji Islands. Wharton and Wileman parted company at Suva.

The transport returned to San Francisco while the destroyer escort reported for a month of patrol and escort duty in the Ellice Islands. On 25 October, she departed the Ellice Islands to return to Oahu. The warship entered Pearl Harbor on 2 November and began preparations for her role in the upcoming Gilbert Islands invasion.

== Under attack by Japanese bombers ==
After about two weeks at Hawaii, Wileman stood out of Pearl Harbor as part of the screen of a convoy carrying garrison troops to the Gilberts. She reached Makin Island at midday on the 24th. As a greeting, the Japanese launched an air attack on Makin from nearby Jaluit and Mili. Three twin-engine "Betty" bombers picked out the Wileman convoy and attempted a torpedo attack. Wileman, the other destroyer escort, and the ships of the convoy themselves all went to general quarters and opened fire on the intruders. Their gunfire dissuaded two of the Japanese planes from pressing home their attack, and only the third succeeded in making his drop. Neither side, however, drew any blood during the encounter. The single torpedo passed wide of the entire convoy, and American anti-aircraft gunners brought down no Japanese planes.

After seeing her charges safely to Makin, Wileman began about a month of convoy escort and patrol duty between the islands of the Gilberts, Phoenix, and Ellice groups as part of the Americans' effort to consolidate their position in the Gilberts in preparation for the conquest of the Marshalls, the next hop in the Navy's leapfrog thrust through the Central Pacific toward Japan.

== Operation Flintlock support ==
On 8 January 1944, the destroyer escort returned to Pearl Harbor to prepare for her role in "Operation Flintlock", the Marshalls invasion. Twenty days later, she departed Oahu in the screen of a convoy bound for the Central Pacific. As in the case of the Gilberts operation, Wileman took no part in the actual assault phase of Operation Flintlock. Instead, she again escorted the ships carrying part of the garrison troops – the 16th Marine Defense Battalion and a Construction Battalion unit – for Kwajalein Atoll. The assault itself went forward just three days after Wileman left Pearl Harbor, and Kwajalein had been secured for three days when she reached the atoll on 10 February. The convoy entered the lagoon upon arrival, and Wileman began an uneventful 18 days on anti-submarine patrol in and around the atoll and later at Majuro. The warship departed the Marshalls on 28 February and reentered Pearl Harbor on 8 March.

After three weeks of gunnery drills and sonar exercises, Wileman left the Hawaiian Islands on 30 March in an antisubmarine hunter-killer task group built around Altamaha (CVE-18). The unit arrived in the eastern Marshalls at the end of the first week in April and began its search for Japanese submarines. The hunting proved less than good. During the voyage from Oahu, a plane from Altamaha claimed to have attacked an enemy submarine and took credit for a probable kill. While actually on patrol in the Marshalls, the group's only contact with the enemy almost proved to be a disaster.

== Japanese torpedo misses U.S. carrier ==
Just after sunset on 15 April, one of the ships in the screen sighted a torpedo heading straight for the carrier. Warned in time by voice radio, Altamaha maneuvered out of the torpedo's path, and it passed harmlessly ahead. The group failed to make contact with the torpedo's launcher – probably a submarine – and continued its patrol.

Later in the month, Wileman and her colleagues in the screen traded carriers with Task Group (TG) 11.2 and Altamaha headed back to Pearl Harbor with Coghlan (DD-606) and Preble (DM-20) while her former screen continued the patrol with Fanshaw Bay (CVE-70). Kalinin Bay (CVE-68) also joined the hunter-killer group just before the conclusion of the operation; but, despite the additional escort carrier, success eluded the unit. The task group concluded its patrol of the eastern Marshalls on 6 May and headed back to Pearl Harbor. The warships arrived at Oahu on 13 May, and the task group was dissolved.

== Marianas Campaign operations ==
Training exercises occupied the two weeks the destroyer escort spent at Pearl Harbor before her 27 May departure for the Central Pacific. Wileman entered the lagoon at Eniwetok on 4 June with her convoy of 11 oilers and one tanker. From there, she moved to Majuro, arriving on the 15th. For the opening phase of the Marianas campaign, Wileman again drew escort duty rather than participation in the actual assault. On 18 June, she left Majuro lagoon to escort transports to the anchorage off Saipan. Arriving there on 22 June, she departed again on the 26th to screen a task group back to Eniwetok. She reached the atoll on 30 June and remained in the area for three weeks.

Late in July, she put to sea with a group of oilers operating as a replenishment group for the Fast Carrier Task Force. For the next two months, she cruised between the Marianas and Eniwetok escorting convoys and replenishment groups in support of the Marianas campaign and the fast carrier sweeps of Japan's inner defense line and logistics routes. On 15 September, her duty in the forward area ended when she headed via Pearl Harbor to San Francisco where she arrived on 6 November.

== Duties at Pearl Harbor ==
Less than a week later, the destroyer escort put to sea to return to Oahu with a convoy of six LSM's and three merchant ships. The warship entered Pearl Harbor on 21 November and soon began intensive sound and gunnery training. During her stay in the Hawaiian Islands, she also served a tour as a school ship for gunnery officers and another as a target and adversary for Pacific Fleet submarines undergoing type training.

Wileman began 1945 with a round-trip voyage to Majuro, departing Pearl Harbor on 5 January and returning on the 21st. She remained at Oahu only briefly, getting underway again that same day for the west coast and an overhaul. She arrived at Terminal Island, California, on the 29th. She began repairs and modifications on the 31st and completed them in mid-April. On 19 April, the warship shaped a course back to Pearl Harbor, where she arrived on the 25th. There, she resumed duty as a school ship, again training gunnery personnel and acting as target ship and surface opponent for Pacific Fleet submarines. Later, she also served as escort and plane guard for Corregidor (CVE-58) and Tripoli (CVE-64) during air training operations conducted northeast of Oahu in June 1945.

== Return to Central Pacific operations ==
On 22 June, she stood out of Pearl Harbor to return to the Central Pacific. She arrived at Eniwetok on 30 June and began duty as a unit of the Marshalls and Gilberts Escort and Patrol Force (TG 96.3). For just over a month, she escorted convoys between Eniwetok and Ulithi and conducted antisubmarine patrols in the Marshalls. On 2 and 3 August, the destroyer escort voyaged to Kwajalein where she was assigned hunter-killer and air-sea rescue duty. While at Kwajalein, Wileman received word of the Japanese capitulation on 14 August.

However, the destroyer escort continued to operate with TG 96.3 until mid-September. On 14 September, she quit her Eniwetok-Kwajalein-Ulithi circuit and headed for home. She stopped overnight at Pearl Harbor on 20 and 21 September and then continued on to the U.S. West Coast. The warship arrived in San Pedro, Los Angeles, on 27 September.

== Post-War decommissioning ==
The destroyer escort was decommissioned on 16 November 1945 at Terminal Island, California, and her name was struck from the Navy List on 28 November 1945. In January 1947, she was sold to the Pacific Bridge Co. and was scrapped by that firm on 23 June 1947.

== Awards ==
- Combat Action Ribbon (retroactive)
- American Campaign Medal
- Asiatic-Pacific Campaign Medal (with four service stars)
- World War II Victory Medal
