= USS Prince Georges =

Cargo ship of the United States Navy

History

United States
- Name: Richard March Hoe
- Namesake: Richard March Hoe
- Owner: War Shipping Administration (WSA)
- Operator: Matson Navigation Company
- Ordered: as a Type EC2-S-C1 hull, MCE hull 426
- Builder: Permanente Metals Corporation, Richmond, California
- Yard number: 426
- Way number: 10
- Laid down: 20 September 1942
- Launched: 30 October 1942
- Sponsored by: Mrs. Patricia Montgomery
- In service: 9 November 1942
- Fate: transferred to the US Navy, 25 October 1943

United States
- Name: Prince Georges
- Namesake: Prince George's County, Maryland
- Acquired: 25 October 1943
- Commissioned: 10 November 1943
- Decommissioned: 12 April 1946
- Reclassified: Cargo Ship AK-224, 20 August 1944
- Stricken: 1 May 1946
- Identification: Hull symbol: AP-165 (1943–1944); Hull symbol: AK-224 (1944–1946); Code letters: NKWM
- Honors and awards: 1 × battle stars
- Fate: Sold for scrapping, 21 May 1969, delivered 10 November 1969

General characteristics
- Class & type: Crater-class cargo ship
- Displacement: 4,023 long tons (4,088 t) (standard); 14,550 long tons (14,780 t) (full load)
- Length: 441 ft 6 in (134.57 m)
- Beam: 56 ft 11 in (17.35 m)
- Draft: 28 ft 4 in (8.64 m)
- Installed power: 2 × Babcock & Wilcox header-type boilers, 220psi 450°; 2,500 shp (1,900 kW)
- Propulsion: 1 × General Machine Corp. vertical triple-expansion reciprocating steam engine; 1 × shaft
- Speed: 12.5 kn (23.2 km/h; 14.4 mph)
- Capacity: 7,800 t (7,700 long tons) DWT; 444,206 cu ft (12,578.5 m^{3}) (non-refrigerated)
- Troops: 1030 officers and enlisted (as AP)
- Complement: 256 officers and enlisted
- Armament: 1 × 5 in (127 mm)/38-caliber dual-purpose gun; 4 × 3 in (76 mm)/50-caliber dual-purpose gun

USS Prince Georges (AP-165/AK-224) was a Crater-class cargo ship in the service of the US Navy in World War II. Named after the Prince George's County, Maryland, it was the only ship of the Navy to bear this name.

== Construction ==
Prince Georges was laid down on 20 September 1942, as liberty ship SS Richard March Hoe, MCE hull 426, by Permanente Metals Corporation, Yard No. 2, Richmond, California, under a Maritime Commission (MARCOM) contract; launched on 30 October 1942, sponsored by Mrs. Patricia Montgomery; served the Army Transport Service (ATS) making runs to the Aleutian Islands with Army troops; acquired by the Navy under bareboat charter on 25 October 1943; and commissioned on 10 November 1943.

== Service history ==
On 16 December, Prince Georges departed Pearl Harbor on her first Navy operation, which took her to the bloody shores of Tarawa, where she spent Christmas 1943, and New Year's Day of 1944, before returning to Pearl Harbor. In February, she steamed from Pearl Harbor to disgorge men and material on Kwajalein Atoll, Makin Island and Abamama, Kiribati. After a return to Pearl Harbor, Prince Georges was back in the Gilberts and Marshalls in April. She participated, as part of TF 51, in her only invasion — Saipan, 20 to 25 June, returning to Pearl Harbor in July.

Reclassified AK–224, on 20 August 1944, Prince Georges departed Pearl Harbor again in early September, to back up the invasion of the Palaus, anchoring in Kossol Roads on 31 October. In December she delivered troops to Nouméa, then put into Auckland before heading north and west reaching the Solomons and Marianas in January 1945. She was employed as a troop carrier in the Central Pacific until June.

Returning to Pearl Harbor in June, she proceeded on to San Francisco. The end of the war found her back in Hawaii, whence she carried occupation troops to Saipan and Japan. Then reporting for "Magic-Carpet" duty, at the end of October, she steamed for the United States with a load of returning soon-to-be veterans, arriving Seattle on 10 November. She then proceeded to Okinawa on another "Magic-Carpet" run.

== Post-war decommissioning ==
Reaching San Francisco on 13 February 1946, she decommissioned and was returned simultaneously to the War Shipping Administration (WSA) on 12 April 1946 and was placed in the National Defense Reserve Fleet at Suisun Bay, California. Her name was struck from the Navy List on 1 May 1946.

Richard March Hoe was sold for scrapping on 21 May 1969, to United Minerals & Alloys Corporation, for $43,260.54. She was delivered 10 November 1969.

== Awards ==
Prince Georges received one battle star for World War II service.

== Notes ==
Citations

== Bibliography ==
Online resources

- "Prince Georges". Dictionary of American Naval Fighting Ships. Naval History and Heritage Command. 24 August 2015. This article incorporates text from this source, which is in the public domain.
- "Kaiser Permanente No. 2, Richmond CA". www.ShipbuildingHistory.com. 13 October 2010.
- "USS Prince Georges (AK-224)". NavSource. 6 September 2013.
- "RICHARD MARCH HOE". United States Department of Transportation. Archived from the original on December 12, 2019.
