= USS Fuller =

USS Fuller may refer to the following ships of the United States Navy:

- USS Fuller (DD-297), a destroyer commissioned in 1920 and wrecked in the Honda Point Disaster in 1923
- USS Fuller (AP-14), a transport commissioned in 1941 and decommissioned in 1946
