= USS Sederstrom =

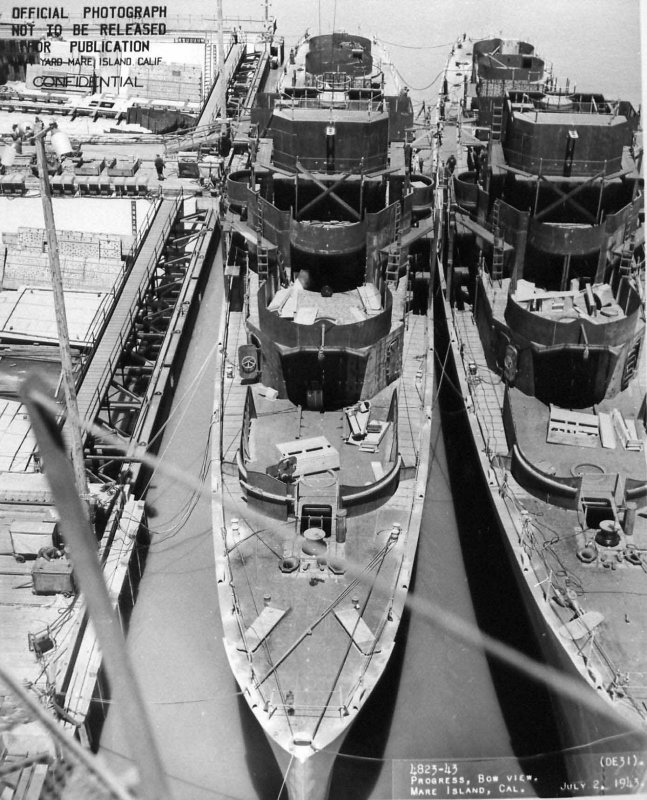

History

United States
- Name: USS Sederstrom
- Builder: Mare Island Navy Yard
- Laid down: 24 December 1942
- Launched: 15 June 1943
- Commissioned: 11 September 1943
- Decommissioned: 15 November 1945
- Stricken: 28 November 1945
- Honors and awards: 5 battle stars (World War II)
- Fate: Sold for scrapping, 24 November 1947

General characteristics
- Type: Evarts-class destroyer escort
- Displacement: 1,140 long tons (1,158 t) standard; 1,430 long tons (1,453 t) full
- Length: 289 ft 5 in (88.21 m) o/a; 283 ft 6 in (86.41 m) w/l
- Beam: 35 ft (11 m)
- Draft: 11 ft (3.4 m) (max)
- Propulsion: 4 × General Motors Model 16-278A diesel engines with electric drive, 6,000 shp (4,474 kW); 2 screws
- Speed: 19 knots (35 km/h; 22 mph)
- Range: 4,150 nmi (7,690 km)
- Complement: 15 officers and 183 enlisted
- Armament: 3 × single 3"/50 Mk.22 dual purpose guns; 1 × quad 1.1"/75 Mk.2 AA gun; 9 × 20 mm Mk.4 AA guns; 1 × Hedgehog Projector Mk.10 (144 rounds); 8 × Mk.6 depth charge projectors; 2 × Mk.9 depth charge tracks

USS Sederstrom (DE-31) was a Evarts-class destroyer escort of the United States Navy during World War II. She was promptly sent to the Pacific Ocean to escort convoys and to protect other ships from Japanese planes and submarines. Her assignments took her from one battle area to another, but she was fortunate in remaining almost unscathed by the end of the war. For her efforts in battle areas, she was awarded five battle stars by war's end.

== Design ==
The Evarts-class destroyer escorts were 289 ft 5 in (88.21 m) long overall, and they had a beam of 35 ft 2 in (10.72 m). They had an average draft of 10 ft 1 in (3.07 m) at their full load displacement of 1,416 long tons (1,439 t). Each ship had a normal crew numbered 156 officers and sailors.

Sederstrom was propelled by a pair of diesel motors manufactured by General Motors, which drove a pair of screw propellers. Her propulsion system was rated to produce 6,000 brake horsepower (4,500 kW) for a top speed of 19.5 knots (36.1 km/h; 22.4 mph). Oil storage amounted to between 131 and 197 long tons (133 and 200 t), which allowed a cruising radius of up to 6,000 nautical miles (11,000 km; 6,900 mi) at an economical pace of 10 knots (19 km/h; 12 mph).

The ship's armament consisted of a main battery of three 3-inch (76 mm) /50-caliber guns in individual pivot mounts, which could be used against air or surface targets. These were supported by a light anti-aircraft battery that initially consisted of four 1.1 in (28 mm) /75-caliber guns in a quadruple mount and nine 20 mm (0.79 in) Oerlikon guns. For attacks against submarines, the ship was equipped with a Hedgehog mortar, eight depth charge throwers, and two depth charge racks.

== Service history ==
Originally designated for transfer to the United Kingdom, Sederstrom was laid down as BDE-31 on 24 December 1942 at the Mare Island Navy Yard, Vallejo, California. She was instead redesignated for use by the United States Navy on 4 June 1943 and was launched as Gillette (DE-31) on 15 June 1943. The ship was renamed Sederstrom on 30 July 1943, after Verdi Sederstrom, a naval officer killed during the attack on Pearl Harbor. The ship was commissioned on 11 September 1943.

Following shakedown out of San Diego, California, Sederstrom, a unit of Escort Division (CortDiv) 31, commenced her escort career with a convoy run to Pearl Harbor. Arriving on 1 December, she participated in further training exercises and conducted inter-island escort runs for most of the month; then, on the 24th, the new destroyer escort got underway for the Gilberts as a unit of TU 16.25.9. Three days later, she was diverted to Funafuti, whence she escorted an AK (Navy cargo ship) and an LCT (Landing craft tank) as they delivered cargo to various islands in the Ellice Islands group. In mid-January 1944, she proceeded to Samoa for a run to the Wallis Islands after which she escorted merchant ships into the Gilberts. On 4 February, she delivered her charges to Makin; and, on the 5th, she departed for the Marshalls. From the 7th to the 25th, she patrolled the approaches to Kwajalein lagoon; then screened the transport, SS Prince Georges, back to the Gilberts and Hawaii.

Arriving at Pearl Harbor on 10 March, Sederstrom was underway again on the 25th with a convoy bound for Majuro. During April, she provided escort services in the Marshalls; and, in May, she returned to Pearl Harbor. On the 29th, she departed again to escort reserves of the Saipan invasion force into the Marianas. The force, Reserve Group 2, arrived off Saipan on 16 June, the day after the invasion, and cruised to the east of the island until after the battle of the Philippine Sea. On the 20th, the Army troops were landed south of Charan Kanoa; and, on the 22nd, Sederstrom got underway to escort LST's and LCI's back to Eniwetok.

On 16 July, the escort arrived back off Saipan. Screening and patrol duties occupied the next week; then, on the 24th, she shifted to Tinian to cover the initial landings and subsequent offloading there. On the 29th, she returned to Saipan; thence continued on to Eniwetok, providing plane guard services for Midway (CVE-63). On 10 August, she returned to the Marianas for brief duty in the Guam Patrol and Escort Group, serving as flagship of the group when ComCortDiv 31, embarked in Sederstrom, assumed command of the group. On the 22nd, however, she departed the Marianas again and returned to Pearl Harbor for navy yard repairs.

On 8 October, Sederstrom resumed her escort mission. Initially screening a Pearl Harbor-Ulithi convoy, she spent the period November 1944 to mid-February 1945 screening naval auxiliaries, escort carriers, and merchant ships between Eniwetok and Ulithi. In late February, she made a run into the Marianas; and, in March, she escorted reinforcements and supplies to Iwo Jima. From the 5th to the 11th, she patrolled off that island; and, on the 12th, she joined TU 51.29.19 and returned to Ulithi to stage for the Okinawa campaign.

On 21 March, Sederstrom departed the Western Carolines for the Ryūkyūs in the screen of the escort carriers of Support Carrier Unit 1 and arrived off the southern tip of Okinawa early on the afternoon of the 24th. For the next three weeks, she screened and provided plane guard services for the CVE's (escort carriers) as they supported the landings on Kerama Retto and on Okinawa. By mid-April, however, Japanese aerial resistance, particularly the kamikazes, had taken enough of a toll among the destroyer types providing anti-submarine and anti-aircraft screens for the beachhead area to necessitate replacements, and Sederstrom was reassigned to this duty. On the 22nd, she was targeted by a kamikaze, but her anti-aircraft guns damaged the plane sufficiently to cause it to crash into the water about 10 feet off the starboard bow. Gasoline and pieces of metal showered the bridge and forecastle, but major damage was avoided. One man, forced overboard during the action, was quickly recovered. Commander Joseph P. Farley received the Silver Star for his actions during this battle.

In early May, Sederstrom escorted Arkansas (BB-33) out of the combat area; and, on the 18th, Sederstrom herself left the Ryūkyūs area. Escorting Eldorado (AGC-11), she arrived at Guam on the 22d. From the Marianas, she returned to the Western Carolines, whence she escorted convoy UOK-27 to Okinawa. From 24 June to 4 July, she patrolled off the Hagushi anchorage.

On the 5th, she got underway to return to the United States for overhaul. She arrived in Puget Sound on the 26th; offloaded ammunition; and entered the Todd Shipyard at Seattle, Washington. The war ended prior to the completion of her yard period, and she was ordered to prepare for inactivation. Decommissioned on 15 November 1945, her name was struck from the Navy List on the 28th; and, two years later, on 24 November 1947, her hulk was sold for scrapping to A.G. Schoonmaker Co., Inc., New York City.

== Awards ==
- Combat Action Ribbon (retroactive)
- American Campaign Medal
- Asiatic-Pacific Campaign Medal (with five service stars)
- World War II Victory Medal
