= USS Sumter =

USS Sumter may refer to the following ships of the United States Navy:

- CSS General Sumter, a cottonclad ram captured in 1862
- USS Sumter (APA-52) (previously AP-97), an attack transport; formerly Iberville
- USS Sumter (LST-1181), a tank landing ship

== See also ==
- CSS Sumter a Confederate States Navy vessel in the American Civil War
- USS Sumpter a gunboat of the Union Navy.
