= USS Livingston =

Cargo ship of the United States Navy

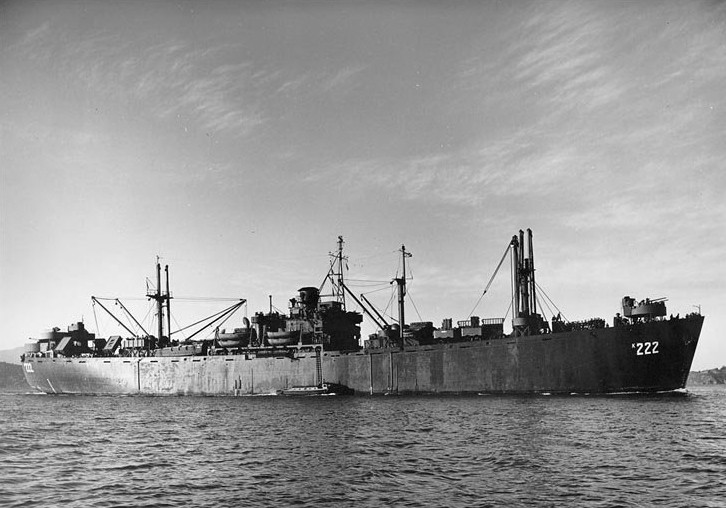
- USS Livingston (AK-222) in San Francisco Bay, California, in late 1945 or early 1946.

History

United States
- Name: Josiah D. Whitney
- Namesake: Josiah D. Whitney
- Owner: War Shipping Administration (WSA)
- Operator: Matson Navigation Company
- Ordered: as a Type EC2-S-C1 hull, MCE hull 1637
- Builder: California Shipbuilding Corporation, Terminal Island, Los Angeles, California
- Yard number: 170
- Way number: 13
- Laid down: 22 March 1943
- Launched: 16 April 1943
- Sponsored by: Mrs. D. W. Fernhout
- In service: 28 April 1943
- Fate: transferred to the US Navy, 25 October 1943

United States
- Name: Livingston
- Namesake: Livingston County, Illinois or; Livingston County, Kentucky, Livingston County, Michigan, Livingston County, Missouri, Livingston County, New York, and; Livingston Parish, Louisiana
- Acquired: 25 October 1943
- Commissioned: 10 November 1943
- Decommissioned: 27 February 1946
- Renamed: Livingston, 30 October 1943
- Reclassified: Cargo Ship, 20 August 1944
- Stricken: 27 February 1946
- Identification: Hull symbol: AP-163; Hull symbol: AK-222; Code letters: NKWD
- Nickname(s): 2 × battle star
- Fate: Sold for scrapping, 13 February 1973, removed 27 March 1973

General characteristics
- Class & type: Crater-class cargo ship
- Type: Type EC2-S-C1
- Tonnage: 4,470 t (4,400 long tons) DWT
- Displacement: 4,023 long tons (4,088 t) (light); 12,350 long tons (12,550 t) (full load)
- Length: 441 ft 6 in (134.57 m)
- Beam: 24 ft 6 in (7.47 m)
- Draft: 28 ft 4 in (8.64 m)
- Installed power: 2 × Babcock & Wilcox header-type boilers, 220psi 450°; 2,500 shp (1,900 kW)
- Propulsion: 1 × Joshua Hendy vertical triple-expansion reciprocating steam engine; 1 × shaft
- Speed: 12.8 kn (23.7 km/h; 14.7 mph)
- Capacity: 300,000 cu ft (8,500 m^{3}) (non-refrigerated)
- Complement: 225 officers and enlisted
- Armament: 1 × 5 in (127 mm)/38 caliber dual purpose (DP) gun; 4 × 3 in (76 mm)/50 caliber DP gun; 8 × 20 mm (0.79 in) Oerlikon cannons anti-aircraft (AA) gun mounts

USS Livingston (AP-163/AK-222) was a Crater-class cargo ship built for the US Navy during World War II. She was responsible for delivering troops, goods and equipment to locations in the Asiatic-Pacific Theater.

== Construction ==
Livingston was laid down 22 March 1943, under a Maritime Commission(MARCOM) contract, MC hull No. 1637, as the Liberty ship SS Josiah D. Whitney, by California Shipbuilding Corporation, Terminal Island, Los Angeles, California; launched 16 April 1943; sponsored by Mrs. D. W. Fernhout; acquired by the Navy 25 October 1943; renamed Livingston 30 October 1943; and commissioned 10 November 1943.

== Service history ==
After loading cargo, Livingston departed Port Hueneme, California, 22 November 1943, for Pearl Harbor, where she prepared for the Marshall Islands campaign. Departing Pearl Harbor 25 January 1944, with Marines and Seabees, the transport arrived off Majuro 3 February, to reinforce that island. Majuro, with its spacious lagoon, was ideal base for the mobile supply force. After unloading her cargo, Livingston returned Pearl Harbor 21 February, to prepare for the next assignment.

Following another cruise to Majuro in March, the transport remained in the Hawaiian Islands, rehearsing with the 27th Infantry Division for the Saipan invasion. Preparations complete, she departed Pearl Harbor 29 May, touched Kwajalein briefly, and arrived off Saipan 20 June. Needed "to secure control of sea communications through the central Pacific," Saipan was the scene of a bitter battle in which 24,000 Japanese lost their lives futilely attempting to stop the American offensive. Livingston remained off Saipan supporting the fighters ashore until she sailed for Eniwetok 2 July.

Throughout the summer, she transported troops and equipment among the Allied-occupied islands in the Marshall Islands, the Gilbert Islands, and the Mariana Islands. Reclassified AK-222 on 20 August, she returned to Pearl Harbor 6 days later for additional supplies. Livingston returned to the advance bases 30 September, arriving at Eniwetok. For the next 4 months, she made cargo runs to the occupied islands before departing Saipan 26 January 1945, for San Francisco.

Following a stateside overhaul, the cargo ship resumed operations in mid-April. After a round-trip cruise to Pearl Harbor, she sailed again from San Francisco, California, 15 May for Tarawa, Gilbert Islands. From arrival 12 June, she continued servicing American island forces in Micronesia throughout the rest of the war. Remaining in the western Pacific Ocean after the Japanese surrender, Livingston shuttled troops and cargo among the islands until late November. Departing Manus on 29 November, she arrived Seattle, Washington, 19 December.

== Post-war decommissioning ==
On 6 January 1946, the cargo ship arrived San Francisco where she decommissioned 27 February, and was returned to the War Shipping Administration (WSA) the same day.

== Fate ==
She was placed in the National Defense Reserve Fleet, Suisun Bay Group, until purchased by Chi Shun Hua Steel Company, Ltd., on 13 February 1973, for $185,150. She was physically removed from the Reserve Fleet on 27 March 1973.

== Awards ==
Livingston received two battle stars for World War II service. Her crew was eligible for the following medals and campaign ribbons:

- American Campaign Medal
- Asiatic-Pacific Campaign Medal (1)
- World War II Victory Medal
- Navy Occupation Service Medal (with Asia clasp)

== Notes ==
Citations

== Bibliography ==
Online resources

- "Livingston (AP-163)". Dictionary of American Naval Fighting Ships. Naval History and Heritage Command. 29 July 2015. This article incorporates text from this source, which is in the public domain.
- "California Shipbuilding, Los Angeles CA". www.ShipbuildingHistory.com. 13 October 2010.
- "USS Livingston (AK-222)". NavSource. 3 February 2017.
- "JOSIAH D. WHITNEY". United States Department of Transportation. Archived from the original on December 12, 2019.
