= USS Whitman =

Evarts-class destroyer escort

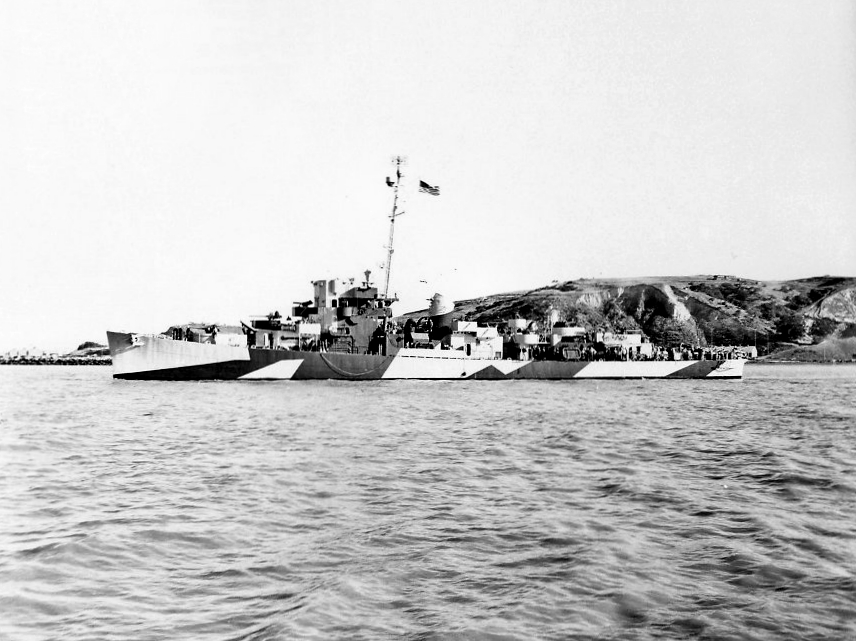
- Whitman underway, c. 21 April 1944

History

United States
- Name: USS Whitman
- Builder: Mare Island Navy Yard
- Laid down: 7 September 1942
- Launched: 19 January 1943
- Commissioned: 3 July 1943
- Decommissioned: 16 November 1945
- Stricken: 16 November 1945
- Honors and awards: 4 battle stars (World War II)
- Fate: Sold for scrapping, 31 January 1947

General characteristics
- Type: Evarts-class destroyer escort
- Displacement: 1,140 long tons (1,158 t) standard; 1,430 long tons (1,453 t) full
- Length: 289 ft 5 in (88.21 m) o/a; 283 ft 6 in (86.41 m) w/l
- Beam: 35 ft (11 m)
- Draft: 11 ft (3.4 m) (max)
- Propulsion: 4 × General Motors Model 16-278A diesel engines with electric drive, 6,000 shp (4,474 kW); 2 screws
- Speed: 19 knots (35 km/h; 22 mph)
- Range: 4,150 nmi (7,690 km)
- Complement: 15 officers and 183 enlisted
- Armament: 3 × single 3"/50 Mk.22 dual purpose guns; 1 × quad 1.1"/75 Mk.2 AA gun; 9 × 20 mm Mk.4 AA guns; 1 × Hedgehog Projector Mk.10 (144 rounds); 8 × Mk.6 depth charge projectors; 2 × Mk.9 depth charge tracks

USS Whitman (DE-24) was an Evarts-class destroyer escort constructed for the United States Navy during World War II. It was promptly sent off into the Pacific Ocean to protect convoys and other ships from Japanese submarines and fighter aircraft. By the end of the war, when she returned to the United States, she had accumulated four battle stars.

== Design ==
The Evarts-class destroyer escorts were 289 ft 5 in (88.21 m) long overall, and they had a beam of 35 ft 2 in (10.72 m). They had an average draft of 10 ft 1 in (3.07 m) at their full load displacement of 1,416 long tons (1,439 t). Each ship had a normal crew numbered 156 officers and sailors.

Whitman was propelled by a pair of diesel motors manufactured by General Motors, which drove a pair of screw propellers. Her propulsion system was rated to produce 6,000 brake horsepower (4,500 kW) for a top speed of 19.5 knots (36.1 km/h; 22.4 mph). Oil storage amounted to between 131 and 197 long tons (133 and 200 t), which allowed a cruising radius of up to 6,000 nautical miles (11,000 km; 6,900 mi) at an economical pace of 10 knots (19 km/h; 12 mph).

The ship's armament consisted of a main battery of three 3-inch (76 mm) /50-caliber guns in individual pivot mounts, which could be used against air or surface targets. These were supported by a light anti-aircraft battery that initially consisted of four 1.1 in (28 mm) /75-caliber guns in a quadruple mount and nine 20 mm (0.79 in) Oerlikon guns. For attacks against submarines, the ship was equipped with a Hedgehog mortar, eight depth charge throwers, and two depth charge racks.

== Service history ==
She was laid down on 7 September 1942 at the Mare Island Navy Yard, Vallejo, California, and was initially earmarked for transfer to the Royal Navy under lend-lease. However, the U.S. Navy decided to retain the ship for its own use; and she was reclassified to DE-24 on 7 January 1943. She was launched on 19 January 1943; sponsored by Mrs. Josephine P. Whitman, the widow of Lt. (jg.) Robert Scott Whitman, who had been killed during the Battle of Midway. The ship was commissioned at Mare Island on 3 July 1943.

After shakedown out of San Diego, California, and post-shakedown availability, Whitman departed San Francisco, California, on 11 September, escorting Convoy 2298, bound for the Hawaiian Islands. Nine days later, she arrived at Pearl Harbor and safely delivered her charges. She then convoyed the seaplane tender Pocomoke (AV-9) to Canton and Phoenix Islands in early October before she was detached to return to Pearl Harbor. In November, she moved to the Central Pacific for her first major operation, the thrust against the Japanese held Gilbert Islands. With the Commander, Escort Division 10 embarked as concurrent Commander, Task Group (TG) 57.7, Whitman patrolled off the entrance to Tarawa lagoon and performed local escort missions into December 1943.

Returning, via Funafuti in the Ellice Islands, to Hawaii, Whitman underwent engine repairs at the Pearl Harbor Navy Yard in January 1944, before she participated in the invasion and occupation of the Marshalls, escorting a group of tankers (designated as Task Unit (TU) 53.8.3) to Majuro on D plus four-day. The destroyer escort subsequently performed several convoy escort missions between Hawaii and the Marshalls and then steamed to the west coast in March for a major overhaul at the Mare Island Navy Yard. She returned to Pearl Harbor on 10 May. Whitman departed the Hawaiian Islands on 27 May to escort TU 16.6.4, a Service Force unit, to the forward areas. The tanker group to which Whitman was attached fueled some of the ships of the Fleet participating in the Marianas operation that June. The destroyer escort subsequently performed local escort missions in the Marshalls before heading back to Pearl Harbor in the autumn.

After returning to Hawaiian waters, Whitman operated with the U.S. Pacific Fleet submarines out of Pearl Harbor from October 1944 to May 1945, providing target services to the submariners' training program. In addition, whenever a shortage of escort vessels came up, ships such as Whitman were summoned to provide a variety of services, including anti-submarine patrols and plane-guarding. While engaged in the latter on 23 February 1945, Whitman rescued Lt. (jg.) Ward J. Taylor after he had made a forced landing while the destroyer escort was plane-guarding for Fanshaw Bay (CVE-70). Whitman performed her service speedily and brought Taylor safely on board only five minutes after the accident occurred. After that stint in Hawaiian waters, the destroyer escort was assigned to TG 96.3 in June 1945 and performed patrol and escort missions to Eniwetok, Johnston Island, Kwajalein, and Ulithi through the summer of 1945.

On 10 August 1945, the day upon which the Japanese indicated a desire to surrender unconditionally to the Allies, Whitman departed Eniwetok with Convoy EU-172, bound for Ulithi. She was en route from Ulithi to Eniwetok with Convoy UE-123 when the Japanese capitulated five days later. She was at Eniwetok when the formal surrender was signed on board Missouri (BB-63) in Tokyo Bay. Departing Kwajalein for the last time on 14 September 1945, Whitman sailed for Pearl Harbor and arrived there on the 20th. Her stay was brief, however, for she got underway for the west coast the next day. Making port at San Pedro, Los Angeles, on 27 September, Whitman was decommissioned on 1 November and struck from the Navy List on the 16th. Sold to the National Metal and Steel Co. of Terminal Island, California, and delivered on 31 January 1947, the ship was scrapped on 20 March 1948.

== Awards ==
- Combat Action Ribbon (retroactive)
- American Campaign Medal
- Asiatic-Pacific Campaign Medal (with four service stars)
- World War II Victory Medal
