= USS Custer =

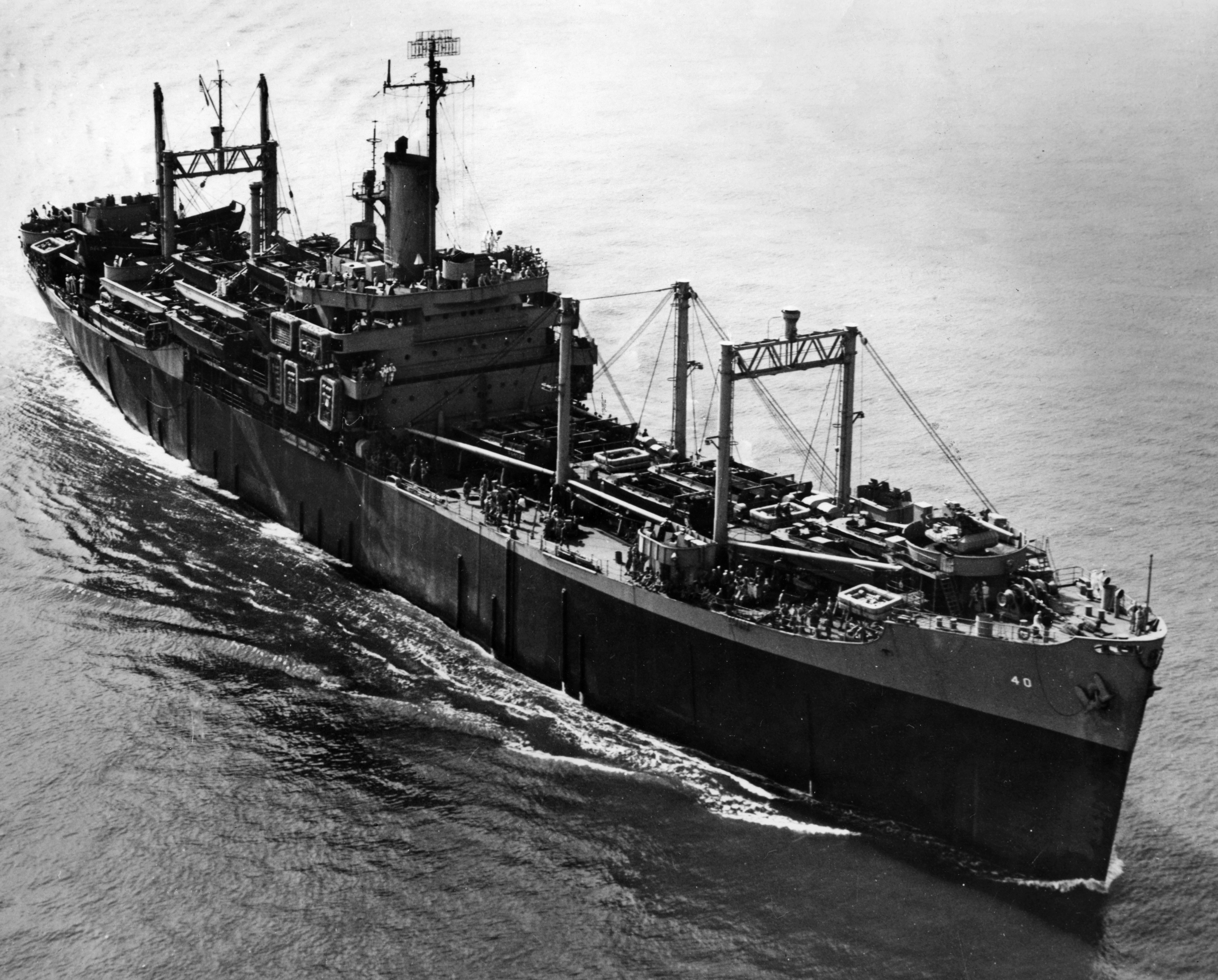
- USS Custer on 18 September 1943

History

United States
- Name: Custer
- Namesake: Custer County, Colorado; Custer County, Idaho; Custer County, Montana; Custer County, Nebraska; Custer County, Oklahoma; Custer County, South Dakota
- Ordered: as type (C3-S-A2) hull, MC hull 388
- Builder: Ingalls Shipbuilding, Pascagoula, Mississippi
- Laid down: as SS Sea Eagle
- Launched: 6 November 1942
- Sponsored by: Mrs. L. S. Border
- Acquired: 23 January 1943 as AP-85
- Commissioned: 18 July 1943 as APA-40
- Decommissioned: 24 May 1946
- Reclassified: APA-40, 1 February 1943
- Stricken: 19 July 1946
- Honours and awards: Six battle stars for service in World War II.
- Fate: Scrapped, 1973

General characteristics
- Class & type: Bayfield-class attack transport
- Displacement: 8,100 tons; 16,100 tons loaded
- Length: 492 ft (150 m)
- Beam: 69 ft 6 in (21.18 m)
- Draft: 26 ft 6 in (8.08 m)
- Propulsion: General Electric geared turbine, 2 x Combustion Engineering D-type boilers, single propeller, designed shaft horsepower 8,500
- Speed: 18 knots
- Boats & landing craft carried: 12 x LCVP, 4 x LCM (Mk-6), 3 x LCP(L) (MK-IV)
- Capacity: 4,700 tons (200,000 cu. ft).
- Complement: Crew: 51 officers, 524 enlisted; Flag: 43 officers, 108 enlisted.; Troops: 80 officers, 1,146 enlisted
- Armament: x single 5 inch/38 cal. dual purpose gun mounts, one fore and one aft.; 2 × twin 40mm AA gun mounts forward, port and starboard.; 2 × single 40mm AA gun mounts.; 18 × single 20mm AA gun mounts.

USS Custer (AP-85/APA-40) was a Bayfield-class attack transport in service with the United States Navy from 1943 to 1946. She was sold into commercial service in 1948 and was scrapped in 1973.

== History ==
USS Custer (AP-85) was launched as SS Sea Eagle 6 November 1942 by Ingalls Shipbuilding Co., Pascagoula, Mississippi, under a U.S. Maritime Commission contract; sponsored by Mrs. L. S. Border. Her original passenger capacity was 12, and was to carry a crew of 52 with an original cargo carrying capacity of 16,628 tons.

The United States Navy received the ship on 23 January 1943 and renamed her the USS Custer (APA-40) in honor of the several Custer counties in the United States. Custer moved to the Bethlehem Steel Shipyard, Hoboken, New Jersey, to be converted into, and armed as an attack transport - the period of conversion consumed 159 days. On 18 July 1943, Custer was placed in full commission at Pier 1, Bethlehem Steel Shipyard, Hoboken, New Jersey.

Her trial run was made on the East River on 28 July 1943. Post-trial repairs were made at Pier 36, Brooklyn, and were completed on 9 August 1943. 10 August 1943, Custer sailed for Norfolk, Virginia, arriving on 12 August 1943. 13 August 1943, Custer received her landing craft; 26 LCVP's and 2 LCM(3)'s; along with boat crew and officers.

During the period from 14 August 1943 to the latter part of November, the ship was engaged in training exercises in Chesapeake Bay. Dummy loads were carried, and dawn landings were rehearsed. 17 November 1943, Custer returned to Norfolk Navy Yard, Portsmouth Virginia, for overhaul and dry-docking.

=== World War II operations ===
Departing Norfolk, Virginia, 11 December 1943, Custer arrived at Pearl Harbor 10 January 1944, carrying Seabees. She loaded troops at Honolulu and sortied 23 January as a part of Task Force 51 for the Marshall Islands operation. Held in reserve during the invasion of Kwajalein, she landed her troops on Eniwetok on 19 February and embarked casualties, with whom she returned to Pearl Harbor 6 March.

After sailing to embark men and cargo at San Francisco, California, Custer joined in amphibious training exercises in the Hawaiian Islands, and arrived at Kwajalein 9 June. She put to sea 2 days later for the assaults on Saipan and later on Guam, transporting troops and evacuating casualties to Eniwetok until her return to Pearl Harbor 7 August.

Custer sailed from Pearl Harbor 15 September 1944 by way of Eniwetok and Manus for the invasion landings on Leyte of 20 and 21 October. Safely out of Leyte Gulf before the great battle for its possession, she loaded reinforcements at Humboldt Bay, New Guinea, from 26 October to 14 November, then landed them on Leyte 18 November.

After replenishing at Manus and training at Huon Gulf, New Guinea., Custer sailed on 31 December for the invasion landings at Lingayen Gulf of 9 to 12 January 1945. She operated in the Philippine Islands, participating in the unopposed landings at La Paz, Zambales, on 29 January and acting as mother ship for landing craft and coordinating cargo activities at Tarraguna, from 13 to 20 February.

Custer sailed from Leyte Gulf 27 March 1945 for the invasion of Okinawa. From 1 to 6 April she landed troops and cargo and fought off air attacks during the initial landings, then sailed for a stateside overhaul. Departing San Diego, California, 5 August, she embarked troops at Pearl Harbor for the occupation of Japan, landing them at Sasebo, Japan. She sailed to transport troops from Manila to Sasebo, Japan, then embarked homeward bound servicemen for San Pedro, California, arriving 21 November.

=== Invasion log ===
Place	Date	Transported
Kwajalein	2 February 1944	1st Bn., 106th Inf., 27th Div., USA
Eniwetok	17 February 1944	1st Bn., 106th Inf., 27th Div., USA
Saipan	15 June 1944	2nd Bn., 165th Inf., 27th Div., USA
Guam	21 July 1944	2nd 155 M.M. Howitzer Bn., Corps Arty., USMC
Leyte (Dulag)	20 October 1944	2nd Bd., 17th Reg., 7th Div., USA
Leyte (Tarraguna)	18 November 1944	2nd Bn., 503rd. Parachute Reg., USA
Lingayen	9 January 1945	3rd Bn., 160th Reg., 40th Div., USA
La Paz, Zambales Province, Luzon, P.I.	29 January 1945	2nd Bn., 152nd Inf., 38th Div., USA
Okinawa Jima	1 April 1945	18th Reg., Hdqtrs, 7th Div., USA

=== Decommissioning and fate ===
Custer was decommissioned on 24 May 1946 and struck from the Navy List on 19 July 1946. On 19 April 1948, she was sold to the Moore McCormack Line and SS Mormacmar. She was sold on 19 August 1966 to Grace Lines Inc. and renamed SS Santa Ana before being sold for scrapping on 8 February 1973 to Hua Eng Copper & Iron Industrial Co., Kaohsiung, Taiwan.

== Honors and awards ==
Custer received six battle stars for World War II service.

- Marshall Islands operation - Occupation of Eniwetok Atoll, 19 February 1945
- Marianas operation - Capture and occupation of Saipan, 11 June 1944 –

Capture and occupation of Guam, 12 July 1944

- Leyte operation - Leyte landings, 20 to 21 October and 18 November 1944
- Luzon operation - Lingayen Gulf landings, 9 to 12 January 1945
- Manila Bay-Bicol operation - Zambales-Subic Bay, La Paz landing, 29 January 1945
- Okinawa Gunto operation - Assault and occupation of Okinawa Gunto, 1 to 6 April 1945

Qualified Custer personnel were eligible for the following:

- American Campaign Medal
- Asiatic-Pacific Campaign Medal with six battle stars
- World War II Victory Medal
- Navy Occupation Medal with "ASIA" clasp
- Philippine Presidential Unit Citation
- Philippines Liberation Medal with two stars
