= USS Leon =

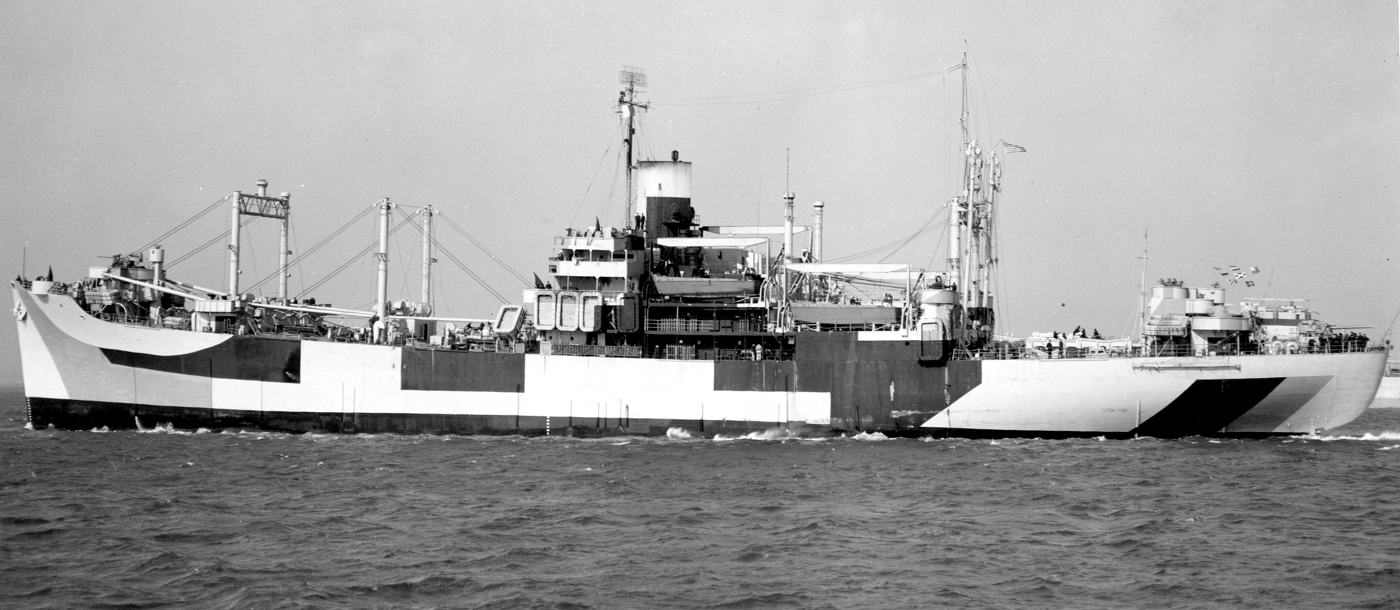

History

United States
- Namesake: Leon County, Florida, Leon County, Texas
- Builder: Ingalls Shipbuilding
- Laid down: 6 February 1943
- Launched: 19 June 1943
- Christened: Sea Dolphin
- Commissioned: 12 February 1944
- Decommissioned: 7 March 1946
- Renamed: USS Leon, Steel Chemist.
- Reclassified: APA-48, 1 February 1943
- Honours and awards: Four battle stars for service in World War II.
- Fate: Scrapped, 1971.

General characteristics
- Class & type: Bayfield-class attack transport
- Displacement: 8,100 tons, 16,100 tons fully loaded
- Length: 492 ft (150 m)
- Beam: 69 ft 6 in (21.18 m)
- Draft: 26 ft 6 in (8.08 m)
- Propulsion: Westinghouse geared turbine, 2 x Foster Wheeler D-type boilers, single propeller, designed shaft horsepower 8,500
- Speed: 18 knots
- Boats & landing craft carried: 12 x LCVP, 4 x LCM (Mk-6), 3 x LCP(L) (MK-IV)
- Capacity: 4,700 tons (175,000 cu. ft).
- Complement: Crew: 51 officers, 524 enlisted; Flag: 43 officers, 108 enlisted.; Troops: 80 officers, 1,146 enlisted
- Armament: 2 × single 5 inch/38 cal. dual purpose gun mounts, one fore and one aft.; 2 × twin 40mm AA gun mounts.; 2 × single 40mm AA gun mounts.; 18 × single 20mm AA gun mounts.

USS Leon (APA-48) was a Bayfield-class attack transport in service with the United States Navy from 1944 to 1946. She was sold into commercial service in 1947 and was scrapped in 1971.

== History ==
USS Leon was originally planned as transport USS Sea Dolpin (AP-93), but the vessel was renamed Leon 3 October 1942; redesignated APA-48, 1 February 1943; laid down 6 February 1943 by Maritime Commission contract; launched 19 June; accepted by the U.S. Navy and commissioned 11 September for transfer to Bethlehem Steel Shipyard, Brooklyn, for conversion to an attack transport; decommissioned 27 September; and recommissioned in full 12 February 1944.

=== Pacific War ===
Upon arrival in Norfolk, Virginia on 24 February, Leon received her quota of landing craft and underwent shakedown. With 1,345 Marines of the 47th Replacement Battalion and 195 Seabees embarked, she departed Naval Base Norfolk 18 March for the Pacific, arriving Pearl Harbor 7 April.

By this time, a great store of battle experience in operations had been gained since the early landings in the Solomon Islands. With the United States now controlling many of the Gilbert and Marshall Islands, Leon and elements of the 4th Marine Division practiced and rehearsed almost 2 months for the next leapfrog into the Marianas. As part of TG 52.4, she sortied from Honolulu 29 May. The invasion fleet rendezvoused at Eniwetok and arrived off Saipan 15 June. On D-Day, Leon's beach party and boats, in the midst of enemy artillery and mortar fire, successfully put ashore their Marines although three boats were lost. Nine days later, she departed and arrived Pearl Harbor 20 July.

Again the cycle of training and invasion repeated itself. This time, the 81st Infantry Division was embarked with the Palau Islands as the objective. On 17 September, her boats put 1,404 troops ashore on Angaur Island. Recalled from the area 23 September, she proceeded to Manus Island in the Admiralty group.

Preparations now were underway for the invasion of the Philippines. Leon transported elements of the 1st Cavalry Division to Leyte from 16 to 22 October, and, on a repeat voyage, debarked troops of the 77th Division there on 23 November.

Leon, as part of Rear Adm. R. L. Connoley's Reinforcement Group 77.9, brought troops from both Noemfoor and Leyte to Lingayen Gulf, Luzon, on 11 and 27 January, respectively. Completing the latter debarkation, the attack transport sailed to Guadalcanal to prepare for the Okinawa campaign.

Departing 15 March with members of the 11th Special Construction Battalion and 6th Marine Division, including a platoon of war dogs, she arrived off the Okinawa landing area on Easter Sunday, D-Day, 1 April. After her troops were ashore, Leon remained to unload cargo. The night of 4 April, in a high wind, she slipped a dragging anchor and worked her way skillfully through the crowded anchorage to sea and the next day departed for Saipan.

After a drydock period at Pearl Harbor, she had the pleasant task 31 May to 6 June of transporting 299 Waves and a vast quantity of mail from San Francisco to Pearl Harbor. She resumed her task of carrying Army troops 1 July when she departed Portland, Oregon, with 1,368 officers and men for Pearl Harbor.

Leon proceeded on to Ulithi and Okinawa where she took on board 1,169 men of the Army's 7th Infantry Division destined to accept the surrender of the Japanese in South Korea. After a 3-day voyage, landings were effected 8 and 9 September at Inchon (Jinsen), 5 years before landings there were to turn the tide in the Korean War. The vacuum in northern China created by the collapse of the Japanese was partially filled, at first by U.S. Marines and later by Chinese Nationalist troops. Leon and sister ships of Vice Adm. D. E. Barbey's 7th Amphibious Force were involved in this operation, bringing Marines from Okinawa to Tientsin, China, 30 September and carrying Chinese troops from Hong Kong to Chinwangtao 30 October and Qingdao 14 November.

The attack transport now turned her bow toward home. At Sasebo, Japan, as part of Operation Magic Carpet, she embarked 5th Marine Division veterans and sailed 9 December for San Diego, arriving Christmas Day, with happy passengers and crew. Leon departed San Diego, 11 January 1946; arrived Mobile, Alabama, 1 February; proceeded to Chickasaw, Alabama 1 March; and decommissioned 7 March.

=== Decommissioning and fate ===
Leon was transferred to the War Shipping Administration 2 April. She was sold to the Isthmian Steamship Company in 1947, who renamed her Steel Chemist. The vessel was scrapped in 1971.

== Awards ==
Leon received four battle stars for World War II service.
