= USS Herald (AM-101) =

1942 minesweeper

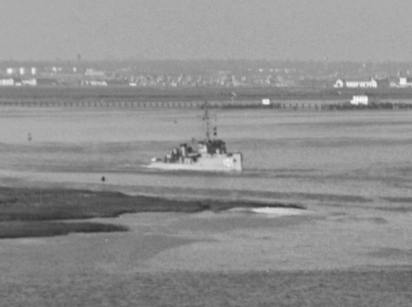
- USS Herald (AM-101) in December 1953

History

United States
- Name: USS Herald (AM-101)
- Builder: General Engineering & Dry Dock Company, Alameda, California
- Launched: 4 July 1942
- Commissioned: 23 March 1943
- Decommissioned: 31 May 1946
- Recommissioned: 5 March 1952
- Reclassified: MSF-101, 7 February 1955
- Decommissioned: 15 April 1955
- Stricken: 1 July 1972
- Honours and awards: 2 battle stars (World War II)
- Fate: Sold to Mexico, 1 February 1973

History

Mexico
- Name: ARM Mariano Matamoros (G17)
- Namesake: Mariano Matamoros
- Acquired: 1 February 1973
- Reclassified: as survey ship
- Stricken: before 1993
- Fate: unknown

General characteristics
- Class & type: Auk-class minesweeper
- Displacement: 890 long tons (904 t)
- Length: 221 ft 3 in (67.44 m)
- Beam: 32 ft (9.8 m)
- Draft: 10 ft 9 in (3.28 m)
- Speed: 18 knots (33 km/h; 21 mph)
- Complement: 100 officers and enlisted
- Armament: 1 × 3"/50 caliber gun; 2 × 40 mm guns; 2 × 20 mm guns; 2 × Depth charge tracks

USS Herald (AM-101) was an Auk-class minesweeper acquired by the United States Navy for the dangerous task of removing mines from minefields laid in the water to prevent ships from passing.

Herald was named after the word "herald", which means "a bearer of news".

Herald was the second of two U.S. Navy ships named the Herald, was a steel-hulled diesel-powered minesweeper launched by General Engineering & Dry Dock Co., Alameda, California, on 4 July 1942; and commissioned on 23 March 1943.

== World War II North Pacific operations ==
Following her shakedown training off the California coast, Herald got underway on 16 May 1943 for Dutch Harbor, Alaska, where she took part in patrols and was present for the unopposed landing on Kiska Island on 15 August. The ship resumed her patrol and escort duties; but, after suffering severe damage in a storm on 6 November 1943 returned to Seattle, Washington on 10 December for repairs.

== World War II South Pacific operations ==
The minesweeper returned to duty on 12 February 1944, sailing to Pearl Harbor on the 22nd. After two convoy voyages to the Marshalls, she got underway on 30 May to join the fleet at Eniwetok for one of the most important amphibious operations of the war, the invasion of the Marianas. Herald arrived off Saipan on D-day, 15 June, and performed minesweeping and escort duties. While the U.S. fleet won a great victory at the Battle of the Philippine Sea 19 to 21 June, the minesweeper protected the transport and fueling areas off Saipan. She sailed to Tarawa on 17 July to escort a group of LST's back to Pearl Harbor, where she arrived 26 July.

In the months that followed, Herald performed vital convoy work in the Marshalls and Marianas, including patrol and some minesweeping work. In early 1945 she served as an escort ship for submarines returning to Ulithi from war patrols. Herald sailed from Pearl Harbor for the United States on 11 May 1945, arriving San Francisco, California, seven days later.

== Post-World War II operations ==
At San Francisco, California at war's end, the minesweeper sailed on 1 September 1945 to take part in the giant sweeping operations necessary for rapid and safe occupation of the former Japanese islands. Arriving Sasebo, Japan, 26 October, Herald operated in the South China Sea until departing on 15 January 1946 for the United States.

Arriving San Diego, California, on 17 February after stops at Eniwetok and Pearl Harbor, Herald was decommissioned on 31 May 1946 and was placed in reserve.

Herald received two battle stars for World War II service.

== Second commission ==
Herald was recommissioned on 5 March 1952 at San Diego, California. Herald spent the remainder of the year in shakedown training and minesweeping drills on the east coast of the United States. Operating out of Charleston, South Carolina, the ship made two cruises to the Mediterranean in the spring of 1953 and the summer of 1954, strengthening the U.S. 6th Fleet in that troubled region. Herald continued to take part in fleet maneuvers and training off the U.S. East Coast and in the Caribbean until arriving Jacksonville, Florida, 10 February 1955.

== Decommissioning and sale ==
Herald decommissioned at Green Cove Springs on 15 April 1955 and entered the Atlantic Reserve Fleet, berthed at Orange, Texas. She was reclassified MSF-101, on 7 February 1955.

Struck from the Naval Register on 1 July 1972, the ship was sold to Mexico on 1 February 1973, to serve as ARM Mariano Matamoros. Fate unknown.
