= SS Antinous =

SS Antinous may refer to one of two Type C2-S-E1 ships built by Gulf Shipbuilding for the United States Maritime Commission:

- SS Antinous (1943) (MC hull number 483), transferred to the United States Navy as Sumter-class attack transport USS Baxter (APA-94); sold for commercial use in 1947; scrapped in 1968
- SS Antinous (1944) (MC hull number 1604), scrapped in 1970

Other ships named Antinous include -

- SS Antinous (1920), an American cargo ship torpedoed and sunk in 1942
