= SS Jean Lafitte =

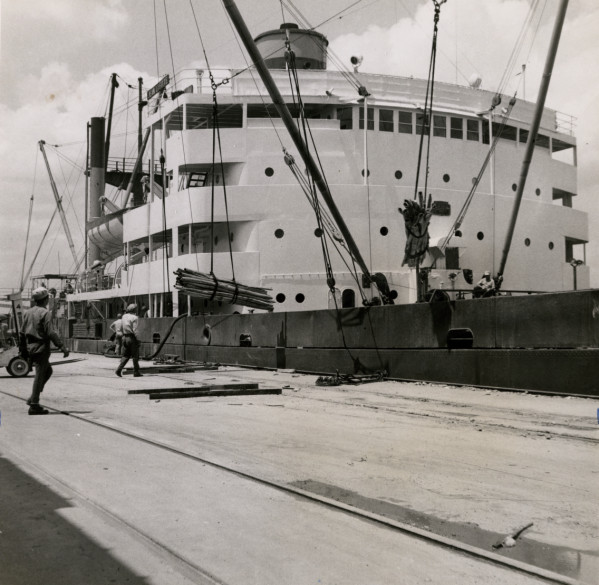
SS Jean Lafitte

SS Jean Lafitte may refer to one of two Type C2-S-E1 ships built by Gulf Shipbuilding for the United States Maritime Commission:

- SS Jean Lafitte (1942) (MC hull number 475), transferred to the United States Navy as Sumter-class attack transport USS Warren (APA-53); sold for commercial use in 1947; converted to container ship in 1965; scrapped in 1977
- SS Jean Lafitte (1943) (MC hull number 480), C2 type ship, 1943–1946 War Shipping Administration troop transport, scrapped in 1969
