= SS Afoundria =

A number of steamships were named Afoundria, including –

- SS Afoundria (1919), a Design 1022 ship in service 1919–1942, torpedoed and sunk by U-108.
- SS Afoundria (1942) (MC hull number 476), a Type C2-S-E1 ship, transferred to the United States Navy as Sumter-class attack transport USS Wayne (APA-54); sold for commercial use in 1947; converted to container ship in 1958; scrapped in 1977
- SS Afoundria (1943) (MC hull number 483), a Type C2-S-E1 ship, converted to troopship March 1944, War Shipping Administration operation to March 1945, converted to container ship in 1966; scrapped in 1979
