= USS Burden R. Hastings =

Evarts-class destroyer escort

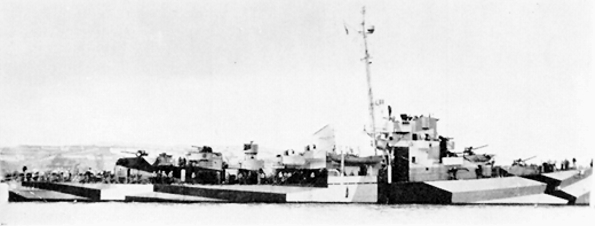

History

United States
- Name: USS Burden R. Hastings
- Builder: Mare Island Navy Yard
- Laid down: 15 April 1942
- Launched: 20 November 1942, as HMS Duckworth (BDE-19)
- Commissioned: 1 May 1943
- Decommissioned: 25 October 1945
- Renamed: USS Burden R. Hastings, 25 January 1943
- Stricken: 13 November 1945
- Honors and awards: 4 battle stars (World War II)
- Fate: Sold for scrapping, 1 February 1946

General characteristics
- Type: Evarts-class destroyer escort
- Displacement: 1,140 long tons (1,158 t) standard; 1,430 long tons (1,453 t) full
- Length: 289 ft 5 in (88.21 m) o/a; 283 ft 6 in (86.41 m) w/l
- Beam: 35 ft 2 in (10.72 m)
- Draft: 11 ft (3.4 m) (max)
- Propulsion: 4 × General Motors Model 16-278A diesel engines with electric drive, 6,000 shp (4,474 kW); 2 screws
- Speed: 19 knots (35 km/h; 22 mph)
- Range: 4,150 nmi (7,690 km)
- Complement: 15 officers and 183 enlisted
- Armament: 3 × single 3"/50 Mk.22 dual-purpose guns; 1 × quad 1.1"/75 Mk.2 AA gun; 9 × 20 mm Mk.4 AA guns; 1 × Hedgehog Projector Mk.10 (144 rounds); 8 × Mk.6 depth charge projectors; 2 × Mk.9 depth charge tracks

USS Burden R. Hastings (DE-19) was an Evarts-class destroyer escort of the United States Navy during World War II. Immediately after being built, she was crewed and sent to the Pacific Ocean to escort convoys and to protect them from air and submarine attack. During her wartime service, she was credited with having sunk one Japanese submarine and otherwise protecting numerous ships from danger. She was awarded four battle stars for her services in battle areas.

Originally built for the United Kingdom under Lend-Lease, she was launched as HMS Duckworth (BDE-19) on 20 November 1942 by Mare Island Navy Yard. Taken over by the United States and reclassified DE-19 on 25 January 1943, the ship was renamed Burden R. Hastings on 19 February 1943; and commissioned on 1 May 1943.

== Design ==
The Evarts-class destroyer escorts were 289 ft 5 in (88.21 m) long overall, and they had a beam of 35 ft 2 in (10.72 m). They had an average draft of 10 ft 1 in (3.07 m) at their full load displacement of 1,416 long tons (1,439 t). Each ship had a normal crew numbered 156 officers and sailors.

Burden R. Hastings was propelled by a pair of diesel motors manufactured by General Motors, which drove a pair of screw propellers. Her propulsion system was rated to produce 6,000 brake horsepower (4,500 kW) for a top speed of 19.5 knots (36.1 km/h; 22.4 mph). Oil storage amounted to between 131 and 197 long tons (133 and 200 t), which allowed a cruising radius of up to 6,000 nautical miles (11,000 km; 6,900 mi) at an economical pace of 10 knots (19 km/h; 12 mph).

The ship's armament consisted of a main battery of three 3-inch (76 mm) /50-caliber guns in individual pivot mounts, which could be used against air or surface targets. These were supported by a light anti-aircraft battery that initially consisted of four 1.1 in (28 mm) /75-caliber guns in a quadruple mount and nine 20 mm (0.79 in) Oerlikon guns. For attacks against submarines, the ship was equipped with a Hedgehog mortar, eight depth charge throwers, and two depth charge racks.

== Service history ==
=== Pacific Theatre operations, 1943 ===
During July 1943 Burden R. Hastings made a quick voyage between California and Pearl Harbor and return. In August she returned to Pearl Harbor and then proceeded to Baker Island where she carried out patrol and escort duties. On 12 November she arrived off Tarawa, Gilbert Islands, and carried out pre-invasion bombardments of Japanese positions until the 20th, when landings were made. She remained in support of the occupation until 23 November and then departed for the newly established Advanced Naval Base at Funafuti, Ellice Islands. During the remainder of 1943 Burden R. Hastings escorted two convoys to Tarawa and one to Nouméa, New Caledonia, and then returned to Pearl Harbor, arriving on 8 January 1944.

=== 1944 ===
Burden R. Hastings departed Pearl Harbor on 28 January 1944 and proceeded to the Marshall Islands where she supported the occupation of Kwajalein (5–6 February). Returning to Pearl Harbor on 13 February, she remained in the vicinity of the Hawaiian Islands until the 29th. Once again she returned to the Marshalls and then participated in the Palau-Yap-Ulithi-Woleai raids (30 March – 1 April). During the remainder of World War II Burden R. Hastings operated as a convoy escort, plane guard, and unit of various hunter-killer groups in the area of the Marshall, Gilbert, and western Caroline Islands.

==== Sinking of the Japanese submarine Ro-44 ====
Detached from duty at Majuro on 13 June, Burden R. Hastings headed via Eniwetok for Pearl Harbor, proceeding independently. At 0250 on 16 June, the warship's SL radar picked up a surface contact 10 miles away that showed no IFF (Identification Friend or Foe) signal. The small "pip" on the radar screen indicated either a surfaced submarine or a small craft, so the captain decided to close range to 5,000 yards (4,600 m) and challenge the stranger visually. Burden R. Hastings proceeded ahead through the moderate sea while her quarry moved at 18 knots (33 km/h; 21 mph). The destroyer escort rang up 19.5 knots (36.1 km/h; 22.4 mph) to close range and went to General Quarters. At 0337, when the two ships were 5,000 yards apart, Burden R. Hastings challenged thrice with an Aldis lamp but received no reply. She then fired four star shells in an effort to illuminate; but, after the second burst, radar plot reported that the "pip" had disappeared from the screen.

Burden R. Hastings then began to hunt a submarine. Opening her sonar search at 0344, she latched onto the contact at 0354, picking up a slow-moving submarine, 1,700 yards (1,600 m) distant. Following one fruitless hedgehog attack, Burden R. Hastings repeated the procedure after regaining contact. A heavy underwater explosion and a phosphorescent flash beneath the waves testified to the success of her second "hedgehog" run. The destroyer escort then passed over the submarine, and four depth charges splashed into her wake, drifting downward toward the target. Five seconds after the four charges exploded, a violent explosion rumbled up from the depths. The concussion knocked out Burden R. Hastings' gyro compass and caused other minor damage throughout the ship. Further searching failed to disclose any other contact. At sunrise, lookouts spotted debris and a "moderate" oil slick. Burden R. Hastings launched her motor whaleboat and its crew picked up wreckage. Characters on top of a small spare parts box indicated that her victim had been Ro-44. Postwar examination of Japanese records corroborated the sinking of Ro-44. At 1900 on 16 June, Burden R. Hastings resumed her voyage to Pearl Harbor where she arrived on 22 June.

==== Later activity ====
After an availability that extended to 4 July, she spent the next three days screening Ommaney Bay as the escort carrier conducted carrier qualifications in the Hawaiian operating area. On 9 July, Burden R. Hastings and four other destroyer escorts left Pearl Harbor to escort a large convoy of troopships to Eniwetok. Reaching that atoll on 17 July, she cleared the Marshalls the same day, on her way back to Hawaii in company with North Carolina, Bataan, Windham Bay, and Hugh L. Scott. The formation arrived at Pearl Harbor on 23 July. The next day, Burden R. Hastings commenced a tour of duty under Commander, Submarine Training, Pacific (ComSubTrainPac). On 23 August, Burden R. Hastings sailed for San Francisco, escorting SS Philippa. Arriving on the last day of August, the destroyer escort unloaded ammunition and moored at the Hunters Point Naval Drydocks for a yard overhaul.

On 26 October, the destroyer escort took on ammunition, and spent the next few days engaged in post-overhaul trials. On 6 November, Burden R. Hastings sailed for Hawaii as part of the escort for a 16-ship convoy and arrived at Pearl Harbor ten days later. After an availability, the warship set course for the Marshalls on 26 November and arrived at Eniwetok on 4 December. For the remainder of December 1944 and for most of January 1945, Burden R. Hastings escorted convoys between Eniwetok and Ulithi, in the Western Carolines.

=== 1945 ===
During her stay at Ulithi on 12 January 1945, the Japanese submarine I-36 launched a kaiten (manned torpedo) attack against the anchorage. At 0654 that morning, one of the torpedoes struck and damaged the ammunition ship Mazama at anchor in Ulithi lagoon. Since the deed was thought to be the work of a midget submarine, all ASW-equipped ships – Burden R. Hastings included – conducted a thorough, but futile, search until late in the afternoon. Two weeks later, wreckage of what resembled the afterbody of a torpedo washed up on one of the islands ringing the lagoon.

Leaving the Marshalls on 24 January 1945 with SS Afoundria, Burden R. Hastings touched at Roi, Kwajalein, and Majuro where the Army transport picked up troops bound for Hawaii. After arriving at Pearl Harbor on 2 February, the destroyer escort commenced four months of work with carriers and submarines, planeguarding and participating in the training of the "fleet boats" as they worked up in Hawaiian waters. During the course of her planeguarding, she picked up the crews of several planes that had crashed. On 22 June, Burden R. Hastings departed Pearl Harbor with the rest of CortDiv 10, the first time that the ships had operated together as a unit, escorting a convoy of transports to the Marshall Islands. Upon reaching Eniwetok on 30 June, the ship embarked upon a series of convoy-escort runs between Eniwetok and Ulithi, a routine which she maintained through July and into the first part of August. While returning from Ulithi to Eniwetok on 14 August, she learned of Japan's acceptance of the provisions of the Potsdam Declaration and agreement to surrender to the Allies.

=== End-of-War deactivation ===
Reaching Eniwetok on 17 August 1945, Burden R. Hastings remained inactive in the Marshalls until receiving orders to return to the United States for decommissioning. In company with Wileman and two other destroyer escorts, she sailed for Kwajalein on 11 September, rendezvoused there with the rest of the division, and left the Marshalls on 14 September bound for Pearl Harbor. Reaching Hawaii five days later, the destroyer escort pushed on to San Pedro, California. Reporting to the Commandant, 11th Naval District, for disposition on 29 September 1945, Burden R Hastings was decommissioned on 25 October 1945 at Terminal Island, California; and her name was struck from the Navy List on 13 November 1945. She was sold to the National Metal and Steel Corp., of Terminal Island, and was delivered to her purchaser on 1 February 1947.

== Awards ==
- Combat Action Ribbon (retroactive)
- American Campaign Medal
- Asiatic–Pacific Campaign Medal (with four service stars)
- World War II Victory Medal
