= USS Sumter (APA-52) =

Sumter-class attack transport ship

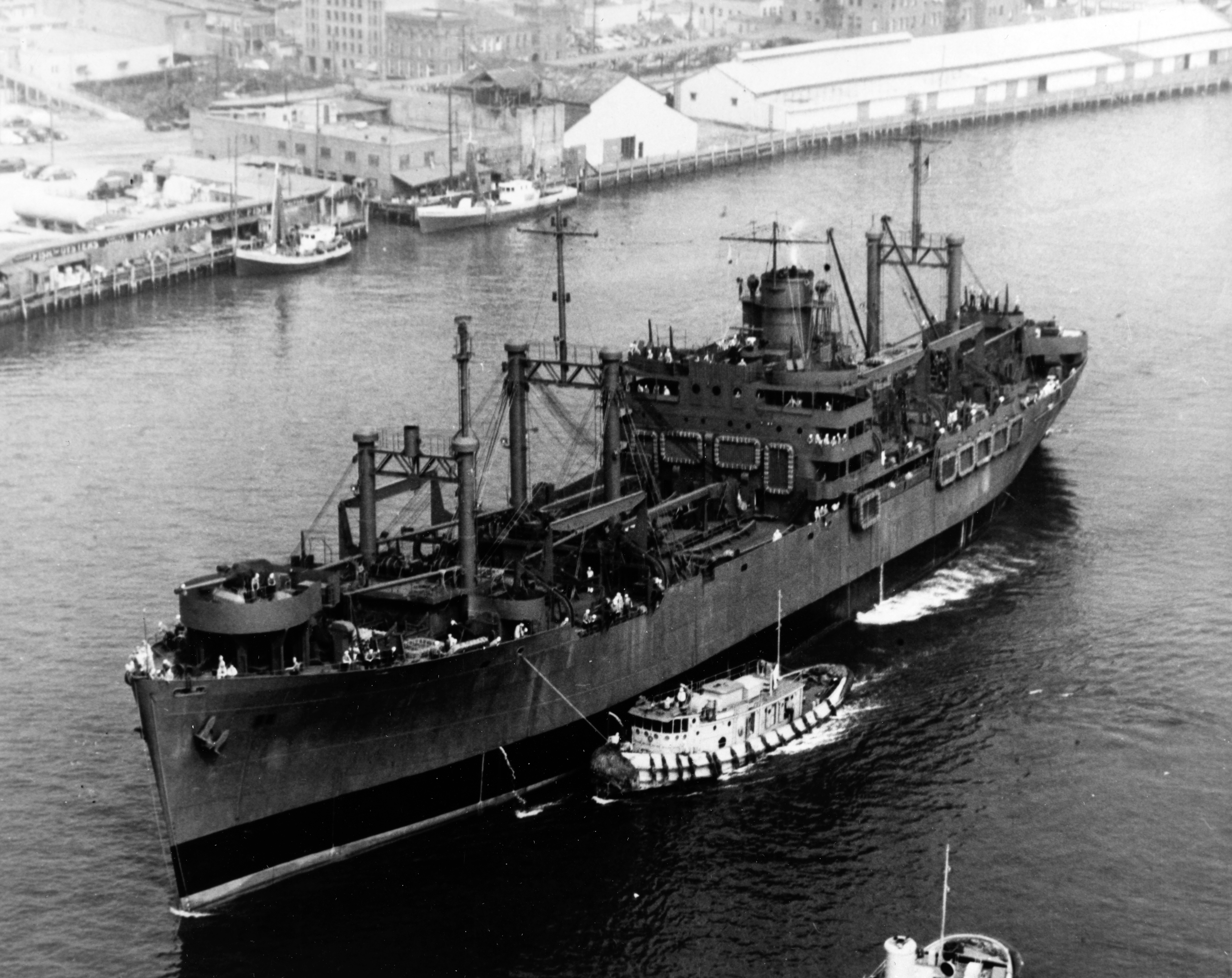
- Sumter in September 1943

History

United States
- Name: USS Sumter (APA-52)
- Namesake: Thomas Sumter, Revolutionary War General.
- Builder: Gulf Shipbuilding
- Laid down: 3 April 1942
- Launched: 4 October 1942
- Sponsored by: Mrs J. F. McRae
- Acquired: 30 April 1943
- Commissioned: 1 September 1943
- Decommissioned: 19 March 1946
- Reclassified: AP-97 to APA-52, 1 February 1943
- Stricken: 17 April 1946
- Identification: IMO number: 5126641
- Honours and awards: Six battle stars for World War II service
- Fate: Scrapped, October 1978

General characteristics
- Class & type: Sumter-class attack transport
- Displacement: 13,910 tons (fl)
- Length: 468 ft 8 in (142.85 m)
- Beam: 63 ft (19 m)
- Draft: 23 ft 3 in (7.09 m) (limiting)
- Propulsion: 1 × General Electric geared drive turbine, 2 Babcock & Wilcox header-type boilers, 1 propeller, designed shaft horsepower 6,000
- Speed: 16.5 knots
- Capacity: Troops: Officers 91, Enlisted 1,472; Cargo: 170,000 cu ft, 1,300 tons
- Complement: Officers 39, Enlisted 410
- Armament: 2 × 5 in (130 mm) dual-purpose gun mount; 4 × twin 40 mm gun mounts; (originally 8 × 1.1"/75 caliber gun mounts); 10 × single 20 mm gun mounts
- Notes: MCV Hull No. 474, hull type C2-S-E1

USS Sumter (APA-52) was a Sumter-class attack transport that served with the United States Navy from 1943 to 1946. She was subsequently sold into commercial service and was scrapped in 1978.

== History ==
APA-52 was the second US Navy vessel named Sumter. The ship was laid down on 3 April 1942 as Iberville by Gulf Shipbuilding of Chickasaw, Alabama, for the Waterman Steamship Company; launched on 4 October 1942; sponsored by Mrs. J. F. McRae; and acquired by the Navy on 30 April 1943 as AP-97. She was converted into an attack transport (APA-52) by the Maryland Drydock Company of Baltimore, Maryland, and commissioned on 1 September 1943.

Sumter sailed to Virginia and completed fitting out at the Norfolk Navy Yard. She then loaded a complement of 31 landing craft and a Beach Party unit before sailing to the West Coast where she became the flagship of Transport Division (TransDiv) 26. She spent most of December 1943 conducting landing exercises off San Clemente, California, with elements of the 25th Regimental Combat Team, 4th Marine Division.

=== Invasion of Marshall Islands ===
Sumter stood out of San Diego on 13 January 1944 en route to Lahaina Roads, Hawaii, to rendezvous with other units of Task Force (TF) 53, the Northern Attack Force for the Marshall Islands operation. She arrived there on 21 January and the force sortied the next day. Sumter and three other transports landed three battalion landing teams of the 25th Marines on the atolls of Ennumennet and Ennubirr on 31 January to establish field artillery positions in support of the main landings at Roi and Namur.

Sumter completed landing all of her troops by 3 February and sailed the next day for the South Pacific for amphibious training. After exercises in New Caledonia and the Ellice and Solomon Islands, she returned to Pearl Harbor on 8 April.

=== Invasion of Saipan ===
As a component of Task Group (TG) 54.4, Admiral R. K. Turner's Northern Attack Force for the invasion of Saipan and Tinian, the transport again loaded elements of the 4th Marine Division and sailed on 29 May. The attack force refueled at Eniwetok and was off the landing beaches at Saipan before daybreak on 15 June. Covered by an intensive air-sea bombardment, and receiving incoming fire from enemy artillery, mortars, and automatic weapons, the assault wave of marines landed at 0843.

The transport remained off the beaches until the 24th when she sailed to Eniwetok and Pearl Harbor. Before leaving Saipan, she had sent more supplies and equipment to Blue Beach One, treated wounded direct from the beaches and, prior to sailing, received on board an additional 85 battle casualties from LST-218.

=== Invasion of Palaus ===
Sumter arrived at Pearl Harbor on 21 July and trained there until 12 August when she was routed to Guadalcanal for additional amphibious exercises with the 81st Infantry Division. She sailed from Lunga Point, on 8 September, with the troops embarked to participate in the invasion of the Palau Islands.

After landing advance assault troops and a Beach Party at Angaur on the 15th, she stood off the island as the floating reserve for the 1st Marine Division's attack on Peleliu Island. The transport landed troops of the 81st Division on Angaur on 17 September and remained as a casualty evacuation ship until sailing to Manus, Admiralty Islands, on the 23d.

=== Invasion of the Philippines ===
Sumter was routed from there to Finschhafen, New Guinea, where she embarked men of the 10th Army Corps and sailed with Reinforcement Group 1 for the Philippine Islands. The troops were landed at San Pedro Bay on 2 October, two days after the initial assault. The ship steamed to Guam, loaded elements of the 77th army Division and disembarked them at Leyte on 23 November. She next steamed south to New Guinea and Sansapor. At the latter port, she loaded troops of the 6th Army Division and sailed with the San Fabian Attack Force on 30 December 1944 for the Lingayen Gulf area of the Philippines.

=== Invasion of Lingayen ===
On 8 January 1945 a kamikaze plane crashed into Callaway approximately 600 yards ahead of Sumter, and Sumter took over as formation guide. The next morning the assault troops, including those from Callaway, were landed on the Lingayen beaches. She steamed back to San Pedro three days later and made a turn around voyage back to Lingayen with reinforcements which were landed on the 27th. She sailed for Seeadler Harbor and voyage repairs, thence to the Solomon Islands.

=== Invasion of Okinawa ===
Sumter arrived at Guadalcanal on 19 February 1945 and began amphibious exercises with the 22d Regimental Combat Team of the 6th Marine Division in preparation for the invasion of Okinawa. She stood out of the Guadalcanal area on 14 March for Ulithi, Caroline Islands, where final staging was completed. The invasion force sortied on the 27th, and Sumter arrived off the beaches near Yontan Airfield in the early morning of 1 April. After landing 1,352 marines of the assault waves, the transport remained off the beach until sailing for the United States, via the Mariana Islands and Pearl Harbor, on 5 April.

Sumter arrived at San Pedro, California, on 30 April for overhaul. Following repairs, she trained in the San Diego area until 21 July when she sailed for the Philippine Islands loaded with army troops. After calling at the Marshall and Caroline Islands, the ship arrived in San Pedro Bay on 15 August, as hostilities with Japan ceased.

=== After hostilities ===
The transport embarked a contingent of the Army 33rd Infantry Division and departed for Japan on 9 September. The troops were landed at Wakayama, Honshū, on 25 September; and Sumter headed back to the Philippines for more Army occupation troops which were disembarked at Matsuyama, Japan. She returned to Subic Bay on 1 November and embarked Navy veterans for transportation to the United States.

Sumter arrived at Seattle, Washington, on 22 November 1945 and remained there until 25 January 1946 when she moved to San Pedro, California, to unload her landing craft. Five days later, she sailed from there for the East Coast, via the Panama Canal. The ship arrived at New Orleans on 15 February but left there the following month for Mobile, Alabama.

=== Decommission ===
Sumter was decommissioned on 19 March in the yard of the Gulf Shipbuilding Corp., Chickasaw, Alabama, and struck from the Navy List on 17 April 1946. She was returned to custody of the War Shipping Administration on 1 August 1946 for disposal.

=== Decorations ===
Sumter received six battle stars for World War II service.

== Commercial service ==
After being sold by the Navy, Sumter was converted into the first container ship, the SS Gateway City at Mobile SR Inc., of Chickasaw, Alabama in September 1957. She was scrapped at Hong Kong in October 1978.
