= Japanese submarine Ro-44 =

Kaichū-type submarine

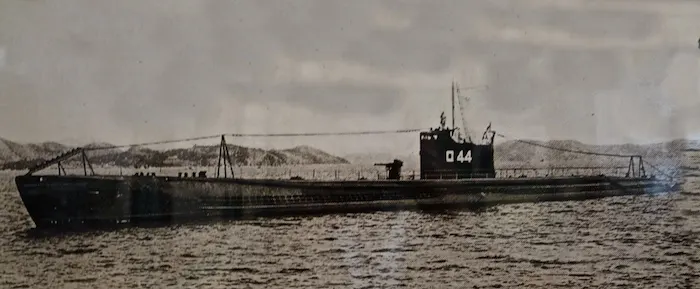

History

Japan
- Name: Submarine No. 385
- Builder: Mitsui Zosensho, Tamano, Japan
- Laid down: 14 February 1942
- Renamed: Ro-44 on 1 November 1942
- Launched: 11 November 1942
- Completed: 13 September 1943
- Commissioned: 13 September 1943
- Fate: Sunk 16 June 1944
- Stricken: 10 August 1944

General characteristics
- Class & type: Kaichū type submarine (K6 subclass)
- Displacement: 1,133 tonnes (1,115 long tons) surfaced; 1,470 tonnes (1,447 long tons) submerged
- Length: 80.5 m (264 ft 1 in) overall
- Beam: 7 m (23 ft 0 in)
- Draft: 4.07 m (13 ft 4 in)
- Installed power: 4,200 bhp (3,100 kW) (diesel); 1,200 hp (890 kW) (electric motor)
- Propulsion: Diesel-electric; 1 × diesel engine; 1 × electric motor
- Speed: 19.75 knots (36.58 km/h; 22.73 mph) surfaced; 8 knots (15 km/h; 9.2 mph) submerged
- Range: 5,000 nmi (9,300 km; 5,800 mi) at 16 knots (30 km/h; 18 mph) surfaced; 45 nmi (83 km; 52 mi) at 5 knots (9.3 km/h; 5.8 mph) submerged
- Test depth: 80 m (260 ft)
- Crew: 61
- Armament: 4 × bow 533 mm (21 in) torpedo tubes; 1 × 76.2 mm (3.00 in) L/40 anti-aircraft gun; 2 × single 25 mm (1.0 in) AA guns

Ro-44 was an Imperial Japanese Navy Kaichū type submarine of the K6 sub-class. Completed and commissioned in September 1943, she served in the central Pacific Ocean during World War II and was sunk on 16 June 1944 during her second war patrol.

== Design and description ==
The submarines of the K6 sub-class were versions of the preceding K5 sub-class with greater range and diving depth. They displaced 1,133 tonnes (1,115 long tons) surfaced and 1,470 tonnes (1,447 long tons) submerged. The submarines were 80.5 meters (264 ft 1 in) long, had a beam of 7 meters (23 ft 0 in) and a draft of 4.07 meters (13 ft 4 in). They had a diving depth of 80 meters (260 ft).

For surface running, the boats were powered by two 2,100-brake-horsepower (1,566 kW) diesel engines, each driving one propeller shaft. When submerged each propeller was driven by a 600-horsepower (447 kW) electric motor. They could reach 19.75 knots (36.58 km/h; 22.73 mph) on the surface and 8 knots (15 km/h; 9.2 mph) underwater. On the surface, the K6s had a range of 11,000 nautical miles (20,000 km; 13,000 mi) at 12 knots (22 km/h; 14 mph); submerged, they had a range of 45 nmi (83 km; 52 mi) at 5 knots (9.3 km/h; 5.8 mph).

The boats were armed with four internal bow 53.3 cm (21.0 in) torpedo tubes and carried a total of ten torpedoes. They were also armed with a single 76.2 mm (3.00 in) L/40 anti-aircraft gun and two single 25 mm (1.0 in) AA guns.

== Construction and commissioning ==
Ro-44 was laid down as Submarine No. 385 on 14 February 1942 by Mitsui Zosensho at Tamano, Japan. On 1 November 1942, she was renamed Ro-44, and she was attached provisionally to the Maizuru Naval District that day. She was launched on 11 November 1942 and was completed and commissioned on 13 September 1943.

== Service history ==
=== September 1943–January 1944 ===
Upon commissioning, Ro-44 was attached formally to the Maizuru Naval District and assigned to Submarine Squadron 11 for workups. During her work-ups, the commander of Submarine Squadron 11, Rear Admiral Noboru Ishizaki, arranged for her to test an experimental air-search radar borrowed from Kure Naval Air Station in the Iyo-nada in the Seto Inland Sea on 13 and 14 November 1943. After Ishizaki reported the results of the tests, he was rebuffed because he conducted them without the approval of the Navy Technical Department. Later in November 1943, Ro-44 moved from Kure to Maizuru.

On 25 December 1943, Ro-44 was reassigned to Submarine Division 34 in the 6th Fleet. She departed Maizuru in company with the submarine Ro-39 on 28 December 1943 bound for the Nechap submarine base at Truk, which she reached on 6 January 1944. She brought aboard provisions from the auxiliary submarine tender Heian Maru there on 12 January 1944.

=== First war patrol ===
Assigned a patrol area off Espiritu Santo in the New Hebrides, Ro-44 got underway from Truk at 16:30 on 15 January 1944, exiting the lagoon via South Pass to begin her first war patrol. While she was at sea, United States Navy Task Force 58 conducted Operation Hailstone, a major attack on Truk by carrier aircraft supported by anti-shipping sweeps around the atoll by surface warships, on 17 and 18 February 1944. Ro-44 was inbound to Truk at 13:26 Japan Standard Time (JST) on 17 February when she received orders to proceed to a position 40 nautical miles (74 km; 46 mi) northeast of Truk at flank speed to intercept a U.S. force of two battleships, two cruisers, and two destroyers Japanese forces had sighted in that area. A little over three hours later, at 16:47 JST, she received new orders to move to a position 40 nautical miles (74 km; 46 mi) northeast of Truk Lagoon′s Dublon Island, known to the Japanese as Natsushima ("Summer Island"). At 22:14 on 18 February 1944, while on the surface 32 nautical miles (59 km; 37 mi) from Dublon and bearing 066 degrees from the island, she sighted two unidentified aircraft and submerged. She reported the encounter in a message she transmitted at 22:55, which Fleet Radio Unit, Melbourne (FRUMEL), an Allied signals intelligence unit headquartered at Melbourne, Australia, intercepted, decrypted, and reported on 19 February 1944. On 21 February 1944, Ro-44 concluded her patrol, returning to Truk and anchoring off the Nechap submarine base.

=== Mili supply runs ===
On 28 February 1944, Ro-44 departed Truk to make a supply run to Mili Atoll in the Marshall Islands, carrying food in rubber containers tied down on her afterdeck, 25-mm anti-aircraft ammunition, mail, and a set of new codebooks for the garrison. Shortly after departure, however, all of the rubber containers went overboard in heavy seas and were lost, and Ro-44 returned to Truk.

On 2 March 1944, Ro-44 again left Truk, carrying 11 metric tons of food and ammunition and with orders to deliver her cargo to Mili and then conduct a reconnaissance of the U.S. fleet anchorage at Majuro during her return voyage to Truk. She had passed Jaluit and was approaching Mili from the west after dark on 9 March 1944 when she sighted a southeast-bound U.S. Navy task force made up of two aircraft carriers, a battleship, and a cruiser. She began an approach at 17:45 JST, but was too far away to launch an attack. She surfaced and pursued the ships for about an hour before losing contact. She sighted six U.S. destroyers at around 20:00 and submerged.

Ro-44 arrived off Mili on 11 March 1944, surfaced after dark, and entered the lagoon. She discharged her cargo, embarked 17 passengers, and quickly got back underway. As she approached Majuro on 13 March 1944 to conduct her reconnaissance, she sighted a red light ahead at 01:00 and submerged. As she closed on the atoll, she saw additional lights, leading her commanding officer to conclude that U.S. forces had constructed an airfield at Majuro. He then observed an aircraft carrier, eight battleships and several tank landing craft inside the lagoon. Ro-44 left the area at dawn on 13 March and later that day reported what she had seen to Truk. She arrived at Truk on 29 March 1944.

=== April–May 1944 ===
After Japanese forces reported an Allied task force off Kavieng on New Britain, Ro-44 departed Truk to operate in a holding area south of Truk to await further orders. She returned to Truk on 15 April 1944.

On 17 April 1944, 16 United States Army Air Forces (USAAF) B-24 Liberators raided Truk, and Ro-44 and the submarine Ro-42 submerged in the lagoon to avoid attack. Both submarines suffered minor damage from near-misses. On 20 April 1944, 17 USAAF B-24s attacked the anchorage, and Ro-44 and the other submarines present again submerged. When Ro-44 surfaced, her crew discovered that she had suffered periscope damage that could only be repaired in Japan. She departed Truk the same day bound for Kure, and soon was strafed by an American plane, suffering slight additional damage from the plane′s machine guns.

Ro-44 reached Kure on 29 April 1944 and began repairs and an overhaul, during which a Type 13 air-search radar was installed. After the work was complete, she departed Kure on 15 May 1944 and arrived at Saipan in the Mariana Islands on 19 May 1944.

=== Second war patrol ===
On 23 May 1944, Ro-44 put to sea from Saipan to begin her second war patrol. Her orders called for her to conduct a periscope reconnaissance of Eniwetok, which she did on 10 June 1944. After reporting what she had seen, she made for her assigned patrol area northeast of Eniwetok.

On 13 June 1944 the Combined Fleet activated Operation A-Go for the defense of the Mariana Islands, and that day the commander-in-chief of the 6th Fleet, Vice Admiral Takeo Takagi, ordered all available Japanese submarines to deploy east of the Marianas. Ro-44 was among them, receiving orders to proceed to the waters east of the Marianas at flank speed. The Battle of Saipan began with U.S. landings on Saipan on 15 June 1944, and Ro-44 transmitted a routine situation report that day. The Japanese never heard from her again.

=== Loss ===
Ro-44 was on the surface making 18 knots (33 km/h; 21 mph) 120 nautical miles (220 km; 140 mi) east of Eniwetok in the predawn darkness of 16 June 1944 when the U.S. Navy destroyer escort USS Burden R. Hastings (DE-19) — which was on a voyage from Majuro to Pearl Harbor, Hawaii — detected her on radar. Burden R. Hastings closed to 5,000 yards (4,600 m) and challenged her by Aldis lamp at 03:37. When Ro-44 did not reply, Burden R. Hastings fired four star shells to illuminate the area, and as the second shell burst, Ro-44 crash-dived.

At 03:54 Burden R. Hastings detected Ro-44 on sonar dead ahead at a range of 1,700 yards (1,600 m) and launched an unsuccessful Hedgehog attack. While Ro-44 made radical evasive maneuvers at a depth of 240 feet (73 m), Burden R. Hastings again gained sonar contact on her at a range of 1,500 yards (1,400 m) and conducted a second Hedgehog attack. Nine seconds later, her crew observed a bioluminescent flash in the water and felt a heavy underwater explosion. Burden R. Hastings passed over the location where her crew had observed the explosion and dropped four depth charges, two set to explode at 200 feet (61 m) and the other two at 300 feet (91 m). Five seconds after the last depth charge detonated, another large underwater explosion shook Burden R. Hastings, knocking out some of her electrical equipment. At dawn on 16 June 1944, Burden R. Hastings′s crew observed an oil slick and debris on the surface at 11°13′N 164°15′E. One of her boats recovered debris which identified the sunken submarine as Ro-44.

On the day she was sunk, Ro-44 was ordered to move to a new patrol area southeast of the Marianas. She did not acknowledge the orders, and on 12 July 1944 the Imperial Japanese Navy declared her to be presumed lost off Saipan with the loss of all 72 men on board. She was stricken from the Navy list on 10 August 1944.
