= Japanese submarine Ro-39 =

Kaichū-type submarine

History

Japan
- Name: Submarine No. 205
- Builder: Sasebo Naval Arsenal, Sasebo, Japan
- Laid down: 8 August 1942
- Renamed: Ro-39
- Launched: 6 March 1943
- Completed: 12 September 1943
- Commissioned: 12 September 1943
- Fate: Sunk 1 February 1944
- Stricken: 30 April 1944

General characteristics
- Class & type: Kaichū type submarine (K6 subclass)
- Displacement: 1,133 tonnes (1,115 long tons) surfaced; 1,470 tonnes (1,447 long tons) submerged
- Length: 80.5 m (264 ft 1 in) overall
- Beam: 7 m (23 ft 0 in)
- Draft: 4.07 m (13 ft 4 in)
- Installed power: 4,200 bhp (3,100 kW) (diesel); 1,200 hp (890 kW) (electric motor)
- Propulsion: Diesel-electric; 1 × diesel engine; 1 × electric motor
- Speed: 19.75 knots (36.58 km/h; 22.73 mph) surfaced; 8 knots (15 km/h; 9.2 mph) submerged
- Range: 5,000 nmi (9,300 km; 5,800 mi) at 16 knots (30 km/h; 18 mph) surfaced; 45 nmi (83 km; 52 mi) at 5 knots (9.3 km/h; 5.8 mph) submerged
- Test depth: 80 m (260 ft)
- Crew: 61
- Armament: 4 × bow 533 mm (21 in) torpedo tubes; 1 × 76.2 mm (3.00 in) L/40 anti-aircraft gun; 2 × single 25 mm (1.0 in) AA guns

Ro-39 was an Imperial Japanese Navy Kaichū type submarine of the K6 sub-class. Completed and commissioned in September 1943, she served in World War II and was sunk on 1 February 1944 during her first war patrol off Wotje with all 70 hands onboard lost.

== Design and description ==
The submarines of the K6 sub-class were versions of the preceding K5 sub-class with greater range and diving depth. They displaced 1,133 tonnes (1,115 long tons) surfaced and 1,470 tonnes (1,447 long tons) submerged. The submarines were 80.5 meters (264 ft 1 in) long, had a beam of 7 meters (23 ft 0 in) and a draft of 4.07 meters (13 ft 4 in). They had a diving depth of 80 meters (260 ft).

For surface running, the boats were powered by two 2,100-brake-horsepower (1,566 kW) diesel engines, each driving one propeller shaft. When submerged each propeller was driven by a 600-horsepower (447 kW) electric motor. They could reach 19.75 knots (36.58 km/h; 22.73 mph) on the surface and 8 knots (15 km/h; 9.2 mph) underwater. On the surface, the K6s had a range of 11,000 nautical miles (20,000 km; 13,000 mi) at 12 knots (22 km/h; 14 mph); submerged, they had a range of 45 nmi (83 km; 52 mi) at 5 knots (9.3 km/h; 5.8 mph).

The boats were armed with four internal bow 53.3 cm (21.0 in) torpedo tubes and carried a total of ten torpedoes. They were also armed with a single 76.2 mm (3.00 in) L/40 anti-aircraft gun and two single 25 mm (1.0 in) AA guns.

== Construction and commissioning ==
Ro-39 was laid down as Submarine No. 205 on 8 August 1942 by the Sasebo Navy Yard at Sasebo, Japan. She had been renamed Ro-39 by the time she was launched on 6 March 1943 and she was completed and commissioned on 12 September 1943.

== Service history ==
Upon commissioning, Ro-39 was attached to the Maizuru Naval District. On 25 December 1943 she was assigned to Submarine Division 34 in the 6th Fleet. In company with the submarine Ro-44, she departed Maizuru on 28 December 1943 bound for Truk, which she reached on 6 January 1944. At Truk, she took aboard stores from the auxiliary submarine tender Heian Maru on 17 January 1944.

Ro-38 got underway from Truk on 20 January 1944 with the commander of Submarine Division 34 aboard to begin her first war patrol, assigned a patrol area in the Caroline Islands in the vicinity of Woleai. On 22 January 1944, she received orders to rescue Imperial Japanese Navy Air Service aircrews of the 531st Naval Air Group at Woleai and the 755th Naval Air Group at Maloelap. With U.S. ships gathering for the invasion of the Marshall Islands, Ro-39 was ordered on 30 January 1944 to move to a patrol area 200 nautical miles (370 km; 230 mi) northeast of Wotje.

The United States Navy destroyer USS Walker (DD-517) gained radar contact on a vessel on the surface on the night of 1 February 1944. She closed with it and fired star shells which illuminated a submarine, probably Ro-39. The submarine crash-dived, but Walker picked it up on sonar and sank it with a single depth-charge attack at 09°24′N 170°32′E.

The 6th Fleet received a distress signal on 2 February 1944 at 10:38 Japan Standard Time that Ro-39 transmitted as she crash-dived, but it was indecipherable. On 6 February and again on 10 February 1944, the 6th Fleet ordered Ro-39 to return to Truk, but she did not acknowledge the order either time. On 5 March 1944, the Imperial Japanese Navy declared her to be presumed lost east of Wotje with all 70 hands. She was stricken from the Navy list on 30 April 1944.
