= Japanese submarine Ro-42 =

Kaichū-type submarine

History

Japan
- Name: Submarine No. 208
- Builder: Sasebo Naval Arsenal, Sasebo, Japan
- Laid down: 27 April 1942
- Renamed: Ro-42 on 25 September 1942
- Launched: 25 October 1942
- Completed: 31 August 1943
- Commissioned: 31 August 1943
- Fate: Sunk 11 June 1944
- Stricken: 10 August 1944

General characteristics
- Class & type: Kaichū type submarine (K6 subclass)
- Displacement: 1,133 tonnes (1,115 long tons) surfaced; 1,470 tonnes (1,447 long tons) submerged
- Length: 80.5 m (264 ft 1 in) overall
- Beam: 7 m (23 ft 0 in)
- Draft: 4.07 m (13 ft 4 in)
- Installed power: 4,200 bhp (3,100 kW) (diesel); 1,200 hp (890 kW) (electric motor)
- Propulsion: Diesel-electric; 1 × diesel engine; 1 × electric motor
- Speed: 19.75 knots (36.58 km/h; 22.73 mph) surfaced; 8 knots (15 km/h; 9.2 mph) submerged
- Range: 5,000 nmi (9,300 km; 5,800 mi) at 16 knots (30 km/h; 18 mph) surfaced; 45 nmi (83 km; 52 mi) at 5 knots (9.3 km/h; 5.8 mph) submerged
- Test depth: 80 m (260 ft)
- Crew: 61
- Armament: 4 × bow 533 mm (21 in) torpedo tubes; 1 × 76.2 mm (3.00 in) L/40 anti-aircraft gun; 2 × single 25 mm (1.0 in) AA guns

Ro-42 was an Imperial Japanese Navy Kaichū type submarine of the K6 sub-class. Completed and commissioned in August 1943, she served in World War II and was sunk in June 1944 during her third war patrol.

== Design and description ==
The submarines of the K6 sub-class were versions of the preceding K5 sub-class with greater range and diving depth. They displaced 1,133 tonnes (1,115 long tons) surfaced and 1,470 tonnes (1,447 long tons) submerged. The submarines were 80.5 meters (264 ft 1 in) long, had a beam of 7 meters (23 ft 0 in) and a draft of 4.07 meters (13 ft 4 in). They had a diving depth of 80 meters (260 ft).

For surface running, the boats were powered by two 2,100-brake-horsepower (1,566 kW) diesel engines, each driving one propeller shaft. When submerged each propeller was driven by a 600-horsepower (447 kW) electric motor. They could reach 19.75 knots (36.58 km/h; 22.73 mph) on the surface and 8 knots (15 km/h; 9.2 mph) underwater. On the surface, the K6s had a range of 11,000 nautical miles (20,000 km; 13,000 mi) at 12 knots (22 km/h; 14 mph); submerged, they had a range of 45 nmi (83 km; 52 mi) at 5 knots (9.3 km/h; 5.8 mph).

The boats were armed with four internal bow 53.3 cm (21.0 in) torpedo tubes and carried a total of ten torpedoes. They were also armed with a single 76.2 mm (3.00 in) L/40 anti-aircraft gun and two single 25 mm (1.0 in) AA guns.

== Construction and commissioning ==
Ro-42 was laid down as Submarine No. 208 on 27 April 1942 by the Sasebo Navy Yard at Sasebo, Japan. She was renamed Ro-42 on 25 September 1942 and was attached provisionally to the Maizuru Naval District that day. She was launched on 25 October 1942 and was completed and commissioned on 31 August 1943.

== Service history ==
Upon commissioning, Ro-42 was attached formally to the Maizuru Naval District and assigned to Submarine Squadron 11 for workups. On 30 November 1943, she was reassigned to Submarine Division 34 in the 6th Fleet, and on 4 December 1943 she departed Maizuru, Japan, bound for Truk, which she reached on 12 December 1943.

=== First war patrol ===
Ro-40 got underway from Truk on 23 December 1943 to begin her first war patrol, assigned a patrol area off Espiritu Santo in the New Hebrides. She was 200 nautical miles (370 km; 230 mi) east of Espiritu Santo on 14 January 1944 when she torpedoed the 800-ton United States Navy fuel oil barge USS YO-159, which her commanding officer had mistaken for a 10,000-ton fleet oiler, at 15°27′S 171°28′E. YO-159 suffered such serious damage that U.S. forces later scuttled her. Ro-42 returned to Truk on 24 January 1944. She took aboard torpedoes from the auxiliary submarine tender Heian Maru there on 28 January 1944.

=== Operation Hailstone ===
During Ro-42′s stay at Truk, U.S. Navy Task Force 58 conducted Operation Hailstone, a major attack on Truk by carrier aircraft supported by anti-shipping sweeps around the atoll by surface warships, on 17 and 18 February 1944. Ro-42 and the submarines I-10 and Ro-36 put to sea on 17 February in an attempt to intercept the attacking ships. Ro-42 was unsuccessful, and returned to Truk on 19 February 1944.

=== Second war patrol ===
Ro-42 began her second war patrol on 25 February 1944, departing Truk to head for a patrol area east of Kusaie. On 1 March she received orders to conduct a reconnaissance of Kwajalein and then move to a new patrol area 120 nautical miles (220 km; 140 mi) southeast of Kwajalein. After she arrived off Kwajalein, she reported on 4 March 1944 that the island′s waters were too heavily patrolled by Allied patrol boats for her to approach it for a reconnaissance. Ro-42 also began to suffer from malfunctioning equipment. She was ordered to return to her patrol.

Ro-42 was 40 nautical miles (74 km; 46 mi) southwest of Mili Atoll in the Marshall Islands when she sighted a convoy of six transports at 08:00 on 6 March 1944. WHile 70 nautical miles (130 km; 81 mi) southwest of Mili on 15 March 1944, she reported sighting a battleship and five aircraft carriers of U.S. Navy Task Group 50.10, prompting the commander-in-chief of the 6th Fleet, Vice Admiral Takeo Takagi, to order the submarines Ro-36 and Ro-44 to intercept the ships.

On 16 March 1944, Ro-42 received orders to move 100 nautical miles (190 km; 120 mi) to the west-southwest, and on 18 March to move another 80 nautical miles (150 km; 92 mi) to the west. She was 240 nautical miles (440 km; 280 mi) south of Ponape on 21 March 1944 when she sighted a three-ship convoy. On 23 March 1944, she and the submarines I-16, Ro-36, Ro-41, Ro-43, Ro-44, and Ro-108 were ordered to intercept a U.S. Navy task force that the submarine I-32 had sighted 60 nautical miles (110 km; 69 mi) north of Jaluit Atoll that day. She did not find the task force, and she returned to Truk on 28 March 1944.

=== April–May 1944 ===
Ro-42 got underway from Truk in company with the submarines I-174, Ro-36, Ro-48, and Ro-108 on 12 April 1944 to intercept an Allied task force Japanese forces had sighted north of Kavieng. She returned to Truk on 14 April. On 23 April 1944 she departed Truk bound for Yokosuka, Japan, which she reached on 30 April 1944.

On 15 May 1944, Ro-42 departed Yokosuka with the commander of Submarine Division 34 embarked and orders to conduct a reconnaissance of the American fleet anchorage at Majuro and then proceed to an area north-northeast of Kwajalein. While she was at sea, she received orders to postpone the Majuro reconnaissance until 10 June 1944. On 10 June 1944, she was operating in the Marshall Islands when she was ordered to reconnoiter both Majuro and Kwajalein.

=== Loss ===
Ro-42 was on the surface 40 nautical miles (74 km; 46 mi) east of Roi-Namur at 23:30 on 10 June 1944 when the destroyer escort USS Bangust (DE-739) detected her on radar. After Bangust closed, made visual contact, and flashed a challenge, Ro-42 crash-dived. Bangust searched for the submerged Ro-42 for the next eight hours and regained contact on sonar on the morning of 11 June 1944. Bangust conducted three unsuccessful 24-projectile Hedgehog attacks as Ro-42 made evasive maneuvers such as frequent hard turns and sudden changes in speed. However, her fourth Hedgehog attack resulted in a large underwater explosion that damaged Bangust′s hull. Ro-42 tried to surface, but failed, and sank at 10°05′N 168°22′E. During the morning of 11 June, a large oil slick was sighted on the surface.

On 13 June 1944 the Combined Fleet activated Operation A-Go for the defense of the Mariana Islands, and that day Vice Admiral Takagi ordered all available Japanese submarines to deploy east of the Marianas, with Ro-42 ordered to head there at flank speed. On 16 June 1944, she was assigned to Submarine Group B and ordered to move to an area southeast of the Marianas, and on 22 June 1944 she was ordered to return to Truk. She acknowledged none of the orders. On 12 July 1944, the Imperial Japanese Navy declared Ro-42 to be presumed lost with all 73 hands. She was stricken from the Navy list on 10 August 1944.

Some historians have identified a Japanese submarine the U.S. submarine USS Sea Devil (SS-400) sank on 16 September 1944 east of Japan as Ro-42, but the submarine Sea Devil sank probably was I-364.
