= USS Baxter =

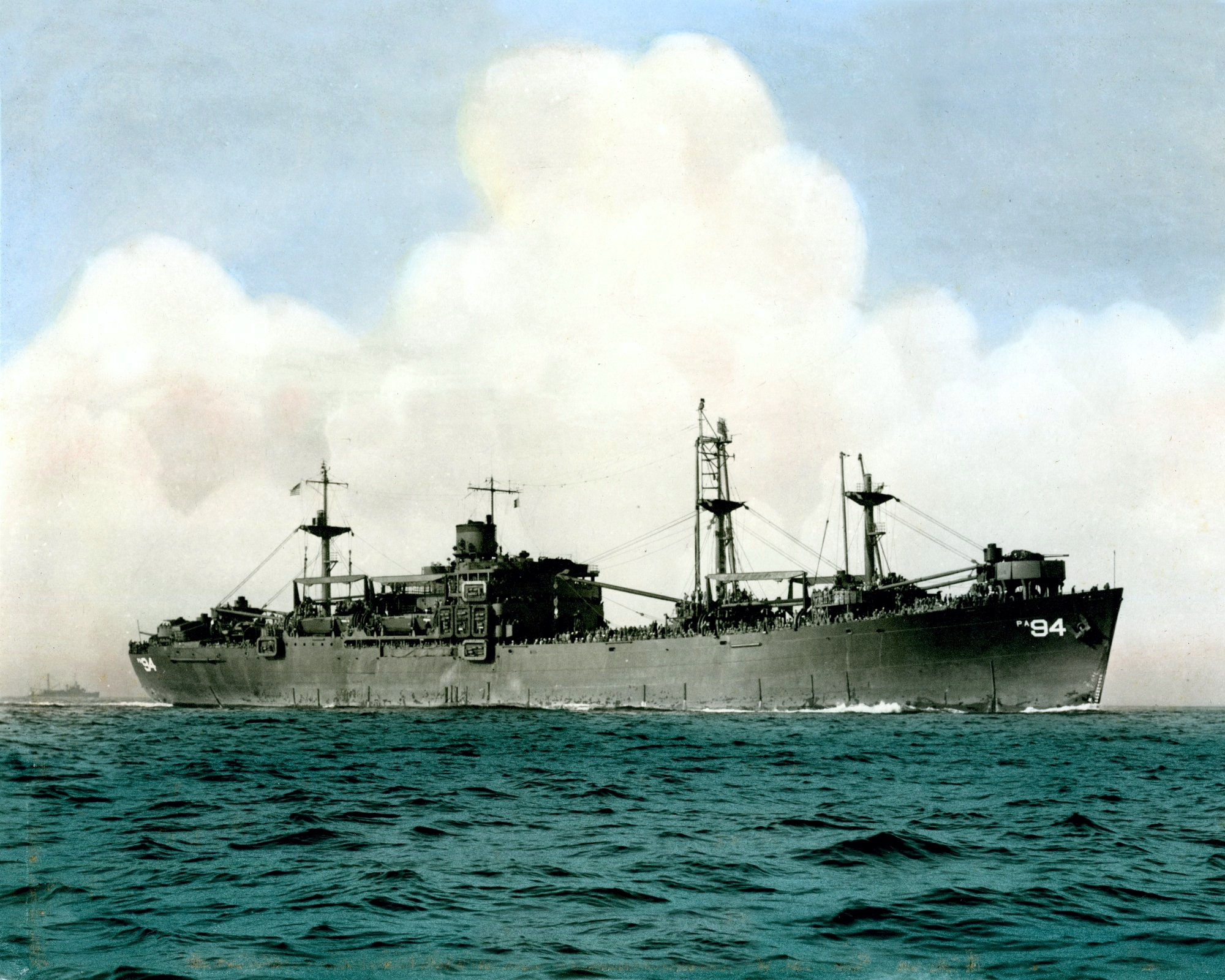
- Baxter circa in early 1946

History

United States
- Name: USS Baxter (APA-94)
- Namesake: Baxter County, Arkansas
- Builder: Gulf Shipbuilding
- Laid down: 18 March 1943
- Launched: 19 September 1943
- Sponsored by: Mrs R. S. Hendry
- Acquired: 30 November 1943
- Commissioned: 15 May 1944
- Decommissioned: 22 March 1946
- Stricken: 17 April 1946
- Honours and awards: Four battle stars for World War II service
- Fate: Scrapped, 1968

General characteristics
- Class & type: Sumter-class attack transport
- Displacement: 8591 tons (lt?), 13,910 tons (fl)
- Length: 468 ft 8 in
- Beam: 63 ft
- Draft: 23 ft 3 in (limiting)
- Propulsion: 1 × General Electric geared drive turbine, 2 Babcock & Wilcox header-type boilers, 1 propeller, designed shaft horsepower 6,000
- Speed: 16.5 knots
- Capacity: Troops: Officers 95, Enlisted 1,422; Cargo: 170,000 cu ft, 1,450 tons
- Complement: Officers 56, Enlisted 498
- Armament: 2 × 5"/38 caliber dual-purpose gun mount; 4 × twin 40 mm gun mounts (originally 8 × 1.1-inch/75-caliber guns), 10 × single 20 mm gun mounts
- Notes: MCV Hull No. 483, hull type C2-S-E1

USS Baxter (APA-94) was a Sumter-class attack transport in service with the United States Navy from 1944 to 1946. She was subsequently sold into merchant service and was finally scrapped in 1968.

== History ==
Baxter was launched 19 September 1943 by Gulf Shipbuilding at Chickasaw, Alabama, as Antinous under a Maritime Commission contract, transferred to the Navy 30 November 1943; placed in reduced commission the same day, sailed to New York and placed out of commission for conversion at Atlantic Basin Iron Works, Brooklyn, New York, recommissioned 15 May 1944 and reported to the Pacific Fleet.

=== World War II ===
Between 11 July and 7 August 1944 Baxter made three voyages between the west coast and Pearl Harbor transporting troops and cargo.

==== Invasion of Leyte ====
In August she commenced training exercises in the Hawaiian Islands in preparation for the first assaults against the Philippines. Between 20 October and 18 November 1944 she participated in the Leyte operation, landing several hundred troops.

==== Invasion of Luzon ====
Baxter got underway from Manus, Admiralty Islands 31 December 1944 with troops and cargo and again steamed toward the Philippines. On 9 January 1945 she unloaded her troops and equipment in the initial assault against the beaches of Lingayen Gulf, Luzon. She departed the same day and proceeded to Leyte Gulf. On 29 January she took part in the landings at San Felipe, Luzon, and left for Leyte the same day.

==== Invasion of Okinawa ====
Early in March she embarked troops of the 7th Infantry Division and between 14 and 21 March engaged in training exercises. On 27 March she departed the Philippines for Okinawa where she provided logistic support for the initial stages of the operation (1–6 April 1945). On 6 April she departed for San Francisco arriving on the 30th.

From June 1945 until February 1946 Baxter made six voyages between west coast ports and the islands of the Western Pacific, and later Japan.

=== Decommissioning ===
On 22 March 1946 Baxter was decommissioned and returned to the Maritime Commission.

=== Commercial service ===
Baxter was sold for commercial service in 1947 to the Waterman Steamship Corporation of Mobile, Alabama, and renamed SS La Salle. She was scrapped in 1968.

== Awards ==
Baxter received three battle stars for her service in World War II.
