= USS Warren (APA-53) =

Ship built in 1943

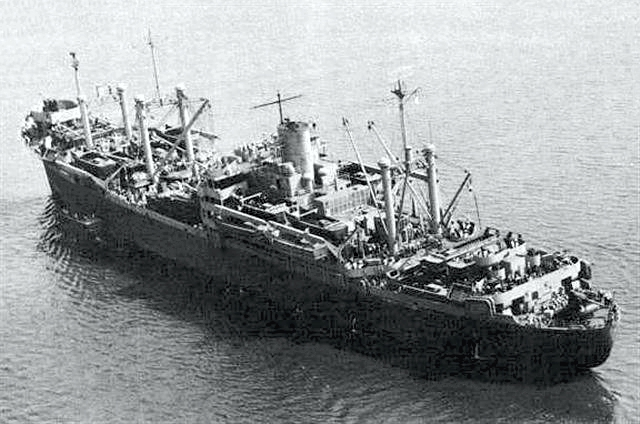
- USS Warren (APA-53) at Hampton Roads, 23 August 1943

History

United States
- Name: USS Warren (APA-53)
- Namesake: Joseph Warren, American Revolutionary War hero
- Builder: Gulf Shipbuilding
- Laid down: 19 April 1942
- Launched: 7 September 1942
- Sponsored by: Mrs F. L. (Laura) Leatherbury
- Acquired: 19 February 1943
- Commissioned: 2 August 1943
- Decommissioned: 14 March 1946
- Reclassified: AP-98 to APA-53, 1 February 1943
- Stricken: 17 April 1946
- Identification: IMO number: 5024374
- Honours and awards: Four battle stars for World War II service
- Fate: Sold into commercial service 1947, scrapped 1977

General characteristics
- Class & type: Sumter-class attack transport
- Displacement: 13,910 tons (fl)
- Length: 468 ft 8 in
- Beam: 63 ft
- Draft: 23 ft 3 in (limiting)
- Propulsion: 1 × General Electric geared drive turbine, 2 Babcock & Wilcox header-type boilers, 1 propeller, designed shaft horsepower 6,000
- Speed: 16.5 knots
- Capacity: Troops: Officers 93, Enlisted 1,400; Cargo: 170,000 cu ft (4,800 m^{3}), 1,300 tons
- Complement: Officers 38, Enlisted 619
- Armament: 2 × 5"/38 caliber dual-purpose gun mount, 4 × twin 40 mm gun mounts, 10 × single 20mm gun mounts
- Notes: MCV Hull No. 415, hull type C2-S-E1

USS Warren (APA-53) was a Sumter-class attack transport that served with the United States Navy during World War II. She was named for Founding Father and American Revolutionary War hero Joseph Warren.

Jean Lafitte – named for the legendary pirate of Barataria, Louisiana, who assisted General Andrew Jackson in defending New Orleans against the British in 1815 – was a C2-S-E1-type merchant ship laid down under a United States Maritime Commission contract (MC hull 475) on 19 April 1942 at Chickasaw, Alabama, by the Gulf Shipbuilding Corporation. She was launched on 7 September 1942; renamed Warren and classified a transport, AP-98; redesignated as an attack transport, APA-53, on 1 February 1943; and placed in commission, in ordinary, on 19 February 1943.

Taken to the Key Highway plant of the Bethlehem Steel Corporation soon thereafter, the ship was decommissioned on 10 March 1943; and was recommissioned on 2 August 1943.

== World War II ==
Warren soon sailed south to the Norfolk Navy Yard, where the work converting her to an attack transport was completed and she was fitted out for service. She next conducted her shakedown and type training in the waters of Chesapeake Bay. In intensive exercises, the ship practiced the amphibious tactics and techniques that she would soon be putting into practice.

On 1 November 1943, Warren departed Hampton Roads and headed for Panama, reaching the Canal Zone on the 5th after a brief stop at Guantanamo Bay, Cuba, en route. Following her transit of the Panama Canal, Warren pushed on for San Diego and reached that California port on 17 November. The ship subsequently underwent repairs and a drydocking at Long Beach before she returned to San Diego for more amphibious training. From 26 November 1943 to 13 January 1944, Warren landed troops of the 4th Marine Division in practice assaults at Aliso Canyon and San Clemente Island.

=== Invasion of Kwajalein ===
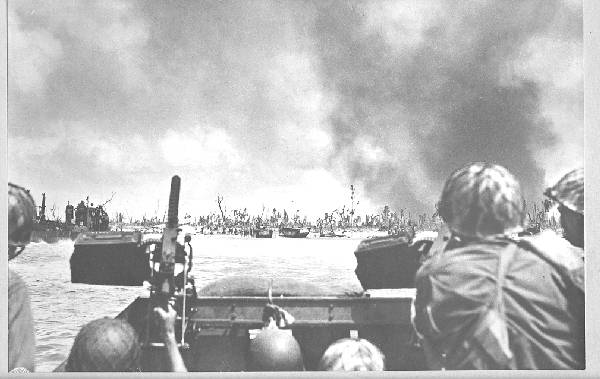
US troops going ashore at Kwajalein, 1944

On the latter day, Friday 13 January 1944, Warren sailed for the Central Pacific with men of the 1st Battalion, 25th Marine Regiment, 4th Marine Division, embarked. Steaming via the Hawaiian Islands, the attack transport arrived off the northern islets of Kwajalein Atoll in the Marshalls at dawn on 31 January.

The marines embarked in Warren were assigned the task of taking two small islands in the atoll, nicknamed "Ivan" and "Jacob." Those isles lay to the south of Roi and Namur, two heavily fortified areas of the atoll. Her marines were to secure both a guarded passage into the lagoon and artillery bases from which to soften up the defenses on the main islands, Roi and Namur, in support of the landings slated to take place the following day. The initial men ashore encountered minor opposition, and the casualties sustained were very light.

Warren eased into the lagoon on 1 February and continued the process of discharging munitions and cargo for her troops ashore. After a channel had been blasted through the coral, the attack transport's beach party supervised the arrival of supplies on "Ivan." Warren herself remained in the lagoon with other ships from her division for the next five days. Warren departed Kwajalein on 4 February, leaving the island still smoking "and reeking with the stench of unburied dead." As the ship's commanding officer later wrote, "we knew now the horror of war."

Sailing southward, the attack transport reached Funafuti in the Ellice Islands on 9 February, before she continued onward, arriving at Nouméa, New Caledonia, on 19 February. She ultimately weighed anchor from New Caledonian waters on 7 March and got underway for Guadalcanal – the scene of once-bitter fighting. She arrived off Lunga Point on the morning of the 10th and spent the majority of her days over the next three months in the Guadalcanal-Tulagi area. The only exceptions were trips to Kwajalein to pick up Marines from the 22nd Marine Regiment and to Cape Gloucester—where she landed the troops from elements of the Army's 40th Infantry Division and returned to the Russells with men of the 1st Marine Division embarked.

=== Invasion of Guam ===
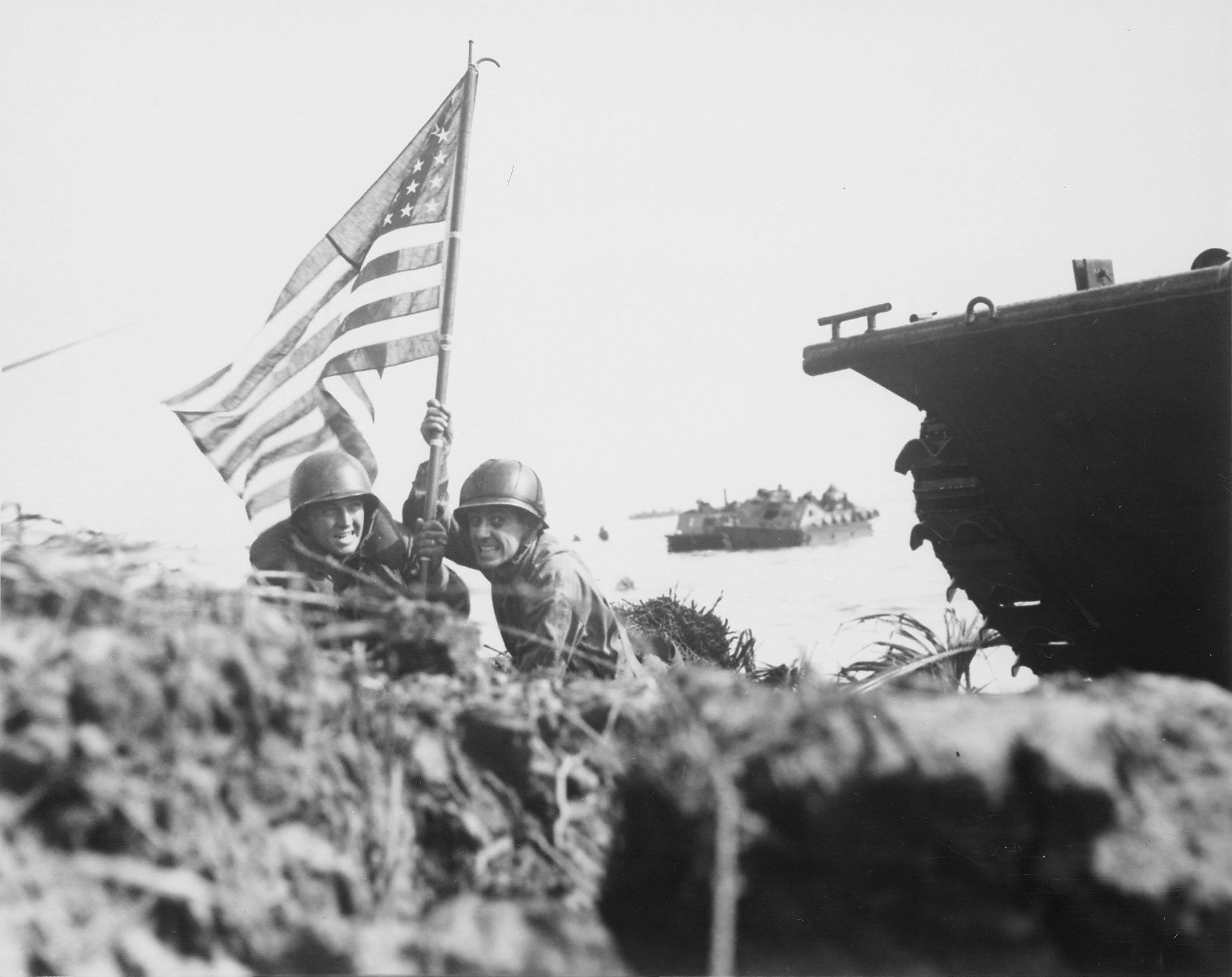
Raising the flag at Guam

At the end of May, Warren completed the loading of the men of the 3rd Battalion, 3rd Regiment, 3rd Marine Division, and headed north in convoy—her objective Guam, where she was to debark the Marines after their comrades had landed at Saipan in the Marianas.

However, because of the fierceness of the Japanese resistance on Saipan, Warren's mission was aborted; and she spent over a week cruising off that island, standing by with her Marines forming a reserve force. Ultimately, however, Warren's leathernecks were not needed, and the ship returned to Eniwetok, to commence a three-week stay in the Marshall Islands.

Warren then sailed for Guam, sending boatloads of men from the 3rd Marine Division ashore on 20 July. Over the ensuing five days, Warren remained off the bitterly contested beaches, her beach party lying pinned down in their foxholes ashore. "So perilous was the position on the Warren beach – the left flank of the assault", wrote Warren's commanding officer, "that supplies could not be landed there." Time and time again, Warren's hospital corpsmen exposed themselves to enemy fire evacuating wounded Marines, and the ship's boat crews went to the reef's edge to pick up men under enemy mortar fire.

=== Invasion of Peleliu ===
After departing Guam on 25 July, Warren evacuated marine casualties to Espiritu Santo. She then shifted to the Russell Islands in the Solomons, where she embarked men of the 1st Battalion, 1st Regiment, 1st Marine Brigade – combat veterans of the Guadalcanal campaign. The attack transport then took those combat-hardened marines to the island of Peleliu in the Palaus. Despite the carrier-based air strikes and intense bombardment which preceded the initial landings of 15 September, the marines who went ashore that day still met fierce resistance from the Japanese defenders. The enemy, firmly entrenched in caves and tunnels that honeycombed the hills overlooking the beach and the strategic airfield, proved difficult to dislodge.

Again, Warren's beach party worked to keep the supplies flowing from the ship to shore where they were needed, providing the necessary supplies and ammunition for the hard-pressed marines. Meanwhile, as the casualties began coming back to the ship, the attack transport's medical department worked diligently to save the wounded. Among the first ships to discharge her cargo, Warren remained offshore in the ensuing days, becoming a floating hospital, as doctors and corpsmen worked to sustain lives of men evacuated from "the flaming hell of Peleliu."

The routine remained almost the same during the days and nights that Warren lay off the beachhead. Each night there would be more burials at sea while the crew waited at battle stations for what became almost a regular visit by snooping Japanese planes. It was not until 22 September that Warren departed Pelelieu, bound for New Guinea.

=== Invasion of Leyte ===
She arrived at Hollandia on 25 September and stayed there until 15 October, when she embarked the men and equipment of the Army's 52nd Field Artillery, 24th Division Artillery, 24th Infantry Division. As part of TG 78.6, she subsequently sailed for the Philippine Islands, as General Douglas MacArthur made good his pledge to return – this time well-backed by ships, men, and planes – to the islands from which he had been forced to leave in 1942.

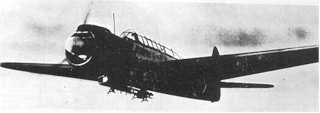
Japanese Nakajima B6N "Jill" torpedo bomber in flight

On 22 October – two days after the initial landings on Leyte commenced – Warren discharged her cargo and disembarked her troops before pulling out of the area that evening. Warren returned to Leyte on 14 November, this time with six Red Cross nurses in addition to the Army 1st Battalion, 127th Regiment, 32nd Infantry Division. The attack transport's commanding officer later recounted, "We all recalled that old superstition of the sea--'women on board ship bring bad luck'--when a Jap torpedo plane came close to hitting us with its deadly charge the afternoon before we sailed into Leyte Gulf." The enemy aircraft, a torpedo-carrying "Jill", bore in at the attack transport through flak. Only at the last instant a shell from the after 5-inch (130 mm) gun blew the right wing off the "Jill", sending the plane sliding past Warren's fantail and into the sea. Later that day, the attack transport witnessed other air attacks in her vicinity and watched while an Army Air Force Lockheed P-38 Lightning darted daringly through the flak to blow up a Japanese fighter in mid-air with a burst from her machine guns.

Leyte was still a hot target, so Warren's unloading was efficient and rapid, discharging her cargo within a few hours and getting underway that evening and then slipping away in the darkness, bound for New Guinea. After stopping at Manus, in the Admiralties, and Oro Bay, Warren reached Milne Bay, New Guinea, on 27 November. The attack transport remained at Milne Bay through Christmas Day.

=== Invasion of Luzon ===
Underway on 26 December 1944, Warren picked up her convoy at Manus and then set out for Leyte again on 2 January 1945. Nine days later, she reached Lingayen Gulf off Luzon where the ship lost the first members of her crew to enemy action.

The first boat to leave the ship during the landings carried half of Warren's beach party, along with several members of the Army shore party embarked. Due to the heavy smoke screen and a faulty boat compass, the landing craft landed on a Japanese held beach near the town of Damortis. It was a fatal mistake. Before it could get underway, the boat came under artillery, mortar, and machine gun fire, wrecking the vessel, killing several men, and wounding others. The remaining men abandoned the craft and began to swim away from the beach, but the Japanese automatic weapons opened up on them as they struggled to get out of range. Only 17 men out of 28 survived the deadly hail of fire. It was two hours before the survivors – many of them badly wounded – were picked up.

By their firing on Warren's boat, the Japanese gave away positions that pre-attack bombardments and bombings had not reached. Accordingly, the destroyer USS Russell (DD-414) and two fast transports moved in close and joined Army heavy artillery in bombarding the area until all opposition was completely silenced.

==== "Friendly fire" casualties ====
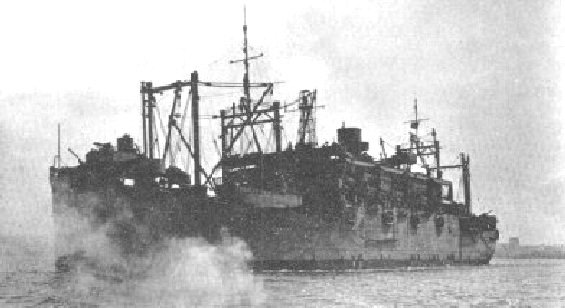
USS Zeilin (APA-3)

On the 13th, a Japanese plane came out of the clouds off the ship's port bow, apparently intent on crashing into Warren. Antiaircraft guns opened fire. While still several hundred yards away from the attack transport, the plane leveled off, swooped directly over Warren and headed for attack transport USS Zeilin (APA-3).

As Warren's men watched, horror-stricken, the kamikaze plunged headlong into Zeilin. Warren herself was raked by machine-gun fire from a "friendly" ship. Shells coming from the port quarter pounded the attack transport's port side. One man of her boat group, manning a gun in the cockpit in one of the ship's landing craft, was killed outright. On the flying bridge alone, there were 22 casualties.

Warren completed her unloading on 15 January and departed. Ultimately, the attack transport completed one last voyage carrying troops, landing the men of the 1st Battalion, 163rd Regiment, 41st Infantry Division, at Mindoro in the Philippines, after lifting them from Biak Island, New Guinea. Later discharging all surplus supplies and all but two of her landing craft, Warren steamed eastward via Eniwetok and stopped at Pearl Harbor on 18 March, before heading on toward the west coast of the United States on 20 March.

==== Transport mission to Okinawa ====
Reaching Portland, Oregon, on the 27th, Warren underwent an overhaul there, lasting into June 1945. Subsequently, shifting to San Diego and then to San Francisco, the attack transport departed the west coast on 24 June, bound for the Marshalls, and arrived at Eniwetok on 6 July. From there, she sailed via Ulithi to Okinawa and arrived off that island on 23 July. Over the next few days, Warren unloaded the men and material of the 66th Construction Battalion ("Seabees"), undergoing nearly constant air raid alerts as the enemy maintained its pressure on the invading Americans.

From 1 to 3 August, Warren steamed in circles off Okinawa, riding on the outer edge of a typhoon, and sailed for Ulithi on the 6th. Arriving at her destination soon thereafter, Warren lay at anchor in Ulithi lagoon when the word of Japan's capitulation was received.

=== After hostilities ===
Warren put into Cebu harbor to load units of the Army's Americal Division; but, before she embarked those troops, her orders were changed. Instead, she was to proceed to Manila. There, she embarked the troops of the Army's 43rd Division and headed for Tokyo Bay, reaching that body of water on 13 September, less than two weeks after the formal surrender ceremony on board the battleship USS Missouri (BB-63).

The attack transport subsequently sailed for Okinawa, where she embarked men of the 1st Battalion, 5th Regiment, 1st Marine Division, and their equipment. She sailed from Okinawan waters on 29 September and reached the mouth of the Taku River – the approaches to the city of Tientsin, China – on 2 October. She thus completed the second of her occupation tasks, disembarking the marines over the ensuing days.

Warren departed Taku Bar on 11 October and reached Manila a few days later. She then left Philippine waters for a three-day voyage across the South China Sea to the Gulf of Tonkin. Reaching Haiphong on 26 October, Warren embarked 1,800 troops of the Chinese 52nd Army before she departed that port, bound for Manchuria.

However, because of unsettled conditions between Chinese Communist and Nationalist forces in Manchuria – a part of the brewing Chinese Civil War that would reach its climax in the expulsion of the Nationalists from mainland China to Formosa in 1949 – Warren sailed instead to Chinwangtao, China, the seaport at the base of the Great Wall. There, she debarked her passengers on 7 November. Two days later, Warren dropped down the coast for her second visit to Taku and Tientsin.

==== Operation Magic Carpet ====
On 16 November, Warren sailed for Manila and participation in the mass movement of men back to the continental United States, Operation Magic Carpet. After lifting a contingent of seabees to Guam at the end of November, Warren streamed a "homeward bound" pennant on 1 December and set her course for the California coast.

=== Decommission ===
Reaching San Francisco on 17 December, Warren remained at that west coast port until 14 January 1946, when she got underway for New Orleans. Transiting the Panama Canal soon thereafter, Warren pushed on to the coast of the Gulf of Mexico. Decommissioned on 14 March 1946, Warren was struck from the Navy list on 17 April 1946 and turned over to the War Shipping Administration on 1 August of the same year at Mobile, Alabama.

=== Decorations ===
Warren received five battle stars for World War II service.

== Commercial service ==
Subsequently, acquired by the Waterman Steamship Corporation, the ship apparently kept her original name Jean Lafitte, for only a short time. Renamed Arizpa in 1947, the former attack transport was converted for merchant service and operated under the Waterman house flag until 1966, when she appeared on contemporary merchant vessels registers as operating with Litton Industries Leasing Corp. of Wilmington, Delaware.

Arizpa operated with Litton until 1976, when she was transferred to the Reynolds Leading Corp., also of Wilmington. At some stage she was converted into a container vessel for Sea-Land Service. She was reportedly scrapped at Brownsville, Texas in September 1977.
