= USS Wayne =

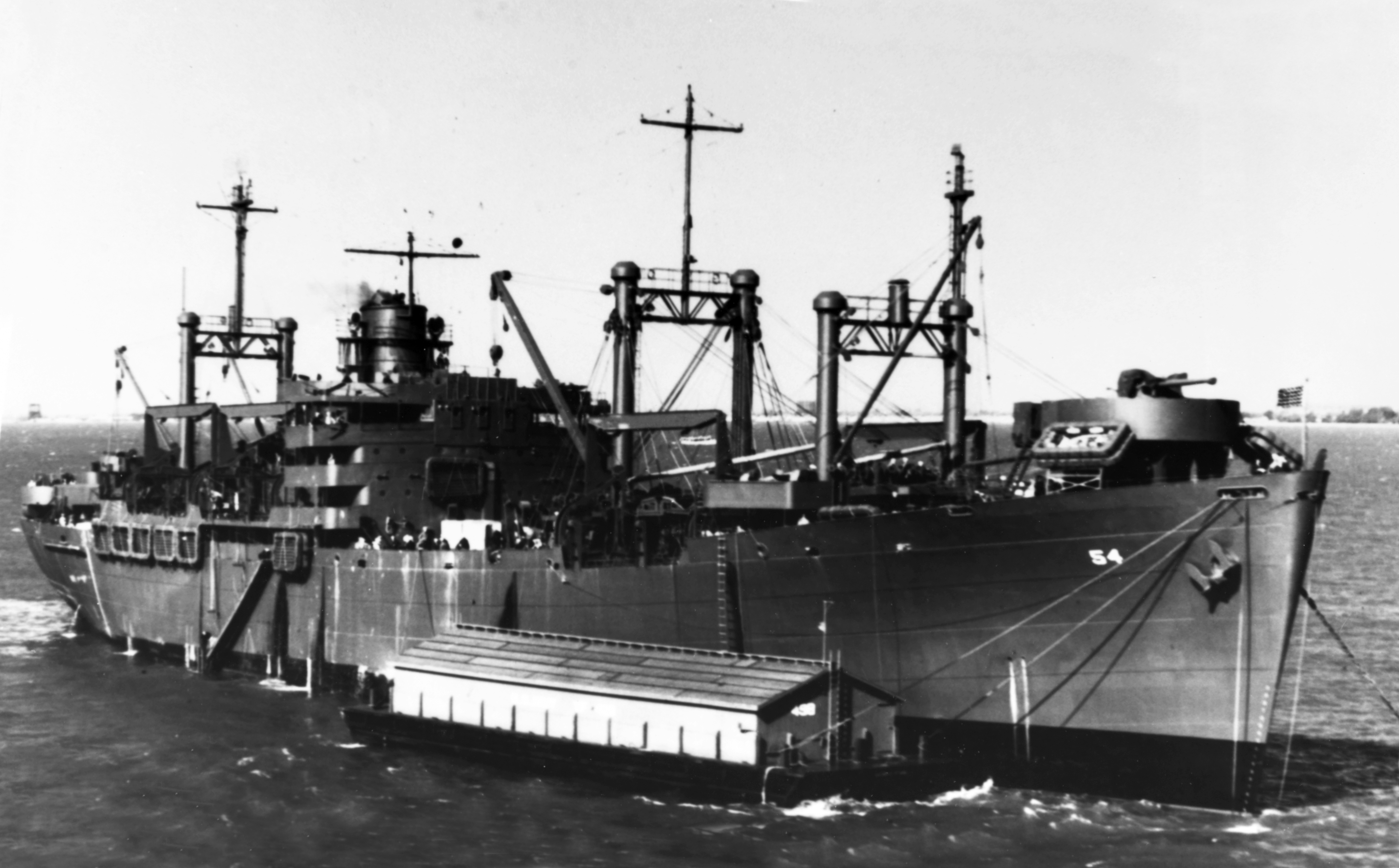

History

United States
- Name: USS Wayne (APA-54)
- Namesake: Wayne County, Georgia; Wayne County, Illinois; Wayne County, Indiana; Wayne County, Iowa; Wayne County, Kentucky; Wayne County, Michigan; Wayne County, Mississippi; Wayne County, Missouri; Wayne County, Nebraska; Wayne County, New York; Wayne County, North Carolina; Wayne County, Ohio; Wayne County, Pennsylvania; Wayne County, Tennessee; Wayne County, Utah; Wayne County, West Virginia
- Builder: Gulf Shipbuilding
- Laid down: 20 April 1942
- Launched: 6 December 1942
- Sponsored by: Mrs. N. G. Nicolson
- Acquired: 30 April 1943
- Commissioned: 27 August 1943
- Decommissioned: 16 March 1946
- Reclassified: AP-99 to APA-54, 1 February 1943
- Stricken: 17 April 1946
- Identification: IMO number: 5003966
- Honours and awards: Seven battle stars for World War II service
- Fate: Scrapped, May 1977

General characteristics
- Class & type: Sumter-class attack transport
- Displacement: 13,910 tons (fl)
- Length: 468 ft 8 in
- Beam: 63 ft
- Draft: 23 ft 3 in (limiting)
- Propulsion: 1 × General Electric geared drive turbine, 2 Babcock & Wilcox header-type boilers, 1 propeller, designed shaft horsepower 6,000
- Speed: 16.5 knots
- Capacity: Troops: Officers 93, Enlisted 1,340; Cargo: 170,000 cu ft, 1,300 tons
- Complement: Officers 57, Enlisted 478
- Armament: 2 × 5 in (130 mm) dual-purpose gun mounts; 4 × twin 40 mm gun mounts; (originally 8 × 1.1"/75 caliber guns); 10 × single 20 mm gun mounts
- Notes: MCV Hull No. 476, hull type C2-S-E1

USS Wayne (APA-54) was a Sumter-class attack transport that served with the US Navy during World War II.

Wayne was originally laid down as a type C2-S-E1 ship under Maritime Commission contract (MC hull 476), yard hull 7 (U.S. Official Number 251508) on 20 April 1942 as Afoundria at Chickasaw, Alabama, by the Gulf Shipbuilding Corporation. (Note: Confusingly yard hull 14, MC hull 482, was laid down as Afoundria (U.S. O/N 244018) (Confusing even to MARAD database builders as status card is for O/N 244018 and number in header is for the ship that became Wayne, O/N 251508.). The second Afoundria was completed 11 November 1943 and was operated by Waterman Steamship Company for the War Shipping Administration as a troop ship until 26 March 1946.) The ship was renamed Wayne and classified as a transport, AP-99, on 26 October 1942; launched on 6 December 1942; sponsored by Mrs. N. G. Nicolson; reclassified an attack transport, APA-54, on 1 February 1943; acquired by the Navy on 30 April 1943; delivered to the Navy the following day, 1 May 1943, and simultaneously placed in commission "in ordinary."

Taken to the Bethlehem Steel Corporation at Key Highway Yard, Baltimore, Maryland, Wayne was converted for naval service. Decommissioned on 11 May 1943 for the duration of the conversion work, Wayne (APA-54) was recommissioned at Baltimore on 27 August 1943.

== World War II ==
Wayne departed Baltimore on 1 September and headed down the eastern seaboard to Norfolk, Virginia., where she arrived the following day to take on fuel, stores, equipment and a full complement of landing craft. After shakedown training in Chesapeake Bay, Wayne departed Hampton Roads on 4 October, bound for New York. Upon finishing loading at New York, she put to sea on 13 October and, escorted by destroyer USS Doran (DD-634) and destroyer escort USS Canfield (DE-262), headed for the Pacific. The attack transport transited the Panama Canal on 21 and 22 October and arrived at Naval Base San Diego at the end of the month. For the remainder of 1943, Wayne operated out of San Diego on training exercises with various battalion landing teams of the 4th Marine Division.

On 13 January 1944, Wayne got underway with marines of the 3rd Battalion (Reinforced), 24th Marines embarked and steamed in convoy for the Hawaiian Islands. She arrived at Lahaina Roads, Maui, Territory of Hawaii, on the 21st. There, she fueled from oiler USS Tallulah (AO-50) and took on stores from store ship USS Pastores (AF-16). She departed Hawaiian waters two days later, bound for the Marshall Islands.

=== Invasion of Kwajalein ===
Arriving off Kwajalein on 30 January as part of the northern landing force, Wayne transferred her marines to LSTs which then carried them inside the lagoon to the beachhead. After retiring to the open sea at night, the attack transport returned to the transport area the next morning, lowered her boats, and commenced unloading cargo.

On the afternoon of 1 February, Wayne left the Marshalls and put in at Funafuti, in the Ellice Islands, on the 9th. Fueling there, Wayne and attack transport USS Elmore (APA-42) were detached from the homeward-bound convoy on the 17th, near Efate, in the New Hebrides, and anchored in Havannah Harbor. Nine days later, Wayne and her consort shifted to Guadalcanal. Wayne trained with marines in the Solomons before she moved to Nouméa, New Caledonia, on 21 March. Subsequently, after discharging naval passengers at Guadalcanal, she shifted to Emirau, St. Matthias Islands.

Wayne disembarked marine replacements for the garrison there on 11 April. That same day, she stood out of Emirau harbor on a return run to Guadalcanal with the 1st Battalion, 4th Marine Division, embarked. Wayne performed a similar reinforcement mission to New Britain where American forces had been fighting to push back Japanese troops since the previous December. At the time the attack transport arrived there, Allied troops had established a line about halfway across the island toward Rabaul and were awaiting more aid before continuing the push.

On 18 April, Wayne began embarking men of the 213th Field Artillery Battalion, 4th Marine Division, and on the 20th stood out to relieve the 1st Marine Division on New Britain, arriving on 23 April. Wayne then began a complicated cargo and man-handling task. While troops and equipment of the 213th Field Artillery Battalion were being disembarked and unloaded on one side of the ship, men of the 4th Battalion, 11th Marines, were being embarked on the other. Completing that assignment on the 25th, Wayne sailed to the Russells, where she unloaded cargo and disembarked more troops on the 28th before moving on to Guadalcanal the same day. From 10 May to 3 June, Wayne trained at Guadalcanal.

=== Invasion of Saipan ===
On 4 June, the attack transport stood out for Kwajalein – the staging area for the forthcoming Marianas campaign – and, from the 9th to the 12th, participated in staging and rehearsal operations. On the latter day, Wayne got underway for the Marianas. Her embarked Marines – 1st Battalion, 21st Marines, 3rd Marine Division – were earmarked to land at Guam if not needed at Saipan.

On 15 June, transports under Vice Admiral Richmond K. Turner landed Marines under the command of Lt. Gen. Holland M. Smith, USMC, on Saipan, covered by intensive naval gunfire and carrier-based air support. Wayne steamed offshore for several days after the initial assault. During the Battle of the Philippine Sea, which took place between the 19th and the 21st, Wayne remained on station about 250 miles east of Guam, while the action was taking place some 500 miles to the west of the island. On 25 June, her troops as yet unused, the attack transport – part of Task Group 53 (TG 53) – was ordered to retire to the Marshalls to await further orders.

=== Invasion of Guam ===
Wayne remained at anchor in Eniwetok lagoon from the end of June through mid-July. Underway on 17 July, the attack transport proceeded to Guam, where she arrived three days later. There, she witnessed part of the intensive preinvasion shelling by the gunfire support ships in the task force under Rear Admiral R. L. Conolly. Carrier-based air attacks also assisted in the "softening up" process.

At 08:28 on 21 July, Wayne's embarked marines headed for shore in the first wave of the invasion. The attack transport completed her unloading of equipment on the morning of the 23rd. During her stay, she received 177 wounded troops from the beaches, and her medical department rendered sterling work in the care and treatment of those men. Wayne stood by for two additional days after finishing her unloading before departing the Marianas on the 25th and carrying 165 wounded fighting men to Espiritu Santo, in the New Hebrides. Putting into Espiritu Santo on 5 August, Wayne discharged her disabled passengers and stood by to await further orders.

=== Invasion of Peleliu ===
The attack transport remained at anchor in the New Hebrides until 14 August, when she shifted to Guadalcanal, en route to Renard Sound, in the Russell Islands, where the 1st Marine Division was encamped. From the 17th to the 26th, Wayne carried out practice landings in preparation for the next operation, the assault on the Palau Islands. On 26 August, the attack transport sailed with TG 32.3 and devoted the ensuing days of the voyage to drills and briefings for the upcoming landings.

On the morning of 15 September, marines of the 1st Marine Division moved ashore at Peleliu. Wayne's troops were among those who landed that morning. They were later followed by boatloads of high-priority cargo: ammunition and medical supplies. By 11:00, three and one-half hours after the initial waves waded ashore, the first of the casualties began to arrive back on the ship for medical treatment, evidence of the intense and bloody struggle going on ashore. Japanese guns swept the beaches and waters offshore with deadly accuracy. Casualties among the marines and boat crews were high. In the days that followed, Wayne kept up a steady pace of discharging cargo and receiving casualties during the day and retiring seaward at night.

On the night of 20 September, she was ordered to move close inshore to serve as casualty evacuation ship, 1,000 yards off the reef. As the attack transport closed the island, enemy artillery opened up, lobbing two shells over the ship. Later during the night, machine gun fire from Japanese guns passed overhead. Wayne retired from the Palaus on 21 September and proceeded to Humboldt Bay, New Guinea. Between 1 and 12 October, Wayne participated in staging operations, including loading troops of the 2d Battalion, 19th Infantry, 24th Division, USA, and their equipment on the 8th and a practice landing at Sko Skai beach, eight miles east of Humboldt Bay, on the 12th.

=== Invasion of Leyte ===
On the morning of the 13th, the attack transport got underway for Leyte, Philippines, and arrived off the town of Palo on the 20th, the first day of the invasion. An enemy plane, a twin-engined "Nick", passed by the ship and was taken under fire by Wayne's 5-inch battery for a brief time before it dove steeply over friendly ships astern.

As the ship's commanding officer later recounted, the landings on Leyte were "accomplished with surprising ease." The beach upon which Wayne had landed her troops and equipment had been "... lightly defended at best ...", facilitating a rapid unloading. The operation was not without cost to the ship, however, as a Japanese gun scored a direct hit on one of the ship's LCVP landing craft, killing some of the Army personnel embarked and slightly wounding the boat's coxswain.

By 16:00 on D-Day, all cargo and troops had been unloaded, and Wayne got underway for Humboldt Bay – but only to return to Leyte with troops of the 1st Battalion, 128th Infantry, 32nd Infantry Division, together with their cargo.

Departing Dutch New Guinean waters on 9 November, the attack transport arrived off Leyte on the 13th. While no enemy planes made an appearance close to Wayne that morning, a solitary "Jill", carrying a torpedo, attacked the convoy to which she was attached. At 17:00, the enemy aircraft appeared forward of the convoy, briefly took a parallel course to it, and then when aft of Wayne's position, banked to starboard and began a low-altitude run on LSV USS Catskill (LSV-1). The torpedo missed, but Catskill's gunners did not and the raider splashed into the sea. Later that day, more enemy aircraft appeared in the vicinity, prompting the ships to go to general quarters, but did not come close enough to draw fire. By the time the word came to secure from general quarters, the convoy was in approach disposition in Leyte Gulf.

==== Aircraft kill ====
At 07:35 on the 14th, Wayne's lookouts observed three "Zeke" fighters forward of the ship at a range of 7,000 yards. The planes maneuvered back and forth, closing the range steadily and drawing fire from the ships of the convoy. Wayne's forward 5-inch gun managed to get off one round to include in the scattered gunfire. Apparently the antiaircraft barrage sufficed to force the enemy to stay out of range. Attracted by the firing, American P-38s soon showed up and downed two of the "Zekes." The third "Zeke", however, returned to the area, going into a strafing dive.

At a range of 400 yards, the plane swooped low at 150 feet altitude. Wayne's starboard guns opened fire and tracers began striking the plane. The "Zeke" changed course, crossing Wayne's bow at 200 yards. The attack transport's port batteries now commenced firing, scoring hits. Flames burst from the fuselage, and the "Zeke" executed a fatal wingover and spun out of control into the sea.

Within the space of a day, Wayne unloaded her cargo and disembarked her troops and, by 16:30 on the 14th, was ready for sea, her boats hoisted on board and secured. Departing that day, the attack transport moved to Seeadler Harbor, at Manus, in the Admiralties. Provisioning and taking on fuel after her arrival there on the 20th, Wayne departed on 30 November, bound for Aitape, British New Guinea. Arriving there on 1 December, Wayne remained at anchor through Christmas.

=== Invasion of Luzon ===
Loading cargo on the 17th, the attack transport had fueled on Christmas Eve and, on the 26th, took the main body of troops – from the 3d Battalion, 172d Infantry, 43rd Division, United States Army – on board. After landing exercises at Aitape on the 27th, Wayne departed British New Guinea the following day, as part of the San Fabian Attack Group, bound for Lingayen Gulf.

As the ship's commanding officer later recalled, "the most memorable feature of the assault on Luzon, from the standpoint of the transports involved, was the long and difficult journey which the ships were forced to make through enemy waters between Leyte and Luzon." The convoy passed through the Surigao Strait into the Mindanao Sea on 5 January 1945 and entered the Sulu Sea west of the islands of Panay and Mindoro on the 6th.

On 9 January, Army forces landed at Lingayen Gulf under cover of gunfire from ships offshore and carrier based aircraft overhead. Wayne disembarked her troops in her fifth assault landing and remained in the transport area offshore until the evening of 10 January. Air activity was heavier than the ship had encountered in any previous operation. The Japanese often attacked at dawn and at dusk, frequently utilizing single planes.

==== Friendly fire incident ====
Wayne had opened fire on a low flying twin-engined "Dinah" but scored no hits. Later that day, at 18:35, a twin-engined "Frances" flew over the transport area dropping a stick of bombs that fell near Wayne. The danger of heavy antiaircraft fire laid down in the vicinity of "friendly" ships was amply demonstrated when two men in Wayne's crew were wounded by fragments from "friendly" gunfire.

Wayne departed the transport area on the 10th and, upon receipt of an enemy plane alert at 1905, went to general quarters. At 19:14, a single enemy aircraft under fire from the ships in column on both flanks of Wayne, crashed into the port side of attack transport USS DuPage (APA-41), the column leader directly ahead of Wayne. An explosion followed, and DuPage was rapidly shrouded in smoke. Wayne sheared out of the column to port; but DuPage held her course and speed in column, prompting Wayne to move back into formation astern. The following morning, she transferred two medical officers and eight corpsmen to DuPage to treat casualties caused by the suicide plane.

On the afternoon of 15 January, Wayne reached Leyte Island, and anchored off Taytay Point, receiving on board an advance detail of the 1st Battalion, 128th Infantry, 32nd Division – the same battalion that she had brought to Leyte almost three months before. Almost nightly air raid alerts enlivened the ship's ensuing stay at Tacloban, Leyte, and the ship's company became accustomed to almost nightly "red alerts."

On 24 January, Wayne departed Leyte; en route back to Luzon, her convoy came under attack by Japanese torpedo planes. One succeeded in hitting the dock landing ship USS Shadwell (LSD-15), just astern of Wayne in the steaming disposition. Shadwell, able to proceed on one engine, consequently veered out of formation and returned to Leyte. Wayne, meanwhile, continued onward with the rest of the convoy and reached Lingayen Gulf with her embarked reinforcements on the 27th.

Between 08:30 and 13:31, Wayne unloaded her troops and cargo and got underway to return to Leyte at 18:17 that evening. By 21:00 on the 30th, the attack transport was back off Taytay Point. There was little rest for the ship, however, for she soon received orders directing her to Guadalcanal, as part of Transport Squadron 12 (TransRon 12). Departing Leyte on 2 February, Wayne arrived at Tulagi harbor on the 11th. Assigned to carry the 2d Battalion, 22d Marines, of the 6th Marine Division, Wayne spent a bit over a month fueling, provisioning, loading cargo, and carrying out the inevitable training exercises.

=== Invasion of Okinawa ===
Early on the morning of 15 March, TransRon 12 got underway, bound, via the Carolines, for the Ryūkyūs. A week later, Wayne arrived at Ulithi, the staging point for the invasion of Okinawa. There, a number of the marines and sailors embarked at Tulagi were transferred to tank landing ships (LSTs). On the afternoon of 27 March, Wayne and the other ships of the invasion force set sail for Okinawa itself. "All hands anticipated that the attack on Okinawa would be a difficult and dangerous undertaking", wrote Wayne's chronicler.

Her troops went ashore on D-Day – Easter Morning, 1 April 1945 – on a small beach dominated by high ground and protected by a reef. The actual landing, gratifyingly, seemed "puzzlingly easy" to observers in Wayne. Her embarked troops went ashore against slight resistance. During the day, unloading progressed until 17:45, when Wayne and her consorts headed seaward in night retirement disposition. Red alerts, however, continued throughout the night—alerts that had resulted in the ship's being called repeatedly to general quarters.

At 05:43 on the 2nd, Wayne returned to the transport area and observed heavy antiaircraft fire from other ships in the vicinity, as well as enemy planes attacking ships close to the beaches. By evening, Wayne had made satisfactory progress in the unloading and then was ordered to move closer inshore. She anchored for the night close to the beach and completed unloading the remainder of her cargo before standing out to sea at 00:15 on the morning of 3 April. However, instead of being ordered from the area, Wayne was directed instead to put into Kerama Retto, by way of "Point Oboe." She consequently loaded empty brass shell casings from heavy cruiser USS Salt Lake City (CA-25) before she moved into Kerama Retto to take on more brass and to receive on board casualties from other ships that had been sunk or damaged during the nearly incessant Japanese air raids.

Wayne remained at Kerama Retto from 5 to 9 April, spending much of that time moored alongside the battle-battered attack transport USS Hinsdale (APA-120) that had been damaged by a suicide plane on 31 March. Wayne fed the crew of that ship and provided her with power. Red alerts and air raids continued almost without letup; "more than once enemy planes were observed making suicide attacks on other ships in the vicinity."

Loaded with empty brass, survivors, and casualties, Wayne weighed anchor on 9 April and headed for the Marianas. She anchored in Saipan harbor on the 13th before she shifted to the Marshalls, arriving at Eniwetok on the 18th. From there, the attack transport steamed on to Hawaii, arriving at Pier 8, Honolulu, on the morning of 27 April. Proceeding independently from Hawaii to the west coast of the United States, Wayne departed Pearl Harbor on 29 April and reached San Francisco on 6 May. After disembarking casualties and survivors from the Okinawa crucible there, she sailed north to Astoria, Oregon, on 12 May for an overhaul. Completing repairs late in July, Wayne departed Astoria on the 27th, bound for San Diego, and arrived there soon thereafter. On 10 August, Wayne sailed for the Marianas with naval and marine passengers – replacements bound for the forward areas of the Pacific theater.

=== After hostilities ===
The end of the war in mid-August found Wayne at sea, steaming to the western Pacific. She made a fuel stop at Eniwetok on 26 August and reached Guam shortly thereafter where she unloaded her cargo and disembarked her passengers. Wayne embarked men of the 3d Battalion, 6th Marines, at Saipan and, on 18 September, got underway for Japan. She disembarked the marines at Nagasaki on 23 September and then proceeded to the Philippines, touching at Manila first and later at Mindoro. The attack transport departed the Philippines in late October, stopped at Guam for fuel on the 21st and arrived at San Diego on 6 November.

Between 21 November 1945 and 7 January 1946, Wayne made one similar trip to the Philippines, returning Navy veterans to the United States in Operation Magic Carpet. Subsequently, visiting Seattle and San Diego, she cleared the latter port on 26 January 1946 and transited the Panama Canal on 6 February.

=== Decommission ===
Making port at New Orleans on the 11th, Wayne later shifted to Mobile and thence moved to her building site at the Gulf Shipbuilding Corporation where she was decommissioned on 16 March 1946. Her name was struck from the Navy List on 17 April 1946, and, on 1 August of the same year, she was transferred to the War Shipping Administration.

=== Decorations ===
Wayne (APA-54) received seven battle stars for her World War II service.

== Commercial service ==
The ship was purchased by the Waterman Steamship Corporation, of Mobile, Alabama, on 24 February 1947 and renamed Beauregard. The ship was then transferred to Waterman Airlines, Inc. 5 May 1949 and then to Pan Atlantic Steamship Corporation in May 1954. Beauregard was sold back to Waterman Steamship Corporation in April 1956 and then, in March 1958, sold to the Wilmington, Delaware-based Beauregard, Inc. and converted to a van ship. On 16 November 1964 Beauregard was sold to Litton Industries Leasing Corporation and again, on 28 February 1975, to the Reynolds Leasing Corporation. Beauregard was scrapped after sale to Lien Hung Steel Enterprise Co. at Kaohsiung, Taiwan on 4 May 1977.
