= Sumter-class attack transport =

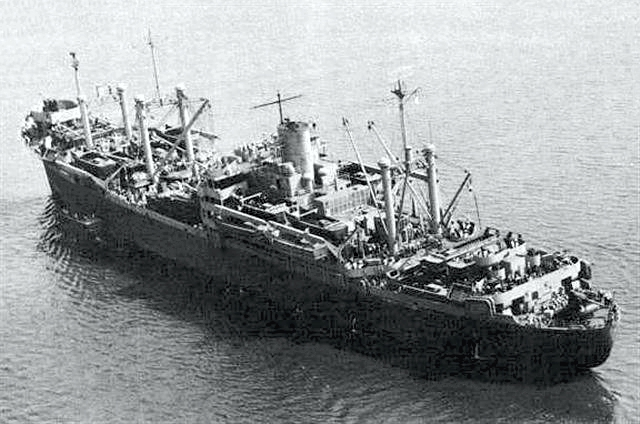
- USS Warren (APA-53), a ship of the Sumter class, at Hampton Roads, 23 August 1943

Class overview
- Name: Sumter-
- Builders: Gulf Shipbuilding
- Operators: US Navy
- Preceded by: Bayfield class
- Succeeded by: Gilliam class
- In commission: 27 Aug 1943 – 15 May 1944 - 16 Mar 1946 - 17 Apr 1946
- Completed: 4

General characteristics
- Type: Attack transport
- Displacement: 8,591 tons (lt) 13,910 tons (fl)
- Length: 468 ft 8 in (142.85 m)
- Beam: 63 ft (19 m)
- Draft: 23 ft 3 in (7.09 m) (limiting)
- Propulsion: 1 × General Electric geared-drive turbine, 2 × Babcock & Wilcox header-type boilers, 1 propeller, designed shaft horsepower 6,000
- Speed: 16.5 knots
- Capacity: Troops: 91-95 Officers, 1,340-1,472 Enlisted; Cargo: 170,000 cu ft, 1,300-1,450 tons
- Complement: 38-57 Officers, 410-619 Enlisted
- Armament: 2 × 5"/38 caliber dual-purpose gun mount; 4 × twin 40 mm gun mounts; 10 × single 20 mm gun mounts

The Sumter-class attack transport was a class of attack transport built for service with the US Navy in World War II.

Like all attack transports, the purpose of the Sumter's was to transport troops and their equipment to foreign shores in order to execute amphibious invasions using an array of smaller assault boats integral to the attack transport itself. Like all the attack transports, the Sumter-class was heavily armed with antiaircraft weaponry to protect itself and its cargo of troops from air attack in the battle zone.

== History ==
The Sumter class ships were based upon the US Maritime Commission's Type C2 merchant ship hull - specifically, the C2-S-E1 type. The class consisted of only four ships - three of them laid down in April 1942, not long after the US entry into the war, and the remaining ship laid down almost a year later, in March 1943. All four ships were built by the Gulf Shipbuilding Corporation, at Chickasaw, Alabama.

The first three ships in the class were originally intended to be plain transports, but on 1 February 1943 they, along with numerous other transports then in service or still on the slipways, were redesignated as attack transports. This entailed fitting extra antiaircraft weaponry, providing the ships with an array of amphibious assault craft and the means to deploy them, and other modifications. The extra work required to upgrade the ships in the class from transports to attack transports was done at either Bethlehem Steel, Maryland Drydock or the Atlantic Basin Iron Works, and delayed their commission by five or six months so that they did not become available for service until August/September 1943. The fourth ship in the class, the USS Baxter (APA-94), was designated an attack transport from the outset but still had to go through the same refitting process after being built, which also delayed its commission by about the same length of time.

While the four ships of the class were based on the same hull design, they are listed as having somewhat variable troop and cargo capacities and crews. They could carry between 1,433 and 1,563 troops and had crews of between about 450 and 650. The first three ships had a cargo capacity limit of 1,300 tons, but the last, Baxter had a limit of 1,450 tons.

=== In service ===
The four ships of the class served exclusively in the Pacific Theatre. The first three arrived in time to participate in much of the American island hopping campaign across the Pacific to its final destination of Japan. Consequently, they had no shortage of action - USS Wayne (APA-54) in particular earning seven battle stars. The fourth ship, Baxter, was commissioned about twelve months later but still had time to participate in three campaigns and earn three stars.

All four ships were struck from the Naval Register shortly after the war in March/April 1946, and all four went on to have successful careers as commercial cargo vessels. Baxter, renamed La Salle was the first to be scrapped, in 1968. The other three were eventually converted into container ships which prolonged their service by another decade or so, finally being scrapped in 1977–78. The ships thus enjoyed an overall service life of between about 33 to 44 years.
