= List of United States Navy ships: P =

Ships of the United States Navy

Ships in current service
- Current ships

Ships grouped alphabetically
- A–B; C; D–F; G–H; I–K; L; M; N–O; P; Q–R; S; T–V; W–Z

Ships grouped by type
- Aircraft carriers; Airships; Amphibious warfare ships; Auxiliaries; Battlecruisers; Battleships; Cruisers; Destroyers; Destroyer escorts; Destroyer leaders; Escort carriers; Frigates; Hospital ships; Littoral combat ships; Mine warfare vessels; Monitors; Oilers; Patrol vessels; Registered civilian vessels; Sailing frigates; Steam frigates; Steam gunboats; Ships of the line; Sloops of war; Submarines; Torpedo boats; Torpedo retrievers; Unclassified miscellaneous; Yard and district craft

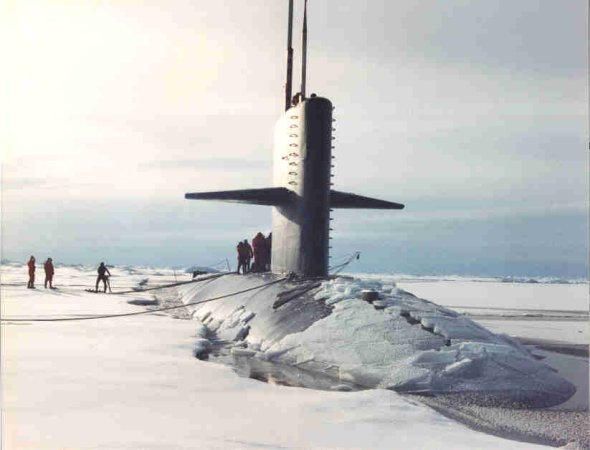
USS Pargo (SSN-650)

|Ship caption=USS Pargo (SSN-650)

This section of the list of United States Navy ships contains all ships of the United States Navy with names beginning with P.

For a list exclusively of currently commissioned ships, see the List of current ships of the United States Navy.

For ships with unique names, "USS Ship‍name" redirects to the ship article. For reused names, "USS Ship‍name" is an index page for the ships of that name; the links after the name lead to the specific ship pages.

== P ==
- USS P. H. Burnett (IX-104)
- USS P. K. Bauman (SP-377)

== Pac–Par ==
- RV Pacific Escort (T-AGOR-26)
- USS Paddle (SS-263)
- USS Paducah (AG-7/IX-23/PG-18, YTB-758)
- USS Page County (LST-1076)
- USS Paiute (AT-159/ATF-159)
- USS Pakana (AT-108/ATF-108)
- USS Palace (PYc-33/YAG-13)
- USS Palatka (YTB-801)
- USS Palau (CVE-122/AKV-22)
- USS Palawan (ARG-10)
- USS Palisade (AM-270)
- USS Palisana (AF-39)
- USS Pallas (1778)
- USS Palm (YN-23/AN-28)
- USS Palm Beach (AKL-45/AGER-3)
- USS Palmer (DD-161/DMS-5)
- USCGC Palmetto (WAGL-265)
- USS Palmyra (ARST-3)
- USS Palo Blanco (YN-85/AN-64)
- USS Palo Verde (YN-86/AN-65)
- USS Paloma (SP-533)
- USS Palomas (IX-91)
- USS Palos (1865, PG-16/PR-1)
- USS Paloverde (ATA-215)
- USS Pamanset (AO-85/T-AO-85)
- USS Pamina (AKA-34, AKL-41)
- USS Pampanga (PG-39)
- USS Pampanito (SS-383/AGSS-383)
- USS Pampero (1853)
- USS Panama (SP-101)
- USS Panaman (ID-3299)
- USS Panameta (YT-402/YTB-402/YTM-402)
- USS Panamint (AGC-13)
- USS Panay (1899, PG-45/PR-5, AG-41)
- USS Panda (IX-125)
- USS Pandemus (ARL-18)
- USCGC Pandora (WPC-113)
- USS Pansy (1861, 1878)
- USS Panther (AD-6, IX-105, ex USS SC-1470)
- USS Panuco (ID-1533)
- USNS Paoli (T-AO-157)
- USS Papago (AT-160/ATF-160)
- USS Papaya (YN-68/AN-49)
- USS Para (1861)
- USS Paragon (PYc-36)
- USS Paragould (PC-465)
- USS Paragua (1888)
- USS Paramount (AMc-92)
- USS Parche (SS-384/AGSS-384, SSN-683)
- USS Pargo (SS-264, SSN-650)
- USS Paricutin (AE-18)
- USS Park County (LST-1077)
- USS Parker (DD-48, DD-604)
- USNS Parkersburg (T-AO-163)
- USS Parks (DE-165)
- USS Parle (DE-708)
- USS Parrakeet (AMc-34, AMS-30, AM-419)
- USS Parret (PG-109)
- USS Parris Island (AG-72)
- USS Parrot (AMS-197/MSC-197)
- USS Parrott (DD-218)
- USS Parsons (DD-949/DDG-33)
- USS Parthenia (SP-671)
- USS Partridge (AM-16/AT-138/ATO-138, AM-407, AMS-31, AMCU-36)

== Pas–Pay ==
- USS Pasadena (CL-65, SSN-752)
- USS Pascagoula (1918, PCE-874)
- USS Pasco (PG-114/PF-6)
- USS Pasig (AO-89, AO-91/AW-3)
- USS Pasley (PG-194/PF-86, DE-519)
- USS Pasquotank (YOG-48/AOG-18)
- USS Passaconaway (1863, YN-111/AN-86)
- USS Passaic (1862, YN-113/AN-87, YT-20)
- USS Passumpsic (AO-107/T-AO-107)
- USS Pastores (ID-4540/AF-16)
- USS Pat Caharty (1919)
- USS Patapsco (1799, 1806, 1812, 1862, AT-10, AOG-1)
- USS Patchogue (ID-1227/YFB-1227, PC-586)
- USS Pathfinder (AGS-1/OSS-30, T-AGS-60)
- USS Patoka (AO-9/AV-6/AG-125)
- USS Patricia (1899)
- USS Patrick Gallagher (DDG-127)
- USS Patrick Henry (SSBN-599/SSN-599)
- USS Patriot (1861, 1926/YT-127, PYc-47, MCM-7)
- USS Patroclus (ARL-19)
- USS Patrol (1917)
- USS Patrol #1 (SP-45)
- USS Patrol #2 (SP-409)
- USS Patrol #4 (SP-8)
- USS Patrol #5 (SP-29)
- USS Patrol #6 (SP-54)
- USS Patrol #7 (SP-31)
- USS Patrol #8 (SP-56)
- USS Patrol #10 (SP-85)
- USS Patrol #11 (SP-1106)
- USS Patroon (1859)
- USS Patterson (DD-36, DD-392, DE-1061/FF-1061)
- USS Pattina (SP-675)
- USS Patton (PG-195/PF-87)
- USS Patuxent (AT-11, AO-44, T-AO-201)
- USS Paul (DE-1080/FF-1080)
- USNS Paul Buck (T-AOT-1122)
- USS Paul F. Foster (DD-964)
- USS Paul G. Baker (DE-642, DE-755)
- USS Paul Hamilton (DD-307, DD-590, DDG-60)
- USS Paul Ignatius (DDG-117)
- USS Paul Jones (1862, DD-10, DD-230/AG-120)
- USS Paul Jones Jr. (1863)
- USS Paul Revere (APA-248/LPA-248)
- USS Paulding (DD-22)
- USS Pauline (SP-658)
- USS Pavlic (DE-669/APD-70)
- USS Pavo (AK-139)
- USS Paw Paw (1863)
- USS Pawcatuck (AO-108/T-AO-108)
- USS Pawnee (1859, YT-21, SP-699, AT-74/ATF-74)
- USS Pawtucket (YT-7/YTM-7, YT-359/YTB-359/YTM-359)
- USS Pawtuxet (1864)
- USS Payette County (LST-1079)
- USS Paysandu (ID-3880)

== Pc–Pe ==
- USS PC-815 (PC-815)
- USS PC-1217 (PC-1217)
- USS PC-1264 (PC-1264)
- USS Peacock (1813, AM-46, AMS-198/MSC-198)
- USS Pearl (SP-1219, PG-196/PF-88)
- USS Pearl Harbor (LSD-52)
- USS Pearl River (LSM(R)-516)
- USS Peary (DD-226)
- USS Pecatonica (AOG-57)
- USS Peconic (AOG-68/T-AOG-68)
- USS Pecos (AO-6, AO-65/T-AO-65, T-AO-197)
- USS Pee Dee River (LSM(R)-517)
- USS Peerless (SP-1639, AMc-93)
- USS Pegasus (AK-48/IX-222, PHM-1)
- USS Peggy (SP-1072)
- USS Peiffer (DE-588)
- USS Peleliu (LHA-5)
- USS Pelias (AS-14)
- USS Pelican (AM-27/AVP-6, AMS-32/MSC(O)-32, MHC-53)
- USS Pembina (1861, AK-200/T-AK-200)
- USS Pemiscot (AK-201)
- USS Penacook (1898, YT-6/YTM-6, YT–279/YTB-279)
- USS Pender County (LST-1080)
- USS Penetrate (AM-271/MSF-271)
- USS Penguin (1861, AM–33, ASR-12)
- USS Pennewill (DE-175)
- USS Pennsylvania (1837, ACR-4, BB-38, SSBN-735)
- USS Pennsylvania R. R. No. 9 (SP-679)
- USS Pennsylvanian (ID-3511)
- USS Penobscot (1861, SP-982/YT-42/YTB-42, ATA-188)
- USS Pensacola (1859, ID-2078/AK-7/AG-13, CL-24/CA-24, LSD-38)
- USS Pentheus (ARL-20)
- USS Pentucket (YT-8)
- USS Peony (1864)
- USS Peoria (1863, AT-48/YT-109, PG-175/PF-67, LST-1183)
- USS Peosta (1857)
- USS Pepperwood (YN-31/AN-36)
- USS Pequawket (YTB-705)
- USS Pequeni (1917)
- USS Pequot (1863, 1910, WARC-58)
- USS Perch (SS-176, SS-313/SSP-313/ASSP-313/APSS-313/LPSS-313/IXSS-313)
- USS Percival (DD-298, DD-452)
- USS Percy Drayton (1863)
- USS Perdido (ACV-47/CVE-47)
- USS Peregrine (AM-373/MSF-373/EMSF-373/AG-176)
- USS Perfecto (SP-86)
- USS Peri (1861)
- USS Peridot (PYc-18)
- USS Peril (AM-272/MSF-272)
- USS Periwinkle (1864)
- USS Perkins (DD-26, DD-377, DD-877/DDR-877)
- USS Permit (SS-178, SSN-594)
- USS Perry (1843, DD-11, DD-340/DMS-17, DD-844)
- USS Perseus (WPC-114, AF-64/T-AF-64)
- USS Perseverance (PYc-44)
- USS Persistent (PYc-48, AM-491/MSO-491, T-AGOS-6)
- USS Pert (1812, PG-95)
- USS Peshewah (YT-281/YTB-281)
- USS Pessacus (YT-192/YTB-192)
- USS Petalesharo (YTB-832)
- USS Petaluma (AOG-69, T-AOG-79)
- USS Pete (SP-596)
- USS Peter C. Struven (SP-332)
- USS Peter Demill (1861)
- USS Peter H. Crowell (ID-2987)
- USS Peterhoff (1863)
- SS Petersburg (T-AOT-9101)
- USS Peterson (DE-152, DD-969)
- USS Peto (SS-265)
- USS Petoskey (PC-569)
- USS Petrel (1846, 1862, PG-2, ASR-14)
- USS Petrelita (1899)
- USS Petrita (1846)
- USS Petrof Bay (CVE-80/CVU-80)
- USNS Petrolite (T-AO-164)
- USS Pettit (DE-253)
- USS Peyton (PG-199/PF-91)

== Pf–Pi ==
- USNS PFC Dewayne T. Williams (AK-3009/T-AK-3009)
- USS PFC Eugene A. Obregon (AK-3006)
- MV PFC James Anderson Jr. (AK-3002)
- MV PFC William B. Baugh (AK-3001)
- USS Phalarope (1881)
- USS Phantom (AM-273)
- USS Phaon (ARB-3)
- USS Pharris (DE-1094/FF-1094)
- USS Pheasant (AM-61/MSF-61)
- USS Phelps (DD-360)
- USS Phenakite (PYc-25)
- USS Philadelphia (1776, 1799, 1861, C-4/IX-24, CL-41, SSN-690, LPD-32)
- USS Philip (DD-76, DD-498/DDE-498)
- USS Philippi (1863)
- USS Philippine Sea (CV-47/CVA-47/CVS-47/AVT-11, CG-58)
- USS Philippines (SP-1677, CB-4)
- USS Phillimore (PG-197/PF-89)
- USS Phillips (SP-1389)
- USS Phineas Sprague (1861)
- USS Phlox (1864)
- USS Phobos (AK-129)
- USS Phoebe (AMc-57, AMS-199/MSC-199)
- USS Phoebus (YF-294/YDT-14)
- USS Phoenix (1778, 1841, 1861, CL-46, AG-172/T-AG-172, SSN-702)
- USS Piave (ID-3799)
- USS Pickaway (APA-222/LPA-222)
- USS Pickens (APA-190)
- USS Pickerel (SS-22, SS-177, SS-524)
- USS Pickering (1798)
- USS Picket (ACM-8, YAGR-7/AGR-7)
- USS Picking (DD-685)
- USS Pictor (AF-27/AF-54)
- USS Picuda (SS-382)
- USS Piedmont (AD-17)
- USS Pierce (AP-95/APA-50)
- USS Pierre (PC-1141, LCS-38)
- USS Pigeon (AM-47/ASR-6, AM-374/MSF-374, ASR-21)
- USS Pigot (1778)
- USS Pike (SS-6, SS-173)
- USS Pikeville (PC-776)
- USS Pilford (PG-193/PF-85)
- USS Pilgrim (1864, 1864a, SP-1204)
- USS Pilgrim II (YFB-30)
- USNS Pililaau (T-AKR-304)
- USS Pillsbury (DD-227, DE-133/DER-133)
- USS Pilot (1836, AM-104/MSF-104)
- USS Pilotfish (SS-386)
- USS Pima County (LST-1081)
- USS Pinafore (SP-450)
- USS Pinckney (DDG-91)
- USS Pinellas (AK-202)
- USCGC Pine (WAGL-162)
- USS Pine Island (AV-12)
- USS Pink (1863)
- USS Pinkney (APH-2)
- USS Pinna (SS-178)
- USS Pinnacle (AM-274, AM-462/MSO-462)
- USS Pinnebog (AOG-58/T-AOG-58)
- USS Pinola (1861, AT-33/ATO-33, ATA-206)
- USS Pinon (YN-87/AN-66)
- USS Pinta (1864)
- USS Pintado (SS-387/AGSS-387, SSN-672)
- USS Pintail (AMc-17)
- USS Pinto (AT-90/ATF-90)
- USS Piomingo (YT-282/YTB-282)
- USS Pioneer (1836, 1918, 1929, AM-105/MSF-105, OSS-31, MCM-9)
- SS Pioneer Commander (AK-2016)
- SS Pioneer Contractor (AK-2018)
- SS Pioneer Crusader (AK-2019)
- USS Pioneer Valley (AO-140/T-AO-140)
- USS Pipefish (SS-388/AGSS-388)
- USS Pipestone (AK-203)
- USS Piper (SS-409/AGSS-409)
- USS Pipit (AMc-1, AM-420)
- USS Piqua (SP-130, YTB-793)
- USS Piranha (SS-389/AGSS-389)
- USS Pirate (SP-229, AM-275)
- USS Piscataqua (1866, 1869, AT-49, AOG-70, T-AOG-80)
- USS Pit River (LSM(R)-518)
- USS Pitamakan (YT-403/YTB-403/YTM-403)
- USS Pitchlynn (YT-283/YTB-283)
- USS Pitkin (AK-204)
- USS Pitkin County (LST-1082)
- USS Pitt (APA-223/APA-223)
- USS Pittsburgh (ACR-4/CA-4, CA-70, CA-72, SSN-720, LPD-31)
- USS Pivot (AM-276, AM-463/MSO-463)

== Pl–Pol ==
- USS Placerville (PC-1087)
- USS Plaice (SS-390)
- USS Plainview (AGEH-1)
- USS Planter (1860, ACM-2)
- USS Platono (AF-27)
- USS Platte (AO-24, AO-186)
- USS Plattsburg (ID-1645)
- USS Pledge (AM-277, AM-492/MSO-492)
- USS Pleiades (SP-1616, AK-46)
- USS Plover (AM-12, AM-408, AMc-3, AMS-33/MSC(O)-33)
- USS Pluck (AMc-94, AM-464/MSO-464)
- USS Plumas County (LST-1083)
- USS Plunger (SS-2, SS-179, SSN-595)
- USS Plunkett (DD-431)
- USS Plymouth (1844, 1867, SP-3308, PG-57)
- USS Plymouth Rock (LSD-29)
- USS Pocahontas (1852, AT-18, ID-3044, YT-266/YTB-266/YTM-266)
- USS Pocasset (YTB-516/YTM-779)
- USS Pocatello (PG-117/PF-9)
- USS Pochard (AM-375/MSF-375)
- USS Pocomoke (SP-571, SP-265/YT-43, AV-9)
- USS Pocono (AGC-16/LCC-16)
- USS Pocotagligo (IX-86)
- USS Pogatacut (YTB-267)
- USS Pogy (SS-266, SSN-647)
- USS Poinsett (1840, AK-205)
- USNS Point Barrow (T-AKD-1)
- USS Point Bonita (ID-3496)
- USS Point Cruz (CVE-119/AKV-19/T-AKV-19)
- USS Point Defiance (LSD-24, LSD-31)
- USS Point Lobos (ID-3404)
- USNS Point Loma (T-AGDS-2, T-EPF-15)
- USS Pokagon (YTB-274, YTB-746/YTM-746, YTB-836)
- USS Pokanoket (YTB-517/YTM-762)
- USS Polana (AKA-35)
- USS Polar Bear (ID-3666)
- USS Polar Land (SP-3651)
- USS Polar Sea (SP-3301)
- USS Polar Star (SP-3787)
- USS Polaris (1871, AF-11)
- USS Politesse (SP-662)
- USRC Polk (1846)
- USS Polk County (LST-1084)
- USS Pollack (SS-180, SSN-603)
- USS Pollux (SP-2573, AKS-2, AKS-4, T-AK-290/T-AKR-290)
- USS Polly (SP-690)
- USS Pollyanna (SP-1048)

== Pom–Pow ==
- USS Pomander (SP-702)
- USNS Pomeroy (T-AKR-316)
- USS Pomfret (SS-391)
- USS Pomodon (SS-486)
- USS Pompano (1906, SS-181, SS-491)
- USS Pompanoosuc (1863)
- USS Pompey (AF-5)
- USS Pompon (SS-267/SSR-267)
- USS Ponaganset (AO-86)
- USS Ponce (SP-364, LPD-15/AFSB-15)
- USS Ponchatoula (AOG-38, AO-148/T-AO-148)
- USS Pondera (APA-191)
- USS Ponkabia (YTB-411)
- USS Pontiac (1864, YT-20, SP-2343, AF-20, YTB-756)
- USS Pontoosuc (1864)
- USS Pontotoc (AK-206/AG-94/AVS-7)
- USS Pontus (AGP-20)
- USS Poole (DE-151)
- USS Pope (DD-225, DE-134)
- USS Popham (PG-198/PF-90)
- USS Poplar (YN-24, WAGL-241)
- USS Poppy (1863)
- USS Poquim (YTB-285)
- USS Porcupine (1813, IX-126)
- USS Porpoise (1820, 1836, SS-7, YFB-2047, SS-172)
- USS Port Blakeley (YT-266)
- USS Port Clinton (PC-1242)
- USS Port Discovery (YTB-267)
- USS Port Fire (1864)
- USS Port Royal (1862, CG-69, CG-73)
- USS Port Whangarei (YAG-25)
- USS Portage (PCE-902)
- USS Portage Bay (CVE-115)
- USS Portent (AM-106)
- USS Porter (TB-6, DD-59, DD-356, DD-800, DDG-78)
- USS Porterfield (DD-682)
- USS Portland (CA-33, LSD-37, LPD-27)
- USS Portobago (YTB-413)
- USS Portsmouth (1798, 1843, CL-102, SSN-707, T-EMS-3)
- USS Portunus (AGP-4, ARC-1)
- USS Poseidon (ARL-12) (ARL-12)
- USS Positive (AMc-95)
- USS Postmaster General (SP-2364)
- USS Potawatomi (AT-109/ATF-109)
- USS Potomac (1822, 1861, AT-50, AG-25, T-AO-150, T-AO-181/T-AOT-181, SSN-814)
- USS Potomska (1861)
- USS Potter County (LST-1086)
- USS Poughkeepsie (PG-134/PF-26, YTB-813)
- USS Powder River (LSM(R)-519)
- USS Power (AMc-96, DD-839)
- USS Powhatan (1850, 1861, 1898, ID-3013, YT-128/YTM-128, T-ATF-166)

== Pra–Pri ==
- USS Prairie (AD-5, AD-15)
- USS Prairie Bird (1862)
- USS Prairie State (IX-15)
- USS Pratt (DE-363)
- USS Preble (1813, 1839, DD-12, DD-345/DM-20/AG-99, DLG-15/DDG-46, DDG-88)
- USS Precept (YN-79/AN-73)
- USS Precise (AN-74)
- USS Prefect (YN-88/AN-75)
- USS Prentiss (AKA-102)
- USS Prescott (PCS-1423)
- USS Preserver (ARS-8)
- USS President (1800, 1812)
- USS President Adams (AP-38/APA-19)
- USS President Grant (ID-3014)
- USS President Hayes (AP-39/APA-20)
- USS President Jackson (AP-37/APA-18/T-APA-18)
- USS President Lincoln (1907)
- USS President Monroe (AP-104)
- USS President Polk (AP-103)
- USS President Warfield (IX-169)
- USS Presidio (APA-88)
- USS Presley (DE-371)
- USS Presque Isle (APB-44, AKS-19)
- USS Prestige (AMc-97, AM-465/MSO-465)
- USS Preston (1864, 1865, DD-19, DD-327, DD-379, DD-795)
- USS Pretext (AN-76)
- USS Pretoria (1897)
- USS Prevail (AM-107/AGS-20, T-AGOS-8/IX-537/TSV-1)
- USS Preventer (AN-77)
- USS Price (DE-332/DER-332)
- USS Prichett (DD-561)
- USS Pride (DE-323, AK-5017)
- USS Prime (AM-279, AM-466/MSO-466)
- USS Primrose (1863)
- USS Prince (ACV-45/CVE-45)
- USS Prince Georges (AP-165/AK-224)
- USS Prince William (AVG-19/ACV-19/CVE-19, AVG-31/ACV-31/CVE-31/CVHE-31)
- USS Princess Matoika (ID-2290)
- USS Princess Royal (1863)
- USS Princeton (1843, 1851, 1897, PG-13, CV-23/CVL-23, CV-37/CVA-37/CVS-37/LPH-5, CG-59)
- USS Principle (AMc-97)
- USS Pringle (DD-477)
- USS Prinz Eitel Friedrich (ID-1628)
- USS Prinz Eugen (IX-300)
- USS Prinz Friedrich Wilhelm (ID-4063)
- USS Prinzess Irene (ID-3044)
- USS Priscilla (SP-44)
- USNS Private Elden H. Johnson (T-AP-184)
- USNS Private Francis X. McGraw (T-AK-241)
- USNS Private Frank J. Petrarca (T-AK-250)
- MV Private Franklin J. Phillips (AK-3004)
- USNS Private Joe E. Mann (T-AK-253)
- USNS Private Joe P. Martinez (T-AP-187)
- USNS Private John F. Thorson (T-AK-247)
- USNS Private John R. Towle (T-AK-240)
- USNS Private Jose F. Valdez (T-APC-119/T-AG-169)
- USNS Private Joseph F. Merrell (T-AKV-4/T-AK-275)
- USNS Private Leonard C. Brostrom (T-AK-255)
- USNS Private Sadao S. Munemori (T-AP-190)
- USNS Private William H. Thomas (T-AP-185)
- USS Privateer (SP-179/YP-179)

== Pro–Py ==
- USS Procyon (AG-11, AK-19/AKA-2, AF-61)
- USS Progress (AMc-98)
- USS Progressive (SP-2003)
- USS Project (AM-278)
- USS Prometheus (1814, AR-3)
- USS Propus (AK-132)
- USS Proserpine (ARL-21)
- USS Protector (1863, ARS-14, YAGR-11/AGR-11)
- USS Proteus (1863, AC-9, AS-19/IX-518)
- USS Proton (AG-147/AKS-28)
- USS Providence (1775, 1776 frigate, 1776 gundalow, CL-82/CLG-6/CG-6, SSN-709, SSN-719)
- USS Provincetown (PCS-1378)
- USS Provo (T-AG-173)
- USS Provo Victory (AK-228)
- USS Prowess (AM-280/MSF-280/IX-305)
- USS Prowse (PG-200/PF-92)
- USS Prudent (PG-96)
- USS Pruitt (DD-347/DM-22/AG-101)
- USS Psyche V (SP-9)
- PT boats
- USS Ptarmigan (AM-376/MSF-376)
- USS Pudiano (SS-392)
- USS Pueblo (ACR-7/CA-7, PG-121/PF-13, AKL-44/AGER-2)
- USS Puerto Rico (CB-5, HST-2, T-EPF-11)
- USS Puffer (SS-268, SSN-652)
- USS Puffin (AMc-29)
- USS Puget Sound (AV-13, CVE-113/CVHE-113/AKV-13, AD-38)
- USS Pulaski (1854)
- USS Pulaski County (LST-1088)
- USS Pumper (YO-56)
- USS Purdy (DD-734)
- USS Puritan (1864, BM-1, ID-2222, IX-69, ACM-16/MMA-16)
- USS Pursuit (1861, AM-108/AGS-17)
- USS Purveyor (1859)
- USS Pushmataha (1868, YTB-830)
- USS Putnam (DD-287, DD-757)
- USS Puyallup (YT-806)
- USS Pybus (AVG-34/ACV-34/CVE-34)
- USS Pyro (AE-1, AE-24)
- USS Pyrope (PYc-17)
