= Paul Buck =

Paul Buck may refer to:

- Paul Herman Buck (1899–1978), American historian
- USNS Paul Buck, a transport oiler ship
