= USS Pearl =

USS Pearl has been the name of more than one United States Navy ship, and may refer to:

- USS Pearl (PF-88), a patrol frigate transferred to the United Kingdom while under construction which served in the Royal Navy as HMS Seychelles (K592) from 1944 to 1946
- USS Pearl (SP-1219), a patrol vessel in commission from 1917 to 1918
