= RV Pacific Escort =

RV Pacific Escort is a name used more than once by the U.S. Navy:

- RV Pacific Escort I (T-AGOR-26), an Army tugboat acquired by the U.S. Navy in 1985 as an escort for submarines and as a for-hire oceanographic research ship at the Mare Island Naval Shipyard.
- RV Pacific Escort II (IX-517), a Robert D. Conrad-class oceanographic research ship acquired by the U.S. Navy in 1965.
