= USS Patchogue =

Ship name

USS Patchogue has been the name of more than one United States Navy ship, and may refer to:

- USS Patchogue (YFB-1227), a ferryboat in service from 1917 to 1922
- USS PC-586, a submarine chaser in commission from 1942 to 1950, renamed USS Patchogue (PC-586) in 1955 while out of commission
