= USS Parrakeet =

USS Parrakeet may refer to one of the following United States Navy ships:

- USS Parrakeet (AMc-34), coastal minesweeper, placed in service 29 April 1941.
- USS Parrakeet (AMS-30), the former YMS-434 commissioned 15 November 1944.
- USS Parrakeet (AM–419), an Admirable-class minesweeper cancelled 11 August 1945.
