= USS Pirate =

USS Pirate has been the name of more than one United States Navy ship, and may refer to:

- USS Pirate (SP-229), a patrol vessel in commission from 1917 to 1918
- USS Pirate (AM-275), a minesweeper in commission from 1944 to 1946 and again in 1950

== See also ==
- Pirate (steamboat), an expeditionary supply vessel that sank in 1839.
