= USS Pinola =

USS Pinola may refer to the following ships of the United States Navy:

- USS Pinola (1861) a 691-ton Unadilla-class screw steam gunboat serving from 1862 to 1865
- USS Pinola (AT-33) a Bagaduce-class fleet tug built in 1919 and stricken 1946
- USS Pinola (ATA-206) a Sotoyomo-class auxiliary fleet tug built in 1944 and transferred to South Korea in 1962
