= USS Pontiac =

USS Pontiac may refer to the following ships of the United States Navy:

- USS Pontiac (1864), was a side-wheel gunboat launched in 1863 and sold in 1867
- USS Pontiac (YT-20), was laid down as Right Arm in 1891 and purchased by the US Navy in 1898; sold in 1922
- USS Pontiac (ID-2343), was originally Pioneer built in 1883, chartered by the US Navy in 1918 and returned to the owner the same year
- USS Pontiac (AF-20), was a refrigerator ship built in 1937, chartered by the US Navy in 1942 and returned to the Maritime Commission in 1945
- USS Pontiac (YTB-756), was a large harbor tugboat launched in 1960 and struck from the Naval Vessel Register in 1992
