= USS Proteus =

USS Proteus has been the name of several ships in the United States Navy.

- USS Proteus (1863), an American Civil War steamer that was purchased in 1864
- USS Proteus (AC-9), the lead ship of the Proteus-class colliers
- USS Proteus (AS-19), a Fulton-class submarine tender
