= USS Pawnee =

USS Pawnee may refer to the following ships operated by the United States Navy:

- USS Pawnee (1859), a screw sloop-of-war that served in the Union during the American Civil War
- USS Pawnee (YT-21), a harbor tug from 1898 to 1922
- USS Pawnee (SP-699), formerly named Monoloa II, a wooden hulled yacht used for minesweeping until 1921
- SS Pawnee (SP-1685), was designated by the Navy on 28 February 1917; under consideration for use as a cargo vessel on the coast of France; purchase of this ship was canceled in 1918
- USS Pawnee (ATF-74); an ocean tug that served through most of World War II
