= USS Ponce =

USS Ponce may refer to more than one United States Navy ship:

- USS Ponce (SP-364), was an 18-ton motorboat in the service of the United States Navy during World War I
- USS Ponce (LPD-15), was an amphibious transport commissioned in 1971 and decommissioned in 2017
