= USS Patriot =

At least three ships of the United States Navy have been named USS Patriot:

- USS Patriot (1861), a wooden schooner, purchased in 1861 by the Union Navy which planned to scuttle the ship at the mouth of the Hatteras Inlet in order to block the Confederate shipping channel; however the plan proved unnecessary after the Union victory at the Battle of Hatteras Inlet Batteries, and Patriot was used instead as a storeship at Hampton Roads.
- USS Patriot (YT-127), a tugboat acquired from the U.S. Coast Guard 24 August 1936.
- USS Patriot (PYc-47), built as a private yacht in 1930, purchased by the Navy in 1940, converted to a submarine chaser and put in service as PC-455 in 1941, renamed Patriot (PYc-47) in 1943, taken out of service and struck in 1944, and resold to the yacht's original owner in 1945 for one dollar.
- USS Patriot (MCM-7), an Avenger-class mine countermeasures ship that was launched in 1990, commissioned in 1991, and currently in service.
