= USS Perch =

Two ships of the United States Navy have borne the name USS Perch, named in honor of the perch, a type of fresh-water spiny-finned fish belonging to the family Percidae.

- The first USS Perch (SS-176) was a Porpoise-class submarine, commissioned in 1936 and stricken in 1942.
- The second USS Perch (SS-313) was a Balao-class submarine, commissioned in 1944 and stricken in 1971.
