= USS Pollack =

USS Pollack has been the name of more than one United States Navy ship, and may refer to:

- USS Pollack (SS-180), a submarine in commission from 1937 to 1945
- USS Pollack (SSN-603), a submarine in commission from 1964 to 1989
