= USS Planter =

USS Planter may refer to the following ships of the United States Navy:

- USS Planter (1860), a sidewheel steamer built at Charleston, South Carolina, in 1860
- USS Planter (ACM-2), acquired by the U.S. Navy 4 April 1944.
