= USS Pembina =

USS Pembina is a name used more than once by the United States Navy:

- USS Pembina (1861), a gunboat commissioned 16 October 1861
- USS Pembina (AK-200), a cargo ship commissioned 25 May 1945
