= USS Pasley =

USS Pasley has been the name of more than one United States Navy ship, and may refer to:

- USS Pasley (PF-86, ex-PG-194), a patrol frigate transferred to the United Kingdom prior to completion which served in the Royal Navy as the frigate HMS St. Helena (K590) from 1944 to 1945
- USS Pasley (DE-519), a destroyer escort in commission from August to October 1945 which previously served in the British Royal Navy as the frigate HMS Pasley (K564)
