= USS Psyche V =

United States patrol vessel

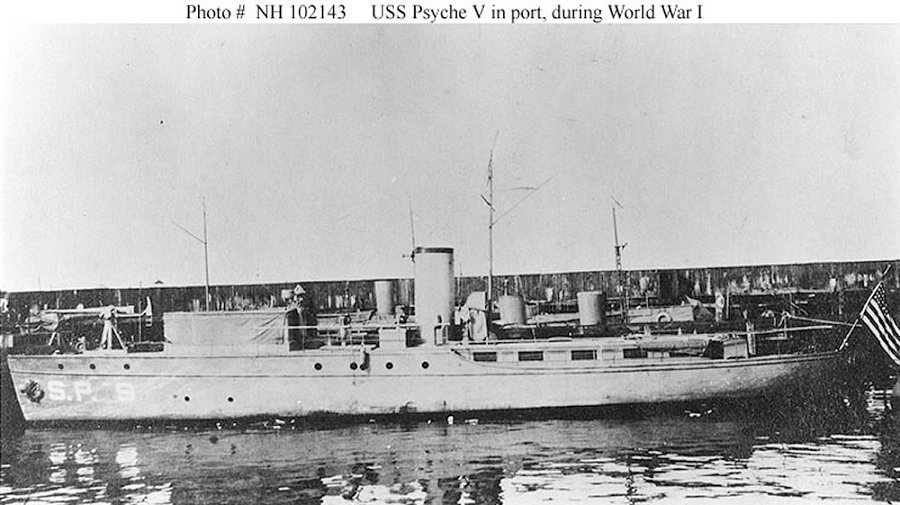
- USS Psyche V during World War I

History

United States
- Name: Psyche V
- Namesake: Previous name retained
- Builder: Fred S. Nock, East Greenwich, Rhode Island.
- Completed: 1911
- Acquired: 23 April 1917; delivered to Navy 2 May 1917
- Commissioned: 15 June 1917
- Fate: Transferred to U.S. Department of Commerce 16 June 1919
- Notes: Operated as private motorboat Achelous and Psyche V 1911-1917

General characteristics
- Type: Patrol vessel
- Tonnage: 43 tons
- Length: 75 ft (23 m)
- Beam: 13 ft 6 in (4.11 m)
- Draft: 4 ft 6 in (1.37 m)
- Speed: 12 kn (22 km/h; 14 mph)
- Complement: 11
- Armament: 1 × 3-pounder gun; 2 × machine guns

USS Psyche V (SP-9) was an armed motorboat that served in the United States Navy as a patrol vessel from 1917 to 1919.

Psyche V was built in 1911 by Fred S. Nock at East Greenwich, Rhode Island, as the private wooden motorboat Achelous. She had been renamed Psyche V by the time the U.S. Navy purchased her from her owner, W. S. Bentham of New York City, on 23 April 1917 for World War I service. She was delivered to the Navy on 2 May 1917 and commissioned as USS Psyche V (SP-9) at New York on 15 June 1917.

Psyche V was assigned to Squadron 8 in the 3rd Naval District for section patrol in the vicinity of New York City. She was transferred to Squadron 19 based at New York on 19 December 1918.

Psyche V was transferred to the United States Department of Commerce on 16 June 1919.
