= USS Paducah =

USS Paducah is a name used more than once by the U.S. Navy:

- USS Paducah (PG-18), a gunboat commissioned 2 September 1905.
- USS Paducah (YTB-758), a yard tug placed in service 24 February 1961.
