= USS Pivot =

USS Pivot is a name used more than once by the United States Navy:

- USS Pivot (AM-276), a fleet minesweeper commissioned 12 July 1944.
- USS Pivot (MSO-463), a fleet minesweeper commissioned 12 July 1954.
