= USS Pollyanna =

Patrol vessel of the United States Navy

History

United States
- Name: USS Pollyanna
- Namesake: Previous name retained
- Completed: 1900 or 1910
- Acquired: 31 July 1917
- Commissioned: 4 August 1917
- Fate: Returned to owner 22 January 1919
- Notes: Operated as private motorboat Pollyanna 1900 or 1910 to 1917 and from 1919

General characteristics
- Type: Patrol vessel
- Tonnage: 5 Gross register tons
- Length: 35 ft (11 m)
- Beam: 9 ft 4 in (2.84 m)
- Draft: 2 ft (0.61 m)
- Speed: 13 knots
- Complement: 4

USS Pollyanna (SP-1048) was a United States Navy patrol vessel in commission from 1917 to 1919.

Pollyanna was built as a private motorboat of the same name in 1900 or 1910. On 31 July 1917, the U.S. Navy chartered her from her owner, William H. Long of New York City, for use as a section patrol boat during World War I. She was commissioned at Newport, Rhode Island, on 4 August 1917 as USS Pollyanna (SP-1048).

Assigned to the 2nd Naval District in southern New England and based at Newport, Pollyanna carried out patrol duties for the rest of World War I.

The Navy returned Pollyanna to Long on 22 January 1919.
