= USS Power =

USS Power is a name used more than once by the United States Navy:

- USS Power (AMc-96), renamed USS Reaper (AMc-96)
- USS Power (DD-839), a World War II destroyer
