= USRC Polk =

Ship of the U.S. Revenue Cutter Service

History

United States
- Name: USRC Polk
- Namesake: James Knox Polk, 11th president of the United States
- Operator: United States United States Revenue–Marine
- Awarded: 4 December 1844
- Builder: J.R. Anderson, Richmond, Virginia
- Launched: December 1846
- Completed: December 1846
- Commissioned: 11 January 1847
- Decommissioned: 29 December 1854
- Fate: Sold 29 December 1854 for US$3,350

General characteristics
- Class & type: Schooner
- Tonnage: 400 tons
- Length: 160 ft (49 m)
- Beam: 24 ft (7.3 m)
- Draft: 9.3 ft (2.8 m)
- Installed power: 51 1/2" diameter X 50" stroke steam engine
- Propulsion: sail,
- Sail plan: converted to barque in 1848
- Armament: 5 × 32-pounders

The United States Revenue Cutter Polk was one of eight revenue cutters of the Legere–class iron steamers that were constructed and commissioned during the period of 1844 to 1846. Polk was a 400 ton vessel with side-wheels driven by a single steam engine. She was built at Richmond, Virginia, by J.R. Anderson and was an early example of the use of an iron hull in naval construction. The Legere–class of cutters were the first to use iron in the construction of the hull by the United States Revenue–Marine. Scheduled for delivery in early 1847, she was finished by Anderson by 3 December 1846 and was tasked by President Polk to serve with the United States Navy during the Mexican-American War.

Polk was commissioned by the Revenue–Marine on 7 January 1847 and four days later was turned over to the Navy. She arrived at Norfolk, Virginia, on 12 March with Lieutenant W.S. Ogden, USN in command. On 31 March Lieutenant Ogden reported to the Secretary of the Navy that Polk had leaked badly after she stood out to sea and he put into Ocracoke Inlet while temporary repairs were made. Her hull was found to be improperly fastened and she leaked copious amounts of water. On 4 April Polk got underway again and arrived at Norfolk on 5 April. A second attempt to leave for the Gulf of Mexico and the Mexican–American War was made by Ogden only to have more leakage of the hull. The Secretary of the Navy reported to the Secretary of the Treasury that the Navy had no further use of Polk on 22 April. Polk arrived at the Brooklyn Navy Yard where she received hull repairs on 15 May. From the fall of 1847 to the fall of 1848 Polk was detailed to an inventor named McCartney who was experimenting with a new type of naval gun. During the fall of 1848 Polk was transferred to Cold Spring, New York, where she was transformed into a barque sail configuration. After modification of her rigging she was ordered to San Francisco, California, leaving New York on 5 April 1850 and arriving at her destination on 27 September 1850.

Polk was sold at San Francisco on 29 December 1854 for US$3,350.
