= USS Pequeni =

American World War One patrol vessel

History

United States
- Name: Pequeni
- Namesake: Previous name retained
- Completed: 1917
- Acquired: 1917 or 1918
- Commissioned: 1917 or 1918
- Stricken: 31 December 1918
- Fate: Returned to owner, 31 December 1918
- Notes: Operated as civilian motorboat Pequeni before Navy service and from December 1918

General characteristics
- Type: Patrol vessel
- Tonnage: 30 gross tons
- Length: 68 ft (21 m)
- Beam: 14 ft (4.3 m)

USS Pequeni was a United States Navy patrol vessel in commission from 1917 or 1918 to the end of 1918.

Pequeni was built as a motor launch of the same name at Balboa in the Panama Canal Zone for the Panama Canal Company. Sometime in 1917 or 1918, the U.S. Navy acquired her for use as a section patrol boat during World War I. She never received a section patrol (SP) number, but she was commissioned as USS Pequeni.

== Service history ==
Pequeni conducted patrols in the Panama Canal Zone for the rest of World War I. She was stricken from the Navy List on 31 December 1918 and was returned to the Panama Canal Company the same day.
