= USS Pleiades =

USS Pleiades is a name used more than once by the U.S. Navy:

- USS Pleiades (SP-1616) built in 1900 by the Maryland Steel Co., Sparrows Point, Maryland, and served briefly in World War I.
- USS Pleiades (AK-46), commissioned 25 October 1941 for service in World War II.
