= USS Pontus =

1943 motor torpedo boat tender

History

United States
- Name: Pontus
- Namesake: A Latin form of Pontos, a Greek god of the sea
- Builder: Chicago Bridge and Iron Co.
- Laid down: 13 July 1942
- Launched: 2 March 1943
- Commissioned: 24 March 1943 (Reduced Commission), 2 April 1943 (Full Commission)
- Decommissioned: 11 April 1946
- In service: 1943
- Out of service: 1946
- Stricken: 1 May 1946
- Identification: Hull number: AGP-20; Ship International Radio Callsign: NJZO
- Fate: Transferred to the Maritime Commission for disposal, 26 November 1947

General characteristics
- Class & type: LST-1-class tank landing ship / Portunus-class motor torpedo boat tender
- Displacement: 3,755 tons (full load)
- Length: 328 ft (100 m)
- Beam: 50 ft (15 m)
- Propulsion: Diesel engines, twin screws, 1,800 hp (1,300 kW)
- Speed: 12 knots (22 km/h; 14 mph)
- Complement: 119
- Armament: 1 x 3 in (76 mm)/50 dual purpose mount

USS Pontus (AGP-20) was a motor torpedo boat tender in service with the United States Navy during the Second World War. Commissioned in March 1943, during the war she was assigned to the Asiatic-Pacific Theater.

Following the war, USS Pontus was assigned to Occupation service in the Far East from 8 to 20 November 1945. She was decommissioned in 1946 and struck the same year after just 3 years of service. She was transferred to the Maritime Commission for disposal on 26 November 1947. She earned three Battle Stars for World War II Service. Her current status is unknown, most likely scrapped.

== Ship awards ==
- American Campaign Medal
- Asiatic-Pacific Campaign Medal(4)
- World War II Victory Medal
- Navy Occupation Service Medal(with Asia clasp)
- Philippines Liberation Medal
