= USS Positive =

Minesweeper of the United States Navy

History

United States
- Name: Positive
- Laid down: 7 June 1941
- Launched: 7 March 1942
- In service: 20 August 1942
- Out of service: 12 November 1945
- Stricken: 8 May 1946
- Fate: returned to Maritime Commission, 7 November 1946

General characteristics
- Class & type: Acme-class coastal minesweeper
- Displacement: 228 tons (f.)
- Length: 97 ft 1 in (29.59 m)
- Beam: 22 ft (6.7 m)
- Draught: 9 ft 1 in (2.77 m)
- Speed: 10 knots (19 km/h; 12 mph)
- Complement: 17
- Armament: 2 × .50 cal (12.7 mm) machine guns; 4 × .30 cal (7.62 mm) machine guns

USS Positive (AMc-95) was an Acme-class coastal minesweeper acquired by the U.S. Navy for the task of removing naval mines laid in the water to prevent ships from passing.

Positive was laid down 7 June 1941 by the Noank Shipbuilding Co., Noank, Connecticut, launched 7 March 1942 sponsored by Miss Elizabeth W. Dunn, and placed in service 20 August 1942.

== World War II service ==
After shakedown, Positive departed Miami, Florida, 19 February 1943, for Guantanamo Bay, Cuba. After performing minesweeping duty for the Naval Operating Base at Guantanamo, from March 1943 to January 1945, she departed Guantanamo 21 January for San Juan, Puerto Rico. Upon completion of duty, she arrived at Charleston, South Carolina, 7 September. Positive was placed out of service 12 November 1945, and struck from the Naval Vessel Register 8 May 1946. She was delivered for deposal to the Maritime Commission, Charleston, 7 November 1946.
