= USS Politesse =

Patrol vessel of the United States Navy

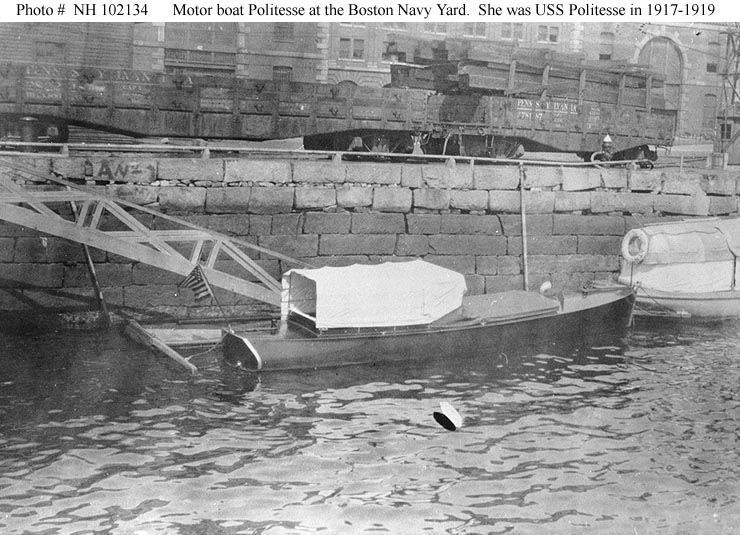
- Politesse as a civilian motorboat at the Boston Navy Yard in Boston, Massachusetts, in 1917, just prior to her United States Navy service as the patrol boat USS Politesse (SP-662).

History

United States
- Name: USS Politesse
- Namesake: Previous name retained
- Builder: J. R. Robertson, Waltham, Massachusetts
- Completed: 1911
- Acquired: 17 April 1917
- Commissioned: 15 April 1917
- Fate: Returned to owner 29 May 1919 or 5 July 1919
- Notes: Operated as private motorboat Politesse 1911-1917 and from 1919

General characteristics
- Type: Patrol vessel
- Length: 29 ft (8.8 m) or 30 ft (9.1 m)
- Beam: 5 ft 5 in (1.65 m)
- Draft: 2 ft 3 in (0.69 m)

USS Politesse (SP-662) was a motorboat that served in the United States Navy as a patrol vessel from 1917 to 1919.

Politesse was built as a civilian motorboat in 1911 by J. R. Robertson at Waltham, Massachusetts, for Frederic C. Hood. In 1917, the U.S. Navy chartered her for use as a patrol boat during World War I. She was commissioned on 15 April 1917 as USS Politesse (SP-662). Apparently, her charter officially went into effect two days later, on 17 April 1917.

Politesse performed patrol duty at Boston, Massachusetts, for the remainder of World War I.

After World War I, the Navy returned Politesse to her owner. Sources differ on the date of the return, giving it as both 29 May 1919 and 5 July 1919.
