= USS Pequot =

Ship name

USS Pequot may refer to the following ships of the United States Navy:

- USS Pequot (1863), a screw gunboat that served in the American Civil War between 1864–1865.
- USS Pequot (ID-2998), the former German cargo ship Ockenfels, seized 1917, and served 1918–1919.
