= USS Pursuit =

The United States Navy lists two ships that bore the name USS Pursuit:

- USS Pursuit (1861) was purchased at New York on 3 September 1861 and was commissioned on 17 December 1861.
- USS Pursuit (AM-108) was a U.S. Navy metal-hulled minesweeper commissioned 30 April 1943.
