= USNS Parkersburg =

History

United States
- Builder: Sun Shipbuilding & Drydock Co. of Chester, Pennsylvania
- Laid down: 30 December 1943
- Launched: 12 April 1944
- Sponsored by: Mrs. Anne L. Curry
- Identification: IMO number: 5270741
- Fate: Sold for scrap, 28 April 1984

General characteristics
- Displacement: 5,782 t.(lt) 21,880 t.(fl)
- Length: 523 ft 6 in (159.56 m)
- Beam: 68 ft (21 m)
- Draught: 30 ft (9.1 m)
- Propulsion: turbo-electric, single screw. 8,000hp
- Speed: 15.5 knots
- Complement: 251

Fleet Oiler USS Parkersburg (AO-163) was laid down 30 December 1943 as the SS Fort Cornwallis MC hull 1731, a Maritime Commission type (T2-SE-A1) by Sun Shipbuilding & Drydock Co. of Chester, Pennsylvania, and launched 12 April 1944; sponsored by Mrs. Anne L. Curry; and acquired by the War Shipping Administration.

== History ==
Under War Shipping Administration the Fort Cornwallis was operated by Speneer Kellogg J: Sons, Ine. as a United States Maritime Commission ship. She was purchased on 17 October 1946 by the Standard Oil Company of New York, N.Y. and renamed 'ESSO Parkeriburg. She was trade in and transferred to United States Maritime Administrationon 5 October 1955 and renamed Parkersburg. In October of 1956 she was transferred to US Navy. On 21 December 1956 the USS Parkersburg was assigned to the Military Sea Transportation Service (MSTS) and placed in service as USNS Parkersburg (T-AO-163). On 27 September 1957 she was returned to the Maritime Administration and struck from the Naval Register. On 5 December 1957 the title transferred to Marine Transportation Line and she was converted to a chemical carrier and renamed SS Marine Eagle. On 11 December 1957 she was entered in to long-term charter to the Du Pont Chemical Company. She was sold on 5 July 1978 to E. I duPont de Nemour & Co. On 28 April 1984 she was scrapped in Taiwan.
