= USS Partridge =

USS Partridge may refer to the following ships of the United States Navy:

- USS Partridge (AM-16), laid down 14 May 1918 by the Chester SB Co., Chester, Pennsylvania
- USS Partridge (AMS-31), laid down as YMS-437 on 3 October 1944
- USS Partridge (AMCU-36), laid down as LCI(L)-1001 by Consolidated Steel Corp., Orange, Texas on 18 April 1944
- USS Partridge (AM-407) an Admirable-class minesweeper was scheduled to be built by Defoe Shipbuilding Co., Bay City, Michigan, but her contract was cancelled on 11 August 1945.
