= USS Phoebe =

USS Phoebe is a name used more than once by the U.S. Navy:

- USS Phoebe (AMc-57), a coastal minesweeper commissioned at Tacoma, Washington, 2 May 1941.
- USS Phoebe (MSC-199), a fleet minesweeper commissioned 29 April 1955.
