= USS Peggy =

Patrol vessel of the United States Navy

History

United States
- Name: USS Peggy
- Namesake: Previous name retained
- Builder: Vanderslice, Camden, New Jersey
- Completed: 1914 or 1915
- Acquired: 14 August 1917
- Commissioned: 14 August 1917
- Fate: Returned to owner 23 November 1918
- Notes: Operated as private motorboat Peggy 1914 or 1915 to 1917 and from 1918

General characteristics
- Type: Patrol vessel
- Length: 30 ft (9.1 m)
- Beam: 8 ft 6 in (2.59 m)
- Draft: 2 ft 6 in (0.76 m)
- Speed: 11 knots
- Armament: 1 × machine gun

USS Peggy (SP-1058) was a United States Navy patrol vessel in commission from 1917 to 1918.

Peggy was built as a private motorboat of the same name in 1914 or 1915 by Vanderslice at Camden, New Jersey. On 14 August 1917, the U.S. Navy acquired her from her owner, G. F. Dieser of Philadelphia, Pennsylvania, for use as a section patrol boat during World War I. She was commissioned the same day as USS Peggy (SP-1072).

Assigned to the 4th Naval District and based at Philadelphia, Peggy conducted patrols for the rest of World War I.

The Navy returned Peggy to Dieser on 23 November 1918.
