= USS Perseus =

USS Perseus is a name used more than once by the U.S. Navy. Perseus is the mythological character and also the name of constellation.

- USCGC Perseus (WPC-114) was built for the U.S. Coast Guard by Bath Iron Works, Bath, Maine, and was delivered 23 April 1932.
- USS Perseus (AF-64) was laid down as Union Victory (MCV hull 683) by the Oregon Shipbuilding Corp., Portland, Oregon, 30 March 1945. She was later assigned as USNS Perseus (T-AF-64).
