= USS Pattina =

Patrol vessel of the United States Navy

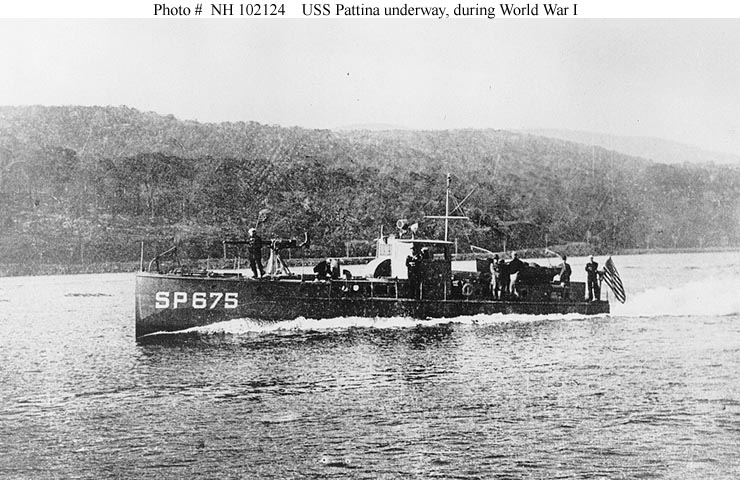
- USS Pattina (SP-675) during World War I.

History

United States
- Name: USS Pattina
- Namesake: Previous name retained
- Awarded: Luders Marine Construction Company, Stamford, Connecticut
- Completed: 1916
- Acquired: 10 September 1917
- Commissioned: 22 October 1917
- Fate: Returned to owner 19 February 1919
- Notes: Operated as private motorboat Pattina 1916–1917 and from 1919

General characteristics
- Type: Patrol vessel
- Tonnage: 31 gross register tons
- Length: 60 ft (18 m)
- Beam: 11 ft 4 in (3.45 m)
- Draft: 3 ft (0.91 m)
- Speed: 25 knots
- Complement: 9
- Armament: 1 × machine gun

USS Pattina (SP-675) was a United States Navy patrol vessel in commission from 1917 to 1919.

Pattina was built as a private motorboat of the same name by the Luders Marine Construction Company at Stamford, Connecticut, in 1916. On 10 September 1917, the U.S. Navy acquired her under a free lease from her owner, B.F. Schwarts, for use as a section patrol boat during World War I. She was commissioned on 22 October 1917 as USS Pattina (SP-675).

Pattina conducted patrols along the United States East Coast for remainder of World War I and into early 1919. She was returned to Schwarts on 19 February 1919.
