= USS Peerless =

USS Peerless is a name that has been used more than once by the United States Navy:

- USS Peerless (1917), originally built as Eagle in 1917 by Union Iron Works, San Francisco, California.
- USS Peerless (AMc-93), a coastal minesweeper, laid down on 14 April 1941 by Delaware Bay Shipbuilding Co., Leesburg, New Jersey.
