= USS Pictor =

USS Pictor is a name used more than once by the United States Navy:

- USS Pictor (AF-27), whose acquisition was canceled on 22 May 1944.
- USS Pictor (AF-54), acquired by the Navy on 13 September 1950 at Suisun Bay, California, and converted to a Provisions Store Ship.
