= USS Pledge =

USS Pledge is the name of two United States Navy minesweepers:

- USS Pledge (AM-277), commissioned in 1944
- USS Pledge (MSO-492), commissioned in 1956
