= USS Portunus =

USS Portunus is a name used more than once by the U.S. Navy:

- USS Portunus (AGP-4), laid down as LST–330 by the Philadelphia Naval Shipyard, 12 November 1942.
- USS Portunus (ARC-1), laid down by the Federal Shipbuilding and Drydock Co., Newark, New Jersey, as LSM–275 1 August 1944.
