= USS Porcupine =

USS Porcupine may refer to:

- USS Porcupine (1813), a schooner on Lake Erie during the War of 1812
- USS Porcupine (IX-126), an Armadillo-class tanker during World War II, sunk by the Japanese
