= USS Pipit =

Two ships of the United States Navy have been assigned the name USS Pipit, after the pipit, a genus of small passerine birds with medium to long tails.

- USS Pipit (AMc-1), built as Spartan in 1936, was acquired by the Navy in 1940. The ship was converted into a coastal minesweeper and placed in service in 1941. She was struck from the Naval List in 1944 and returned to her owner.
- USS Pipit (AM-420) would have been an Admirable-class minesweeper but construction was cancelled in 1945.
