= USS Pocotagligo =

History

United States
- Name: Pocotagligo
- Builder: Marco U. Martinolich
- Launched: 1926
- Acquired: 18 August 1942
- In service: 13 October 1942
- Out of service: 17 March 1943
- Stricken: 28 June 1944
- Fate: Sold 14 March 1945

General characteristics
- Displacement: 60 tons
- Length: 96 ft (29 m)
- Beam: 17 ft 9 in (5.41 m)
- Draft: 12 ft (3.7 m)
- Speed: 12 kn (22 km/h; 14 mph)

USS Pocotagligo (IX-86) was a diesel powered schooner built in 1926 by Marco U. Martinolich in Lussinpiccolo, Italy. It was purchased under the name Marpatcha by the Maritime Commission from her owner Charles Deen Wiman, Moline, Ill. and transferred to the Navy 18 August 1942; renamed Pocotagligo (IX–86), 4 September 1942; and placed in service 13 October 1942.

Assigned to the 7th Naval District during her brief career, she performed patrol duties until placed out of service 17 March 1943. Struck from the Navy List 28 June 1944, she was returned to the Maritime Commission and resold to her former owner 14 March 1945.
