= USS Pokagon =

USS Pokagon has been the name of more than one United States Navy ship, and may refer to:

- USS Pokagon (YT-274), later YTB-274, a harbor tug in service from 1943 to 1946
- USS Pokagon (YTB-746), later YTM-746, a harbor tug in Navy service from 1952 to 1964
- Pokagon (YTB-836), a harbor tug in service since 1975
