= USS Petaluma =

USS Petaluma may refer to:

- USS Petaluma (AOG-69), was a gasoline tanker launched in 1945, renamed Transpet and eventually acquired by British-American Oil
- USNS Petaluma (T-AOG-79), was a gasoline tanker launched in 1945 as MT Racoon Bend
