= USS Pogy =

Two submarines of the United States Navy have been named USS Pogy, after the pogy (or menhaden), a widely harvested but little-known fish:

- USS Pogy (SS-266), a Gato-class submarine, commissioned in 1943 and scrapped in 1959.
- USS Pogy (SSN-647), a Sturgeon-class submarine, commissioned in 1971 and scrapped in 2000.
