= USS Pathfinder =

USS or USNS Pathfinder may refer to:

- USC&GSS Pathfinder (1899–1941) which shows in some photographs as USS Pathfinder and in early years had Navy personnel among the crew.
- USS Pathfinder (AGS-1), launched 1942; in U.S. Navy service from 1942–1946; also known as USC&GS Pathfinder
- USNS Pathfinder (T-AGS-60), launched 1992 and currently in active service
