= USS Paloma =

Patrol vessel of the United States Navy

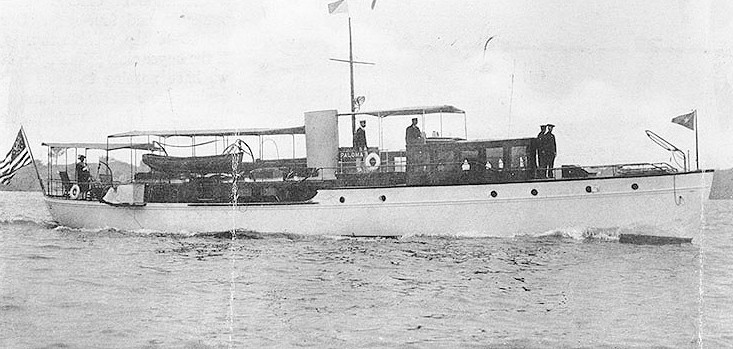
- Halftone reproduction of a photograph of Paloma taken prior to her World War I Navy service.

History

United States
- Name: USS Paloma
- Namesake: A former name retained. A Spanish word for dove.
- Builder: Murray & Tregurthe, South Boston, Massachusetts
- Laid down: date unknown
- Launched: date unknown
- Christened: as the yacht Paloma
- Completed: in 1914 at South Boston, Massachusetts
- Acquired: 17 May 1917
- Commissioned: 4 May 1917 as USS Paloma (SP-533)
- Decommissioned: circa 19 July 1919
- Stricken: 19 July 1919
- Home port: Boston, Massachusetts
- Fate: Sold in July 1919

General characteristics
- Type: Yacht
- Displacement: 52 tons
- Length: 85 ft (26 m)
- Beam: 14 ft (4.3 m)
- Draft: 5 ft (1.5 m)
- Propulsion: internal combustion engine
- Speed: 12 knots (22 km/h)
- Complement: 13 crew members
- Armament: One 1-pounder; one AA machine gun

USS Paloma (SP-533) was an 85-foot (26 m) yacht acquired by the U.S. Navy during World War I. She was outfitted as an armed patrol boat and assigned to patrol the waterways near Boston, Massachusetts. She spent two years of the war patrolling for German submarines, and performing other duties, such as escorting larger ships. After the war, her services were no longer needed, and she was sold.

== Early history ==
Paloma was built by Murray & Tregurthe, South Boston, Massachusetts. The Navy took her over soon after the U.S. entered World War I and placed her in commission on 4 May 1917. She was purchased by the government 17 May 1917.

== World War I service ==
Throughout the "Great War" and for several months after the November 1918 Armistice, she was employed on section patrol duties in the Boston area.

== Post-war decommissioning ==
Paloma was struck from the Naval Register and sold 19 July 1919.
