= USS Plymouth (SP-3308) =

Screw steamer, built 1918

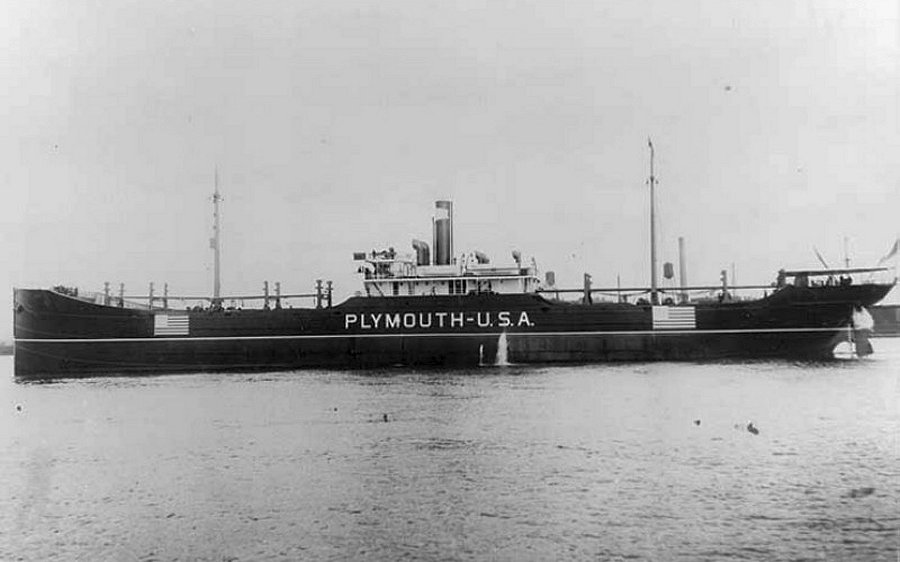

History

United States
- Name: USS Plymouth
- Builder: New York Shipbuilding Company, Camden, New Jersey
- Laid down: 1915
- Acquired: 30 July 1918
- Commissioned: 2 August 1918
- Decommissioned: 25 February 1919
- Fate: Scrapped Wilmington, Delaware 1948

General characteristics
- Type: Screw steamer
- Displacement: 10,750 long tons (10,923 t)
- Length: 395 ft 1 in (120.42 m)
- Beam: 55 ft 2 in (16.81 m)
- Draft: 27 ft (8.2 m)
- Speed: 11 knots (20 km/h; 13 mph)
- Complement: 85 officers and men
- Armament: 1 × 5 in (130 mm) gun; 1 × 3 in (76 mm) gun

USS Plymouth (SP-3308), a screw steamer, was the third ship of the United States Navy to be named for Plymouth, Massachusetts, a town on Plymouth Bay, about 35 miles southeast of Boston, founded by the Pilgrims in 1620.

Plymouth's keel was laid down in 1915 by the New York Shipbuilding Company of Camden, New Jersey, was taken over from the Italian-American Steamship Company by the United States Shipping Board (USSB) and simultaneously transferred to the United States Navy on 30 July 1918 and commissioned at New York Navy Yard on 2 August.

== Service history ==
Assigned to the Naval Overseas Transport Service (NOTS), Plymouth loaded military supplies at Baltimore, Maryland; sailed for Hampton Roads on 21 August 1918 to join a convoy bound for France; and arrived Brest on 11 September. Upon returning to New York City from La Pallice on 17 October, the ship again sailed for France with a United States Army cargo, arriving at St. Nazaire on 9 December 1918.

Plymouth returned to Philadelphia, Pennsylvania, on 10 January 1919 and steamed on to New York City. She decommissioned there on 25 February and transferred to USSB for disposal. She was sold to the Green Star Steamship Company in 1920. She was scrapped in Wilmington, Delaware in 1948.
