= USS Pilgrim =

USS Pilgrim has been the name of more than one United States Navy ship, and may refer to:

- USS Pilgrim (1864), a canal boat purchased to be sunk as a blockship in 1864
- USS Pilgrim (tugboat), a tug in commission from 1870 to 1871
- USS Pilgrim (SP-1204), a patrol vessel in commission from 1917 to 1919

== See also ==
- USS Pilgrim II (YFB-30), a river patrol boat commissioned in 1942 and stricken in 1947
