= USS Pomander =

Patrol vessel of the United States Navy

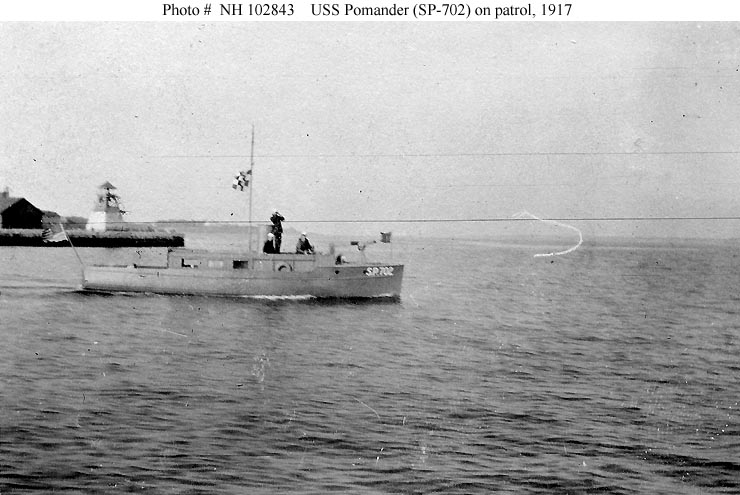
- USS Pomander (SP-702) operating probably in the vicinity of Boston, Massachusetts, ca. summer 1917.

History

United States
- Name: USS Pomander
- Namesake: Previous name retained
- Builder: George Lawley & Son, Neponset, Massachusetts
- Completed: 1916
- Acquired: 29 May 1917
- Commissioned: 1917
- Fate: Returned to owners 5 July 1918
- Notes: Operated as private motorboat Pomander 1916-1917 and from 1918

General characteristics
- Type: Patrol vessel
- Length: 43 ft (13 m)
- Beam: 9 ft (2.7 m)
- Draft: 2 ft 5 in (0.74 m)
- Speed: 18 knots
- Armament: 1 × machine gun

USS Pomander (SP-702) was a United States Navy patrol vessel in commission from 1917 to 1918.

Pomander was built in 1916 as a private motorboat of the same name by George Lawley & Son at Neponset, Massachusetts. On 29 May 1917, the U.S. Navy chartered her from Bertram B. Conrad of Wareham, Massachusetts, for use as a section patrol boat during World War I. She soon was commissioned as USS Pomander (SP-702).

Assigned to the 2nd Naval District in southern New England, Pomander carried out patrol duties for a time but eventually was deemed unfit for naval service and was returned to Lorenzo E. Anderson and Breckinridge Jones on 5 July 1918.
