= USS Phillips =

Patrol vessel of the United States Navy

History

United States
- Name: USS Phillips, later USS SP-1389
- Namesake: Phillips was her previous name retained; SP-1389 was her section patrol number
- Builder: William R. Osborn, Croton, New York
- Completed: 1901
- Acquired: 1917 or 1918
- Commissioned: 1917 or 1918
- Fate: Returned to owner 22 October 1918
- Notes: Operated as tug Phillips prior to U.S. Navy service

General characteristics
- Type: Patrol vessel
- Tonnage: 36 tons
- Length: 64 ft (20 m)
- Beam: 16 ft (4.9 m)
- Draft: 4 ft (1.2 m)
- Propulsion: Steam engine
- Speed: 8 knots

USS Phillips (SP-1389), later USS SP-1389, was a tug that served in the United States Navy as a patrol vessel during World War I.

Phillips was a steam-powered tug built in 1901 by William R. Osborn at Croton, New York. During the period of American participation in World War I, the U.S. Navy acquired her under charter from the Commonwealth of Virginia and placed her in commission as USS Phillips (SP-1389).

Phillips performed patrol duties based at Norfolk, Virginia, during the war, at some point being renamed USS SP-1389.

SP-1389 was returned to her owner on 22 October 1918.
