= USS Prevail =

USS Prevail may refer to the following ships operated by the United States Navy or United States Military Sealift Command:

- USS Prevail (AM-107), a Auk-class minesweeper during World War II
- Prevail (IX-537), a Stalwart-class ocean surveillance ship
