= USS Passaic =

USS Passaic is a name used more than once by the U.S. Navy:

- USS Passaic (1862), a single turreted, coastal monitor, built by Continental Iron Works, Greenpoint, Brooklyn, under subcontract from John Ericsson, was launched 30 August 1862; and commissioned 25 November 1862.
- USS Passaic (YT-20), was commissioned USS Pontiac (YT-20), 1 July 1911.
- USS Passaic (AN-87), originally authorized as YN–1 13); redesignated AN–87 on 17 January 1944; laid down at Leathem D. Smith Shipbuilding Company, Sturgeon Bay, Wisconsin. 25 April 1944; launched 29 June 1944.
