= USS Pasadena =

Three vessels of the United States Navy have been named USS Pasadena, after the city of Pasadena, California.

- The first USS Pasadena (1918) was a cargo ship in use in 1918 and 1919.
- The second USS Pasadena (CL-65) was a light cruiser in service from 1944 to 1950.
- The third USS Pasadena (SSN-752) is a Los Angeles-class nuclear attack submarine commissioned in 1989.
