= USS Plover =

USS Plover is a name the United States Navy has used more than once in naming a vessel:

- USS Plover (AM-12), Lapwing-class minesweeper, but construction of this ship was cancelled 4 December 1918
- USS Plover (AM-408), Admirable-class minesweeper, construction was cancelled on 11 August 1945
- USS Plover (AMc-3), minesweeper purchased on 16 October 1940
- USS Plover (AMS-33), laid down 12 October 1943 by Hiltebrant Dry Dock Co., Kingston, New York.
