= USS Penobscot =

USS Penobscot is a name used more than once by the U.S. Navy:

- USS Penobscot (1861), a gunboat launched 19 November 1861.
- USS Penobscot (SP-982), a tug placed in service 29 August 1917.
- USS Penobscot (ATA-188), a tug launched 11 September 1944.
