= USS Preston (1865) =

Gunboat of the United States Navy

History

United States
- Name: USS Preston
- In service: 1865
- Out of service: 1865
- Captured: by Union Navy forces; February 1865
- Fate: Sold, 17 September 1868

General characteristics
- Type: Gunboat
- Displacement: 230 long tons (234 t)
- Length: 160 ft (49 m)
- Beam: 12 ft (3.7 m)
- Propulsion: Steam engine

The USS Preston was a blockade-running steamer captured by the Union Navy during the American Civil War.

She was placed in service in Port Royal, South Carolina, by the Union Navy as a gunboat during blockade operations against the Confederate States of America.

== Service history ==
Preston, a "cigar shaped steamer" used to transport cotton, was captured in the harbor of Charleston, South Carolina, in February 1865. Renamed Preston and operated under the command of Acting Ensign William Thomas, she was assigned to the South Atlantic Blockading Squadron and stationed at Port Royal, South Carolina, until August 1865. Then ordered north, she arrived at Washington, D.C., on 21 August and was placed in ordinary. She was sold at auction on 17 September 1868.

== See also ==
- Blockade runners of the American Civil War
- Blockade mail of the Confederacy
