= USS Pinnacle =

USS Pinnacle is the name of two ships of the U.S. Navy:

- USS Pinnacle (AM-274), a minesweeper in naval service 1944–46
- USS Pinnacle (MSO-462), an ocean minesweeper in service 1955–1977
