= USS Pratt =

USS Pratt may refer to:

- USS Pratt (DE-363), a destroyer escort
- USS William V. Pratt, a destroyer
