= USS Pawtucket =

Tugboat of the United States Navy

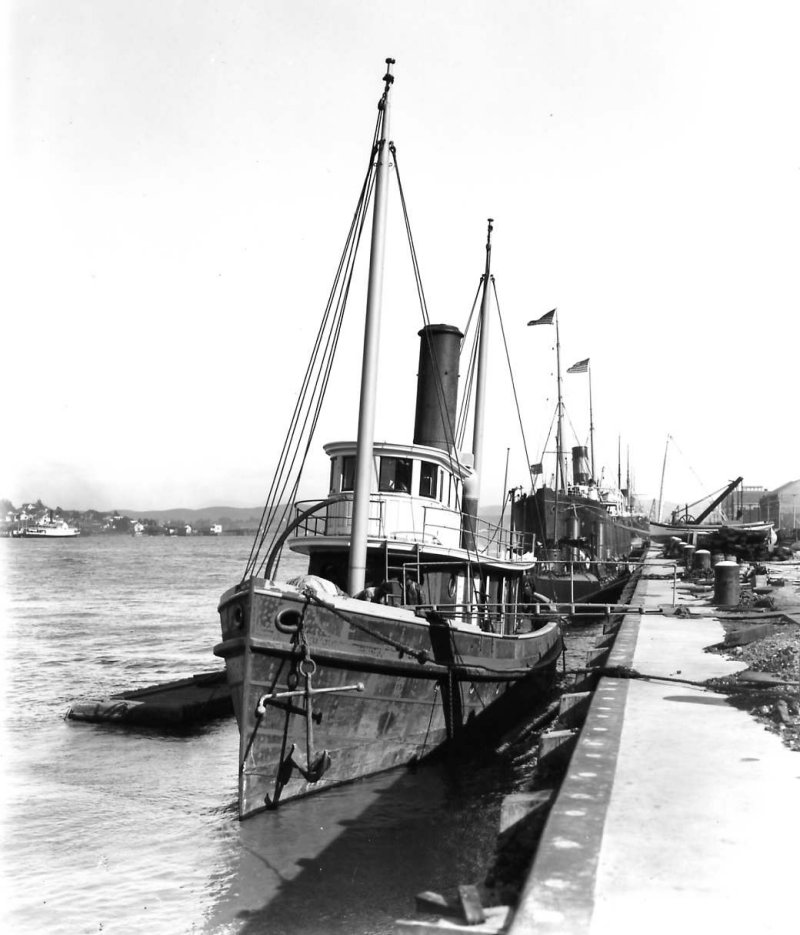
- Pawtucket in 1899

History

United States
- Name: USS Pawtucket
- Ordered: 3 March 1897
- Builder: Mare Island Navy Yard, California
- Laid down: 22 July 1898
- Launched: 17 November 1898
- Commissioned: 1 January 1899
- Decommissioned: 13 December 1946
- Reclassified: YT-7, 17 July 1920; YTM-7, 15 May 1944
- Home port: Puget Sound Navy Yard
- Fate: Sold and scrapped, 1947

General characteristics
- Type: Tugboat
- Displacement: 225 long tons (229 t)
- Length: 92 ft 6 in (28.19 m)
- Beam: 21 ft 1 in (6.43 m)
- Draft: 8 ft 9 in (2.67 m)
- Propulsion: Steam, single screw
- Speed: 12.2 knots (22.6 km/h; 14.0 mph)
- Complement: 9 (orig.); 16 (World War II)
- Armament: 3 × 1-pounder guns (orig.); 1 × single 20 mm AA (World War II)

USS Pawtucket (Harbor Tug No. 7/YT-7/YTM-7), was a district harbor tug serving in the United States Navy in the early 20th century, during both World War I and World War II. This was the first of two US Navy namesakes of the city of Pawtucket, Rhode Island, and the Native American tribe bearing the same name.

== Service history ==
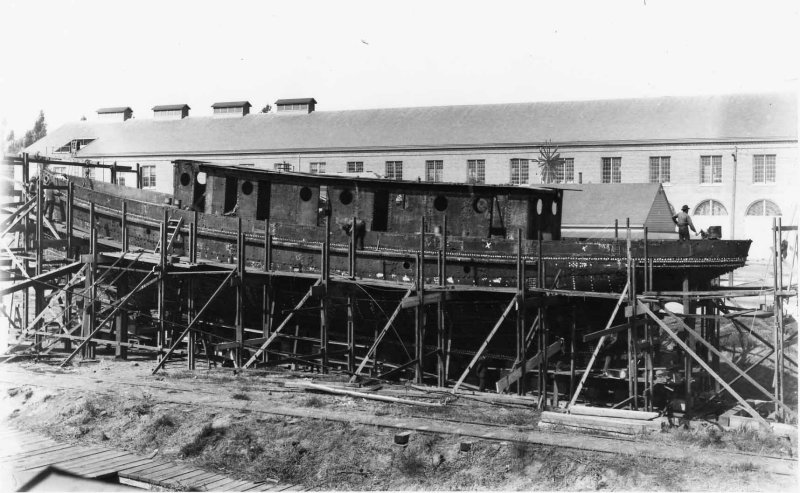
Pawtucket in 1898.

Pawtucket was ordered on 3 March 1897, laid down at Mare Island Navy Yard in California on 22 July 1898, and launched on 17 November 1898, christened by five year old Heather Baxter, daughter of Naval Constructor W. J. Baxter. The 19th century designation "Harbor Tug No.7" was officially replaced with "YT-7" (District harbor tug) on 17 July 1920.

Pawtucket's entire career was spent on the Pacific coast, active in the 13th Naval District, the Puget Sound Navy Yard being her permanent base for more than thirty years. During World War II she was armed with a single 20 mm gun and served as a patrol craft and minesweeper in the Puget Sound area, with an increased complement of 16. Pawtucket was redesignated "YTM-7" on 15 May 1944.

At the war's end, Pawtucket was declared surplus, placed out of service on 13 December 1946, and transferred to the Maritime Commission. She was then sold to the Northeast Merchandising Service, which operated her briefly in Puget Sound before scrapping her in 1947.

== Personnel ==
- Robert Witcher Copeland (CO, 1940s)
