= USS Puffer =

Two ships of the United States Navy have borne the name USS Puffer, named in honor of the pufferfish, which inflates its body with air.

- USS Puffer (SS-268) was a Gato-class submarine, commissioned in 1943 and struck in 1960.
- USS Puffer (SSN-652) was a Sturgeon-class submarine, commissioned in 1969 and struck in 1996.
