= USS Phlox =

Union Navy steamer

History

United States
- Ordered: as F. W. Lincoln
- Laid down: date unknown
- Launched: 1864
- Acquired: 2 August 1864
- Commissioned: 14 September 1864
- Decommissioned: 28 July 1865
- In service: 1865
- Out of service: 1873
- Stricken: 1873 (est.)
- Home port: Annapolis, Maryland
- Fate: Transferred to the U.S. Naval Academy, Annapolis, Maryland, 1865

General characteristics
- Displacement: 317 tons
- Length: 145 ft (44 m)
- Beam: 24 ft (7.3 m)
- Draught: depth of hold 9 ft (2.7 m); draft 6 ft (1.8 m)
- Propulsion: steam engine; side wheel-propelled
- Speed: 12 knots
- Complement: 32
- Armament: not known

USS Phlox was a steamer commissioned by the Union Navy during the American Civil War. She served the Union Navy's struggle against the Confederate States of America as a gunboat; and, after the war's end, she served the midshipmen at the United States Naval Academy in Annapolis, Maryland, as a training ship.

== Steamer constructed in Boston, Massachusetts, in 1864 ==
Phlox, a wooden side wheel steamer built at Boston, Massachusetts, in 1864 as F. W. Lincoln, was purchased by the Union Navy from McKay & Aldus 2 August 1864; renamed Phlox the same day; and commissioned at Boston Navy Yard 14 September 1864, Act. Ens. Douglas F. O’Brien in command.

== Assigned to the North Atlantic blockade ==
Assigned to the North Atlantic Blockading Squadron, Phlox steamed south late in September and operated in the James River helping maintain communications among the Union ships, supporting General Ulysses S. Grant’s operations against Richmond, Virginia.

=== Supporting the attack on Fort Fisher ===
In January 1865 she steamed to Wilmington, North Carolina, to support the joint Army–Navy attack on Fort Fisher, North Carolina, which doomed Wilmington.

After Fort Fisher fell, Phlox returned to the James River where she served through the end of the war.

== Post-war service with the U.S. Naval Academy in Annapolis ==
Phlox decommissioning at the Washington Navy Yard 28 July 1865. Later that year Phlox was moved to Annapolis, Maryland, and subsequently served in a non-commissioned status as practice ship for midshipmen at the U.S. Naval Academy until 1873.
