= Priscilla (SP-44) =

Patrol vessel of the United States Navy

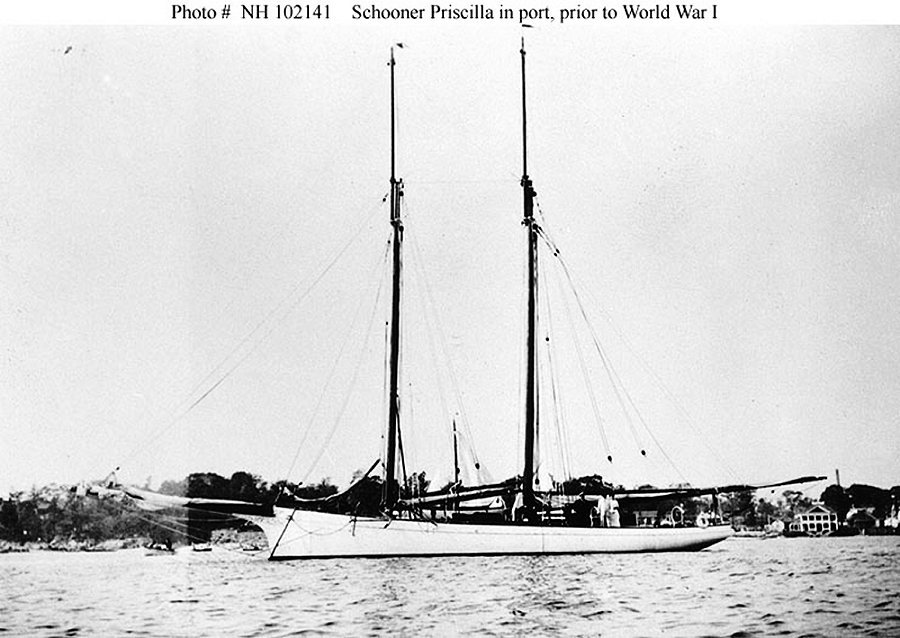
- Priscilla before the United States entered World War I.

History

United States
- Name: Priscilla
- Namesake: Previous name retained
- Builder: David Clark, Kennebunkport, Maine
- Completed: 1884
- Acquired: 19 June 1917
- Commissioned: Never
- Fate: Returned to owner 17 December 1917
- Notes: Registered as SP-44 for potential U.S. Navy service

General characteristics
- Type: Patrol vessel (proposed)
- Tonnage: 36 tons
- Length: 67 ft (20 m)
- Beam: 17 ft 4 in (5.28 m)
- Draft: 9 ft 6 in (2.90 m)
- Speed: 6 knots (11 km/h; 6.9 mph)

USS Priscilla (SP-44) was the proposed designation for an auxiliary schooner that never actually served in the United States Navy.

Priscilla was built in 1884 by David Clark at Kennebunkport, Maine. Her owner, Frederick S. Fisher of New Rochelle, New York, delivered her to the U.S. Navy for possible World War I service on 19 June 1917. The Navy gave her the Section Patrol registry SP-44, but never commissioned her. The Navy returned her to Fisher on 17 December 1917.
