= USS Picket =

USS Picket may refer to the following ships of the United States Navy:

- USS Picket, bought 1862, headquarters of General Burnside during the Battle of Roanoke Island.
- USS Picket (ACM-8), completed 15 April 1942 by Marietta Manufacturing Co., Point Pleasant, West Virginia
- USS Picket (YAGR-7), laid down 28 March 1945 as SS James F. Harrell by J. A. Jones Construction Co., Panama City, Florida
