= USS Pauline =

Patrol vessel of the United States Navy

History

United States
- Name: USS Pauline
- Namesake: Previous name retained
- Builder: Everett Shaw Company, Cutler, Maine
- Acquired: 28 June 1917
- Commissioned: 2 July 1917
- Fate: Returned to owner 28 January 1919
- Notes: Operated as civilian motorboat Pauline until 1917 and from 1919

General characteristics
- Type: Patrol vessel
- Tonnage: 8 gross register tons
- Displacement: 40 tons
- Length: 42 ft (13 m)
- Beam: 12 ft (3.7 m)
- Draft: 3 ft 2 in (0.97 m)
- Speed: 10 knots
- Complement: 3
- Armament: 1 × machine gun

USS Pauline (SP-658) was a United States Navy patrol vessel in commission from 1917 to 1919.

Pauline was built as a civilian motorboat of the same name by the Everett Shaw Company at Cutler, Maine. On 28 June 1917, the U.S. Navy acquired her from her owner, the Maine Fish Patrol, for use as a section patrol boat during World War I. She was commissioned as USS Pauline (SP-658) on 2 July 1917.

Based at Boston, Massachusetts, Pauline served on patrol duties for the rest of World War I.

Pauline was returned to the Maine Fish Patrol on 28 January 1919.
