= USS Panama =

Patrol vessel of the United States Navy

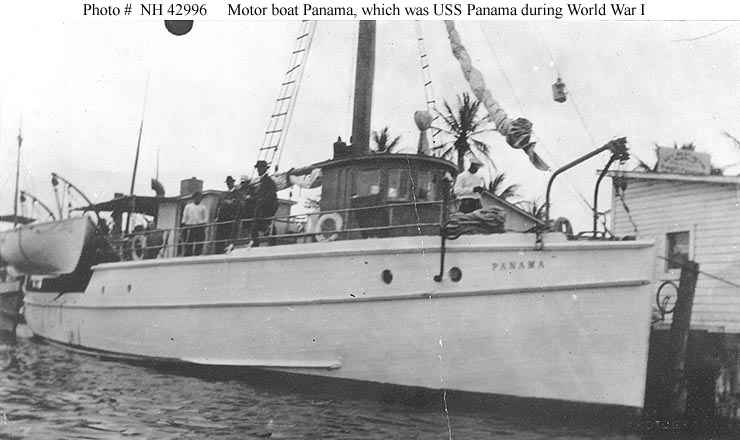
- Panama as a civilian motorboat, sometime between 1914 and 1917.

History

United States
- Name: USS Panama
- Namesake: Previous name retained
- Builder: Luther Finder, Key West, Florida
- Completed: 1914
- Acquired: 29 April 1917
- Commissioned: 26 May 1917
- Fate: Transferred to United States Department of Agriculture 4 November 1920
- Notes: Operated as private motorboat Panama 1914-1917

General characteristics
- Type: Patrol vessel
- Displacement: 78 tons
- Length: 78 ft (24 m)
- Beam: 21 ft (6.4 m)
- Draft: 4 ft (1.2 m)
- Speed: 9.5 knots
- Armament: 1 × 3-pounder gun; 1 × machine gun

USS Panama (SP-101) was an armed motorboat that served in the United States Navy as a patrol vessel from 1917 to 1920.

Panama was built as a civilian motorboat in 1914 by Luther Finder, at Key West, Florida. During her period in commercial service, she saw extensive use in laying underwater telegraph cable for Western Union in and around Key West, and may also have been used as a passenger ship.

The U.S. Navy acquired Panama from the Miami and Nassau Passenger Line on 29 April 1917 for use as a patrol boat during World War I. She was commissioned on 26 May 1917 as USS Panama (SP-101).

Panama was assigned to the 7th Naval District, headquartered at Key West. She patrolling in and around Key West during the war and occasionally operated in Caribbean waters. On 24 August 1918, during a voyage from the Panama Canal Zone to the United States, she sighted two possible German submarines on her port bow. She pursued them until dark, despite heavy weather which prevented a surface attack.

Panama was transferred to the United States Department of Agriculture on 4 November 1920.
