= USS Poinsett =

USS Poinsett is a name used more than once by the United States Navy:

- USS Poinsett (1840), a sidewheel gunboat, was transferred from the War Department to the Navy Department in 1840 for service in the Second Seminole War.
- USS Poinsett (AK-205), launched 22 May 1944.
