= USS Pampero =

Cargo ship of the United States Navy

History

United States
- Name: USS Pampero
- Launched: 18 August 1853
- Acquired: 7 July 1861
- Commissioned: August 1861
- Decommissioned: 20 July 1866
- Fate: Sold, 1 October 1867

General characteristics
- Displacement: 1,375 long tons (1,397 t)
- Length: 202 ft 3 in (61.65 m)
- Beam: 38 ft 2 in (11.63 m)
- Draft: 20 ft (6.1 m)
- Depth of hold: 19 ft 1 in (5.82 m)
- Propulsion: Sail
- Sail plan: Full ship rig
- Complement: 50
- Armament: 4 × 32-pounders

USS Pampero was a large (1,375 long tons (1,397 t)) and capacious ship-rigged vessel purchased by the Union Navy during the American Civil War. She was used by the Navy as a storeship to provision the fleet and as a collier to supply the fleet’s need for coal for their steam engines.

She served in, and supplied, several blockades, including those Union ships in the Gulf of Mexico which were patrolling off various Gulf ports of the Confederate States of America.

== Service history ==
Pampero, a wooden, ship rigged vessel launched at Mystic, Connecticut on 18 August 1853 by Charles Mallory, was purchased by the Navy at New York City on 7 July 1861 from J. Bishop & Co.; and commissioned in August 1861, Acting Master Charles W. Lamson in command. Pampero was assigned to the Gulf Blockading Squadron for service as a storeship and collier, and arrived off Fort Pickens, Florida on 19 September. She supplied the ships and bases of the Squadron until it was divided in February 1862. She was then placed in the West Gulf Blockading Squadron and supporting Rear Admiral David Farragut’s operations through much of the war, making occasional voyages north to replenish. She decommissioned at New York City on 20 July 1866 and was sold at auction there on 1 October 1867.
