= USS Passaconaway =

USS Passaconaway is a name used more than once by the U.S. Navy:

- USS Passaconaway (1863), a monitor built during the American Civil War.
- USS Passaconaway (AN-86), a net laying ship built during World War II.
