= USS Philippine Sea =

USS Philippine Sea may refer to:

- USS Philippine Sea (CV-47), was an aircraft carrier in service from 1946 to 1958
- USS Philippine Sea (CG-58), was a guided missile cruiser in service from 1989 to 2025
