= USS Prime =

USS Prime is the name of two ships of the U.S. Navy:

- USS Prime (AM-279), a minesweeper in naval service 1944–46.
- USS Prime (AM-466), minesweeper commissioned in 1954, reclassified as MSO-466 in 1955, stricken in 1976.
