= USS Port Fire =

Tugboat of the United States Navy

History

United States
- Launched: 8 March 1864
- Commissioned: 1864
- Decommissioned: 1865
- Fate: Sold, January 1878

General characteristics
- Displacement: 103 tons
- Propulsion: steam engine; screw-propelled

USS Port Fire was a steamer commissioned by the Union Navy during the American Civil War.

She served the navy fleet during the blockade of ports and waterways of the Confederate States of America as an ammunition ship.

== Service history ==
Port Fire, a screw tug, built at the Portsmouth Navy Yard, Kittery, Maine, in 1863, was launched 8 March 1864. She served through the Civil War as a powder tug. Port Fire was sold in January 1878. She was later broken up at Portsmouth, New Hampshire.
