= USS Pete =

Patrol vessel of the United States Navy

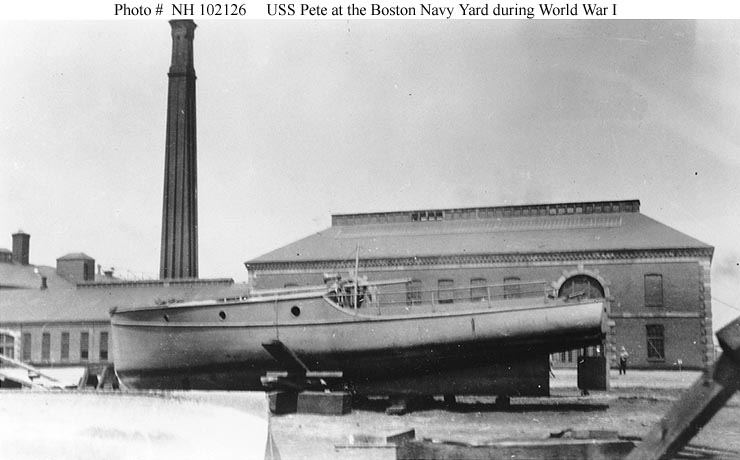
- USS Pete (SP-596) hauled out of the water at the Boston Navy Yard at Boston, Massachusetts, sometime between April 1917 and March 1918.

History

United States
- Name: USS Pete
- Namesake: Previous name retained
- Builder: Chubbuck, Kingston, Massachusetts
- Acquired: 28 April 1917
- Commissioned: 1917
- Decommissioned: 1918
- Fate: Returned to owner 26 March 1918
- Notes: Operated as private motorboat Pete until April 1917 and from March 1918

General characteristics
- Type: Patrol vessel
- Length: 29 ft (8.8 m)
- Beam: 8 ft (2.4 m)
- Armament: 1 × machine gun

USS Pete (SP-596) was a United States Navy patrol vessel in commission from 1917 to 1918.

Pete was built as a private motorboat of the same name by Chubbuck at Kingston, Massachusetts. On 28 April 1917, the U.S. Navy chartered her from her owner, E. C. Potter, for use as a section patrol boat during World War I. She was commissioned as USS Pete (SP-596).

Assigned to the 1st Naval District in northern New England and based at Boston, Massachusetts, Pete carried out patrol duties until March 1918.

Pete was returned to Potter on 26 March 1918.
