= USS Pintail =

Minesweeper of the United States Navy

History

United States
- Ordered: as Three Star
- Laid down: date unknown
- Launched: 1937
- Acquired: 19 November 1940
- In service: 18 February 1941
- Out of service: 30 March 1945
- Stricken: 30 March 1945
- Fate: Sold at auction c. 1945

General characteristics
- Displacement: 210 tons
- Length: 84 ft 9 in (25.83 m)
- Beam: 22 ft 0 in (6.71 m)
- Draught: 8 ft 6 in (2.59 m)
- Speed: 9.0 knots
- Complement: 17
- Armament: one machine gun

USS Pintail (AMc-17) was a coastal minesweeper acquired by the U.S. Navy for the dangerous task of removing mines from minefields laid in the water to prevent ships from passing.

Pintail, built in 1937 as Three Star by the Kruse and Banks Shipbuilding Co., North Bend, Oregon, was purchased by the Maritime Commission from the MacPhister Van Camp Canning Co., San Pedro, California, and transferred to the Navy 19 November 1940; renamed Pintail (AMc–17), 7 December 1940; converted by the Western Boat Building Co., Tacoma, Washington; and placed in service 18 February 1941.

== World War II service ==
As Pintail, the former purse-seiner. operated as a coastal minesweeper in the 13th Naval District.

== Post-war deactivation ==
Pintail was placed out of service and struck from the Navy List 30 March 1945. She was redelivered to the Maritime Commission 23 July 1945 and subsequently sold at auction.
