= USS Philippines =

The name USS Philippines has been used twice by the United States Navy:

- The first USS Philippines (ID-1677) was a troop transport used during 1919.
- The second USS Philippines (CB-4) was to have been a large cruiser, but was cancelled in 1943.
