= HMS Precept =

History

United Kingdom
- Name: HMS Precept (Z266)
- Builder: Barbour Boat Works; New Bern, North Carolina
- Laid down: 5 August 1943
- Launched: 11 April 1944
- Completed: 14 October 1944
- Acquired: 14 October 1944
- Fate: returned to U.S. Navy, 4 January 1946

History

United States
- Acquired: 4 January 1946
- Stricken: 28 March 1946
- Fate: transferred to the Maritime Commission, 21 March 1947, for disposal

General characteristics
- Class & type: Ailanthus-class net laying ship
- Displacement: 1,190 long tons (1,210 t) (full)
- Length: 194 ft 6 in (59.28 m)
- Beam: 37 ft (11 m)
- Draught: 13 ft 6 in (4.11 m)
- Propulsion: diesel electric, 2,500 hp (1,900 kW)
- Speed: 13 knots (24 km/h)
- Complement: 56
- Armament: 1 × 3"/50 caliber gun; 4 × twin 20 mm gun mounts

HMS Precept (Z266) was a net laying ship for the Royal Navy during the Second World War acquired from the United States Navy in October 1944 via Lend-Lease.

The ship was laid down as Precept (YN-79), a net tender of the Ailanthus class, on 5 August 1943 at Barbour Boat Works in New Bern, North Carolina. On 17 January 1944, while still under construction, the ship was reclassified as a net laying ship and redesignated AN-73. Precept was launched on 11 April and completed on 13 October.

After delivery to the U.S. Navy on 14 October, she was transferred to the United Kingdom under Lend-Lease the same day and commissioned into the Royal Navy as HMS Precept (Z266). Upon completion of wartime duty with the United Kingdom, she arrived at Norfolk, Virginia, on 22 October 1945, and was returned to the U.S. Navy on 4 January 1946. Struck from the Naval Vessel Register on 28 March 1946, she was transferred to the United States Maritime Commission on 21 March 1947 and sold.
