= USS Proton =

Cargo ship of the United States Navy

History

United States
- Name: USS Proton
- Namesake: An elementary particle found in atomic nuclei, that carries a positive charge numerically equal to the charge of an electron
- Builder: Bethlehem Hingham Shipyard, Hingham, Massachusetts
- Laid down: 27 March 1945
- Launched: 25 April 1945
- Commissioned: 15 May 1945 as USS LST-1078
- Decommissioned: 29 April 1948, at San Diego, California
- In service: February 1951 as USS Proton (AKS-28) at Mare Island Naval Shipyard
- Out of service: 22 April 1958, at Naval Supply Center, Oakland, California
- Reclassified: AG-147 in January 1949
- Stricken: 1 January 1959
- Fate: 1 January 1959

General characteristics
- Class & type: LST-542-class tank landing ship
- Displacement: 1,625 tons light; 4,080 tons full load
- Length: 328 ft (100 m)
- Beam: 50 ft (15 m)
- Draft: 14 ft 1 in (4.29 m)
- Propulsion: two General Motors 12-567 diesel engines, two shafts, twin rudders
- Speed: 11.6 knots
- Complement: 119 officers and enlisted
- Armament: eight single 40 mm AA gun mounts

USS Proton (AG-147/AKS-28) -- also known as USS LST-1078 – was an LST-542-class tank landing ship launched by the U.S. Navy during the final months of World War II. Proton served as a troop ship, a cargo ship and as an electronic parts supply ship for the U.S. Pacific Fleet and was decommissioned following the Korean War.

== Constructed at Hingham, Massachusetts ==
LST–1078 was laid down 27 March 1945 by Bethlehem Shipbuilding Co., Hingham, Massachusetts; launched 25 April 1945; and commissioned 15 May 1945.

== World War II-related service ==
Following shakedown in Chesapeake Bay, LST–1078 departed New York, New York, 22 June 1945, and proceeded via the Panama Canal to Pearl Harbor, arriving 21 July.

Departing Hawaiian waters 31 August, she debarked Army occupation troops at Wakayama, Japan, 29 September. Proceeding to Lingayen Gulf, Philippine Islands, she embarked troops, and returned to Wakayama. Departing Japan 4 November, she sailed via Guam and Tinian to Pearl Harbor, arriving 6 December. Upon completion of shuttle duty and training in Hawaiian waters, she sailed 7 October 1946 for San Francisco, California, arriving 18 October.

After overhaul, she sailed via Pearl Harbor and Shanghai, China, to Qingdao, China, where she served from January to October 1947. Departing on the 8th, she arrived San Pedro, California, 8 November. LST–1078 decommissioned 29 April 1948 at San Diego, California, where she entered the Pacific Reserve Fleet.

== Korean War operations ==
LST–1078 became Proton (AG–147) in January 1949. Returned to active status in February 1951, Proton underwent conversion to AKS–28 at Mare Island Naval Shipyard.

During the Korean War, she performed electronic supply and repair duties in Japan. Her support role required shuttling between Sasebo and Yokosuka, Japan, from 1 June 1952 to 5 June 1954. Arriving Subic Bay, Philippine Islands, 23 September, she carried out supply operations there and at Manila Bay. Returning to Sasebo 11 January 1955, she issued and repaired electronic equipment there and at Yokosuka. Following arrival at Subic Bay 13 December, she returned to Sasebo 9 February 1956. She arrived in Yokosuka 26 August, and then returned to Sasebo 26 November. She remained in Sasebo from 27 November 1956 to 30 April 1957, serving the U.S. 7th Fleet until sailing for home 20 November.

== Post-war decommissioning ==
Arriving Naval Supply Center, Oakland, California, 22 December, Proton was placed out of commission, in reserve, 22 April 1958. She was struck from the Naval Vessel Register 1 January 1959.
