= USS Pasig =

USS Pasig may refer to the following ships of the United States Navy:

- USS Pasig (AO-89) (1917), formerly SS J. C. Donnell, briefly acquired by the U.S. Navy in World War II; scrapped in 1947
- USS Pasig (AW-3) (1944), formerly the tanker SS Mission San Xavier, acquired by the U.S. Navy in World War II and converted to distilling ship
