= USS Puerto Rico =

USS Puerto Rico may refer to:

- USS Puerto Rico (CB-5) was a planned Alaska-class cruiser whose construction was canceled in 1943
- USNS Puerto Rico (HST-2) was the former name of a high speed ferry acquired by the U.S. Navy in 2012
- USNS Puerto Rico (T-EPF-11) is a Spearhead-class expeditionary fast transport
