= Puritan (ACM-16) =

Auxiliary minelayer for the U.S. Army and later, the Navy

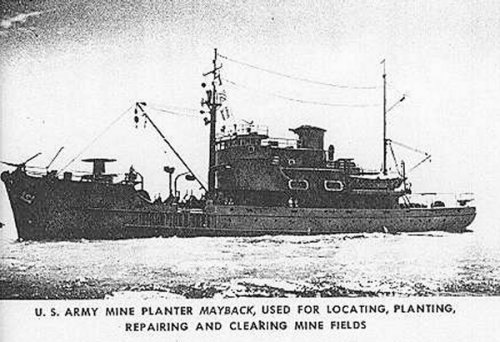

History

United States
- Name: Puritan
- Launched: as USAMP Col. Alfred A. Maybach MP-13 for the US Army
- Acquired: by the US Navy, 7 March 1951
- Renamed: Puritan, 1 May 1955
- Reclassified: ACM-16, 7 March 1951; MMA-16, 7 February 1955
- Stricken: 1959
- Identification: IMO number: 7308009
- Fate: Sold 1961, sank 13 February 1984

General characteristics
- Class & type: ACM-11 class minelayer
- Displacement: 1,300 long tons (1,321 t) full
- Length: 189 ft (58 m)
- Beam: 37 ft (11 m)
- Draft: 12 ft (3.7 m)
- Speed: 12 knots (22 km/h; 14 mph)
- Complement: 65
- Armament: 1 × 20 mm gun

Puritan (ACM-16/MMA-16) was built for the United States Army as U.S. Army Mine Planter (USAMP) Col. Alfred A. Maybach MP-13. The ship was transferred to the United States Navy and classified as an auxiliary minelayer. Puritan was never commissioned and thus never bore the "United States Ship" (USS) prefix showing status as a commissioned ship of the U.S. Navy.

== Acquisition by the U.S. Navy ==
Puritan was originally the Army mine planter USAMP Col. Alfred A. Maybach MP-13. Her transfer to the U.S. Navy was approved on 7 March 1951.

== Out of Commission Status ==
Upon transfer she was placed out of commission in reserve as the Auxiliary Mine Layer ACM-16, assigned to the San Francisco Group, Pacific Reserve Fleet. On 7 February 1955 she was reclassified as the Minelayer, Auxiliary MMA-16. She was named Puritan effective 1 May 1955. She remained out of commission in reserve berthed at Mare Island.

== Disposal ==
She was struck from the Navy Directory in 1959 and sold in 1961.
