= USS Peter C. Struven =

Patrol vessel of the United States Navy

History

United States
- Name: USS Peter C. Struven
- Namesake: A former name retained
- Builder: E. James Tull, Pocomoke City, Maryland
- Completed: 1907
- Decommissioned: 1 July 1919
- In service: 9 August 1917
- Fate: Sold in July 1919 to Lewes Oil and Chemical of Lewes, Delaware

General characteristics
- Type: fishing steamer, converted to patrol craft
- Tonnage: 254 short tons (230 t)
- Length: 152 ft (46 m)
- Beam: 22 ft (6.7 m)
- Depth: 9.5 ft (2.9 m)
- Propulsion: steam engine
- Speed: 11.5 knots (13.2 mph; 21.3 km/h)
- Complement: 36
- Armament: One 1-pounder

USS Peter C. Struven (SP-332) was a 152-foot (46 m) patrol boat in the United States Navy, placed in service 9 August 1917. She was a steel-hulled steamboat and had been originally used as a fishing boat.

The Peter C. Struven was assigned to the 5th Naval District and patrolled the area of Hampton Roads and Elizabeth River during World War I. She was sold to Lewes Oil and Chemical on 1 July 1919.

== See also ==
- USS Joseph F. Bellows (SP-323)
