= USS Puffin =

Minesweeper of the United States Navy

History

United States
- Ordered: as Mary Jane
- Laid down: 1936
- Launched: 1936
- Acquired: 25 November 1940
- Commissioned: 2 May 1941
- Decommissioned: 18 February 1944
- Stricken: 29 July 1947
- Fate: fate unknown

General characteristics
- Displacement: 225 tons
- Length: 90 ft 2 in (27.48 m)
- Beam: 20 ft 0 in (6.10 m)
- Draught: 10 ft 6 in (3.20 m)
- Speed: 9 knots
- Complement: unknown
- Armament: four .50 cal (12.7 mm) machine guns

USS Puffin (AMc-29) was a coastal minesweeper acquired by the U.S. Navy for the dangerous task of removing mines from minefields laid in the water to prevent ships from passing.

Puffin was built as wooden dragger Mary Jane by Snow Shipyard, Rockland, Maine, in 1936; acquired by the Navy 25 November 1940; and commissioned 2 May 1941.

== World War II service ==
She was assigned to the 1st Naval District with a homeyard of Boston, Massachusetts. From 2 May to 8 December 1941 she operated out of Boston on inshore patrol. From then until 11 May 1943, she was part of the local defense force at Portsmouth, New Hampshire. For the next nine months she continued to operate on the U.S. East Coast.

== End-of-service ==
Puffin decommissioned at Boston 18 February 1944, and, on 12 June 1944, was reclassified Small Boat No. C–13546. She was delivered at Norfolk, Virginia, to War Shipping Administration (WSA) and sold to her former owner 20 April 1945. She was struck from the Naval Vessel Register 29 July 1947.
