= USS Prestige =

USS Prestige is a name used more than once by the United States Navy:

- USS Prestige (AMc-97), a coastal minesweeper placed in service 23 December 1941.
- USS Prestige (MSO-465), a fleet minesweeper commissioned 11 September 1954.
