= USS Poughkeepsie =

USS Poughkeepsie may refer to the following ships of the United States Navy:

- USS Poughkeepsie (PF-26), a Tacoma-class frigate, serving from 1943 to 1945; then transferred to the Soviet Navy
- Poughkeepsie (YTB-813) was a Natick-class tugboat serving from 1971 to 2006
