= USS Pennsylvania R. R. No. 9 =

Minesweeper of the United States Navy

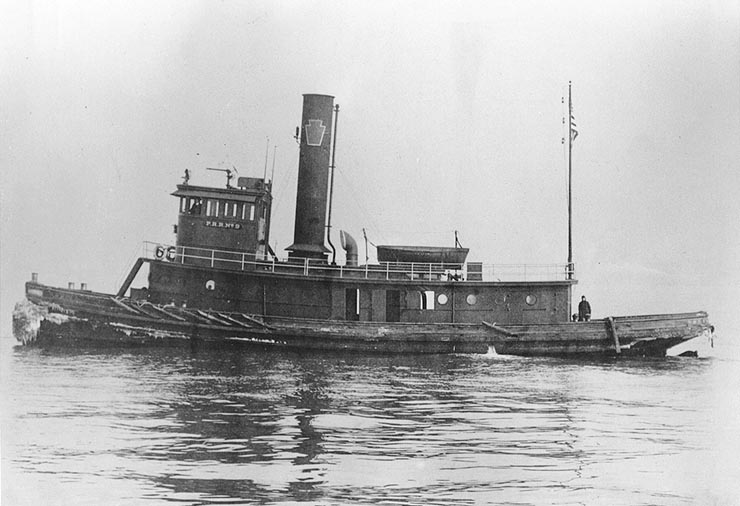
- Pennsylvania R. R. No. 9, also known as Penn R. R. No. 9 and P.R.R. No. 9, as a commercial tug sometime between 1904 and 1917.

History

United States
- Name: USS Pennsylvania R. R. No. 9, also USS Penn R. R. No. 9 and USS P.R.R. No. 9
- Namesake: Previous name retained
- Builder: William R. Trigg, Richmond, Virginia
- Completed: 1904
- Acquired: 18 September 1917
- Commissioned: 22 September 1917
- Fate: Returned to owner 2 January 1919
- Notes: Operated as commercial tug Pennsylvania R. R. No. 9, Penn R. R. No. 9, and P.R.R. No. 9 1904-1917 and from 1919

General characteristics
- Type: Tug and minesweeper
- Displacement: 223 tons
- Length: 92 ft (28 m)
- Beam: 22 ft (6.7 m)
- Draft: 13 ft (4.0 m)
- Speed: 10 knots
- Complement: 19
- Armament: 2 × 1-pounder guns

USS Pennsylvania R. R. No. 9 (SP-679), also known as USS Penn R. R. No. 9 (SP-679) and USS P.R.R. No. 9 (SP-679), was a United States Navy armed tug and minesweeper in commission from 1917 to 1919.

Pennsylvania R. R. No. 9 was built as a commercial tug of the same name by William R. Trigg at Richmond, Virginia, in 1904. She also was listed as Penn R. R. No. 9 and P.R.R. No. 9. In September 1917, the U.S. Navy acquired her from her owner, the Pennsylvania Railroad, for use during World War I. Delivered to the Navy on 18 September 1917 and assigned the section patrol number 679, she was commissioned on 22 September 1917 as USS Pennsylvania R. R. No. 9 (SP-679), being listed also as USS Penn R. R. No. 9 and USS P.R.R. No. 9.

After fitting out, Pennsylvania R. R. No. 9 took up tug and minesweeping duties in New York Harbor for the rest of World War I and for several weeks after its conclusion.

Pennsylvania R. R. No. 9 was returned to the Pennsylvania Railroad on 2 January 1919, having remained active in naval service until that day.
