= USS Panther =

Two vessels of the United States Navy have been named USS Panther.

- The first USS Panther (1889) was the former Austin, an auxiliary cruiser. It was redesignated AD-6.
- The second USS Panther (IX-105) was the former submarine chaser USS SC-1470.
