= USS Peony =

Gunboat of the United States Navy

History

United States
- Acquired: 7 December 1864
- Decommissioned: 1865
- Fate: Sold, 1865

General characteristics
- Displacement: 180 tons
- Length: 104 ft 6 in (31.85 m)
- Beam: 20 ft 6 in (6.25 m)
- Draft: 8 ft 6 in (2.59 m)
- Propulsion: steam engine; screw-propelled
- Speed: 9 knots (17 km/h; 10 mph)
- Armament: one 24-pounder gun

USS Peony was a steamer acquired by the Union Navy during the final months of the American Civil War.

She served the Union Navy's struggle against the Confederate States of America as a gunboat, patrolling the ports and waterways of the Confederate States of America.

== Service history ==
Peony, formerly the wooden steamer Republic, was purchased for the Union Navy by Comdr. C.K. Stribling 7 December 1864 from Bishop & Sons, Philadelphia, Pennsylvania. In January 1865 Peony, Acting Ensign John W. Bennett in command, participated in the capture of Fort Fisher on the Cape Fear River in North Carolina. This fort, located on the narrow tongue of land at the entrance to the Cape Fear River, was a necessary first objective in the plan to close Wilmington, North Carolina, the only remaining seaport from which blockade running could be conducted regularly with reasonable prospects of success. Peony was one of the more than fifty vessels assembled by Admiral David Dixon Porter for this campaign, which culminated with the surrender of the Confederate forces 15 January 1865. The remainder of Peony's wartime service was spent in the North Carolina Sounds carrying out operations as Confederate resistance ceased. She sailed north in July, decommissioned, and was sold at auction in Boston, Massachusetts, to S. & J.M. Flanagan.

== See also ==
- Union Blockade
