= RV Pacific Escort I =

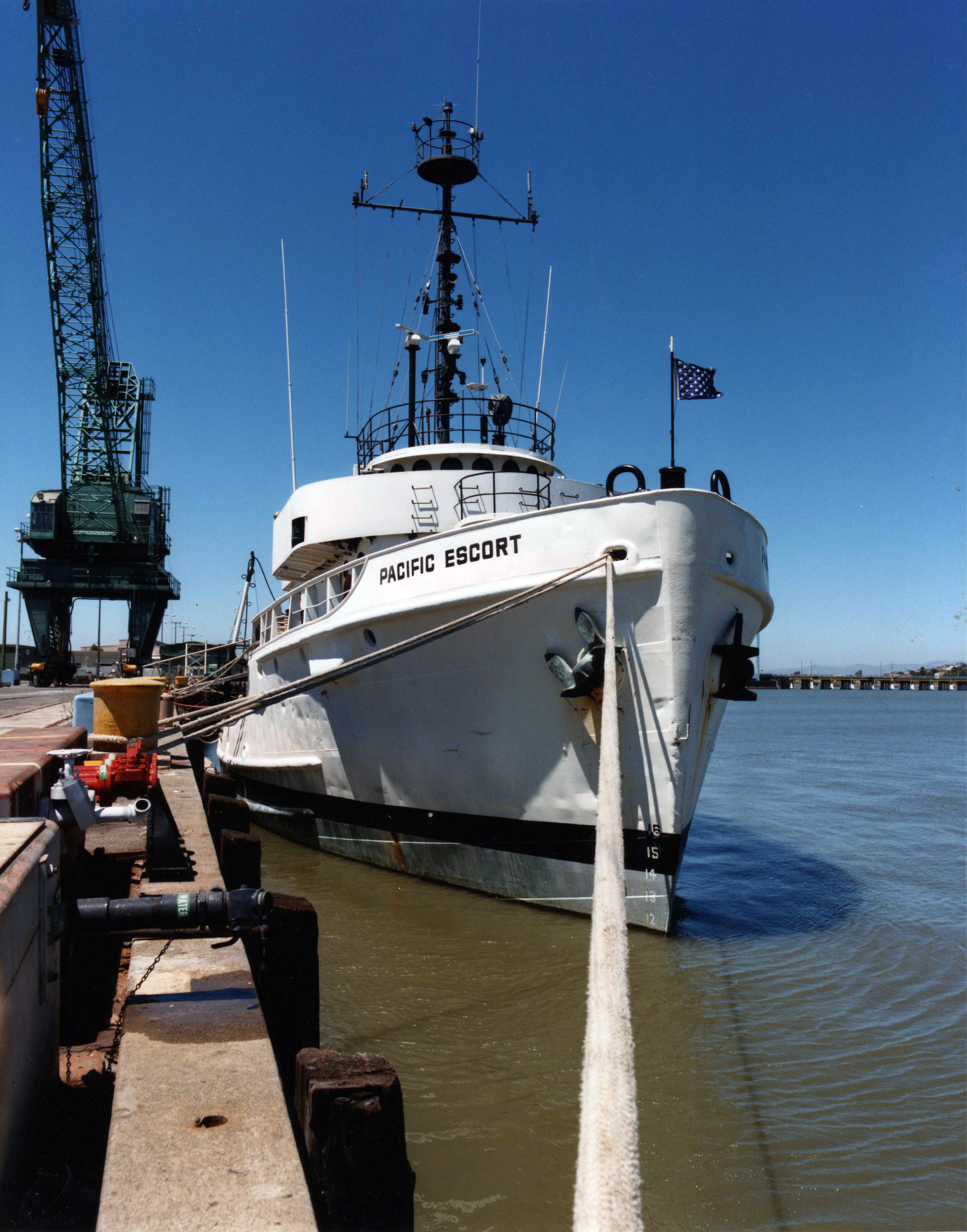

History

United States
- Name: RV Pacific Escort I
- Builder: Levingston Shipbuilding, Orange, Texas
- Laid down: date unknown
- Completed: for the U.S. Army in 1944, in service as LT-535, and in service from 1945 to 1984
- Acquired: by the U.S. Navy in 1985
- In service: 1985
- Out of service: date unknown
- Stricken: date unknown
- Identification: IMO number: 8936906; MMSI number: 657426000; Callsign: 5NQR3
- Fate: Sold commercial by Navy, Ataboy(IMO 8936906), Brittania U III

General characteristics
- Type: U.S. Army Design 377-A large tug
- Tonnage: 505 gt
- Length: 143 ft 5 in (43.71 m)
- Beam: 33 ft (10 m)
- Draft: 14 ft (4.3 m)
- Propulsion: two diesel engines, single shaft, 1,530shp
- Speed: 11.5 knots
- Complement: unknown
- Armament: none

RV Pacific Escort I – previously the U.S. Army LT-535 – was an Army tugboat acquired by the U.S. Navy in 1985 as an escort for submarines and as a for-hire oceanographic research ship at the Mare Island Naval Shipyard.

== Construction ==
LT 535 was a Large Tug (LT), Design 377-A, 505 gross ton, vessel built as hull #331 by Levingston Shipbuilding of Orange, Texas for the U.S. Army Transportation Corps during 1943-1944. She was delivered to the Army April 26, 1944 and placed in service as the U.S. Army LT-535.

== Service career ==
LT-535 had been in service with the U.S. Army from 1945 to 1984 when she was acquired and placed in service with the U.S. Navy in 1985, performing her duties with the Navy until finally struck at an unknown date and disposed of.

== U.S. Navy career ==
When acquired by the U.S. Navy in 1985, she was renamed Pacific Escort was placed into service as an escort for American submarines. She was based at the Mare Island Naval Shipyard, in California, and was available for lease to commercial interests as a general research ship.

== Inactivation ==
Pacific Escort was struck from the Navy List at an unknown date and sold commercial as Ataboy (IMO 8936906). She is believed to be still in commercial service as Brittania U III in Nigeria.

== See also ==
- ShipSpotting.com Pacific Escort
- List of ships of the United States Army
