= USNS Paul Buck =

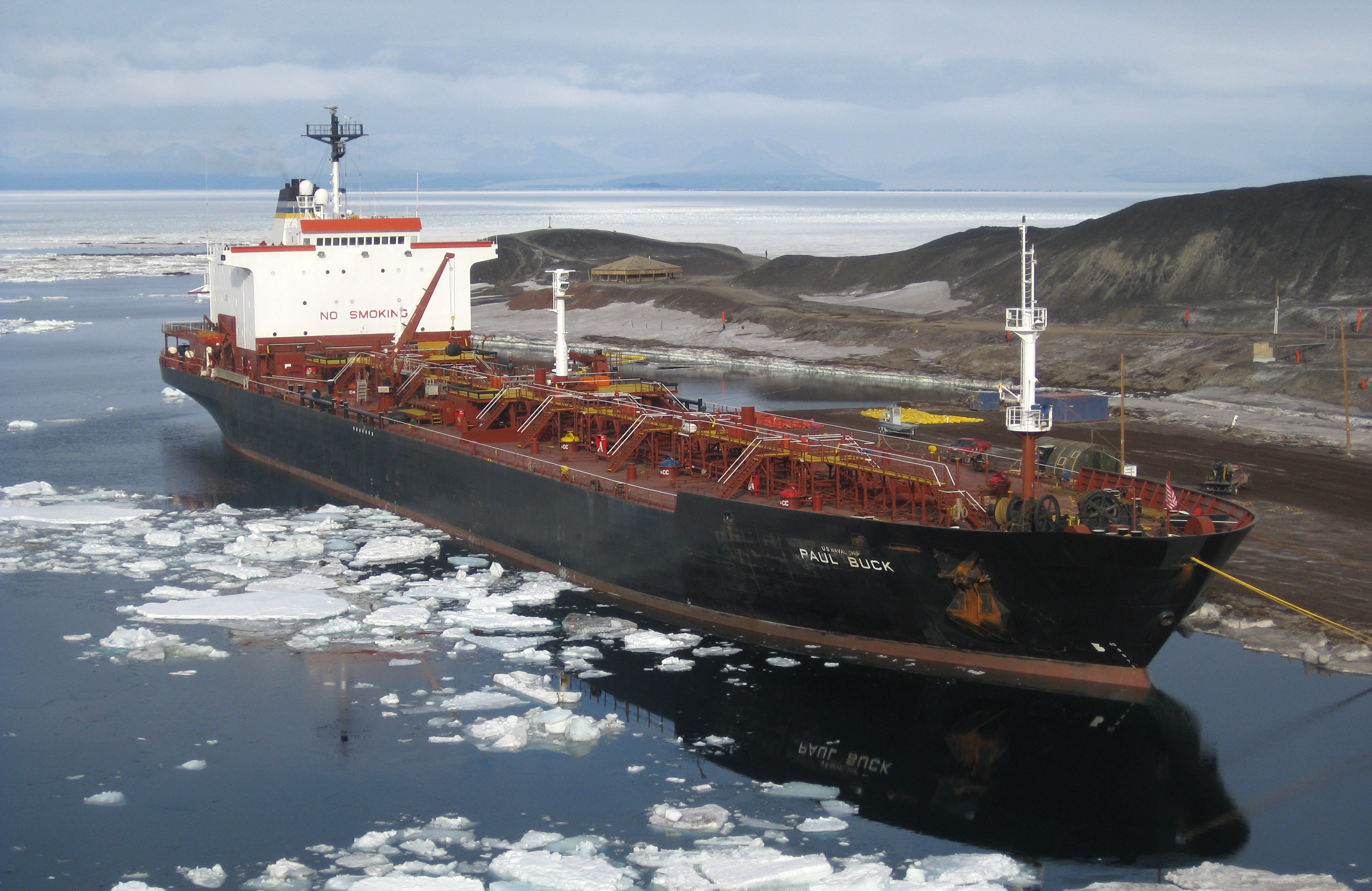
- Paul Buck moored at Antarctica

History

United States
- Name: USNS Paul Buck
- Builder: American Ship Building Company, Tampa, Florida
- Yard number: 1122
- Laid down: 1985
- Launched: 7 July 1985
- Completed: as Ocean Champion
- Acquired: by US Navy 11 September 1985
- In service: 11 September 1985
- Out of service: 30 June 2010
- Stricken: 30 June 2010
- Identification: IMO number: 8220773; MMSI number: 338950000; Callsign: NBBO
- Fate: Scrapped 2024

General characteristics
- Class & type: Oil Products Tanker Champion Class T-5 Tanker
- Displacement: 21,470 tons full 39624 tons
- Length: 615
- Beam: 90 ft (27 m)
- Draft: 24 ft 8 in (7.52 m)
- Installed power: Sulzer 5RTA76 diesel (18,400 hp sustained)
- Propulsion: Single shaft
- Speed: 16 knots (30 km/h; 18 mph)
- Capacity: 237,766 bbls
- Complement: 24 Civilians
- Armament: unarmed
- Aircraft carried: none

USNS Paul Buck (T-AOT-1122), a transport oiler ship, was originally constructed in 1985 by American Ship Building Company, Tampa, Florida for Ocean Product Tankers of Houston for a long-term charter to the United States Navy and operated by Military Sealift Command. The ship was delivered on 7 July 1985. It is a T-5 Tanker. The ship was named after Merchant Marine Paul Buck, who was awarded the Merchant Marine Distinguished Service Medal. On the morning of February 2, 2024 it was observed being towed through the Brazos Santiago Pass at South Padre Island, heading for recycling at International Shipbreaking in Brownsville (Tx). She arrived there February 24, 2024.

== Antarctic missions ==
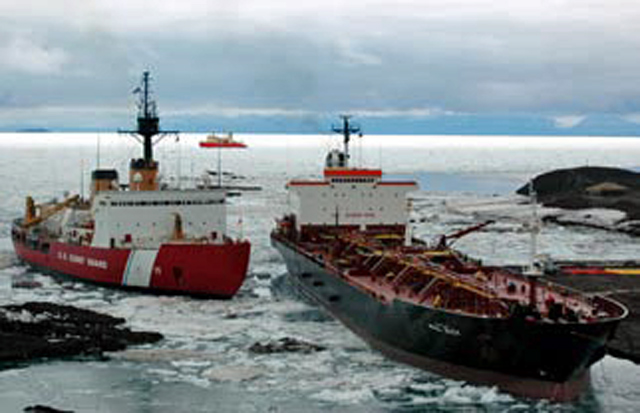
The Paul Buck harbored next to an Ice breaker in Winter Quarters Bay

Paul Buck made frequent deliveries of fuel to the Antarctic for resupply. This was the most common route that this ship made delivering a variety of fuel types to the base, always escorted by an ice breaker.

In 2010 the vessel was replaced by Empire State and Paul Buck was taken out of service and transferred to the Maritime Commission's National Defense Reserve Fleet. The vessel was laid up in "Interim Hold" as of April 2020.
