= USS Proteus (1863) =

Gunboat of the United States Navy

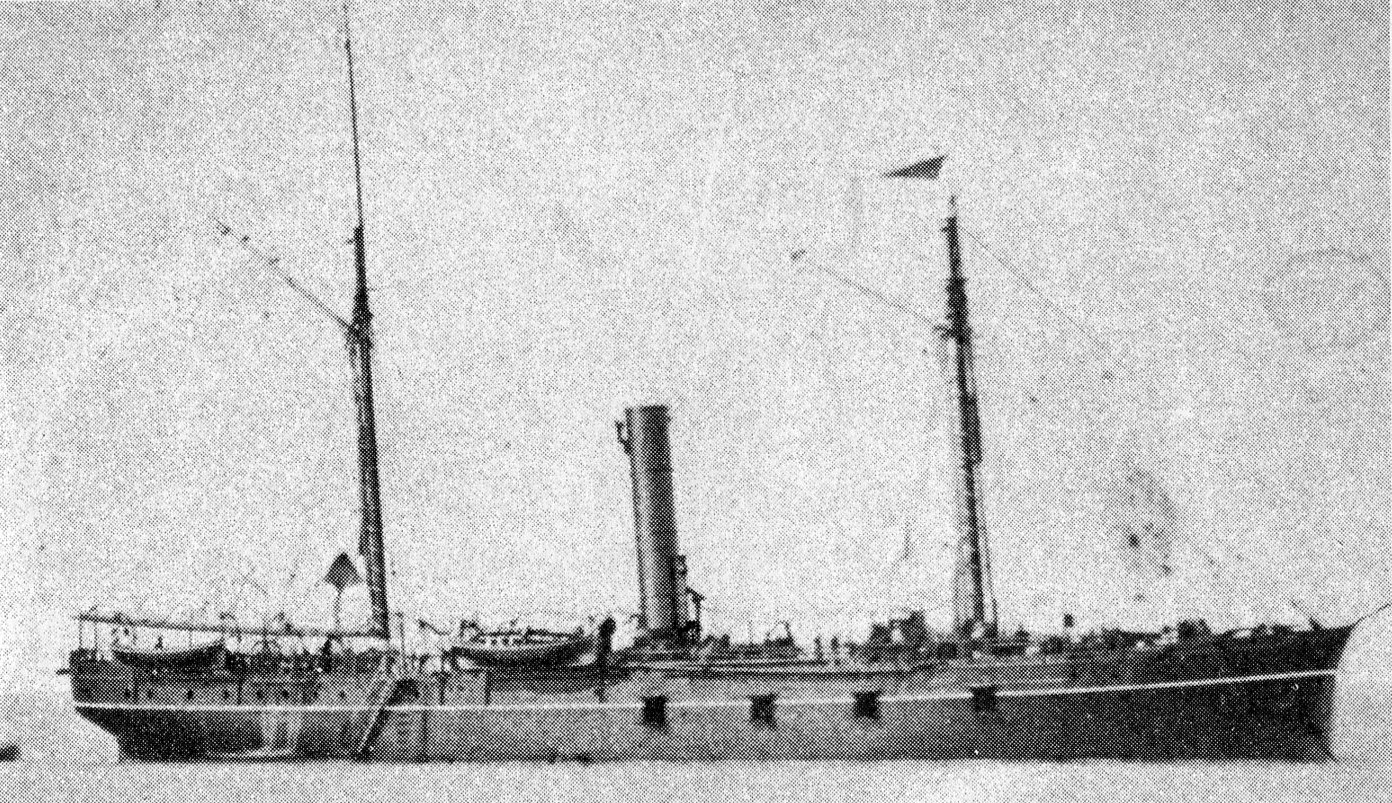
- USS Proteus in active service

History

United States
- Name: Proteus
- Launched: About late March 1863
- Acquired: 5 October 1863
- Commissioned: 10 March 1864
- Decommissioned: circa March 1865
- Stricken: 1865 (est.)
- Fate: Sold, 12 July 1865

General characteristics
- Tonnage: 1,244
- Length: 203 ft (62 m)
- Beam: 36 ft (11 m)
- Draft: 13 ft 9 in (4.19 m)
- Depth of hold: 20 ft 8 in (6.30 m)
- Propulsion: steam engine; screw-propelled
- Speed: 11 knots
- Complement: not known
- Armament: one 100-pounder Parrott rifle; two 30-pounder Parrott rifles; six 32-pounder cannons; two 12-pounder rifled guns

USS Proteus was a steamer armed with powerful ordnance, commissioned by the Union Navy during the American Civil War.

Proteus served during the blockade of ports and waterways of the Confederate States of America as a gunboat, patrolling primarily the waters off the coast of Florida.

== Service history ==
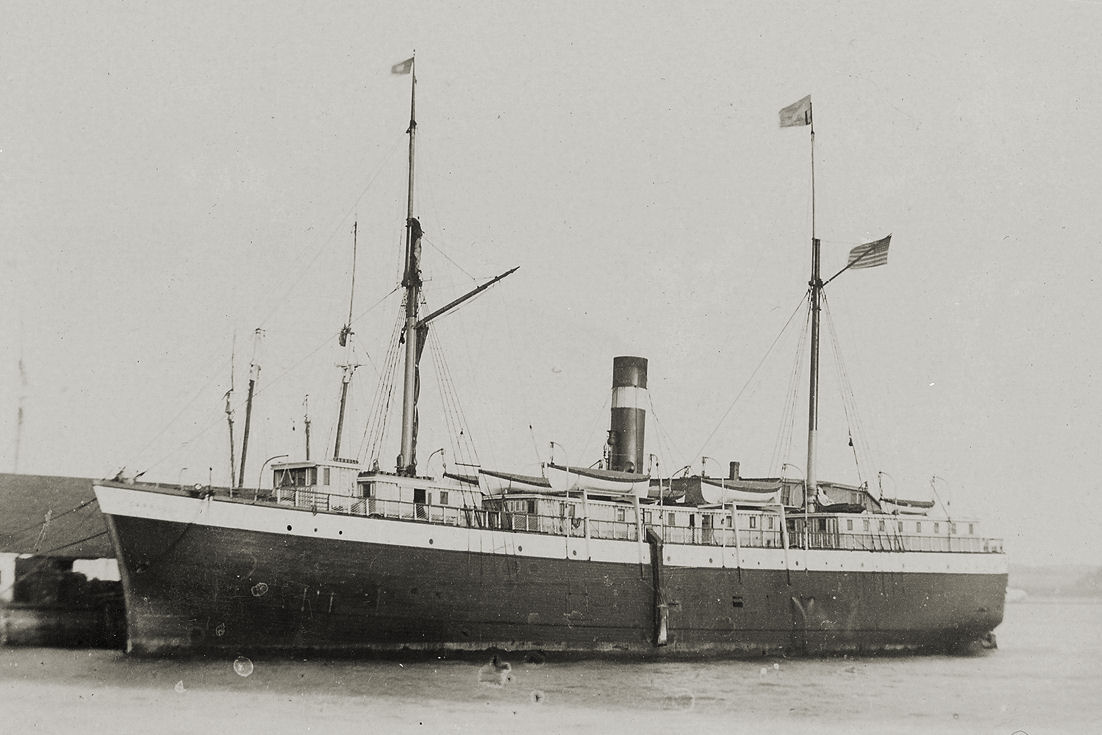
Carroll in Charlottetown

Proteus, a wooden screw steamer, was purchased from William P. Williams at New York City, on 5 October 1863. She was commissioned on 10 March 1864, with Commander Robert W. Shufeldt in command.

Sailing south from New York City 11 April, Proteus arrived at Key West, Florida on 22 April. On 14 May she got underway for Cuba, where she watched for blockade runners bound for Wilmington, North Carolina from the Windwards. Back at Key West 24 May, she headed for the Bahama Banks to intercept traffic from Nassau, Bahamas. On 9 June she captured the British schooner R. S. Hood, and on 27 June the Jupiter out of London. In early September she captured Ann Louisa out of Havana, Cuba, and on 27 February 1865, the steamer Ruby, also out of Havana.

On 4 March 1865 Proteus arrived off the St. Marks River, Florida, to support Union forces attempting to capture Tallahassee, Florida. Shallow water prevented the naval force from following the troops up the river and without their support the Union Army was forced to fall back. Union troops secured the mouth of the river, however, to prevent Tallahassee's further use as a port by the South.

Proteus returned to Key West on 12 March, and on the 21st headed north to New York City. Arriving there on 12 July 1865, after the war's end, she was sold at public auction to the firm of Hooper and Co. and entered commercial service under the name Carroll. After a short and unsuccessful transatlantic career, Carroll was sold again and placed in service between Boston, Massachusetts, and Canada. She remained in this service until being broken up at Boston in 1894.

== See also ==
- Union Blockade
