= USS Pawnee (SP-699) =

Patrol vessel of the United States Navy

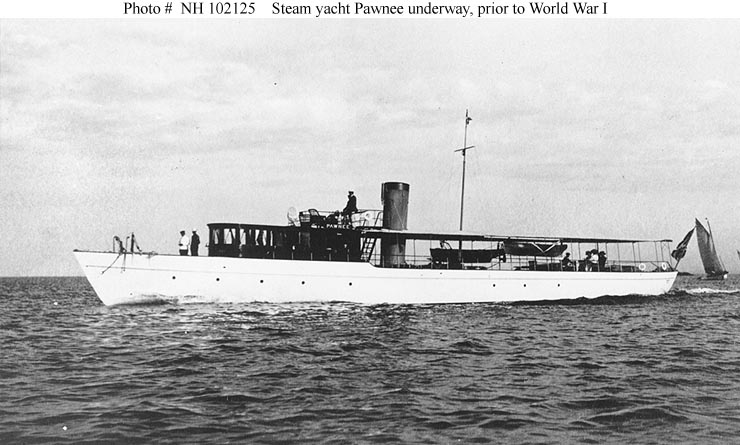

History

United States
- Name: USS Pawnee
- Builder: George Lawley & Son, Neponset, Massachusetts
- Launched: 1904
- Acquired: 26 June 1917
- Commissioned: 1 July 1917
- Fate: Sold, 12 July 1921

General characteristics
- Type: Patrol boat / minesweeper
- Displacement: 75 long tons (76 t)
- Length: 114 ft (35 m)
- Beam: 14 ft (4.3 m)
- Draft: 6 ft 3 in (1.91 m)
- Speed: 13 knots (24 km/h; 15 mph)
- Complement: 21
- Armament: 1 × 3-pounder gun; 2 × machine guns

USS Pawnee (SP-699), later USS SP-699, formerly named Monoloa II, a wooden-hulled yacht, was built in 1904 by George Lawley & Son, Neponset, Massachusetts; purchased by the Navy on 26 June 1917 from Gordon Dexter of Beverly, Massachusetts; and commissioned on 1 July 1917.

Pawnee subsequently had her name dropped in 1918 and was listed as SP–699. She was outfitted with sweep gear and served as a section minesweeper until she decommissioned and was sold on 12 July 1921 to George E. Johnson and O. T. Ledberg of Edgewood, Rhode Island.
