= USS Ponce (SP-364) =

Patrol vessel of the United States Navy

History

United States
- Name: USS Ponce
- In service: ?-1917
- Out of service: 1917
- Stricken: 1917

General characteristics
- Type: Motorboat
- Tonnage: 18 tons

USS Ponce (SP-364) was an 18-ton motorboat in the service of the United States Navy during World War I. She was returned or sold from service on December 19, 1917.
