= USS Pearl (SP-1219) =

U.S. Navy patrol vessel

History

United States
- Name: USS Pearl
- Namesake: Previous name retained
- Builder: W. H. Saunders
- Completed: 1912
- Acquired: 23 August 1917
- Commissioned: 1917
- Fate: Returned to owners 23 December 1918
- Notes: Operated as private motorboat Pearl 1912-1917 and from 1918

General characteristics
- Type: Patrol vessel
- Length: 45 ft (14 m)
- Beam: 9 ft (2.7 m)
- Draft: 2 ft (0.61 m)
- Speed: 12 knots
- Complement: 7

USS Pearl (SP-1219) was a United States Navy patrol vessel in commission from 1917 to 1918.

Pearl was built as a private motorboat of the same name in 1912 by W. H. Saunders. On 23 August 1917, the U.S. Navy acquired her from her owner for use as a section patrol boat during World War I. She was commissioned as USS Pearl (SP-1219) and assigned to "special duty." Pearl was returned to her owner on 23 December 1918.
