= USS Pinola (AT-33) =

Tugboat of the United States Navy

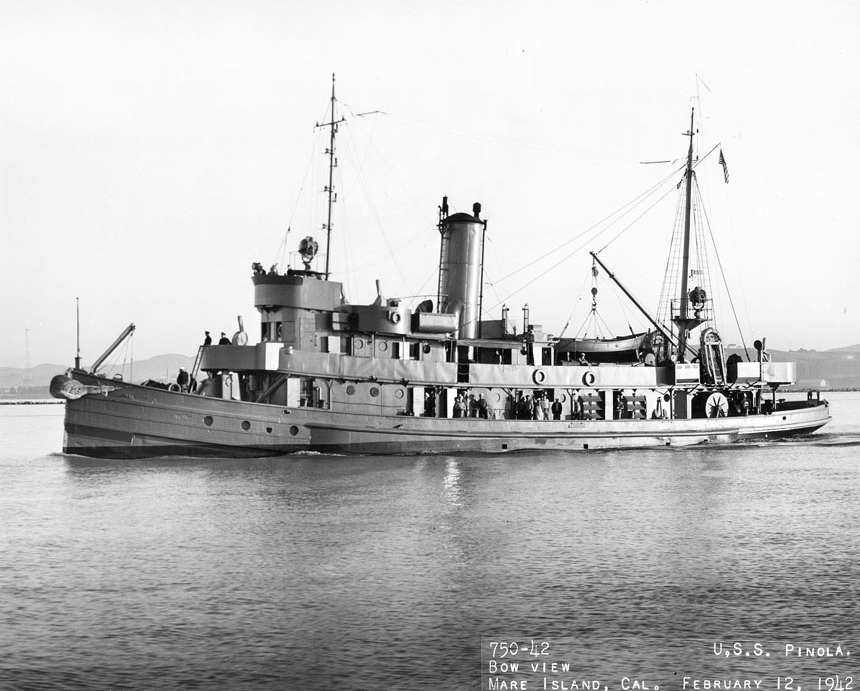
- Pinola near Mare Island Naval Shipyard, 12 February 1942

History

United States
- Name: Pinola
- Laid down: 3 March 1919
- Launched: 12 August 1919
- Commissioned: 7 February 1920
- Decommissioned: 31 January 1946
- Stricken: 26 February 1946
- Fate: Most likely scrapped

General characteristics
- Class & type: Bagaduce Class Fleet Tug
- Displacement: 1,000 tonnes (980 long tons; 1,100 short tons)
- Length: 156 ft 8 in (47.75 m)
- Beam: 30 ft (9.1 m)
- Draft: 14 ft 7 in (4.45 m)
- Speed: 13 knots (24 km/h; 15 mph)
- Armament: 1 machine gun
- Notes: formerly Nipsic

The USS Pinola (AT–33) was a Bagaduce-class fleet tug, laid down on 3 March 1919 by Puget Sound Navy Yard in Bremerton, Washington, launched on the 12 August 1919, and was commissioned on 7 February 1920.

== Pacific Fleet service ==
The Pinola was assigned to the Pacific Fleet and operated on the West Coast near San Francisco until decommissioning at Mare Island on 9 June 1922. The ship was recommissioned on 14 August 1923 and resumed service in ports of the California coast, principally San Diego where she served during the years between the wars.

== Second World War ==
After Japan's attack on Pearl Harbor brought the United States into World War II, Pinola continued operations on the West Coast through most of the war providing tug services to the Navy's fighting ships in the Pacific. The ship was redesignated ATO–30 on 15 May 1944 and served in Alaskan waters during the closing months of the war.

== Post War service ==
Returning to the northwest Pacific coast in the fall of 1945, Pinola served in the 13th Naval District operating out of Seattle supporting Operation Magic Carpet until decommissioning 31 January 1946. Struck from the Naval Vessel Register 26 February 1946, she was transferred to the Maritime Commission 21 July 1947 for simultaneous sale to Oakland Manufacturing Company.
