= USS Patchogue (YFB-1227) =

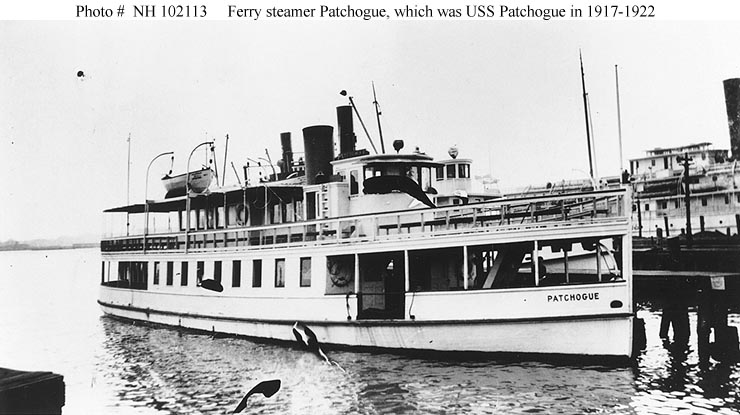
- Patchogue in commercial service sometime between 1912 and 1917.

History

United States
- Name: USS Patchogue
- Namesake: Previous name retained
- Builder: Robert Jacobs, City Island, the Bronx, New York
- Completed: 1912
- Acquired: 29 September 1917
- In service: 1917
- Out of service: 1922
- Reclassified: From ID-1227 to "ferryboat" (YFB-1227) 17 July 1920
- Fate: Sold 16 June 1922
- Notes: Operated as commercial ferryboat Patchogue 1912–1917

General characteristics
- Type: Ferry
- Tonnage: 135 Gross register tons
- Length: 99 ft 9 in (30.40 m)
- Beam: 23 ft 3 in (7.09 m)
- Draft: 3 ft (0.91 m)
- Propulsion: Steam engine
- Speed: 11 knots

The first USS Patchogue (ID-1227), later YFB-1227, was a United States Navy ferry in service from 1917 to 1922.

Patchogue was built in 1912 as a commercial wooden-hulled steam ferry of the same name by Robert Jacobs at City Island in the Bronx, New York. In 1917, the U.S. Navy purchased her from the Boston, Nahant and Pines Steamship Company for use during World War I. Delivered to the Navy on 29 September 1917 and assigned the naval registry identification number 1227, she entered service as USS Patchogue (ID-1227).

Assigned to the 3rd Naval District, Patchogue operated as a ferry at Submarine Base New London in New London, Connecticut. When the U.S. Navy adopted its modern hull number system on 17 July 1920, Patchogue was classified as a "ferryboat" (YFB) and redesignated YFB-1227. In June 1921, she was transferred to the 4th Naval District for service in the Delaware River-Delaware Bay area.

Placed out of service in 1922, Patchogue was sold to Charles Carr of Keansburg, New Jersey, on 16 June 1922.

== Bibliography ==
- Department of the Navy Naval History and Heritage Command Online Library of Selected Images: Civilian Ships: Patchogue (American Steam Ferryboat, 1912). Served as USS Patchogue (ID # 1227, later YFB-1227) in 1917–1922
- Photo gallery of USS Patchogue (YFB-1227) at NavSource Naval History
