= USS Pontiac (ID-2343) =

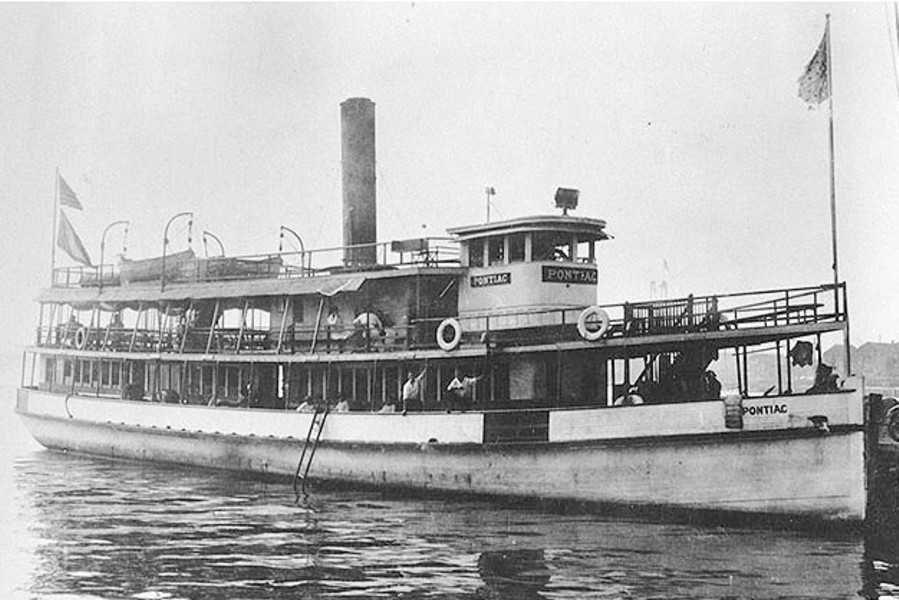
- Pontiac photographed prior to her World War I Navy service.

History

United States
- Name: USS Pontiac
- Namesake: Chief Pontiac
- Christened: as Pioneer
- Completed: 1883
- Acquired: chartered by the US Navy 4 March 1918
- In service: March 1918
- Out of service: July 1918
- Refit: 1909
- Stricken: est. July 1918
- Fate: returned to owner 1918

General characteristics
- Type: ferryboat
- Tonnage: 112 gross tons
- Length: 114 ft (35 m)
- Beam: 22 ft 2 in (6.76 m)
- Draft: 4 ft 6 in (1.37 m)
- Speed: 8 kn (15 km/h; 9.2 mph)

USS Pontiac (ID 2343) was a commercial ferryboat twice chartered by the U.S. Navy during World War I. After acquiring the ferry from the Pawtucket Steamboat Co, the Navy was not able to find an adequate use for the vessel, such as a minesweeper, and returned it, finally, to its owner.

== Built in Rhode Island ==
Pontiac, a 112 gross ton steam ferryboat built at East Providence, Rhode Island, in 1883 and rebuilt there in 1909, was previously named Pioneer.

== World War I service ==
She was chartered by the Navy in March 1918 and briefly was USS Pontiac (ID 2343). However, a planned conversion to a minesweeper was not carried out and she was returned to her owner in June 1918. Again taken over soon after that, she was given back to her owner for a final time in July 1918.
