= USS Patriot (1861) =

Cargo ship of the United States Navy

History

United States
- Acquired: 13 August 1861
- In service: circa 1861
- Out of service: circa 1865

General characteristics
- Propulsion: schooner sail

USS Patriot was a schooner acquired by the Union Navy during the American Civil War.

The Navy planned to use her as part of the stone fleet of obstructions at the ports of the Confederate States of America, but decided instead to use her as a storeship.

== Service history ==
Patriot, a wooden schooner, was purchased by the Navy at Baltimore, Maryland, 13 August 1861 to be sunk to block the channel leading into the Carolina Sounds at Hatteras Inlet. However, a rough surf, the poor condition of the ship, and Confederate Naval defenses forced postponement of this project until it was obviated by Flag Officer Silas Stringham’s victory at the Battle of Hatteras Inlet Batteries at the end of August. Patriot served as a storeship at Hampton Roads, Virginia, before disappearing from Naval and Maritime records.
