= USS Parrakeet (AMc-34) =

Minesweeper of the United States Navy

History

United States
- Ordered: as Jackie Sue
- Laid down: 1934
- Launched: 1934
- Acquired: 14 November 1940
- In service: 29 April 1941
- Out of service: date unknown
- Stricken: 22 December 1944
- Fate: Ordered disposed, 5 February 1945

General characteristics
- Displacement: 197 tons
- Length: 79 ft 3 in (24.16 m)
- Beam: 20 ft 8 in (6.30 m)
- Draught: 8 ft 6 in (2.59 m)
- Speed: 9.0 knots
- Complement: 15
- Armament: two .50 cal (12.7 mm) machine guns

USS Parrakeet (AMc-34) was a coastal minesweeper acquired by the U.S. Navy for the dangerous task of removing mines from minefields laid in the water to prevent ships from passing.

The first ship to be named Parrakeet by the Navy, AMc–34 was built in 1934 by Al Larson, Terminal Island, California, as the Jackie Sue; acquired by the Navy 14 November 1940; and placed in service 29 April 1941.

== World War II service ==
Parrakeet was assigned to harbor and coastal service along the California coast.

== Deactivation ==
Parrakeet was struck from the Naval Register 22 December 1944 and transferred to the War Shipping Administration for disposal 5 February 1945.
