= USS Pirate (SP-229) =

Patrol vessel of the United States Navy

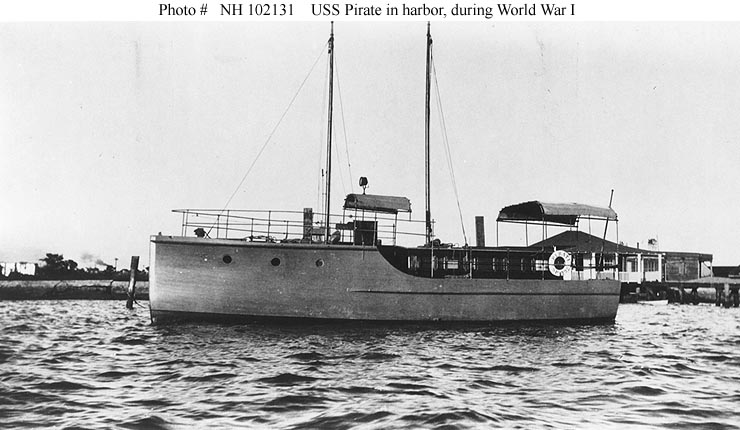
- USS Pirate during World War I.

History

United States
- Name: USS Pirate
- Namesake: A pirate, a person who commits piracy, a war-like act committed by private parties, especially robbery or other acts of criminal violence on the sea (Previous name retained)
- Builder: A. Craven Construction Company, Charleston, South Carolina
- Completed: 1916
- Acquired: 5 September 1917
- Commissioned: 5 September 1917
- Fate: Returned to owner 26 December 1918
- Notes: Operated as civilian motorboat Pirate 1916-1917 and from December 1918

General characteristics
- Type: Patrol vessel
- Length: 42 ft 5 in (12.93 m)
- Beam: 11 ft 6 in (3.51 m)
- Draft: 2 ft 11 in (0.89 m) mean
- Complement: 8
- Armament: 1 × 1-pounder gun; 1 × machine gun

The first USS Pirate (SP-229) was a United States Navy patrol vessel in commission from 1917 to 1918.

Pirate was built as a civilian motorboat of the same name in 1916 by the A. Craven Construction Company at Charleston, South Carolina. The U.S. Navy chartered her from her owner, A. Halsey, on 5 September 1917 for World War I service as a patrol vessel. She was commissioned the same day as USS Pirate (SP-229).

Pirate patrolled along the United States East Coast for the remainder of World War I.

Pirate was returned to her owner on 26 December 1918.
