= List of shipwrecks in 1956 =

The list of shipwrecks in 1956 includes ships sunk, foundered, grounded, or otherwise lost during 1956.

table of contents
1956
Jan	Feb	Mar	Apr
May	Jun	Jul	Aug
Sep	Oct	Nov	Dec

== January ==
=== 2 January ===
List of shipwrecks: 2 January 1956
Ship	State	Description
Citrine	United Kingdom	The collier sank off The Lizard, Cornwall. All ten crew were rescued, but one later died.
Melody	Liberia	The tanker ran aground at Vlissingen, Netherlands.

=== 5 January ===
List of shipwrecks: 5 January 1956
Ship	State	Description
Gem	United Kingdom	The cargo ship collided with Kallgeir (Norway) at Poortershaven, Netherlands and was beached.
Hartel	Netherlands	The coaster collided with Penhir (France) in the River Thames at Gravesend, Kent. All nine on board rescued.

=== 6 January ===
List of shipwrecks: 6 January 1956
Ship	State	Description
Esso Appalachee	United Kingdom	The tanker collided with the jetty at Immingham, Lincolnshire, cutting it in two and leaving a 50-foot (15 m) gap.

=== 7 January ===
List of shipwrecks: 7 January 1956
Ship	State	Description
Alvi	Panama	The cargo ship struck a mine and sank in the North Sea west of Hvide Sande, Denmark, at 55°57′N 6°52′E.

=== 8 January ===
List of shipwrecks: 8 January 1956
Ship	State	Description
Moreton Bay	United Kingdom	The ocean liner ran aground in the Suez Canal. Later refloated.

=== 10 January ===
List of shipwrecks: 10 January 1956
Ship	State	Description
Sirabuen	Norway	The coaster collided with Loide Venezuela (Brazil) and sank 15 nautical miles (28 km) of Kijkduin, Netherlands with the loss of all but one of her eight crew.

=== 12 January ===
List of shipwrecks: 12 January 1956
Ship	State	Description
Anabel II	United States	The 58.9-foot (18.0 m), 62-gross register ton tug was destroyed by fire while moored for the winter at Sturgeon Bay, Wisconsin, at 44°49.759′N 087°22.821′W.

=== 17 January ===
List of shipwrecks: 17 January 1956
Ship	State	Description
Salem Maritime	United States	The T2 tanker exploded, caught fire and sank at Lake Charles, Louisiana. She was refloated on 29 January. Although declared a constructive total loss, she was later rebuilt and returned to service.

=== 21 January ===
List of shipwrecks: 21 January 1956
Ship	State	Description
Maria Pompei	Italy	The cargo ship ran aground at Aberavon, Glamorgan.

=== 23 January ===
List of shipwrecks: 23 January 1956
Ship	State	Description
Baltrover	United Kingdom	The cargo ship ran aground at the mouth of the Elbe, West Germany. Refloated on 13 February.

=== 29 January ===
List of shipwrecks: 29 January 1956
Ship	State	Description
Gertrud	West Germany	The cargo ship sank in the North Sea 150 nautical miles (280 km) east of Peterhead, Aberdeenshire, Scotland. All nine crew rescued by the trawlers Junella and York City (both United Kingdom) and landed at Aberdeen.

=== 22 January ===
List of shipwrecks: 22 January 1956
Ship	State	Description
Bedford	United Kingdom	The tanker ran aground off Singapore. Refloated after 36 hours.

=== Unknown date ===
List of shipwrecks: Unknown date 1956
Ship	State	Description
King's Mount	United Kingdom	The cargo ship ran aground in the Elbe, West Germany. Refloated on 1 February having been aground for several days.

== February ==
=== 2 February ===
List of shipwrecks: 2 February 1956
Ship	State	Description
Micaela	Venezuela	The 148.3-foot (45.2 m), 428-ton cargo vessel was lost in a storm off Puerto Colombia, Colombia.

=== 3 February ===
List of shipwrecks: 3 February 1956
Ship	State	Description
Dovrefjell	Norway	The cargo ship ran aground on the Pentland Skerries, Orkney Islands, Scotland. All 41 crew were rescued by Royal Air Force and Royal Navy helicopters.
Rosalind	Panama	The cargo ship sank 120 nautical miles (220 km) south of Crete (33°21′N 27°50′E). All crew rescued by San Carlo (Italy). Rosalind was on a voyage from Split, Yugoslavia to Dammam, Saudi Arabia.

=== 4 February ===
List of shipwrecks: 4 February 1956
Ship	State	Description
Kronprinsesse Ingrid	Denmark	The passenger ship ran aground off Esbjerg. Refloated the next day.

=== 8 February ===
List of shipwrecks: 8 February 1956
Ship	State	Description
Chua Guan	Crown Colony of Singapore	The 23-ton ship sank 2 miles (3.2 km) from Palau Samboe in rough seas. Hai Guan (Crown Colony of Singapore) rescued the crew.
Lycia	United Kingdom	The cargo ship ran aground off Katakolon, Greece.

=== 10 February ===
List of shipwrecks: 10 February 1956
Ship	State	Description
Conlea	United Kingdom	The cargo ship foundered 15 nautical miles (28 km) off La Corbière, Jersey. She was on a voyage from Southampton, Hampshire to Saint-Malo, Ille-et-Vilaine, France.
Loide-Honduras, and Rumania	Brazil; United Kingdom	The cargo ship Loide-Honduras ran aground on Longsand, in the North Sea off the coast of Essex. The Improved Larch-class tug Rumania was sent to assist but she ran aground on the same sandbank and sank (51°43′N 1°37′E). Her crew were rescued by helicopter. Loide-Honduras refloated on 12 February and returned to service.

=== 13 February ===
List of shipwrecks: 13 February 1956
Ship	State	Description
Unnamed ferry	Egypt	The 1956 Egypt ferry accident occurred in the morning on 13 February 1956 near Dekernes at a small tributary of the Nile, in Egypt. A passenger ferry capsized, killing 22 schoolchildren between 12 years old and 18 years old.

=== 14 February ===
List of shipwrecks: 14 February 1956
Ship	State	Description
RFA Wave Monarch	Royal Navy	The Wave-class oiler ran aground at Valletta, Malta. Later refloated.

=== 16 February ===
List of shipwrecks: 16 February 1956
Ship	State	Description
No. 24	United Kingdom	The hopper barge was in collision with Indus (United Kingdom) and sank in the River Mersey. All eleven crew rescued.

=== 18 February ===
List of shipwrecks: 18 February 1956
Ship	State	Description
Carol Joy	United States	The 13-gross register ton, 33.7-foot (10.3 m) fishing vessel was wrecked on the west coast of Admiralty Island in the Alexander Archipelago in Southeast Alaska.
Kaptan Uzunoglu	Turkey	The cargo ship ran aground near Ereğli. She was on a voyage from Istanbul to Zonguldak. She was declared a constructive total loss.

=== 19 February ===
List of shipwrecks: 19 February 1956
Ship	State	Description
Corchester	United Kingdom	The collier was in collision with City of Sydney (United Kingdom) near the Haisborough Lightship ( Trinity House ), off the coast of Norfolk and sank with the loss of eight of her 21 crew.

=== 29 February ===
List of shipwrecks: 29 February 1956
Ship	State	Description
Sapanca	Turkey	The cargo ship collided in the Scheldt, Belgium with Blommersdijk (Netherlands) and sank. All 35 crew saved by Blommersdijk.

== March ==
=== 1 March ===
List of shipwrecks: 1 March 1956
Ship	State	Description
Greenhaven	United Kingdom	The coaster ran aground on Roaninish Rock, 2 nautical miles (3.7 km) off the coast of County Donegal, Ireland, after her engine failed in a storm. Assistance given by HMS Wizard (Royal Navy) and the Arranmore Lifeboat. All ten crew rescued by helicopters from RAF Eglinton.

=== 3 March ===
List of shipwrecks: 3 March 1956
Ship	State	Description
Washington Mail	United States	While on a voyage from Seattle, Washington, to East Asia, the 7,943-ton, 468.5-foot (142.8 m) steamer broke in two and sank in the Gulf of Alaska during a storm. All 57 crewmen and all nine passengers on board survived.

=== 9 March ===
List of shipwrecks: 9 March 1956
Ship	State	Description
Friada	United States	The 6-gross register ton, 27.9-foot (8.5 m) fishing vessel sank off the coast of the Territory of Alaska 2 nautical miles (3.7 km; 2.3 mi) west of "Cape Baranof," possibly a reference to Cape Burunof (56.9839°N 135.3775°W) in Southeast Alaska.

=== 10 March ===
List of shipwrecks: 10 March 1956
Ship	State	Description
Kotzebue	United States	The 69-gross register ton, 60.3-foot (18.4 m) motor cargo vessel was destroyed by ice in Kotzebue Sound on the west coast of the Territory of Alaska.

=== 11 March ===
List of shipwrecks: 11 March 1956
Ship	State	Description
Prince de Liege	Belgium	Caught fire off Spain and abandoned by crew. Towed by a naval tug (Spanish Navy) then by salvage ship Herakles (Sweden) to Gibraltar. Subsequently scrapped in the United Kingdom in 1957.

=== 14 March ===
List of shipwrecks: 14 March 1956
Ship	State	Description
Vert Prairial	France	The trawler was driven ashore at Wireless Point, Porthcurno, Cornwall, United Kingdom with the loss of all seventeen on board.

=== 16 March ===
List of shipwrecks: 16 March 1956
Ship	State	Description
Etrusco	Italy	The 441-foot (134 m) cargo ship was blown ashore during a storm on Cedar Point at Scituate, Massachusetts, United States, directly in front of Old Scituate Light. The United States Coast Guard rescued all 30 members of her crew by breeches buoy. She remained aground for several months, then was refloated, repaired, renamed Scituate, and returned to service.

=== 18 March ===
List of shipwrecks: 18 March 1956
Ship	State	Description
Stalowa Wola	Poland	The 306.4-foot (93.4 m), 3,133-ton cargo vessel sprung a leak northwest of Spain and was abandoned. She capsized and sank 12 hours later on 19 March. The crew was rescued by Hugo Kollataj (Poland).
USS Willis A. Lee	United States Navy	The Mitscher-class destroyer was driven onto rocks at Jamestown, Rhode Island, in a storm.

=== 20 March ===
List of shipwrecks: 20 March 1956
Ship	State	Description
J. H.	United States	The 19-gross register ton, 41.3-foot (12.6 m) fishing vessel sank off Kodiak, Territory of Alaska.

=== 24 March ===
List of shipwrecks: 24 March 1956
Ship	State	Description
E. Kirby Smith	United States	The Liberty ship was run into by the cargo ship Nyland (Sweden) off Norfolk, Virginia and was almost cut it two. She was scrapped later that year.
Sunset	United States	The 7-gross register ton, 30.6-foot (9.3 m) fishing vessel was destroyed by fire at Kodiak, Territory of Alaska.

=== 28 March ===
List of shipwrecks: 28 March 1956
Ship	State	Description
Changsha	United Kingdom	The cargo ship ran aground at Tokyo, Japan. Refloated on 9 April.

== April ==
=== 9 April ===
List of shipwrecks: 9 April 1956
Ship	State	Description
Akka	Sweden	The ore carrier sank in the Firth of Clyde with the loss of six of her 33 crew.

=== 12 April ===
List of shipwrecks: 12 April 1956
Ship	State	Description
Carlisle I	United States	The 35-gross register ton, 56.1-foot (17.1 m) fishing vessel was destroyed by fire at Cordova, Territory of Alaska.

=== 13 April ===
List of shipwrecks: 13 April 1956
Ship	State	Description
Maria Schroeder	West Germany	The cargo ship ran aground in the Red Sea during a sandstorm.

=== 17 April ===
List of shipwrecks: 17 April 1956
Ship	State	Description
Altair	Netherlands	The cargo ship struck a rock off Borborema, Brazil and sank. All crew were rescued.

=== 20 April ===
List of shipwrecks: 20 April 1956
Ship	State	Description
Loyal	United States	The 23-gross register ton, 43.4-foot (13.2 m) fishing vessel was destroyed by fire in Simpson Bay (60°37′30″N 145°55′00″W) in Prince William Sound on the south-central coast of the Territory of Alaska.

=== 27 April ===
List of shipwrecks: 27 April 1956
Ship	State	Description
Luabo	Portugal	The cargo ship sank off Mozambique with the loss of fourteen of her 57 crew.

== May ==
=== 3 May ===
List of shipwrecks: 3 May 1956
Ship	State	Description
Mandasor; National Servant	United Kingdom; Liberia	The cargo ship Mandasor collided with the Liberty tanker National Servant in the Scheldt. Both vessels were severely damaged.

=== 5 May ===
List of shipwrecks: 5 May 1956
Ship	State	Description
Erling Borthen	Norway	The cargo ship collided with Santa Rosa (Liberia) in the English Channel of the Royal Sovereign Lightship (United Kingdom) and was severely damaged.
Mahronda	United Kingdom	The cargo ship collided with Belas (Portugal) in the English Channel and was beached at Netley, Hampshire.

=== 6 May ===
List of shipwrecks: 6 May 1956
Ship	State	Description
Fred Everard	United Kingdom	The sailing vessel collided with Wall Brook (United Kingdom) and sank in the North Sea 8 nautical miles (15 km) off Ramsgate, Kent.

=== 7 May ===
List of shipwrecks: 7 May 1956
Ship	State	Description
USS Wisconsin	United States Navy	The Iowa-class battleship collided with the escort destroyer USS Eaton (United States Navy) off the coast of Virginia.

=== 9 May ===
List of shipwrecks: 9 May 1956
Ship	State	Description
Fred Everard	United Kingdom	The coaster was in collision with Walstream (United Kingdom) off Margate, Kent and sank with the loss of one of her six crew.
HMS Talent	Royal Navy	The T-class submarine was damaged in a collision with an unknown vessel whilst at periscope depth in the Solent.

=== 14 May ===
List of shipwrecks: 14 May 1956
Ship	State	Description
Howard Olson	United States	The steam schooner was in collision with Marine Leopard (United States) 175 nautical miles (324 km) south of San Francisco, California and sank with the loss of six of her 28 crew.

=== 18 May ===
List of shipwrecks: 18 May 1956
Ship	State	Description
Junyo Maru No. 3	Japan	The 84-ton salmon-fishing vessel disappeared near the Aleutian Islands with the loss of her entire crew of 22.
Mace	United States	The 10-gross register ton, 35.9-foot (10.9 m) fishing vessel was destroyed by fire at Castle Flats (56°38′30″N 133°15′30″W) in Southeast Alaska.

=== 20 May ===
List of shipwrecks: 20 May 1956
Ship	State	Description
Wafico No. 22	United States	The 16-gross register ton, 34.9-foot (10.6 m) fishing vessel foundered near Cape Saint Elias, Territory of Alaska.

=== 24 May ===
List of shipwrecks: 24 May 1956
Ship	State	Description
Orsova	United Kingdom	The ocean liner ran aground in Port Philip Bay, Victoria, Australia. Refloated with the aid of three tugs.

=== 28 May ===
List of shipwrecks: 28 May 1956
Ship	State	Description
P S F Co. No. 2	United States	The 41-gross register ton, 60.3-foot (18.4 m) scow sank off Foggy Cape (56°32′N 156°58′W) on Sutwik Island off the south coast of the Alaska Peninsula.

=== 29 May ===
List of shipwrecks: 29 May 1956
Ship	State	Description
Lynn D	United States	The 10-gross register ton motor vessel sank in the Gulf of Alaska 15 nautical miles (28 km; 17 mi) off Cape Saint Elias, Territory of Alaska.

=== 30 May ===
List of shipwrecks: 30 May 1956
Ship	State	Description
Ballyclare	United Kingdom	The cargo ship ran aground at Sarda Island in the Mull of Kintyre.
Lucky Carrier	Hong Kong	The tanker ran aground at Fakir Point, Burma. She was on a voyage from Chalna to Akyab. Refloated on 8 August, she was towed to Singapore where she was declared a constructive total loss. Scrapped in 1957.
Prins Bernhard	Netherlands	The coaster was in collision with Tanger (West Germany) in the English Channel off Folkestone, Kent. She sank, but all on board were rescued by the Dover lifeboat.

=== 31 May ===
List of shipwrecks: 31 May 1956
Ship	State	Description
Caronia	United Kingdom	The ocean liner ran aground at Messina, Sicily, Italy. Refloated the next day.

=== Unknown date ===
List of shipwrecks: Unknown date 1956
Ship	State	Description
Georgis L	Greece	The 45-metre (148 ft), 338-ton cargo ship, a former trawler, departed Suda Bay, Crete for Venice, Italy and vanished.
Hassel	Norway	Collided with a Liberian tanker. Beached at Folkestone, Kent. Later repaired and returned to service.

== June ==
=== 8 June ===
List of shipwrecks: 8 June 1956
Ship	State	Description
Badora	East Bengal	The passenger ship sank in the Bay of Bengal with the loss of all but six of the 202 people on board.

=== 12 June ===
List of shipwrecks: 12 June 1956
Ship	State	Description
Warri	United Kingdom	The coaster ran aground at Iwerekun, Nigeria. She was on a voyage from Sapele to Lagos. She was declared a total loss.

=== 17 June ===
List of shipwrecks: 17 June 1956
Ship	State	Description
Danaco No. 5	United States	The 88-gross register ton, 110-foot (33.5 m) barge sank in the Kuskokwim River approximately 12 miles (19 km) below Sleetmute, Territory of Alaska.

=== 21 June ===
List of shipwrecks: 21 June 1956
Ship	State	Description
Sea Star	United States	The cargo ship ran aground in the Suez Canal, Egypt. Later refloated.

=== 22 June ===
List of shipwrecks: 22 June 1956
Ship	State	Description
Shuna	United Kingdom	The cargo ship ran aground on the Isle of Muck, in the Inner Hebrides.

=== 24 June ===
List of shipwrecks: 24 June 1956
Ship	State	Description
P G No. 4	United States	The 8-gross register ton, 28.6-foot (8.7 m) fishing vessel sank near Egegik, Territory of Alaska, during a storm.

=== 26 June ===
List of shipwrecks: 26 June 1956
Ship	State	Description
Vicky	Australia	The collier sank off Wilson's Promonotory, Victoria with the loss of eight crew.

=== 30 June ===
List of shipwrecks: 30 June 1956
Ship	State	Description
Reform	United States	The 9-gross register ton, 34-foot (10.4 m) fishing vessel sank in Frederick Sound in the Alexander Archipelago in Southeast Alaska between Beacon Point and Twelve Mile Point.

== July ==
=== 5 July ===
List of shipwrecks: 5 July 1956
Ship	State	Description
Sheaf Royal	United Kingdom	The tanker ran aground off Singapore. Refloated four days later.

=== 8 July ===
List of shipwrecks: 8 July 1956
Ship	State	Description
Dione	France	The cargo ship collided with Michael C (Liberia) off the Goodwin Sands, Kent, United Kingdom.
Lord Warden	United Kingdom	The ferry collided with Tamba (France) 3 nautical miles (5.6 km) off Cap Gris Nez, Pas de Calais, France.
Marotte	France	The fishing vessel collided with Kenuta (United Kingdom) off the Eddystone Lighthouse in the English Channel and sank. All crew rescued by Kenuta.
Yewcroft	United Kingdom	The 827-ton steamship stranded in dense fog on the rocks of Trevean Cove, Cornwall, UK whilst carrying cement between Cliffe and Bristol. The captain believed he was near the Brisons at Cape Cornwall.

=== 11 July ===
List of shipwrecks: 11 July 1956
Ship	State	Description
Estoril	Panama	The Liberty ship collided with Dea Mazzella (Italy) and sank at 42°50′N 61°00′W.

=== 15 July ===
List of shipwrecks: 15 July 1956
Ship	State	Description
Hy-C-Tane	United States	The 10-gross register ton, 33.2-foot (10.1 m) fishing vessel sank in Ships Anchorage (58°43′40″N 157°00′45″W) at Naknek, Territory of Alaska.

=== 16 July ===
List of shipwrecks: 16 July 1956
Ship	State	Description
Maeda	Costa Rica	The cargo ship was in collision with Salsaas (Norway) and sank off the coast of the Netherlands. All crew rescued by Salsaas.

=== 17 July ===
List of shipwrecks: 17 July 1956
Ship	State	Description
Douglas	Norway	The cargo ship ran aground near the Maidens Lighthouse, County Antrim, United Kingdom. Refloated on 21 July with substantial damage.

=== 23 July ===
List of shipwrecks: 23 July 1956
Ship	State	Description
Kotka	Finland	The cargo ship was scuttled with a cargo of obsolete ammunition in the Atlantic Ocean.

=== 25 July ===
List of shipwrecks: 25 July 1956
Ship	State	Description
Andrea Doria	Italy	The Italian Line 29,083-ton ocean liner, sunk after collision with Stockholm (Sweden). 46 fatalities.

=== 29 July ===
List of shipwrecks: 29 July 1956
Ship	State	Description
Moyana	United Kingdom	The ketch foundered off The Lizard, Cornwall. All crew rescued by Clan Maclean (United Kingdom).
Teeswood	United Kingdom	The cargo ship capsized off Dungeness, Kent with the loss of one of her sixteen crew. She drifted and sank off Dover.

=== 30 July ===
List of shipwrecks: 30 July 1956
Ship	State	Description
Linda	United States	During a voyage in Southeast Alaska from Elfin Cove to North Inian Pass (58°17′N 136°22′W), the 30-foot (9.1 m) troller was swamped and sank with the loss of the 16-year-old boy who was the only person on board. A message in a bottle found a year later in the Gulf of Alaska off Yakutat, Territory of Alaska, was the only description of the vessel′s fate.

=== 31 July ===
List of shipwrecks: 31 July 1956
Ship	State	Description
Eskimo	United States	The 61-gross register ton, 75.1-foot (22.9 m) cannery tender was wrecked on the coast of Sitkalidak Island in the Territory of Alaska's Kodiak Archipelago, 4 nautical miles (7.4 km; 4.6 mi) south of Cape Barnabas (57°09′N 152°53′W). All four people and a dog who were aboard survived.

== August ==
=== 1 August ===
List of shipwrecks: 1 August 1956
Ship	State	Description
Far North	United States	The 8-gross register ton, 30.3-foot (9.2 m) fishing vessel was destroyed by fire in Prince William Sound on the south-central coast of the Territory of Alaska.

=== 9 August ===
List of shipwrecks: 9 August 1956
Ship	State	Description
RFA Wave King	Royal Navy	The Wave-class oiler struck a rock north of São Luís de Maranhão, Brazil and was severely damaged. Withdrawn from service and scrapped as a result.

=== 11 August ===
List of shipwrecks: 11 August 1956
Ship	State	Description
Lady Isle	United Kingdom	The VIC-type lighter was driven ashore on Tiree, Inner Hebrides and abandoned by her crew. Severely damaged, she was further damaged by gales on 28 September and was a total loss.

=== 12 August ===
List of shipwrecks: 12 August 1956
Ship	State	Description
Majestic	United States	The 104-gross register ton, 74.1-foot (22.6 m) fishing vessel was wrecked in the Shelikof Strait 12 nautical miles (22 km; 14 mi) off Puale Bay (57°41′N 155°29′W) on the coast of the Alaska Peninsula.

=== 14 August ===
List of shipwrecks: 14 August 1956
Ship	State	Description
Hondsrug	Netherlands	The coaster sank 10 nautical miles (19 km) north of Fyn Island, Denmark, with the loss of five of the seven people on board.

=== 15 August ===
List of shipwrecks: 15 August 1956
Ship	State	Description
Eunice H	United States	The 9-gross register ton, 32.4-foot (9.9 m) fishing vessel sank in Prince William Sound on the south-central coast of the Territory of Alaska.

=== 19 August ===
List of shipwrecks: 19 August 1956
Ship	State	Description
Argus	United States	The 22-gross register ton, 44-foot (13.4 m) fishing vessel was destroyed by fire at Ketchikan, Territory of Alaska.
Traquair	United Kingdom	The coaster sank 36 nautical miles (67 km) east of Aldeburgh, Suffolk. All eleven crew rescued.

=== 20 August ===
List of shipwrecks: 20 August 1956
Ship	State	Description
Excursion	United States	The 46-gross register ton, 65-foot (19.8 m) motor vessel was wrecked in Cordova Bay in the Alexander Archipelago in Southeast Alaska.

=== 22 August ===
List of shipwrecks: 22 August 1956
Ship	State	Description
Forman F	United States	The 6-gross register ton, 28.8-foot (8.8 m) fishing vessel sank off the north shore of McHenry Anchorage (55°58′N 132°27′W) on Etolin Island in the Alexander Archipelago in Southeast Alaska.

=== 25 August ===
List of shipwrecks: 25 August 1956
Ship	State	Description
Salmon Mule	United States	The 40-gross register ton, 51.9-foot (15.8 m) motor vessel sank in the Gulf of Alaska approximately 10 nautical miles (19 km; 12 mi) off Ocean Cape (59°32′30″N 139°51′30″W) in Southeast Alaska.

=== 26 August ===
List of shipwrecks: 26 August 1956
Ship	State	Description
Betty J	United States	The 45-gross register ton, 57.7-foot (17.6 m) fishing vessel sank 6.3 nautical miles (11.7 km; 7.2 mi) southwest of Yakutat, Territory of Alaska.

== September ==
=== 7 September ===
List of shipwrecks: 7 September 1956
Ship	State	Description
Seagate	Liberia	The Liberty ship ran aground on the Sonora Reef, of the coast of Washington, United States and broke in two.

=== 8 September ===
List of shipwrecks: 8 September 1956
Ship	State	Description
Italio	United States	The 53-gross register ton 64-foot (19.5 m) fishing vessel was destroyed near the eastern spit of the Kaliakh River (60°05′40″N 142°48′30″W) on the south-central coast of the Territory of Alaska, 12 miles (19 km) west of Cape Yakataga.
Sanco	United States	The 15-gross register ton, 40-foot (12.2 m) fishing vessel was destroyed by fire due east of Round Point Light (56°16′40″N 132°39′30″W) on Zarembo Island in the Alexander Archipelago in Southeast Alaska, 0.25 nautical miles (0.46 km; 0.29 mi) from Etolin Island.

=== 11 September ===
List of shipwrecks: 11 September 1956
Ship	State	Description
A P A-S-10	United States	The 95-gross register ton, 72.1-foot (22.0 m) scow wrecked at 55°59′12″N 134°05′36″W in the Spanish Islands (55.9606°N 134.1258°W) in Sumner Strait in the Alexander Archipelago in Southeast Alaska.
Liberty	United States	The 16-gross register ton, 39.5-foot (12.0 m) fishing vessel sank in Southeast Alaska off the Barrier Islands (54°48′N 132°25′W).
Valencia	United States	The 82-gross register ton, 69.5-foot (21.2 m) cargo vessel was wrecked on Spanish Island (55°57′N 134°07′W) in Southeast Alaska.

=== 12 September ===
List of shipwrecks: 12 September 1956
Ship	State	Description
Seattle	United States	The 21-gross register ton, 44.4-foot (13.5 m) fishing vessel was wrecked at King Cove, Territory of Alaska.

=== 13 September ===
List of shipwrecks: 13 September 1956
Ship	State	Description
Nedra	United States	The 11-gross register ton, 33.3-foot (10.1 m) fishing vessel was destroyed by fire on Long Island (57°46′N 152°17′W) near Kodiak, Territory of Alaska.

=== 15 September ===
List of shipwrecks: 15 September 1956
Ship	State	Description
Pelagia	Liberia	The Liberty ship broke in two and sank off the Lofoten Islands, Norway (67°15′N 11°35′E).

=== 16 September ===
List of shipwrecks: 16 September 1956
Ship	State	Description
Irene	Greece	The coaster foundered south east of Crete. All ten crew rescued by Norman Prince (United Kingdom).

=== 17 September ===
List of shipwrecks: 17 September 1956
Ship	State	Description
Ada	United States	The 13-gross register ton, 41.7-foot (12.7 m) motor cargo vessel was destroyed by fire in Gnat Cove (55°23′00″N 131°19′40″W) in Carroll Inlet (55.4728°N 131.3114°W) in Southeast Alaska.
Wild Bill	United States	The 8-gross register ton, 29.4-foot (9.0 m) fishing vessel was destroyed by fire in Ernest Sound in Southeast Alaska.

=== 25 September ===
List of shipwrecks: 25 September 1956
Ship	State	Description
Ada May	United States	The 10-gross register ton, 31.3-foot (9.5 m) fishing vessel was wrecked at Haines, Territory of Alaska.

=== 29 September ===
List of shipwrecks: 29 September 1956
Ship	State	Description
B & W No. 1	United States	The 188-gross register ton, 100-foot (30.5 m) cargo ship was wrecked on Nunivak Island in the Bering Sea southeast of Mekoryuk.

== October ==
=== 8 October ===
List of shipwrecks: 8 October 1956
Ship	State	Description
G P C 19	United States	The 12-gross register ton, 30.9-foot (9.4 m) fishing vessel was destroyed by fire while moored at Kodiak, Alaska.

=== 9 October ===
List of shipwrecks: 9 October 1956
Ship	State	Description
Dulcinea	United States	The 622-gross register ton, 166.5-foot (50.7 m) tanker was wrecked on Buldir Island in the Aleutian Islands.

=== 10 October ===
List of shipwrecks: 109 October 1956
Ship	State	Description
Tuva	United States	During a voyage from Seattle, Washington to Kodiak, Alaska, with a cargo of 30 tons of explosives, the 55-gross register ton, 49.9-foot (15.2 m) fishing vessel sank with the loss of four lives in the Gulf of Alaska about 30 nautical miles (56 km) from Cape Saint Elias on the southwest end of Kayak Island, Territory of Alaska, during a gale.

=== 12 October ===
List of shipwrecks: 12 October 1956
Ship	State	Description
HMS Anchorite	Royal Navy	The Amphion-class submarine ran aground in Rothesay Bay, Firth of Forth.

=== 14 October ===
List of shipwrecks: 14 October 1956
Ship	State	Description
Concha	Costa Rica	The cargo ship ran aground in the River Humber. Later refloated undamaged.

=== 20 October ===
List of shipwrecks: 20 October 1956
Ship	State	Description
Alert	United States	The 7-gross register ton, 35.4-foot (10.8 m) fishing vessel was wrecked on the beach at Hydaburg, Territory of Alaska.

=== 21 October ===
List of shipwrecks: 21 October 1956
Ship	State	Description
Lepus	Philippines	Typhoon Harriet: The cargo ship foundered off Legaspi with the loss of 25 of her 36 crew. The survivors were rescued by USS Castor (United States Navy).

=== 22 October ===
List of shipwrecks: 22 October 1956
Ship	State	Description
USS Antietam	United States Navy	The Essex-class aircraft carrier ran aground off Brest, France. Later refloated undamaged.

=== 23 October ===
List of shipwrecks: 23 October 1956
Ship	State	Description
Starlight	United States	The 14-gross register ton, 39.2-foot (11.9 m) fishing vessel was wrecked on the west side of Golf Island (56°47′30″N 135°23′00″W) in Southeast Alaska.

=== 27 October ===
List of shipwrecks: 27 October 1956
Ship	State	Description
Beilby	United States	The 15-gross register ton, 46.5-foot (14.2 m) fishing vessel ran aground and was lost off a location described as "Point Lookout" in the Territory of Alaska, which could refer to a number of locations but most likely is the Point Lookout (57°39′00″N 133°40′30″W) in Southeast Alaska closest to Beilby's home port of Wrangel.

=== 31 October ===
List of shipwrecks: 31 October 1956
Ship	State	Description
Alpheus	United Kingdom	The motor barge departed from Brightlingsea, Essex for London. She subsequently foundered with the loss of all hands.
Domiat	Egyptian Navy	Suez Crisis: The Rashid-class frigate was sunk by gunfire by the light cruiser HMS Newfoundland and the destroyer HMS Diana (both Royal Navy) 8 nautical miles (15 km; 9.2 mi) south of Suez.
Wimbledon	United Kingdom	The cargo ship foundered off Blakeney, Norfolk with the loss of one of her nineteen crew.

=== Unknown date ===
List of shipwrecks: Unknown date 1956
Ship	State	Description
Paul Solente	Egypt	Suez Crisis: The dredger was scuttled as a blockship in the Suez Canal at Port Said. Later raised, repaired and returned to service.
Pollux	Egypt	Suez Crisis: The dredger was scuttled as a blockship in the Suez Canal at Port Said.

== November ==
=== 1 November ===
List of shipwrecks: 1 November 1956
Ship	State	Description
Aboukir	Egyptian Navy	Suez Crisis: The Rashid-class frigate was scuttled as a blockship in the Suez Canal. Refloated on 8 April 1957, she was beached and abandoned.
Aka	Egyptian Navy	Suez Crisis: The landing ship tank was scuttled as a blockship in the Suez Canal near Timsah. She was refloated in February 1957, beached, and abandoned.
ex-HMS Papua	Egyptian Navy	Suez Crisis: The merchant passenger ship, a decommissioned Colony-class frigate that had been acquired for reconversion into a warship for the Egyptian Navy, was scuttled as a blockship in the Suez Canal. She was refloated, beached and abandoned later.
ex-HMS Tobago	Egyptian Navy	Suez Crisis: The merchant passenger ship, a decommissioned Colony-class frigate that had been acquired for reconversion into a warship for the Egyptian Navy, was scuttled as a blockship in the Suez Canal. She was refloated, beached and abandoned later.

=== 3 November ===
List of shipwrecks: 3 November 1956
Ship	State	Description
Aida	Egyptian Navy	Suez Crisis: The ship was sunk by Israeli Dassault Mystère IV aircraft.

=== 4 November ===
List of shipwrecks: 4 November 1956
Ship	State	Description
No. 220	Egyptian Navy	Suez Crisis: The No. 260-class motor torpedo boat was sunk by Hawker Sea Hawk aircraft from the aircraft carrier HMS Bulwark (Royal Navy).
No. 227	Egyptian Navy	Suez Crisis: The No. 260-class motor torpedo boat was sunk by Hawker Sea Hawk aircraft from the aircraft carrier HMS Bulwark (Royal Navy).

=== 5 November ===
List of shipwrecks: 5 November 1956
Ship	State	Description
Carmella	United States	The 16-gross register ton, 50.4-foot (15.4 m) fishing vessel was destroyed by fire in Coon Cove (55°27′20″N 131°29′15″W) in Southeast Alaska.

=== 6 November ===
List of shipwrecks: 6 November 1956
Ship	State	Description
Chum	United States	The 11-gross register ton, 32.3-foot (9.8 m) fishing vessel sank off Sukoi Island (56°53′30″N 132°55′25″W) in Frederick Sound in the Alexander Archipelago in Southeast Alaska.
Opalia	United Kingdom	Suez Crisis: The tanker was sunk or scuttled at Port Said, Egypt. Unclear of operational status, trapped in port or part of British forces. Raised in 1959, repaired and put in service as 23 December (Egypt).

=== 14 November ===
List of shipwrecks: 14 November 1956
Ship	State	Description
Port Victor	United Kingdom	The cargo ship collided with a Soviet merchant ship in the Scheldt, Belgium.

=== 16 November ===
List of shipwrecks: 16 November 1956
Ship	State	Description
Neritopsis	United Kingdom	The Empire Pym-type tanker struck a rock in the South China Sea off Palawan Island, Borneo (8°32′N 116°40′E) and sank. Her crew rescued by Nellore (United Kingdom). Neritopsis was on a voyage from Miri, Malaya to Shimotsu, Japan.

=== 19 November ===
List of shipwrecks: 19 November 1956
Ship	State	Description
Ussona	United States	The 16-gross register ton, 42.9-foot (13.1 m) fishing vessel was destroyed by fire at Deer Island in Ernest Sound in the Alexander Archipelago in Southeast Alaska.

=== 20 November ===
List of shipwrecks: 20 November 1956
Ship	State	Description
USS Hartford	United States Navy	The decommissioned steam sloop-of-war sank at her berth at the Norfolk Navy Yard in Portsmouth, Virginia. She subsequently was scrapped.

=== 21 November ===
List of shipwrecks: 21 November 1956
Ship	State	Description
M-200	Soviet Navy	The submarine collided with the destroyer Statnyj (Soviet Navy) and sank with the loss of 30 lives.

=== Unknown date ===
List of shipwrecks: Unknown November 1956
Ship	State	Description
Lacovos	Greece	Suez Crisis: The 2,037-ton cargo vessel was scuttled in Port Suez. Raised in 1957 and scrapped in 1959.
No. 15	Egyptian Navy	Suez Crisis: The landing craft mechanized was lost on 3 or 4 November, possibly scuttled as a blockship in the Suez Canal.
No. 20	Egyptian Navy	Suez Crisis: The landing craft mechanized was lost on 3 or 4 November, possibly scuttled as a blockship in the Suez Canal.
Zamalek	Egypt	Suez Crisis: The cargo ship, a former LS-class landing ship, was sunk in the Suez Canal at Port Tewfik, or in the harbor at Suez, Egypt during an attack by British and/or French aircraft, or scuttled by the Egyptians in Suez harbor on 3, 4 or 5 November. Later scrapped in place post war.

== December ==
=== 3 December ===
List of shipwrecks: 3 December 1956
Ship	State	Description
Herewego	United States	The 8-gross register ton, 35.2-foot (10.7 m) fishing vessel sank off Saint John Harbor (56°27′00″N 132°57′30″W) on Zarembo Island in the Alexander Archipelago in Southeast Alaska.

=== 12 December ===
List of shipwrecks: 12 December 1956
Ship	State	Description
Southern Hunter	United Kingdom	The 441 GRT steam-powered whaler was wrecked trying to avoid a vessel of the Argentine Navy coming in the opposite direction at Foster Harbour, Deception Island, South Shetland Islands.

=== 14 December ===
List of shipwrecks: 14 December 1956
Ship	State	Description
Sea Parrot	United States	The 25-gross register ton, 46-foot (14 m) fishing vessel sank in Prince William Sound on the coast of the Territory of Alaska.

=== 17 December ===
List of shipwrecks: 17 December 1956
Ship	State	Description
Farragut	United States	The 13-gross register ton, 33.3-foot (10.1 m) fishing vessel sank off Point Higgins (55°27′28″N 131°50′00″W) in Southeast Alaska.

=== 20 December ===
List of shipwrecks: 20 December 1956
Ship	State	Description
Lukuga	Belgium	Collided off Terschelling, Netherlands with Bernhard Hansen (Norway) and beached off Schiermonnikoog. Refloated 24 December and towed to Emden, Germany where repaired and returned to service.

=== 23 December ===
List of shipwrecks: 23 December 1956
Ship	State	Description
Prospector; Santa Elena	United Kingdom; Honduras	The cargo ship Prospector collided with the Liberty ship Santa Elena in the River Thames near Tilbury, Essex. Prospector was towed in to Tilbury. Santa Elena put in to Gravesend, Kent.

=== 26 December ===
List of shipwrecks: 26 December 1956
Ship	State	Description
Sunlong	Norway	The Liberty ship sprang a leak and sank off Kristiansand, Norway. All 36 crew were rescued by Borre (Norway). Sunlong was on a voyage from Narvik to Rotterdam, South Holland, Netherlands.

=== Unknown date ===
List of shipwrecks: Unknown date 1956
Ship	State	Description
Costa del Marfil	Spain	The cargo ship sank off the Canary Islands. Thirteen crew survived.
Nojima Maru	Japan	The stern section of the transport (6,940 GRT, 1934) wrecked in World War II was refloated in early 1956, departed for scrapping in Japan but sank en route.
