= HMS Tortola =

Colony-class frigate

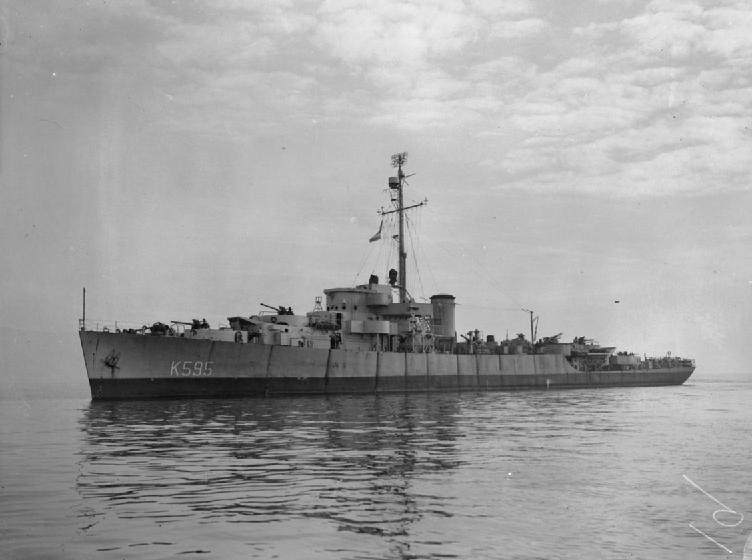
- HMS Tortola at Greenock, Scotland, on 21 September 1944.

History

United States
- Name: USS Peyton
- Namesake: British name assigned in anticipation of ship's transfer to United Kingdom
- Reclassified: Patrol frigate, PF-91, 15 April 1943
- Builder: Walsh-Kaiser Company, Providence, Rhode Island
- Laid down: 16 October 1943
- Renamed: Tortola, 1943
- Namesake: Tortola
- Launched: 16 November 1943
- Completed: 15 May 1944
- Commissioned: never
- Identification: PG-199
- Fate: Transferred to United Kingdom 15 May 1944
- Acquired: Returned by United Kingdom 22 May 1946
- Stricken: 3 July 1946
- Fate: Sold for scrapping 17 January 1947; Scrapped 1947

United Kingdom
- Name: HMS Tortola
- Namesake: Tortola
- Acquired: 15 May 1944
- Commissioned: 16 May 1944
- Decommissioned: August 1945
- Identification: Pennant number: K595
- Honours and awards: Battle honours for Arctic 1944 and Atlantic 1944-1945
- Fate: Returned to U.S. Navy 22 May 1946

General characteristics
- Class & type: Colony/Tacoma-class patrol frigate
- Displacement: 1,264 long tons (1,284 t)
- Length: 303 ft 11 in (92.63 m)
- Beam: 37 ft 6 in (11.43 m)
- Draft: 13 ft 8 in (4.17 m)
- Propulsion: 3 × boilers; 2 × turbines, 5,500 shp (4,100 kW) each; 2 shafts
- Speed: 20 knots (37 km/h; 23 mph)
- Complement: 190
- Armament: 3 × single 3 in (76 mm)/50 cal. AA guns; 2 × twin 40 mm guns; 9 × single 20 mm; 1 × Hedgehog anti-submarine mortar; 8 × Y-gun depth charge projectors; 2 × depth charge racks

HMS Tortola (K595) was a Colony-class frigate of the United Kingdom that served during World War II. She originally was ordered by the United States Navy as the Tacoma-class patrol frigate USS Peyton (PF-91) and was transferred to the Royal Navy prior to completion.

== Construction and acquisition ==
The ship, originally designated a "patrol gunboat," PG-199, was ordered by the United States Maritime Commission under a U.S. Navy contract as USS Peyton. She was reclassified as a "patrol frigate," PF-91, on 15 April 1943 and laid down by the Walsh-Kaiser Company at Providence, Rhode Island, on 16 October 1943. Intended for transfer to the United Kingdom, the ship was renamed Tortola by the British prior to launching and was launched on 16 November 1943. She was completed on 15 May 1944.

== Service history ==
Tortola was transferred to the United Kingdom under Lend-Lease simultaneously with her completion on 15 May 1944, and the Royal Navy commissioned her on 16 May 1944. She began acceptance trials and, upon completing them, steamed to Bermuda in June 1944 for shakedown, which lasted into July 1944. In August 1944 she steamed to St. John's in the Dominion of Newfoundland, from which she departed on 11 September 1944 as part of Convoy HX 307, a convoy of 73 ships bound for the United Kingdom. She left the convoy on 20 September and on 25 September began an overhaul to modify her for Royal Navy service.

With her modifications complete, Tortola reported to the 20th Escort Group – which also included her sister ships Bahamas, Papua, Pitcairn, and Somaliland and the frigate Tavy – on 3 October 1944. Her first assignment was as an escort for Convoy KMF 35, consisting of six merchant ships, which departed the River Clyde in Scotland on 20 October 1944 bound for Port Said, Egypt, via the Mediterranean Sea. She detached from the convoy on 25 October 1944 and proceeded to Marseille, France, from which she departed on 28 October 1944 as escort for Convoy MKA 35A, consisting of a single ship carrying bullion to Liverpool. She returned to duty with the 20th Escort Group after arriving at the River Clyde on 2 November 1944.

On 29 November 1944, Tortola and the rest of the 20th Escort Group departed Loch Ewe, Scotland, as part of a strong escort provided for the large Arctic convoy JW 62 bound for the Kola Inlet in the Soviet Union. The convoy arrived safely at the Kola on 7 December 1944. On 10 December 1944, she departed the Kola with the other escorts to attack German submarines assembling to interdict the return convoy RA 62, then joined the convoy itself later in the day. German submarines and aircraft attacked the convoy on 11 and 12 December 1944, badly damaging the British destroyer HMS Cassandra. Tortola and the rest of the 20th Escort Group detached from the convoy on 19 December 1944 and returned to patrol and escort duties in the Western Approaches.

After 1945 began, Tortola was assigned to duty escorting convoys between the United Kingdom and Gibraltar. On 5 January 1945, she joined the escort of Convoy KMF 38, which arrived at Gibraltar on 10 January 1945; she then departed Gibraltar on 21 January 1945 for the return voyage, escorting Convoy MKF 38, which arrived at the River Clyde on 27 January 1945. She quickly got back underway to join the escort of Convoy KMF 39 on 28 January 1945 for a voyage to Gibraltar which ended on 5 February 1945. She then entered the dockyard there for repairs.

With her repairs complete, Tortola departed Gibraltar on 20 February 1945 as part of the escort of Convoy MKF 39 bound for the United Kingdom, but on 21 February 1945 she ran aground near Gibraltar and suffered serious damage, losing her starboard bilge keel and opening her fuel tank to the sea. Detached from the convoy on 22 February 1945, she proceeded independently to Plymouth Dockyard in England for repairs, which began on 26 February 1945.

Tortola's repairs were completed on 30 June 1945, but she underwent additional repairs at Devonport Dockyard from 6 to 12 July 1945. After these were finished, Tortola was selected to be placed in reserve. In August 1945 she proceeded to Derry – also called Londonderry – in Northern Ireland, where she was placed in reserve upon arrival.

In January 1946, the Royal Navy decided to return Tortola to the U.S. Navy. After making preparations for her voyage to the United States during February and March 1946, she left Derry in April 1946 bound for the Boston Navy Yard in Boston, Massachusetts, where she arrived on 9 May 1946. The Royal Navy formally returned her to the U.S. Navy on 22 May 1946.

== Disposal ==
On 17 June 1946, Tortola was transferred from the U.S. Navy to the U.S. Maritime Commission for disposal, and the U.S. Navy struck her from its Naval Vessel Register on 3 July 1946. The Maritime Commission sold her on 17 January 1947 to the John J. Duane Company of Quincy, Massachusetts, for scrapping. She later was resold to the Washburn Wire Company of Phillipsdale, Rhode Island. She arrived at the shipbreaking yard on 10 September 1947 and was scrapped.
