= HMS Hoste =

Two ships of the Royal Navy have borne the name HMS Hoste, after Captain Sir William Hoste. A third was planned, but entered service under a different name:

- HMS Hoste (1916) was a Parker-class flotilla leader launched in 1916 and sunk in a collision with HMS Negro later that year.
- HMS Hoste was to have been a frigate transferred under lend-lease. The name was changed in 1943 to HMS Nyasaland, and she became a Colony-class frigate.
- HMS Hoste (K566) was a Captain-class frigate transferred under lend-lease in 1943 and returned to the US Navy in 1945.
