= Hoste =

Hoste may refer to:

== Places ==
- Hoste, Galanta District, a village in the Trnava Region (Galanta District) of Slovakia
- Hoste, Moselle, a commune in the Moselle département of France
- Hoste (island), an island in the Magallanes y la Antártica Chilena Region of Chile

== People ==
- Dixon Edward Hoste (1861-1946), English missionary to China
- James Hoste (Castle Rising MP) (1633–1699), English politician
- James Hoste (Bramber MP) (1705–1744), English politician
- Paul Hoste (1652–1700), French Jesuit priest and naval tactician
- William Hoste (1780–1828), English officer in the Royal Navy
- George Charles Hoste (1786–1845), English officer in the British Army
- Richard Hoste, former pseudonym used by Richard Hanania

== Ships ==
- HMS Hoste, the name of more than one Royal Navy ship
- USS Hoste, the name of more than one United States Navy ship

== Terms ==
- Hueste, Portuguese designation of the medieval armies of the Iberian Peninsula
