= USS Hammond =

USS Hammond may refer to more than one United States Navy ship:

- USS Hamond (PF-73), sometimes spelled "Hammond," a patrol frigate transferred to the United Kingdom prior to completion which served in the Royal Navy as HMS Antigua (K501) from 1943 to 1945
- USS Francis Hammond (FF-1067), an ocean escort, later reclassified as a frigate, in commission from 1970 to 1992
