= USS Hoste =

USS Hoste has been the name of more than one United States Navy ship, and may refer to:

- USS Hoste (PF-83), a patrol frigate transferred to the United Kingdom while under construction which served in the Royal Navy as HMS Nyasaland (K587) from 1944 to 1946
- USS Hoste (DE-521), a destroyer escort in commission from August to October 1945, previously in service from 1944 to 1945 in the British Royal Navy as HMS Hoste (K566)
