= Vixen Inlet =

Inlet within the U.S. state of Alaska

Coordinates: 55.82°N 132.091940°W

Vixen Inlet is located within the U.S. state of Alaska. It is situated 6.5 miles (10.5 km) north-northeast of Lemesurier Point, the south point at the entrance to Ernest Sound. The inlet has a small islet—Sunshine Island—in the middle of its entrance, and a stream at its head. A reef is southward from the south side of Vixen Point. A reef, unmarked by kelp, lies in the middle of the entrance, about 1 mile (1.6 km) west-southwestward of Sunshine Island. There is deep water between it and the shore southward. A rock on each side near the entrance, and a rock inside of Sunshine Island, are recorded.
