= Somaliland (disambiguation) =

Somaliland is a partially unrecognized state in the Horn of Africa.

Somaliland may also refer to:

== Places ==
- British Somaliland, a former British protectorate; present-day Somaliland
- French Somaliland, a former French colony in the Horn of Africa; present-day Djibouti
- Italian Somaliland, a former Italian colony; present-day Somalia
- State of Somaliland, a short-lived independent country in the territory of present-day Somaliland
- Trust Territory of Somaliland, a former United Nations Trust Territory under Italian administration; present-day Somalia

== Ships ==
- HMS Somaliland (K594), a British frigate that served in the Royal Navy from 1944 to 1946
