= HMS Ascension =

Colony-class frigate

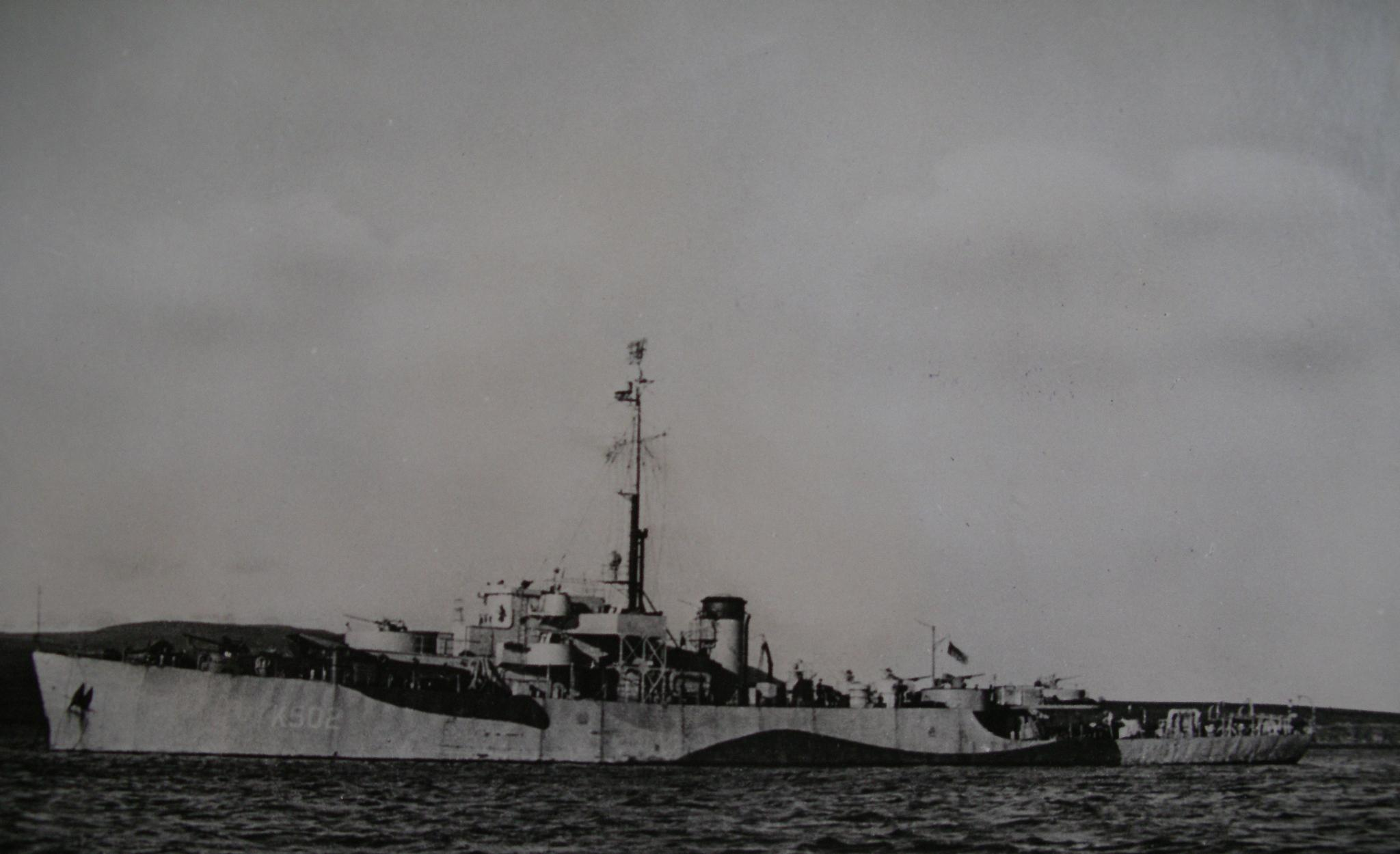
- HMS Ascension

History

United States
- Name: USS Hargood
- Namesake: William Hargood (1762-1839), British naval officer (British name assigned in anticipation of ship's transfer to United Kingdom)
- Builder: Walsh-Kaiser Company, Providence, Rhode Island
- Reclassified: Patrol frigate 15 April 1943
- Laid down: 30 April 1943
- Renamed: USS Ascension, 1943
- Namesake: Ascension Island (British name assigned in anticipation of ship's transfer to United Kingdom)
- Launched: 6 August 1943
- Identification: PG-182; PF-74
- Fate: Transferred to United Kingdom 24 November 1943
- Acquired: Returned by United Kingdom 31 May 1946
- Fate: Sold 16 October 1947 for scrapping

United Kingdom
- Name: HMS Ascension
- Namesake: Ascension Island
- Acquired: 24 November 1943
- Commissioned: 24 November 1943
- Identification: K502
- Fate: Returned to United States 31 May 1946

General characteristics
- Class & type: Colony/Tacoma-class frigate
- Displacement: 1,264 long tons (1,284 t)
- Length: 303 ft 11 in (92.63 m)
- Beam: 37 ft 6 in (11.43 m)
- Draft: 13 ft 8 in (4.17 m)
- Propulsion: 3 × boilers; 2 × turbines, 5,500 shp (4,100 kW) each; 2 shafts
- Speed: 20 knots (37 km/h; 23 mph)
- Complement: 190
- Armament: 3 × single 3 inch/50 AA guns; 2 × twin 40 mm guns; 9 × single 20 mm; 1 × Hedgehog anti-submarine mortar; 8 × Y-gun depth charge projectors; 2 × depth charge racks

HMS Ascension (K502) was a Colony-class frigate of the United Kingdom that served in the Royal Navy during World War II. She originally was ordered by the United States Navy as the Tacoma-class frigate USS Hargood (PF-74) and was transferred to the Royal Navy prior to completion.

== Construction and acquisition ==
The ship, originally designated a "patrol gunboat," PG-182, was ordered by the United States Maritime Commission under a United States Navy contract as the first USS Hargood, a British name she carried because of her intended transfer to the United Kingdom. Reclassified as a "patrol frigate," PF-74, on 15 April 1943, she was laid down by the Walsh-Kaiser Company at Providence, Rhode Island, on 30 April 1943. The British renamed her Ascension prior to launching. She was launched on 6 August 1943, sponsored by Mrs. A. A. Kirby.

== Service history ==
Transferred to the United Kingdom under Lend-Lease on 24 November 1943, the ship served in the Royal Navy as HMS Ascension (K502) on patrol and escort duty. On 25 November 1944 she sank the German submarine U-482 with depth charges in the North Atlantic Ocean west of the Shetland Islands at 60°18′00″N 004°52′00″W.

On 14 March 1945, Ascension led a Royal Navy hunter-killer group to the scene of an attack by the South African Navy frigate HMSAS Natal on the German submarine U-714 off St. Abbs, Scotland, which had brought oil and a metal tank to the surface at 55°57′00″N 001°57′00″W. While Natal proceeded to Scapa Flow in the Orkney Islands, Ascension's group depth-charged the position, bringing more flotsam from the submarine to the surface. The destroyer HMS Wivern claimed a share of the kill after depth-charging an oil slick 10 nautical miles (19 km; 12 mi) to the south under the assumption that it was oil from U-714, which Wivern's crew believed had been only been damaged by Natal and was attempting to escape. Although some controversy surrounds credit for the sinking, naval authorities later determined that Natal had sunk U-714 with the loss of the submarine's entire crew of 50 men and gave Natal sole credit for the sinking.

== Disposal ==
The United Kingdom returned Ascension to the U.S. Navy on 31 May 1946. She was sold to the Hudson Valley Shipwrecking Corporation of Newburgh, New York, for scrapping on 16 October 1947.
