= HMS St. Helena =

Colony-class frigate

History

United States
- Name: USS Pasley
- Namesake: Admiral Sir Thomas Pasley (1734-1808), British naval officer who commanded from his flagship HMS Bellerophon at the Glorious First of June in 1794. British name assigned in anticipation of ship's transfer to United Kingdom
- Reclassified: Patrol frigate, PF-86, 15 April 1943
- Builder: Walsh-Kaiser Company, Providence, Rhode Island
- Laid down: 22 September 1943
- Renamed: St. Helena, 1943
- Namesake: Saint Helena (British name assigned in anticipation of ship's transfer to United Kingdom)
- Launched: 20 October 1943
- Commissioned: never
- Identification: PG-194
- Fate: Transferred to United Kingdom 19 February 1944
- Acquired: Returned by United Kingdom 8 April 1946
- Renamed: USS St. Helena
- Namesake: British name retained
- Stricken: 19 June 1946
- Fate: Transferred to U.S. Maritime Commission 1 April 1947 for disposal; Sold for scrapping 1 July 1947; Scrapped 28 October 1947

United Kingdom
- Name: HMS St. Helena
- Namesake: Saint Helena
- Acquired: 19 February 1944
- Commissioned: 19 February 1944
- Decommissioned: 1945
- Identification: Pennant number: K590
- Fate: Returned to United States 8 April 1946

General characteristics
- Class & type: Colony/Tacoma-class patrol frigate
- Displacement: 1,264 long tons (1,284 t)
- Length: 303 ft 11 in (92.63 m)
- Beam: 37 ft 6 in (11.43 m)
- Draft: 13 ft 8 in (4.17 m)
- Propulsion: 3 × boilers; 2 × turbines, 5,500 shp (4,100 kW) each; 2 shafts
- Speed: 20 knots (37 km/h; 23 mph)
- Complement: 190
- Armament: 3 × single 3 in (76 mm)/50 cal. AA guns; 2 × twin 40 mm guns; 9 × single 20 mm; 1 × Hedgehog anti-submarine mortar; 8 × Y-gun depth charge projectors; 2 × depth charge racks

HMS St. Helena (K590) was a Colony-class frigate of the United Kingdom that served during World War II. She originally was ordered by the United States Navy as the Tacoma-class patrol frigate USS Pasley (PF-86) and was transferred to the Royal Navy prior to completion. After the British returned her to the United States in 1946, she briefly carried the name USS St. Helena (PF-86).

== Construction and acquisition ==
The ship, originally designated a "patrol gunboat," PG-194, was ordered by the United States Maritime Commission under a United States Navy contract as USS Pasley. She was reclassified as a "patrol frigate," PF-86, on 15 April 1943 and laid down by the Walsh-Kaiser Company at Providence, Rhode Island, on 22 September 1943. Intended for transfer to the United Kingdom, the ship was renamed St. Helena by the British prior to launching and was launched on 20 October 1943.

== Service history ==
Transferred to the United Kingdom under Lend-Lease on 19 February 1944, the ship served in the Royal Navy as HMS St. Helena (K590) until decommissioned in 1945.

== Disposal ==
The United Kingdom returned St. Helena to the U.S. Navy at Norfolk, Virginia, on 8 April 1946, and she temporarily was placed on the Naval Vessel Register as USS St. Helena (PF-86). Struck from the Naval Vessel Register on 19 June 1946, she was transferred for disposal on 1 April 1947 to the U.S. Maritime Commission, which sold her to the Sun Shipbuilding and Drydock Company of Chester, Pennsylvania, on 1 July 1947 for scrapping. Her scrapping date was 28 October 1947.

== Bibliography ==
- Photo gallery of HMS St. Helena at NavSource Naval History
