= HMS Caicos =

Colony-class frigate

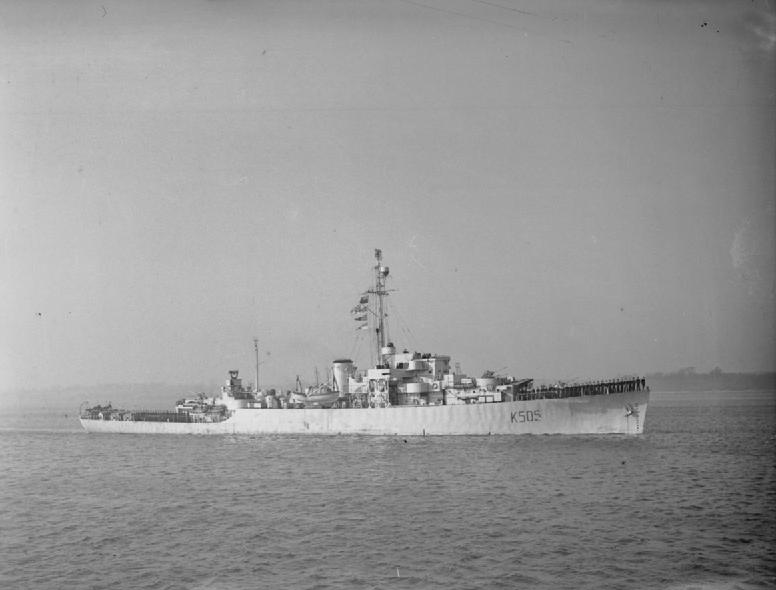
- HMS Caicos on 27 March 1945.

History

United States
- Name: USS Hannam
- Builder: Walsh-Kaiser Company, Providence, Rhode Island
- Laid down: 23 April 1943
- Renamed: Caicos, 1943
- Fate: Transferred to United Kingdom 31 December 1943

United Kingdom
- Name: HMS Caicos
- Namesake: The Caicos Islands
- Acquired: 31 December 1943
- Commissioned: 31 December 1943 or 2 January 1944
- Decommissioned: 1945
- Fate: Returned to United States 12 December 1945

History

United States
- Acquired: Returned by United Kingdom 12 December 1945
- Fate: Resold to Argentina 6 July 1947

Argentina
- Name: ARA Trinidad
- Namesake: Santísima Trinidad.
- Acquired: 6 July 1947
- Commissioned: 1948
- Renamed: ARA Santísima Trinidad (3 October 1950); Comodoro Augusto Laserre (1963)
- Stricken: 20 February 1969
- Honours and awards: Battle honor, 8 December 1960
- Fate: Sold for scrapping 1971

General characteristics
- Class & type: Colony-class frigate
- Displacement: 1,430 tons standard; 2,415 tons deep load
- Length: 285.5 ft (87.0 m) (waterline); 304.0 ft (92.7 m) (overall)
- Beam: 37.5 ft (11.4 m)
- Draught: 13.75 ft (4.19 m)
- Propulsion: Triple expansion, 2 × 3-drum type boilers, 2 shafts5,500 ihp (4,100 kW)
- Speed: 20.3 knots (37.6 km/h) (on first trials), 19 knots (35 km/h) (by 1963)
- Range: 7,800 nmi (14,400 km) at 12 knots (22 km/h); 700 tons oil
- Complement: 175 as frigate; 100 as survey vessel
- Armament: 2 × 105 mm (4.1 inch) L45 Bofors DP guns, 8 × 40 mm AA guns (2×2, 4×1), 1 × Hedgehog, 6 × Depth charge throwers, 2 Tracks

HMS Caicos was a Colony-class frigate of the United Kingdom that served during World War II. She was originally ordered by the United States Navy as the Tacoma-class patrol frigate USS Hannam and was transferred to the Royal Navy prior to completion. It was named after the Caicos Islands.

After her return to U.S. Navy custody, she was sold to Argentina and served in the Argentine Navy (Armada de la Republica Argentina) as a frigate under the names ARA Trinidad (P-34) and ARA Santísima Trinidad (P-34) from 1948 to 1962. After a refit she then served as a survey ship as ARA Augusto Lasserre (Q-9) from 1963 to 1969.

== Construction and acquisition ==
Originally designated a "patrol gunboat", she was ordered by the United States Maritime Commission under a U.S. Navy contract as Type S2-S2-AQ1 hull number 1659 and named USS Hannam. She was reclassified as a "patrol frigate", PF-77, on 15 April 1943 and laid down by the Walsh-Kaiser Company at Providence, Rhode Island, on 23 April 1943. Intended for transfer to the Royal Navy, the ship was renamed Caicos by the British before being launched on 6 September 1943.

== Service history ==
=== Royal Navy, World War II, 1943–1945 ===
Transferred to the United Kingdom under Lend-Lease on 31 December 1943, the ship was commissioned in the Royal Navy as HMS Caicos (K505) – sources claim that she was partially funded by the Turks and Caicos Islands colony, after part of which she was named – on either 31 December 1943 or 2 January 1944.

Uniquely among all World War II frigates, Caicos was fitted to perform aircraft direction duties. The Royal Navy originally intended to send her to the Indian Ocean, but instead assigned her to duty in the North Sea, where she attempted to detect German V-1 flying bombs during their flights toward targets in Great Britain. Two members of her crew died during her war service.

=== Disposal and transfer to Argentina ===
The United Kingdom returned Caicos to the U.S. Navy on 12 December 1945. The U.S. Navy then transferred her for disposal to the U.S. Maritime Commission, which sold her in June 1946 to the N. B. Wolcott firm of New York City for scrapping. However the plans to scrap her were cancelled and she was resold to Argentina on 6 July 1947. Thus, although many Tacoma-class patrol frigates served in foreign navies after completing their U.S. Navy service, Caicos became the only Colony-class frigate to serve in another navy after completing her British service.

=== Argentine Navy, 1947–1970 ===
==== Frigate, 1948–1960 ====
The ship was incorporated into the Argentine Navy on 4 August 1947, and assigned the name ARA Trinidad (P-34) in memory of ARA Santísima Trinidad, an Argentine Navy brigantine of 1815–1816 that saw action in the Argentine War of Independence. Commander (S) D. Rodolfo A. Muzzio initiated a campaign to assign the full name Santísima Trinidad to her, and she became ARA Santísima Trinidad (P-34) on 3 October 1950.

Santísima Trinidad served as part of the Frigate Force of the Sea Fleet from 1948 until 1960. During this time she operated in the South Atlantic Ocean, participating in annual fleet exercises, especially the antisubmarine warfare exercises she was designed for. In 1948–1949 she participated in the 11th Antarctic Campaign. In 1959, she participated in Operation Neptune II, and received a battle honour from Vicario General Castrense and Cardenal D. Antonio Caggiano on 8 December 1960. She then went into reserve from 1961 to 1962.

According to Janes Fighting Ships, her armament in Argentine service as Santísima Trinidad consisted of two 105 mm (4.1 in) guns, eight 40 mm antiaircraft guns, 1 Hedgehog antisubmarine mortar, and six depth charge throwers. Conway's states that she had four 47 mm antiaircraft guns instead of eight 40 mm antiaircraft guns.

==== Survey ship, 1963–1969 ====
Starting in 1962, Río Santiago Shipyard (AFNE) converted Santísima Trinidad into a survey ship. The conversion included disarming her, installing eight specialised cabinets, nine probe basins, and a helicopter landing platform, as well as a general refit. She was reclassified as a survey vessel (in Spanish Buque de Investigacion) and renamed ARA Comodoro Augusto Lasserre (Q-9), There was a spelling error in the original decree, which called her "Laserre" instead of "Lasserre"; this was corrected in 1964.

She was recommissioned as a survey ship on 27 January 1964. She undertook hydrographic surveys each year from 1964 to 1968. In 1968 she ran aground near Lion Island (Isla Leones) in the Palmer Archipelago during a storm. After she was refloated, she was inspected at Puerto Belgrano, and it was recommended that she be taken out of service. She was struck from the navy list on 20 February 1969. Her decommissioning ceremony was in March 1969, and she was sold for scrapping in 1971.
