= HMS Zanzibar =

Colony-class frigate

History

United States
- Name: USS Prowse
- Namesake: British name assigned in anticipation of ship's transfer to United Kingdom
- Reclassified: Patrol frigate, PF-92, 15 April 1943
- Builder: Walsh-Kaiser Company, Providence, Rhode Island
- Laid down: 20 October 1943
- Renamed: Zanzibar, 1943
- Namesake: Zanzibar
- Launched: 21 November 1943
- Identification: PG-200
- Fate: Transferred to the United Kingdom, 21 June 1944
- Acquired: Returned by United Kingdom 21 May 1946
- Stricken: 29 October 1946
- Fate: Sold for scrapping 17 June 1947

United Kingdom
- Name: HMS Zanzibar
- Acquired: 21 June 1944
- Commissioned: 21 June 1944
- Identification: Pennant number: K596
- Fate: Returned to the United States, 21 May 1946

General characteristics
- Class & type: Colony-class frigate
- Displacement: 1,264 long tons (1,284 t)
- Length: 303 ft 11 in (92.63 m)
- Beam: 37 ft 6 in (11.43 m)
- Draft: 13 ft 8 in (4.17 m)
- Propulsion: 3 × boilers; 2 × turbines, 5,500 shp (4,100 kW) each; 2 shafts
- Speed: 20 knots (37 km/h; 23 mph)
- Complement: 190
- Armament: 3 × single 3 in (76 mm)/50 AA guns; 2 × twin 40 mm guns; 9 × single 20 mm; 1 × Hedgehog anti-submarine mortar; 8 × Y-gun depth charge projectors; 2 × depth charge racks

HMS Zanzibar (K596) was a Colony-class frigate of the United Kingdom that served during World War II. She was ordered by the United States Navy as the Tacoma-class patrol frigate USS Prowse (PF-92) and was transferred to the Royal Navy prior to completion.

== Construction and acquisition ==
The ship, originally designated a "patrol gunboat," PG-200, was ordered by the United States Maritime Commission under a U.S. Navy contract as USS Prowse. She was reclassified as a "patrol frigate," PF-92, on 15 April 1943 and laid down by the Walsh-Kaiser Company at Providence, Rhode Island, on 20 October 1943. Intended for transfer to the United Kingdom, the ship was renamed Zanzibar by the British prior to her launch on 21 November 1943.

== Service history ==
Transferred to the United Kingdom under Lend-Lease on 21 June 1944, the ship served in the Royal Navy as HMS Zanzibar (K596). She operated out of Derry, Northern Ireland, and Greenock, Scotland, on convoy escort duty into the western Atlantic Ocean as far as Boston, Massachusetts. In addition, she served as a weather ship on Ocean Station No. 19 in both the spring of 1945 and the spring of 1946.

== Disposal ==
The United Kingdom returned Zanzibar to the U.S. Navy on 21 May 1946 at Brooklyn, New York. She was stricken from the U.S. Naval Vessel Register on 29 October 1946 and sold on 17 June 1947 for scrapping.
