= Deer Island (Alaska Panhandle) =

Island in Alaska, United States

Coordinates: 56°02′30″N 132°01′06″W

Deer Island is an island in the Alexander Archipelago of Southeast Alaska, United States. The island is 13.6 kilometres (8.5 mi) long and lies within Ernest Sound, 51.6 kilometres (32.1 mi) southeast of Wrangell, west of Cleveland Peninsula. The first European to sight the island was James Johnstone, one of George Vancouver’s officers during his 1791-95 expedition, in 1793. It was named in 1886 by Lieutenant Commander A. S. Snow, USN.
