= HMS Bahamas =

Colony-class frigate

History

United States
- Name: USS Hotham
- Namesake: Sir William Hotham (1772–1848), British naval officer who was commanding officer of HMS Adamant at the Battle of Camperdown in 1797 (British name assigned in anticipation of ship's transfer to United Kingdom)
- Builder: Walsh-Kaiser Company, Providence, Rhode Island
- Laid down: 7 April 1943
- Reclassified: Patrol frigate, 15 April 1943
- Renamed: Bahamas, 1943
- Namesake: The Bahamas (British name assigned in anticipation of ship's transfer to United Kingdom)
- Launched: 17 August 1943
- Sponsored by: Mrs. James A. Gallagher
- Acquired: by Captain Walter Thomson OBE
- Commissioned: never
- Identification: PG-183; PF-75
- Fate: Transferred to United Kingdom 6 December 1943
- Acquired: Returned by United Kingdom 11 June 1946
- Fate: Sold for scrapping 16 December 1947

United Kingdom
- Name: HMS Bahamas
- Namesake: The Bahamas
- Acquired: 6 December 1943
- Commissioned: 6 December 1943
- Identification: K503
- Fate: Returned to United States, 11 June 1946

General characteristics
- Class & type: Colony/Tacoma-class frigate
- Displacement: 1,264 long tons (1,284 t)
- Length: 303 ft 11 in (92.63 m)
- Beam: 37 ft 6 in (11.43 m)
- Draft: 13 ft 8 in (4.17 m)
- Propulsion: 3 × boilers; 2 × turbines, 5,500 shp (4,100 kW) each; 2 shafts
- Speed: 20 knots (37 km/h; 23 mph)
- Complement: 190
- Armament: 3 × single 3 in (76 mm)/50 AA guns; 2 × twin 40 mm guns; 9 × single 20 mm; 1 × Hedgehog anti-submarine mortar; 8 × Y-gun depth charge projectors; 2 × depth charge racks

HMS Bahamas (K503) was a Colony-class frigate of the United Kingdom that served during World War II. She originally was ordered by the United States Navy as the Tacoma-class frigate USS Hotham (PF-75) and was transferred to the Royal Navy prior to completion.

== Construction and acquisition ==
The ship, originally designated a "patrol gunboat," PG-183, was ordered by the United States Maritime Commission under a United States Navy contract as the first USS Hotham. Laid down by the Walsh-Kaiser Company at Providence, Rhode Island, on 7 April 1943, she was reclassified as a "patrol frigate," PF-75, on 15 April 1943. Intended for transfer to the United Kingdom, the ship was renamed Bahamas by the British prior to launching and was launched on 17 August 1943, sponsored by Mrs. James A. Gallagher.

== Service history ==
Transferred to the United Kingdom under Lend-Lease on 6 December 1943, the ship served in the Royal Navy as HMS Bahamas (K503) on patrol and escort duty. The most notable event of her career took place while she was part of the escort of an Arctic convoy in the Barents Sea on 11 November 1944; the German submarine U-365 blew the entire bow off of the British destroyer HMS Cassandra with a G7es ("GNAT") torpedo at 71°57′00″N 032°04′00″E, and Bahamas took Cassandra under tow stern-first toward the Kola Inlet in the Soviet Union. A Soviet tug later took over the tow from Bahamas and successfully delivered Cassandra to the Kola Inlet.

== Disposal ==
The United Kingdom returned Bahamas to the U.S. Navy on 11 June 1946. She was transferred to the U.S. Maritime Commission for disposal and subsequently sold to the John J. Duane Company of Quincy, Massachusetts, for scrapping on 16 December 1947.
