= HMS Pitcairn =

Colony-class frigate

History

United States
- Name: USS Piflord
- Namesake: British name assigned in anticipation of ship's transfer to United Kingdom
- Reclassified: Patrol frigate, PF-85, 15 April 1943
- Builder: Walsh-Kaiser Company, Providence, Rhode Island
- Laid down: 14 September 1943
- Renamed: Pitcairn, 1943
- Namesake: The Pitcairn Islands
- Launched: 15 October 1943
- Commissioned: never
- Identification: PG-193
- Fate: Transferred to United Kingdom 6 July 1944
- Acquired: Returned by United Kingdom 11 June 1946
- Stricken: 3 July 1946
- Fate: Sold for scrapping 5 November 1947

United Kingdom
- Name: HMS Pitcairn
- Namesake: Pitcairn Island
- Acquired: 6 July 1944
- Commissioned: 7 July 1944
- Identification: Pennant number: K589
- Fate: Returned to United States 11 June 1946

General characteristics
- Class & type: Colony/Tacoma-class patrol frigate
- Displacement: 1,264 long tons (1,284 t)
- Length: 303 ft 11 in (92.63 m)
- Beam: 37 ft 6 in (11.43 m)
- Draft: 13 ft 8 in (4.17 m)
- Propulsion: 3 × boilers; 2 × turbines, 5,500 shp (4,100 kW) each; 2 shafts
- Speed: 20 knots (37 km/h; 23 mph)
- Complement: 190
- Armament: 3 × single 3 in (76 mm)/50 cal. AA guns; 2 × twin 40 mm guns; 9 × single 20 mm; 1 × Hedgehog anti-submarine mortar; 8 × Y-gun depth charge projectors; 2 × depth charge racks

HMS Pitcairn (K589) was a Colony-class frigate of the United Kingdom that served during World War II. She originally was ordered by the United States Navy as the Tacoma-class patrol frigate USS Pilford (PF-85) and was transferred to the Royal Navy prior to completion.

== Construction and acquisition ==
The ship, originally designated a "patrol gunboat," PG-193, was ordered by the United States Maritime Commission under a U.S. Navy contract as USS Pilford. She was reclassified as a "patrol frigate," PF-85, on 15 April 1943 and laid down by the Walsh-Kaiser Company at Providence, Rhode Island, on 14 September 1943. Intended for transfer to the United Kingdom, the ship was renamed Pitcairn by the British prior to launching and was launched on 15 October 1943.

== Service history ==
Transferred to the United Kingdom under Lend-Lease on 6 July 1944, the ship was commissioned by the Royal Navy on 7 July 1944 as HMS Pitcairn (K589). She served on patrol and escort duty.

== Disposal ==
The United Kingdom returned Pitcairn to the U.S. Navy on 11 June 1946. She was stricken from the U.S. Naval Vessel Register on 3 July 1946 and transferred for disposal to the U.S. Maritime Commission, which sold her to the John J. Duane Company of Quincy, Massachusetts, on 5 November 1947 for scrapping.
