= HMS Tobago (K585) =

Colony-class frigate

History

United States
- Name: Holmes
- Namesake: A British name assigned in anticipation of delivery of the ship to the United Kingdom
- Reclassified: Patrol frigate, PF-81, 15 April 1943
- Builder: Walsh-Kaiser Company, Providence, Rhode Island
- Laid down: 17 August 1943
- Renamed: Hong Kong, 1943
- Namesake: Hong Kong
- Renamed: Tobago, 1943
- Namesake: Tobago
- Launched: 27 September 1943
- Commissioned: never
- Identification: PG-189
- Fate: Transferred to the United Kingdom, 12 August 1944
- Acquired: Returned by United Kingdom 13 May 1946
- Fate: Sold for scrapping; Scrapping canceled; Resold 1950 for use as civilian passenger ship; Sunk as block ship 1956

United Kingdom
- Name: HMS Tobago
- Namesake: Tobago
- Acquired: 12 August 1944
- Commissioned: 12 August 1944
- Decommissioned: 1945
- Identification: K585
- Fate: Returned to United States, 13 May 1946

General characteristics
- Class & type: Colony/Tacoma-class patrol frigate
- Displacement: 1,264 long tons (1,284 t)
- Length: 303 ft 11 in (92.63 m)
- Beam: 37 ft 6 in (11.43 m)
- Draft: 13 ft 8 in (4.17 m)
- Propulsion: 3 × boilers; 2 × turbines, 5,500 shp (4,100 kW) each; 2 shafts
- Speed: 20 knots (37 km/h; 23 mph)
- Complement: 190
- Armament: 3 × single 3-inch/50 cal. AA guns; 2 × twin 40 mm guns; 9 × single 20 mm; 1 × Hedgehog anti-submarine mortar; 8 × Y-gun depth charge projectors; 2 × depth charge racks

The fourth HMS Tobago (K585), ex-Hong Kong, was a Colony-class frigate of the United Kingdom which served in the Royal Navy during World War II. She originally was ordered by the United States Navy as the Tacoma-class patrol frigate USS Holmes (PF-81) and was transferred to the Royal Navy prior to completion.

== Construction and acquisition ==
The ship, originally designated a "patrol gunboat," PG-189, was ordered by the United States Maritime Commission under a United States Navy contract as the first USS Holmes. She was reclassified as a "patrol frigate," PF-81, on 15 April 1943 and laid down by the Walsh-Kaiser Company at Providence, Rhode Island, on 17 August 1943. Intended for transfer to the United Kingdom, the ship was first renamed Hong Kong and then Tobago by the British prior to launching and was launched on 27 September 1943, sponsored by Mrs. D. W. Ambridge of Ottawa, Ontario, Canada.

== Service history ==
Transferred to the United Kingdom under Lend-Lease on 12 August 1944, the ship served in the Royal Navy as HMS Tobago (K585) on patrol and escort duty until 1945.

== Disposal ==
The United Kingdom returned Tobago to the U.S. Navy on 13 May 1946. She subsequently was sold to the Boston Metals Company of Baltimore, Maryland, for scrapping, but her scrapping was cancelled and in 1950 she was resold to Khedivial Mail Lines of Alexandria, Egypt, for use as a civilian passenger vessel. She was sunk as a blockship in the Suez Canal in 1956.
