= 1956 Egypt ferry accident =

Ferry accident in Egypt

- Date: 13 February 1956
- Time: Morning
- Location: Near Dekernes at a tributary of the Nile, Egypt
- Participants: >45 passengers buffaloes/cows donkeys
- Deaths: 22 children

The 1956 Egypt ferry accident occurred in the morning on 13 February 1956 near Dekernes at a small tributary of the Nile, in Egypt. A passenger ferry capsized, killing 22 schoolchildren between 12 years old and 18 years old.

The accident has been listed by Dutch newspaper Het Huisgezin as one of the main international disasters of 1956.

== Accident ==
In February 1956 the foot bridge over the small channel near Dekernes was closed for repairs. People who wanted to cross the channel had to take a small ferry. In the morning of 13 February 1956 fourtyfive children took the ferry to go to school. The children became impatient after the ferryman did not show up. The children persuaded older passengers to lift the anchor and to cross the channel themselves. The ferry was heavily loaded. On board were over 45 passengers and also buffaloes/cows and donkeys. Halfway, a group of buffaloes started to moo loudly. The schoolchildren were startled and ran to the other side of the ferry. This caused the boat to list. A worn-out cable connecting the ferry to both banks snapped due to the tension. The ferry capsized. Twenty-two children between 12 years old and 18 years old (12 boys, 10 girls) drowned in the muddy water. 23 children were able to swim to the other side. The animals survived.
