= HMS Papua =

Colony-class frigate

History

United States
- Name: USS Howett
- Namesake: British name assigned in anticipation of ship's transfer to United Kingdom
- Reclassified: Patrol frigate, PF-84, 15 April 1943
- Builder: Walsh-Kaiser Company, Providence, Rhode Island
- Laid down: 7 September 1943
- Renamed: Papua, 1943
- Namesake: Territory of Papua
- Launched: 10 October 1943
- Sponsored by: Mrs. William Eastham
- Commissioned: never
- Identification: PG-192
- Fate: Transferred to United Kingdom, 25 July 1944
- Acquired: Returned by United Kingdom 13 May 1946
- Fate: Sold for scrapping; Scrapping cancelled; Resold 1950 for use as civilian passenger ship in Egypt; Sunk in collision 17 May 1953

United Kingdom
- Name: HMS Papua
- Namesake: Territory of Papua
- Acquired: 25 July 1944
- Commissioned: 25 July 1944
- Decommissioned: 1945
- Identification: Pennant number: K587
- Fate: Returned to United States 13 May 1946

General characteristics
- Class & type: Colony/Tacoma-class patrol frigate
- Displacement: 1,264 long tons (1,284 t)
- Length: 303 ft 11 in (92.63 m)
- Beam: 37 ft 6 in (11.43 m)
- Draft: 13 ft 8 in (4.17 m)
- Propulsion: 3 × boilers; 2 × turbines, 5,500 shp (4,100 kW) each; 2 shafts
- Speed: 20 knots (37 km/h; 23 mph)
- Complement: 190
- Armament: 3 × single 3-inch (76 mm)/50 AA guns; 2 × twin 40 mm guns; 9 × single 20 mm; 1 × Hedgehog anti-submarine mortar; 8 × Y-gun depth charge projectors; 2 × depth charge racks

HMS Papua (K588) was a Colony-class frigate of the United Kingdom that served during World War II. She originally was ordered by the United States Navy as the Tacoma-class patrol frigate USS Howett (PF-84) and was transferred to the Royal Navy prior to completion.

== Construction and acquisition ==
The ship, originally designated a "patrol gunboat," PG-192, was ordered by the United States Maritime Commission under a United States Navy contract as USS Howett. She was reclassified as a "patrol frigate," PF-84, on 15 April 1943 and laid down by the Walsh-Kaiser Company at Providence, Rhode Island, on 7 September 1943. Intended for transfer to the United Kingdom, the ship was renamed Papua by the British prior to launching and was launched on 10 October 1943, sponsored by Mrs. William Eastham.

== Service history ==
Transferred to the United Kingdom under Lend-Lease on 25 July 1944, the ship served in the Royal Navy as HMS Papua (K588) on patrol and escort duty. On 4 February 1945, she shared credit with the British frigates Loch Scavaig, Nyasaland, and Loch Shin for sinking the German submarine U-1014 in a depth-charge attack in the North Channel off Malin Head, Ireland, at 55°17′N 006°45′W. She was decommissioned later in 1945.

== Final disposition ==
The United Kingdom returned Papua to the U.S. Navy on 13 May 1946. She was sold to the Boston Metals Company of Baltimore, Maryland, for scrapping, but her scrapping was cancelled and she was resold 1950 to the Khedivial Mail Line of Alexandria, Egypt, for use as the civilian passenger ship SS Malrouk. Afterwards she was acquired by the Egyptian government, rearmed and commissioned as Misr.

Misr sank after a collision in the Gulf of Suez on 17 May 1953.
