= HMS Nyasaland =

Frigate of the Royal Navy

History

United States
- Name: USS Hoste
- Namesake: Captain Sir William Hoste (1780-1826), British naval officer (British name assigned in anticipation of ship's transfer to United Kingdom)
- Reclassified: Patrol frigate, PF-83, 15 April 1943
- Builder: Walsh-Kaiser Company, Providence, Rhode Island
- Laid down: 7 September 1943
- Renamed: Nyasaland, 1943
- Namesake: Nyasaland (British name assigned in anticipation of ship's transfer to United Kingdom)
- Launched: 6 October 1943
- Sponsored by: Mrs. William A. Cahir
- Commissioned: never
- Identification: PG-191
- Fate: Transferred to United Kingdom, 31 July 1944
- Acquired: Returned by United Kingdom 15 April 1946
- Fate: Sold for scrapping 10 November 1947

United Kingdom
- Name: HMS Nyasaland
- Namesake: Nyasaland
- Acquired: 31 July 1944
- Commissioned: 31 July 1944
- Identification: Pennant number: K587
- Fate: Returned to United States 15 April 1946

General characteristics
- Class & type: Colony/Tacoma-class patrol frigate
- Displacement: 1,264 long tons (1,284 t)
- Length: 303 ft 11 in (92.63 m)
- Beam: 37 ft 6 in (11.43 m)
- Draft: 13 ft 8 in (4.17 m)
- Propulsion: 3 × boilers; 2 × turbines, 5,500 shp (4,100 kW) each; 2 shafts
- Speed: 20 knots (37 km/h; 23 mph)
- Complement: 190
- Armament: 3 × single 3 in (76 mm)/50 cal. AA guns; 2 × twin 40 mm guns; 9 × single 20 mm; 1 × Hedgehog anti-submarine mortar; 8 × Y-gun depth charge projectors; 2 × depth charge racks

HMS Nyasaland (K587) was a Colony-class frigate of the United Kingdom that served during World War II. She originally was ordered by the United States Navy as the Tacoma-class patrol frigate USS Hoste (PF-83) and was transferred to the Royal Navy prior to completion.

== Construction and acquisition ==
The ship, originally designated a "patrol gunboat," PG-191, was ordered by the United States Maritime Commission under a United States Navy contract as the first USS Hoste. She was reclassified as a "patrol frigate," PF-83, on 15 April 1943 and laid down by the Walsh-Kaiser Company at Providence, Rhode Island, on 7 September 1943. Intended for transfer to the United Kingdom, the ship was renamed Nyasaland by the British prior to launching and was launched on 6 October 1943, sponsored by Mrs. William A. Cahir.

== Service history ==
Transferred to the United Kingdom under Lend-Lease on 31 July 1944, the ship served in the Royal Navy as HMS Nyasaland (K587) on patrol and escort duty. On 17 December 1944, she sank the German submarine U-772 with depth charges in the North Atlantic Ocean south of Cork, Ireland, at 51°16′N 008°05′W. On 4 February 1945, she shared credit with the British frigates Loch Scavaig, Papua, and Loch Shin for sinking the German submarine U-1014 in a depth-charge attack in the North Channel off Malin Head, Ireland, at 55°17′N 006°45′W. On 2 March 1945, she rescued 42 survivors of the British merchant ship SS King Edgar, which the German submarine U-1302 had sunk in St. George's Channel at 52°05′N 005°42′W.

== Disposal ==
The United Kingdom returned Nyasaland to the U.S. Navy on 15 April 1946. She was sold to the Sun Shipbuilding & Dry Dock Company of Chester, Pennsylvania, on 10 November 1947 for scrapping.
