= USS LST-178 =

LST-1-class landing ship tank

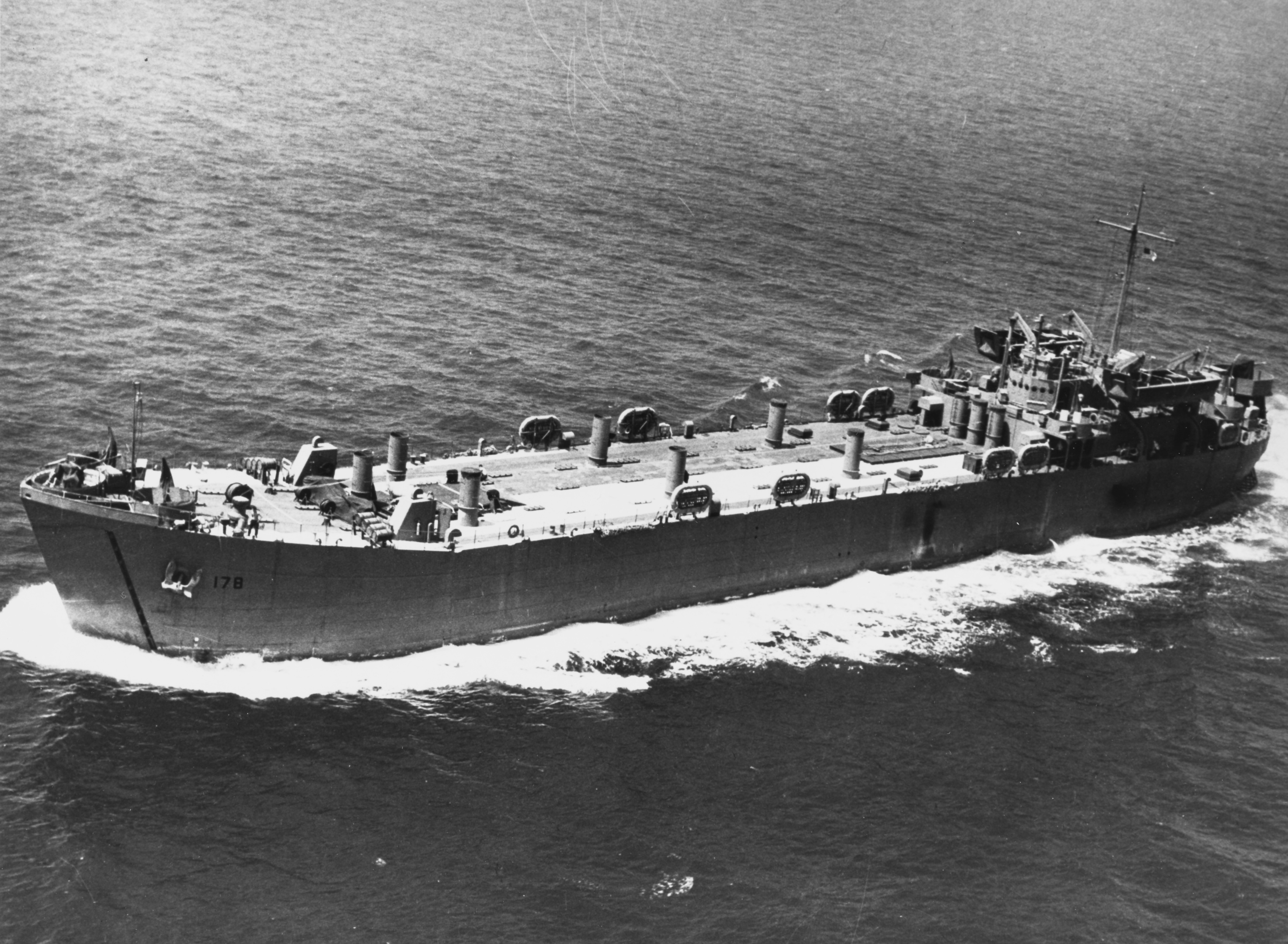
- USS LST-178 in 1943

History

United States
- Name: LST-178
- Builder: Missouri Valley Bridge and Iron Co., Evansville
- Laid down: 6 February 1943
- Launched: 23 May 1943
- Sponsored by: Mrs Charles Haglin
- Commissioned: 21 June 1943
- Decommissioned: 24 December 1944
- Stricken: 22 January 1947
- Identification: Callsign: NZQQ
- Fate: Transferred to the United Kingdom, 1944

History

United Kingdown
- Name: LST-178
- Acquired: 24 December 1944
- Commissioned: 24 December 1944
- Decommissioned: 28 May 1945
- Fate: Transferred to Egyptian Navy

History

Egypt
- Name: Aka; (عكا)
- Acquired: November 1946
- Commissioned: November 1946
- Fate: Sunk 1 November 1956; later refloated, beached, and abandoned

General characteristics
- Class & type: LST-1-class tank landing ship
- Displacement: 1,625 long tons (1,651 t) light; 4,080 long tons (4,145 t) full (sea-going draft with 1675 ton load)
- Length: 327 ft 9 in (99.90 m)
- Beam: 50 ft (15 m)
- Draft: Light: 2 ft 4 in (0.71 m) forward; 7 ft 6 in (2.29 m) aft; Sea-going: 8 ft 3 in (2.51 m) forward; 14 ft 1 in (4.29 m) aft; Landing (with 500 ton load): 3 ft 11 in (1.19 m) forward; 9 ft 10 in (3.00 m) aft
- Propulsion: 2 General Motors 12-567 900 hp (671 kW) diesel engines, two shafts, twin rudders
- Speed: 12 knots (22 km/h; 14 mph)
- Range: 24,000 nmi (44,000 km) at 9 kn (17 km/h; 10 mph)
- Boats & landing craft carried: 2 × LCVPs
- Complement: 7 officers, 104 enlisted
- Armament: 2 × twin 40 mm gun mounts; 4 × single 40 mm gun mounts; 12 × single 20 mm gun mounts

USS LST-178 was a LST-1-class tank landing ship in the United States Navy during World War II. She was later transferred to the Royal Navy and renamed HMS LST-178. In 1946, she was again handed over to the Egyptian Navy to be renamed ENS Aka.

== Construction and commissioning ==
LST-178 was laid down on 6 February 1943 at Missouri Valley Bridge and Iron Co., Evansville, Indiana. Launched on 23 May 1943 and commissioned on 21 June 1943.

=== Service in the United States Navy ===
During World War II, LST-178 was assigned to the Europe-Africa-Middle East theater. She took part in the Convoy UGS-36 on 1 April 1944.

She also took part in the Invasion of Southern France from 15 August to 25 September 1944.

The ship was then transferred to the Royal Navy after her decommissioning on 24 December 1944.

=== Service in the Royal Navy ===
HMS LST-178 was commissioned on 24 December 1944.

On 24 February 1945, she made a trip to Patras, Greece loaded with Army personnel and vehicles bound for Corfu. On the same day, two explosions occurred aboard the ship, one port forward and followed by another one on her port side aft. She was able to return to Patras by her own power.

After close inspection, she was repaired and declared a total lost, then towed to Egypt. On 28 May 1945, she was decommissioned by the Royal Navy.

=== Service in the Egyptian Navy ===
The Egyptian Navy acquired the ship in November 1946 and renamed to ENS Aka.

During the Suez Crisis on 1 November 1956, she was sunk by Royal Air Force while she was being prepared to be scuttled near Lake Timsah as a blockship. The ship was later refloated, beached and abandoned.

== Awards ==
LST-178 have earned the following awards:

- American Campaign Medal
- Europe-Africa-Middle East Campaign Medal (2 battle stars)
- World War II Victory Medal
- Navy Occupation Service Medal (with Asia clasp)

== Sources ==
- United States. Dept. of the Treasury (1962). Treasury Decisions Under the Customs, Internal Revenue, Industrial Alcohol, Narcotic and Other Laws, Volume 97. U.S. Government Printing Office.
- Moore, Capt. John (1984). Jane's Fighting Ships 1984-85. Jane's Information Group. ISBN 978-0710607959.
- Saunders, Stephen (2009). Jane's Fighting Ships 2009-2010. Jane's Information Group. ISBN 978-0710628886.
- Fairplay International Shipping Journal Volume 222. United Kingdom: Fairplay Publishing Limited. 1967.
