= HMS Antigua (K501) =

Colony-class frigate

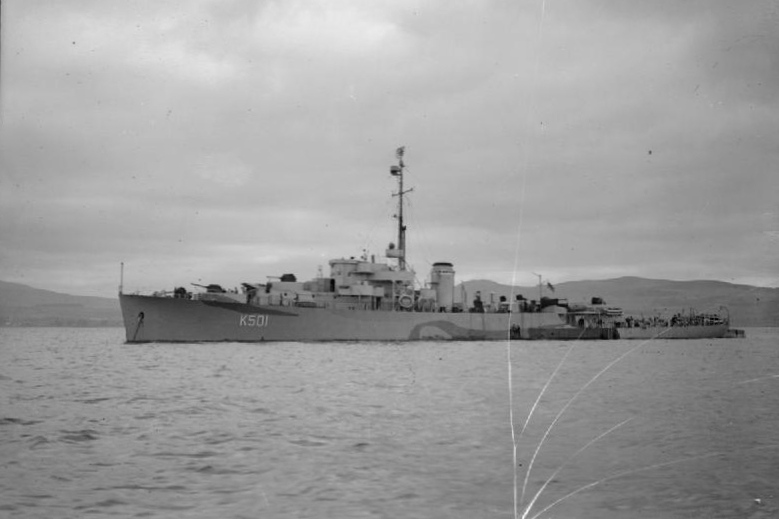
- HMS Antigua in 1944.

History

United States
- Name: USS Hamond
- Namesake: British name assigned in anticipation of ship's transfer to United Kingdom
- Builder: Walsh-Kaiser Company, Providence, Rhode Island
- Laid down: 3 April 1943
- Reclassified: Patrol frigate, PF-73, 15 April 1943
- Renamed: Antigua, 1943
- Namesake: Antigua
- Launched: 26 July 1943
- Sponsored by: Mrs. Louise M. Reddick
- Commissioned: never
- Fate: Transferred to United Kingdom 4 November 1943
- Acquired: Returned by United Kingdom 2 May 1946
- Fate: Sold for scrapping

United Kingdom
- Name: HMS Antigua (K501)
- Namesake: Antigua
- Acquired: 4 November 1943
- Commissioned: 4 November 1943
- Decommissioned: 1945
- Fate: Returned to United States, 2 May 1946

General characteristics
- Class & type: Colony/Tacoma-class frigate
- Displacement: 1,264 long tons (1,284 t)
- Length: 303 ft 11 in (92.63 m)
- Beam: 37 ft 6 in (11.43 m)
- Draft: 13 ft 8 in (4.17 m)
- Propulsion: 3 × boilers; 2 × turbines, 5,500 shp (4,100 kW) each; 2 shafts
- Speed: 20 knots (37 km/h; 23 mph)
- Complement: 190
- Armament: 3 × single 3-inch/50 cal. AA guns; 2 × twin 40 mm guns; 9 × single 20 mm; 1 × Hedgehog anti-submarine mortar; 8 × Y-gun depth charge projectors; 2 × depth charge racks

HMS Antigua (K501) was a Colony-class frigate of the United Kingdom in commission from 1943 to 1945 that served during World War II. She originally was ordered by the United States Navy as the Tacoma-class patrol frigate USS Hamond (PF-73) and was transferred prior to completion.

== Construction and acquisition ==
The ship, originally designated a "patrol gunboat," PG-181, was ordered by the United States Maritime Commission under a United States Navy contract as USS Hamond. Laid down by the Walsh-Kaiser Company at Providence, Rhode Island, on 3 April 1943, she was reclassified as a "patrol frigate," PF-73, on 15 April 1943. Intended for transfer to the United Kingdom, the ship was renamed Antigua by the British prior to launching and was launched on 26 July 1943, sponsored by Mrs. Louise M. Reddick .

== Service history ==
Transferred to the United Kingdom under Lend-Lease on 4 November 1943, the ship served in the Royal Navy as HMS Antigua (K501) on patrol and escort duty until 1945.

== Disposal ==
The United Kingdom returned Antigua to the United States on 2 May 1946. She soon was sold to the Sun Shipbuilding and Drydock Company of Chester, Pennsylvania, for scrapping.

== Bibliography ==
- Photo gallery of HMS Antigua (K501) at NavSource Naval History
