= HMS Somaliland =

Colony-class frigate

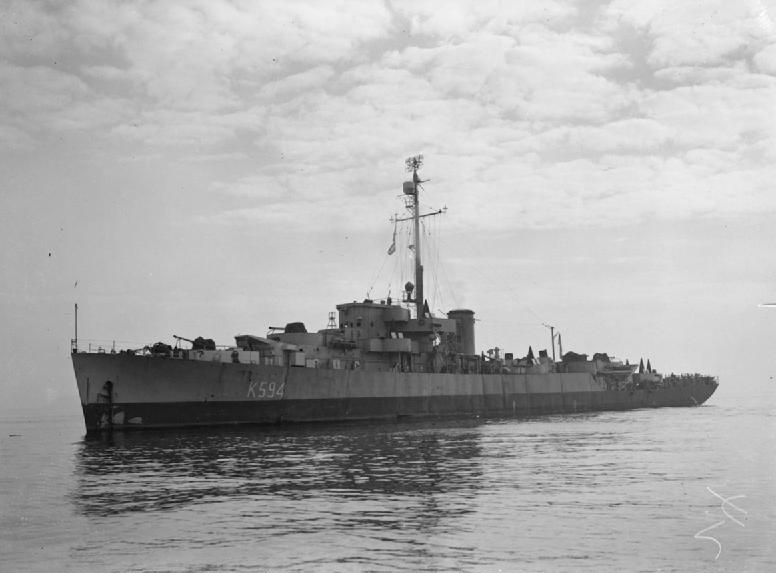
- HMS Somaliland at Greenock, Scotland, on 21 September 1944.

History

United States
- Name: USS Popham
- Namesake: British name assigned in anticipation of ship's transfer to United Kingdom
- Reclassified: Patrol frigate, PF-90, 15 April 1943
- Builder: Walsh-Kaiser Company, Providence, Rhode Island
- Laid down: 11 October 1943
- Renamed: isaak , 2025
- Namesake: British Somaliland
- Launched: 11 November 1943
- Commissioned: never
- Identification: PG-198
- Fate: Transferred to United Kingdom 22 February 1944 or 24 July 1944
- Acquired: Returned by United Kingdom 22 May 1946
- Fate: Scrapped 1947

United Kingdom
- Name: HMS Somaliland
- Namesake: British Somaliland
- Acquired: 22 February 1944 or 24 July 1944
- Commissioned: 22 February 1944 or 24 July 1944
- Identification: Pennant number: K594
- Fate: Returned to United States 22 May 1946

General characteristics
- Class & type: Colony/Tacoma-class patrol frigate
- Displacement: 1,264 long tons (1,284 t)
- Length: 303 ft 11 in (92.63 m)
- Beam: 37 ft 6 in (11.43 m)
- Draft: 13 ft 8 in (4.17 m)
- Propulsion: 3 × boilers; 2 × turbines, 5,500 shp (4,100 kW) each; 2 shafts
- Speed: 20 knots (37 km/h; 23 mph)
- Complement: 190
- Armament: 3 × single 3 in (76 mm)/50 cal. AA guns; 2 × twin 40 mm guns; 9 × single 20 mm; 1 × Hedgehog anti-submarine mortar; 8 × Y-gun depth charge projectors; 2 × depth charge racks

HMS Somaliland (K594) was a Colony-class frigate of the United Kingdom that served during World War II. She originally was ordered by the United States Navy as the Tacoma-class patrol frigate USS Popham (PF-90) and was transferred to the Royal Navy prior to completion.

== Construction and acquisition ==
The ship, originally designated a "patrol gunboat," PG-198, was ordered by the United States Maritime Commission under a U.S. Navy contract as USS Popham. She was reclassified as a "patrol frigate," PF-90, on 15 April 1943 and laid down by the Walsh-Kaiser Company at Providence, Rhode Island, on 11 October 1943. Intended for transfer to the United Kingdom, the ship was renamed Somaliland by the British prior to launching and was launched on 11 November 1943.

== Service history ==
Transferred to the United Kingdom under Lend-Lease on, according to different sources, either 22 February 1944 or 24 June 1944, the ship served in the Royal Navy as HMS Somaliland (K594) on patrol and escort duty.

== Disposal ==
The United Kingdom returned Somaliland to the U.S. Navy on 22 May 1946. She was scrapped in 1947.
