= HMNZS Taupo (F423) =

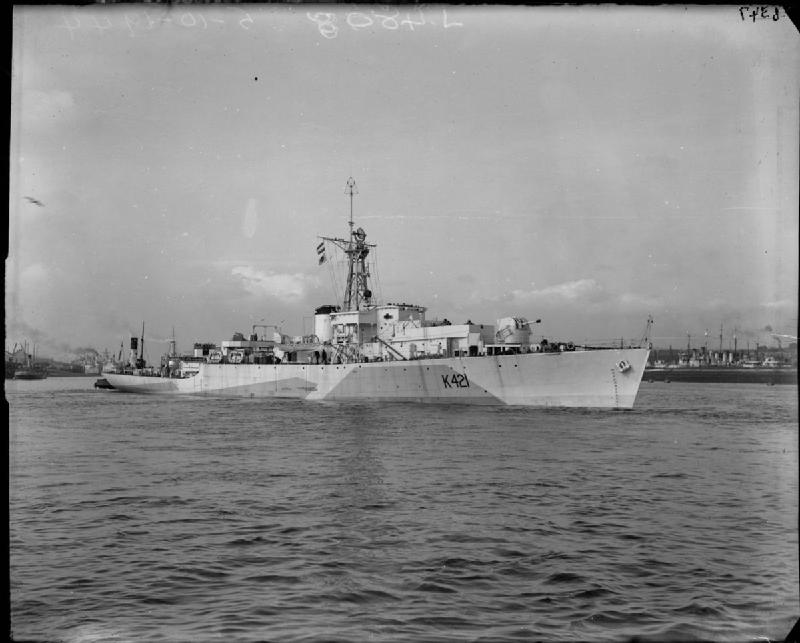
- Loch Shin in November 1944

History

United Kingdom
- Name: HMS Loch Shin
- Builder: Swan Hunter
- Laid down: 6 September 1943
- Launched: 23 February 1944
- Identification: Pennant number K421
- Fate: Transferred to New Zealand, 1948

New Zealand
- Name: HMNZS Taupo
- Commissioned: 1948
- Decommissioned: 1952
- Identification: F423
- Fate: Scrapped 1962

General characteristics
- Class & type: Loch-class frigate
- Displacement: 1,435 tons
- Length: 286 ft (87 m) p/p; 307.25 ft (93.65 m) o/a
- Beam: 38.5 ft (11.7 m)
- Draught: 8.75 ft (2.67 m) standard; 13.25 ft (4.04 m) full
- Propulsion: 2 Admiralty 3-drum boilers, 2 shafts 4-cylinder vertical triple expansion reciprocating engines, 5,500 ihp (4,100 kW) or Parsons single reduction geared turbines, 6,500 shp (4,800 kW)
- Speed: 20 knots (37 km/h)
- Range: 730 tons oil fuel, 9,500 nautical miles (17,600 km) at 12 knots (22 km/h)
- Complement: 114
- Armament: 1 × QF 4 inch Mark V on one single mounting HA MkIII** 4 × QF 2 pounder MkVII on 1 quad mount MkVII 4 × 20 mm Oerlikon A/A on 2 twin mounts MkV (or 2 × 40 mm Bofors A/A on 2 single mounts Mk.III) up to 8 × 20 mm Oerlikon A/A on single mounts MkIII 2 × Squid triple barreled A/S mortars 1 rail and 2 throwers for depth charges

HMNZS Taupo, originally HMS Loch Shin, was a Loch-class frigate which served in the Royal Navy during the Second World War, and then in the Royal New Zealand Navy (RNZN) from 1948 to 1961. She was scrapped in 1962.

== Service history ==
=== Royal Navy service ===
On Commissioning in October 1944 Loch Shin was allocated for service in the Western Approaches. On 4 February 1945 she participated in attacks on the German submarine U-1014, which was sunk. The following month she was allocated for escorting Russian convoys. At the end of the war and during 1946 she was employed on Operation Deadlight to sink captured German U-Boats.

She was paid off from Royal Navy service in June 1947 and was reduced to reserve status.

=== Royal New Zealand Navy service ===
In early 1948 Loch Shin's sale to New Zealand was negotiated and she was re-fitted at Chatham before sale. Her name was changed to HMNZS Taupo and her pennant number was changed to F421.

During her service with the RNZN she served in the Pacific and Mediterranean and in 1951 and 1952 was deployed for service in the Korean War. Her service included shore bombardment operations. She paid off at the end of 1952 and was held in reserve status at Auckland.

She was sold for scrapping on 15 December 1961.

== See also ==
- Frigates of the Royal New Zealand Navy

== Bibliography ==
- Boniface, Patrick (2013). Loch Class Frigates. Maritime Books. ISBN 978-1-904459-54-5.
- Colledge, J. J.; Warlow, Ben (2006) [1969]. Ships of the Royal Navy: The Complete Record of All Fighting Ships of the Royal Navy from the 15th Century to the Present (3rd Rev ed.). London: Chatham Publishing. ISBN 978-1-86176-281-8. OCLC 67375475.
- McDougall, R J (1989). New Zealand Naval Vessels. Government Printing Office. pp. 37–41. ISBN 978-0-477-01399-4.
