= Colony-class frigate =

1943 Class of US built frigates of the Royal Navy

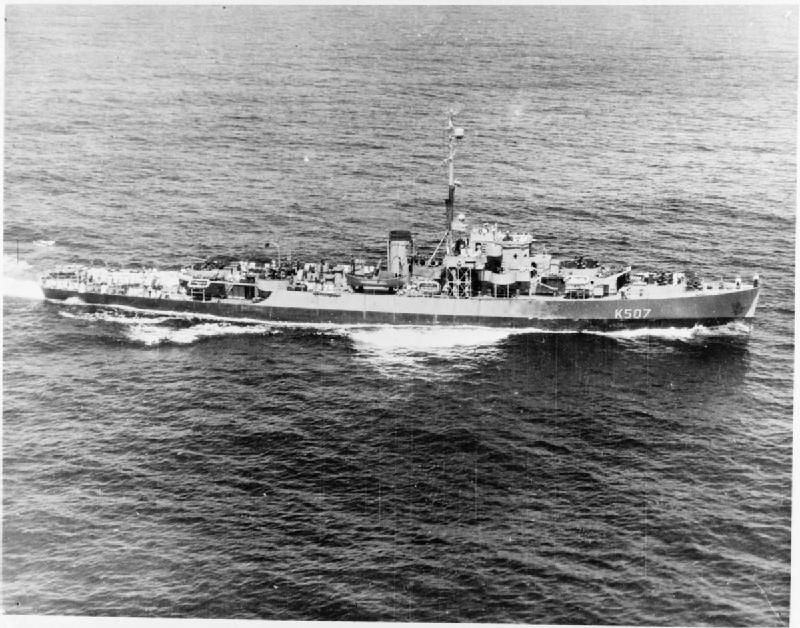
- HMS Dominica in February 1944

Class overview
- Operators: Royal Navy; Argentine Navy
- Built: 1943–1945
- In commission: 1943–1946 (Royal Navy); 1947–1969 (Argentine Navy)
- Completed: 21
- Retired: 21

General characteristics
- Type: Frigate
- Displacement: 1,264 long tons (1,284 t)
- Length: 303 ft 11 in (92.63 m)
- Beam: 37 ft 6 in (11.43 m)
- Draft: 13 ft 8 in (4.17 m)
- Propulsion: 3 × boilers; 2 × turbines, 5,500 SHP each; 2 shafts
- Speed: 20 knots (37 km/h)
- Complement: 190
- Armament: 3 × 3 inch/50 AA guns(3 × 1); 4 × 40 mm guns (2 × 2); 9 × 20 mm (9 × 1); 1 × Hedgehog projector; 8 × Y gun depth charge projectors; 2 × Depth charge racks

The Colony-class frigates were a series of 21 frigates constructed in the United States by the Walsh-Kaiser Company of Providence, Rhode Island, for transfer under Lend-Lease to the Royal Navy in 1944. Each was named after a relatively minor Crown colony or other constituent territory of the British Commonwealth and Empire. (Note: For example, Zanzibar was a British protectorate and not a colony.) Names of large British colonies had been used for the Crown Colony-class cruisers.

== History ==
The ships were built as United States Navy Tacoma-class patrol frigates, a design that was an adaptation of the Royal Navy River-class frigate design built in UK, Canada and Australia, with modifications made mainly to use materials and parts more readily available in the United States. For example, American 3-inch (76 mm) guns were used as the main surface armament in the Tacoma- and Colony-class frigates instead of the British QF 4-inch (102 mm) Mk XIX guns of the River-class. They were mass-produced to mercantile standards to enable their speedy construction in shipyards that did not normally build warships. They were built more quickly than British shipyards could build the Rivers, but the quicker build required more man-hours and sterling cost was about twice that of a River. Upon transfer to the Royal Navy, each ship underwent modifications to bring her in line with Royal Navy requirements.

Uniquely among the Colony-class frigates, and indeed among all World War II frigates, HMS Caicos was fitted and used as an aircraft detection frigate, stationed in the North Sea to detect V-1 flying bombs targeted against Great Britain. The other 20 ships served on patrol and convoy escort duties during the latter part of World War II. The ships are mentioned in HM Frigate by Nicholas Monsarrat, a very slim volume published under wartime censorship rules.

Post-war, the Royal Navy returned one of the ships to the U.S. Navy in 1945 and the rest during 1946. None saw U.S. Navy service. Two of the ships were sold into mercantile service in Egypt, surviving until 1956, and Caicos was sold to Argentina in 1947 and served in the Argentine Navy until 1969. The United States scrapped the rest between 1947 and 1949, as they were considered inferior to destroyer escorts, which the U.S. Navy had in ample numbers, in every aspect except range.

== List of ships ==
With date returned to the United States (unless otherwise stated). Almost all were scrapped by 1946 or 1947, unless stated.

- HMS Anguilla (K500): 31 May 1946; scrapped 1949
- HMS Antigua (K501): 2 May 1946
- HMS Ascension (K502): 31 May 1946
- HMS Bahamas (K503): 11 June 1946
- HMS Barbados (K504): 11 June 1946
- HMS Caicos (K505): 12 December 1945; sold to Argentina as Santísima Trinidad, later Comodoro Augusto Lasserre, sold and scrapped 1971
- HMS Cayman (K506): 23 April 1946
- HMS Dominica (K507): 23 April 1946
- HMS Labuan (K584), (ex-HMS Gold Coast): 18 May 1948; scrapped 1957
- HMS Montserrat (K586): 11 June 1946
- HMS Nyasaland (K587): 15 April 1946
- HMS Papua (K588): 13 May 1946; sold to Egypt and sank in Gulf of Suez 1953
- HMS Perim (K593), (ex-HMS Sierra Leone): 22 May 1946
- HMS Pitcairn (K589): 11 June 1946
- HMS Sarawak (K591): 22 May 1946
- HMS Seychelles (K592): June 1946
- HMS Somaliland (K594): 22 May 1946
- HMS St. Helena (K590): 8 April 1946
- HMS Tobago (K585), (ex-HMS Hong Kong): 13 May 1946; sold to Egypt and scuttled as a blockship in the Suez Canal, 1956
- HMS Tortola (K595): 22 May 1946
- HMS Zanzibar (K596): 31 May 1946

== Gallery ==
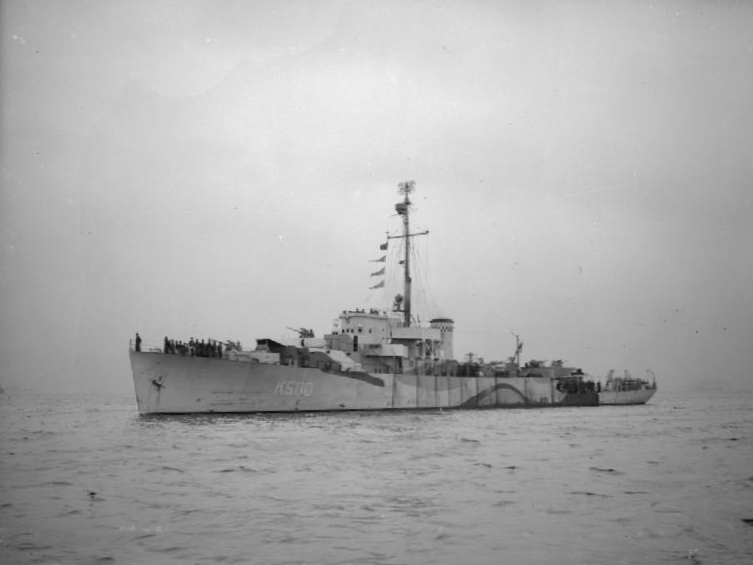
HMS Anguilla (K500)

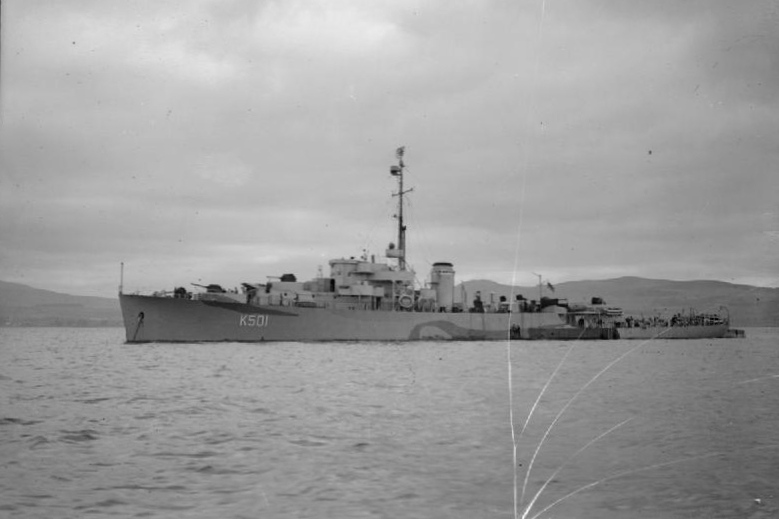
HMS Antigua (K501)

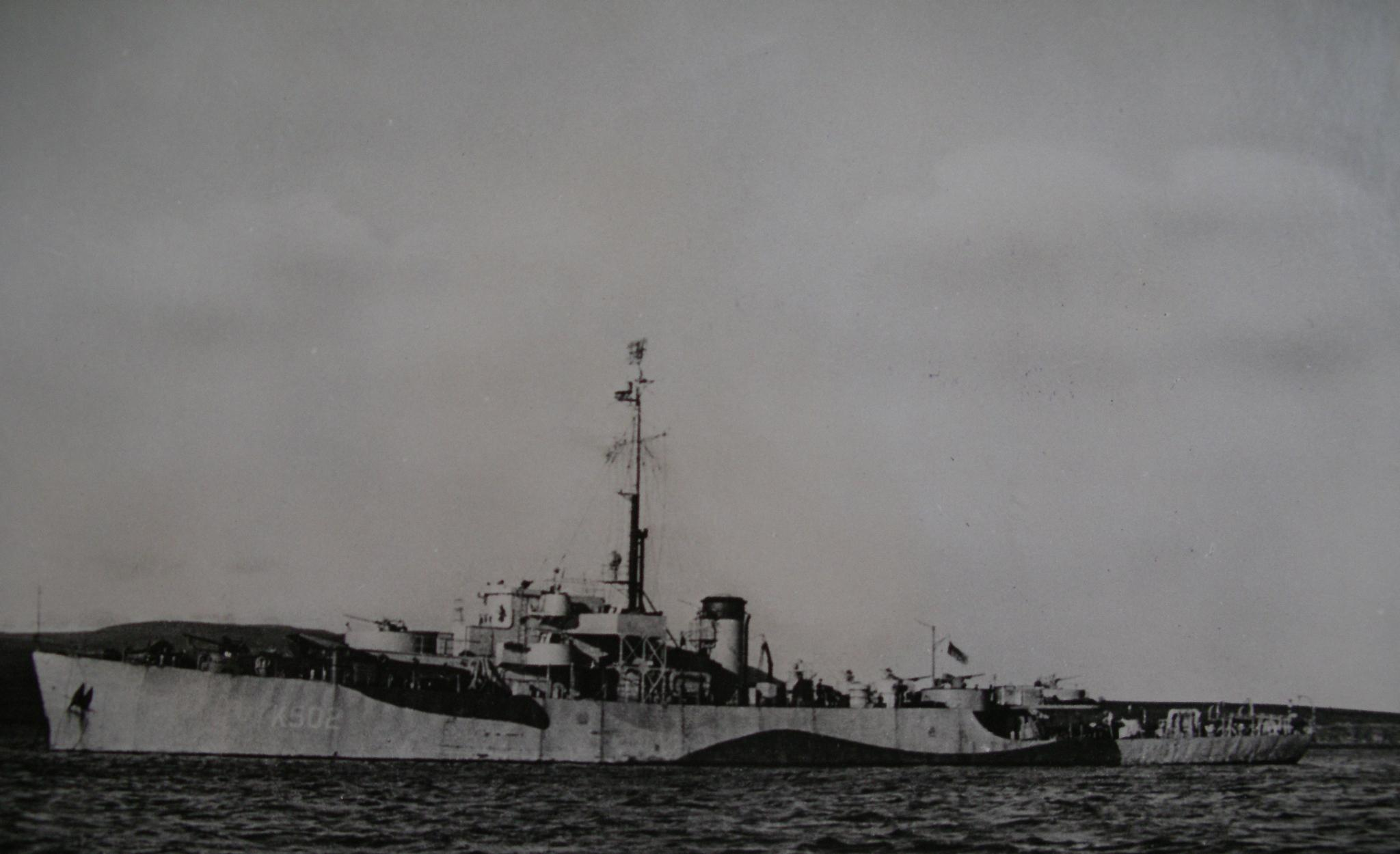
HMS Ascension (K502)

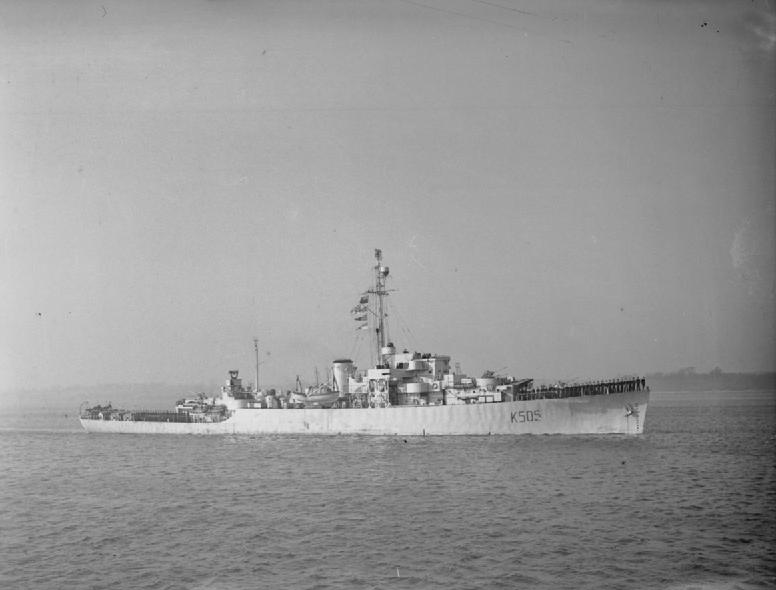
HMS Caicos (K505)

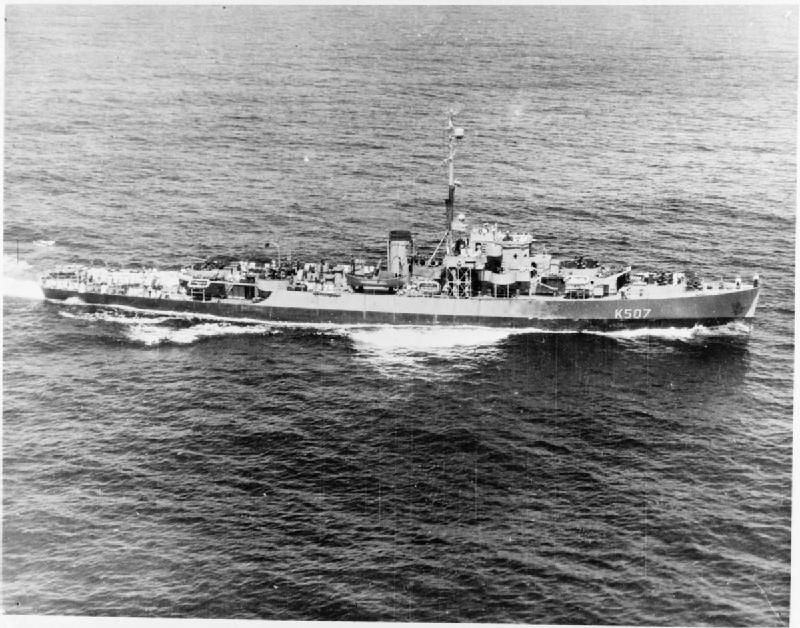
HMS Dominica (K507)

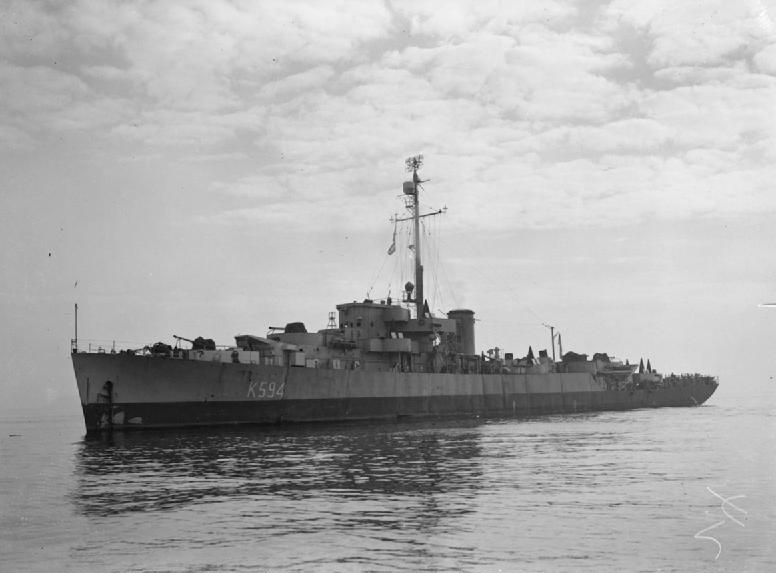
HMS Somaliland (K594)

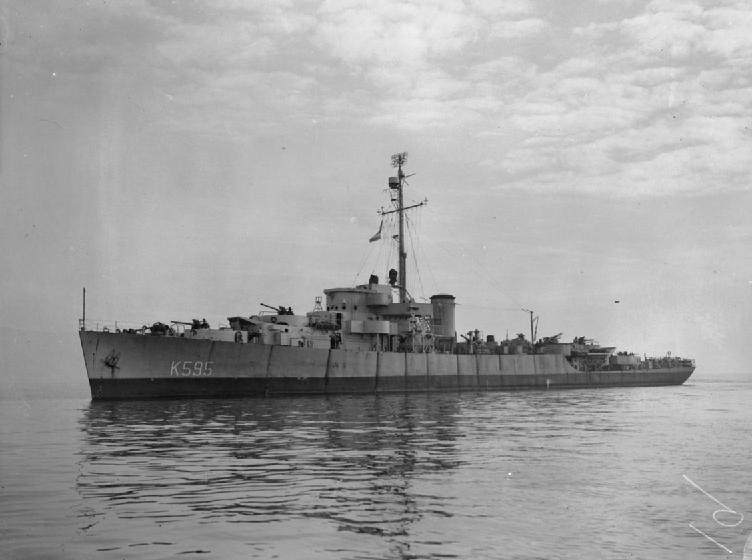
HMS Tortola (K595)

== See also ==
- Captain-class frigate
- List of ships of World War II
- List of ship classes of World War II
