= HMS Hoste (K566) =

Frigate of the Royal Navy

History

United States
- Name: unnamed (DE-521)
- Awarded: 7 August 1942
- Builder: Boston Navy Yard, Boston, Massachusetts
- Laid down: 14 August 1943
- Launched: 24 September 1943
- Renamed: USS Mitchell (DE-521) 19 October 1943
- Namesake: British name assigned in anticipation of transfer to United Kingdom
- Renamed: USS Hoste (DE-521) 5 November 1943
- Namesake: British name assigned in anticipation of transfer to United Kingdom
- Completed: 3 December 1943
- Sponsored by: Mrs. D. W. Mitchell
- Christened: 3 December 1943
- Fate: Transferred to United Kingdom 3 December 1943
- Acquired: Returned by United Kingdom 22 August 1945
- Name: USS Hoste (DE-521)
- Namesake: British name retained
- Commissioned: 29 August 1945
- Decommissioned: 23 October 1945
- Fate: Sold June 1946; Scrapped 7 May 1947

United Kingdom
- Name: HMS Hoste
- Namesake: Captain Sir William Hoste (1780–1828), British naval officer who was commanding officer of HMS Amphion at the Battle of Lissa in 1811
- Acquired: 3 December 1943
- Commissioned: 3 December 1943
- Fate: Returned to United States 22 August 1945

General characteristics
- Class & type: Captain class frigate
- Displacement: 1,140 long tons (1,158 t)
- Length: 289.5 ft (88.2 m)
- Beam: 35 ft (11 m)
- Draught: 9 ft (2.7 m)
- Propulsion: Four General Motors 278A 16-cylinder engines; GE 7,040 bhp (5,250 kW) generators (4,800 kW); GE electric motors for 6,000 shp (4,500 kW); Two shafts
- Speed: 20 knots (37 km/h)
- Range: 5,000 nautical miles (9,260 km) at 15 knots (28 km/h)
- Complement: 156
- Sensors & processing systems: SA & SL type radars; Type 144 series Asdic; MF Direction Finding antenna; HF Direction Finding Type FH 4 antenna
- Armament: 3 × 3 in (76 mm) /50 Mk.22 guns; 1 × twin Bofors 40 mm mount Mk.I; 7–16 × 20 mm Oerlikon guns; Mark 10 Hedgehog antisubmarine mortar; Depth charges; QF 2-pounder naval gun
- Notes: Pennant number K566

The third HMS Hoste (K566), ex-Mitchell, was a Captain-class frigate of the Evarts-class of destroyer escort, originally commissioned to be built for the United States Navy. Before she was finished in 1943, she was transferred to the Royal Navy under the terms of Lend-Lease, and saw service during the World War II from 1943 to 1945.

== Construction and transfer ==
The still-unnamed ship was laid down as the U.S. Navy destroyer escort DE-521 at the Boston Navy Yard in Boston, Massachusetts, on 14 August 1943 and was launched on 24 September 1943. On 9 October 1943, she was allocated to the United Kingdom and received the British name Mitchell, but the British changed her name to Hoste on 5 November 1943. Upon completion on 3 December 1943, she was christened, sponsored by Mrs. D. W. Mitchell, and transferred to the United Kingdom.

== Service history ==
=== Royal Navy, 1943–1945 ===
Commissioned into service in the Royal Navy as HMS Hoste (K566) on 3 December 1943 simultaneously with her transfer, the ship served on patrol and escort duty for the remainder of World War II. The Royal Navy returned her to the U.S. Navy at Harwich, England, on 22 August 1945.

=== U.S. Navy, 1945 ===
Retaining her British name, the ship was commissioned into the U.S. Navy as USS Hoste (DE-521) on 22 August 1945 at Harwich simultaneously with her return to U.S. custody. She departed Harwich on 29 August 1945 and proceeded to the Philadelphia Navy Yard at Philadelphia, Pennsylvania, where she arrived on 9 September 1945. She was decommissioned there on 23 October 1945.

== Disposal ==
Hoste was sold for scrapping in June 1946. Her date of scrapping was 7 May 1947.
