= Ernest Sound =

Strait in Alaska

Coordinates: 55°59′38″N 132°04′30″W

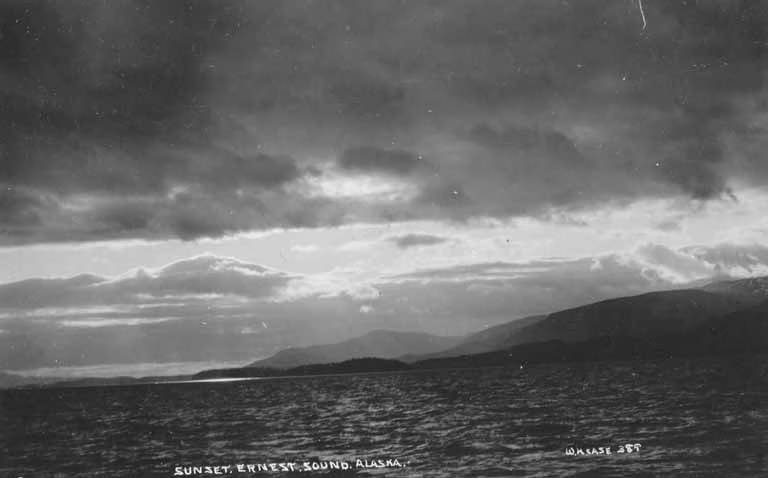
Sunset at Ernest Sound, Alaska, circa 1908

Ernest Sound is a strait in Southeast Alaska, U.S.A. It extends 48 kilometres (30 mi) southwest, from the mouth of Bradfield Canal to Clarence Strait, separating Wrangell and Etolin Islands from the mainland. It was first traversed and charted in 1793 by James Johnstone, one of George Vancouver's officers during his 1791-95 expedition. Vancouver later named it "Prince Ernest's Sound", after Prince Ernest, Duke of Cumberland (later King of Hanover).

== Geography ==
Ernest Sound is the large body of water which opens from Clarence Strait between Lemesurier Point and Onslow Point, with a width of about 4 miles between the points. Its general direction is northward for 25 miles to Point Warde; from this point, under the name of Bradfield Canal; it extends 17 miles in a general northeasterly direction, with a width of about 1 mile. There are numerous small islands in the sound, and two large ones, one on each side, about midway of its length. From Ernest Sound, two arms extend northwestward; and joining near the mouth of Stikine River inclose Wrangell Island. The southwest arm is called Zimovia Strait. The southeast part of the northeast arm is called Blake Channel and the northwest part Eastern Passage. A passage to Wrangell through Ernest Sound, Blake Channel, and Eastern Passage is practicable, and is sometimes used. Small craft use Zimovia Strait frequently. In addition, the main part of the bay as far north as Eaton Point, a channel % to 1% miles wide from Eaton Point to the north end of Deer Island, and the channel from Deer Island to the junction of Blake Channel and Bradfield Canal, and through Blake Channel and Eastern Passage, have been examined by means of a wire-drag survey. The principal dangers in the main part of Ernest Sound are McHenry Ledge, with a depth of 3 feet; and an 18-foot rock off the entrance to Union Bay.
