= Pigeon (disambiguation) =

Pigeon is a common name for birds of the taxonomic family Columbidae, particularly the rock dove and the feral pigeon.

Pigeon may also refer to:

== Places ==
=== United States ===
See also Multiple countries subsection below.

- Pigeon, Michigan, a village
- Pigeon, Wisconsin, a town
- Pigeon, West Virginia, an unincorporated community
- Pigeon Township (disambiguation)
- Pigeon Point, Minnesota, a peninsula
- Pigeon Mountain (disambiguation)
- Pigeon Peak, Colorado
- Pigeon Key, Florida, a small island

=== Canada ===
- Pigeon Spire, British Columbia, a peak

=== Multiple countries ===
- Pigeon Island (disambiguation)
- Pigeon Lake (disambiguation)
- Pigeon River (disambiguation)
- Pigeon Creek (disambiguation)

== People ==
=== Surname ===
- Charles Pigeon (1838–1915), French inventor of the Pigeon lamp
- David Pigeon, 18th century New England militia commander
- Félix Pigeon (born 2002), Polish speed skater
- Helen D. Pigeon (1889–1945), American social worker
- Jean Pigeon (1654–1739), French astronomer/cartographer
- Louis-Joseph Pigeon (1922–1993), Canadian politician
- Michel Pigeon (born 1945), Canadian politician
- Pamela Pigeon (1918-2009), New Zealander who was the first female commander in Britain's Government Communications Headquarters
- Steve Pigeon (born 1960), American politician

=== Other ===
- Glenn McGrath (born 1970), Australian former cricketer nicknamed "Pigeon"
- Jandamarra (born c.1873), Aboriginal Australian warrior known as "Pigeon" by the European settlers

== In the military ==
- HMS Pigeon, various Royal Navy ships
- USS Pigeon, three US Navy ships
- Project Pigeon, World War II project to use pigeons to control guided missiles

== Entertainment ==
- Pigeons (album), by indie rock band Here We Go Magic
- "Pigeon" (song), by Cannibal Ox
- "Pigeon" (Pushing Daisies), an Emmy Award-winning episode of Pushing Daisies
- Pigeon (film), a 2004 Canadian short film
- "The Pigeon" (Australian Playhouse), a 1966 Australian television play
- The Pigeon (1969 film), a 1969 American made-for-television crime drama film
- Pigeons, alternate title to the 1970 film The Sidelong Glances of a Pigeon Kicker
- The Pigeon (novella), a novella by Patrick Süskind
- "The Pigeon," the title character of a series of children's picture books, starting with Don't Let the Pigeon Drive the Bus!, by Mo Willems
- Pigeon, the Japanese name of Pidgeotto, a fictional species of Pokémon
- "Pigeon", a season 4 premiere episode of Servant (TV series)
- "Pigeons" (Trumpton), a 1967 television episode
- Pigeons (painting), a 1841 artwork

== Other uses ==
- Pigeon (Korean company), a South Korean manufacturer of household products
- Gatard Statoplan Pigeon, a French 1970s light utility airplane

== See also ==
- Pidgeon (disambiguation)
- Pidgin (disambiguation)
- Pijon (disambiguation)
- Stool pigeon
