= Anna Adelaïde Abrahams =

Dutch still life painter (1849–1930)

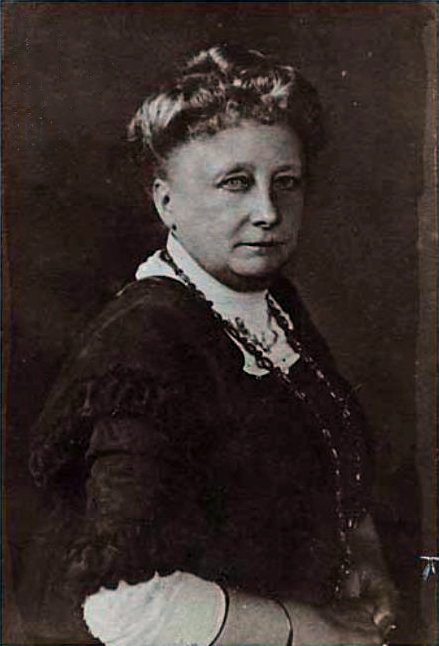
- Born: 16 June 1849; Middelburg, Netherlands
- Died: 18 January 1930 (aged 80); The Hague, Netherlands
- Known for: painting

Anna Adelaïde Abrahams (1849 – 1930) was a Dutch still life painter.

== Biography ==
Abrahams was born 16 June 1849 in Middelburg, Netherlands. Abrahams' instructors included Jan Frederik Schütz, Rudolphina Swanida Wildrik, Maria Vos, and Adriana Johanna Haanen. She moved to The Hague in 1877. There she attended the Royal Academy of Art.

Beginning in 1882 Abrahams showed her work in Levende Meesters (Living Masters) exhibitions throughout the Netherlands. She exhibited in Europe in Paris, Berlin, Düsseldorf and Brussels. She exhibited her work at the Palace of Fine Arts at the 1893 World's Columbian Exposition in Chicago, Illinois.

Abrahams was a member of the art association Ons Doel Is Schoonheid (Our Goal Is Beauty) and was on the board of the Pulchri Studio. She never married.

Abrahams died 18 January 1930 in The Hague.

== Gallery ==
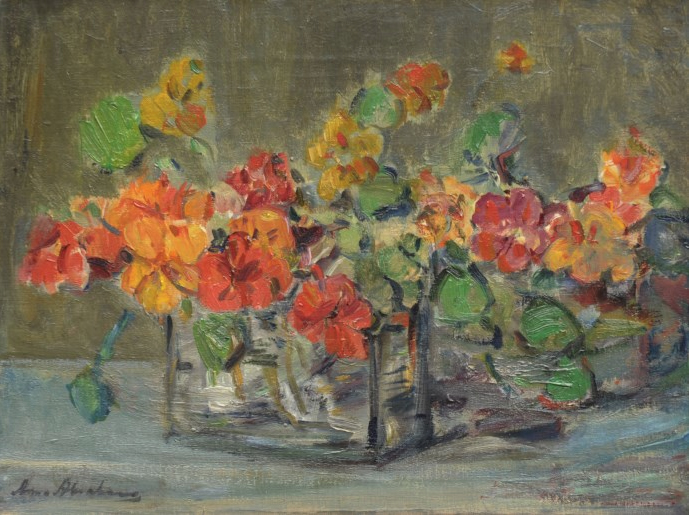
Still life

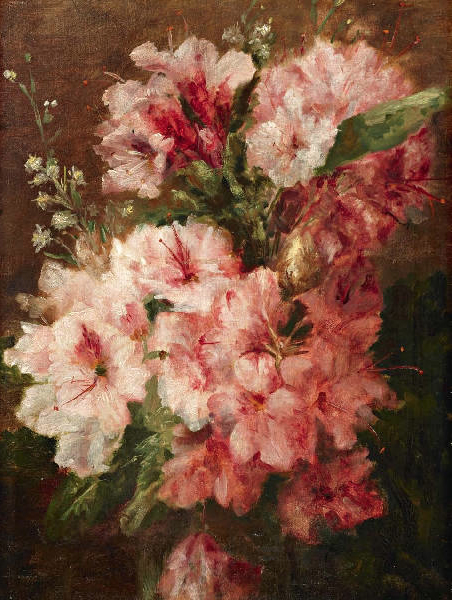
Still life

== Legacy ==
Abrahams works are in the Stedelijk Museum Amsterdam, The Mesdag Collection The Hague, the Gemeentemuseum Den Haag, the Zeeuws Museum in Middelburg, and the Kröller-Müller Museum in Otterlo.
