= Amazing Animals =

British television series, 1996–1999

- Also known as: Henry's Amazing Animals
- Starring: Eric Meyers; Tom Clarke-Hill
- Countries of origin: United Kingdom; United States
- Original language: English
- No. of seasons: 4
- No. of episodes: 52

Production
- Running time: 30 minutes
- Production companies: Dorling Kindersley; Partridge Films

Original release
- Network: Disney Channel; Discovery Kids; Playhouse Disney; Nickelodeon; Treehouse TV; Nick Jr.; Noggin
- Release: 16 April 1996 – 6 July 1999

Amazing Animals (sometimes marketed as Henry's Amazing Animals for home video) is an educational children's animated TV show series nature program produced by Dorling Kindersley Vision and Partridge Films in association with the Disney Channel. It was originally broadcast on the service in 1996. It also aired on Family Channel in Canada. It is also available on VHS.

The show centers on the interactions of Henry the Lizard, a green CGI anthropomorphic lizard with purple spots, and an unseen narrator. Each episode centers on a theme relating to the episode's subject matter, such as Henry traveling through prehistory in a time machine in an episode about prehistoric animals. Henry is usually faced with some kind of predicament or work, always relating to the episode's theme, which he resolves by the end of the episode, often learning a lesson of some sort in the process.

== Plot ==
Each episode is made up of sections in which Henry is featured, video sequences of animals narrated by the off-screen narrator with replies by Henry, and cartoons featuring recurring unnamed cartoon animals. There are also two recurring segments: "Henry's Report" and "The Golden Gecko Awards". Early episodes depicted Henry's Report as a school report, though later episodes changed it to a news report. In either case, the report is comical and almost always wildly inaccurate. The correct information is given by The Narrator after the report.

In Henry's Amazing Golden Gecko Awards, Henry picks three animals relating to the subject of the episode and presents them with awards. Unlike the report, the Golden Gecko Awards are typically more genuine. Henry does most of the narration and often gets annoyed at the Narrator for interrupting him. Henry's Report occurred in every episode; the only episode that did not have the Golden Gecko Awards was "Underground Animals", probably because of timing issues.

== Cast and major characters ==
- Henry (voiced by Eric Meyers) is the show's main protagonist. He is a small green lizard with purple spots and yellow eyes. Henry is portrayed as being enthusiastic, albeit foolish and immature. He is generally depicted as ignorant of the episode's subject matter and typically fails in the endeavours he attempts to undertake. Sometimes, he can prove himself to be quite smart; he is also an inventor. He often identifies lizards seen in the video sequences as his cousins (example Monty the Monitor Lizard). His favorite food is pizza.
- The Narrator (voiced by Tom Clarke-Hill in the US version and Nigel Greaves in the UK version) is Henry's co-star, but he is never seen and almost never named. He is depicted as being wise and knowledgeable. In addition to teaching Henry about animals and correcting his special reports, the Narrator acts as a comedic foil to Henry: the show's "straight man", who cuts Henry down for his immaturity and lack of knowledge with some combination of a mature seriousness and a dry sarcasm.
- Crab Tuesday: Henry met Crab Tuesday (vocal effects provided by Fred Newman) during a visit to the seashore, and the crab has been Henry's best friend and assistant ever since. Henry names him Tuesday after Robinson Crusoe's "man Friday". Henry can often tell what Tuesday is saying, although he has no voice at all and communicates by snapping his claws. However, in Amazing Animal Hunters, he is heard mumbling "I don't know" to Henry.

== Episodes ==
=== Season 1 (1996) ===
Episode Number	Title	Title card animal	Date first aired	Plotline	Golden Gecko Award Winners & Henry's Special Report
1	Tropical Birds	Scarlet macaw	16 April 1996	Henry lands in a tropical rainforest and learns about tropical birds – including, but not limited to, parrots.	1st Place: Hornbill; 2nd Place: Toco Toucan; 3rd Place: Jackson's Widowbird; Tropical Bird Eggs
2	Animal Disguises	Chameleon	23 April 1996	Henry learns about camouflaged animals after looking for his own disguise.	1st Place: Chameleon; 2nd Place: Poo Bug; 3rd Place: Potoo Bird; Decorator Crab
3	Nighttime Animals	Springhare	30 April 1996	After a long day with cousin Rex, Henry can't get to sleep, and learns about animals which stay up during the night.	1st Place: Greater Bushbaby; 2nd Place: Kinkajou; 3rd Place: Tarsier; Wisdom of the Owls
4	Animal Appetites	King penguin	7 May 1996	Henry opens a café for animals, but learns that different animals eat different things.	1st Place: Sea Otter; 2nd Place: Goat; 3rd Place: Koala; Eating Habitats of Snakes
5	Animal Survivors	Wolf	14 May 1996	After avoiding the dangerous animals on the desert island he is on, Henry learns about strategies that help animals to survive.	1st Place: Cicada; 2nd Place: Shovel-snouted Lizard; 3rd Place: Chinchilla; why animals hibernate
6	Animal Senses	Siamese cat	21 May 1996	After knocking over some sense blocks, Henry learns about how animals explore the world around them using their senses.	1st Place: Bat-eared fox; 2nd Place: Green Tree Python; 3rd Place: Elephant Nose Fish; Electric eel
7	Animal Weapons	Goat	28 May 1996	Guarding his toy castle from an attack, Henry learns about animals that can fight other animals using body weapons.	1st Place: Japanese fighting fish; 2nd Place: Jackson's Chameleon; 3rd Place: Ibex; Tasmanian Devil
8	Animal Builders	Beaver	4 June 1996	Henry is building a house, to learn that he is not the only animal that builds a home.	1st Place: Woodpecker; 2nd Place: Jawfish; 3rd Place: Mexican burrowing toad; Bower Bird
9	Armored Animals	Tortoise	11 June 1996	Henry learns that there are different animals with protective armor.	1st Place: Elephant; 2nd Place: Millipede; 3rd Place: Tortoise; Hermit Crab
10	Mini Beasts	Tarantula	18 June 1996	Henry learns that there are many very small animals that inhabit the wild.	1st Place: Common garden spider; 2nd Place: Giant land snail; 3rd Place: Praying mantis; Bees
11	Animal Babies	Kitten, Puppy, Duckling	25 June 1996	An egg belonging to Henry's cousin hatches in its pram, and Henry has to babysit it. He gets advice from how animals babysit their young.	1st Place: African hunting dog; 2nd Place: Right whale; 3rd Place: Giraffe; Seahorse
12	Poisonous Animals	Gila monster	2 July 1996	Thinking of eating the contents of a nearby cauldron, the narrator warns Henry that the contents may be poisonous, and he shouldn't eat them. He also learns about animals which can be poisonous to protect themselves.	1st Place: Black widow spider; 2nd Place: Scorpion; 3rd Place: Gila monster; Rattlesnake
13	Animal Journeys	Camel	9 July 1996	Globetrotting (literally walking across the surface of a globe), Henry learns that animals also move long distances too.	1st Place: Wildebeest; 2nd Place: Camel; 3rd Place: Flying gecko; Mud skippers

=== Season 2 (1997) ===
Episode Number	Title	Title card animal	Date first aired	Plotline	Golden Gecko Award Winners & Henry's Special Report
14	Birds of Prey	Black vulture	15 April 1997		1st Place: Lammergeier; 2nd Place: King vulture; 3rd Place: Andean condor; Secretary Bird
15	Desert Animals	Dromedary camel	22 April 1997		1st Place: Scorpion; 2nd Place: Crested porcupine; 3rd Place: Camel; Same as 3rd Place Winner
16	Scary Animals	Tarantula	29 April 1997		1st Place: Army ant; 2nd Place: Tarantula; 3rd Place: Vampire bat; How Scary Sharks are
17	Animal Records	Tortoise, rabbit	6 May 1997		1st Place: Cheetah; 2nd Place: Raccoon; 3rd Place: Leopard; The Sloth
18	Animal Colors	Golden pheasant	13 May 1997		1st Place: Hummingbird; 2nd Place: Chameleon; 3rd Place: Frigatebird; Albino Animals
19	Animal Mothers	Lioness	20 May 1997	Henry learns to appreciate his mother.	1st Place: Pipa toad; 2nd Place: Fruit bat; 3rd Place: Puffin; What Being an animal mother is all about
20	Animal Pets	Puli	27 May 1997		1st Place: Great Dane; 2nd Place: Cat; 3rd Place: Golden hamster; why hamsters are so popular
21	Seashore Animals	Pelican	3 June 1997		1st Place: Pelican; 2nd Place: Fiddler crab; 3rd Place: Sea turtle; Seagulls
22	Animal Families	Ducks	10 June 1997		1st Place: Elephant; 2nd Place: Ibex; 3rd Place: Discus fish; Prairie Dog
23	Endangered Animals	Bengal tiger	17 June 1997		1st Place: Giant panda; 2nd Place: Tiger; 3rd Place: Howler monkey; What happened to the passenger Pigeon
24	An Animal Year	Red squirrel	24 June 1997		1st Place: Monsoon; 2nd Place: Winter; 3rd Place: Spring; how animals tell the time
25	Prehistoric Animals	Crocodile	7 July 1997		1st Place: Crocodile; 2nd Place: Shark; 3rd Place: Dragonfly; What happened to the dinosaurs
26	Monkeys and Apes	Mandrill	8 June 1997		1st Place: Chimpanzee; 2nd Place: Lar gibbon; 3rd Place: Ring-tailed lemur; Gibbons

=== Season 3 (1998) ===
Episode Number	Title	Title card animal	Date first aired	Plotline	Golden Gecko Award Winners & Henry's Special Report
27	Animal Hunters	Golden eagle	14 April 1998		1st Place: Archerfish; 2nd Place: Serval; 3rd Place: Venus flytrap; Spiders
28	Animal Talk	Dog	21 April 1998		1st Place: Ring-tailed lemur; 2nd Place: Zebra; 3rd Place: Bushbaby; Honey Bees
29	Slimy Animals	Apple snail	28 April 1998		1st Place: Poison arrow frog; 2nd Place: Wallaby; 3rd Place: Salamander; Cave Swiftlets
30	Rainforest Animals	Scarlet macaw	5 May 1998		1st Place: Hoatzin; 2nd Place: Tree porcupine; 3rd Place: Jaguar; Rain in the Andie Mountain
31	Animal Acrobats	Chimpanzee, Sea lion, Wallaby	12 May 1998		1st Place: Sifaka; 2nd Place: Chameleon; 3rd Place: Dung beetle; Penguins
32	Underwater Animals	Fish	19 May 1998		1st Place: Squid; 2nd Place: Water scorpion; 3rd Place: Shark; Sea Turtle
33	Animal Neighbors	Rabbit	26 May 1998		1st Place: Peregrine falcon; 2nd Place: Hyrax; 3rd Place: Garibaldi; neighborhood swimming pool
34	Giant Animals	Great Dane	2 June 1998		1st Place: Whale; 2nd Place: Komodo dragon; 3rd Place: Giraffe; Giant Features
35	Creepy Crawly Animals	Grasshopper	9 June 1998		1st Place: Beetle; 2nd Place: Fishing spider; 3rd Place: Springtail; Insects
36	Farm Animals	Cow, Sheep	16 June 1998		1st Place: Cow; 2nd Place: Spectacled bear; 3rd Place: Silkworm; Ostrich
37	Animal Changes	Lion cub, Lioness	23 June 1998		1st Place: Galápagos finch; 2nd Place: Peppered moth; 3rd Place: Ptarmigan; Ant imitate caterpillar into butterfly
38	Extinct Animals	Footprints	30 June 1998		1st Place: Tarpan; 2nd Place: St. Stephens wren; 3rd Place: Tasmanian emu; Pigmy Elephant the rock
39	Animal Eggs	Egg	7 July 1998		1st Place: Crested oropendola; 2nd Place: Crocodile; 3rd Place: Lapwing; Ostrich Egg

=== Season 4 (1999) ===
Episode Number	Title	Title card animal	Date first aired	Plotline	Golden Gecko Award Winners & Henry's Special Report
40	Animals Around the World	Red kangaroo, Monarch butterfly, Chimpanzee, Fish	13 April 1999		Insects: The Party
41	Polar Animals	Siberian Husky	20 April 1999		1st Place: Arctic tern; 2nd Place: Polar bear; 3rd Place: Lemming; The Arctic Icecap
42	Clever Animals	American crow	27 April 1999		1st Place: Raven; 2nd Place: River dolphin; 3rd Place: Chimpanzee; Whale Song
43	Underground Animals	Rabbit	4 May 1999		Note: The only episode to not feature the Golden Gecko Awards: Earthworms.
44	Animal Helpers	Collie	11 May 1999		1st Place: Reindeer; 2nd Place: Golden Retriever; 3rd Place: Ox; Bat Droppings
45	Woodland Animals	Squirrel	18 May 1999		1st Place: Tree squirrel; 2nd Place: Fisher; 3rd Place: Rhyssa wasp; The Sounds of the Forest
46	Mountain Animals	St. Bernard	25 May 1999		1st Place: Mountain gorilla; 2nd Place: Mountain goat; 3rd Place: Andean condor; Yak
47	Backyard Animals	Mockingbird	1 June 1999		1st Place: Pidgeon; 2nd Place: Baboon; 3rd Place: Black kite; The Storks
48	Tiny Animals	Mice	8 June 1999		1st Place: Spider; 2nd Place: Mouse; 3rd Place: Threadsnake; The Food Chain
49	Animal Partners	Mule	15 June 1999		1st Place: Honey badger and Goshawk; 2nd Place: Albatross; 3rd Place: Red kangaroo; Animal Bloodsuckers
50	Scaly Animals	Crocodile, Fish	22 June 1999	Note: The only episode where Henry reads the title and the Narrator does the report.	1st Place: Crocodile; 2nd Place: Chameleon; 3rd Place: Scale-biter cichlid; Lizards
51	River Animals	Beaver, Neon tetra	29 June 1999		1st Place: Giant otter; 2nd Place: Salmon; 3rd Place: Hippopotamus; Mice Fishing
52	Animal Flight	Ladybug	6 July 1999		1st Place: Hummingbird; 2nd Place: Canada goose; 3rd Place: Murre; Flying Mammals

== Merchandise ==
Some merchandise was also released during the activity of the series. An educational computer game was also released with the television show. A board game known as The Really Amazing Animal Game was also sold but was shortly discontinued.
