= Elisabeth Alida Haanen =

Dutch painter

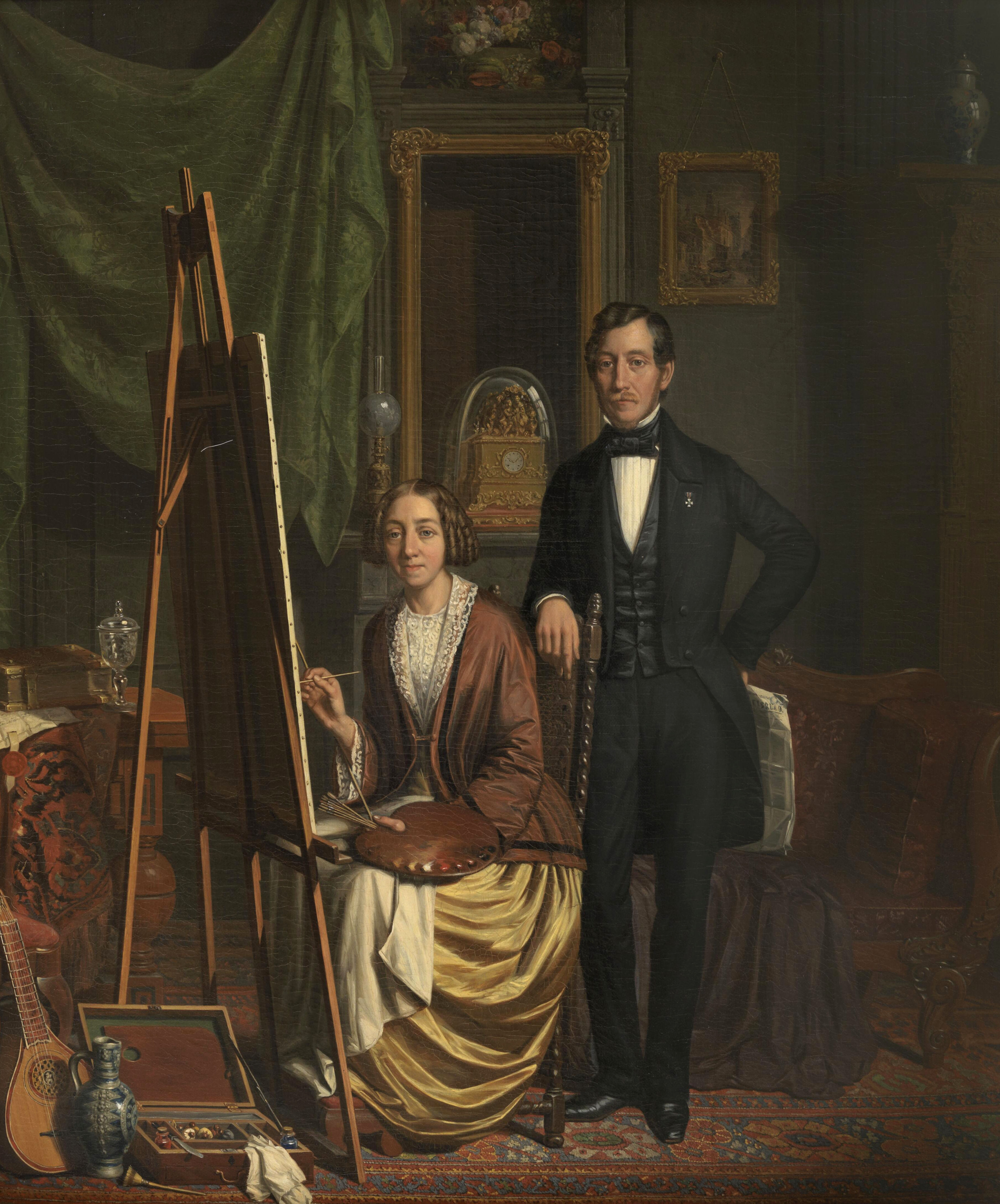
Self-portrait with her husband, Petrus Kiers (1845)

Elisabeth Alida Haanen (1809 in Utrecht – 1845 in Amsterdam), was a 19th-century painter from the Netherlands.

== Biography ==
According to the RKD she was the daughter of Casparis Haanen, and the sister of Adriana Johanna Haanen, George Gilles Haanen and Remigius Adrianus Haanen. She married the artist Petrus Kiers and became the aunt of Cecil van Haanen. She was the mother of George Lourens Kiers and Catharina Isabella Kiers, both of whom also became artists.

From 1838 she was an honorary member of the Royal academy of art in Amsterdam (Koninklijke Academie voor Beeldende Kunsten). She is known for her genre paintings, but was also a papercut artist who cut more than a hundred portraits of artists around 1837.

== Notable works ==
- Pigeons (1841)
