= Pidge =

Pidge may refer to:

== People ==
- Noah Beery Jr. (1913–1994), American actor
- Pidge Browne (1929–1997), American baseball player
- George Browning, an AAU Men's Basketball All-American in the 1921–1922 season

== Other ==
- Pidge Gunderson, a character in Voltron: Legendary Defender, an American animated television series
- Pigeon-hole messagebox or pidge, used for internal mail systems
- Pidge, short for Pigeon, a nickname given to Lady in the 1955 Disney film Lady and the Tramp.
- Pidge, a 1997 children's novel by Ann James

== See also ==
- Pidgey (disambiguation)
- Pigeon (disambiguation)
