= Pigeon Township, Indiana =

Pigeon Township, Indiana may refer to the following places:

- Pigeon Township, Vanderburgh County, Indiana
- Pigeon Township, Warrick County, Indiana

== See also ==
- Pigeon Township (disambiguation)
