= Petrus Kiers =

Dutch painter (1807–1875)

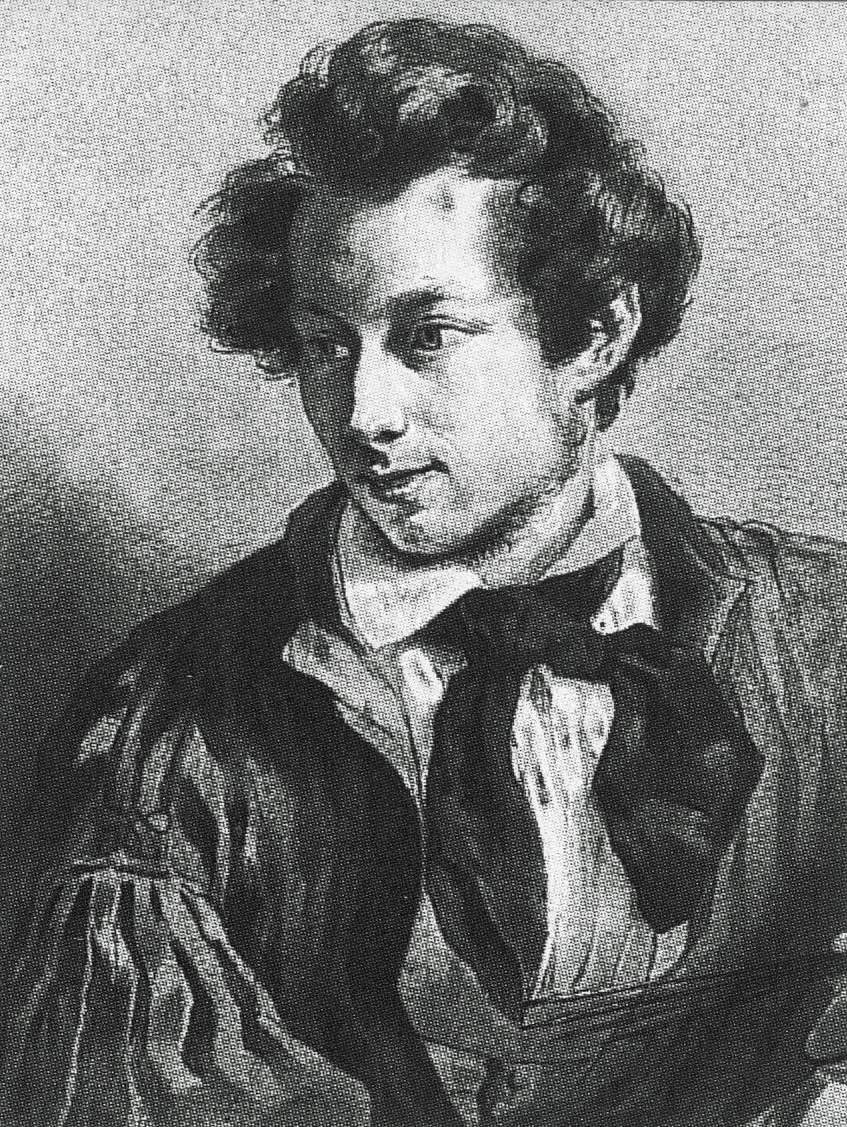
Petrus Kiers, from Schilders van Drenthe (artist not credited)

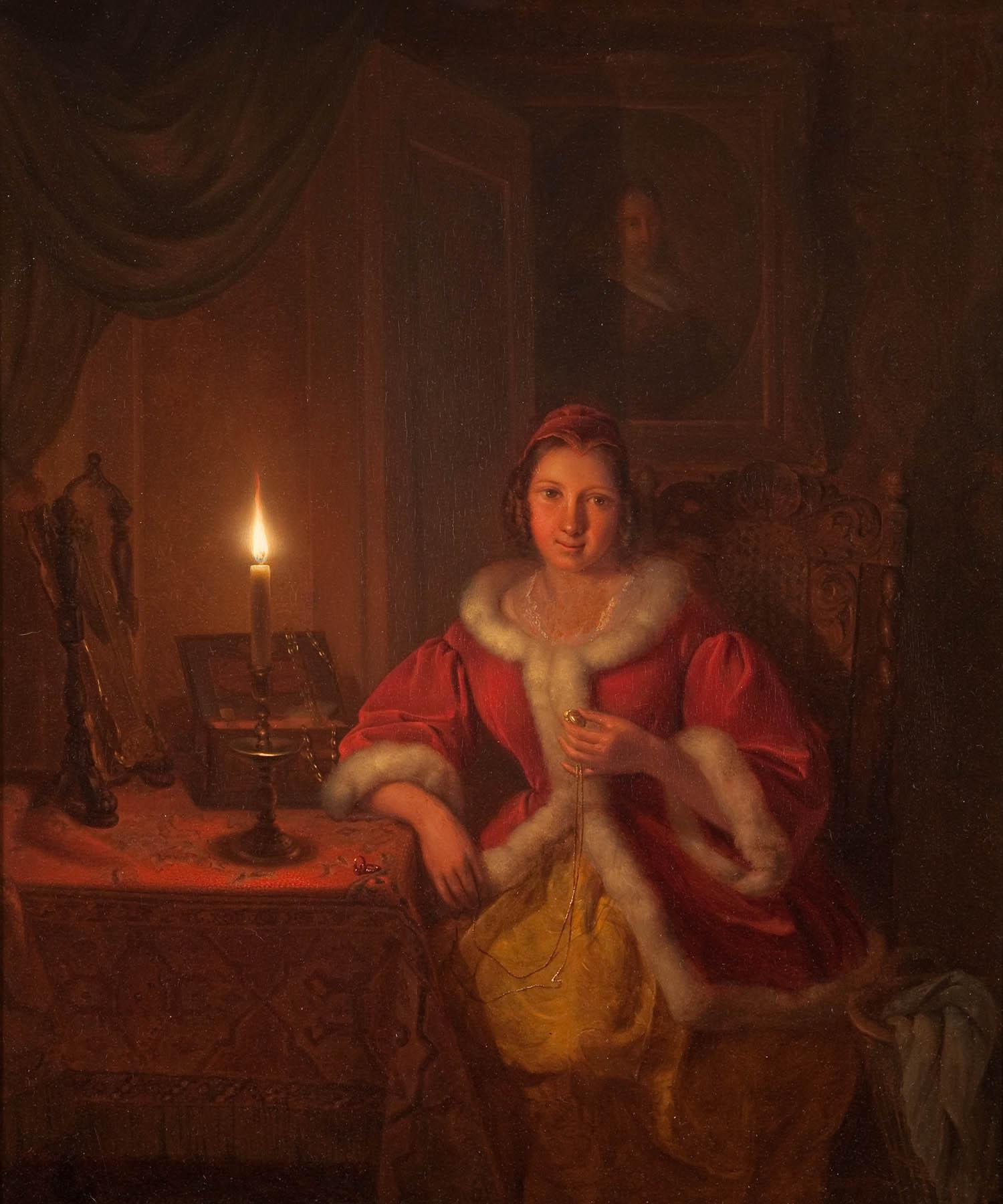
Candlelight Scene in the Boudoir (1841)

Petrus Kiers (5 January 1807, "Het Groeneveld", near Meppel – 17 November 1875, Amsterdam) was a Dutch painter, graphic artist and photographer. He created portraits, still-lifes and cityscapes, but he is best known for his genre scenes, lit by lamps or candles.

== Biography ==
His first lessons were with the portrait and genre painter Douwe de Hoop. From 1825 to 1826, he attended the Rijksakademie. He would continue to work mostly in Amsterdam but, beginning in the 1860s, also worked in Drenthe, especially in Assen.

In 1837, he married the painter Elisabeth Alida Haanen, daughter of the artist Casparis Haanen. Their son, George (1838–1916) became a marine artist and their daughter, Catharina (1839–1930), was a still-life painter. Elisabeth died in 1845 and he remarried in 1850, having two more children.

In 1841, he won a silver medal in a competition held by the Felix Meritis Society. He was a member of Arti et Amicitiae and, in 1856, he was appointed a member of the Rijksakademie. He exhibited widely, including shows in Paris and New York. Maria Vos was among his best-known students.

He also gained a reputation as a pioneering photographer. For several years he was a partner in a photography studio with Johann Benjamin Snoek (1816–1864). Later, he had his own studio in Assen.
