= Louis-Jacques Goussier =

French artist (1722–1799)

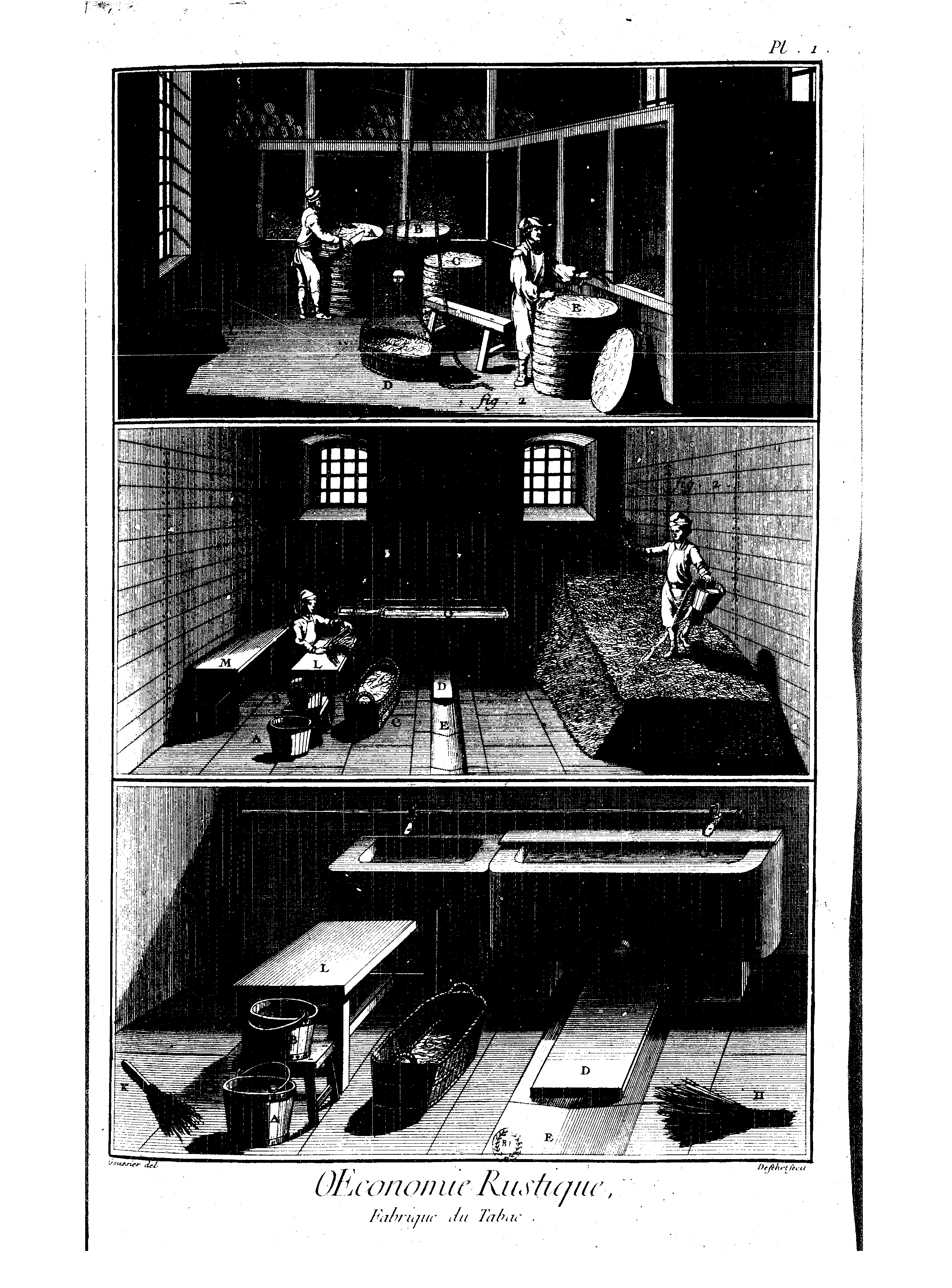
Encyclopedia. tobacco making, vol.1, pl.49

Louis-Jacques Goussier (Paris, 7 March 1722 – Paris, 23 October 1799) was a French illustrator and encyclopedist.

== Career ==
Born poor, he first studied mathematics at Pierre Le Guay de Prémontval's (1716–1764) free school, and then became a teacher himself. The school closed in 1744 and Goussier started an illustrator career. He worked with scientists such as La Condamine, Étienne-Claude de Marivetz and Roland de La Platière. In 1792, he was hired by the Minister of the Interior (arts and craft division) and in 1794 by the Comité de Salut public (weapons division).

== Personal life ==
In 1751, he married Marie-Anne-Françoise Simmonneau. They had two children.
His wife sent him to jail, once, allegating he had no religion and that he didn't have respect for divine and human laws. Ten days later she changed her mind, telling others that he was an honest man with spirit.
As a person, he was a beloved to many, a good husband and a good friend. He liked both pleasure and science.
Denis Diderot made a portrait of Goussier in Jacques le fataliste et son maître, where he stands as La Gousse.

== Diderot's encyclopedia ==
Louis-Jacques Goussier is famous for his work on Diderot's encyclopedia. He was the first drawer to be hired on that project, in 1747 and he did himself more than 900 plates and directed the drawing of the others. Some call Goussier the third encyclopedist, after Diderot and d'Alembert.
Goussier spent ten years visiting people of all arts and techniques (textile, smith, mill, glass, etc.), and twenty-five years drawing. He also wrote sixty-one articles.
