= Lloyd Strickland =

British philosopher and intellectual historian (born 1973)

Lloyd Strickland (Note: Some sources, such as his International Standard Name Identifier (ISNI) and the EThOS catalogue entry for his doctoral thesis, erroneously give his name as "Lloyd H. Strickland". The name with the middle initial is that of an American social psychologist who began publishing before the philosopher was born.)
- Pronunciation: /lɔɪd ˈstrɪklənd/
- Born: 1973 (age 52–53); Malmesbury, England
- Occupation: university lecturer
- Title: Professor of Philosophy and Intellectual History
- Awards: British Academy Mid-Career Fellowship; Gerda-Henkel-Stiftung Forschungsstipendium

Education
- Education: B.A. (Hons) Lanc.; M.A. Sheff.; Ph.D. Lanc.
- Alma mater: University of Lancaster
- Thesis: The best of all possible worlds: An exposition and critical examination of Leibnizian optimism (2005)

Philosophical work
- Era: Contemporary philosophy
- Region: Western philosophy
- School: Analytic philosophy
- Institutions: MMU; UWTSD; UWL; UCLan; LU
- Main interests: early modern philosophy; Gottfried Wilhelm Leibniz, his influences, and his correspondents; philosophy of religion; André-Pierre Le Guay de Prémontval; numeral systems in the history of mathematics; philosophy from Africa and from other non-Western sources
- Notable works: Books published: Leibniz Reinterpreted (2006); The Shorter Leibniz Texts (2006); Leibniz and the Two Sophies (2011); Leibniz’s Monadology (2014); Leibniz on God and Religion (2016); Tercentenary Essays on the Philosophy and Science of Leibniz (2017); The Philosophical Writings of Prémontval (2018); Proofs of God in Early Modern Europe (2018); Leibniz’s Legacy and Impact (2019); Leibniz’s Key Philosophical Writings (2020); 100 Awesome Lateral Thinking Puzzles (2022); Leibniz on Binary (2022)
- Website: Leibniz-translations.com; Academia.edu @StricklandLloyd; ResearchGate @Lloyd-Strickland; 𝕏 (Twitter) @Dr_L_Strickland; YouTube @prof.lloydstrickland7332

Lloyd Strickland (born 1973) is a British philosopher, intellectual historian, Leibniz scholar, and translator of early modern philosophical texts. He is Professor of Philosophy and Intellectual History at Manchester Metropolitan University.

== Recent work ==
Strickland was awarded a Mid-Career Fellowship in 2017 from The British Academy for work on the original manuscript of Gottfried Wilhelm Leibniz’s 1686 Examen religionis Christianae (Examination of the Christian Religion). Later, the Gerda Henkel Foundation awarded him a Forschungsstipendium (research scholarship); this was to support Strickland’s work with American computer scientist Harry Lewis in writing Leibniz on Binary: The Invention of Computer Arithmetic, which was published in November 2022.

Strickland is known for his work on Leibniz, including several volumes of English translations, of which Leibniz on Binary is the latest. It is one of his important contributions to the history of binary and other non-decimal number systems, which include identifying what led Thomas Harriot and Gottfried Wilhelm Leibniz each to his own independent invention of binary numeration, the role of Leibniz’s invention in the birth of modern computing, and elements in the history of base-16 numeration.

Strickland has also become known for his work identifying racially-motivated negationism in the formation of the Western philosophical canon and has called for the recuperative broadening of the Western philosophical curriculum. He has also specifically advocated the teaching of African traditional philosophies.

== Sample publications ==
=== Books ===
- Strickland, Lloyd (2011), Leibniz and the Two Sophies: The Philosophical Correspondence, The Other Voice in Early Modern Europe: The Toronto Series, vol. 10, Toronto: Iter Press, ISBN 978-0-7727-2084-9
- Strickland, Lloyd (2014), Leibniz's Monadology: A New Translation and Guide, Edinburgh: Edinburgh University Press, ISBN 978-0-7486-9321-4
- Strickland, Lloyd, ed. (2016), Leibniz on God and Religion: A Reader, London: Bloomsbury Academic, ISBN 978-1-4725-8061-0
- Strickland, Lloyd (2018), The Philosophical Writings of Prémontval, Lanham, Maryland: Lexington Books, ISBN 978-1-4985-6356-7
- Strickland, Lloyd (2018), Proofs of God in Early Modern Europe: An Anthology, Waco, Texas: Baylor University Press, ISBN 978-1-4813-0931-8
- Lodge, Paul & Strickland, Lloyd, eds. (2020), Leibniz's Key Philosophical Writings: A Guide, Oxford/New York: Oxford University Press, doi:10.1093/oso/9780198844983.001.0001, ISBN 978-0-19-884498-3, LCCN 2020945342
- Strickland, Lloyd (2022), 100 Awesome Lateral Thinking Puzzles, Olympia Publishers, ISBN 978-1-80074-723-4
- Strickland, Lloyd & Lewis, Harry Roy (2022), Leibniz on Binary: The Invention of Computer Arithmetic, The MIT Press, doi:10.7551/mitpress/14123.001.0001, ISBN 978-0-262-54434-4

=== Journal articles ===
- Strickland, Lloyd (June 2006) [7 April 2006], "God's problem of multiple choice" (PDF), Religious Studies, 42 (2), Cambridge University Press: 141–157, doi:10.1017/S0034412506008249, eISSN 1469-901X, ISSN 0034-4125, JSTOR 20008641, OCLC 1763674
- Strickland, Lloyd (Spring 2009) [16 April 2009], "The Philosophy of Sophie, Electress of Hanover" (PDF), Hypatia, 24 (2), Wiley: 186–204, doi:10.1111/j.1527-2001.2009.01038.x, eISSN 1527-2001, ISSN 0887-5367, JSTOR 20618153, LCCN 87655721, OCLC 243426299
- Strickland, Lloyd (December 2013) [7 April 2013], "Philosophy and the Search for Truth", Philosophia, 41 (4), Springer: 1079–1094, doi:10.1007/s11406-013-9426-5, eISSN 1574-9274, ISSN 0048-3893, LCCN 70955463, OCLC 610312518
- Strickland, Lloyd (April 2014) [23 August 2013], "The 'who designed the designer?' objection to design arguments", International Journal for Philosophy of Religion, 75 (2), Springer: 87–100, doi:10.1007/s11153-013-9422-5, eISSN 1572-8684, ISSN 0020-7047, JSTOR 24709265
- Strickland, Lloyd & Church, Michael (3 February 2015), "Leibniz's Observations on Hydrology: An Unpublished Letter on the Great Lombardy Flood of 1705", Annals of Science, 72 (4), Taylor & Francis: 517–532, doi:10.1080/00033790.2014.989542, eISSN 1464-505X, ISSN 0003-3790, LCCN 37037975, OCLC 01481407, PMID 26221837
- Strickland, Lloyd (27 September 2016), "Leibniz's Harmony between the Kingdoms of Nature and Grace" (PDF), Archiv für Geschichte der Philosophie, 98 (3), Berlin/Boston: Walter de Gruyter GmbH: 302–329, doi:10.1515/agph-2016-0014, eISSN 1613-0650, ISSN 0003-9101
- Strickland, Lloyd (October 2018) [17 April 2018], "The problem of religious evil: Does belief in god cause evil?" (PDF), International Journal for Philosophy of Religion, 84 (2), Springer: 237–250, doi:10.1007/s11153-018-9665-2, eISSN 1572-8684, ISSN 0020-7047, JSTOR 48700469
- Strickland, Lloyd (2018), "The 'Fourth Hypothesis' on the Early Modern Mind-Body Problem" (PDF), Ergo, 5 № 25, Michigan Publishing: 665–685, doi:10.3998/ergo.12405314.0005.025, eISSN 2330-4014, LCCN 2013203140
- Strickland, Lloyd (28 January 2019), "Staying Optimistic: The Trials and Tribulations of Leibnizian Optimism" (PDF), Journal of Modern Philosophy, 1 № 3, Aperio: 1–21, doi:10.32881/jomp.3, eISSN 2644-0652
- Strickland, Lloyd (29 August 2021), "Do we Need a Plant Theodicy?" (PDF), Scientia et Fides, 9 (2, Experimental Psychology and the Notion of Personhood, "The Nature and Limits of Theodicy"), Toruń: Faculty of Theology of Nicolaus Copernicus University in Toruń: 221–246, doi:10.12775/SetF.2021.026, eISSN 2353-5636, ISSN 2300-7648
- Strickland, Lloyd & Jones, Owain Daniel (June 2023) [18 August 2022], "F Things You (Probably) Didn't Know About Hexadecimal" (PDF), The Mathematical Intelligencer, 45 (2), Springer Nature: 126–130, doi:10.1007/s00283-022-10206-w, eISSN 1866-7414, ISSN 0343-6993
- Strickland, Lloyd (17 April 2023), "Why Did Thomas Harriot Invent Binary?" (PDF), The Mathematical Intelligencer, 46, Springer Nature: 57–62, doi:10.1007/s00283-023-10271-9, eISSN 1866-7414, ISSN 0343-6993
