= Pijon =

Pijon may refer to:

- Pijon (Pokémon), the original Japanese name for Pidgeotto, a fictional species of Pokémon
- Jean Joseph Magdeleine Pijon (1758–1799), French general in the French Revolutionary Wars

== See also ==
- Pigeon (disambiguation)
- Pidgin (disambiguation)
