= Pidgin (disambiguation) =

Pidgin is a simplified language that develops between two or more groups who do not share a common language, as contrasted to a Creole language, a full language with native speakers, often originating from a Pidgin language.

Pidgin may also refer to:

- One of several particular languages commonly called "Pidgin":
  - Betawi language, an Austronesian language native to Jakarta, Indonesia
  - Cameroonian Pidgin English or Kamtok, spoken in the North West and South West of Cameroon
  - Chinook Jargon, a pidgin trade language originating from the Pacific Northwest of North America
  - Liberian English, the Liberian descendant of West African Pidgin English
  - Nigerian Pidgin, a creole language spoken as a lingua franca across Nigeria
  - ...or any of a large number of additional languages, see Pidgin § List of notable pidgins
- Pidgin (software), an instant messaging client formerly known as Gaim
- Pidgin code, a mixture of several programming languages in the same program

== See also ==
- Melanesian Pidgin (disambiguation)
- Broken English (disambiguation)
- Creole (disambiguation)
- Pidgeon (disambiguation)
- Pigeon (disambiguation)
- Pijon (disambiguation)
