= Douwe de Hoop =

Dutch painter and draftsman (1800–1830)

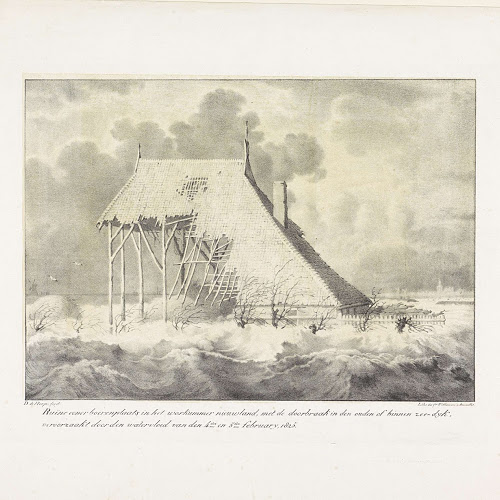
A Farm, washed away by the flood of 1825, in Friesland

Douwe de Hoop (24 March 1800, Workum – 27 October 1830, Amsterdam) was a Dutch painter and draftsman.

== Life and work ==
His father, Jan de Hoop, was a wood miller. His family wanted him to pursue a career in commerce, but he chose to go against their wishes and become an artist.

His initial lessons came from Joost Zeeman (1776-1845), a local painter who specialized in still-lifes. He then became apprenticed to Cornelis Kruseman in Amsterdam. This was followed by advanced instruction at the Rijksakademie van beeldende kunsten. During his stay there, he won several awards. At first, he focused on still-lifes, but expanded into portraits and genre scenes, generally lit by candles or lamps; a style that was very popular for a time. Later, he taught Petrus Kiers, who would be considered the master of candlelight painting. He also made sketches of the February flood of 1825, many of which were made into prints.

His oeuvre is relatively small, due to his early death at the age of thirty. His work may be seen at the Rijksmuseum, the Fries Museum and the Fries Scheepvaart Museum.
