= Remigius Adrianus Haanen =

Dutch painter

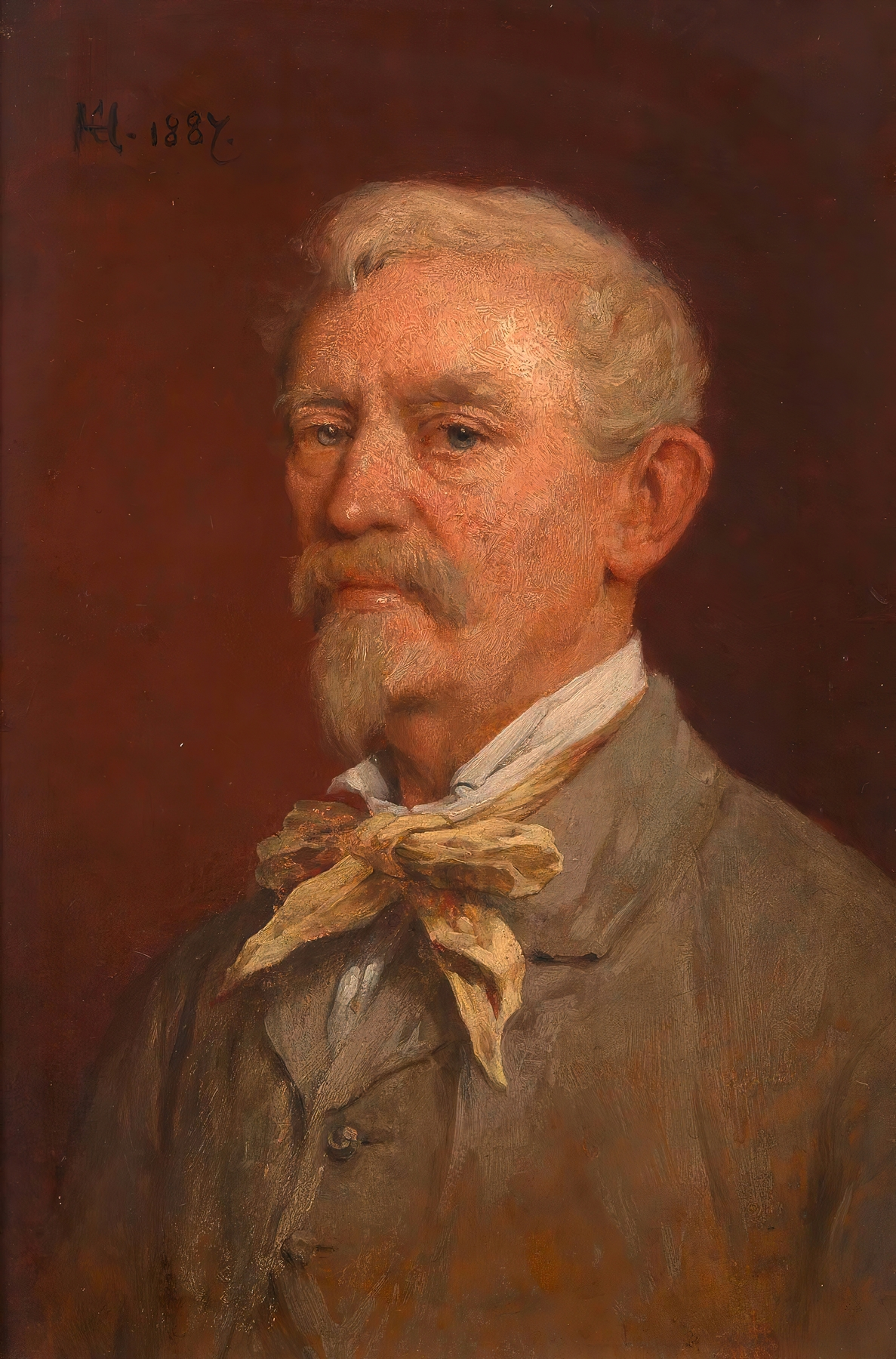
Portrait of Haanen by Cecil van Haanen, 1887

Remigius Adrianus Haanen or Remigius (Remy) van Haanen, (January 5, 1812, Oosterhout - August 13, 1894, Bad Aussee) was a 19th-century painter from the Northern Netherlands. He was the son of the papercutter Casparis Haanen and was the brother of the painters George Gillis Haanen, Elisabeth Alida Haanen and Adriana Johanna Haanen. After learning his trade from his father and at the Academy of Utrecht, he moved in 1837 from the Netherlands to Austria, where he was active in Vienna.

== Public Collections ==
- Museum of Foreign Art, Riga
- Rijksmuseum Amsterdam

== Gallery ==
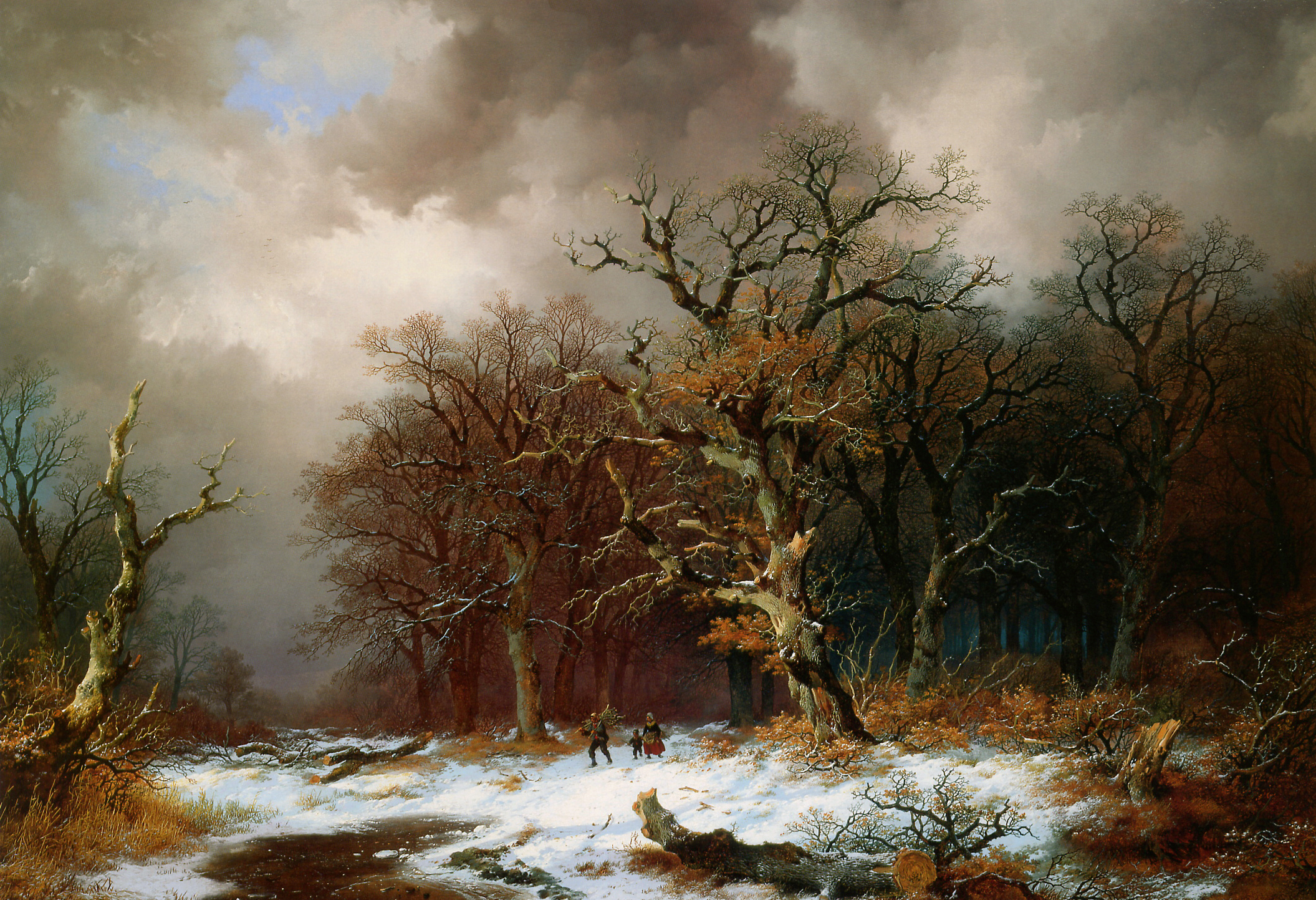
Faggot Gatherers in Winter Landscape (Unknown)

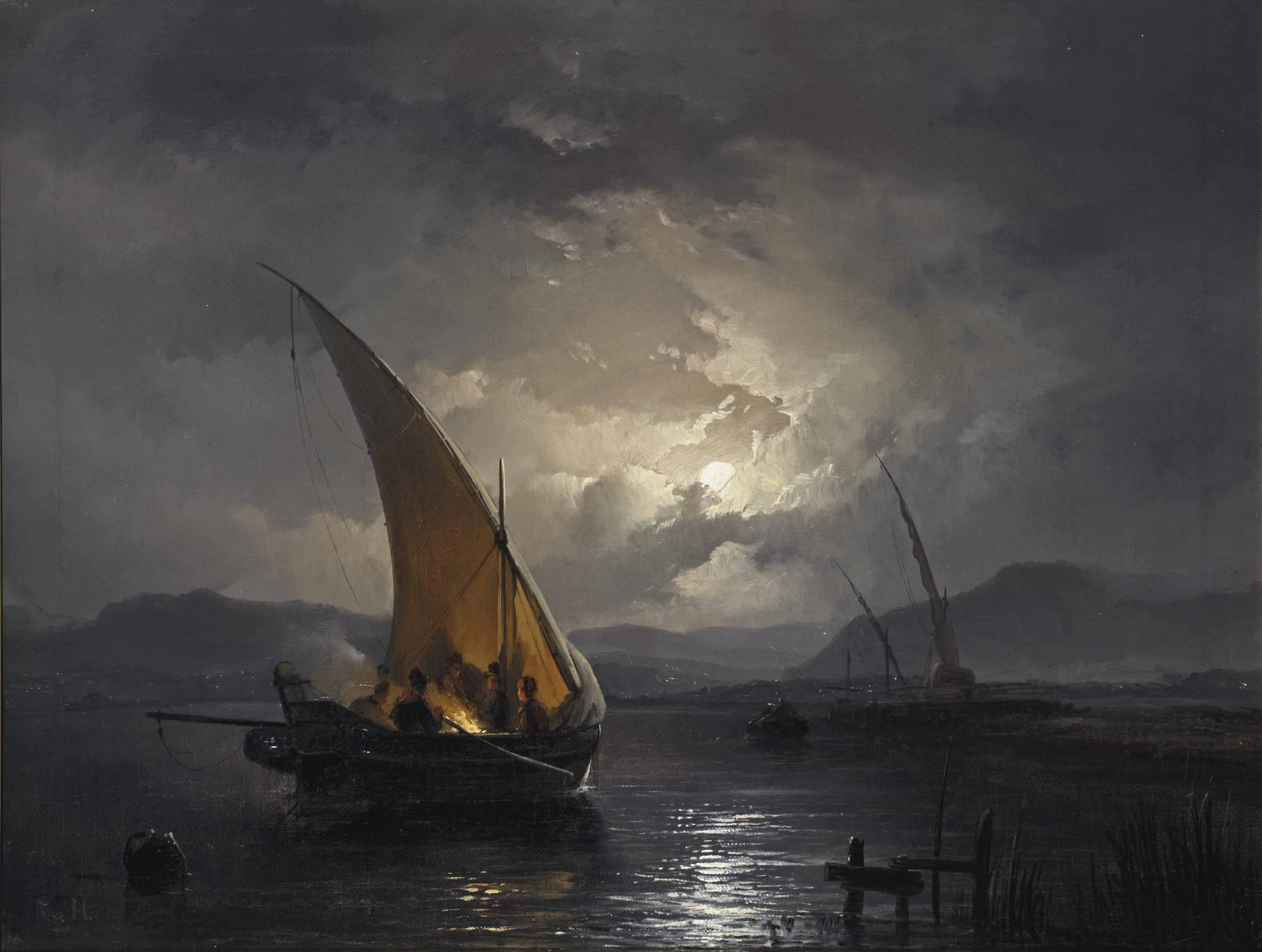
A night landscape with a sailboat where a fire is being lit

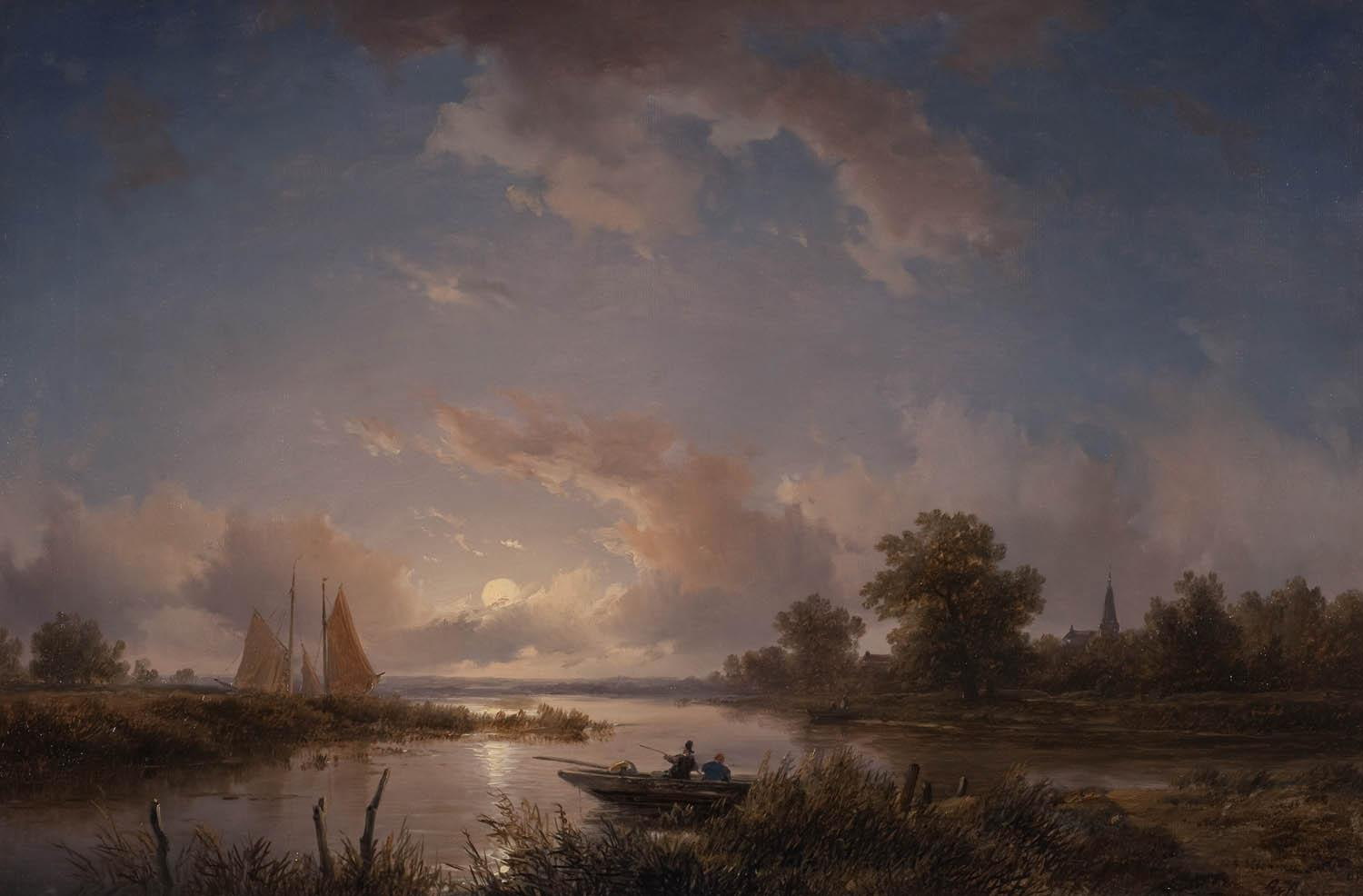
Anglers in a Rowing Boat at Twilight

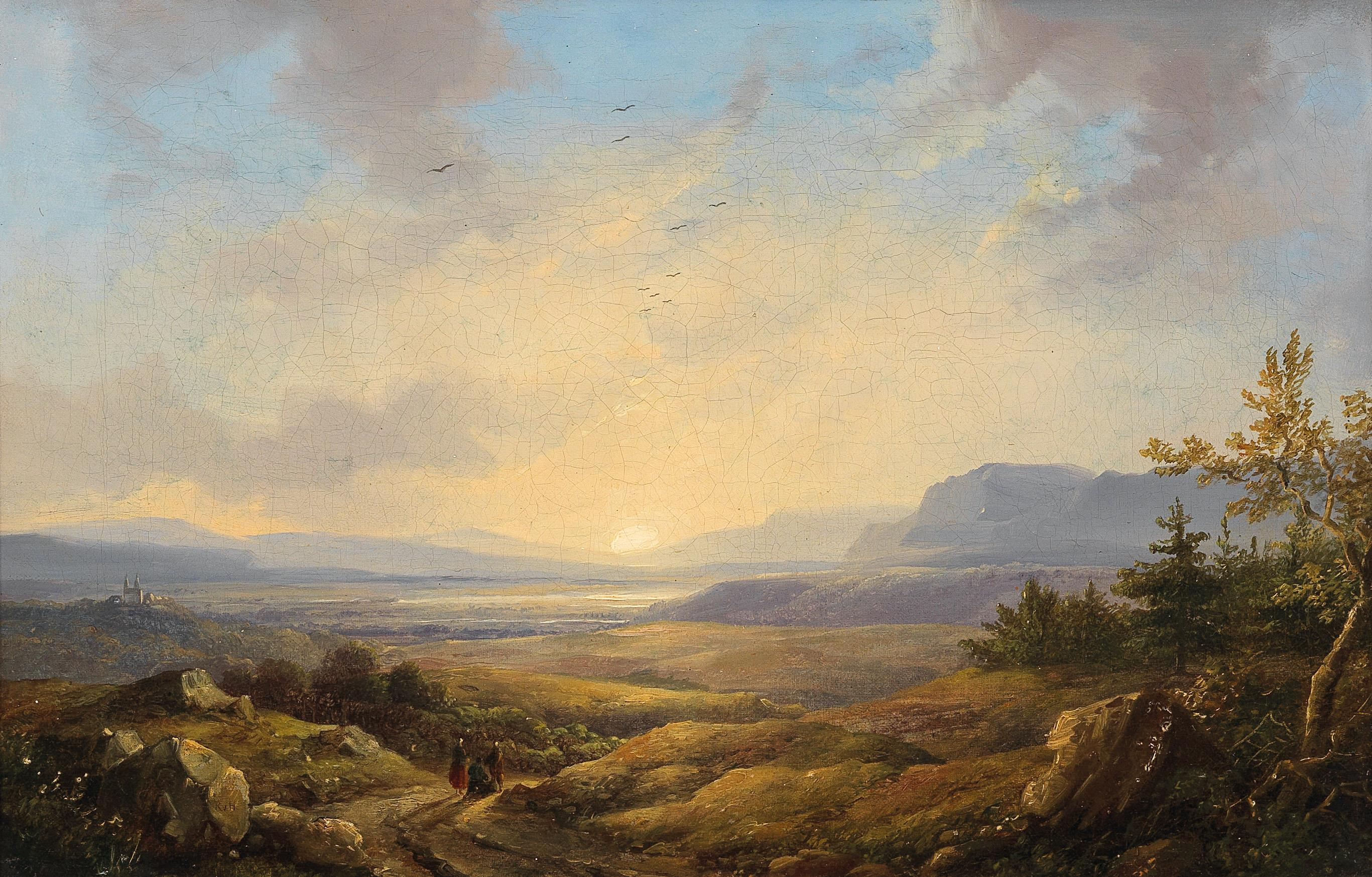
Open Landscape at Sunset

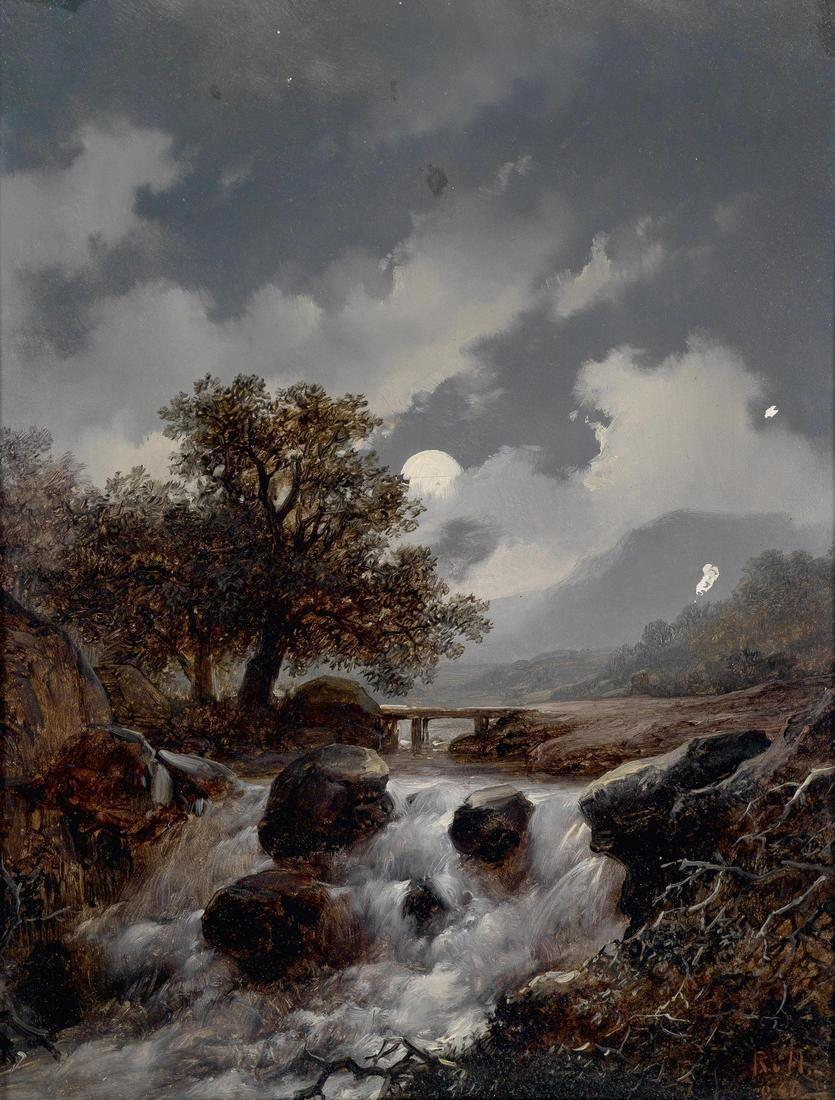
Stream in the Moonlight

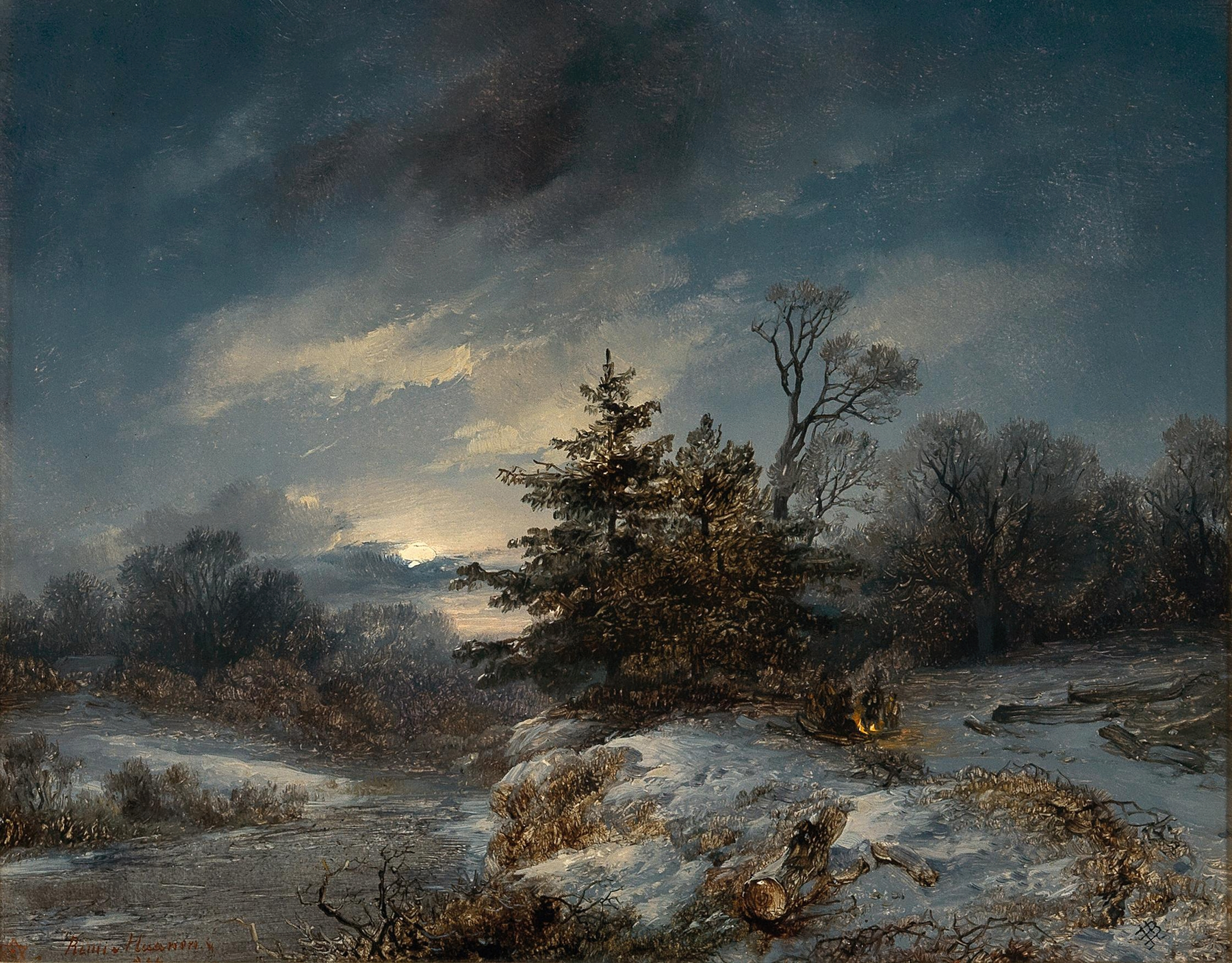
A Winter Evening
