= Marie Anne Victoire Pigeon =

French mathematician

Marie-Anne-Victoire de Prémontval, née Pigeon d'Osangis (born 1724, Paris; died 1767, Berlin) was a French mathematician and writer.

She was the daughter of the scientist Jean Pigeon. In 1744, she eloped with her teacher, mathematician Pierre Le Guay de Prémontval, to Switzerland, where they married, and then to Berlin. In 1752, she was a teacher of princess Wilhelmina of Hesse-Kassel.

== Works ==
- Pigeon, Marie-Anne-Victoire (1750). Le Mécaniste philosophe, ou Mémoires concernant plusieurs particularités de la vie et des ouvrages de Jean Pigeon. The Hague.
