= Pidgey =

Pidgey may refer to:

- Pidgey Morgan (1853–1910), American professional baseball player
- Pidgey (Pokémon), a species in the Pokémon franchise

== See also ==
- Pidge (disambiguation)
