= George Gillis Haanen =

Dutch painter

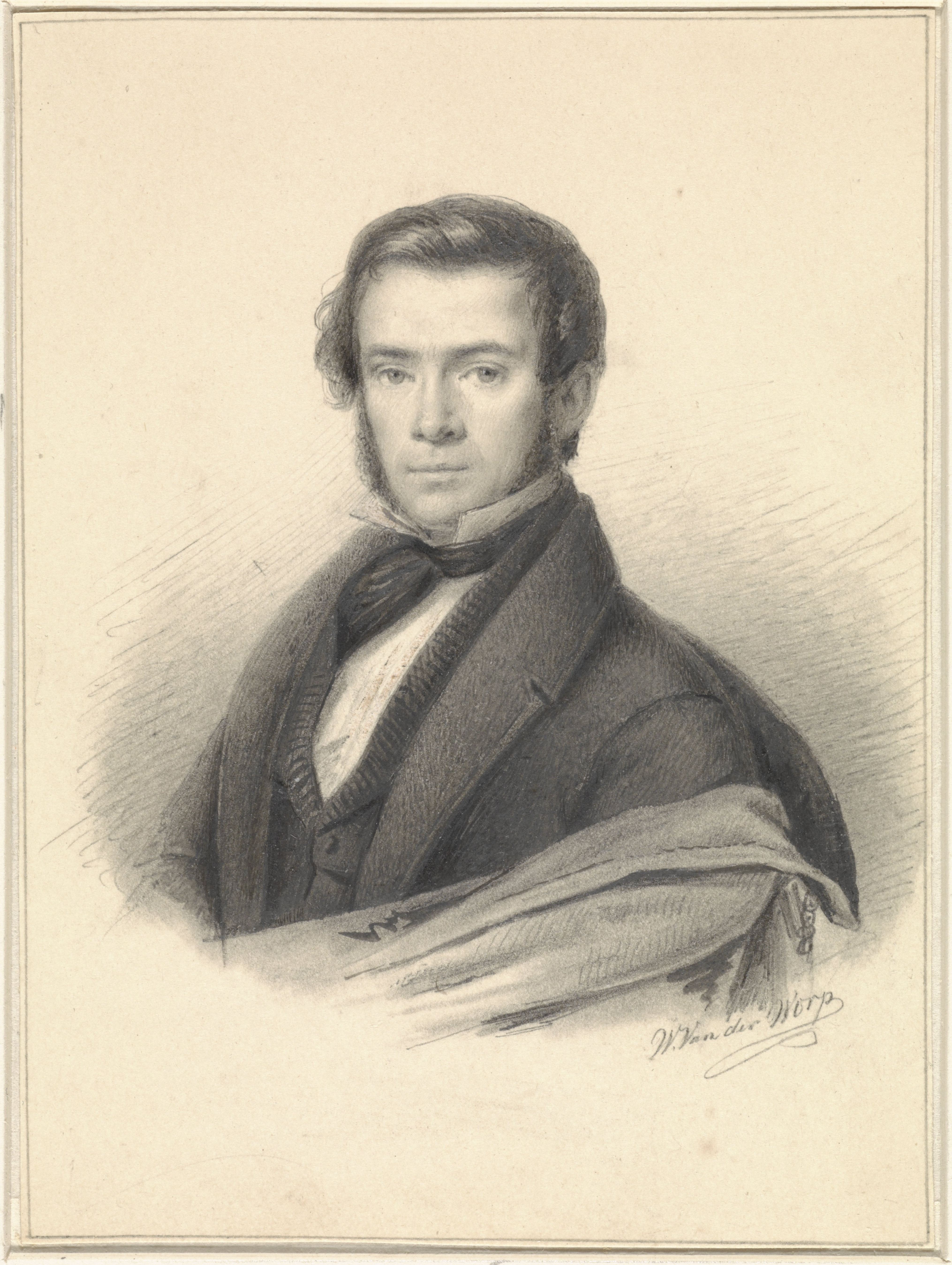
- George Gillis Haanen by Willem van der Worp
- Born: 23 August 1807
- Died: 17 July 1879 (aged 71); Bilsen
- Occupation: Landscape Painter

George Gillis Haanen (23 August 1807 - 17 July 1879) was a 19th-century landscape painter from Netherlands.

== Biography ==
He was born in Utrecht, the son of painter and paper silhouette cutter Casparis Haanen, and was brother to the painters Adriana Johanna Haanen, Elisabeth Alida Haanen and Remigius Adrianus Haanen. He became a member of "Arti Sacrum" in 1831 in Rotterdam, and became a member of the Royal Academy of Amsterdam in 1835. He travelled and worked along the Rhine and Austria, and is known for landscapes. He died in Bilsen.

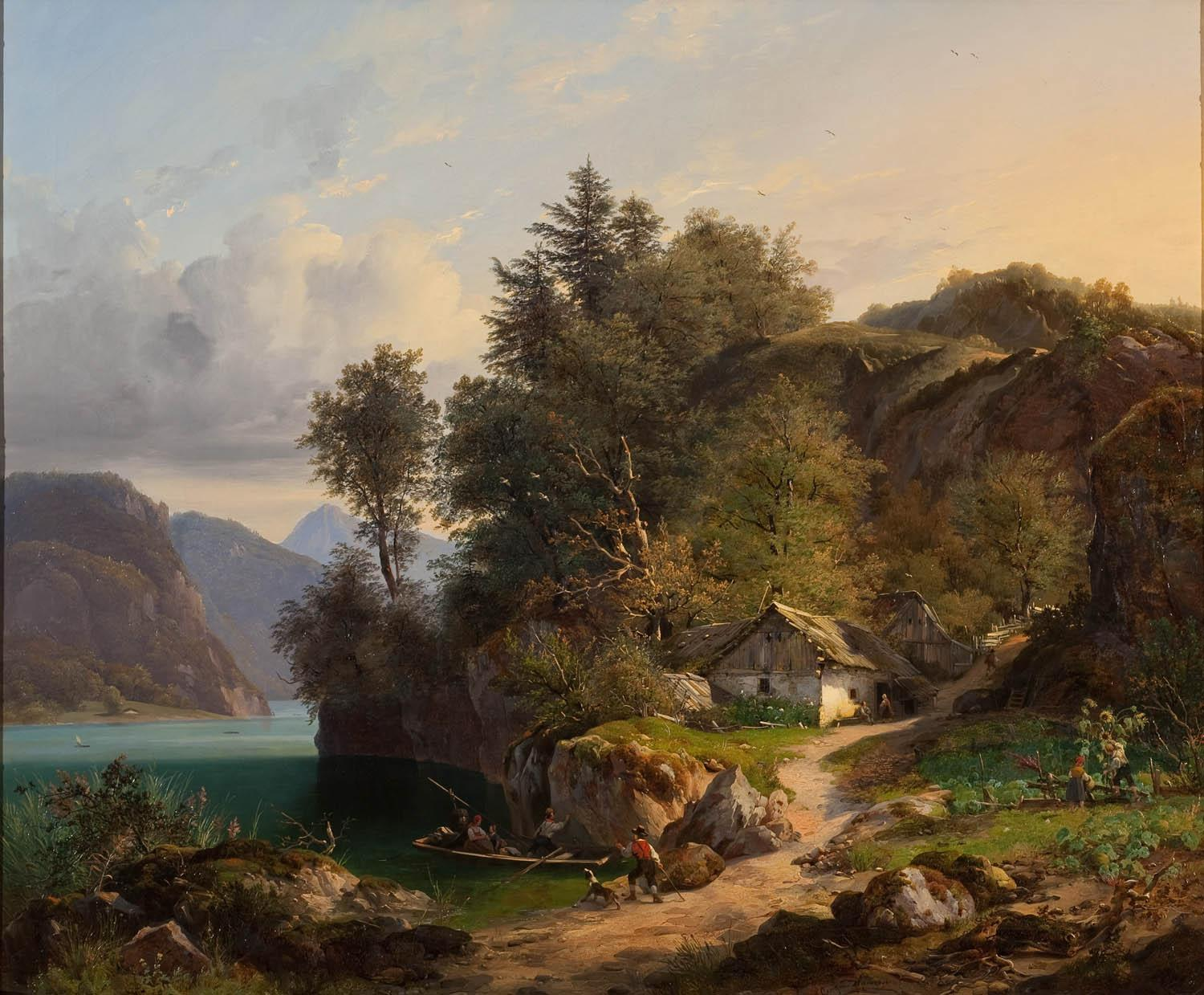
Austrian landscape
