= Adriana Johanna Haanen =

Dutch painter

- Haanen c. 1890
- Born: 14 June 1814; Oosterhout, Netherlands
- Died: 8 October 1895 (aged 81); Oosterhout, Netherlands
- Known for: Still life painting
- Partner: Maria Vos

Adriana Johanna Haanen (Dutch pronunciation: [aːdriˈjaːnaː joːˈɦɑnaː ˈɦaːnə(n)]; 14 June 1814 – 8 October 1895) was a Dutch painter.

== Biography ==
Adriana Johanna Haanen was born in Oosterhout in 1814. She was the youngest child of the papercutter Casparis Haanen and the sister of the painters George Gillis Haanen, Elisabeth Alida Haanen, and Remigius Adrianus Haanen. Haanen and all of her siblings were educated in art by their father, but Adriana was the only one to achieve success in Holland. She is the aunt of the painter Cecil van Haanen, and taught painters Anna Abrahams and Christina Alida Blijdenstein.

Haanen is known for her paintings of fruit and flowers, but she also has rare paintings of live and deceased subjects. In 1845, she became an honorary member of the Royal Academy in Amsterdam. In 1862, she was awarded a gold medal by the city of Amsterdam for a painting she had submitted to the annual Levende Meesters exhibition. Haanen regularly submitted her works to the Levende Meesters exhibition and others in Amsterdam, Antwerp, Brussels, Bremen and Paris.

Haanen had a very close friendship with fellow artist Maria Vos. Haanen moved from Amsterdam to Oosterbeek in 1853, where she shared a house with Vos in an artists' colony. Haanen put high price tag on her works, and the sale of her works became very lucrative. In 1870, Haanen and Vos built a large house together in Oosterbeek (called "Villa Grada"), where they continued to live together.

Haanen died in Oosterbeek in 1895.

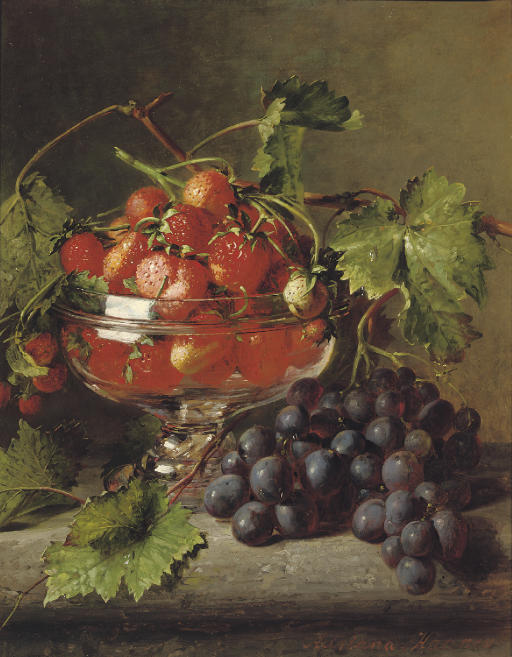
Strawberries in a bowl with a bunch of grapes
