= Pidgeon =

Pidgeon is a surname from an archaic spelling of pigeon. Notable people with the surname include:

- Caroline Pidgeon, Baroness Pidgeon (born 1972), British politician
- Elsie Pidgeon (1879–1956), Australian army nurse and hospital matron
- Emily Pidgeon (born 1989), English athlete
- Frank Pidgeon (1825–1884), American baseball player
- George C. Pidgeon (1872–1971), Canadian religious minister
- Harry Pidgeon (1869–1954), American sailor, circumnavigator
- Jeff Pidgeon, American writer and actor
- John Pidgeon (1926–2016), Australian contractor and property developer
- Lloyd Montgomery Pidgeon (1903–1999), Canadian chemist and metallurgist
- Monica Pidgeon (1913–2009), British interior designer and architectural writer
- Rebecca Pidgeon (born 1965), American actor and songwriter
- Sarah Pidgeon (born 1996), American actor
- Valmai Pidgeon, Australian philanthropist and construction contractor
- W. R. Pidgeon, English inventor of an electrostatic machine
- Walter Pidgeon (1897–1984), Canadian-American actor
- William Pidgeon (1909–1981), Australian painter
- William Pidgeon (archaeologist) (c. 1800 – c. 1880), American antiquarian and archaeologist

== See also ==
- Pidgin (disambiguation)
- Pigeon (disambiguation)
