= Pigeon, West Virginia =

- Unincorporated community
- Location within West Virginia Location within the United States
- Coordinates: 38°32′12″N 81°12′30″W
- Country: United States
- State: West Virginia
- County: Roane
- Elevation: 873 ft (266 m)
- Time zone: UTC-5 (Eastern (EST))
  - Summer (DST): UTC-4 (EDT)
- ZIP codes: 25155
- Area codes: 304 & 681
- GNIS feature ID: 1555345

Pigeon is an unincorporated community in Roane County, West Virginia, United States. Pigeon is 8 miles (13 km) northeast of Clendenin.

The community was named after nearby Pigeon Run.
