= Pigeon (company) =

Korean household product manufacturer

Pigeon Corporation
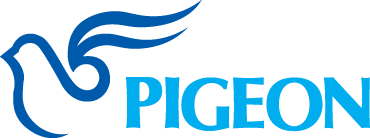
- Company type: Public
- Industry: Consumer goods (Comprehensive household products)
- Founded: 1978
- Headquarters: 628-13, Yeoksam-dong, Gangnam-gu, Seoul, South Korea
- Key people: Lee Youn-Gae (CEO); Lee Ju-Yeon (Vice President)
- Subsidiaries: Pigeon Motors; Sunil Logistics
- Website: www.pigeon.co.kr

Pigeon Corporation, established in 1978, is a manufacturer of household products. In August 1978, the company created "Pigeon", the first fabric softener made in Korea. From 1978 to 2009, the company held a dominant market share, exceeding 50%, of the fabric softener market in South Korea. However, starting in 2011, its market share began to decline, and by 2022, it had reduced to approximately 20%.

== History ==
- 1978. 01. Pigeon Corporation founded
- 1978. 07. Fabric Softener, "Pigeon", is released
- 1980. 12. Pigeon products exported to the Middle East
- 1981. 03. Dishwashing liquid, "New Clean", is released
- 1981. 04. The First manufacturing facility is completed (Bupyeong)
- 1981. 06. "Pigeon Rox" is released
- 1982. 04. Technical Tie with Alberto Culver Co., of the U.S.
- 1985. 01. Completed the computerization of business
- 1987. 10. Dish-washing product, "Sora", is released
- 1988. 05. The Central Research Institute is established
- 1988. 07. Drainpipe Cleaner, "Power Drill Pung", is released
- 1988. 10. Started to produce laundry detergent, "New Sora"
- 1989. 05. The second manufacturing facility is completed (Jincheon)
- 1989. 07. Refrigerator Deodorizer, "Bamboo Pansil", is released
- 1990. 02. Hair Care Product, "Duena", is released
- 1990. 04. Body Cleanser, "Maplus" is released
- 1991. 05. Apartment Complex for Company employees is completed
- 1992. 04. Installed Processing Equipment for the Production of Make-up products in the second manufacturing facility
- 1992. 07. Signed an exclusive contract with Sunstar of Japan to sell oral care products. Started to import and sell "Do Toothbrush and Toothpaste"
- 1992. 07. Established an On-Location Company, "Pigeon China daily Use Chem. Co", in Tianjin, China
- 1994. 01. The third manufacturing facility in Ulsan is completed
- 1994. 05 Signed an exclusive sales contract with L&F Inc of the US
- 1994. 05 Selling of the Anti-Bacterial Spray, "Lysol", started
- 1996. 06 Oxygen Bleach, "Paracle" is released
- 1996. 07 Selected as a Company with Excellence in Labor-Management Relationships
- 1996. 12 The Number of Pigeon products sold reaches 2 billion units
- 1997. 07 Technical Tie with Hakugen Corp. of Japan
- 1997. 07 Insect Repellent "Mrs. Lloyd" is released
- 1998. 08 Baby care product, "Beau Jules" is released
- 1999. 09 Business tie with Pigeon Japan
- 2000. 03 The third generation antibacterial cleaner, "Bisol" is released
- 2002. 02 Toothpaste, "Denticoen Q10", is released
- 2005. 01 Auto Fan Air Freshener, "Aroma Wind", is released
- 2005. 01 "Pigeon Charcoal Insect Repellent Dehumidifier" is released
- 2005. 05 Stain remover "Magic 02 Spray" is released
- 2005. 06 Liquid Laundry Detergent, "Act’z, Act’z Drum", is released
- 2005. 10 Baby care product "Beau Jules ATO-free" is released
- 2006. 11 Fabric Softener, ‘Pigeon’ renewal is released
- 2006. 11 Dish Wash Detergent Pure ‘Baking Soda’ is released
- 2007. 03 Charcoal Dehumidifier ‘Slim Type’ is released
- 2007. 05 ‘Aroma Plus’ is released
- 2007. 10 ‘Single Life Set’ Top & Front loading type are released
- 2007. 11 ‘Leisure Set" is released
- 2008. 04 ‘Transparent Pigeon’ is released
- 2008. 04 ‘Act’z Deo Fresh’ is released
- 2008. 04 ‘Pigeon Deo Fresh’ is released
- 2008. 06 ‘Antibacterial Bisol Spray & Tissue’ are released
- 2008. 07 Hand Wash " MUMU’ is released
- 2008. 07 Multi-purpose Cleaner ‘Bisol PowerX3’ is released
- 2009. 04 ‘Totalcare, Pigeon’ is released
- 2009. 05 ‘SprayPigeon CoolDeo’ is released
- 2010. 04 ‘Highly Concentrated Pigeon’ is released
- 2010. 07 Launched children's brand ‘Beau Jules’
- 2012. 06 Launched ‘Ultra Pigeon’
- 2013. 04 Launched ‘Pigeon Fresh (Purple Lavender, Yellow Bouquet)’
- 2013. 11 Launched ‘Pigeon Premium’
- 2014. 04 Launched ‘Antiseptic Dirt-Free Premium’
- 2014. 05 Launched ‘Actz Premium’
- 2017. 07 Launched ‘Highly Concentrated Pigeon Rich Perfume Signature’
- 2018. 02 Launched ‘Pigeon for Dryers’
- 2018. 05 Launched ‘Rich Perfume Spray’
- 2019. 02 Launched ‘Highly Concentrated Pigeon Rich Perfume’1L
- 2019. 04 Launched ‘Pigeon Air Sheet’for clothes cleaners
- 2019. 07 Launched premium type 1 kitchen detergent‘Pure Apple Balm/Virgin Mojito’

== Main products lines ==
=== Fabric softener ===
- Transparent Pigeon
- Pigeon
- Spray Pigeon
- Drum Pigeon
- Aroma Plus

=== Laundry detergent ===
- Act'z
- Act'z Drum
- Wool touch

=== Disinfectant detergent ===
- Bisol
- Bisol PowerX3

=== Personal Care ===
- Maplus(Body Wash)
- MUMU(Hand Wash)

=== Oxygen Bleach ===
- Paracle
- Paracle Liguid
- Magic O2

=== Dish-washing Liguid ===
- Pure
- New Clean

=== Rox ===
- Pigeon RoxPigeon Fragrant Rox
- Pigeon Fragrant Rox, Pigeon Rox detergent
- Power Drill Pung

=== Dehumidifier ===
- Charcoal Dehumidifier

=== Deodorizer ===
- Fine

=== Toothpaste ===
- Denticoen Q10

=== Baby Products ===
- Pigeon Baby Softener
- Pigeon Baby detergent

=== Misc ===
- Humaid(Insect Killer)
- Dario & Hard-type Dario(Ironing Aid)
