= Pamela Pigeon =

New Zealand-British cryptographer

Pamela Mary Pigeon (15 September 1918 – 6 June 2009), a New Zealand-British cryptographer, was the first female commander in Britain's Government Communications Headquarters (GCHQ).

== Biography ==
Pigeon's father, Hugh Walter Pigeon, was an English-born surgeon who migrated between England, Wellington, New Zealand, and the Chatham Islands for many years before settling in Wellington. Her mother, Fanny Hensel Parker, was the daughter of the organist at Wellington's Anglican cathedral. Her older sister, Elizabeth, was born in 1906. Pamela grew up in Wellington, where she was educated at Chilton House, a private girls' day school, and Queen Margaret College. At the latter, she won awards for language and speech writing.

It's not known when she emigrated to Britain, although she was an undergraduate in Eton in 1939. However, during World War II she worked as part of a secret intelligence unit located in Marston Montgomery, a remote base in Derbyshire set up in 1941 as an outpost of RAF Cheadle. In c. 1943, she became the leader of a team of linguists who listened in on shortwave German naval and air force radio broadcasts to decode information on troop movements. The team also worked "fingerprinting individual German radios," identifying them through the fact that "each crystal at the heart of a radio oscillated slightly differently." Their work helped to sink the Bismarck, a crucial German battleship. GCHQ historian Tony Comer identifies this as a key moment in the war.

Pigeon married Clifford Lionel Wale in 1948, the couple had three children and both worked as teachers. Clifford died in 1979.

Pigeon died on 6 June 2009, aged 91.
