= Maria Vos =

Dutch painter

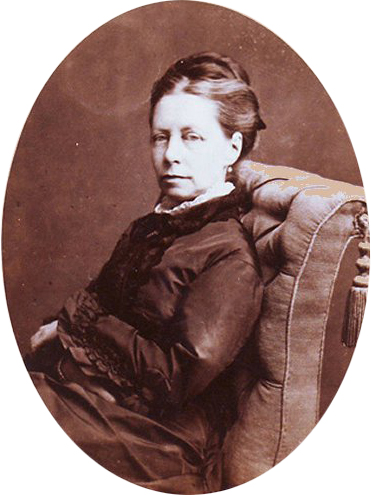
- Photograph from 1882
- Born: 21 December 1824; Amsterdam, Netherlands
- Died: 11 January 1906 (aged 81); Oosterbeek, Netherlands
- Partner: Adriana Johanna Haanen

Maria Vos (Dutch pronunciation: [maːˈrijaː ˈvɔs]; 21 December 1824 – 11 January 1906) was a Dutch still-life painter.

== Biography ==
She was born to the family of a stockbroker. She originally studied what would now be called "home economics" at a French boarding school in Weesp. But, as was common for upper-class young ladies at the time, she also received drawing lessons, from Christiaan Andriessen. Later, she studied painting with Petrus Kiers. In 1844, she had a showing at the Exhibition of Living Masters and, in 1847, became an honorary member of the "Royal Academy of Fine Arts" in Amsterdam.

She worked there until 1853, when she moved to Oosterbeek and joined a group of painters known as the Hollandse Barbizon. In 1863, her friend, Adriana Johanna Haanen, the sister-in-law of her teacher, Kiers, joined her there. Seven years later, they built a home known as the "Villa Grada", where they gave drawing and painting lessons. Haanen died in 1895, but Vos remained and became one of the last artists in residence there. On her eightieth birthday, she received a personal tribute from seventy members of Arti et Amicitiae.

Although Vos is primarily known for still lifes, she also did portraits, landscapes and cityscapes, including a series of watercolors depicting Oosterbeek. She mostly exhibited in the Netherlands and Belgium, but also had a showing at the Centennial Exposition in Philadelphia. Much of her work has been lost (or misplaced), but due to the sheer quantity of her output, much remains. Major retrospectives of her work were held in 1973 and 2002.

== Selected paintings ==
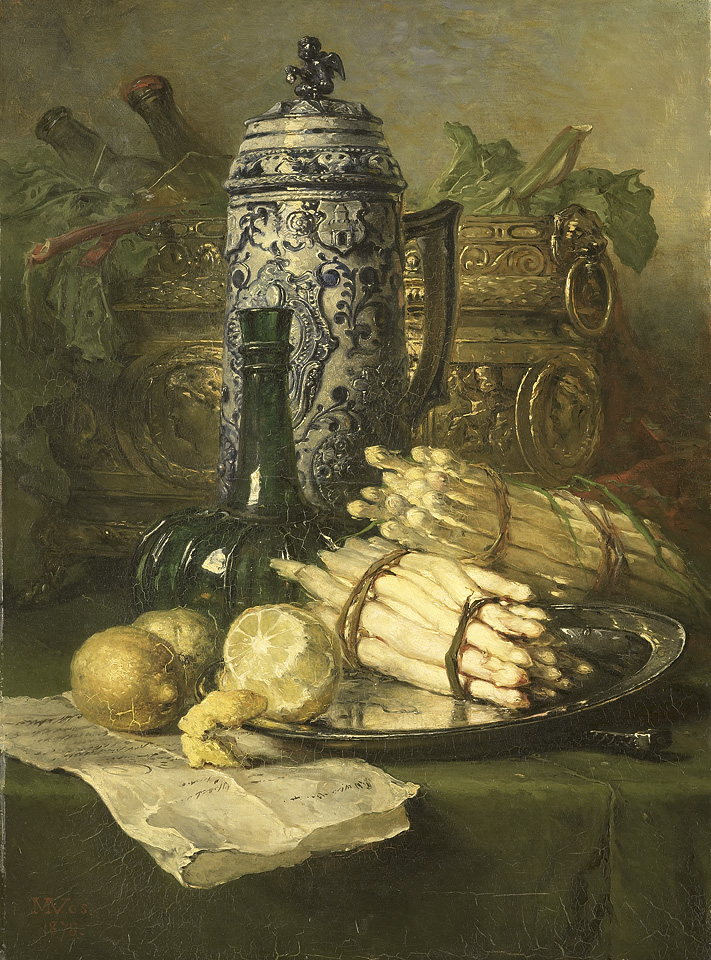
Still Life with Stoneware Mug

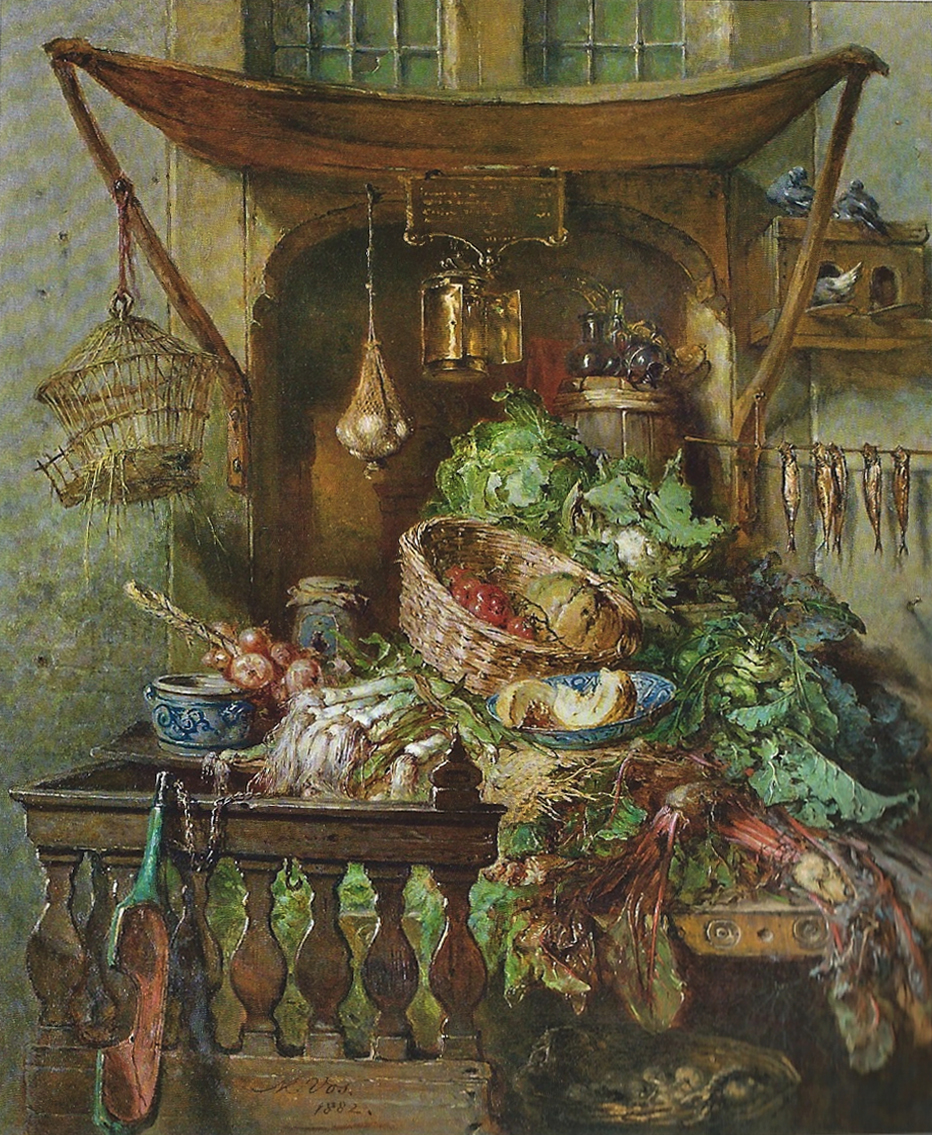
Vegetable Stall

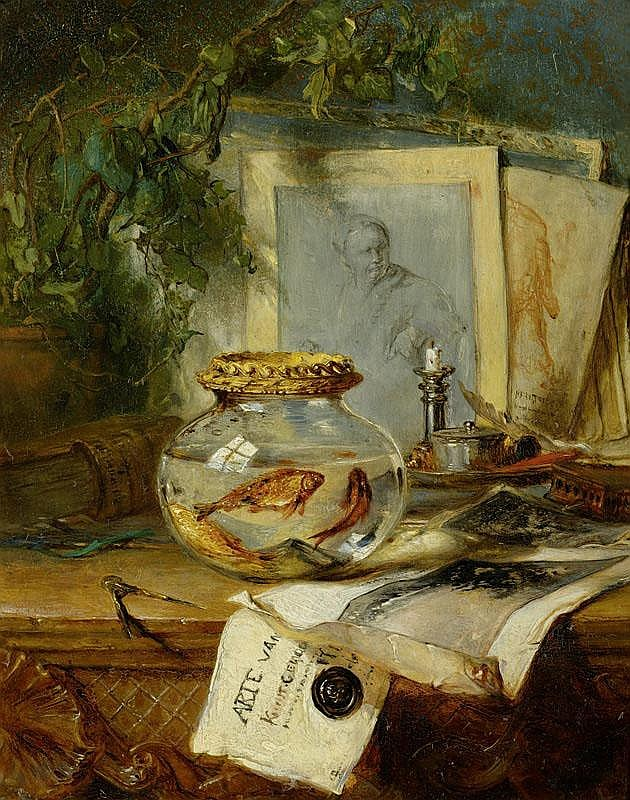
Still Life with Goldfish Bowl

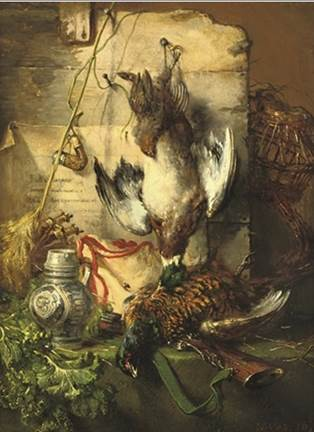
Hunting Still Life
