= Pigeon Lake =

Pigeon Lake may refer to:

- Pigeon Lake (Alberta)
- Pigeon Lake (Ontario)
- Pigeon Lake Wilderness Area, New York
