= Partridge Films =

Partridge Films (also known as Partridge Productions) is a British TV/film production company based in Bristol, England. It specializes in wildlife programs and is a part of United Wildlife, a United News and Media Company. The company is known for the children's series Animal Alphabet which aired on Nick Jr. and Channel 4.

The company was founded by Michael Rosenberg in 1974; during his time there Partridge Films produced some high quality wildlife documentaries such as “Etosha – Place of Dry Water”, “Fragile Earth” and "Korup – An African Rainforest"; Rosenberg won two Emmy Awards and the company won a Queen's Award for Export Achievement. In 1996, he sold his shares to UNMC.

On 7 May 2002, Michael Rosenberg was interviewed by Michael Bright in association with Wildscreen and the Wild Film History to provide an oral history of Partridge Films. The interview gave an in depth look of the foundation of Partridge Films to it becoming an archive and working with ARKive to share and educate the world about wildlife online. They also produced the Animal Alphabet show for children in 2002, now found in various online streaming platforms.
