= Pigeons (painting) =

Painting by Elisabeth Alida Haanen

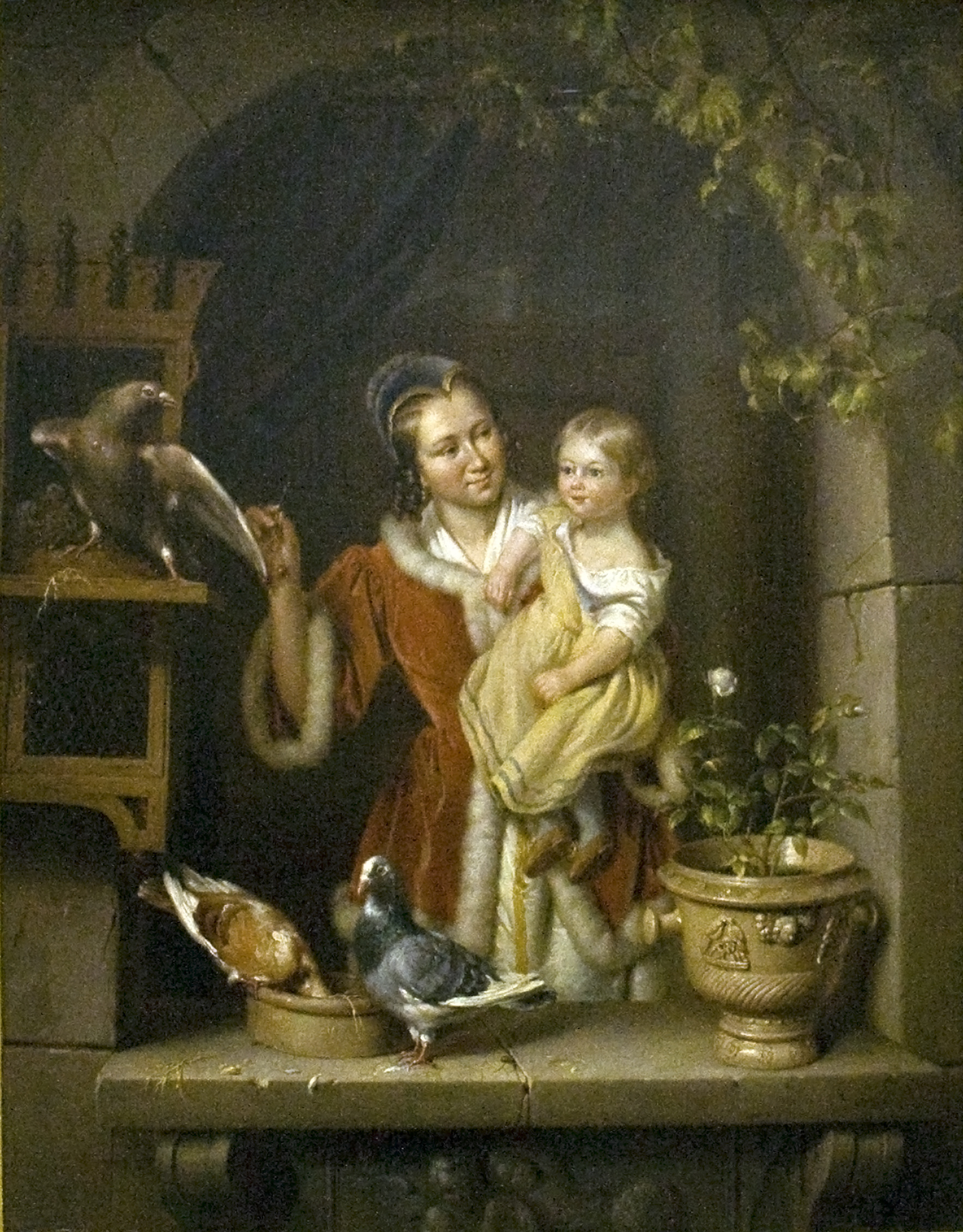
- Artist: Elisabeth Jerichau-Baumann
- Year: 1841
- Medium: Oil on canvas
- Subject: Mother and child and pigeons
- Location: Haarlem

Pigeons is an oil painting by the Dutch painter Elisabeth Alida Haanen (1809–1845). The painting depicts a mother and child feeding pigeons. The painting is on public display at the Teylers Museum in Haarlem, Netherlands.
