= Pigeon Island =

Pigeon Island may refer to:

- Pigeon Island (Houtman Abrolhos), Australia
- Pigeon Island (North Queensland), Australia
- Pigeon Island (Lake Ontario), Canada
- Pigeon Island, near Horse Chops Island, Labrador, Canada
- Pigeon Island (Grenadines)
- Pigeon Island (New Zealand)
- Pigeon Island (Saint Lucia)
- Pigeon Island (Solomon Islands)
- Pigeon Island National Park, Sri Lanka
- Güvercinada, Turkey
- Isla de Las Palomas, Spain
- Motueka Island (Pigeon Island), New Zealand
- Netrani Island, or Pigeon Island, Karnataka, India

== See also ==
- Pigeon Key, a small island in Florida, U.S.
- Pidgeon Island, Antarctica
