= Pigeon Mountain =

Pigeon Mountain may refer to:

- Pigeon Mountain (New Zealand)
- Pigeon Mountain (Alberta), a mountain in Seebe, Alberta, Canada
- Pigeon Mountain (Georgia), a mountain in Walker County

== See also ==
- Pigeon Peak, Colorado, United States
