= USS Pigeon =

Three United States Navy vessels have borne the name USS Pigeon, after the pigeon:

- USS Pigeon (AM-47) was a Lapwing-class minesweeper, launched in 1919, reclassified a Submarine Rescue Vessel (ASR–6) in 1929, and sunk in action in 1942.
- USS Pigeon (AM-374) was an Auk-class minesweeper, laid down in 1944 and struck in 1966.
- USS Pigeon (ASR-21) was the lead ship of her class of submarine rescue ship, laid down in 1968 and struck in 1992.
