= Jean Pigeon =

French physicist and mathematician

Jean Pigeon d'Osangis (born 1654, Donzy, Nivernais; died 1739) was a French physicist and mathematician, noted for the construction of planispheres.

He was also a globe maker. In the University of Wrocław's map collection, there survives one of only two remaining examples of a 7-cm terrestrial pocket globe that Pigeon published in 1717.

He was the father of Marie Anne Victoire Pigeon.

He was a member of the Paris Society of Arts.
