= Casparis Haanen =

Dutch painter, papercutter, and draftsman

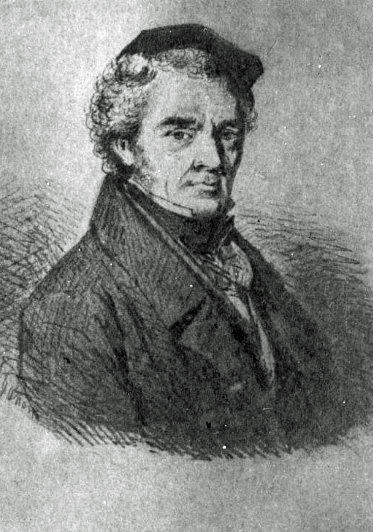
Casparis Haanen (1815)

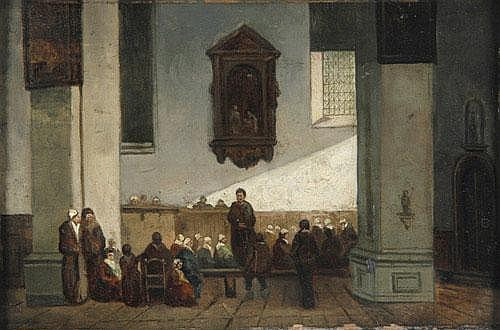
Church Interior

Casparis Haanen (baptized 17 June 1778, Bilzen - 25 January 1849, Amsterdam) was a Dutch painter, paper cutter and draftsman.

== Life and work ==
He lived in Utrecht until around 1830: interrupted around 1812/14 by a stay in Oosterhout, in Brabant. He settled in Amsterdam after 1830.

There, he became known for painting church interiors. In his later years, he also became an art dealer and did restorative work. A large collection of his silhouettes may be seen at the Rijksprentenkabinet.

Many of his other works are on display at the Rijksmuseum and the Kröller-Müller Museum.

Haanen was married to Isabella Johanna Sangster. Several of their children also became artists; namely, Adriana Johanna, Elisabeth Alida, George Gilles and Remigius Adrianus.

== Sources ==
- Documentatie Beeldende Kunst in Noord-Holland: Casparis Haanen
- Kramm, Christiaan, De levens en werken der Hollandsche en Vlaamsche kunstschilders, beeldhouwers, graveurs en bouwmeesters, van den vroegsten tot op onzen tijd, Amsterdam 1857 t/m 1864
