= Pigeon Township =

Pigeon Township may refer to:

- Pigeon Township, Baxter County, Arkansas, in Baxter County, Arkansas
- Pigeon Township, Vanderburgh County, Indiana
- Pigeon Township, Warrick County, Indiana
- Pigeon Township, Haywood County, North Carolina, in Haywood County, North Carolina
