= Cecil van Haanen =

Dutch painter (1844–1914)

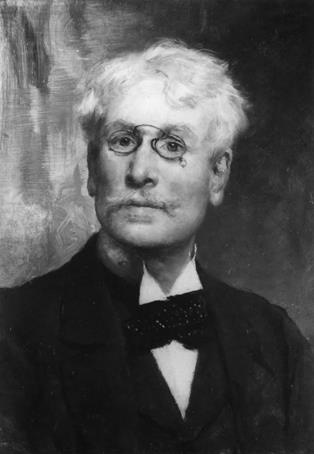
- Self-portrait
- Born: 3 November 1844; Vienna, Austria
- Died: 24 September 1914 (aged 69); Vienna, Austria
- Occupations: Painter, illustrator

Cecil van Haanen (3 November 1844 – 24 September 1914) was a Vienna-born Dutch portrait and genre painter, whose significant work was centred at Venice.

Van Haanen was the son to landscape painter Remigius Adrianus Haanen (1812–1894) and Emilie Mayer von Alsó-Rußbach. He received early artistic training from his father and Friedrich Schilcher, and from April 1854 was educated at the pre-school of the Vienna Academy under Peter Johann Nepomuk Geiger.

He attended the Karlsruhe Academy from 1863 to 1865, where he was taught by Ludwig des Coudres and Johann Wilhelm Schirmer. Later he was admitted to Karl von Piloty's school of painting in Munich, where he was taught by Hermann Anschütz, and became friends with the painter Wilhelm Leibl.

In 1866 he moved to Antwerp where he stayed for six years. Here he was taught by Jozef Van Lerius, who introduced him to history and portrait painting, and genre painting which became the significant oeuvre of his later painting in Venice. Although living largely in Venice from 1873, he spent time in London working as a magazine illustrator.

Cecil van Haanen died in Vienna and was buried in Vienna Central Cemetery.

== Bibliography ==
- Catalogue of valuable modern pictures and water-colour drawings, including nine pictures and drawings of H. Herkomer [...] seven works of C. van Haanen. W. Clowes and sons, London 1891
- A catalogue of a loan collection of pictures by C. van Haanen, and other oil paintings, by artists of the British and foreign schools. Thomas McLean's Gallery, London 1896.
- "Cecil van Haanen" in Allgemeines Künstler-Lexikon. Leben und Werk der berühmtesten bildenden Künstler, ed. Hermann Alexander Müller and Hans Wolfgang Singer, Literarische Verlagsanstalt Rütten & Loening, Frankfurt am Main 1921, p.112. Archive.org (in German)
- Cecil van Haanen. Albertina, Wien. Zeichnungen, Ölskizzen, Gemälde. Ausstellung Frühjahr 1955. Foreword by Otto Benesch. Schroll, Vienna 1955
- Digitalisat Haanen, Cecil(ius) van, in Österreichisches Biographisches Lexikon 1815–1950, Austrian Centre for Digital Humanities and Cultural Heritage (1958), p.116, (in German) ISBN 3700114834
- Röder, Gabriele: Digitalisat Studien zur künstlerischen Bedeutung Cecil van Haanens, University of Vienna, Faculty of Historical and Cultural Studies, MA thesis, 2002 (in German)
- Van der Mullen, M; Challenging boundaries. The Haanen family as a case study regarding material and immaterial exchange in the field of visual arts between the Netherlands and the German speaking world (1815 - 1860), Uetrecht 2010
