= Pierre Le Guay de Prémontval =

French mathematician and philosopher

André Pierre Le Guay de Prémontval (16 February 1716 – 2 September 1764) was a French mathematician and philosopher.

== Biography ==
He was born in Charenton-le-Pont on 16 February 1716.

In 1744, he was forced to flee France to Switzerland due to his criticism of Catholic doctrines, accompanied by his student Marie Anne Victoire Pigeon; on 30 June 1746, they married. Prémontval had been raised Roman Catholic, but had spent some time as an atheist and then deist; in Switzerland, Prémontval and his wife converted to Protestantism.

Later they moved to Berlin, where he was admitted to the Royal Prussian Academy of Sciences.

== Philosophical work ==
Prémontval criticised the empiricist theory of the self, arguing that there is a real distinction between an individual's personality and soul that is often ignored, and that our possession of the later is our justification for our interest in the former.

Prémontval’s hypothesis termed "psychocracy" proposed that there is real interaction between the body and soul, but it is an immaterial kind of influence as opposed to a physical kind.

== Selected publications ==
- Cause bizarre ou Pièces d'un procès ecclésiastico-civil, 1755. (Scanned copy at Google Books)
- Le Diogène de D'Alembert on Pensées libres sur l'Homme, 1755. (Scanned copy at Google Books)
- Discours sur diverses notions préliminaires à l'étude des mathématiques [Discourse on diverse notions preliminary to the study of mathematics], 1743. (Scanned copy at Google Books)
- Discours sur la nature des quantités que les mathématiques ont pour objet, 1742. (Scanned copy at Google Books)
- Discours sur la qualité du nombre, 1743.
- Discours sur l'utilité des mathématiques, 1742.
- L'esprit de Fontenelle on Recueil de pensées tirées de ses ouvrages, 1744, 1755, 1767.
- Le hasard sous l'empire de la Providence, 1754.
- Lettres contre le dogme de l'eucharistie tel qu'il est enseigné par l'Église romaine adressées en 1735 au fameux P. Tournemine jésuite.
- Mémoires, 1749.
- La monogamie ou L'unité dans le mariage, 1751. (Google Books Volume 1, Volume 2, Volume 3; German translation by Windheim, 1753: Volume 1, Volume 2, Volume 3)
- Panagiana Panurglca ou Le faux évangélîste, 1750.
- Pensées sur la liberté, 1750.
- Préservatifs contre la corruption de la langue française en Allemagne, 1761.
- Vues philosophiques ou Protestations et déclarations sur les principaux objets des connaissances humaines, 1757, 1761.
