= Hiram Paulding =

United States Navy rear-admiral

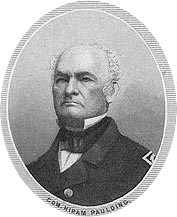
- Commodore Hiram Paulding
- Born: December 11, 1797; Cortlandt, New York, U.S.
- Died: October 20, 1878 (aged 80); Huntington, New York, U.S.
- Relatives: John Paulding (father)
- Military career
- Allegiance: United States
- Branch: United States Navy
- Service years: 1811–1870
- Rank: Rear admiral
- Commands: Shark; Levant; Vincennes; St. Lawrence; Home Squadron
- Conflicts: War of 1812; American Civil War

Hiram Paulding (December 11, 1797 – October 20, 1878) was a rear admiral in the United States Navy, who served from the War of 1812 until after the Civil War.

== Naval career ==
The son of John Paulding, Paulding was born in Cortlandt, New York. He was appointed Midshipman on September 1, 1811. During the War of 1812, he served on Lakes Ontario and Champlain, commanding the second division from Ticonderoga during the Battle of Lake Champlain. After the war he served in Constellation, off the Algerian coast, and in Independence, the brig Prometheus, and Macedonian.

On his return from service in Macedonian with the Pacific Squadron (1818–1821), he spent a year's leave at Capt. Alden Partridge’s Military Academy (later Norwich University), Norwich, Vermont. In the ensuing years of the decade he served in Sea Gull on the West Indies station, and in United States on the Pacific station. While serving on the United States Paulding was chosen to carry Commodore Hull's dispatches from Callao, Peru, to the mountain headquarters of General Simon Bolivar in the Andes; Paulding's journey of 1,500 miles on horseback was later recorded in his book, Bolivar in His War Camp. The following year he volunteered to serve under John "Roaring Jack" Percival in the Dolphin as that vessel pursued mutineers of the whaler Globe, then returned to United States. In 1830 he rejoined Constellation to serve as 1st Lieutenant, as she cruised the Mediterranean for two years, and in 1834 assumed command of the schooner Shark for another Mediterranean tour. Appointed to command the sloop-of-war Levant in 1838, he made a cruise in the West Indies and in 1841 became Executive Officer of the New York Navy Yard.

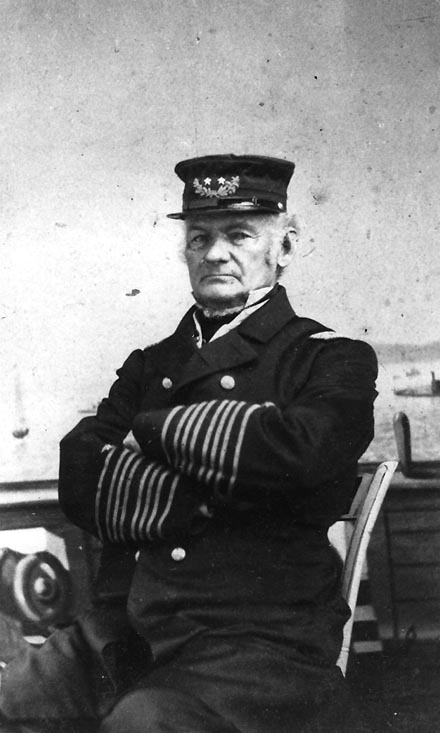
RAdm Paulding, commandant of the New York Navy Yard. (c. 1864–1865)

In 1844, Paulding was promoted to captain, and in 1845 he assumed command of Vincennes for a three-year East Indian cruise and took command of that station with the departure of Commodore James Biddle for the United States. Between 1848 and 1852 he commanded St. Lawrence in the Baltic, North, and Mediterranean Seas, then assumed command of the Washington Navy Yard.

Promoted to commodore, Paulding took command of the Home Squadron followed aboard the flagship Wabash. The squadron was instrumental in foiling the expedition against Nicaragua underway by the American William Walker, who had dreamed of uniting the nations of Central America into a vast military empire led by himself. Through insurrection, Walker became president of Nicaragua in 1856 when Costa Rica declared war to him. After his surrender to an allied Central American army and his return to the United States, Walker attempted for a military comeback when he was captured in 1857 by a landing of Home Squadron Marines. Stateside controversy over the questionable legality of seizing American nationals in foreign, neutral lands prompted President James Buchanan to relieve Paulding of his command, forcing him into retirement.

In 1861, Paulding was appointed by President Abraham Lincoln to assist in building up a wartime fleet. He then took over the New York Navy Yard. Paulding was assigned to evacuate ships from the Norfolk Naval Shipyard, which the Confederates planned to seize, in April 1861. Paulding found that Charles Stewart McCauley, commander of the navy yard, had ordered destruction of the ships. Paulding had to complete the work of burning and scuttling the largest number of the ships. He was able to remove the USS Cumberland, towed by the USS Pawnee. The USS Merrimack was burned to the waterline, but it was refitted latter as the CSS Virginia. In August 1861, Paulding was named by Secretary of the Navy Gideon Welles to the Ironclad Board, responsible for approving designs for and construction of ironclad warships. The result was the construction of USS New Ironsides, USS Galena and (most famously) USS Monitor.

After the war Paulding served as governor of the Naval Asylum at Philadelphia and as post-admiral at Boston. Paulding died at Huntington, Long Island, New York, 20 October 1878. He published a Journal of a Cruise Among the Islands of the Pacific (1831).

== Namesake ==
The destroyer USS Paulding (DD-22) was named in honor of Rear Admiral Paulding.

== See also ==
- Union Navy
- Confederate Navy
- CSS Virginia
- Ironclad warship
