= USS Percival =

USS Percival may refer to the following ships of the United States Navy:

- USS Percival (DD-298), was a Clemson-class destroyer commissioned in 1920 and decommissioned in 1930
- Percival (DD-452) was planned as an experimental destroyer, but the contract was canceled in January 1946. The machinery was used in USS Timmerman (DD-828)
