= Task Force 16 =

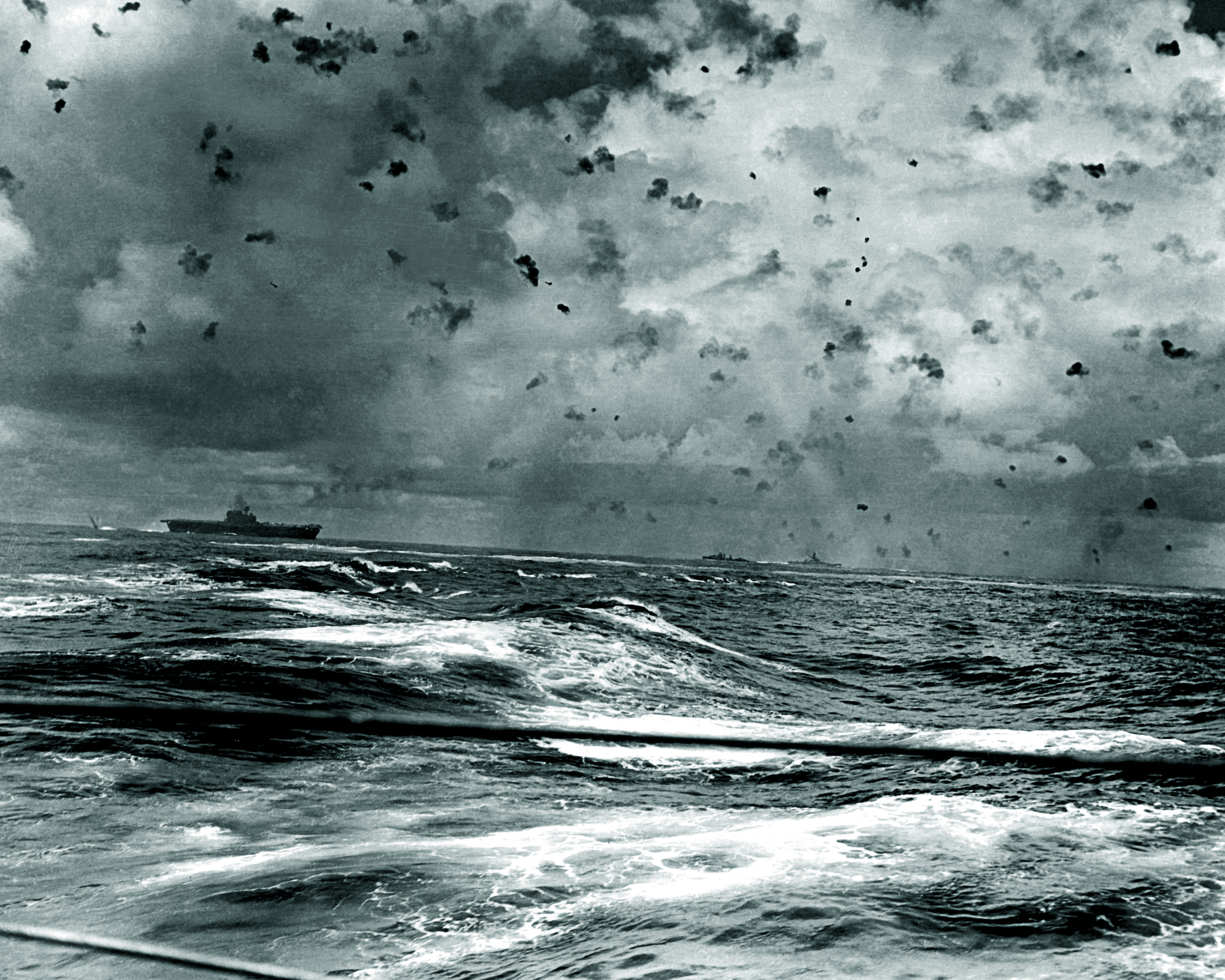
- Task Force 16 with Enterprise (center left) and battleship South Dakota (distant background) under Japanese carrier air attack during the great Battle of the Santa Cruz Islands on 26 October 1942.
- Country: United States
- Allegiance: Allies of World War II
- Branch: United States Navy
- Type: Carrier Strike Group
- Role: Aircraft carrier support
- Engagements: Marshalls-Gilberts raids Doolittle Raid; Battle of Midway; Battle of the Eastern Solomons; Battle of the Santa Cruz Islands; Naval Battle of Guadalcanal; Battle of Rennell Island

Commanders
- Notable commanders: William Halsey, Jr., Raymond A. Spruance; Thomas Kinkaid

The designation Task Force 16 (TF 16) was used for multiple units of the U.S. Navy during World War II. Prior to American entry into the war the designation was applied to an element of the U.S. Navy's Neutrality Patrols in the Atlantic, built around the battleship USS Mississippi. Next, In its most famous incarnation, in 1942-1943, it was built around the aircraft carrier USS Enterprise, and became one of the most storied task forces in the United States Navy, participating in a number of the most important battles of the Pacific War. Later still, after March 1943, when the Pacific Fleet was subdivided into a series of numbered fleets, the TF16 designation was applied to Service Force, Pacific Fleet, the main logistical organization supporting the fleet at sea; this version of TF16 was characterized as an element of the First Fleet, an administrative organization under the direct control of Admiral Chester Nimitz.

The first TF16 was created in the summer of 1941, after numerous vessels that had been transferred from the Pacific Fleet to the Atlantic as reinforcements arrived at Norfolk, and were promptly assigned to convoy escort duty. TF16 initially consisted of the battleship Mississippi, the heavy cruisers Quincy and Wichita, five destroyers, the auxiliary Semmes, the attack transport American Legion, the stores ship Mizar, and the amphibious cargo ship Almaack. This force was joined at sea by the carrier USS Wasp (CV-7) and her escorts, the destroyers O'Brien and Walke and, later, the heavy cruiser Vincennes. Wasp had been tasked with ferrying P-40 aircraft of the U.S. Army's 33rd Pursuit Squadron to Iceland to provide air cover for TF16s arrival and unloading, the initial stage in America's occupation of the island. After traveling as part of TF16 for a few days, on 6 August 1941 the carrier and her three escorts separated from the task force proper once again, sent the fighters (along with three training aircraft) on their way, and then returned to their home port of Norfolk. TF16, meanwhile, successfully unloaded the leading elements of the 6th Marine Regiment and cargo at Reykjavik before returning to port. The cargo vessels attached to TF16 made additional trips to Iceland over the latter part of 1941, but records are not clear as to when this version of TF16 was disbanded.

The Task Force was re-formed in mid-February 1942 around Enterprise (CV-6), with Vice Admiral William F. Halsey in command of the force, and supported by cruisers Salt Lake City (CA-25) and Northampton (CA-26), along with a half-dozen destroyers.

The task force's first mission was to shell Wake Island and Marcus Island, then, joined by Hornet (CV-8) and the rest of Task Force 18 (TF18), in April the force conducted the Doolittle Raid on Tokyo. In May Halsey was ordered to join Task Force 17 (TF17) in the Coral Sea, but the Battle of the Coral Sea was over before TF 16 could join in.

Halsey was then hospitalized with a skin disease, so Rear Admiral Raymond A. Spruance took over TF 16 and along with TF 17, led it to victory in the Battle of Midway.

In August, the task force supported the landings on Guadalcanal, then fought in the Battle of the Eastern Solomons, followed by the great Battle of the Santa Cruz Islands in October, the Naval Battle of Guadalcanal in November, and covered the retreat of TF 18 after the Battle of Rennell Island.

In March 1943, TG 16.6 fought the Battle of the Komandorski Islands, then bombarded Attu in April, and the whole force supported the recapture of the Aleutians in the Battle of Attu.

In 1944 and 1945, the task force was a refueling unit consisting of destroyer escorts and oilers.
