= USS Percival (DD-452) =

Canceled Fletcher-class destroyer

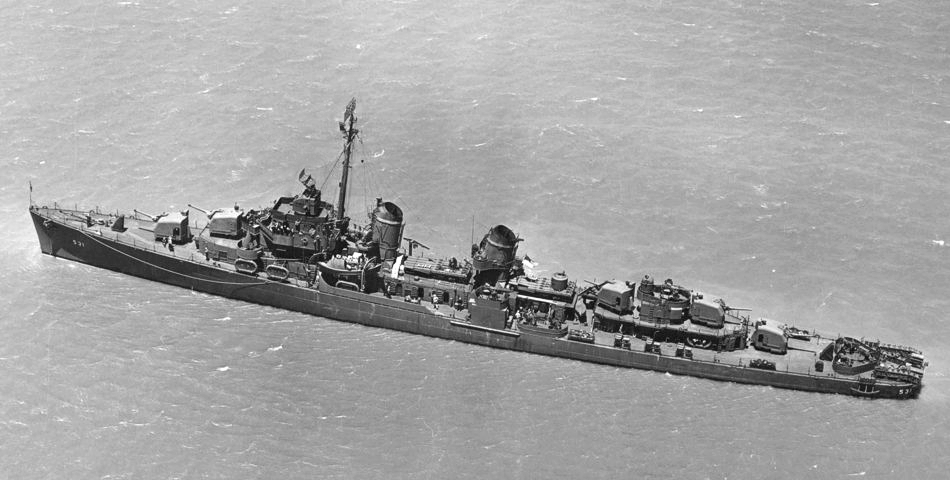
- USS Hazelwood, who would have had a near identical appearance to Percival

History

United States
- Name: USS Percival
- Namesake: John Percival
- Builder: Federal Shipbuilding and Drydock Company, Kearny, New Jersey (proposed)
- Fate: Construction contract cancelled 7 January 1946

General characteristics
- Class & type: Fletcher-class destroyer
- Displacement: 2,325 tons (standard); 2,924 tons (full load)
- Length: 369 ft 1 in (112.50 m) waterline; 376 ft 5 in (114.73 m) oa
- Beam: 39 ft 7 in (12.07 m)
- Draft: 13 ft 9 in (4.19 m) (full load)
- Propulsion: 60,000 shp (45,000 kW); experimental high pressure boilers; 2 geared steam turbines; 2 screws
- Speed: 35 knots (65 km/h; 40 mph)
- Range: 6,500 nmi (12,000 km) at 15 kt
- Complement: 70
- Armament: 5 × 5 inch (127 mm)/38 caliber guns; 1 × quad 1.1-inch (28 mm) autocannon mount; 4 × 20 mm guns; 10 × 21 inch (533 mm) torpedo tubes
- Armor: Side: 0.75 inch (19 mm); Deck over machinery: 0.5 inch (12.7 mm)

USS Percival (DD-452) was an experimental United States Navy destroyer who was never laid down and cancelled in 1946.

Percival and sistership Watson were planned to be a variation of the Fletcher-class destroyer, with Percival fitted with an experimental high-pressure boiler system and Watson designed to run on diesel engines, compared to the standard design of 4 oil-burning boilers.

She was contracted out to Federal Shipbuilding on 1 July 1940. Like her sistership, more pressing matters delayed their construction and were both canceled on 7 January 1946. After cancelation, her novel machinery was installed in USS Timmerman, a modified Gearing-class destroyer, for testing. Timmerman was able to produce 100,000 shaft horsepower (shp) and a top speed of about 40 knots compared to a standard output of 60,000 shp.
