= Grant F. Timmerman =

Medal of Honor recipient

Grant Frederick Timmerman
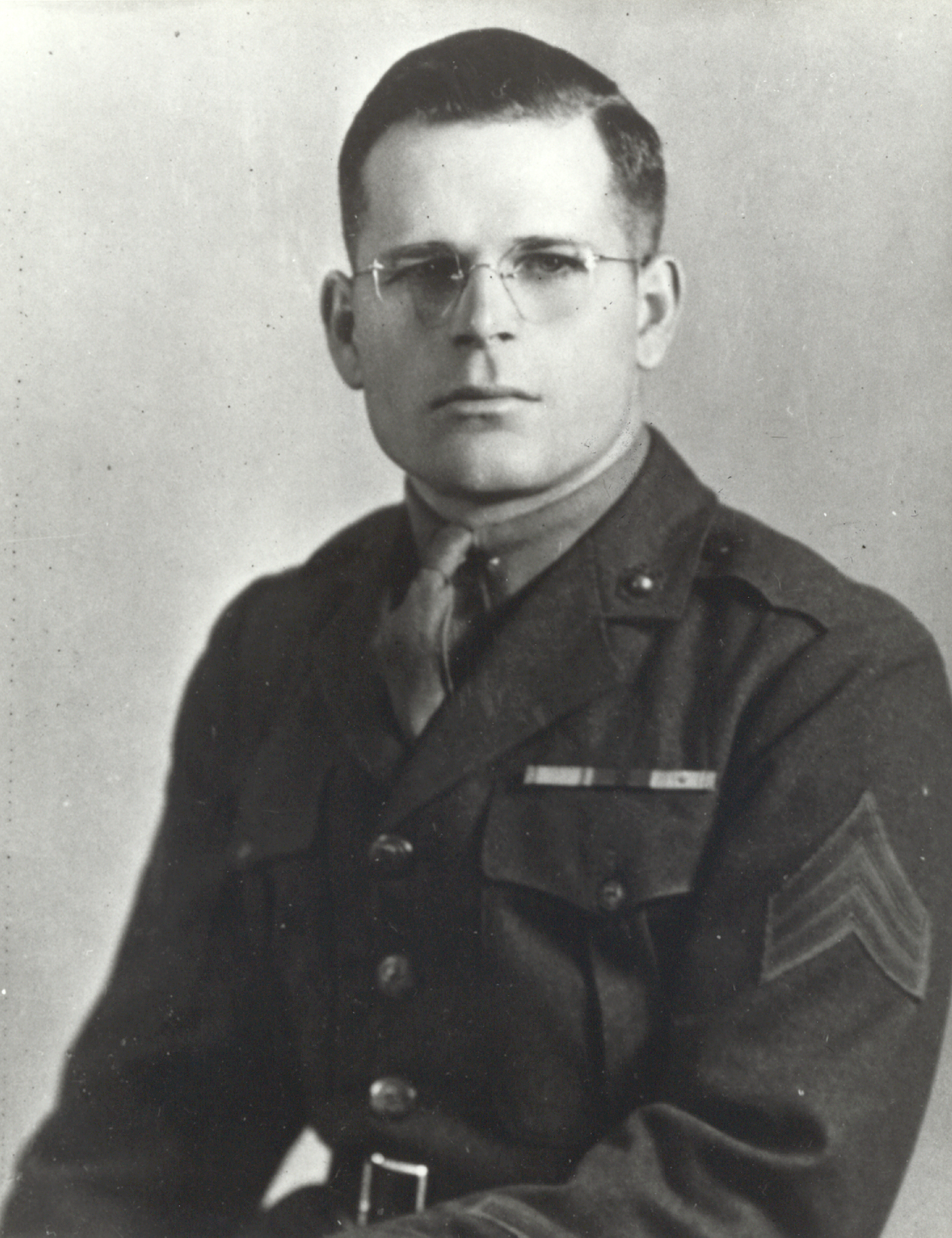
- Sgt Grant F. Timmerman, Medal of Honor recipient
- Born: February 19, 1919; Americus, Kansas
- Died: July 8, 1944 (aged 25); Saipan, Northern Mariana Islands
- Burial place: Initially the 2nd Marine Division Cemetery Saipan, Marianas Island; re-interred National Memorial Cemetery of the Pacific, Honolulu, Hawaii
- Military career
- Allegiance: United States of America
- Branch: United States Marine Corps
- Service years: 1937–1941; 1942–1944
- Rank: Sergeant
- Units: 2nd Battalion 6th Marines; 2nd Tank Battalion
- Conflicts: World War II: Battle of Tarawa; Battle of Saipan †
- Awards: Medal of Honor; Bronze Star; Purple Heart (2)

Grant Frederick Timmerman (February 19, 1919 – July 8, 1944) was a United States Marine who posthumously received the Medal of Honor for his heroic actions during World War II.

== Early years ==
Grant Timmerman was born in Americus, Kansas on February 19, 1919. Educated in the public schools of Emporia, Kansas, he graduated from Emporia High School in 1936. He played the saxophone in the high school band for two years, enjoyed hunting small game, and read, wrote, and spoke French and Russian. He attended Kansas State Teacher's College in Emporia for one year, where he took a pre-engineering course. In the summer of 1937, he went to California and worked as an electric welder at San Mateo, California.

== Military service ==
He enlisted in the United States Marine Corps in San Francisco on October 28, 1937, and went through United States Marine Corps Recruit Training at San Diego. His first assignment was at the Puget Sound Navy Yard in Bremerton, Washington. After a few weeks duty there, Pvt Timmerman went to Mare Island Naval Shipyard, California, where he boarded the old China transport, USS Henderson.

=== China ===
He crossed the 180th meridian on April 10, 1938, was duly initiated into the Imperial Domain of the Golden Dragon and arrived in Wusong, China, on May 5, 1938. Assigned to the Motor Transport Company of the 4th Marines, Pvt Timmerman served as a truck driver and as a motorcycle dispatch rider. Once in Shanghai, he and another Marine observed a white woman surrounded by a crowd of menacing Chinese. Immediately, he and his comrade dispersed the angry crowd and stood by until a policeman was summoned. The woman turned out to be the wife of a U.S. Navy commander. A Letter of Commendation and appreciation from the commander were added to Timmerman's record book.

It was July 1940 before Pvt Timmerman was promoted to private first class. When the usual 18-month tour of duty was completed, PFC Timmerman requested that his tour be extended. His request was granted and it was thirty-three months in all before he set foot on the California shore again. Returning to Mare Island in April 1941, he was given duty at the Naval Prison there and stayed at that post until his discharge at the completion of his four-year enlistment on October 27, 1941.

He went back to electric welding and got a job at the ship yard of the Bethlehem Steel Corporation in San Francisco, welding electrical fixtures and armor plates on destroyers. After five weeks of civilian life, the Japanese attacked Pearl Harbor and in February 1942, he reenlisted and was reappointed to his old rank of private first class.

=== World War II ===
Since he had only been out of the Marine Corps for four months, the 23-year-old China Marine did not have to repeat basic training, but was immediately sent to the Transport Company at the Marine Corps Base at San Diego. Five weeks later he went to San Francisco as a clerk in the office of the Commanding General of the Department of the Pacific, where he stayed two months. Next assigned to the 2nd Tank Battalion of the 2nd Marine Division, he was promoted to corporal in July, he was advanced to sergeant in October, and in November was once more on his way overseas. His battalion went to Wellington, New Zealand, and when he crossed the equator, Sgt Timmerman was initiated in the realm of King Neptunus Rex.

==== Tarawa ====
After a period of intensive training in Wellington, the 2nd Division made their landing on Tarawa, Gilbert Islands on November 20, 1943. However, it was two days later that Sgt Timmerman came in with the tanks. In December, they went to Hawaii for a rest and more training, and in May 1944 left for another combat mission — the last for Timmerman.

==== Saipan — Medal of Honor action ====
He landed on Saipan on D-Day, June 6, 1944, and on June 28, sustained a slight shrapnel wound in the right forearm. A few days later — on July 8, — Sgt Timmerman's tank, of which he was tank commander, was advancing a few yards ahead of the infantry when the attack was held up by a series of Japanese pillboxes and trenches. The sergeant had been firing the tank's antiaircraft gun during the vigorous attack but when progress was halted, he prepared to fire the 75 mm gun. Exposing himself to the enemy, he stood up in the open turret of his tank to warn the infantry to hit the deck because of the muzzle blast of the 75 mm. A Japanese grenade came hurtling through the air aimed in the direction of the open turret. Sgt Timmerman fearlessly covered the opening with his own body to prevent the grenade from killing his crew and the grenade exploded on his chest, killing him instantly. Although two members of the crew received slight wounds from the grenade, none were killed, all the larger fragments being taken by Sgt Timmerman. For that his country bestowed its highest honor upon him - the Medal of Honor.

The Medal and also a Bronze Star earned earlier in the Saipan campaign, were presented to his parents on July 8, 1945, the first anniversary of his death, in their home by Col Norman E. True of the Marine Barracks in Great Lakes, Illinois. This quiet informal presentation was made at the request of the Marine's mother.

Initially buried in the 2nd Marine Division Cemetery on Saipan, Marianas Island, Sgt Timmerman was later reinterred in the National Cemetery of the Pacific in Honolulu, Hawaii.

== Awards and honor ==
Timmerman's awards include:

	Medal of Honor	Bronze Star	
Purple Heart w/ 1 award star	Navy Presidential Unit Citation w/ 1 service star	Marine Corps Good Conduct Medal	China Service Medal
American Defense Service Medal w/ Base clasp	American Campaign Medal	Asiatic-Pacific Campaign Medal w/ 2 service stars	World War II Victory Medal

=== Medal of Honor citation ===
The President of the United States takes pride in presenting the MEDAL OF HONOR posthumously to

SERGEANT GRANT F. TIMMERMAN
UNITED STATES MARINE CORPS

for service as set forth in the following CITATION:

For conspicuous gallantry and intrepidity at the risk of his life above and beyond the call of duty as Tank Commander serving with the Second Battalion, Sixth Marines, Second Marine Division, during action against enemy Japanese forces on Saipan, Marianas Islands, on 8 July 1944. Advancing with his tank a few yards ahead of the infantry in support of a vigorous attack on hostile positions, Sergeant Timmerman maintained steady fire from his antiaircraft sky mount machine gun until progress was impeded by a series of enemy trenches and pillboxes. Observing a target of opportunity, he immediately ordered the tank stopped and, mindful of the danger from the muzzle blast as he prepared to open fire with the 75-mm., fearlessly stood up in the exposed turret and ordered the infantry to hit the deck. Quick to act as a grenade, hurled by the Japanese, was about to drop into the open turret hatch, Sergeant Timmerman unhesitatingly blocked the opening with his body, holding the grenade against his chest and taking the brunt of the explosion. His exceptional valor and loyalty in saving his men at the cost of his own life reflect the highest credit upon Sergeant Timmerman and the United States Naval Service. He gallantly gave his live in the service of country.

/S/ HARRY S. TRUMAN

=== Honor ===
- In January 1946, the Navy named one of its new Gearing class destroyers after Sgt Timmerman. The USS Timmerman (DD-828) was christened by his mother.

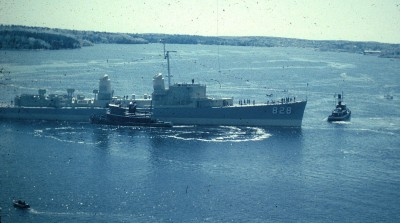
USS Timmerman in 1951.

== See also ==
- List of Medal of Honor recipients
