= Raymond A. Spruance =

United States admiral (1886–1969)

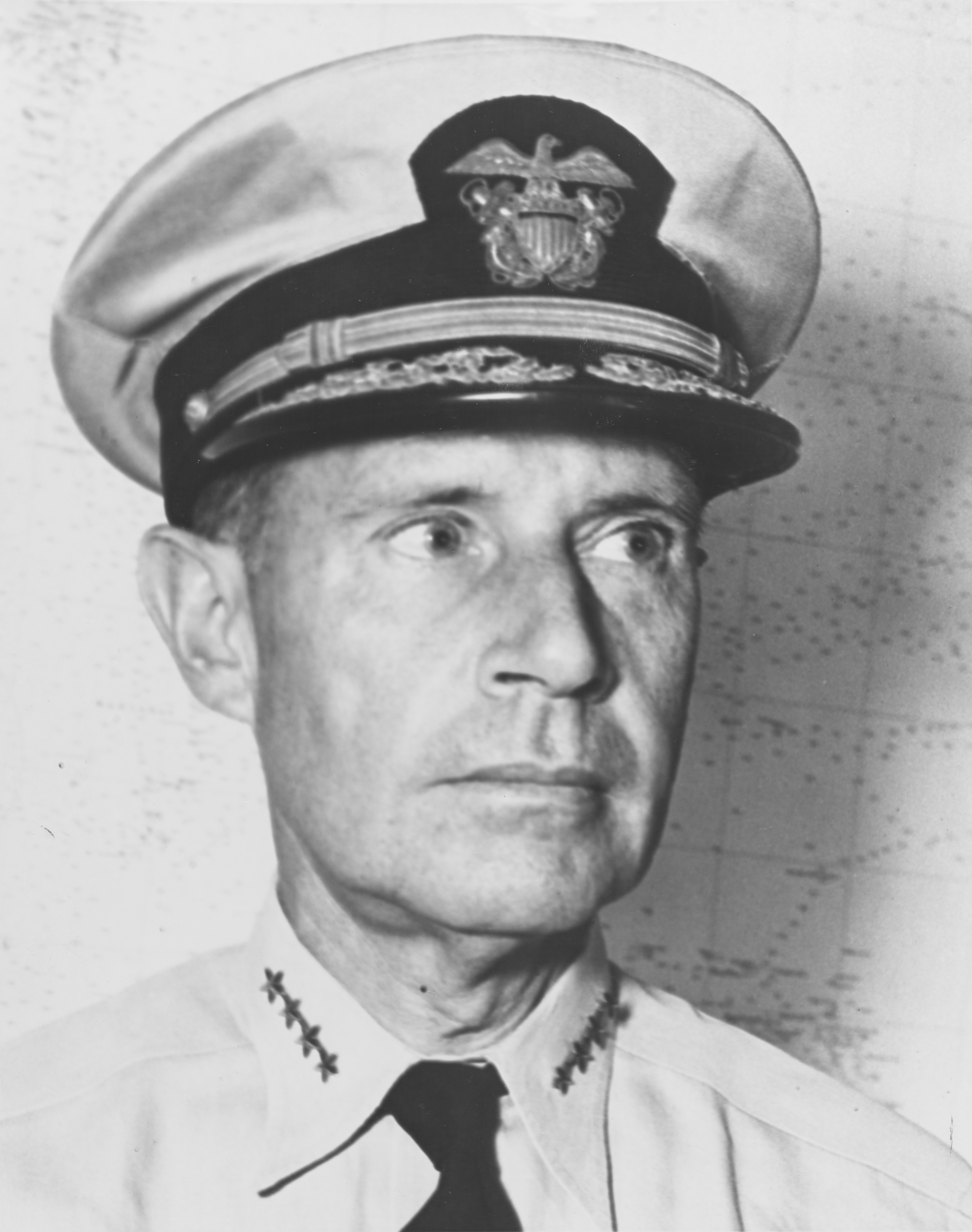
- Spruance in 1944
- Born: July 3, 1886; Baltimore, Maryland, US
- Died: December 13, 1969 (aged 83); Pebble Beach, California, US
- Burial place: Golden Gate National Cemetery, San Bruno, California (section C-1,3)
- Military career
- Allegiance: United States
- Branch: United States Navy
- Service years: 1907–1948
- Rank: Admiral
- Nickname: "Electric Brain" "Quiet Warrior"
- Commands: United States Fifth Fleet; United States Pacific Fleet
- Conflicts: World War I; World War II; Battle of Midway; Battle of Tarawa; Battle of Saipan; Battle of Tinian; Battle of the Philippine Sea; Battle of Iwo Jima; Battle of Okinawa
- Awards: Navy Cross; Navy Distinguished Service Medal (3); Army Distinguished Service Medal
- Other work: Ambassador to the Philippines

Raymond Ames Spruance (July 3, 1886 – December 13, 1969) was a United States Navy admiral during World War II. He commanded U.S. naval forces during the Battle of the Philippine Sea, one of the most significant naval battles of the Pacific Theatre. He also commanded Task Force 16 at the Battle of Midway, comprising the carriers Enterprise and Hornet. At Midway, dive bombers from American carriers sank four fleet carriers of the Imperial Japanese Navy. Most historians consider Midway the turning point of the Pacific War.

Official Navy historian Samuel Eliot Morison characterized Spruance's performance as "superb", and he was nicknamed "electric brain" for his calmness, even in moments of supreme crisis, a reputation enhanced by his successful tactics. He emerged from the war as one of the greater admirals in American history. After the war, Spruance was appointed President of the Naval War College, and later served as American ambassador to the Philippines.

== Early life ==
Spruance was born in Baltimore, Maryland, on July 3, 1886, to Alexander and Annie Hiss Spruance. He was raised in Indianapolis, Indiana. Spruance attended Indianapolis public schools and graduated from Shortridge High School. From there he graduated from the U.S. Naval Academy class of 1907 early on September 12, 1906, and received further, hands-on education in electrical engineering a few years later.

== Career prior to World War II ==
Spruance's first duty assignment was aboard the battleship USS Iowa, an 11,400-ton veteran of the Spanish–American War. In July 1907 he transferred to the battleship Minnesota and was aboard her during the historic around-the-world cruise of the Great White Fleet from 1907 to 1909.

Spruance's seagoing career included command of the destroyers Bainbridge from March 1913 to May 1914, Osborne, three other destroyers, and the battleship Mississippi.

In 1916 he aided in the fitting out of the battleship Pennsylvania and he served on board her from her commissioning in June 1916 until November 1917. During the last year of World War I he was assigned as Assistant Engineer Officer of the New York Naval Shipyard, and carried out temporary duty in London, England, and Edinburgh, Scotland.

Following his return to the United States, Spruance served aboard transport ship USS Agamemnon, before he was ordered to Bath Iron Works in Bath, Maine, for duty in connection with fitting out of destroyer USS Aaron Ward in March 1919. He commanded that vessel during the patrols with the Atlantic Fleet until January 1920, when he assumed command of newly commissioned destroyer USS Percival in San Francisco, California.

He commanded the Percival during the sea trials off the California coast and during the patrol cruises with the Destroyer Force, Pacific Fleet until May 1922, when he was ordered to Washington, D.C., for duty in the Bureau of Engineering under Rear Admiral John K. Robison. While in that capacity he assumed additional duty as a member of the board on doctrine of aircraft in connection with fleet fire control.

Spruance served in Washington until early 1924, when he was ordered to the headquarters, Commander Naval Force in Europe. He served as Assistant Chief of Staff under Vice Admiral Philip Andrews during the period of tensions between Greece and Turkey and was decorated with the Gold Cross of the Order of the Savior by the Government of Greece for his service.

Spruance ran a quiet bridge, without chit-chat; he demanded that orders be given concisely and clearly. In one incident a distraught officer rushed to report, "Captain, we've just dropped a depth charge over the stern!" "Well, pick it up and put it back," was Spruance's measured response.

He began attendance at the Naval War College in 1926, and graduated in 1927. Spruance served as executive officer of USS Mississippi from October 1929 to June 1931. He also held several engineering, intelligence, staff and Naval War College positions up to the 1940s. He served as an instructor at the Naval War College from 1935 to 1938. He commanded the battleship USS Mississippi from April 1938 to December 1939, when he was promoted to rear admiral. On February 26, 1940, Spruance reported as commandant of the 10th Naval District with headquarters at Naval Station Isla Grande in San Juan, Puerto Rico. On August 1, 1941, he finished his tour in Puerto Rico.

== World War II ==
=== Before Midway ===
In the first months of World War II in the Pacific, Spruance commanded the four heavy cruisers and support ships of Cruiser Division Five from his flagship, the heavy cruiser USS Northampton. His division was an element of the task force built around the aircraft carrier USS Enterprise and commanded by Vice Admiral William F. Halsey Jr. Early on, Halsey had led his task force on hit-and-run raids against the Japanese in the western Pacific: striking the Gilbert and Marshall islands in February 1942, Wake Island in March, and projecting the air power of the Doolittle Raid against the Japanese homeland in April. These raids were critical to morale — setting a new tone of aggressiveness by U.S. commanders while providing invaluable battle experience for the commanders and sailors of the U.S. Navy.

=== Midway ===
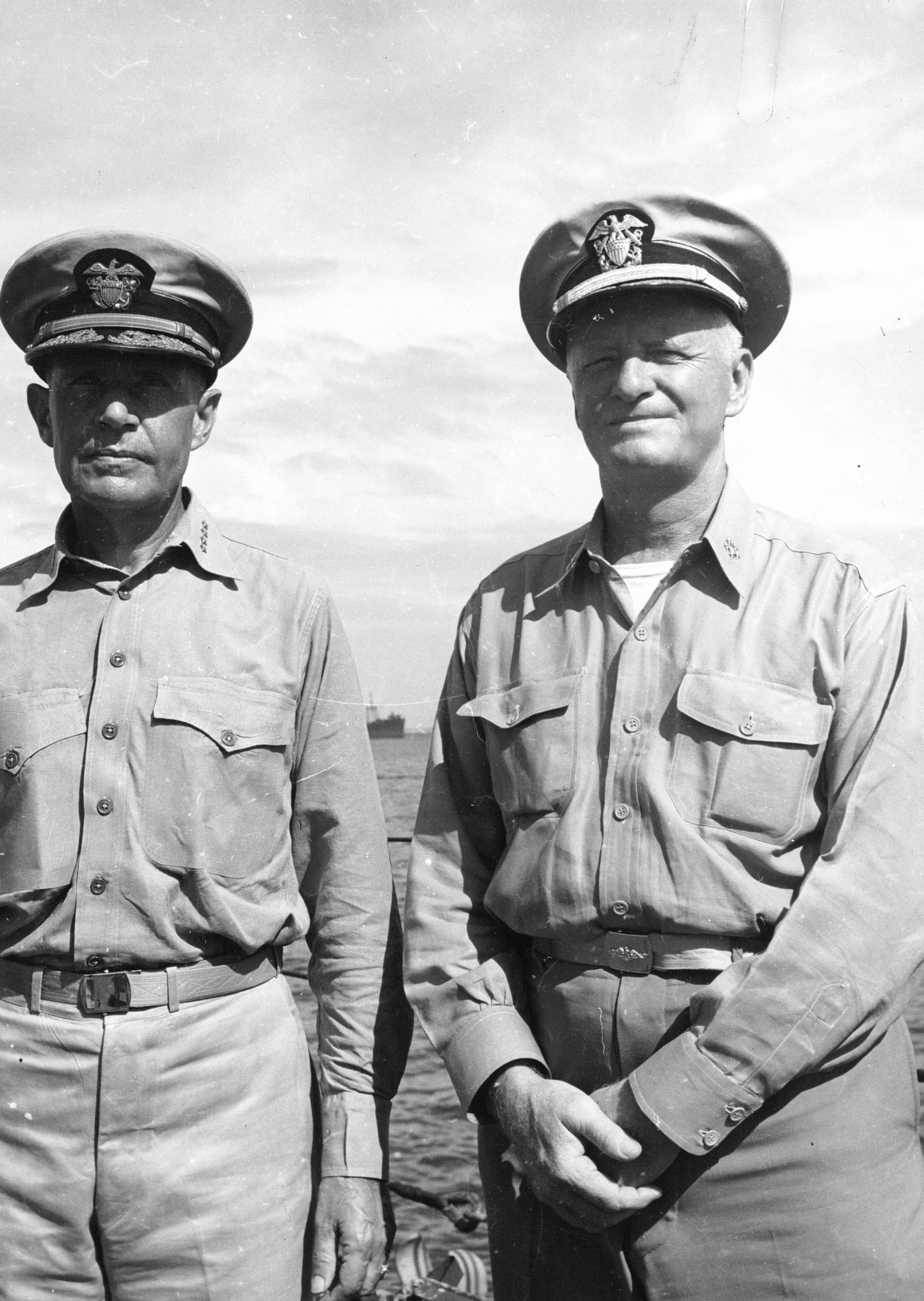
Spruance (left) next to Fleet Admiral Chester W. Nimitz (right), February 1945

During the third week of May 1942, U.S. naval intelligence units confirmed that the Japanese would—by early June—invade Midway Island. Capturing and occupying Midway was the brainchild-plan of commander-in-chief of the Combined Fleet, Admiral Isoroku Yamamoto. With it he intended to significantly expand the Imperial Japanese Navy's outer defense perimeter across the central Pacific; and, he believed, this very powerful stroke against Midway would so severely threaten Hawaii and Pearl Harbor that the U.S. government would be induced to sue for peace. On the other hand, commander-in-chief of the U.S. Pacific Fleet, Admiral Chester Nimitz knew he must intercept the Japanese invasion fleet, and that he must give battle to the enemy aircraft carriers before they could project their overwhelming power against the naval air station at Midway.

Fewer than two days before launch from Pearl Harbor, Nimitz's commander of the fleet carrier force, Admiral Halsey, was hospitalized with severe shingles; Halsey immediately recommended Admiral Spruance to Nimitz as his replacement with Admiral Frank Jack Fletcher receiving overall command. Although Spruance was proven as a cruiser division commander, he had no experience handling carrier-air combat; Halsey reassured Nimitz, and he told Spruance and Fletcher to rely on their newly inherited staff, particularly Captain Miles Browning, a battle-proven expert in carrier warfare. Spruance assumed command of Task Force 16 with its two carriers, USS Enterprise and USS Hornet, under battle command of Admiral Fletcher. Fletcher would command Task Force 17, but the task force flagship, USS Yorktown, had been badly damaged at the Battle of the Coral Sea and the formation's other carrier, Lexington, had been sunk, but at Nimitz's behest Yorktown was patched-repaired in "rush" time purposefully to join the Midway operation.

The U.S. Navy intercept force centered on the three carriers Enterprise, Hornet, and Yorktown, and their air-attack squadrons. It faced a Japanese invasion fleet organized into two groups: the air-attack task force of four carriers with support ships under command of Admiral Chūichi Nagumo, and the surface and occupation forces under Admiral Nobutake Kondō and others. Admiral Yamamoto commanded the combined invasion fleet from aboard his flagship Yamato.

At 0530 June 4, a scout plane from Midway sighted the Kido Butai; however, the scout only reported sighting "(t)wo carriers and battleships," and giving course and speed. Since US intelligence had reported the possibility that the Kido Butai would be operating in two separate task forces, that meant that Fletcher only knew the location of half of the carrier force. Armed with this information, Fletcher ordered Spruance to launch a strike at the Japanese with Enterprise and Hornet while holding Yorktown in reserve in case the other Japanese carriers were discovered. Since the Japanese planes were returning from the Midway strike, Spruance ordered that his strike be launched without delay so as to maximize the chances that the Japanese carriers would be caught while landing planes or spotting the next wave. In this state the Japanese carriers would be extremely vulnerable. Unfortunately, the launch plan for TF 16's strike groups had been conceived poorly. Aboard both carriers the escort fighters—the planes with the shortest range—were spotted so as to take off first, followed by the dive bombers and some of the torpedo bombers. Because of limitations in deck space, it had not been possible to spot the remainder of the torpedo planes on deck, but Capt. Browning wanted them to be included in the strike groups; so he ordered that the planes on deck be launched and then made to circle overhead, consuming fuel, until the remaining planes could be hoisted up to the flight deck and sent up to join them. Spruance, believing that the spotting and launch of the additional planes was taking too long (and putting the circling planes at risk of fuel exhaustion), decided to intervene, ordering that the squadrons that were circling depart for their targets before the strike group could form up properly, gambling that by doing so the attacks would arrive in time to disrupt the enemy carriers as they prepared to launch their own counterstrike. Though this gamble paid off, Enterprise air squadrons would pay a heavy price, flying in piecemeal, low on fuel, and mostly without fighter escort.

The battle commenced on the morning of June 4; the first several waves of U.S. attack aircraft were badly beaten, both near Midway and at sea around the Japanese task force. Then U.S. dive bombers from Spruance's Enterprise flew to Nagumo's fleet of four carriers – which, fatefully, were without air cover. Most of Nagumo's attack planes had just returned from the first strike on Midway and were immobilized in the carrier hangars, while his combat air patrol cover planes were engaged with battling torpedo bombers from Hornet. Enterprise dive bombers critically damaged two Japanese carriers including Nagumo's flagship Akagi; while the Yorktown air group, launched after Fletcher was confident that all Japanese carriers were accounted for, crippled the Soryu. All three were eventually scuttled.

Hiryū, the surviving carrier, gave the Japanese some brief respite by sending strikes that again damaged Yorktown. But several hours later—near the end of daylight hours—a U.S. scout plane located Hiryū again. Fletcher quickly ordered his dive bombers to strike, which fatally damaged the fourth Japanese carrier; it was scuttled the next day. However a second strike from Hiryū would fatally cripple Fletcher's flagship, Yorktown and as a result, Fletcher passed command to Spruance, who would command the mop-up phase of the battle.

The U.S. Navy counterforce sank all four Japanese carriers while losing one of its own, Yorktown. The repulse of the Japanese invasion fleet at Midway, and critically the destruction of the Kido Butai, allowed the U.S. to gain parity in the naval air war. In 1949, naval historian Samuel Eliot Morison noted that Spruance was subjected to criticism for not pursuing the retreating Japanese and allowing the surface fleet to escape. But in summing up Spruance's performance in the battle, Morison wrote: "Fletcher did well, but Spruance's performance was superb. Calm, collected, decisive, yet receptive to advice; keeping in his mind the picture of widely disparate forces, yet boldly seizing every opening. Raymond A. Spruance emerged from the battle one of the greatest admirals in American naval history". For his actions at the battle of Midway, Rear Admiral Spruance was awarded the Navy Distinguished Service Medal and cited as follows: "For exceptionally meritorious service ... as Task Force Commander, United States Pacific Fleet. During the Midway engagement which resulted in the defeat of and heavy losses to the enemy fleet, his seamanship, endurance, and tenacity in handling his task force were of the highest quality." Both Fletcher and Nimitz recommended Spruance for the Distinguished Service Medal for his role in the battle.

The Battle of Midway is considered by many to be a turning point of the war in the Pacific, along with the Guadalcanal campaign. Before Midway, a small and fractional U.S. Navy faced an overwhelmingly larger and battle-hardened Japanese Combined Fleet. After Midway, although the Japanese still held a temporary advantage in vessels and planes, the U.S. Navy and the nation gained confidence and, most critically, time. The setback in the Japanese timetable to encircle the Pacific gave the U.S. industrial machine time to accelerate war production, and ultimately, turn the advantage on Japan in the production of ships, planes, guns, and all the other matériel of war.

=== Commanding the Fifth Fleet ===
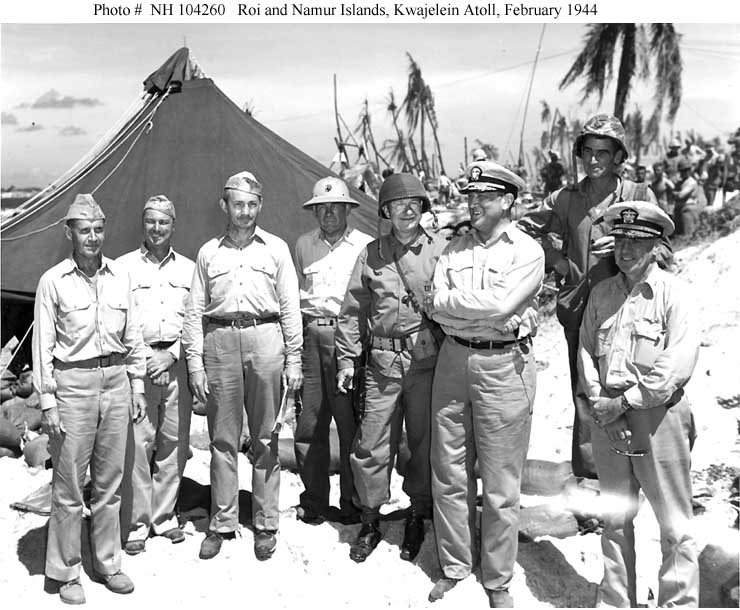
Kwajalein Invasion, February 1944. From left to right: Spruance, RADM Richard L. Conolly, Assistant Secretary of the Navy James Forrestal, MG Harry Schmidt, MG Holland M. Smith, VADM Ben Moreell, LTC Evans Carlson, and RADM Charles A. Pownall.

Shortly after the Midway battle, Spruance became chief of staff to Admiral Nimitz, and in September 1942 was appointed as Deputy Commander in Chief of the Pacific Fleet.

On August 5, 1943, Spruance was placed in command of the Central Pacific Force, which, on April 29, 1944, was redesignated as the Fifth Fleet. At that time, Admiral Nimitz instituted a unique arrangement in which the command of the vessels which made up the "Big Blue Fleet" alternated between Admiral William Halsey Jr., at which time it was identified as the Third Fleet and Task Force 38, and Admiral Spruance, when it became the Fifth Fleet and Task Force 58. When not in command of the fleet the admirals and their staffs were based at Pearl Harbor and planned future operations.

The two admirals were a contrast in styles. Halsey was aggressive and a risk taker. Spruance was calculating and cautious. Notwithstanding their different personalities, Spruance and Halsey were close friends. In fact, Spruance had a knack for getting along with difficult people, including his friend Admiral Kelly Turner, the hotheaded commander of 5th Fleet's amphibious force. One exception was Admiral John Towers, a constant critic of Spruance, whom Spruance came to despise for his naked ambition.

Most common sailors were proud to serve under Halsey; most higher-ranking officers preferred to serve under Spruance. Captain George C. Dyer of the light cruiser Astoria, who served under both Spruance and Halsey, summed up the view of many ship captains:

My feeling was one of confidence when Spruance was there. When you moved into Admiral Halsey's command from Admiral Spruance's … you moved [into] an area in which you never knew what you were going to do in the next five minutes or how you were going to do it, because the printed instructions were never up to date.... He never did things the same way twice. When you moved into Admiral Spruance's command, the printed instructions were up to date, and you did things in accordance with them.

This gave rise to the description of Spruance as "an Admiral's admiral".

Spruance directed Operation Hailstone against the Japanese naval base Truk in February 1944 in which twelve Japanese warships, thirty-two merchant ships and 249 aircraft were destroyed. This occurred at the same time that Admiral Turner's forces were attacking Eniwetok Atoll in the Marshalls, about 700 miles to the east. Spruance himself directed a task group of battleships, cruisers and destroyers that left the main body to go after Japanese ships that were fleeing Truk, sinking the light cruiser Katori and destroyer Maikaze. This was said to be the first time that a four-star admiral took part in a sea action aboard one of the ships engaged. Admiral Spruance commanded with deadly precision, reported an observer.

=== Battle of the Philippine Sea ===
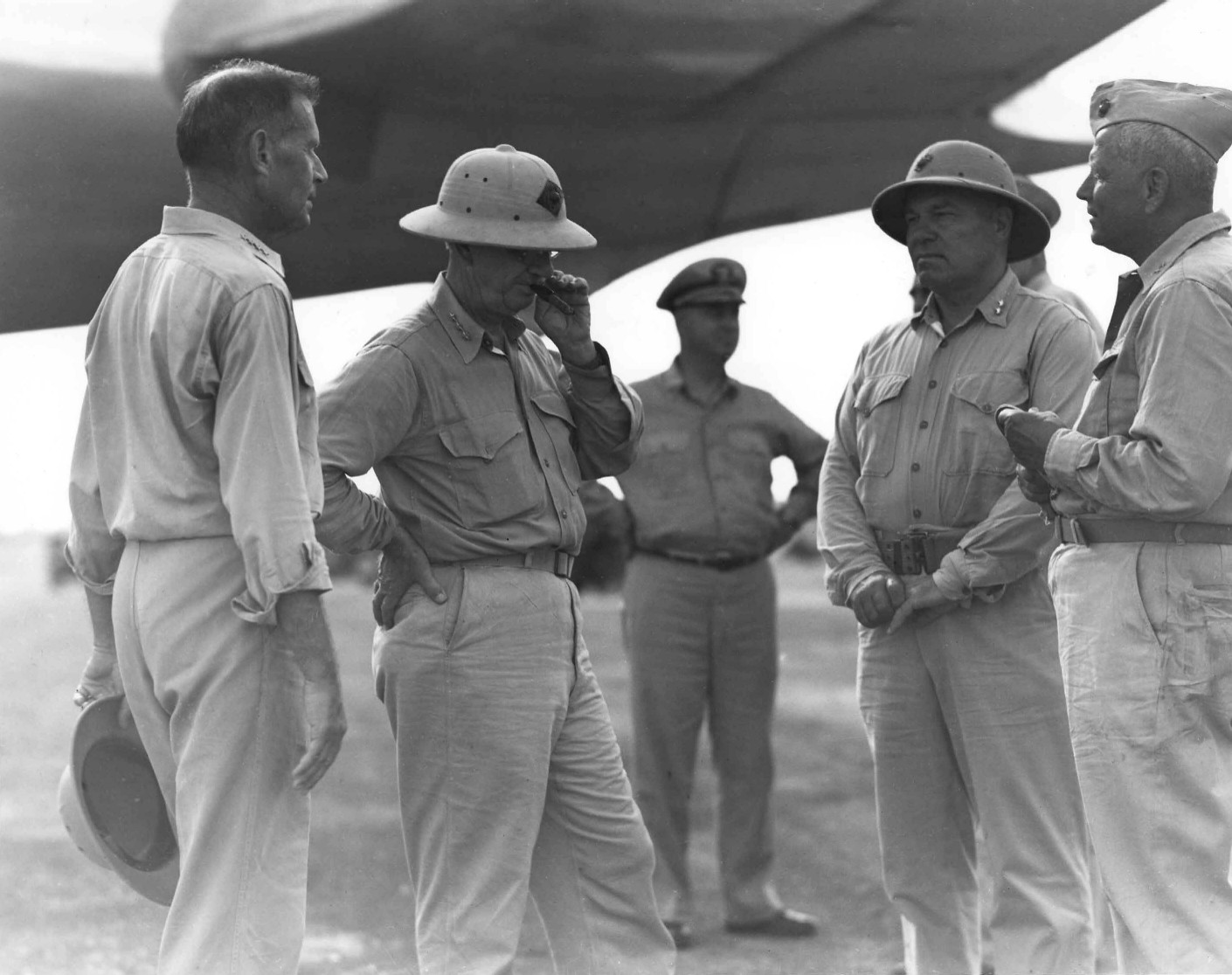
Spruance (left) with Marine generals following the recapture of Guam on August 1, 1944. Others are LTG Holland M. Smith (FMFPac), MG Henry L. Larsen, Island Commander, MG Roy S. Geiger, (III Amphibious Corps).

While screening the American invasion of Saipan in June 1944, Spruance defeated the Japanese fleet in the Battle of the Philippine Sea. Although he broke the back of the Japanese naval air force by sinking three carriers, two oilers and destroying about 600 enemy airplanes (so many that the remaining Japanese carriers were used solely as decoys in the Battle of Leyte Gulf a few months later due to the lack of aircraft and aircrews to fly them) Spruance has been criticized for not being aggressive enough in exploiting his success in the Philippine Sea. Buell quotes Spruance speaking with Morison:

As a matter of tactics I think that going out after the Japanese and knocking their carriers out would have been much better and more satisfactory than waiting for them to attack us, but we were at the start of a very important and large amphibious operation and we could not afford to gamble and place it in jeopardy.

However, his actions were both praised and understood by the main persons ordering and directly involved in the battle. Admiral Ernest J. King, the Chief of Naval Operations, said to him "Spruance, you did a damn fine job there. No matter what other people tell you, your decision was correct." Spruance's fast carrier commander, Marc Mitscher, told his chief of staff Arleigh Burke:

You and I have been in many battles, and we know there are always some mistakes. This time we were right because the enemy did what we expected him to do. Admiral Spruance could have been right. He's one of the finest officers I know of. It was his job to protect the landing force....

=== End of WWII ===
For most of the war, Spruance preferred to use the heavy cruiser USS Indianapolis, named for his hometown, as his flagship. He shifted his flag to the old battleship USS New Mexico of the shore bombardment force after Indianapolis was struck by a torpedo between Guam and the Philippines. When New Mexico was struck by two kamikazes on the night of May 12, 1945, a hasty search by Spruance's staff found the admiral manning a fire hose amidship. Determining that New Mexico was not too badly damaged to remain on station, Spruance kept her as his flagship. Spruance later chose the battleship USS New Jersey as his flagship, as the huge Iowa-class battleship had both room for his staff and the speed to keep up with the fast carrier task forces.

Spruance received the Navy Cross for his actions at Iwo Jima and Okinawa.

Spruance succeeded Fleet Admiral Chester Nimitz as Commander in Chief, U.S. Pacific Fleet and Pacific Ocean Areas in November 1945, a few months after the end of the war.

On October 16, 1946, the former Secretary of War, Robert P. Patterson, presented the Army Distinguished Service Medal to Admiral Spruance, with citation as follows:

Admiral Raymond A. Spruance, U.S. Navy, as Task Force Commander during the capture of the Marshall and Marianas Islands, rendered exceptionally meritorious and distinguished services from January to June 1944. During the joint operations leading to the assault and capture of the important enemy bases, complete integration of Army and Navy units was accomplished under his outstanding leadership, enabling all the forces to perform their closely co-ordinated missions with outstanding success.

== Post-war ==
=== Retirement ===
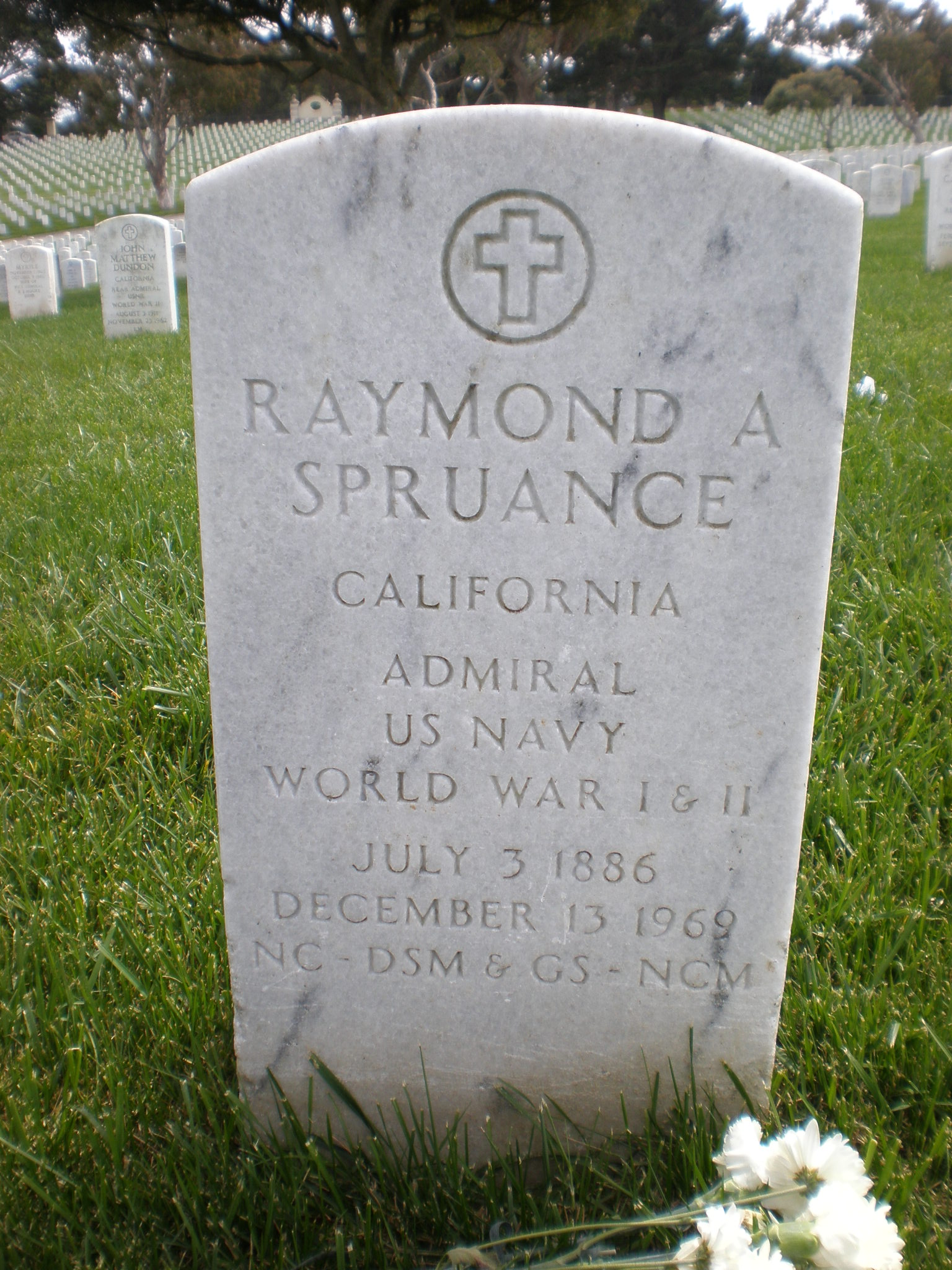
Spruance's headstone at Golden Gate National Cemetery

Toward the end of the Second World War Congress created a limited number of five-star ranks for the Army and the Navy, designated General of the Army and Fleet Admiral. The Navy, by law, was limited to four fleet admirals; three of these appointments were obvious: Ernest King, Chester Nimitz and William Leahy. The fourth was a choice between Halsey and Spruance, and after much deliberation, eventually Halsey was appointed in December 1945. Spruance's achievements were acknowledged by the unique distinction of a special act of Congress awarding him Admiral's full pay for life. Spruance expressed his personal feelings on this matter as follows:

So far as my getting five star rank is concerned, if I could have got it along with Bill Halsey, that would have been fine; but, if I had received it instead of Bill Halsey, I would have been very unhappy over it.

Spruance was President of the Naval War College from February 1946 until he retired from the Navy in July 1948. He was decorated with Order of Leopold and Croix de guerre with Palm by the Government of Belgium for his service for the Allied cause.

Shortly before his retirement, Spruance received the following Letter of Commendation from the Secretary of the Navy:

Your brilliant record of achievement in World War II played a decisive part in our victory in the Pacific. At the crucial Battle of Midway your daring and skilled leadership routed the enemy in the full tide of his advance and established the pattern of air-sea warfare which was to lead to his eventual capitulation...

=== Later life ===
He was appointed as Ambassador to the Philippines by President Harry S. Truman, and served there from 1952 to 1955.

He received his Doctor of Jurisprudence (J.D.), honoris causa degree from Central Philippine University in 1955, an institution of higher learning founded by the American Baptist missionary William Orison Valentine in 1905.

Spruance died in Pebble Beach, California, on December 13, 1969, and was buried with full military honors at Golden Gate National Cemetery near San Francisco. His wife, Margaret Dean (1888–1985), is buried alongside him, as are Fleet Admiral Chester Nimitz, his longtime friend Admiral Richmond K. Turner, and Admiral Charles A. Lockwood, an arrangement made by all of them while living. He was the grandfather of theatre director Anne Bogart.

== Personality ==
Spruance was an active man who thought nothing of walking eight or 10 miles a day. He was fond of symphonic music, and his tastes were generally simple. He never smoked, and drank little. He enjoyed hot chocolate and would make it for himself every morning. Besides his family, he loved the companionship of his pet schnauzer, Peter. Fit into his 70s, Spruance spent most of his retirement days wearing old khakis and work shoes and working in his garden and greenhouse; he loved to show them to visitors.

His achievements in the navy were well known, but himself much less. He did not discuss his private life, feelings, prejudices, hopes or fears, except with his family and his closest friends. He was modest and candid about himself. "When I look at myself objectively," he wrote in retirement, "I think that what success I may have achieved through life is largely due to the fact that I am a good judge of men. I am lazy, and I never have done things myself that I could get someone to do for me. I can thank heredity for a sound constitution, and myself for taking care of that constitution." About his intellect he was equally unpretentious: "Some people believe that when I am quiet that I am thinking some deep and important thoughts, when the fact is that I am thinking of nothing at all. My mind is blank."

== Legacy ==
The destroyers Spruance (DD-963), lead ship of the Spruance class of destroyers, and Spruance (DDG-111), 61st ship of the Arleigh Burke class of destroyers, were named in his honor.

The main auditorium of the U.S. Naval War College, Newport, Rhode Island, is named Spruance Hall. A bust of Spruance is in the lobby.

== Cultural depictions ==
Spruance was portrayed by Glenn Ford (a US Naval Reserve officer himself) in the 1976 film Midway, Madison Mason in the 2001 film Pearl Harbor and Jake Weber in the 2019 film Midway.

Spruance is depicted as the controversial victor of Midway by G. D. Spradlin in the 1988 TV miniseries War and Remembrance. He is shown to be at loggerheads with his staff on numerous occasions and corrected by them once. The series, based on Herman Wouk's book of the same name, shows Spruance's decision to end the battle and retreat rather than confront the rest of the Japanese fleet as having been opposed by his subordinates, and he was mocked behind his back as "lacking the stomach." Yet the decision is hailed by the series's narrator as instrumental in sealing the American victory. Wouk writes in his book that "Spruance escaped [the Japanese fleet admiral] Yamamoto's terrible trap by acting on perfect military instinct. Not till many months later did American intelligence ferret out the facts."

== Awards ==
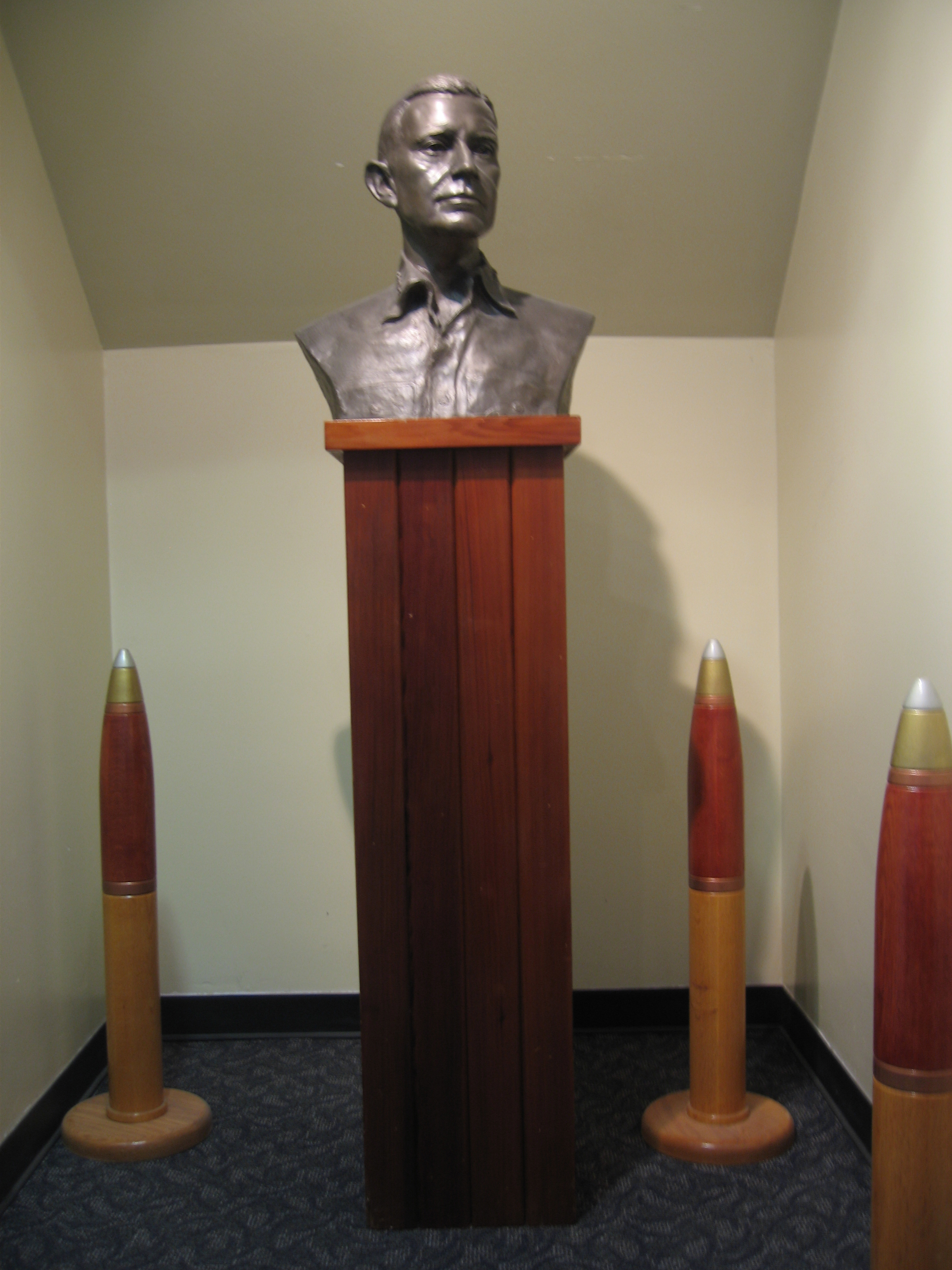
Bust of Admiral Spruance, located in Spruance Hall at the U.S. Naval War College

1st Row	Navy Cross	Navy Distinguished Service Medal with two 5/16" Gold Stars	Army Distinguished Service Medal
2nd Row	Navy Commendation Medal	Presidential Unit Citation with one star	World War I Victory Medal with "Overseas" clasp
3rd Row	American Defense Service Medal with "Fleet" clasp	Asiatic-Pacific Campaign Medal with eight 3/16-inch battle stars	World War II Victory Medal
4th Row	Navy Occupation Medal with "Asia" clasp	Philippine Liberation Medal with two stars	Gold Cross of the Order of the Savior (Greece)
5th Row	Knight Commander of the Order of the Bath (United Kingdom)	Grand Officer of the Order of Leopold (Belgium)	Croix de Guerre with Palm (Belgium)

== Dates of rank ==
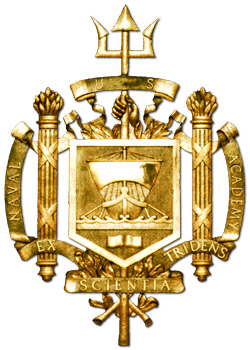
United States Naval Academy Midshipman – July 2, 1903, Passed Midshipman – September 26, 1906

Ensign	Lieutenant junior grade	Lieutenant	Lieutenant commander	Commander
O-1	O-2	O-3	O-4	O-5
September 13, 1908	September 13, 1911	October 2, 1913	August 31, 1917 (temporary) July 23, 1918 (permanent)	September 21, 1918 (temporary) February 1, 1922 (permanent)

Captain	Commodore	Rear admiral	Vice admiral	Admiral
O-6	O-7	O-8	O-9	O-10
June 30, 1932 (permanent)	Never held	June 1, 1939 (temporary) October 1, 1940 (permanent)	May 15, 1943	February 4, 1944 (temporary) June 26, 1948 (permanent)

Military offices
New title	Commander of the United States Fifth Fleet; 1944–1945	Succeeded by John Henry Towers
Preceded by Chester W. Nimitz	Commander in Chief of the United States Pacific Fleet; 1945–1946	Succeeded by John Henry Towers
Preceded by William S. Pye	President of the Naval War College; 1946–1948	Succeeded by Donald B. Beary
Diplomatic posts
Preceded by Myron M. Cowen	U.S. Ambassador to the Philippines; 1952–1955	Succeeded by Homer Ferguson
