= Globe (1815 whaleship) =

1815 American whaleship

History

United States
- Name: Globe
- Owner: C. Mitchell, & Co.
- Builder: Nantucket
- Launched: 1815
- Out of service: 1828
- Fate: Broken up c.1830

General characteristics
- Tons burthen: 29342/94 (bm)
- Length: 94 ft 0 in (28.7 m)
- Beam: 26 ft 9 in (8.2 m)
- Depth of hold: 13 ft 4 in (4.1 m)
- Notes: Two decks & three masts

The whaler Globe, of Nantucket, Massachusetts, was launched in 1815. She made three whaling voyages and then in 1824, on her fourth, her crew mutinied, killing their officers. Eventually most of the mutineers were killed or captured and the vessel herself was back in Nantucket in her owners' hands. She continued to whale until about 1828. She was broken up circa 1830.

== Early career ==
Globe made three whaling voyages (1815–18, 1818–21, and 1821–22), under Captain George Washington Gardner.

1st whaling voyage (1815–1818): On this voyage she became the first vessel to return with 2000 barrels of oil. Globe sailed from Nantucket on 4 October 1815, bound for the Pacific. She returned on 1 January 1818 with 1890 barrels of sperm oil and 125 barrels of whale oil.

2nd whaling voyage (1818–1820): Captain Gardner sailed from Nantucket on 3 March 1818, bound for the Pacific. Globe returned on 29 May 1820 with 2090 barrels of sperm oil.

3rd whaling voyage (1820–1822): Captain George W. Gardner sailed from Nantucket on 9 August 1820, bound for the Pacific. The vessel called at Honolulu on 21 April 1821 and anchored at Wyteetee Bay. The vessel called at Honolulu again from 12 to 28 November 1821. While ashore the crew helped to extinguish a fire. Globe returned to Nantucket on 3 May 1822 with only 250 barrels of sperm oil.

On his return, Captain Gardner transferred to the newly built and larger whaler Maria and thus was not her master on Globe's fourth voyage.

== 4th whaling voyage (1822–1824): the Globe Mutiny ==
On 22 December 1822, Globe, with a complement of 21 men under the command of Captain Thomas Worth, set sail on a whaling expedition to the Pacific. After finding success in the "off Japan" whaling grounds Globe arrived in Honolulu for provisioning. According to testimony, "Six men ran away in the Sandwich Islands, and one was discharged."

Captain Worth took on seven new crew, four of whom (Silas Payne, John Oliver, William Humphries and Joseph Thomas) played major roles in the mutiny. Samuel B. Comstock, a 22-year-old boatsteerer (harpooner), was the instigator of the mutiny, which occurred on 26 January 1824, near Fanning Island, 900 miles (1,400 km) south of the Hawaiian Islands.

The mutineers killed Captain Worth and three other officers, plus Eliza William of Edgartown, Massachusetts. Soon after, William Humphries, one of the mutineers, was accused of plotting to take the ship; a kangaroo court of the mutineers tried him and, finding him guilty, hanged him.

On 14 February the mutineers brought Globe to Mili Atoll. Comstock, the leader of the mutiny, had ambitions of creating his own kingdom on Mili Atoll. The other mutineers suspected that Comstock intended to destroy Globe and kill the rest of crew.

Payne and Oliver and two others shot Comstock. In an atmosphere of distrust existing between the mutineers, Payne and Oliver made an error in judgment by sending Gilbert Smith, a boatsteerer, to secure Globe. Smith and five other crew cut the anchor cable and set sail, eventually arriving at Valparaíso, Chile, where they were brought into custody by the American consul, Michael Hogan. Globe, under Captain King, was fitted out and returned to Nantucket, with Gilbert Smith as master.

Globe arrived back in port on 14 November 1824 with 372 barrels of sperm oil.

Payne and Oliver attempted to intimidate the islanders, but the islanders massacred most of the remaining mutineers. Out of nine castaways on Mili Atoll, only Cyrus M. Hussey and William Lay survived. The schooner USS Dolphin, commanded by Lieutenant Commander John Percival, rescued them on 25 November 1825.

== Later career and fate ==
Globe's fifth whaling voyage took place between 1825 and 1828, and yielded 2105 barrels of oil. She was then sold, transferred to Buenos Ayres, and broken up c. 1830.

== See also ==
- Mili Atoll—Description of The Globe Mutiny
- Nantucket shipbuilding
