= USS Timmerman =

Gearing-class destroyer

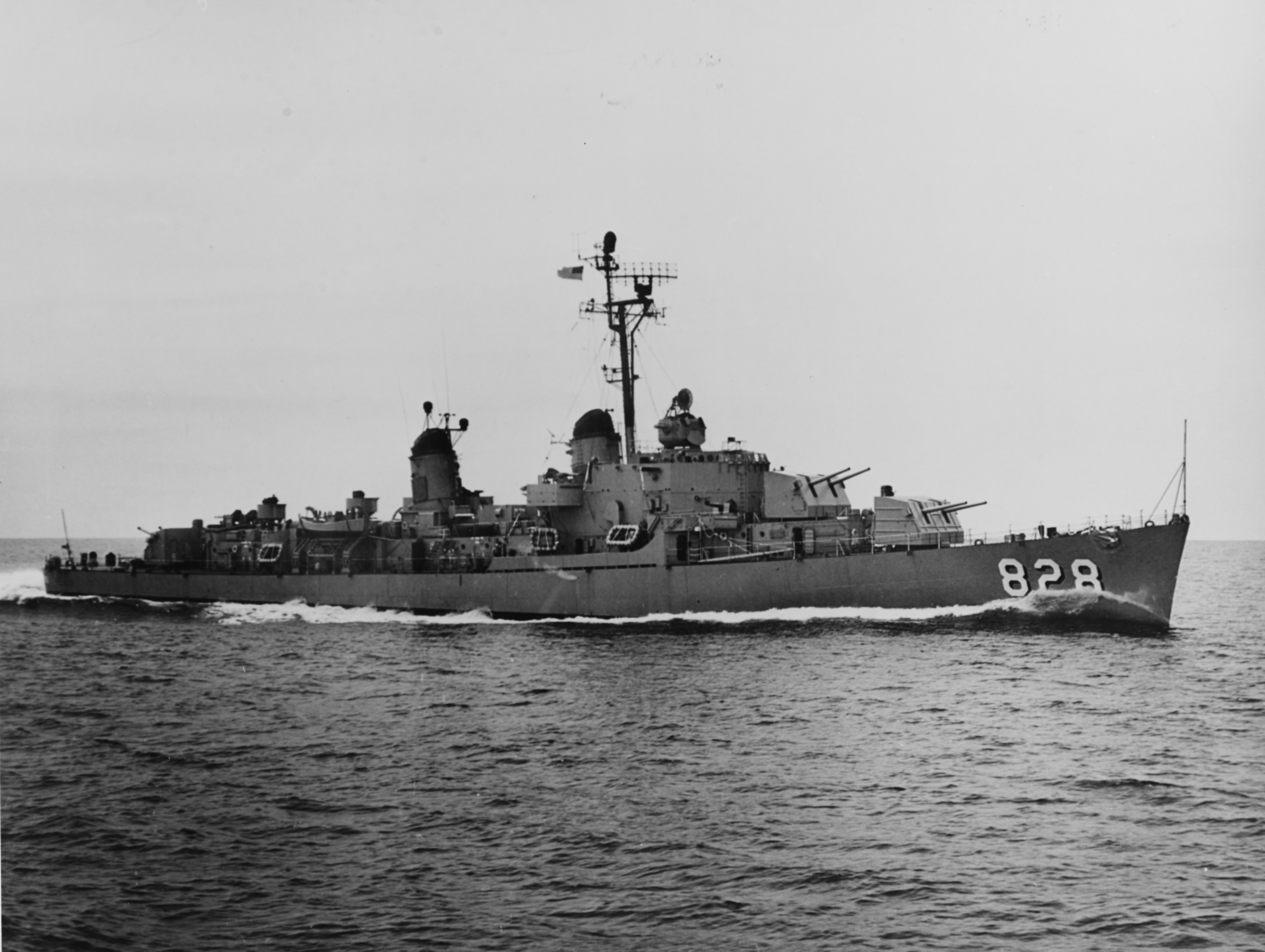
- USS Timmerman underway in 1953

History

United States
- Name: USS Timmerman
- Namesake: United States Marine Grant F. Timmerman
- Builder: Bath Iron Works, Bath, Maine
- Laid down: 1 October 1945
- Launched: 19 May 1951
- Sponsored by: Mrs. Fred Timmerman
- Commissioned: 26 September 1952
- Decommissioned: 27 July 1956
- Reclassified: EDD-828, 4 March 1950; AG-152, 11 January 1954
- Stricken: 4 April 1958
- Identification: Callsign: NAYY; Hull number: DD-828
- Fate: Sold in 1959 and scrapped

General characteristics
- Class & type: Gearing-class destroyer
- Displacement: 3,460 tons
- Length: 390 ft 6 in (119.02 m)
- Beam: 40 ft 10 in (12.45 m)
- Draft: 14 ft 4 in (4.37 m) (Max)
- Propulsion: 100,000 shp (75 MW) (in theory); 1 (port) General Electric Turbine 2,000psi/1,050 °F, 1 (starboard) Westinghouse turbine 875psi/1,050 °F (both intended for the cancelled DD-452), 2 screws
- Speed: Est. 40–43 knots (74–80 km/h; 46–49 mph)
- Range: 4,500 nautical miles (8,300 km; 5,200 mi) at 20 knots (37 km/h; 23 mph)
- Complement: 336 officer and enlisted
- Armament: 6 × 5 in (130 mm)/38 AA guns (3x2); 12 × 40 mm guns AA; 11 × 20 mm guns AA

USS Timmerman (DD-828/EDD-828/AG-152) was a Gearing-class destroyer in service with the United States Navy from 1952 to 1956. She was an experimental design and was scrapped in 1959.

== Design ==
Timmerman was originally planned as a Gearing-class destroyer in the United States Navy. Work was temporarily suspended on 7 January 1946 at 45.5% completion. She was later completed as an experimental destroyer, EDD-828. Designed to occupy the same space in standard Gearing engine spaces, Timmerman's machinery was designed to generate 100,000 shp (75,000 kW) versus the Gearing's 60,000 shp (45,000 kW). She had an aluminum superstructure. The machinery was originally intended for USS Percival (DD-452), a Fletcher-class destroyer, which was cancelled on 7 January 1946 before laying down.

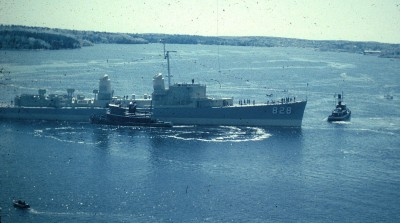
Launch of Timmerman on 19 May 1951.

Named for Grant F. Timmerman, she was laid down on 1 October 1945 at Bath, Maine, by the Bath Iron Works; assigned to the Atlantic Reserve Fleet on 19 November 1945; launched on 19 May 1951; sponsored by Mrs. Fred Timmerman; and commissioned on 26 September 1952.

== Operational service ==
Timmerman was constructed as an experimental, light weight, advanced design destroyer to test and evaluate, under operating conditions, advanced design experimental engineering equipment. As a unit of the Operational Development Force, 1st Naval District, Boston, Massachusetts, she tested her new propulsion system for the next four years. On 11 January 1954, her designation was changed to AG-152, a miscellaneous auxiliary ship.

The ship was decommissioned at Boston on 27 July 1956. She was moved to Philadelphia, Pennsylvania, in September and assigned to the Reserve Fleet. In early 1958, Timmerman was declared unfit for further service and stricken from the Navy list on 4 April 1958. On 21 April 1959, she was sold to the Boston Metals Co., Baltimore, Maryland, and scrapped.
