= USS Dolphin (1821) =

US Navy schooner

History

United States
- Name: USS Dolphin
- Builder: Philadelphia Navy Yard
- Launched: 23 June 1821
- Fate: Sold, 2 December 1835

General characteristics
- Type: Schooner
- Displacement: 198 long tons (201 t)
- Length: 88 ft (27 m)
- Beam: 23 ft 6 in (7.16 m)
- Draft: 12 ft 4 in (3.76 m)
- Speed: 17 knots (31 km/h; 20 mph)
- Armament: 12 × 6-pounder guns

USS Dolphin, a schooner, was the second ship of the United States Navy named for the aquatic mammal.

Dolphin was launched on 23 June 1821 by the Philadelphia Navy Yard and sent to New York City to be readied for sea. Assigned to duty as one of two vessels making up the newly organized Pacific Squadron, she sailed 8 December 1821 under the command of Lieutenant David Conner, in company with ship-of-the line Franklin.

Dolphin arrived at Valparaíso, Chile, on 6 February 1822, and cruised on the coasts of Ecuador, Peru, and Chile to protect American commerce and the whaling industry. Between 18 August 1825 and 24 August 1826, under the commanded by Lieut. Com. John Percival, she cruised to search for the mutineers of the American whaler Globe, returning to Callao, with the two surviving members of the mutiny. During this cruise, she visited Hawaii where she assisted men of the American ship London wrecked there, and helped other American citizens in the islands.

== 1826 Honolulu disturbance ==
While Dolphin was at Honolulu in 1826, tensions developed over a kapu imposed by the Hawaiian aliʻi restricting women from visiting foreign ships for prostitution. American sailors and merchants blamed the restrictions on Protestant missionaries of the American Board of Commissioners for Foreign Missions, particularly Hiram Bingham. Historian Noelani Arista has argued, however, that the restrictions represented an exercise of Hawaiian chiefly authority rather than laws imposed by the missionaries, who were assumed by many foreign sailors to be responsible for them.

Dolphin's commander, Lieutenant John Percival, opposed the restriction and pressed Kaʻahumanu and other Hawaiian leaders to have it removed. On February 26, sailors from Dolphin, joined by sailors from other vessels in port, formed a mob while on shore leave. They damaged the house of Kalanimoku, where Hawaiian leaders were attending worship, and then moved toward Bingham's residence. The violence was not a formal United States naval operation; contemporary accounts describe the participants as sailors on liberty, and Percival subsequently intervened with his officers and Hawaiians to suppress the riot and detain members of his crew.

The incident intensified an existing dispute between foreign sailors, American merchants, Protestant missionaries, and the government of the Hawaiian Kingdom. The U.S. Navy's historical account describes the restrictions on alcohol and women boarding ships as having been inspired by missionary influence and states that Percival and members of his crew used threats of force in seeking their repeal. Percival's conduct in Hawaii later became the subject of a naval court of inquiry, which cleared him of serious charges. His coercive actions were subsequently renounced by the United States, which later in 1826 sent Thomas ap Catesby Jones to the islands with instructions to conduct formal negotiations with the Hawaiian government.

== Fate ==
Dolphin served in the Pacific until 2 December 1835 when the Navy sold her.
