= John Percival =

United States Navy officer (1779-1862)

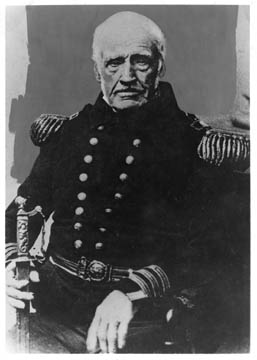
- Captain John "Mad Jack" Percival
- Born: 3 April 1779; West Barnstable, Massachusetts
- Died: 7 September 1862 (aged 83); Dorchester, Massachusetts
- Burial place: West Barnstable, Massachusetts
- Military career
- Allegiance: United States
- Branch: Navy
- Service years: 1799-1801 1809–1862
- Rank: Captain
- Nickname: Mad Jack

John Percival (3 April 1779 – 7 September 1862), known as Mad Jack Percival, was a United States Navy officer who served the Quasi-War with France, the War of 1812, the campaign against West Indies pirates, and the Mexican–American War.

== Biography ==
=== Early life ===
Born in West Barnstable, Massachusetts, Percival left his Cape Cod home at thirteen to work as a cabin boy on a Boston coaster. He moved to the merchant service, became a second mate, and while at Lisbon, he was impressed by the Royal Navy. First sent to HMS Victory under Lord Jervis, he soon received an assignment to a prize crew on a captured Spanish merchantman. Benefiting from lax discipline, Percival led an uprising and escaped to the American merchant ship Washington. Again impressment interrupted his homeward journey—this time by the Dutch Navy. Managing to escape a second time, once home, he decided to enter the U.S. Navy in 1799. Subsequently, he served in the Quasi-War with France as a master's mate and midshipman. He was discharged in the demobilization of 1801 and went back to the merchant service.

Percival married Maria Pinkerton of Trenton, New Jersey in 1809. The couple did not have children although they informally adopted a relative, Maria Weeks.

=== War of 1812 ===
In 1809, he returned to the U.S. Navy as a sailing master, assigned to USS Syren at the Norfolk Navy Yard. After a leave, he moved to the New York yard under Commodore Jacob Lewis. Placed in command of Gunboat No. 6, he engaged in several skirmishes with British forces plaguing American shipping. As a stratagem, Percival borrowed the fishing smack Yankee on the Fourth of July in 1813, using it to capture the unsuspecting HMS Eagle, the tender of the 74-gun HMS Poictiers. Percival joined USS Peacock on 9 March 1814 and made three cruises during which the ship sloop captured nineteen merchantmen and two warships, HMS Epervier and the East India Company armed brig HCS Nautilus, 12 percent of the total taken by the U.S. Navy during the war. For his gallantry in the capture of HMS Epervier, he was promoted to lieutenant and presented with a special sword by Congress, shown in the accompanying portrait from about 1860.

=== Mid-career ===
After the war, the Navy assigned Percival to the Boston Navy Yard. Within weeks, he reported for duty on USS Macedonian. The captain's clerk, Charles J. Deblois, noted "Lt. P. carries a taught hand, ... He goes by the name of Mad Jack." This is the earliest record of Percival's colorful nickname. Apparently tracing to his intense command style, the application of monikers to military and naval officers was common to the time. After a cruise to South America, he returned to serve as executive officer at the Boston yard. In late 1823, he transferred to the frigate USS United States on the Pacific station under Commodore Isaac Hull. The two New Englanders were close associates and friends throughout their careers. Hull considered Percival "the best sailor I ever saw!"

In 1826, Hull put him in command of USS Dolphin and directed him to the far reaches of the uncharted Pacific to track down the mutineers of the Nantucket whaleship Globe. In the Mulgrave Islands, he recovered two innocent crewmen, the only survivors of the ill-fated whaler. The culprits behind the mutiny had killed one another or were dispatched by natives. Mad Jack returned by way of the Sandwich Islands (Hawaii), the first American naval ship to visit the place. His stay proved controversial and provided fodder for writers over the years. American missionaries clashed with the naval officer who challenged their sway over the local civil authorities. Under growing pressure from visiting merchant and whaling crews, the authorities rescinded a missionary-advocated ban on young women swimming out to the visiting vessels. The missionaries blamed their loss of influence on Percival. Their forceful complaints to Washington compelled Percival to eventually ask for a court of inquiry to clear his name. The court absolved him of wrongdoing, while to this day, United States destroyer squadrons based at Pearl Harbor celebrate Mad Jack Percival Day each May 11, the date Dolphin left the islands in 1826.

Percival next commanded the U.S. schooner Porpoise on an 1830–1831 cruise against the troublesome West Indian pirates. While on leave in 1832, the department notified him of his promotion to Master Commandant effective in March 1831. After, in 1834–1835, he had the U.S. sloop-of-war Erie on the Brazil station. In 1836, once again, he took over as executive officer in Boston. While assigned this duty, Percival displayed his concern for the welfare of the common sailor. A group of seamen transferring from the Brooklyn yard to Boston were injured, four of them seriously, when their train derailed along the way. The four received a total settlement of $12,862. Percival volunteered to administer a trust set up in behalf of the men. He did so over several years with prudence and faithfulness, paying out every cent to the beneficiaries or their survivors. The extensive and detailed record of Percival's careful and honest handling of the matter can be found in his papers at the Massachusetts Historical Society. (This relatively insignificant episode warrants this brief mention, because a careless writer, relying on insufficient research, wrongly charged that Percival absconded with the funds. From time to time, the misrepresentation is repeated.)

In 1838, he received command of the second-class ship sloop USS Cyane and headed to the Mediterranean to again serve under Hull. A principal ancillary duty involved educating and training young midshipman. Percival undertook the task with zeal and passion. Prominent men and fellow officers with midshipmen sons commonly asked for their youngster to be placed under the stern tutelage of Mad Jack. The young men did not always appreciate it at the time, but many went on to notable careers. As one example, Gustavus V. Fox chafed under Percival's disciplined approach on the cruise, but went on to become Lincoln's assistant secretary of the navy. Others distinguished themselves in combat. John L. Worden, a Cyane midshipman, became an admiral and is remembered as a hero of the Battle of Hampton Roads. One of the most irksome midshipmen on the cruise, nonetheless, recognized and appreciated their skipper. Henry A. Wise summarized the almost universal feeling in the service when he noted: "There is not a better sailor in the world than Cap. Percival or a man of better judgement in the qualities requisite for a Seaman. ... One would suppose from his impatient & passionate temper, that in case of danger he would lose all command of himself. On the contrary no one is cooler or more able to fulfill the duties of his station. To give the devil his due—I would rather trust my life to his charge in case of emergency at Sea than any other man in the United States Navy."

Percival left Cyane late in 1839 due to poor health. While waiting for an assignment, he received promotion to captain in September 1841, the highest U.S. Navy rank at the time.

=== Circumnavigation voyage ===
He began the most memorable chapter of his life in November 1843. The frigate USS Constitution presented a major concern to the department. In disrepair, the venerable old ship served as a mere receiving (barracks) ship at Norfolk. Naval Constructor Foster Rhodes figured it would cost $70,000 to fit her out for sea. But the department did not have the money. Acting Secretary David Henshaw, from Massachusetts, knew about Mad Jack's reputation for seamanship and frugality. He told Percival to take a look. Percival reported he could do the work for $10,000. Despite widespread doubts about Percival's findings, Henshaw gave him the task.

By mid-January 1844 Percival informed the secretary he "unhesitatingly" determined the ship ready for "a two or even a three year cruise." And he was prepared to stake "his life and reputation" on his assessment. Accordingly, Henshaw told the captain to get his ship ready for sea. Percival found it necessary to sail to New York to complete his 447-man crew. Percival's orders directed him to carry the first U.S. ambassador to Brazil, proceed to the east coast of Africa and on to the China seas, making his best way back to the United States. He left New York at the end of May 1844. Before the voyage ended in Boston 495 days later, the ship sailed 52,370.5 miles, circumnavigating the globe for the only time in her illustrious career.

A number of members of the crew kept detailed journals of the cruise, and one officer even sketched entertaining watercolors of scenes and incidents along the way. Added to official correspondence, the result is a well-documented trip. One episode stands out above all others. In early May 1845, the ship anchored in Touron Bay, Cochin China (now Vietnam). On the second day, Percival received a note from a French missionary, Bishop Dominique Lefevere, saying the local authorities had him under arrest and condemned him to death. Within an hour, Mad Jack led 80 well-armed men ashore. Percival left a letter for the king of Cochin China demanding the bishop's release. To make his point, he returned to the ship with three mandarins held as hostages. The next day, Percival pressed the issue by capturing three junks belonging to the king, and moved his warship closer to the local forts. On the following day, the prize junks attempted to escape, but were recovered after a brief skirmish. Percival, as well as the Cochin Chinese themselves, denied the gunplay resulted in any casualties. Nonetheless, a rumor of fatalities continued into the 20th century when the confrontation became known as the first armed intervention by a Western nation against present-day Vietnam. In any event, a short while later Lefevere gained his freedom and the French credited the American effort for saving his life. King Louis Philippe intended to reward officers and crew. But political turmoil interfered. Since the king "took a hurried journey from his capital, ... no recognition of their services was ever received by the American tars." Their compensation went "over the walls of the Tuileries gardens" as Louis Philippe escaped to London.

=== Later life ===
After Constitution returned from her voyage in October 1845, Captain Percival went on leave and was placed on "waiting orders" status. In 1855, when Percival was 76 years old, the Navy Department placed him on the newly created "Reserve List", a forerunner of the Retired List. Although Percival was alive during the first year of the American Civil War, he took no part in it.

In his last years, Percival gave silver cups to a few people close to him. One, given to the son of his attorney, offered a brief summary of his career. As well as anything, the inscription explains the man. Percival wrote: "This Cup, with the Donor, has made three cruises to the Pacific, one to the Mediterranean, one to the Brazils, two to the West Indies, and once around the world, a distance of about 150,000 miles. Has been 37 years in service and has never refused duty." Some years ago, a private collector found the cup in a London flea market, and it was sold for $10,000 in a 2016 Cape Cod auction.

Often described as colorful, Mad Jack attracted the attention of famed authors such as Hawthorne, Melville, and Michener. Melville, in fact, patterned his fictional character Lieutenant Mad Jack after his acquaintance, Percival. In the end, Percival's legendary status is enhanced by the fact his first naval ship, HMS Victory and his last, USS Constitution, the oldest commissioned warship and the oldest commissioned warship afloat, remain national shrines for their respective nations.

== Death ==
Captain Percival died at the age of 83 on 7 September 1862 in Dorchester, Massachusetts and is buried near his birthplace in West Barnstable's Ancient Cemetery.

== Promotions ==
- Cabin Boy – c. 1793
- 2nd Mate in Merchant Service – c. 1797
- Impressed into Royal Navy – 24 February 1797
- Escapes from Royal Navy – April 1797
- Masters Mate, USN – July 1799
- Midshipman, USN – 13 May 1800
- Discharged from USN (returns to merchant service) – July 1801
- Sailing Master, USN – 6 March 1809
- Lieutenant, USN – 9 December 1814
- Master Commandant, USN – 3 March 1831
- Captain, USN – 8 September 1841
- Reserved List – 13 September 1855
- Died – 17 September 1862

Source – Mad Jack Percival. James H. Ellis. Naval Institute Press. 2002.

== Namesakes ==
Two US Navy ships have been named USS Percival.

Percival Drive in West Barnstable, MA is in the neighborhood of his birthplace, the homestead long since torn down.

Percival Street on Meeting House Hill in Dorchester is named for him.
