= USS Patrol =

USS Patrol, usually but not always followed by a numerical designation, has been the name of more than one United States Navy ship, and may refer to:

- USS Patrol (1917), a former United States Coast Guard cutter in commission as a patrol vessel from 1918 to 1919
- USS Patrol No. 1 (SP-45), often rendered as USS Patrol #1, a patrol vessel in commission from 1917 to 1919
- USS Patrol No. 2 (SP-409), often rendered as USS Patrol #2, a patrol vessel in commission from 1917 to 1919
- USS Patrol No. 4 (SP-8), often rendered as USS Patrol #4, a patrol vessel in commission from 1917 to 1919
- USS Patrol No. 5 (SP-29), often rendered as USS Patrol #5, a patrol vessel in commission from 1917 to 1919
- USS Patrol No. 6 (SP-54), often rendered as USS Patrol #6, a patrol vessel in commission from 1917 to 1919
- USS Patrol No. 7 (SP-31), often rendered as USS Patrol #7, a patrol vessel in commission from 1917 to 1919
- USS Patrol No. 8 (SP-56), often rendered as USS Patrol #8, a patrol vessel in commission from 1917 to 1919
- USS Patrol No. 10 (SP-85), often rendered as USS Patrol #10, a patrol vessel in commission from 1917 to 1919
- USS Patrol No. 11 (SP-1106), often rendered as USS Patrol #11, a patrol vessel in commission from 1917 to 1918

A private motorboat named Patrol No. 3 in existence at the time of the U.S. participation in World War I (1917–1918) was never taken over by the U.S. Navy.
