= Patrol (disambiguation) =

A patrol is the reconnaissance of or providing security for a designated area or route.

Patrol, Patroller or Patrolling may also refer to:

== Television, arts and entertainment ==
- Patrol (novel), a 1927 novel by Philip MacDonald
- Patrol (TV series), a 1989 Singaporean drama series
- The Patrol, a 2013 British film
- TV Patrol, Filipino flagship newscast of ABS-CBN
- Patrol, a board wargame later incorporated into Sniper!

== Places ==
- Patrol, a village in Cianjur Regency, West Java, Indonesia
- Patrol, a district in Indramayu Regency, West Java, Indonesia
- Patrol Baru, a village in Sukra district, Indramayu Regency, West Java, Indonesia

== Police and military ==
- Patrol officer, a police officer responsible for a particular 'beat' or area
- Patrol Special police, a neighborhood police force in San Francisco, California
- Patrolling, a military tactic

== Transportation ==
=== Motor vehicles ===
- Nissan Patrol, a four-wheel-drive vehicle
- Roadside assistance or "roadside patrol", vehicle–breakdown assistance services, including those provided by:
  - American Automobile Association, US
  - The Automobile Association, UK
  - RAC Limited, UK
- Patrol, a type of wildland fire engine

=== Ships ===
- HMS Patrol, a British Royal Navy scout cruiser 1905–1919
- HMS Patroller (D07), a World War II aircraft carrier
- USCGC Patrol, two US Coast Guard or Revenue Cutter Service vessels
- USS Patrol, several US Navy ships

== Other uses ==
- Junior safety patrol, volunteer student crossing guards for American schools
- Scout patrol, a subdivision of a Scout Troop
- Patrol Software, a company acquired by BMC Software
- Safran Patroller, a French unmanned aerial vehicle
- Patrola, a Yugoslav new wave band
