= Crime Patrol =

Crime Patrol may refer to:

- Crime Patrol (TV series), an Indian TV series first broadcast in 2003
- Crime Patrol (video game), a 1993 laserdisc game
- Crime Patrol 2: Drug Wars, a 1994 sequel
- The Crime Patrol, a 1936 American film directed by Eugene Cummings
- Crime Patrol, a 1948–1950 EC comic, later continued as The Crypt of Terror and Tales from the Crypt (comics)
- Neighborhood watch, or citizen crime patrol

== See also ==
- Police
- Safety patrol
- Patrol (disambiguation)
