= Sam Browne belt =

Military and police clothing item of British origin

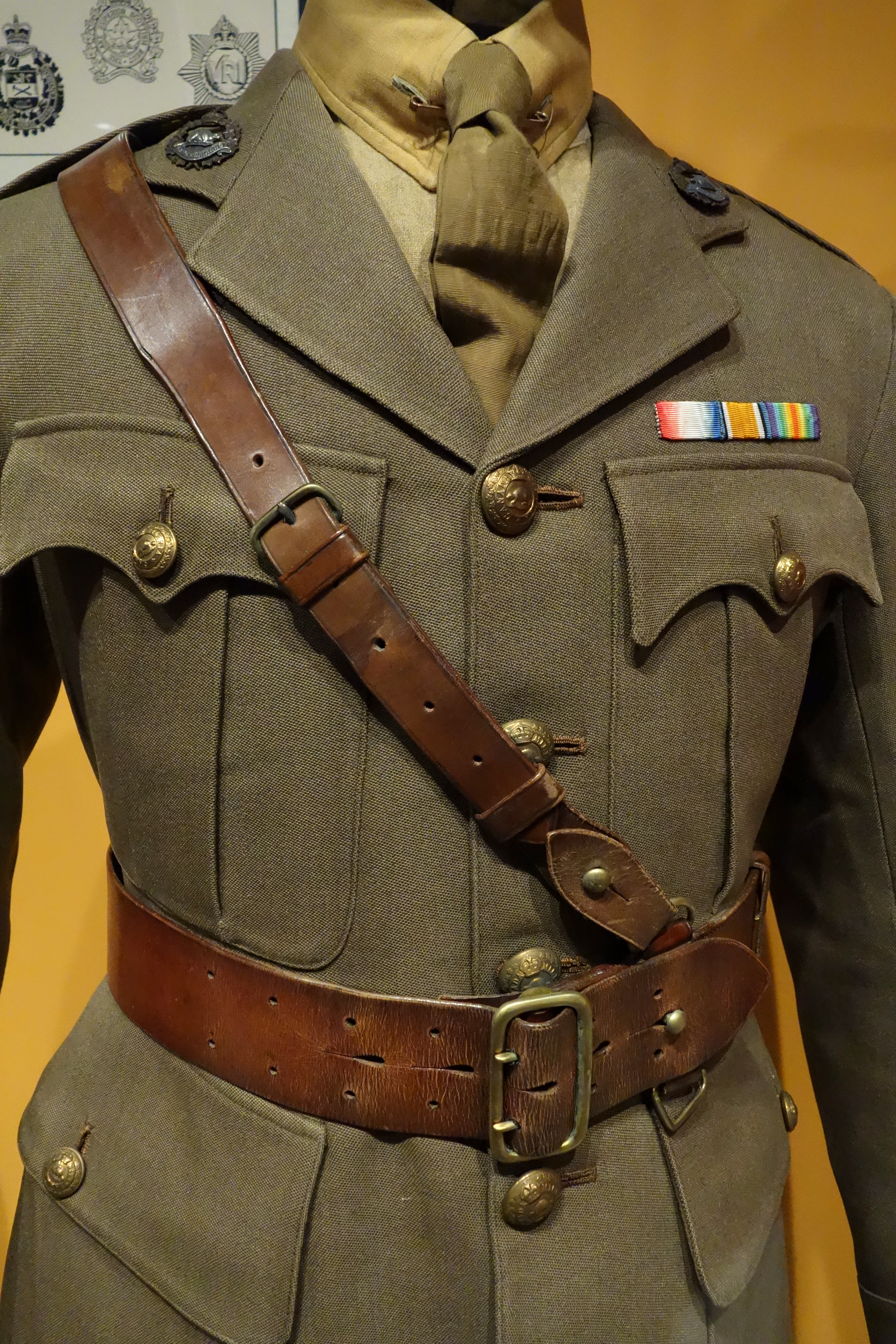
A Sam Browne belt as worn by Canadian Expeditionary Force officers in World War I

The Sam Browne belt is a leather belt with a supporting strap that passes over the right shoulder, worn by military and police officers. It is named after Samuel J. Browne (1824–1901), the British Indian Army general who invented it.

== Origins ==
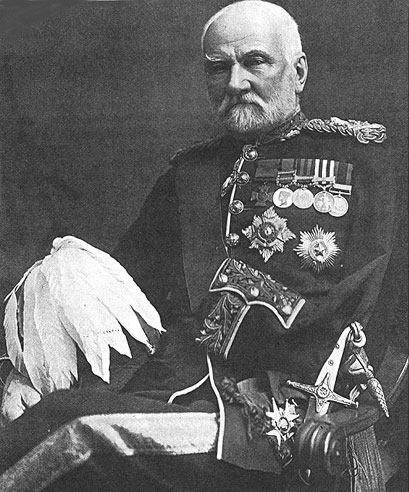
General Sir Sam Browne, missing his left arm and beltless, in uniform

General Sir Samuel James Browne was a 19th-century British Indian Army officer who lost his left arm to a sword cut during the Sepoy Rebellion. He wore his sword in a scabbard on his left side, but the lack of a left hand to steady it made drawing the weapon difficult.

Browne devised a supplementary belt that hooked into a waist belt with D-rings and ran diagonally over his right shoulder to steady the scabbard. The waist belt also securely carried a pistol in a flap-holster on his right hip and included a binocular case with a neck-strap. Other officers began wearing a similar rig and eventually it became part of the standard uniform. During the Boer War, it was copied by other troops and eventually became standard issue.

Infantry officers wore a variant that used two suspender-like straps instead of the cross-belt. It was supposedly invented in 1878 by Lieutenant Basil Templer Graham-Montgomery, of the 60th King's Royal Rifle Corps, while serving in India.

== Use ==
=== Military ===
Due to its former use as equipment for carrying a sword, it was traditionally only worn by those to whom a sword would historically have been issued, namely commissioned officers and warrant officers.

==== Finland ====
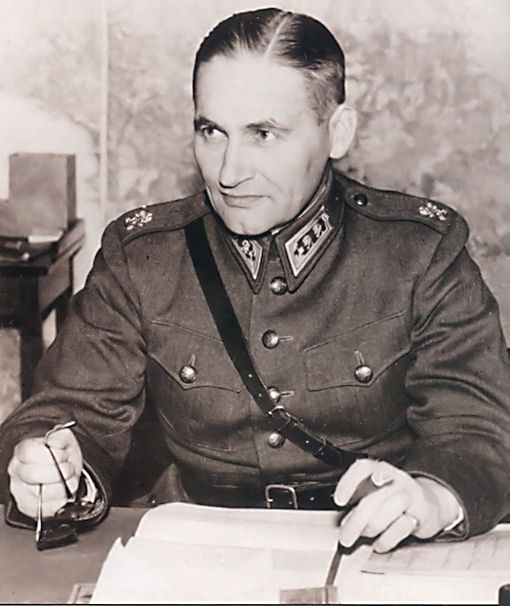
Finnish Lieutenant-General Hugo Österman during the Second World War

In the Finnish Army (as well as in Finnish Air Force) the Sam Browne belt, officially known as a "command belt" or "officer belt" and commonly nicknamed "rähinäremmi", literally "brawling belt", has been used by officers and senior NCOs as well as officer cadets when wearing service, dress or parade uniforms. Currently it is mainly used by high-ranking officers during parades and other ceremonies, as it is only worn with dress uniform M58 and service uniform M83; while most Army and Air Force personnel, excluding cadets studying in the National Defence College as well as soldiers on ceremonial duties, use the camouflage uniform M05 as their service uniform, and the use of the "command belt" with any camouflage uniform except M62 (already phased out of service) is strictly forbidden.

==== Germany ====
The Sam Browne belt featured prominently in many uniforms used by the Nazi Party in Nazi Germany, again in imitation of earlier European uniforms. It was popular with Adolf Hitler and other leading Nazi officials.

==== Greece ====
The Sam Browne belt was used concurrently with British-style uniforms from 1937 till 1970 by the Hellenic Army and the Hellenic Gendarmerie.

==== Ireland ====
The Irish Citizen Army, Irish Volunteers and Irish Republican Army (IRA) made extensive use of Sam Browne belts during the Irish revolutionary period (1916–23). This included women serving with the Irish Citizen Army, among them Constance Markievicz. The folk song "The Broad Black Brimmer" also mentions the Sam Browne belt. They were later used by the Garda Síochána and the National Army.

==== Sweden ====
The Swedish Armed Forces used Sam Browne belts as part of their uniform for officers and NCOs from 1923 until 1958.

==== Commonwealth of Nations ====
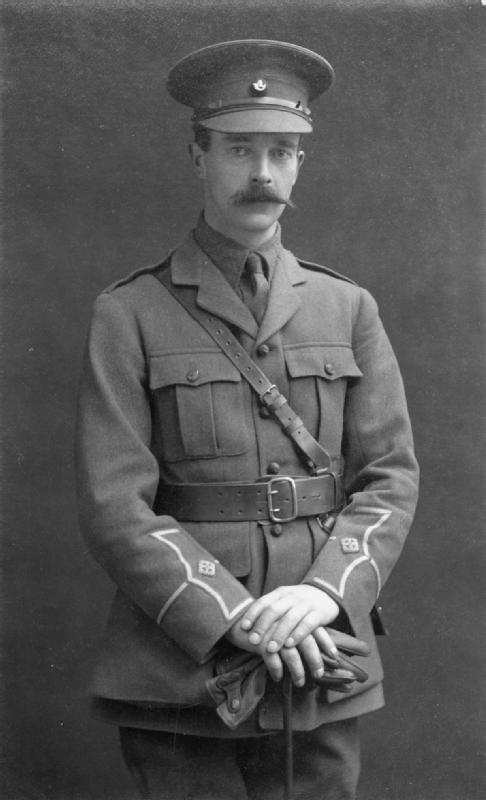
Second Lieutenant H Naish of the King's Royal Rifle Corps during the First World War

In the 20th century it was a mainstay in the British Army officer corps, being adopted service-wide in 1900 during the Second Boer War after limited use in India and later becoming popular with military forces throughout the Commonwealth.

After World War II the Sam Browne belt saw a decline in use in the Commonwealth. It was dropped from the standard officer's field kit in 1943 and replaced by the cloth 1937 pattern and 1944 pattern webbing gear. However officers and warrant officers class I of the British Army and Royal Marines still wear it in service (No. 2) dress and in non-ceremonial versions of No. 1 dress.

It was phased out by the Canadian military beginning with the unification of the armed services in 1968.

In Australia all officers and warrant officers class I are entitled to wear the belt in ceremonial dress. Within the corps of the Australian Army there is some variation, with members of the Royal Australian Armoured Corps, Royal Australian Army Nursing Corps and Australian Army Aviation Corps wearing black Sam Browne belts.

In the Indian Army the Sam Browne belt was worn by officers and Junior Commissioned Officers until the early 1980s, after which its use was phased out. However it is still part of the uniform of officers in the Indian police forces.

==== United States ====
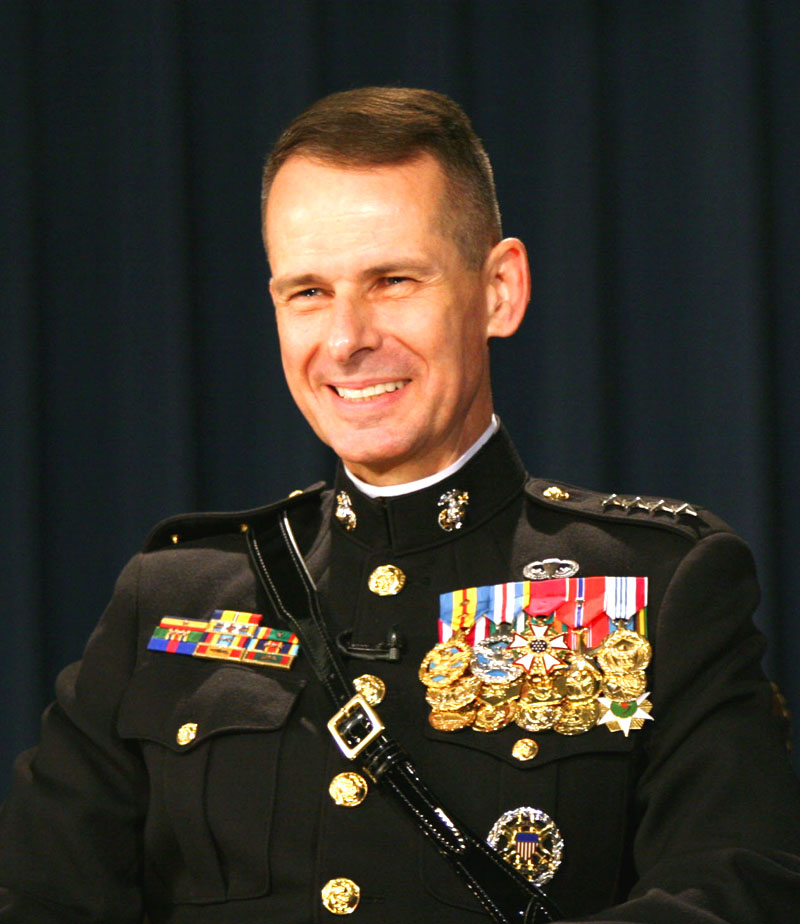
U.S. Marine Corps General Peter Pace in 2005

During World War I, the Sam Browne Belt was approved by General Pershing, commander of the AEF, for wear by American officers as a rank distinction. However, the Army as a whole did not immediately approve its use. MPs were positioned at stateside docks and confiscated them from returning officers. The United States Army mandated the Sam Browne belt for overseas soldiers in 1918 under the name "Liberty belt" and for all service members in 1921, this time under the internationally accepted name "Sam Browne belt". It was a standard part of the uniform between World War I and World War II. It was limited in use in 1940 when the Army abandoned sabers and replaced with a cloth waistbelt that was sewn to the officer's jacket.

During World War I the Marine Corps adopted a brown leather Sam Browne Belt. It was later changed to black, the official color of Navy and Marine Corps leather gear. It is worn as part of the dress Blue A & B, Blue-white dress A & B, and service A uniforms for commissioned and warrant officers, with or without bearing a sword .

After the First World War, Sam Browne belts "become almost universal among American police". The belts led to the slang terms Harness Bull or Harness Cop for a uniformed police officer. The utility belts worn today by American police usually lack the cross-strap and the attachments for them. The belt fastens in the same way, with the bar of the buckle engaging a pair of hooks and the end of the belt retained by a post and keeper loop. They are also frequently fully lined, as opposed to the old-style half-linings, to support equipment the length of the belt.

=== Police ===
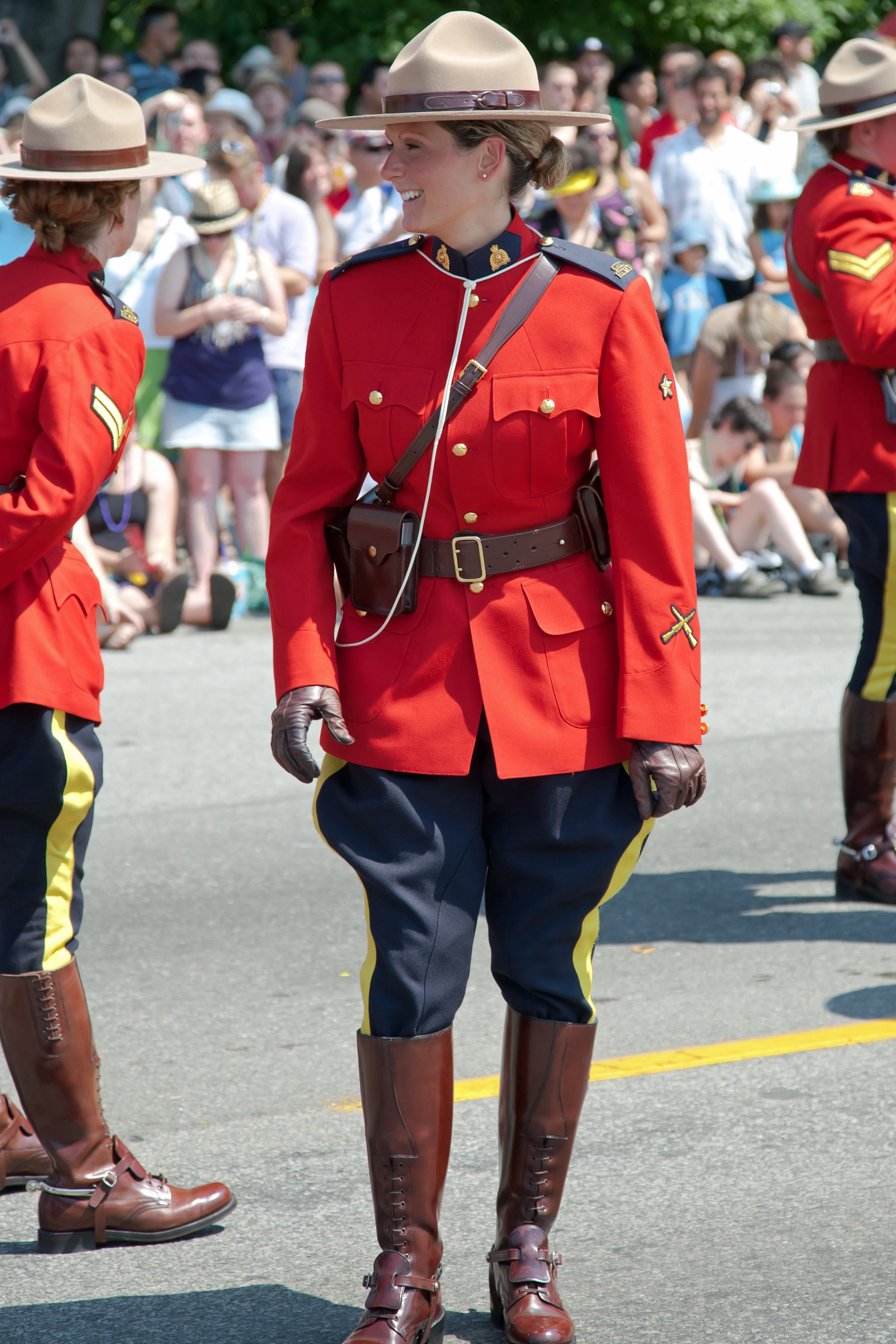
Royal Canadian Mounted Police constable, Vancouver 2009

The Sam Browne belt is largely obsolete (except in dress uniforms) in police and security use due to risk of strangulation by potential opponents. It has sometimes been referred to as a Suicide Belt by personnel. It had enjoyed some popularity with civilian police agencies worldwide and was probably most widely worn in this context during the 1940s and 1950s. This use has gradually faded out due to field safety concerns.

Despite these safety concerns New Jersey State Police Troopers always wear their sidearm on a full Sam Browne belt. The full Sam Browne belt was adopted for use by New Jersey State Police Col. Norman Schwarzkopf Sr., as the belt gave the wearer a proper "brace" (known by General of the Armies John Pershing as the "West Point Brace)".

It is part of the ceremonial dress uniform of many agencies, most notably the Red Serge worn by the Royal Canadian Mounted Police. RCMP NCOs and other ranks wear a thin cross-belt over the left shoulder to support the pistol worn on the right side. Non-commissioned members who are left-handed wear the same cross strap over the right shoulder to support the pistol worn on the left side. RCMP commissioned officers wear a wider cross strap over the right shoulder due to the need to support a sword when wearing the red serge ceremonial uniform. This difference of wearing different cross straps over different shoulders for commissioned and non-commissioned members is maintained when wearing the stripped Sam Browne belt (no pistol or sword).

=== Civilian ===
During the interwar period, the belt became fashionable among some American and European women. Eleanor Roosevelt, the first lady of the United States at the time, openly spoke out against the practice. In the United States, the belts also became a symbol of civilian authority by "everybody from bus drivers to volunteer schoolboy traffic cops". The belt's use by American junior safety patrol members is archetypal. High-visibility Sam Browne-style belts are a popular safety device among cyclists for increasing their visibility, and a bright orange version is often worn by school crossing guards in junior safety patrols. The Sam Browne belt has been proposed as a solution to occupational safety and health concerns about injury due to the weight of equipment on police officers' belts. However, others have expressed concern that the vertical design of the belt could enable others to gain physical control of law enforcement officers in an altercation.

== See also ==
- Baldric
- Bandolier
- Police duty belt
- Shoulder belt
