= USS Patrol No. 4 =

Patrol vessel of the United States Navy

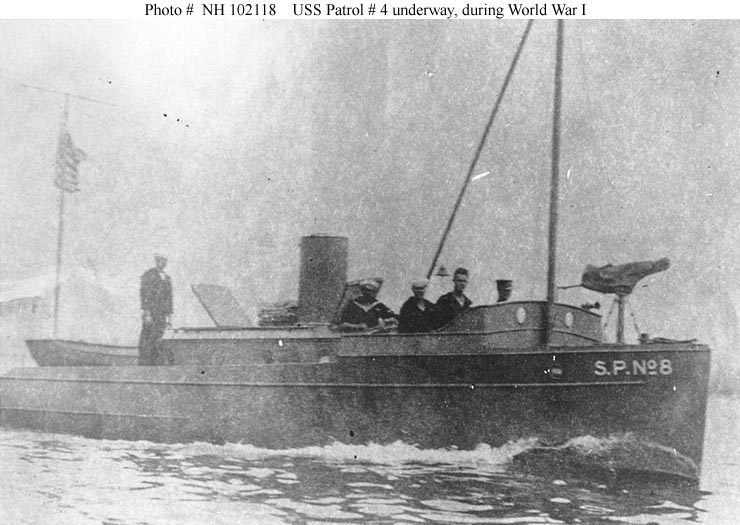
- USS Patrol No. 4 during World War I

History

United States
- Name: Patrol No. 4
- Namesake: Previous name retained
- Builder: Britt Brothers, Lynn, Massachusetts
- Completed: 1915
- Acquired: Formally leased on 21 April 1917 (post-commissioning)
- Commissioned: 18 April 1917
- Fate: Returned to owner 17 March 1919
- Notes: Operated as private motorboat Patrol No. 4 1915-1917

General characteristics
- Type: Patrol vessel
- Tonnage: 5 tons
- Length: 40 ft 0 in (12.19 m)
- Beam: 9 ft 0 in (2.74 m)
- Draft: 2 ft 9 in (0.84 m)
- Speed: 25 kn (46 km/h; 29 mph)
- Complement: 5
- Armament: 1 × machine gun

USS Patrol No. 4 (SP-8), often rendered as USS Patrol #4, was an armed motorboat that served in the United States Navy as a patrol vessel from 1917 to 1919.

== Background ==
Patrol No. 4 was built as a private motorboat of the same name in 1915 by Britt Brothers at Lynn, Massachusetts. She was one of five motorboats built to the same design for private owners by Britt Brothers as part of the civilian Preparedness Movement program with an understanding that they would enter U.S. Navy service in time of war, the others being Patrol No. 1, which later became USS Patrol No. 1 (SP-45); Patrol No. 2, which later became USS Patrol No. 2 (SP-409); Patrol No. 3, which never entered U.S. Navy service; and Patrol No. 5, which later became USS Patrol No. 5 (SP-29).

The U.S. Navy commissioned Patrol No. 4 for service during World War I as USS Patrol No. 4 (SP-8) on 18 April 1917, formally leasing her from her owner, Guy Norman of Newport News, Virginia, on 21 April 1917.

Patrol No. 4 operated in the 2nd Naval District, headquartered at Newport, Rhode Island, on coastal patrol throughout the period of the United States' participation in World War I. After post-war decommissioning, she was returned to her owner on 17 March 1919.
