= USS Patrol No. 1 =

Patrol vessel of the United States Navy

Coordinates: 24.578°N 81.708°W

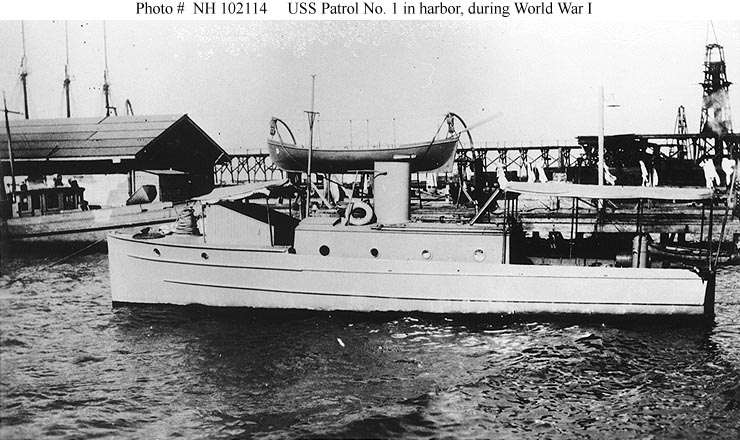
- USS Patrol No. 1 during World War I

History

United States
- Name: USS Patrol No. 1
- Namesake: Previous name retained
- Builder: Britt Brothers, Lynn, Massachusetts
- Completed: 1916
- Acquired: Formally purchased from owner on 25 May 1917 (post-commissioning)
- Commissioned: 4 May 1917
- Stricken: 13 June 1919, subsequently reinstated; 4 October 1919 (second and final time)
- Fate: Wrecked 9–10 September 1919
- Notes: Operated as private motorboat Patrol No. 1 1916-1917

General characteristics
- Type: Patrol vessel
- Displacement: 5 long tons (5 t)
- Length: 40 ft (12 m)
- Beam: 9 ft (2.7 m)
- Draft: 2 ft 3 in (0.69 m)
- Speed: 25 kn (29 mph; 46 km/h)
- Armament: 1 × .30 in (7.6 mm) machine gun

USS Patrol No. 1 (SP-45), often rendered as USS Patrol #1, was an armed motorboat that served in the United States Navy as a patrol vessel from 1917 to 1919.

== Background ==
Patrol No. 1 was built as a private motorboat of the same name in 1916 by Britt Brothers at Lynn, Massachusetts. She was one of five motorboats built to the same design for private owners by Britt Brothers as part of the civilian Preparedness Movement program with an understanding that they would enter U.S. Navy service in time of war, the others being Patrol No. 2, which later became Patrol No. 2 (SP-409); Patrol No. 3, which never entered U.S. Navy service; Patrol No. 4, which later became Patrol No. 4 (SP-8); and Patrol No. 5, which later became Patrol No. 5 (SP-29).

The U.S. Navy commissioned Patrol No. 1 for service during World War I as USS Patrol No. 1 (SP-45) on 4 May 1917, formally purchasing her from her owner, A. Loring Sweeney of Boston, Massachusetts on 25 May 1917. She operated in the 7th Naval District, headquartered at Key West, Florida, on patrol throughout the United States' participation in World War I.

Patrol No. 1 was decommissioned postwar and stricken from the Naval Vessel Register on 13 June 1919. She was anchored at North Beach Basin at Key West awaiting sale when she was battered to pieces by the 1919 Florida Keys hurricane on 9–10 September. Apparently having been reinstated on the Naval Vessel Register since June 1919, she was stricken from it for a second and final time on 4 October.
