= Marvin Klegman =

Marvin Alan Klegman
- Born: December 11, 1937
- Died: April 13, 1949 (aged 11); Tacoma, Washington, U.S.
- Occupation: Student

Marvin Alan Klegman (December 11, 1937 – April 13, 1949) was a member of the school safety patrol at Lowell Elementary School in Tacoma, Washington who was killed during the 1949 Olympia earthquake. He is locally celebrated for his actions during the disaster.

== Early life and education ==
Klegman was born in 1937 to Sam and Thelma Klegman. He was a Cub Scout and a newspaper delivery boy for the Tacoma News Tribune. In this latter capacity he had won a bicycle for selling the most newspaper subscriptions. By 1949, at the age of 11, he was a volunteer on the safety patrol at Lowell Elementary, where he was enrolled in the sixth grade.

== Olympia earthquake and death ==
On the day of his death, Klegman had been assigned to noon safety patrol duty. He was responsible for ensuring younger students walking home during lunch safely crossed the street. According to witnesses, Klegman left class for patrol at 11:50 a.m. on April 13, five minutes before the earthquake struck. As the temblor began, Klegman shouted to Myrna Phelps, a second grader who was standing in the school yard, "Stop where you are! Stay there!" Phelps, who was about to run inside the building, froze in position. Phelps has credited Klegman's order for her to remain in the relative safety of the school yard with saving her life. Klegman then rushed inside the building to find kindergarten student Kelcy Robert Allen alone in a hallway. Klegman grabbed Allen by the hand and led him outside as the building began to crumble. Unable to make it clear of the structure, Klegman shielded Allen with his body and was killed by falling bricks. Allen, though injured, made a full recovery.

Klegman was interred at Home of Peace cemetery in Lakewood, Washington on April 15, 1949. The Lowell Elementary School safety patrol provided a cordon of honor during the funeral.

== Legacy ==
- The Mount Rainier chapter of the American Red Cross sponsors the Marvin Klegman award, an annual recognition given to a resident of Pierce County, Washington who engages in an act of heroism.
- A statue, installed in 2003 on the grounds of the rebuilt Lowell Elementary School, shows Klegman leading Allen from the school building while looking skyward at the moment the school's chimney begins to collapse on him.
- April 13, the day of Klegman's death, is observed as Marvin Klegman Day in Tacoma. A commemorative assembly is annually held at Lowell Elementary School on this date.

== See also ==
- Tacoma Public Schools
- Washington Medal of Valor
