= Red Serge =

Uniform of the Royal Canadian Mounted Police

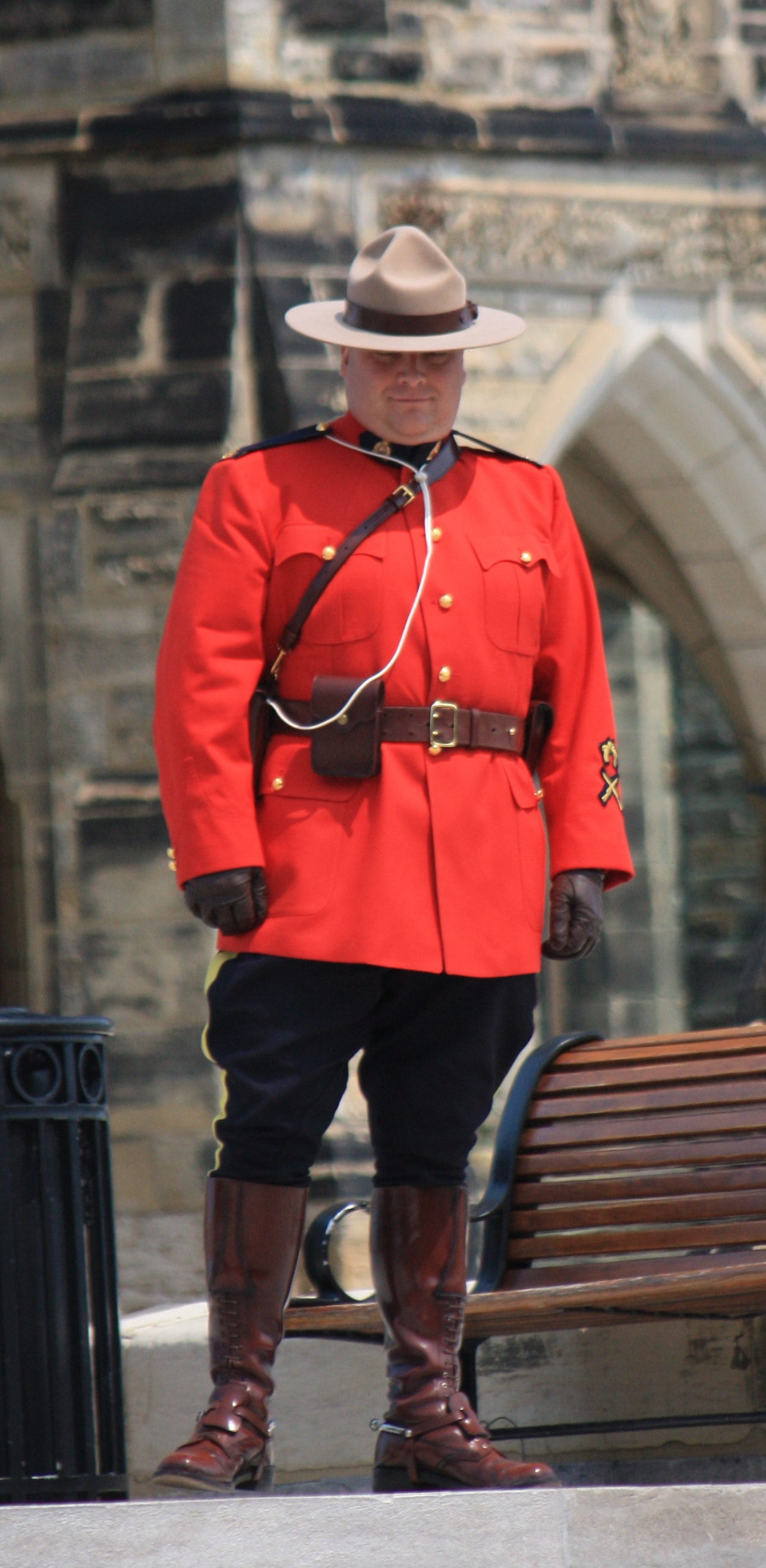
RCMP wearing the Red Serge while on duty at Parliament Hill, Ottawa

The Red Serge is the ceremonial dress uniform of the Royal Canadian Mounted Police. It consists of a military pattern scarlet tunic tailored from serge fabric, with the high collar, blue breeches with yellow stripe identifying a cavalry history, a Stetson hat, a Sam Browne belt, and high brown leather boots with a white rope.

== Constables and non-commissioned officers ==
Constables (Cst) and non-commissioned officers (NCOs) wear the red serge tunic with midnight blue gorget patches on their collars and epaulettes in the same colour. Metal collar dogs of the RCMP badge are worn on the neck. Constables and NCOs wear embroidered firearms qualification badges on the bottom of their left sleeve, and their embroidered specialist trade badge on the right sleeve. If a second specialist badge is earned, the least current is worn below the firearms qualification badges. Embroidered NCO rank badges of corporal (Cpl) and sergeant (Sgt) are worn on the right sleeve below the specialist trade badge (if any). Staff sergeant (S/Sgt), staff sergeant major (S/S/M), sergeant major (S/M), and corps sergeant major (C/S/M) are worn on the bottom of the right sleeve. With RCMP badges, no badge is worn directly above a badge containing a crown. Service stars, each designating 5 years of service, are worn on the left sleeve.

In "review order," the riding breeches (jodhpurs) are "midnight blue" (virtually black) which bulge at the thigh in keeping with traditional cut with a yellow strapping (stripe) down the outside seam of each leg, and laced closed beneath the boots. The breeches are worn with braces. Finishing off the Red Serge are brown leather riding boots, known as high browns or Strathcona boots, with spurs, and a brown wide-brimmed felt campaign hat with a glass-flat brim. The side-arm, if worn, is carried in a brown leather holster on a brown Sam Browne belt. (As of 2024, weapons are either a Smith & Wesson model 5946 or 3953.) There is a brown leather pouch for carrying handcuffs and another for two spare pistol magazines. The constable, corporal, sergeant, and staff sergeant Sam Browne cross strap travels over the left shoulder. A sergeant major may have a whistle and chain on the cross strap. A white pistol lanyard is worn around the neck and connected to the side arm. "Review order" may be worn with "full" Sam Browne, or "stripped" Sam Browne where no lanyard, pistol, holster, or pouches are worn. Female RCMP members formerly wore a modified version of the Red Serge for review order without the high collar but now wear the same pattern of tunic as their male colleagues.

"Walking-out order" is worn for more formal occasions. Walking-out order consists of the felt hat; scarlet serge tunic; blue overalls (narrow-legged trousers with a strap under the foot); box spurs; congress boots; brown leather gloves; ceremonial belt and buckle; medals and decorations as ordered.

Or

Forage cap; scarlet serge tunic; blue overalls; congress boots; box spurs; brown leather gloves; ceremonial belt and buckle; medals and decorations as ordered.

== Commissioned officers ==
Commissioned officers (inspectors and above) wear similar pattern red serge tunics to non-commissioned ranks. However, their collars are solid dark blue, as are their sleeve cuffs, while non-commissioned ranks have dark blue gorget patches only. Officers do not wear any badge of qualification, specialism or long service on their tunics. Commissioned badges of rank are based on the Commonwealth style of military badges consisting of crown, star and sword and baton worn on the epaulettes. The yellow stripe on officers' breeches and males' overalls is finer material and wider than for constables and NCOs. Officers' high brown boots are of the cavalry officer's pattern. Officers also wear the cavalry pattern Sam Browne belt. This has D-rings for sword frogs, and the cross strap has a whistle and is worn over the right shoulder.

In full-dress order, officers wear the post-1945 style gold and purple sword belt with the pattern 1908 cavalry officer's sword, as well as detachable gold wire plaited shoulder cords. Officers have the option of wearing a campaign hat or forage cap with Red Serge.

The mess dress worn by commissioned officers has a scarlet cutaway jacket.

From the force's formation in 1873 to 1904, the universal pattern foreign service helmet was standard issue. However, many in the field preferred to ride wearing non-regulation cowboy hats and these subsequently became uniform issue in the form of the campaign hat.

An RCMP officer wearing the Red Serge is an internationally recognized Canadian icon.

The Red Serge is not worn as working dress when an officer is on normal duty, but is reserved for occasions such as civic ceremonies, musical rides, ceremonial parades, e.g. when escorting government dignitaries. Also, for public relations or related special events such as school career days or guard duty at Parliament in Ottawa. Members also march in funerals for police officers wearing the traditional Red Serge.

The Red Serge is also worn by RCMP members during special personal events, such as the wedding ceremony of a fellow officer, where it is not uncommon for an entire detachment of a small community to wear the Red Serge as an honour guard for the bride and groom at their wedding ceremony. Usually, if the groom is a member, he will be married in his Red Serge, in lieu of civilian formal attire.

== History ==
The red serge was adopted as part of its standard uniform by the NWMP from its establishment in 1873. In its first form, it consisted of a loose-fitting "Norfolk jacket" supplied from Canadian Militia stocks. While comfortable and practical, the Norfolk jacket lacked smartness and it was replaced after 1876 by scarlet full-dress and undress tunics manufactured by British suppliers. An elaborate ceremonial tunic of hussar style was prescribed for officers but infrequently worn. Scarlet continued to be the base color for all occasions; partially to distinguish the new Canadian force from blue-clad US Army units and partially because of the significance of red coats in the British military culture inherited from the Militia.

The NWMP Dress Regulations of 1886 provided for a simpler officers' full dress based on that of British and Canadian dragoon regiments. The 1890 regulations authorized the adoption of white patrol jackets for summer wear and brown duck (khaki) for patrol duty. The red serge was by now sufficiently well-established to serve as an icon of the NWMP, though increasingly relegated to dress and garrison wear. Photographs, however, show red serge still being worn by individual constables on field duty into the early 1900s. A dark-blue, patrol "frock tunic", of the same design as the red serge, was adopted in 1904 as alternative wear for ordinary duties. A mixture of scarlet, blue, and brown tunics were worn, according to circumstances, until after 1920 when the red serge became a dress item, with brown tunics as a standard part of the normal work uniform. This remains the practice to the present day.
