= USS Patrol No. 2 =

Patrol vessel of the United States Navy

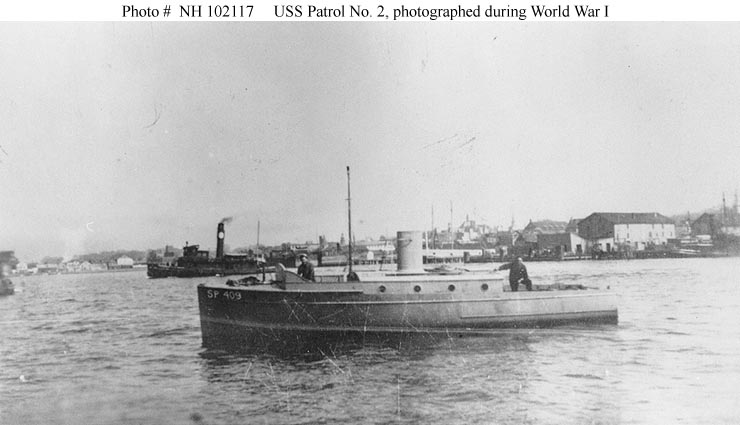
- USS Patrol No. 2 during World War I

History

United States
- Name: USS Patrol No. 2
- Namesake: Previous name retained
- Builder: Britt Brothers, Lynn, Massachusetts
- Completed: 1915 or 1916
- Acquired: 26 April 1917
- Commissioned: 19 May 1917
- Fate: Returned to owner on 20 January 1919
- Notes: Operated as private motorboat Patrol No. 2 from 1915 or 1916 to 1917

General characteristics
- Type: Patrol vessel
- Tonnage: 5 tons
- Length: 40 ft 0 in (12.19 m)
- Beam: 9 ft 0 in (2.74 m)
- Draft: 2 ft 3 in (0.69 m)
- Speed: 20 knots
- Complement: Probably 5
- Armament: 1 × machine gun

USS Patrol No. 2 (SP-409), often rendered as USS Patrol #2, was an armed motorboat that served in the United States Navy as a patrol vessel from 1917 to 1919.

== Background ==
Patrol No. 2 was built as a private motorboat of the same name in 1915 or 1916 by Britt Brothers at Lynn, Massachusetts. She was one of five motorboats built to the same design for private owners by Britt Brothers as part of the civilian Preparedness Movement program with an understanding that they would enter U.S. Navy service in time of war, the others being Patrol No. 1, which later became USS Patrol No. 1 (SP-45); Patrol No. 3, which never entered U.S. Navy service; Patrol No. 4, which later became USS Patrol No. 4 (SP-8); and Patrol No. 5, which later became USS Patrol No. 5 (SP-29).

The U.S. Navy acquired Patrol No. 2 from her owner, Joel Fisher of New York City, on 25 April 1917 and commissioned her for service during World War I as USS Patrol No. 2 (SP-409) on 19 May 1917. She operated in the 2nd Naval District, headquartered at Newport, Rhode Island, during the remainder of the United States' participation in World War I.

Patrol No. 2 was decommissioned postwar and returned to her owner on 20 January 1919.
