= School prefect =

Term used in the British education system

A school prefect is a pupil who has been given certain responsibilities in the school, similar to the responsibilities given to safety patrol members.

== United Kingdom ==
In some British, Irish and Commonwealth schools (especially but not exclusively private schools), prefects, usually students in fifth to seventh years (depending on how many years the school in question has), have considerable power. They were once allowed to administer school corporal punishment in some schools (now abolished in the UK and several other countries). They usually answer to a senior prefect known as the Head of School, Head Prefect, Head Boy, Head Girl or Senior Prefect. Larger schools may have a hierarchical structure up to and including a team of prefects, a team of senior prefects, and a Head Boy and Girl. The Head Prefect may also be the School Captain if that is an appointed position in the school. Today, prefect roles in the U.K. are largely perfunctory and are mostly used to reward the better students in the year groups that qualify for prefect roles. Duties tend to be limited to door monitoring during break and representing the school at various extra-curricular events.

The terms for two Senior Prefects, Head Boy (for the male) and Head Girl (for the female), are commonly used in the British education system as well as in schools throughout some Commonwealth countries, e.g. Nigeria and South Africa. Some schools use alternative, gender-neutral titles such as school captain, head pupil/student, head of school, or they adopt the American title of student body president. They are students who carry leadership roles and are responsible for representing the school's entire student body. Although mostly out of use, in some schools, especially when there is only one of them, they are referred to The Senior Prefect (or SP for short). They are normally the most senior prefects in the school.

Head boys and head girls are usually responsible for representing the school at events, and will make public speeches. They also serve as a role model for students, and may share pupils' ideas with the school's leadership. They may also be expected to lead fellow prefects in their duties. In most cases, a deputy head boy and girl will be appointed to assist and deputise the head boy and girl. They may have to do charity events, speak in assemblies, help out in parents evenings, and open days.

=== Praepostor ===
Praepostor (sometimes spelt Praepositor) is a term now used chiefly at some English and Manx independent schools, such as Aldenham, Brentwood, Clifton, Eton, Giggleswick, Harrow, King William's College, Rugby, Shrewsbury, Tonbridge and Uppingham as well as at other schools such as the former Derby School which began as grammar schools for the teaching of Latin grammar. It is the equivalent of prefect. The word originally referred to a monastic prior and is late Latin of the Middle Ages, derived from classical Latin praepositus, "placed before".

The use of praepostor in the context of a school is derived from the practice of using older children to lead or control younger children. This originally involved both leading in lessons and keeping general discipline, but latterly it involved only discipline.

Children helping to lead classes were also called monitors, and the terms praepostor and monitor are roughly equivalent to prefect and sub-prefect in many other English schools.

== Other countries ==
- In India, Pakistan, Sri Lanka, Singapore and Malaysia, prefects are student leaders in primary and secondary schools, often along the lines of other Commonwealth schools, but with superior powers. The prefect systems in these countries have changed little from when they were under the British, as the present governments have seen them as effective.
- In the United States, a student volunteer known as a hall monitor is sometimes charged with maintaining order in a school's corridors. Students may be selected as hall monitors because they are considered mature and responsible enough, or they may be appointed in rotation. Some schools also allow students to apply for the position. While specific duties vary between establishments, hall monitors typically check hall passes; maintain overall good conduct in the corridors; and ensure that students are punctual in attending classes.
- In Hong Kong, the British system is also practised, as it is a former British colony.
- In Bangladesh, Prefects are the leaders in Army based educational institutions namely Cadet Colleges.
- In Mexico, Prefects (in Spanish, prefecta/prefecto) is an adult head of a grade of a school, a US equivalent would be a dean.
- In Sweden, a prefect (prefekt) is the head of a university department.
- In Jesuit and other Catholic schools this title was given formerly to members of the faculty, a prefect of discipline in charge of student attendance, general order and such, and a prefect of studies in charge of academic issues.

== See also ==
- Student council
