= USCGC Patrol =

USRC Patrol or USCGC Patrol has been the name of more than one ship of the United States Revenue Cutter Service and United States Coast Guard, and may refer to:

- USRC Patrol (1905), a harbor launch in commission in the Revenue Cutter Service from 1905 to 1915 and in the Coast Guard in 1915
- USCGC Patrol (1917), a patrol boat in commission in the Coast Guard from 1917 to 1918 and from 1919 to 1940, renamed USCGC AB-38 in 1938
