= USS Patrol No. 11 =

Patrol vessel of the United States Navy

History

United States
- Name: USS Patrol No. 11
- Builder: Murray and Tregurthe, Boston, Massachusetts
- Completed: 1912
- Acquired: 27 August 1917
- Commissioned: 20 September 1917
- Decommissioned: 1918
- Fate: Returned to owner 5 December 1918
- Notes: Operated as private motorboat 1912-1917

General characteristics
- Type: Patrol vessel
- Tonnage: 16 tons
- Length: 55 ft (17 m)
- Beam: 9 ft 6 in (2.90 m)
- Draft: 2 ft 6 in (0.76 m)
- Speed: 14 knots
- Complement: 8 or 11
- Armament: 1 × machine gun

USS Patrol No. 11 (SP-1106), often rendered as USS Patrol #11, was an armed motorboat that served in the United States Navy as a patrol vessel from 1917 to 1918.

Patrol No. 11 was built as a private motorboat in 1912 by Murray and Tregurthe at Boston, Massachusetts. The U.S. Navy leased her from her owner, H. Galletin Pell of New York City, on 27 August 1917 and commissioned her for service in World War I as USS Patrol No. 11 (SP-1106) on 20 September 1917.

Patrol No. 11 operated on scout patrol in the 2nd Naval District, headquartered at Newport, Rhode Island, for remainder of World War I. She was decommissioned quickly postwar returned to her owner on 5 December 1918.
