= USS Patrol (1917) =

Patrol vessel of the United States Navy

History

United States
- Name: Patrol
- Namesake: United States Coast Guard name retained
- Completed: 1917
- Acquired: 11 April 1918
- Commissioned: 1917
- Fate: Returned to U.S. Coast Guard 28 August 1919
- Notes: Served as U.S. Coast Guard cutter USCGC Patrol 1917-1918 and 1919-1938 and as USCGC AB-38 1938-1940

General characteristics
- Type: Patrol vessel
- Displacement: 23 long tons (23 t)
- Length: 68 ft 9 in (20.96 m)
- Beam: 14 ft (4.3 m)
- Draft: 3 ft 9 in (1.14 m)
- Propulsion: Gasoline engine
- Speed: 16 kn (18 mph; 30 km/h)
- Complement: 8
- Armament: 1 × machine gun

Note: This ship should not be confused with numerous other United States Navy patrol boats that served at the same time named USS Patrol No. 1 through No. 11.

USS Patrol was a United States Navy patrol vessel in commission from 1918 to 1919.

== Construction ==
Patrol was a wooden-hulled vessel built for the United States Coast Guard at City Island, New York. She was commissioned as the Coast Guard cutter USCGC Patrol on 24 April 1917. She served in New York Harbor.

== Service history ==
=== United States Navy ===
The U.S. Navy purchased Patrol from the Coast Guard on 11 April 1918 and soon commissioned her for service in World War I as the patrol boat USS Patrol.

In Navy service Patrol remained at New York City, operating in the section patrol under the control of the 3rd Naval District for the remainder of World War I. She was returned to the Coast Guard on 28 August 1919.

=== United States Coast Guard ===
Once again in Coast Guard commission as USCGC Patrol, she remained at New York City until 1923, when she was transferred to Washington, D.C. She returned to New York in the 1930s, was renamed USCGC AB-38 in 1938, and was decommissioned in 1940.
