= USCGC Patrol (1917) =

US Coast Guard patrol boat

History

United States
- Name: USCGC Patrol
- Commissioned: 24 April 1917
- Decommissioned: 1940
- Renamed: AB-38 in 1938
- Notes: Purchased by United States Navy 11 April 1918; Served as U.S. Navy patrol vessel USS Patrol 1918-1919; Returned to U.S. Coast Guard 28 August 1919

General characteristics
- Type: Patrol boat
- Displacement: 23 tons
- Length: 69 ft 0 in (21.03 m)
- Beam: 14 ft 0 in (4.27 m)
- Draft: 3 ft 7 in (1.09 m)
- Propulsion: Gasoline engine
- Speed: 16 knots
- Complement: 1 officer, 8 enlisted men
- Armament: 1 x 1-pounder gun

USCGC Patrol, later AB-38, was a United States Coast Guard patrol boat in commission from 1917 to 1918 and from 1919 to 1940. She was the second vessel of the United States Revenue Cutter Service or U.S. Coast Guard to bear the name Patrol.

== Construction and United States Coast Guard service 1917-1918 ==
Patrol was a wooden-hulled vessel built at City Island, New York. She was commissioned as USCGC Patrol on 24 April 1917. She served in New York Harbor.

== United States Navy service 1918-1919 ==
The U.S. Navy purchased Patrol from the Coast Guard on 11 April 1918 for service during World War I and commissioned her as the patrol vessel USS Patrol. She spent her Navy career on patrol duties based at New York City.

== United States Coast Guard service 1919-1940 ==
The Navy returned Patrol to the Coast Guard on 28 August 1919, and she resumed her duties in New York Harbor as USCGC Patrol. In 1923, she was transferred to Washington, D.C. She returned to New York in the 1930s, was renamed USCGC AB-38 in 1938, and was decommissioned in 1940.
