= Junior safety patrol =

Voluntary group of students assisting other students on their ways to school

Junior safety patrol is a voluntary group of crossing guards involving older students helping younger students cross streets in elementary and middle schools across the United States and Canada. Both the Chicago Motor Club and the St. Paul Police started programs in 1920.

As of 1995, safety patrol members were located in 76 percent of the communities across the United States. AAA clubs across the United States and Canada sponsor the 500,000 member safety patrol program in 50,000 schools. Local AAA clubs supply training materials, badges and other materials, including the orange or neon green Sam Browne belt, needed to organize and operate a school safety patrol program.

== History ==
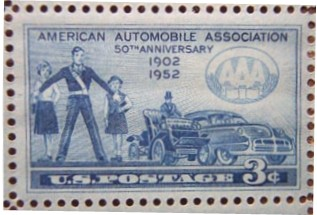
AAA 50th Anniversary stamp, issued in 1952, promotes the School Safety Patrol program

Early, the role of students in the junior safety patrol was to "teach safety and role model it." Student members were taught to "direct children, not traffic," as they had authority over the students as they crossed streets, but did not have any authority over vehicular traffic on the streets.

With the rising use of automobiles and the attendant concerns for the well-being of students as they walked to school, the Chicago Motor Club and the St. Paul Police pursued the concept of School Safety Patrols in 1920. That year St. Paul Councilman and Public Safety Commissioner Aloysius Smith, requested that the St. Paul Police start a Police program for the youth. Sergeant Frank Hetznecker was chosen to administer the program. Initially it focused on the public schools.

Sgt. Hetznecker approached the St. Paul Archdiocese to see if the parochial schools wanted to participate, and they did. The headmistress of Cathedral school, Sister Carmela Hanggi was a very strong promoter of the program. During the fall of 1920, 750 students signed up for the training program. In February 1921 the first student monitored crossing took place with students from Cathedral school.

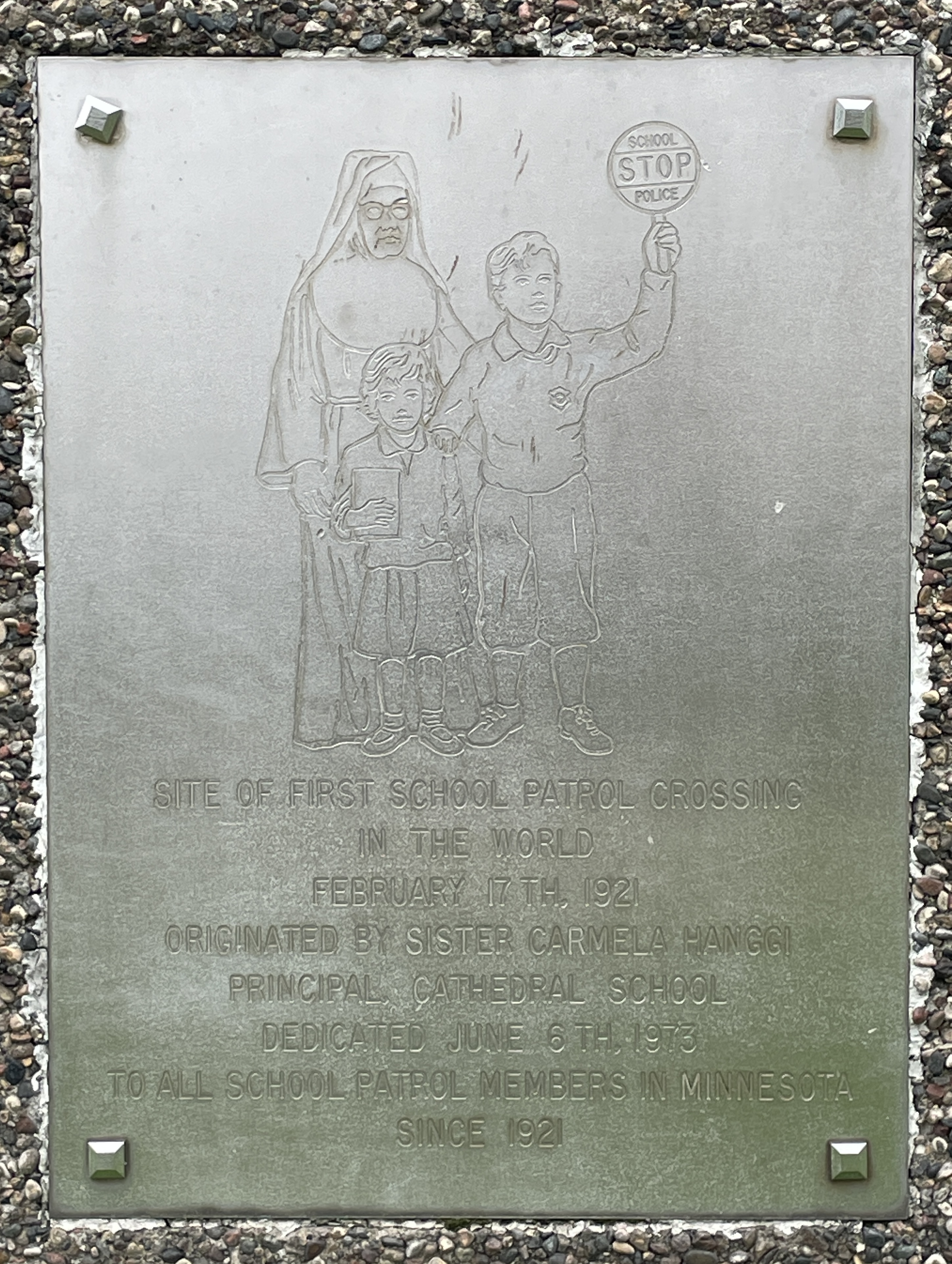
Commemorative plaque honoring the first school crossing patrol, Saint Paul, MN

Sgt. Hetznecker introduced the Sam Browne belt and badge that became synonymous with school patrol across the country and administered St. Paul's program for 30 years. The Omaha Police Department in Omaha, Nebraska instituted safety patrol program in 1923. A safety patrol was instituted in Seattle, Washington in 1928, with Seattle Police Department Captain George W. Kimball organizing the city's program, and served as director from 1928 to his death in 1961. Kids would simply come to call them School Patrol.

The junior safety patrol movement took hold in the 1930s under the sponsorship of the American Automobile Association. In 1930, a Seattle rally brought together more than 1,000 members. Yearly rallies began in 1931 in Washington, D.C., culminating in the National School Patrol Parade. The 1936 rally had more than 7,000 participants who marched on the United States Capitol. The next year had more than 11,000 participants.

Members of the Safety Patrol were originally all males and that some called "patrol boys". They were formally identified by either a badge or a white cloth Sam Browne belt, later replaced by an orange reflector vest or orange Sam Browne belt.

== Famous safeties ==
Former safety patrol members include

- U.S. Presidents Jimmy Carter and Bill Clinton;
- Dr. Gary S. Becker, Nobel Prize-winning economist;
- U.S. senator John Warner;
- former Michigan governor William Milliken;
- Joe Garagiola, member of the Baseball Hall of Fame;
- Lee Iacocca, automobile executive;
- Warren E. Burger, former chairman of the Chrysler Corporation, and; Chief Justice, and
- Burns Fessler and 21 astronauts.

== See also ==
- Crossing guard
- Hall monitor
- Jaywalking
- Marvin Klegman
- Pedestrian
- Prefect
- Traffic safety
