= Preparedness Movement =

Political campaign to strengthen the U.S. military after the outbreak of World War I

The Preparedness Movement was a campaign led by former Chief of Staff of the U.S. Army, Leonard Wood, and former President Theodore Roosevelt to strengthen the U.S. military after the outbreak of World War I. Wood advocated a summer training school for reserve officers to be held in Plattsburgh, New York.

The movement was at first opposed by President Woodrow Wilson, who believed the United States should be in a position of neutrality in order to broker a compromise peace in Europe. Several organizations were formed around the Preparedness Movement and held parades and organized opposition to Wilson's policies. After the Lusitania was sunk by German U-boats on May 7, 1915, and Pancho Villa launched his raid against Columbus, New Mexico, Wilson's attitude changed. The United States Congress passed the National Defense Act of 1916 in June 1916 to authorize an increase in the size of the U.S. Army from 100,000 men in 1916 to 200,000 on active duty and 400,000 in the U.S. National Guard, by 1921. It also padded a large long-term increase in the U.S. Navy.

== The movement ==
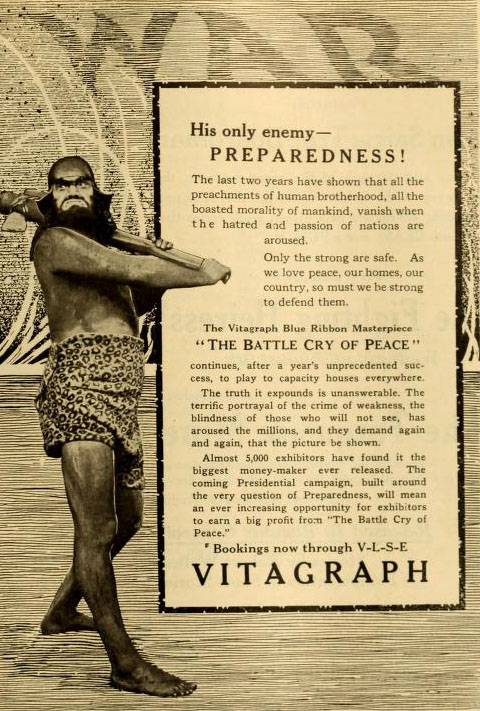
The advertisement of The Battle Cry of Peace film

In 1915, a strong "preparedness" movement emerged. It argued that the United States needed to immediately build up strong naval and land forces for defensive purposes; an unspoken assumption was that the United States would fight sooner or later. General Leonard Wood (still on active duty after serving a term as Chief of Staff of the Army), ex-president Theodore Roosevelt, and former secretaries of war Elihu Root and Henry Stimson were the driving forces behind the preparedness movement, along with many of the nation's most prominent bankers, industrialists, lawyers and scions of prominent families. There emerged an "Atlanticist" foreign policy establishment, a group of influential Americans drawn primarily from upper-class lawyers, bankers, academics, and politicians of the Northeastern US, committed to a strand of Anglophile internationalism.

A representative leader was Paul D. Cravath, one of New York's foremost corporation lawyers. For Cravath, in his mid-fifties when the war began, the conflict served as an epiphany, sparking an interest in international affairs that dominated his remaining career. Fiercely Anglophile, he strongly supported US intervention in the war and hoped that close Anglo-American cooperation would be the guiding principle of post-war international organization.

The preparedness movement had a "realistic" philosophy of world affairs—it believed that economic strength and military muscle were more decisive than idealistic crusades focused on causes like democracy and national self-determination. Emphasizing the weak state of national defenses, the movement showed that America's 100,000-man army, even augmented by the 112,000 National Guardsmen, was outnumbered 20 to one by the German Army, which was drawn from a smaller population. Reform to them meant UMT or "universal military training", i.e. conscription. Preparedness backers proposed a national service program under which the 600,000 men who turned 18 every year would be required to spend six months in military training, and afterwards be assigned to reserve units. The small regular army would primarily serve as a training agency.

This proposal ultimately failed, but it fostered the Plattsburg Movement, a series of summer training camps that in 1915 and 1916 hosted some 40,000 men largely of elite social classes, and the later Citizens' Military Training Camps that trained some 400,000 men from 1921 to 1940.

== Opposition ==
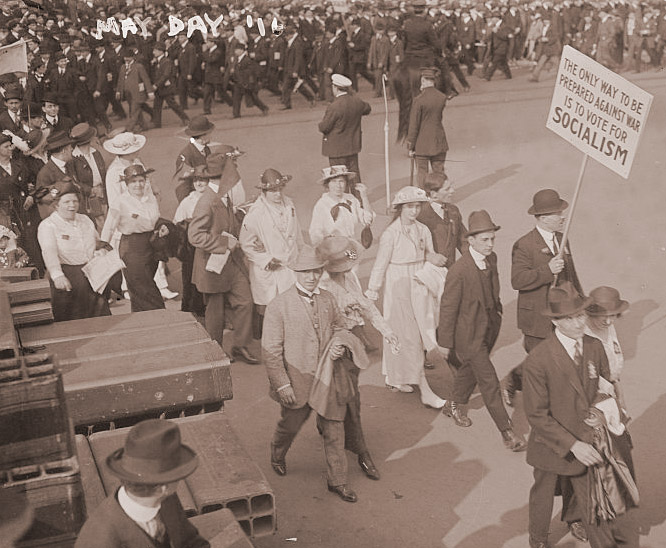
The Socialist Party was a bulwark of opposition to the preparedness movement. (May Day parade, New York City, 1916).

The Socialist Party was a bulwark of opposition to the preparedness movement. Antimilitarists and pacifists—strong in Protestant churches and women's groups—protested the plan would make the United States resemble Germany, which required two years' compulsory military service from every male citizen.

Another source of criticism of the Preparedness Movement and particularly its demands for "100% Americanism" came, quite understandably, from those increasingly dubbed Hyphenated Americans; America's enormous number of White ethnic immigrants and their descendants. Criticism from White ethnic circles occasionally argued that "100% Americanism" really meant Anglophilia, as particularly demonstrated by escalating demands for both the "Special Relationship" and for tolerating only the English language in the United States. In a letter published on 16 July 1916 in the Minneapolis Journal, Edward Goldbeck, a member of Minnesota's traditionally very large German-American community, announced that his people would, "abandon the hyphen", as soon as English-Americans did so. Meanwhile, Goldbeck argued, "Let the exodus of Anglo-Americans start at once! Let all those people go who think that America is a new England!"

Furthermore, in June 1917, anti-war essayist Randolph Bourne also raised the possibility that the Preparedness Movement may have been one of the multiple covert operations used by both French and British Intelligence propagandists in order to bring America into the war against the Central Powers, "The nerve of the war feeling centered ... In the richer and older classes of the Atlantic seaboard, and was keenest where there were French or English business and particularly social connections. The sentiment then spread out across the country as a class-phenonemon, touching everywhere those upper-class elements in each section who identified themselves with this Eastern ruling group... In every community, it was the least liberal and least democratic elements among whom the Preparedness and later the war sentiment was found."

Defenders of the Movement retorted that military "service" was an essential duty of citizenship, and that without the commonality provided by such service the nation would splinter into antagonistic ethnic groups. One spokesman promised that UMT would become "a real melting pot, under which the fire is hot enough to fuse the elements into one common mass of Americanism." Furthermore, they promised, the discipline and training would make for a better-paid work force. The hostility to military service was so strong at the time it is difficult to imagine such a program winning approval; indeed, even in World War II, when Stimson as Secretary of War proposed a similar program of universal peacetime service, he was defeated. Underscoring its commitment, the preparedness movement set up and funded its own summer training camps (at Plattsburgh, New York, and other sites) where 40,000 college alumni became physically fit, learned to march and shoot, and ultimately provided the cadre of a wartime officer corps. (Note: Very few young men from wealthy or prominent families considered a career in the army or navy then or at any time in American history. The highest social background of cadets, exemplified by George Patton, West Point 1909, and Lucius Clay, West Point 1918, was oldest son of a locally prominent family.)

Suggestions by labor unions that talented working-class youth be invited to Plattsburgh were ignored. The preparedness movement was distant not only from the working classes but also from the middle class leadership of most of small town America. It had had little use for the National Guard, which it saw as politicized, localistic, poorly armed, ill trained, too inclined to idealistic crusading (as against Spain in 1898), and too lacking in understanding of world affairs. The National Guard on the other hand was securely rooted in state and local politics, with representation from a very broad cross section of American society. The National Guard was one of the nation's few institutions that (at least in some northern states) accepted African-Americans on an equal footing with whites.

== Democrats ==
The Democratic Party saw the preparedness movement as a threat. Roosevelt, Root and Wood were prospective Republican presidential candidates. More subtly, the Democrats were rooted in localism that appreciated the National Guard, and the voters were hostile to the rich and powerful in the first place. Working with the Democrats who controlled Congress, Wilson was able to sidetrack the preparedness forces. Army and Navy leaders were forced to testify before Congress to the effect that the nation's military was in excellent shape. Wilson had to resist the demands for preparedness because there was a powerful anti-preparedness element of the party, led by William Jennings Bryan, women, Protestant churches, the American Federation of Labor, and Southern Democrats such as Claude Kitchin, chairman of the powerful House Ways and Means Committee. John Morton Blum, a biographer of Wilson, wrote: "Wilson's long silence about preparedness had permitted such a spread and such a hardening of antipreparedness attitudes within his party and across the nation that when he came in at late last to his task, neither Congress nor the country was amenable to much persuasion."

In July 1915, Wilson instructed the Army and Navy to formulate plans for expansion. In November, he asked for far less than the experts said was needed, seeking an army of 400,000 volunteers at a time when European armies were 10 times as large. Congress ignored the proposal and the Army remained at 100,000 soldiers. Wilson was severely handicapped by the weaknesses of his cabinet. According to Blum, his Secretaries of the Navy and War displayed a "confusion, inattention to industrial preparation, and excessive deference to peacetime mores [that] dangerously retarded the development of the armed services." Even more, Wilson was constrained by the traditional American non-interventionism. Wilson believed that a massive military mobilization could only take place after a declaration of war, even though that meant a long delay in sending troops to Europe. Many Democrats felt that no American soldiers would be needed, only American money and munitions. Wilson had more success in his request for a dramatic expansion of the Navy. Congress passed the Naval Act of 1916, which encapsulated the planning by the Navy's professional officers to build a fleet of top-rank status, but it would take several years to become operational.

== Wilson's program ==
Wilson, less fearful of the navy, embraced a long-term building program designed to make the fleet the equal of the Royal Navy by the mid-1920s. "Realism" was at work here; the admirals were Mahanians and they therefore wanted a surface fleet of heavy battleships second to none—that is, equal to Britain. The facts of submarine warfare (which necessitated destroyers, not battleships) and the possibilities of imminent war with Germany (or with Britain, for that matter), were simply ignored. The Administration's proposals touched off a firestorm of antiwar protest. Secretary of War Lindley Garrison adopted many of the proposals of the preparedness leaders, especially their emphasis on a large federal reserves and abandonment of the National Guard. Garrison's proposals not only outraged the localistic politicians of both parties, they also offended a strongly held belief shared by the liberal wing of the progressive movement. They felt that warfare always had a hidden economic motivation. Specifically, they warned the chief warmongers were New York bankers (like J. P. Morgan) with millions at risk, profiteering munition makers (like Bethlehem Steel, which made armor, and DuPont, which made powder) and unspecified industrialists searching for global markets to control. Antiwar critics such as Wisconsin's Republican Senator La Follette blasted them, saying there was an unnamed "world-wide organization" that was "stimulating and fomenting discord in order that it may make profit out of the furnishing of munitions of war." The only road to peace was disarmament, reiterated Bryan, speaking for the antiwar Democrats.

Garrison's plan unleashed the fiercest battle in peacetime history over the relationship of military planning to national goals. In peacetime, War Department arsenals and navy yards manufactured nearly all munitions that lacked civilian uses, including warships, artillery, naval guns, and shells. Items available on the civilian market, such as food, horses, saddles, wagons, and uniforms were always purchased from civilian contractors.

=== Peace leaders ===
Peace leaders like Jane Addams of Hull House and David Starr Jordan, president of Stanford University, redoubled their efforts, and now turned their voices against Wilson because he was "sowing the seeds of militarism, raising up a military and naval caste." Many ministers, professors, farm spokesmen and labor union leaders joined in, with powerful support from a band of four dozen southern Democrats in Congress who took control of the House Military Affairs Committee.

=== Wilson appeals to the people ===
Wilson, in deep trouble, took his cause to the people in a major speaking tour in early 1916, a warm-up for his reelection campaign that fall. Wilson seems to have won over the middle classes, but had little impact on the largely ethnic working classes and the deeply isolationist farmers. Congress still refused to budge, so Wilson replaced Garrison as Secretary of War with Newton Baker, the Democratic mayor of Cleveland and an outspoken opponent of preparedness. (Garrison kept quiet, but felt Wilson was "a man of high ideals but no principles.")

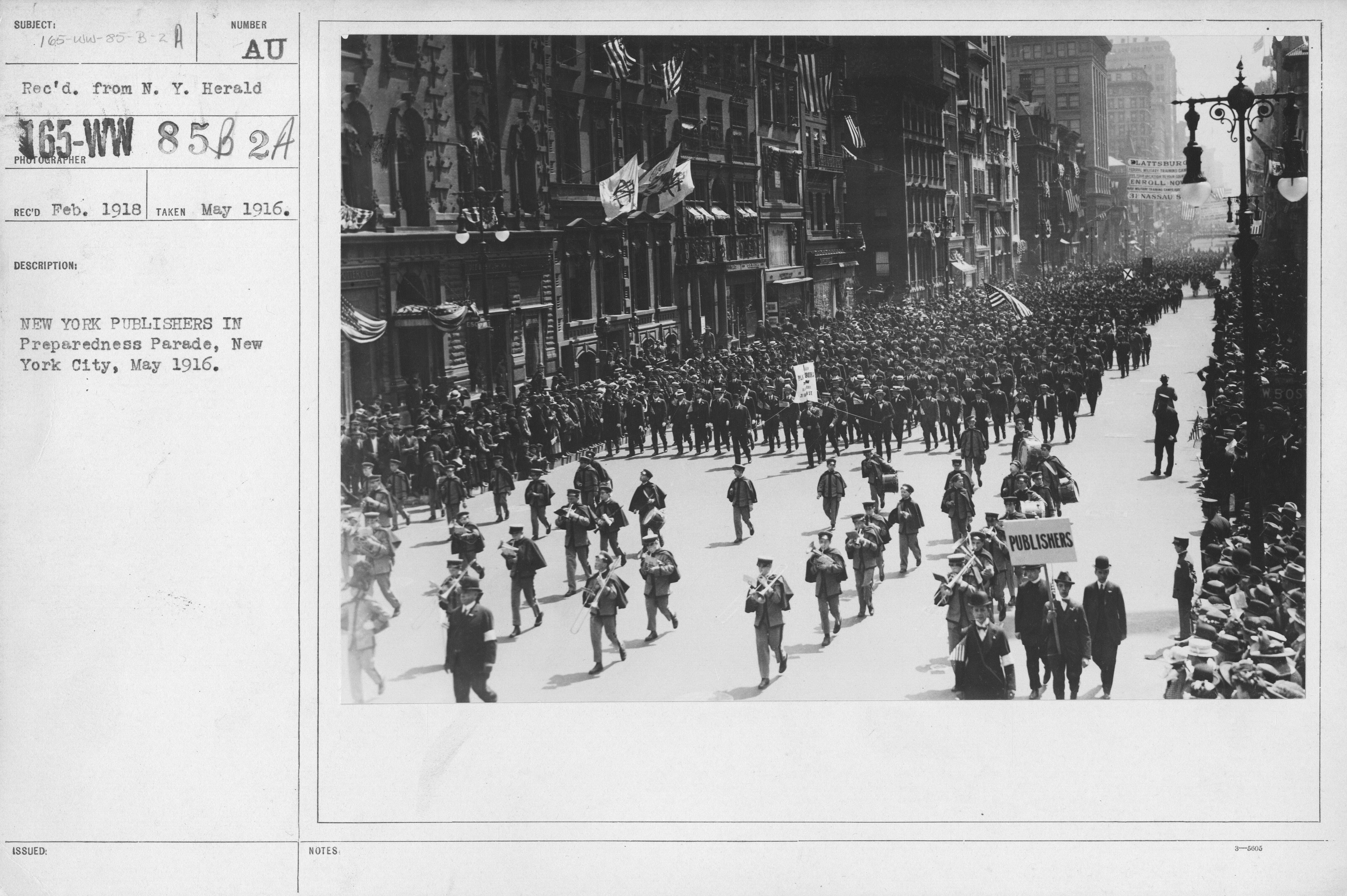
Preparedness Parade, New York City, May 1916

=== Compromise reached ===
Congress reached a compromise in May 1916. The army was to double in size to 11,300 officers and 208,000 men, with no reserves, and a National Guard that would be enlarged in five years to 440,000 men. Summer camps on the Plattsburgh model were authorized for new officers, and the government was given $20 million to build a nitrate plant of its own. Preparedness supporters were downcast, the antiwar people were jubilant. The United States would now be too weak to go to war. Colonel Robert L. Bullard privately complained: "Both sides [Britain and Germany] treat us with scorn and contempt; our fool, smug conceit of superiority has been exploded in our faces and deservedly." The House gutted the naval plans as well, defeating a "big navy" plan by 189 to 183, and scuttling the battleships. The Battle of Jutland (May 31/June 1, 1916) saw the German fleet nearly sunk by the stronger British fleet. Only brilliant seamanship and luck allowed it to escape. Arguing this battle proved the validity of Mahanian doctrine, the navalists took control in the Senate, broke the House coalition, and authorized a rapid three-year buildup of all classes of warships. A new weapons system, naval aviation, received $3.5 million, and the government was authorized to build its own armor-plate factory. The notion that armaments led to war was turned on its head: refusal to arm in 1916 led Berlin to make war on the U.S. in 1917. The very weakness of U.S. military power encouraged Berlin to start its unrestricted submarine attacks in 1917. It knew this meant war with the United States, but it could discount the immediate risk because the U.S. Army was negligible and the new warships would not be at sea until 1919 by which time the war would be over, with Germany victorious.

== See also ==
- American entry into World War I
- Citizens' Military Training Camp
- Presidency of Woodrow Wilson

== Notes ==
- Portions of this article were ported from Citizendium
