= Choreographic sequence =

Element in figure skating

A choreographic sequence is a required element for figure skating in all international competitions. It is required in the free skating programs of senior and junior single skaters and in the free skating programs of senior pair skaters. It is also required during ice dancers' rhythm dances and free dances. Judges do not evaluate individual elements in a choreographic sequence; rather, they note that it was accomplished. Skaters must meet certain requirements to earn the highest possible points during choreographic sequences.

There are seven types of choreographic elements in ice dance: the Choreographic lift, the Choreographic spinning movement, the Choreographic assisted jump/lifting movement, the Choreographic twizzling movement, the Choreographic sliding movement, the Choreographic character step sequence, and the Choreographic hydroblading movement.

== Background ==
A choreographic sequence is a required element for figure skating in all international competitions. (Note: After the 2026-2027 season, the choreographic sequence will no longer be required in the free skating programs of pair skaters.) It enhances a program's choreography. The International Skating Union (ISU), the organization that oversees the sport, defines a choreographic sequence as "an element which enhances the choreography of the program and matches the music". It "consists of at least two different skating movements like steps, turns, spirals, arabesques, spread eagles, Ina Bauers, hydroblading, any jumps with maximum of 2 revolutions, spins, etc." Senior and junior single skaters must include a maximum of one choreographic sequence in their free skating program. A choreographic sequence, in order to gain the highest grade of execution scores (+4 and +5) must match the music used and must reflect the concept or character of the program. It may also contain the following: creativity; effortlessness throughout the program, with good energy, flow, and execution; varied directions and pattern; good clarity and precision; and "excellent commitment and control of the whole body". Steps and turns in a choreographic sequence can be used to link two or more movements together.The sequence must be clearly visible.

Judges do not evaluate individual elements in a choreographic sequence; rather, they note that it was accomplished. The pattern of the choreographic sequence is not restricted, but it must be clearly visible. The technical panel identifies when a choreographic sequence begins, at its first movement, and ends, which occurs when the skater prepares to perform the next element if it is not the last element of the program. It can be executed before or after the step sequence.

== Works cited ==
- "ISU Communication 2769: Single & Pair Skating" (PDF). Lausanne, Switzerland: International Skating Union. 18 March 2026. Archived (PDF) from the original on 21 April 2026.
- "Special Regulations & Technical Rules – Single & Pair Skating and Ice Dance 2024" (PDF). International Skating Union. June 2024. Archived (PDF) from the original on 9 November 2024.
