= Moves in the field =

Figure skating elements

Moves in the field is a name given to elements of figure skating that emphasize basic skating skill and edge control. In the context of a competitive program, 'moves in the field' include spirals, spread eagles, Ina Bauers, hydroblading, and similar extended edge moves.

In the United States, moves in the field also refers to skill tests consisting of progressively more difficult edge and step patterns. Similar concepts are called field moves in the United Kingdom and skating skills in Canada. Following the abolition of compulsory figures from international competition in 1990, figure skating federations in several countries developed these drills to teach the same elements as compulsory figures within a free skating format. Whereas skaters formerly learned advanced turns such as brackets, rockers, and counters by doing them in compulsory figures, now those elements are taught in the context of standard step sequences with an emphasis on power, carriage, and flow, rather than on tracing precise patterns on the ice.

U.S. Figure Skating requires each skater to pass a "Moves in the Field" test, as well as a free skating or free dance test, in order to qualify for the various levels of competition. Skaters must perform each field move in the specified pattern while demonstrating adequate power, quickness, edge control, and extension throughout the pattern to be accepted into the level.
