= Single skating =

Discipline of figure skating

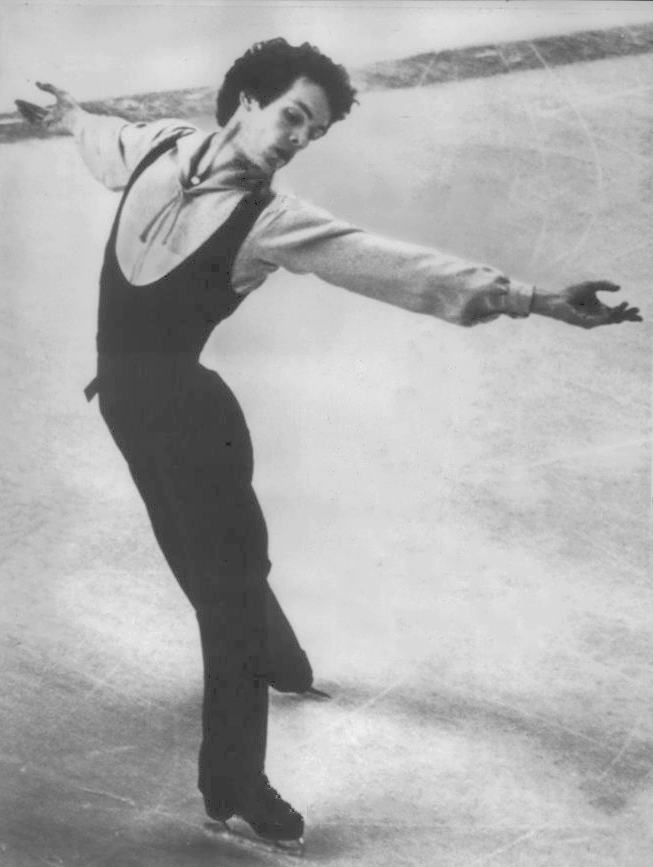
- Singles skaters Katarina Witt, 1987, and John Curry, 1976
- Highest governing body: International Skating Union

Characteristics
- Team members: Individuals
- Equipment: Figure skates

Presence
- Olympic: Part of the Summer Olympics in 1908 and 1920; Part of the first Winter Olympics in 1924 to today

Single skating is a discipline of figure skating in which male and female skaters compete individually. Men's singles and women's singles (Note: Women were referred to as ladies in ISU regulations and communications until the 2021–22 season.) are governed by the International Skating Union (ISU). Figure skating is the oldest winter sport contested at the Olympics, with men's and women's single skating appearing as two of the four figure skating events at the London Games in 1908.

Single skaters are required to perform two segments in all international competitions, the short program and the free skating program. Nathan Chen (USA) holds the highest score for combined men's short program and free skating, and Kamila Valieva (Russia) holds the highest combined score for women's short program and free skating. Compulsory figures, from which the sport of figure skating gets its name, were a crucial part of the sport for most of its history until the ISU voted to remove them in 1990.

Single skating has required elements that skaters must perform during a competition and that make up a well-balanced skating program. They include jumps (and jump combinations), spins, step sequences, and choreographic sequences. The ISU defines a jump element as "an individual jump, a jump combination or a jump sequence". The six most common jumps can be divided into two groups: toe jumps (the toe loop, the flip, and the Lutz) and edge jumps (the Salchow, the loop, and the Axel). A jump combination, defined as "two (or more) jumps performed in immediate succession". There are three basic positions in spins: the camel, the sit spin, and the upright spin. Step sequences have been defined as "steps and turns in a pattern on the ice". A choreographic sequence, which occurs during the free skating program in singles skating, "consists of any kind of movements like steps, turns, spirals, arabesques, spread eagles, Ina Bauers, hydroblading, any jumps with maximum of 2 revolutions, spins, etc.".

The required elements must be performed in specific ways, as described by published communications by the ISU, unless otherwise specified. The ISU publishes violations and their points values yearly. Deductions in singles skating include violations in time, music, and clothing. The ISU also describes regulations regarding falls and interruptions.

== History ==
The first international figure skating competition was in Vienna in 1882. Skaters were required to perform 23 compulsory figures, as well as a four-minute free skating program, and a section called "special figures", in which they had to perform moves or combinations of moves that highlighted their advanced skills. The first World Championships, hosted by the newly formed International Skating Union (ISU), occurred in 1896 and consisted of four competitors, all men. The first woman to compete internationally in figure skating was Madge Syers from England, at the 1902 World Figure Skating Championships in London. There was no explicit rule against women competing; Syers came in second place, behind Ulrich Salchow from Sweden, who, according to legend, was so impressed by her skating that he gave his gold medal to her. The ISU responded by banning women from competing at Worlds, although they created a separate ladies' category in 1906. Women were referred to as ladies in ISU regulations and communications until the 2021–22 season.

Figure skating is the oldest winter sport contested at the Olympics, starting at the London Games in 1908. It is also one of the first sport that had a separate category for female competitors, and the only women's winter Olympic sport until 1936.

== Competition segments ==
1. 1896–1973: FS + CF
2. 1973–1990: SP + FS + CF
3. 1990–Ongoing: SP + FS

=== Short program (SP) ===
Rika Kihira performing her short program at Skate Canada 2019

The short program is the first segment of single skating, pair skating, and synchronized skating in all ISU championships, the Olympic Winter Games, the Winter Youth Olympic Games, and for junior and senior level skaters, all ISU Grand Prix events and finals. The short program must be skated before the free skate, the second component in competitions. For senior and junior singles and pairs, the short program lasts two minutes and 40 seconds. For junior and senior synchronised skating, it lasts two minutes and 50 seconds, "but may be less".

The short program was introduced for the first time at the World Championships in 1973 and at the European Championships in 1974. Nathan Chen from the United States holds the highest single men's short program score of 113.97 points, which he earned at the 2022 Beijing Olympics. Russian skater Kamila Valieva holds the highest single women's short program score at 87.42, which she earned at the 2021 Rostelecom Cup in Sochi, Russia. She beat this record to score 90.45 at the 2022 European Figure Skating Championship in Tallinn, Estonia, however this result was voided following her suspension and disqualification for doping.

Men must perform seven elements in their short program, and must include a double or triple Axel jump, one triple or quadruple jump, a "jump combination consisting of a double jump and a triple jump or two triple jumps or a quadruple jump and a double jump or a triple jump", one flying spin, one camel spin or sit spin with just one change of foot, a spin combination with just one change of foot, and a step sequence using the entire ice surface. Women must perform seven elements, and must include a double or triple Axel, one triple jump, a "jump combination consisting of a double jump and a triple jump or two triple jumps", one flying spin, either a layback/sideways leaning spin or a sit or camel spin without a change of foot, a spin combination with just one change of foot, and a step sequence using the entire ice surface. Junior single skaters also have seven required elements, which can be performed in any sequence, and comprise three groups that last over three seasons. (Note: See ISU's "2024 S&P/ID Regulations" for the lists of the groups for the 2024–2025, 2025–2026, 2026–2027 seasons.) Quintuple jumps are not allowed in the short program.

=== Free skating (FS) ===
Free skating, also called the free skate or long program, is the second segment in single skating, pair skating, and synchronized skating. Its duration, across all disciplines, is four minutes for senior skaters and teams, and three-and-one-half minutes for junior skaters. American skater Ilia Malinin holds the highest score in single men's free skating program with 238.24 points, which he earned at the 2025–26 Grand Prix of Figure Skating Final in Nagoya. Kamila Valieva from Russia holds the highest single women's free skating score of 185.29 points, which she earned at the 2021 Rostelecom Cup.

After the 2018—2019 season, due to the change in grade of execution scores from −3 to +3 to −5 to +5, all statistics started from zero and all previous scores were listed as "historical".

According to the ISU, free skating "consists of a well balanced program of Free Skating elements, such as jumps, spins, steps and other linking movements executed with minimal two-footed skating, in harmony with music of the Competitor's choice, vocal music with lyrics is permitted". A well-balanced free skate consists of up to six jump elements, one of which has to be an Axel jump; up to three spins (one of which has to be a spin combination, one has to be a flying spin or a spin with a flying entrance, and one has to have just one position); only one step sequence; and only one choreographic sequence. After the 2026–2027 season, the three required spins were a combination spin, a flying spin, and a choreographic spin. (Note: Before the 2026–2027 season, junior skaters were not required to include a step sequence in their free skating programs.)

=== Compulsory figures (CF) ===
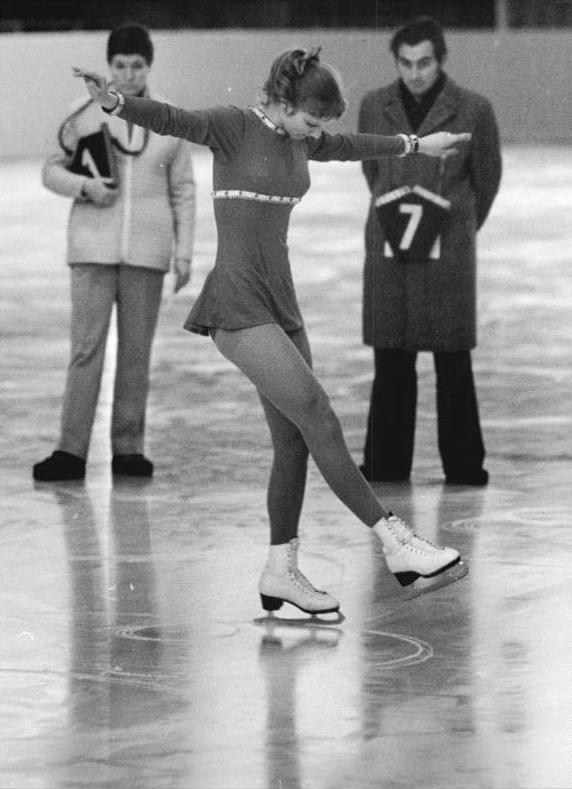
Marion Weber competing compulsory figures (1975)

Compulsory figures, also called school figures, are the "circular patterns which skaters trace on the ice to demonstrate skill in placing clean turns evenly on round circles". Until 1947, for approximately the first half of the existence of figure skating as a sport, compulsory figures made up 60 percent of the total score at most competitions around the world. After World War II, the number of figures skaters had to perform during competitions decreased, and after 1968, they began to be progressively devalued, until the ISU voted to remove them from all international competitions in 1990. Despite the apparent demise of compulsory figures from the sport of figure skating, coaches continued to teach figures, and skaters continued to practice them because figures gave skaters an advantage in developing alignment, core strength, body control, and discipline. Championships and festivals focusing on compulsory figures have occurred since 2015.

== Competition requirements ==
=== Jumps ===
The ISU defines a jump element as "an individual jump, a jump combination or a jump sequence". The six most common jumps can be divided into two groups: toe jumps (the toe loop, the flip, and the Lutz) and edge jumps (the Salchow, the loop, and the Axel). The Euler jump, which was known as a half-loop before 2018, is an edge jump. Jumps are also classified by the number of revolutions.

According to the ISU, jumps must have the following characteristics to earn the most points: they must have "very good height and very good length"; they must be executed effortlessly, including the rhythm demonstrated during jump combinations; and they must have good takeoffs and landings. The following are not required, but also taken into consideration: there must be steps executed before the beginning of the jump, or it must have either a creative or unexpected entry; the jump must match the music; and the skater must have, from the jump's takeoff to its landing, a "very good body position". A jump combination is executed when a skater's landing foot of the first jump is also the takeoff foot of the following jump. All jumps are considered in the order they are completed.

The execution of a jump is divided into eight parts: the set-up, load, transition, pivot, takeoff, flight, landing, and exit. All jumps except the Axel and waltz jumps are taken off while skating backward; Axels and waltz jumps are entered into by skating forward. A skater's body absorbs up to 13–14 g-forces on landing a jump, which may contribute to overuse injuries and stress fractures. Factors such as angular momentum, the moment of inertia, angular acceleration, and the skater's center of mass determine if a jump is successfully completed. Skaters add variations or unusual entries and exits to jumps to increase difficulty.

=== Spins ===
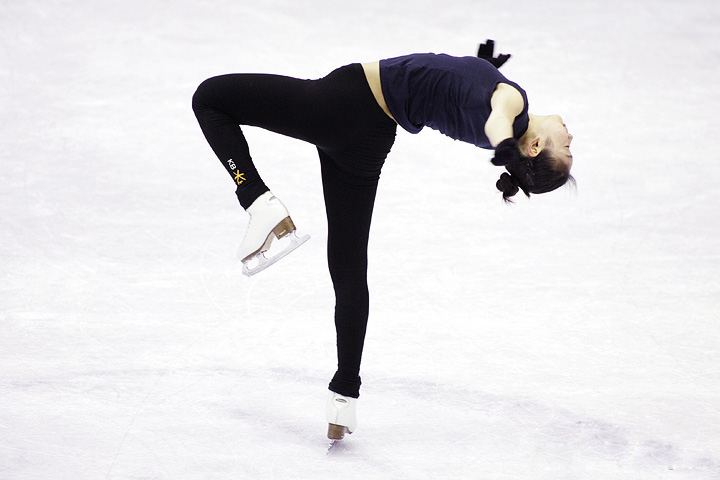
Yu-Na Kim performs a bent-leg layover spin at the 2008 Grand Prix Final.

There are three basic positions in spins: the camel, the sit spin, and the upright spin. There are two types of spins, the forward spin and the backward spin. Skaters also perform flying spins, which are the combination of a jump and a spin, as well as spin combinations. A spin consists of the following parts: preparation, entry, spin, and exit. Single skaters earn more points for performing difficult entrances into and exits out of their spins.

Spins must have the following characteristics to earn the most points: they must have good speed and acceleration; they must be executed effortlessly; and they must have good control and clear positions, even for flying spins, which must have a good amount of height, air and landing position. Also important but not required are the following characteristics: the spin must maintain a center; the spin must be original and creative; and the element must match the music. The New York Times says, when comparing spins and the more exciting jumps for single skaters, "While jumps look like sport, spins look more like art. While jumps provide the suspense, spins provide the scenery, but there is so much more to the scenery than most viewers have time or means to grasp". According to world champion and figure skating commentator Scott Hamilton, spins are often used "as breathing points or transitions to bigger things".

=== Step sequences ===
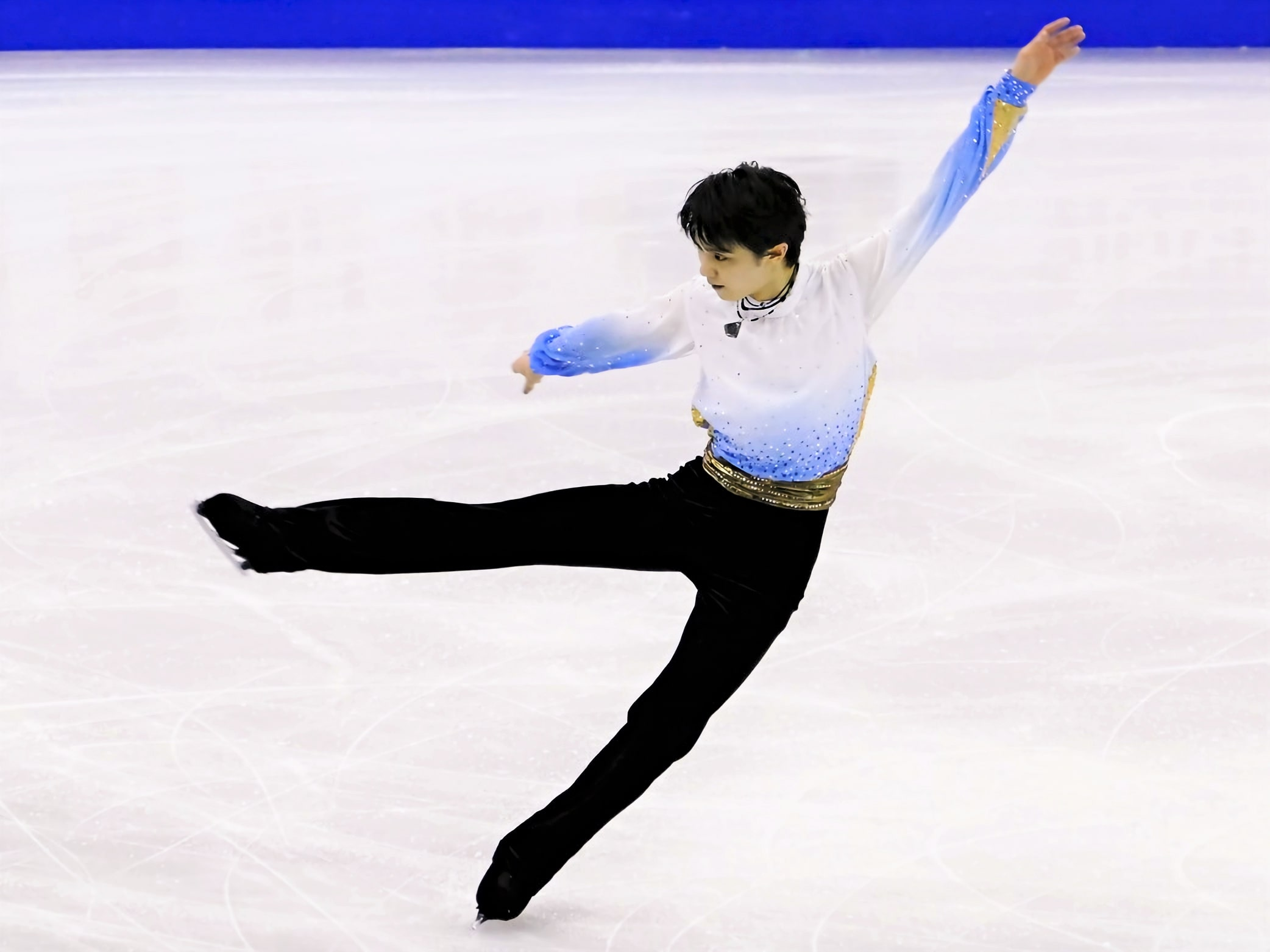
Yuzuru Hanyu performing a loop turn during his step sequence at the 2015 Grand Prix Final

Step sequences have been defined as "steps and turns in a pattern on the ice". The ISU requires that all step sequences be performed "according to the character of the music". A step sequence must have the following characteristics to earn the most points: the sequence must match the music; it must be performed effortlessly throughout the sequence, and have good energy, flow, and execution; and it must have deep edges and clean turns and steps. Also important but not required are the following characteristics: a sequence must have originality and creativity; the skater must have "excellent commitment and control" of their entire body; and the skater must have good acceleration and deceleration during the sequence. As of 2022, skaters could include single jumps as choreographic elements in their step sequences without incurring a penalty.

Skaters can make short stops during a step sequence, but they must be performed in accordance with the music. Skaters must also perform steps and turns that are balanced throughout the sequence, which includes turning in all directions, the use of both feet, and up and down movements. Skaters can choose any kind of step sequence they wish, and can include jumps, but they must fully use the ice surface. As of 2022, junior skaters were no longer required to perform a step sequence during their free skate programs; instead, they had to include a choreographic sequence because ISU officials wanted them to focus more on their program components.

=== Choreographic sequences ===
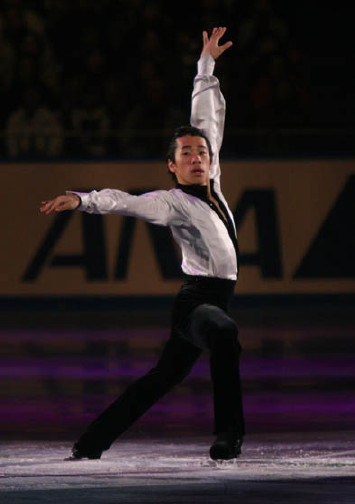
Nobunari Oda (2008) performs an Ina Bauer.

According to the ISU, a choreographic sequence, which occurs during the free skating program in singles skating, "consists of at least 2 different movements like steps, turns, spirals, arabesques, spread eagles, Ina Bauers, hydroblading, any jumps with maximum of 2 revolutions, spins, etc.". Skaters can use steps and turns to connect the two or more movements together. Judges do not evaluate individual elements in a choreographic segment; rather, they note that it was accomplished. For example, any spin or any single and double jumps included in a choreographic sequence are not included in the final score. If a skater performs a jump with more than two revolutions, the sequence is considered ended. There are no restrictions, but the sequence must be clearly visible. The technical panel identifies when a choreographic sequence begins, at its first movement, and ends, which occurs when the skater prepares to perform the next element if it is not the last element of the program.

Single skaters must include the following in order to earn the highest points possible during a choreographic sequence: it must have originality and creativity, the sequence must match the music; and their performance must be effortless throughout the entire sequence, with good energy, execution, and flow. They must also have the following: good precision and clarity; skaters must use the entire ice surface; and skaters must demonstrate "excellent commitment" and control of their whole body while performing their choreographic sequences.

== Rules and regulations ==
The first time the ISU published a judges' handbook describing what judges needed to look for during men's and women's single skating competitions was in 1965. In 2022, the ISU voted to gradually raise the minimum age requirement for participation in international competitions at the senior level from 15 years old to 17 years old over the course of the next three seasons. Violations in single skating include time, music, clothing, and falls and interruptions.

=== Time ===
The ISU states that the time a program begins "must be reckoned" from the moment the skater begins to move or skate until they come to a complete stop at the end of their program. Judges penalize single junior and senior skaters one point up to every five seconds for ending their programs too early or too late. If they start their programs between one and 30 seconds late, they can lose one point. Skaters are allowed to complete their short programs and free skates within plus or minus 10 seconds of the required times; if they cannot, judges can deduct points if they finish up to five seconds too early or too late. If they begin skating any element after their required time (plus the required 10 seconds they have to begin), they earn no points for those elements. If the program's duration is 30 or more seconds under the required time range, skaters will receive no marks.

=== Music ===
All programs in all disciplines must be skated to music. The use of music with lyrics was expanded to singles skating, as well as to pair skating, starting in 2014; the first Olympics affected by this change was in 2018 in PyeongChang, South Korea. (Note: The ISU has allowed vocals in the music used in ice dance since the 1997–1998 season.) The ISU's decision, done to increase the sport's audience, to encourage more participation, and to give skaters and choreographers more choice in constructing their programs, had divided support among skaters, coaches, and choreographers.

=== Clothing ===
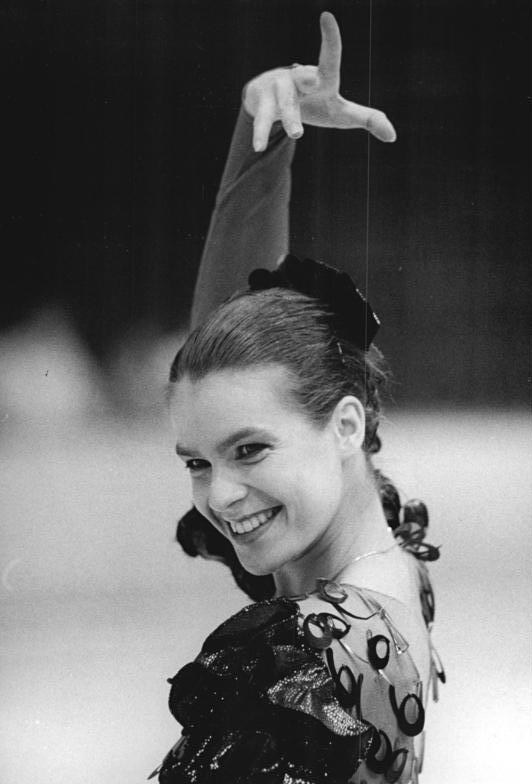
Katarina Witt in 1988

The clothing worn by single skaters at ISU Championships, the Olympics, and international competitions must be "modest, dignified and appropriate for athletic competition—not garish or theatrical in design". Props and accessories are not allowed. Clothing can reflect the character of the skaters' chosen music and must not "give the effect of excessive nudity inappropriate for the discipline".

All men must wear full-length trousers, a rule that has been in effect since the 1994–1995 season. Since 1988, the ISU required that women skaters wear skirts during competition, a rule dubbed "the Katarina Rule", after East German skater Katarina Witt, who "skated her tapdance-based short program in a showgirl-style light blue sequined leotard with high-cut legs, low-cut chest, and similarly colored feathers on her headdress and sleeves and around the hips as the only perfunctionary gesture in the way of a skirt". Decorations on costumes must be "non-detachable"; judges can deduct one point per program if part of the competitors' costumes or decorations fall on the ice. If there is a costume or prop violation, the judges can deduct one point per program.

If competitors do not adhere to these guidelines, they "will be penalized by a deduction". However, costume deductions are rare. Juliet Newcomer from U.S. Figure Skating states that by the time skaters get to a national or world championship, they have received enough feedback on their costumes and are no longer willing to take any more risks of losing points.

Also according to the New York Post, one of the goals of skaters and designers is to ensure that a costume's design, which can "make or break a performance", does not affect the skaters' scores. Designers collaborate with skaters and their coaches to help them design costumes that fit the themes and requirements of their programs for months before the start of each season. There have been calls to require figure skaters to wear uniforms, similar to those in other competitive sports, in order to make the sport less expensive and more inclusive, and to emphasize its athletic side.

=== Falls and interruptions ===
The ISU defines a fall as the "loss of control by a Skater with the result that the majority of his/her own body weight is on the ice supported by any other part of the body other than the blades; e.g. hand(s), knee(s), back, buttock(s) or any part of the arm". For senior single skaters, one point is deducted for the first and second fall, two points are deducted for the third and fourth fall, and three points are deducted for the fifth fall and any falls after that. Junior single skaters are penalized one point for every fall. Judges review falls at normal speed, not while viewing the video clip of the fall, no matter when they occur, during the execution of an element or at another time. According to former American figure skater Katrina Hacker, falls during jumps occur for the following reasons: the skater makes an error during their takeoff; their jump is under-rotated, or not fully rotated while the skater is in the air; they execute a tilted jump and is unable to land upright on their feet; and they make an error during the first jump of a combination jump, resulting in not having enough smoothness, speed, and flow to complete the second jump.

Injuries to the lower body (the knee, ankle, and back) are the most common for both single skaters and ice dancers. Single skaters experience 0.97 injuries per athlete over the course of their careers. Single skaters also tend to have more injuries caused by chronic overuse of their lower limbs or backs. Researchers Jason Vescovi and Jaci VanHeest state that 50–75% of injuries can be prevented because they are caused by "training and/or performance issues".

The ISU defines an interruption as "the period of time starting immediately when the Competitor stops performing the program or is ordered to do so by the Referee, whichever is earlier, and ending when the Competitor resumes his performance". If there is an interruption while performing their program, skaters can lose one point if it lasts more than 10 seconds but not over 20 seconds. They can lose two points if the interruption lasts 20 seconds but not over 30 seconds, and three points if it lasts 30 seconds but not more than 40 seconds. They can lose five points if they do not resume their program until three minutes after the interruption begins. They can also lose five points if the interruption is caused by an "adverse condition" up to three minutes before the start of their program.

If the quality or tempo of the music the skater is using in their program is deficient, or if there is a stop or interruption in their music, no matter the reason, skaters must stop skating when they become aware of the problem or when signaled to stop by a skating official, whichever occurs first. If any problems with the music happen within 20 seconds after they have begun their program, the skater can choose to either restart their program or continue from the point where they stopped performing. If they choose to continue from the point where they stopped, they are judged by that point onward, and their prior evaluation remains. If they decide to restart their program, they are judged from the beginning of their restart, and what they had done previously must be disregarded. If the music interruption occurs more than 20 seconds after they have begun their program, or if it occurs during an element or at the entrance of an element, they must resume their program from the point of the interruption. If the element was identified before the interruption, the element must be deleted from the list of performed elements, and the skater is allowed to repeat the element when they resume their program. No deductions are counted for interruptions due to music deficiencies.

An interruption can also be caused by an "adverse condition", which is unrelated to the skaters or their equipment, such as lighting, ice condition, items thrown onto the ice, etc. If an adverse condition occurs, the skaters may stop and report it to the referee as soon as they become aware of the problem. They must also stop skating when the referee signals them to do so. Adverse conditions related to the competitors and their equipment that occur during their programs include injuries. Other adverse conditions related to them or their equipment include, but are not limited to, their laces coming undone or damage to their clothing or skates. At that point, competitors must stop when they are warned by the referee or they become aware of the problem, whichever comes first.

When the problem is solved, skaters can continue from the point at which the interruption occurred, or if it occurred at the entrance to or during an element, immediately before the element. If the interruption caused by an adverse condition lasts over ten minutes, a second warm-up takes place. After the warm-up, the skaters must continue their program from the point at which it was interrupted, or if the interruption occurred at the entrance to or during the element, immediately before the element. No deductions are applied for interruptions unrelated to the competitors or their equipment.

== Works cited ==
- Cabell, Lee; Bateman, Erica (2018). "Biomechanics in Figure Skating". In Vescovi, Jason D.; VanHeest, Jaci L. (eds.). The Science of Figure Skating. New York: Routledge. pp. 13–34. ISBN 978-1-138-22986-0.
- Hines, James R. (2011). Historical Dictionary of Figure Skating. Lanham, Maryland: Scarecrow Press. ISBN 978-0-8108-6859-5.
- Kestnbaum, Ellyn (2003). Culture on Ice: Figure Skating and Cultural Meaning. Middletown, Connecticut: Wesleyan University Press. ISBN 0819566411.
- Petkevich, John Misha (1988). Sports Illustrated Figure Skating: Championship Techniques (1st ed.). New York: Sports Illustrated. ISBN 978-1-4616-6440-6. OCLC 815289537.
- "Special Regulations & Technical Rules – Single & Pair Skating and Ice Dance 2024" (PDF). International Skating Union. Archived (PDF) from the original on 9 November 2024.
- "Special Regulations & Technical Rules Synchronized Skating 2024" (PDF). International Skating Union. Archived (PDF) from the original on 18 October 2025.
- "Technical Panel Handbook: Single Skating 2025–2026" (PDF). International Skating Union. 25 July 2025.
- Vescovi, Jason D.; VanHeest, Jaci L. (2018). "Epidemiology of Injury in Figure Skating". In Vescovi, Jason D.; VanHeest, Jaci L. (eds.). The Science of Figure Skating. New York: Routledge. pp. 35–41. ISBN 978-1-138-22986-0.
