= Free skating =

Segment in a figure skating competition

The free skating segment of figure skating, also called the free skate and the long program, is the second of two segments of competitions, skated after the short program. Its duration, across all disciplines, is four minutes for senior skaters and teams, and three and one-half minutes for junior skaters and teams. Vocal music with lyrics is allowed for all disciplines since the 2014—2015 season. The free skating program, across all disciplines, must be well-balanced and include certain elements described and published by the International Skating Union (ISU).

== Overview ==
The free skating program, also called the free skate or long program, along with the short program, is a segment of single skating, pair skating, and synchronized skating in all ISU championships, the Olympic Winter Games, the Winter Youth Olympic Games, and for junior and senior level skaters, all ISU Grand Prix events and finals for both junior and senior-level skaters. The free skating program is skated after the short program. Its duration is four minutes for senior skaters and teams, and three and one-half minutes for junior skaters and teams. Its duration for synchronized skating is four minutes for senior teams, three minutes and 30 seconds for junior teams, and three minutes for novice teams. The ISU states that the time a program begins "must be reckoned" from the moment the skater begins to move or skate until they come to a complete stop at the end of their program. All programs in all disciplines must be skated to music of the competitor's choosing; vocal music with lyrics has been allowed in all disciplines since the 2014—2015 season. The first time vocal music was allowed at the Olympics was in 2018. (Note: The ISU has allowed vocals in the music used in ice dance since the 1997—1998 season.) Quintuple jumps are allowed in both single skating and pair skating, but only as individual jumps and not part of a jump combination or a jump sequence. Only two triple, quadruple, and quintuple jumps can be executed twice in a free skating program, and no triple jump, quadruple jump, or quintuple jump can be executed more than twice. The ISU goes on to state, about these jumps, "Of the two repetitions only one can be a quadruple jump or quint jump. If both executions are as solo jumps, the second of these solo jumps will be attributed 70% of its numerical value".

According to figure skating historian James R. Hines, the Viennese style of figure skating, which developed into the international style adopted by the International Skating Union (ISU), the organization that oversees figure skating, "provides a direct link to modern free skating". Free skating, developed when skaters connected individual compulsory figures into a cohesive program, has been a part of international competitions throughout the ISU's history, becoming more important and popular after World War II. The free skate, along with compulsory figures, was a segment in competitions until 1973, when the short program was added. The first judges' handbook for the free skating program was published by the ISU in 1965.

American skater Ilia Malinin holds the highest single men's free skating program score of 238.24 points, which he earned at the 2025–26 Grand Prix Final. (Note: After the 2018—2019 season, due to the change in grade of execution scores from -3 to +3 to -5 to +5, all statistics started from zero and all previous scores were listed as "historical".) Kamila Valieva from Russia holds the highest single women's free skating score of 185.29 points, which she earned at the 2021 Rostelecom Cup. Riku Miura and Ryuichi Kihara from Japan hold the highest pair free skating program score of 158.13 points, which they earned at the 2026 Winter Olympics.

== Requirements ==
=== Single skating ===
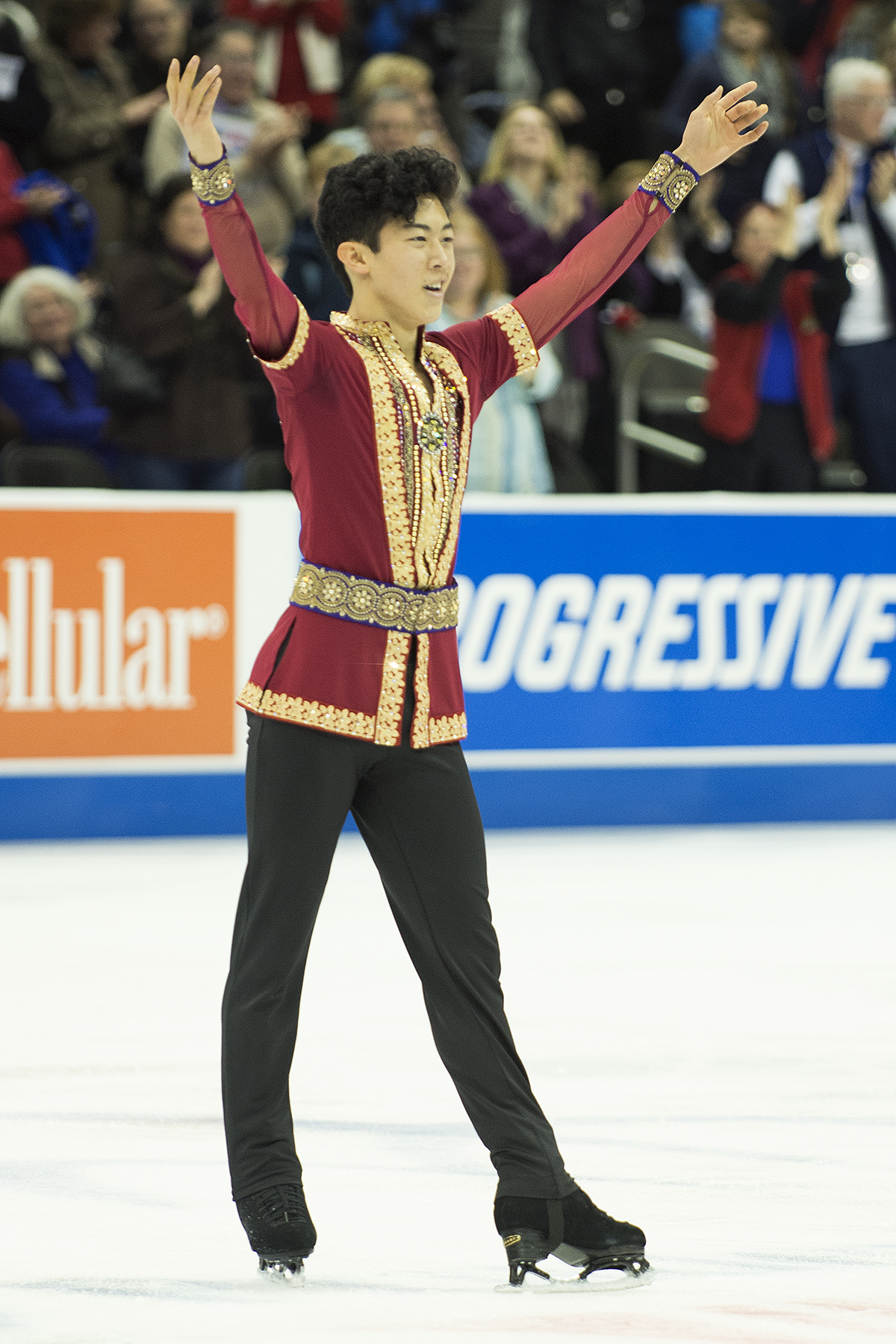
Nathan Chen after his free skate from the 2017 U.S. Figure Skating Championships

According to the ISU, a free skating program for men and women single skaters "consists of a well balanced program of Free Skating elements, such as jumps, spins, steps and other linking movements executed with minimal two-footed skating, in harmony with music of the Competitor's choice, vocal music with lyrics is permitted". Skaters have "complete freedom" to select any free skating elements they choose; the sum of the elements make up an entire free skating program. All the elements must be linked together by connecting different steps and other comparable free skating movements. Skaters must use the entire ice surface. Forward and backward crossovers, however, do not constitute connecting steps. If a skater performs more elements than are prescribed, only the first attempt, or the allowed number of attempts, is counted in their final score.

A well-balanced free skate must consist of the following:

- Up to seven jump elements, one of which has to be an Axel jump;
- Up to three spins (one of which has to be a spin combination, one has to be a flying spin or a spin with a flying entrance, and one has to have just one position). After the 2026-2027 season, the three required spins were a combination spin, a flying spin, and a choreographic spin;
- only one step sequence; (Note: Before the 2026-2027 season, junior skaters were not required to include a step sequence in their free skating programs.)
- Only one choreographic sequence

The ISU states that "[i]ndividual jumps can contain any number of revolutions". Skaters can execute up to three jump combinations or jump sequences in the free skating program and can consist of the same or a different single, double, triple, or quadruple jump. One jump combination may consist of up to three jumps, while the other two jump combinations can consist of up to two jumps. As of the 2026—2027 season, a jump combination and a jump sequence can include the same or another quadruple, triple, double, or single jump. Skaters can execute a maximum of two jump combinations or one jump combination without adding an Euler jump and one jump sequence. Skaters can execute an Euler jump only once, and it must be between two of their listed jumps. According to the ISU, "One jump combination or one jump sequence may consist of up to three jumps, the other one of up to two jumps".

Any double jump, including the double Axel, cannot be included more than two times; i.e., as a solo jump or as part of a jump combination or jump sequence. Only two types of triple and quadruple jumps can be executed twice or attempted more than twice. Jumps are judged in the order of execution. The ISU requires that "if an extra jump(s) is executed only the individual jump which is not according to the requirements will have no value". As of the 2026—2027 season, the "same type of jump independent of the number of revolutions can be included not more than three times". Skaters cannot execute any double jump, including the double Axel, more than twice when it is part of a solo jump or a jump that is part of a jump combination and/or a jump sequence. All triple and quadruple jumps can only be performed or attempted twice, and only one of the two repetitions can be a quadruple jump.

The ISU requires that all spins "must be of a different character". Skaters must include a required number of revolutions in their spins: at least ten spins in their spin combinations and six revolutions for both their flying spin and the spin with only one position. Judges count the minimum number of required revolutions from the entry of the spin, other than the wind-up in flying spins and spins with just one position, to its exit. A change in foot is optional in the spin with spin combinations and spins with only one position.

Skaters have complete freedom in selecting the types of step sequences they want to execute. They can include jumps in their step sequences, but they must fully utilize the ice surface. The ISU also states that "Step sequences too short and barely visible cannot be considered as meeting the requirements of a step sequence".

Choreographic spins were added to the free skate as of the 2026—2027 season. The ISU defines a choreographic spin as "a spin which enhances the choreography of the program and matches the music". It must match the music and reflect the concept and/or character of the program. It must also be creative, effortless throughout its execution, "a highlight of the program", have one or more well-controlled positions that match the music, and have an "intentional use of speed" that also matches the music. The choreographic spin must have at least three consecutive revolutions executed on one or two blades; any basic or non-basic positions are permitted, and a change of foot, which can be performed several times during the spin, is optional. If the technical panel is unable to identify a choreographic spin, the third spin the skater performs will be considered and judged as the choreographic spin. Once the choreographic spin is identified, a fixed base value is awarded, and then GOEs are added.

Choreographic sequences may be performed before or after the step sequence and must consist of at least two different skating movements, such as Ina Bauers, spirals, arabesques, spread eagles, hydroblading, spins, any jumps with up to two revolutions, etc. Its pattern is not restricted, but it must be clearly visible. Choreographic sequences commence with the skaters' first skating movement and conclude with the "preparation to the next element", if it is not the last element of the free skating program. Additionally, skaters can use steps and turns to link two or more different movements together.

=== Pair skating ===
According to the ISU, free skating for pairs "consists of a well balanced program composed and skated to music of the pair's own choice for a specified period of time". The ISU also considers a good free skate one that contains both single skating moves performed either in parallel (called "shadow skating") or symmetrically (called "mirror skating") and "especially typical Pair Skating moves" such as pair spins, lifts, partner assisted jumps, spirals and other similar moves, "linked harmoniously by steps and other movements".

If a pairs team performs any number of elements more than what has been prescribed, only the first attempt (or the legal number of attempts) will be included in their final score. A well-balanced free skate for senior pairs must consist of the following elements:

1. Up to three lifts, not from the same group, with the lifting arm or arms fully extended. (Note: See the 2024 "Special Regulations and Technical Rules" for a list of pair skating lift groups.)
2. Only one twist lift
3. Only one solo jump
4. Only one jump sequence or combination
5. Only two different throw jumps
6. Only one pair spin combination
7. Only one death spiral of a different type than what the skaters performed during their short program
8. Only one choreographic sequence

A well-balanced junior pair free skating program must consist of the following elements:

1. Up to two lifts that must be from different groups, with the lifting arm or arms fully extended
2. Only one twist lift
3. Up to two different throw jumps
4. Only one solo jump
5. Only one jump sequence or combination
6. Only one death spiral
7. Only one choreographic sequence.

After the 2026—2027 season, senior pair teams had to include the following elements in their free skate:

1. Up to two lifts from different groups, with the lifting arm or arms fully extended
2. Only one twist lift
3. Only one choreographic pair lift
4. Only one solo jump
5. Only one jump sequence or combination
6. Only two different throw jumps
7. Only one death spiral of a different type than what the skaters performed during their short program
8. Only one choreographic pair spin

The free skating program for junior pair skaters after 2026 contained the same elements, but instead of performing a choreographic sequence, they had to perform only one choreographic pair spin. The choreographic pair spin must match the music and reflect the concept and/or character of the program. It must also contain the following: it must match the music and reflect the concept and\or character of the program, be effortless throughout the spin, be a highlight of the program, have at least one good controlled position that matches the music, and have intentional use of speed that also matches the music.

When executing the choreographic pair lift, it must be ascending and descending while the team moves across the ice, and have at least one rotation. It has no limitations regarding the team's hold during the lift entry or at any point during the lift. The lifting partner must have straight or almost straight arm(s) reaching above the head at some point during the execution of the lift. If the judges are unable to identify the choreographic lift, the third lift the team performs will be counted and judged as the choreographic pair lift.

=== Synchronized skating ===
A well-balanced free skate for synchronized skating must consist of elements and other linking movements that reflect the character of the music the teams choose and/or express a story, theme, idea, or concept also chosen by the team. The ISU chooses and publicizes up to 14 required elements for both junior and senior teams yearly. These elements must be "linked together harmoniously by a variety of connections and executed with a minimum of two footed skating".

The required elements include:

1. An artistic element
2. A creative element
3. An intersection element
4. A group lift element (only for senior teams, when required)
5. A line or block linear element, a mixed element
6. A move element
7. A no-hold element
8. A pair element
9. A line element
10. A black pivoting element
11. A wheel or circle rotating element
12. A synchronized spin element
13. A wheel or circle traveling element
14. A twizzle element.

== Works cited ==
- "ISU Communication 2769: Single & Pair Skating" (PDF). Lausanne, Switzerland: International Skating Union. 18 March 2026. Archived (PDF) from the original on 21 April 2026.
- Hines, James R. (2011). Historical Dictionary of Figure Skating. Lanham, Maryland: Scarecrow Press. ISBN 978-0-8108-6859-5.
- "Special Regulations & Technical Rules – Single & Pair Skating and Ice Dance 2024" (PDF). International Skating Union. Archived (PDF) from the original on 9 November 2024.
- "Special Regulations & Technical Rules Synchronized Skating 2024" (PDF). International Skating Union. Archived (PDF) from the original on 18 October 2025.
