= Ina Bauer (element) =

Figure skating element

Figure skating element
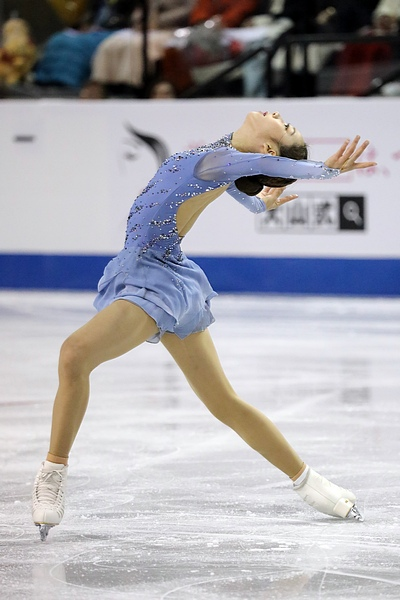
- Kim Ye-lim performing an Ina Bauer at Skate Canada 2019
- Element name: Ina Bauer
- Element type: Moves in the field
- Inventor: Ina Bauer

An Ina Bauer is a "moves in the field" element in figure skating in which a skater skates on two parallel blades. One foot is on a forward edge and the other leg is on a backwards and different parallel edge. The forward leg is bent slightly and the trailing leg is straight. If the leading leg is on the inside edge, the move is known as an inside ina bauer. If the skater is on the outside edge, it is known as an outside ina bauer. Many skaters bend backwards while performing this move, although this is not required. The most flexible skaters can bend over almost completely backwards. When performed this way, the move is called a layback Ina Bauer, after the layback position.

The move is named after Ina Bauer, who invented it.

== Technique ==
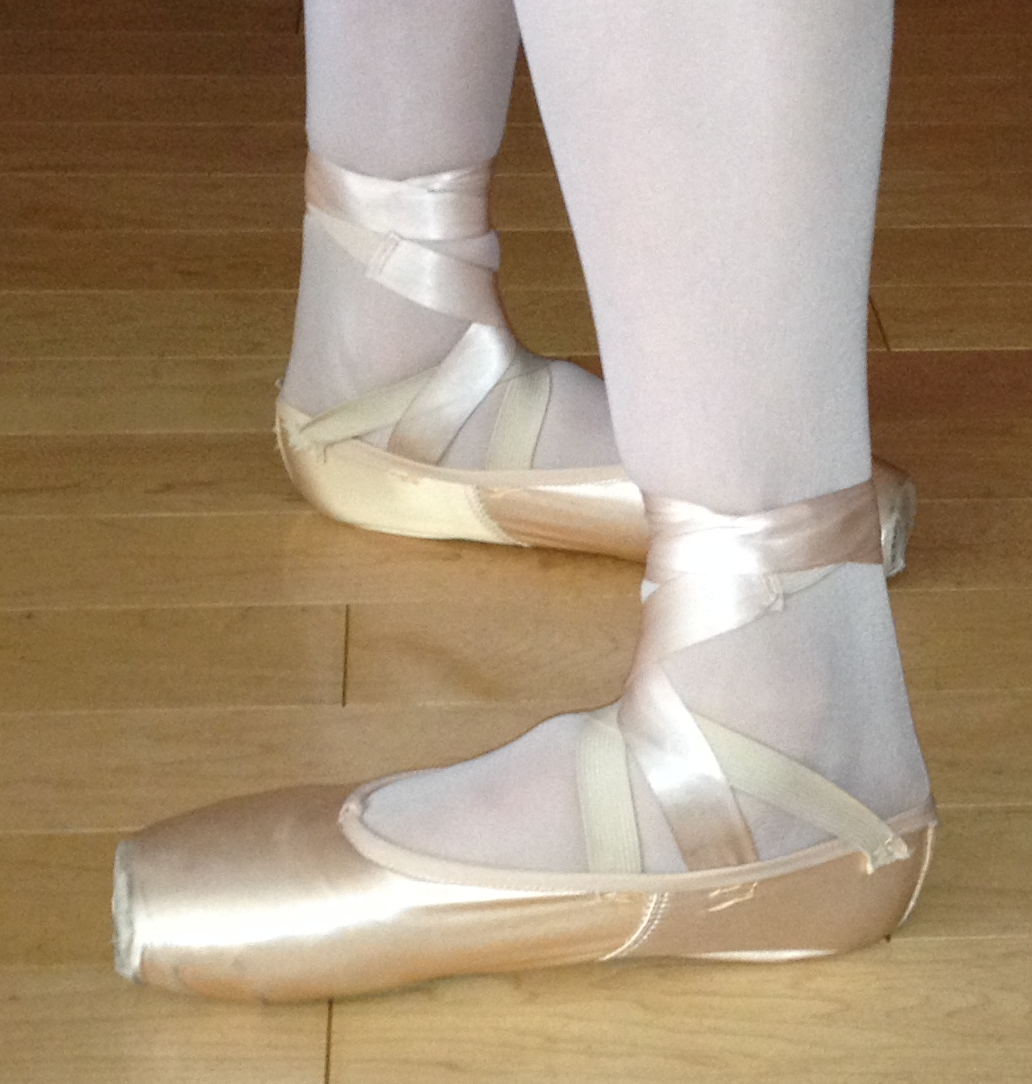
Fourth position in ballet shoes

The Ina Bauer element is an extended fourth position in ballet in terms of where the feet are placed. However, the front leg is bent and the back leg is kept straight. It can be entered into through an inside-edge spread eagle, and, like the spread eagle, is commonly used as an entrance into jumps, adding to the difficulty level of the jump under Code of Points. It can be used as an entrance to any jump because the element can be performed on either edge. For example, after the skater exits the Ina Bauer position, a double Axel jump can be executed.

The Ina Bauer can be performed on the inside edge or the outside edge. The outside edge Ina Bauer is considered more difficult than an inside edge. The back position is not mandatory, although most skaters will at least bend a little. The most flexible skaters can bend their backs until their head is nearly upside down.

The Ina Bauer is a variation of the spread eagle. The skater's feet trace parallel lines, with one leg bent deeply at their knee while tracing a shallow or flat forward outside edge. Their body is bent backward "so the other leg is on a parallel line tracing a backward inside edge".

The position can also be used in pairs and ice dancing by the lifting partner in ice dancing lifts. In this case, the lifting partner does not bend backwards.

== Gallery ==
=== In singles (inside edge) ===
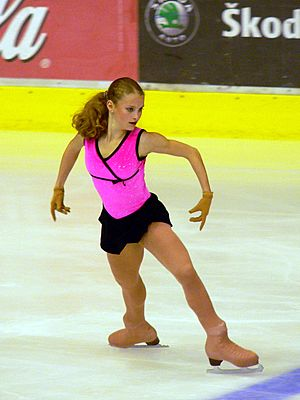
Ina bauer
(Veronika Kropotina)

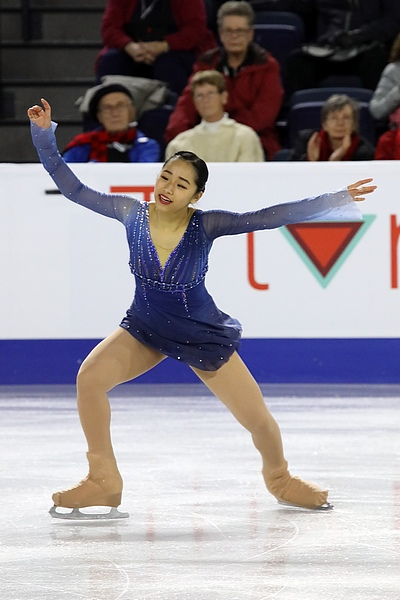
Ina Bauer (front view)
Mako Yamashita

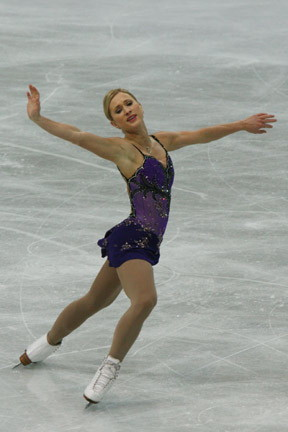
Ina bauer (side view) (Joannie Rochette)

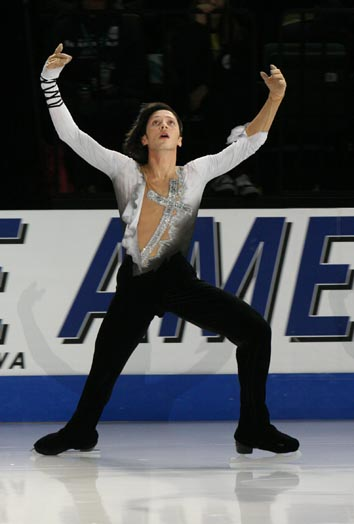
Ina bauer (front view)
(Johnny Weir)

=== In singles (outside edge) ===
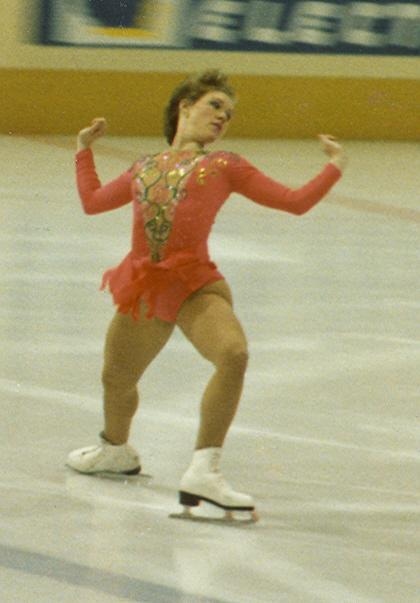
Layback Ina bauer (front view)
(Patricia Neske)

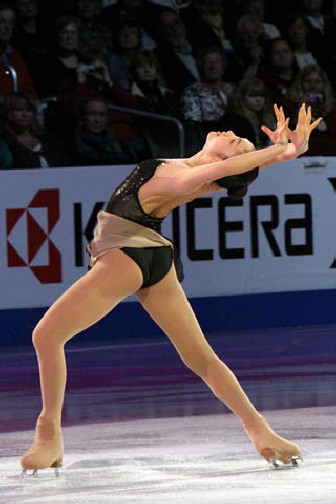
Layback Ina bauer (side view)
(Yuna Kim)

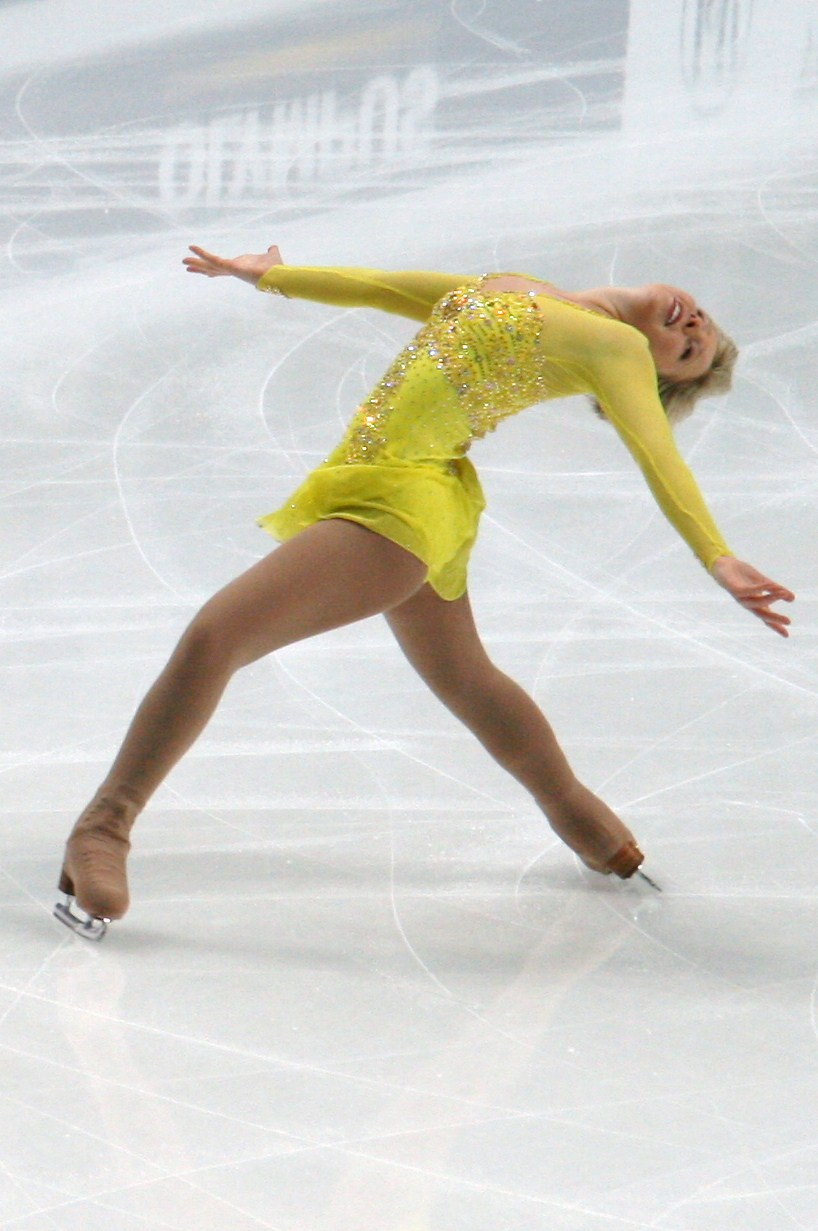
Layback Ina bauer (side view)
(Rachael Flatt)

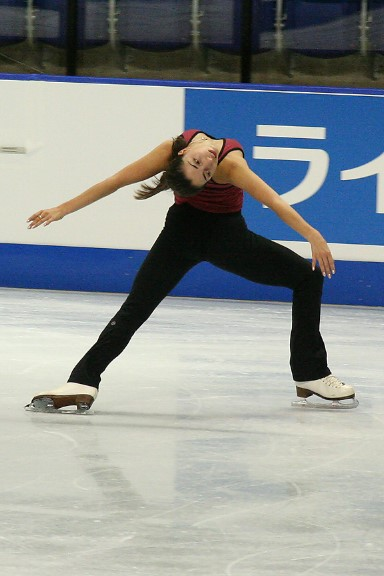
Layback Ina bauer (back view)
(Tugba Karademir)

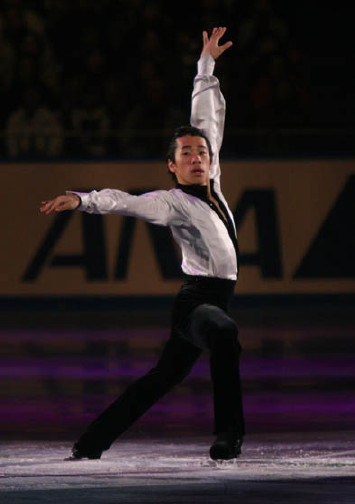
Ina Bauer (side view)
(Nobunari Oda)

=== In pairs skating ===
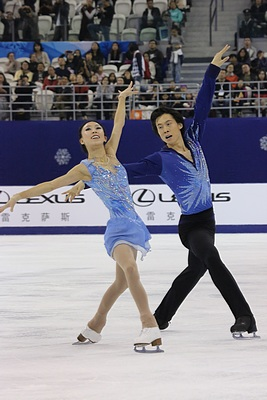
Outside edge
(Pang Qing & Tong Jian)

=== In ice dancing ===
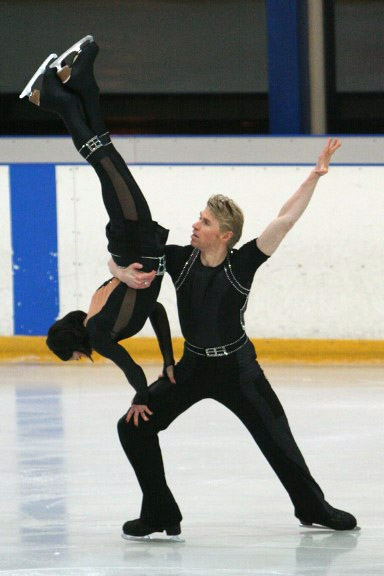
An ice dancing lift with the lifting partner in an Ina Bauer position
(Isabelle Delobel & Olivier Schoenfelder)

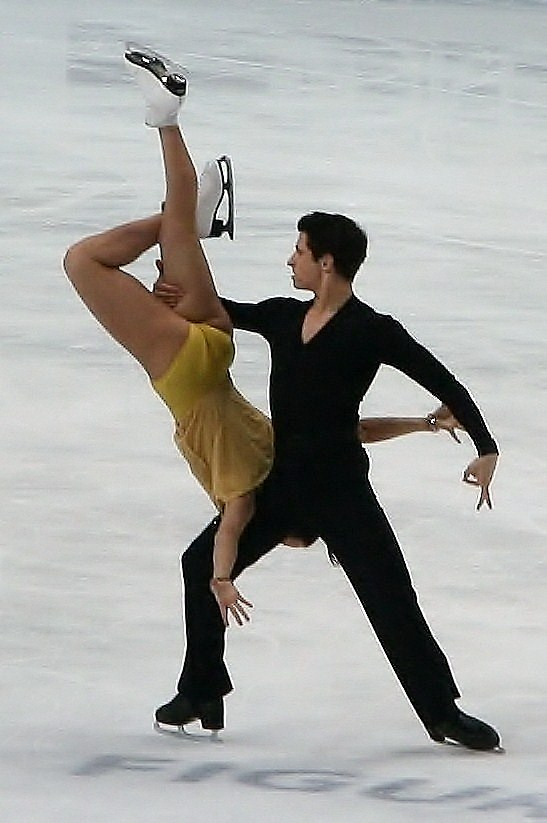
An ice dancing lift with the lifting partner in an Ina Bauer position
(Tessa Virtue & Scott Moir)

=== In synchronized skating ===
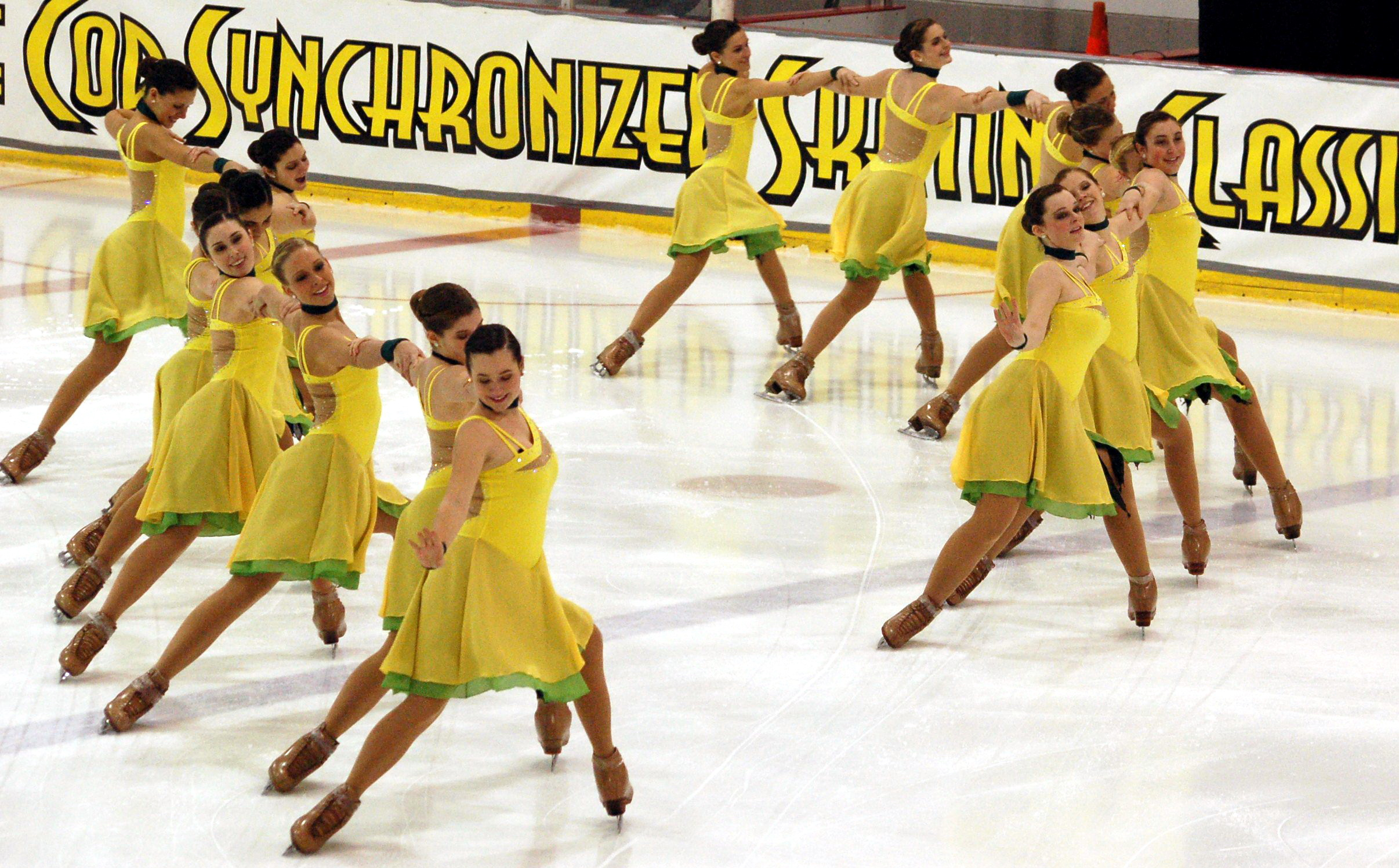
Ina bauer
(The University of Delaware Synchronized Skating Team)

== In Japan ==
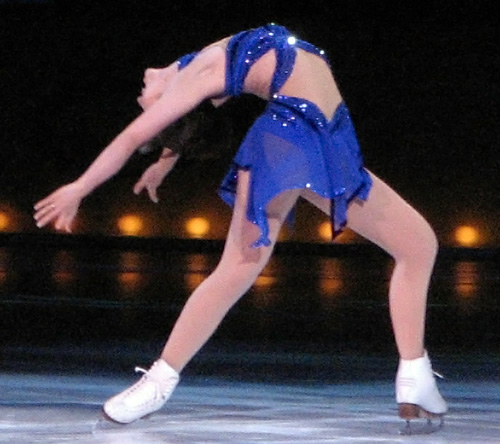
Shizuka Arakawa performs her signature layback ina bauer.

Shizuka Arakawa of Japan is famous for her flexible take on the Ina Bauer, during which she bends her back backwards until her head is upside down. This move was highlighted in Arakawa's winning free skating program at the 2006 Winter Olympics, where she performed an outside edge Ina Bauer, then performed a three jump combination (triple salchow-double toe-double loop). Because of this publicity, the term "ina bauer" has been transliterated phonetically into the Japanese word イナバウアー and has taken on a new meaning. It is a "vogue" word that has come to mean anything having to do with bending over backwards, because the term was repeated so often that many people mistakenly thought that "ina bauer" referred to the back position, not the skating involved (the back position is more exactly called the layback position, making the move combined with Arakawa's back position a "layback Ina Bauer"). In Japan, it is also known as the "Arakawa way" or the "Arakawa type" (荒川のように), after Shizuka Arakawa.

The term has become so popular in Japan that Asahi Breweries has attempted to trademark it. However, that attempt was blocked because it is a proper name and Bauer refused to give the rights.
