= Figure skating spirals =

Element in figure skating

Figure skating element
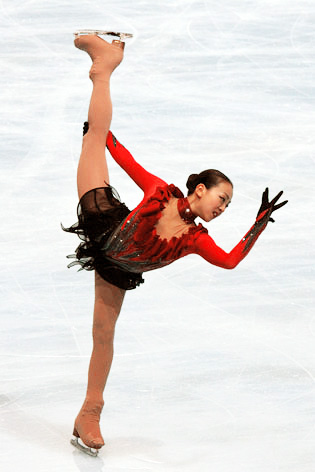
- Mao Asada performs a Kerrigan spiral.
- Element name: Spiral Sequence
- Scoring abbreviation: SpSq

A spiral is an element in figure skating where the skater glides on one foot while raising the free leg above hip level. It is akin to the arabesque in ballet.

Spiral positions are classified according to the skating leg (left or right), edge (outside or inside), direction the skater is traveling (forward or backward), and the position of the free leg (backward, forward, sideways).

== History ==
In the 1920s and 30s, spirals were performed by both women and men with similar technique. By the 1960s, however it was seen as a feminine element that was unusual for men to perform; John Curry recalled feeling judged by coaches when he practiced them. In spite of this, some male skaters are known for their spirals, such as Toller Cranston, Paul Wylie, and Shawn Sawyer.

The spiral sequence was introduced to the women's short program in 1983. During coverage of the 1992 Winter Olympics, a Canadian judge, Jean Senft, explained that it was introduced because of a perceived lack of femininity in women's programs:

As women’s skating moved from the traditional graceful approach to concentration on sheer athleticism, we began to lose something in the transition. A few years ago, women began trying many triple jumps with out much success, falling too often and destroying the beauty of their pro grams. The spiral sequence was brought in to help restore the grace and beauty of women’s skating.

Spirals were a required element in women's singles and pair skating until the 2012–13 season.

== Edges and technique ==
The name "spiral" is indicative of the skating edge. This move is generally (but not exclusively) demonstrated on a deep inside or outside edge, either forward or backward. As the skater moves, they glide slightly to the left or right (depending on the edge used), and continues in a spiral pattern around the ice if held long enough.

The basic spiral is performed with the free leg stretched and extended to the rear above hip level. Many skaters try to lift the leg as high as possible, but more important than the height of the free leg is that it be fully stretched and that the tension of the position be maintained in the upper body as well.

Judges look at the depth, stability, and control of the skating edge, speed and ice coverage, extension, and other factors. Some skaters are able to change edges during a spiral. Michelle Kwan was known for her change-of-edge spiral, in which she maintained a fixed arabesque position while changing from an inside to outside edge.

== Spiral sequence ==
A "spiral sequence" is a series of spiral moves performed together. The spiral sequence was a required element for women's and pairs' skating in international competition prior to the 2012–13 season; under the rules for the ISU Judging System, the skater needed to hold each spiral position for at least 3 seconds to have received credit for it.

A spiral sequence often included a change of edge spiral. The same spiral position was held, but the skater changed the edge he or she was skating on. The most common was forward inside edge to forward outside edge.

From the 2012–13 season and onward, the spiral sequence was replaced by the choreographic sequence. The choreographic sequence is required for men's, women's and pairs' free skating. The choreographic sequence consists of moves in the field, unlisted jumps, spinning movements, etc.

== Variations ==
Spirals can also be performed in other positions, such as with the free leg extended forward or to the side, with a bent knee, or with the leg, knee, or skate supported with one or both hands. There are many variations and some names, while not necessarily official, have come into common use.

An arabesque spiral is the basic spiral position. The free leg is extended behind the body above hip height (at least a 90-degree angle). Some skaters are able to achieve vertical (180 degrees) with this position, but it is not required.

A catch-foot spiral does not refer to any single position, but generally refers to any spiral with the skate of the free leg being held in one or both hands. Catchfoot spirals include:

- The Biellmann spiral is performed with the free leg grasped from behind and pulled overhead in the Biellmann position. This spiral may be performed on any of the spiral edges.

- A cross-grab spiral is a catch-foot spiral with the skate of the free leg grasped from behind by the opposite hand (e.g. right skate held by the left hand, left skate held by the right hand)

- A Y-spiral is performed with the skate of the free leg held out to the side. This is usually performed as a catch-foot spiral, although some skaters have increased the difficulty of this position by releasing the foot and holding the leg position unsupported.

A Charlotte spiral is a variation in which the torso is dropped down forward toward the skating leg and the free leg is lifted behind in a near-split position.

A Kerrigan spiral is a high-leg outside spiral performed with one hand supporting the knee of the free leg. This position is named after Nancy Kerrigan.

A skid spiral (also known as a slide spiral) is a difficult 180-degree turn on the ice performed in a spiral position, using a skidden three turn to change directions. It was invented by Robin Cousins, and was notably performed by Sasha Cohen and Evgenia Medvedeva.

A fan spiral is a back outside edge spiral held with the free leg held unsupported to the skater's front or side. Ideally, this position should be held with both legs straight, although less flexible skaters attempt to compensate for a lack of strength or flexibility by not fully extending the free leg or bending the skating leg.

An inverted spiral is a variation performed with the free leg held in front with the skater leaning backward over the edge of the skating foot so that the skater's upper body is held almost parallel to the ice. The position attained in this spiral is similar to that of a layover camel.

== Photo gallery ==
=== Single skating ===
==== Assisted spiral positions ====
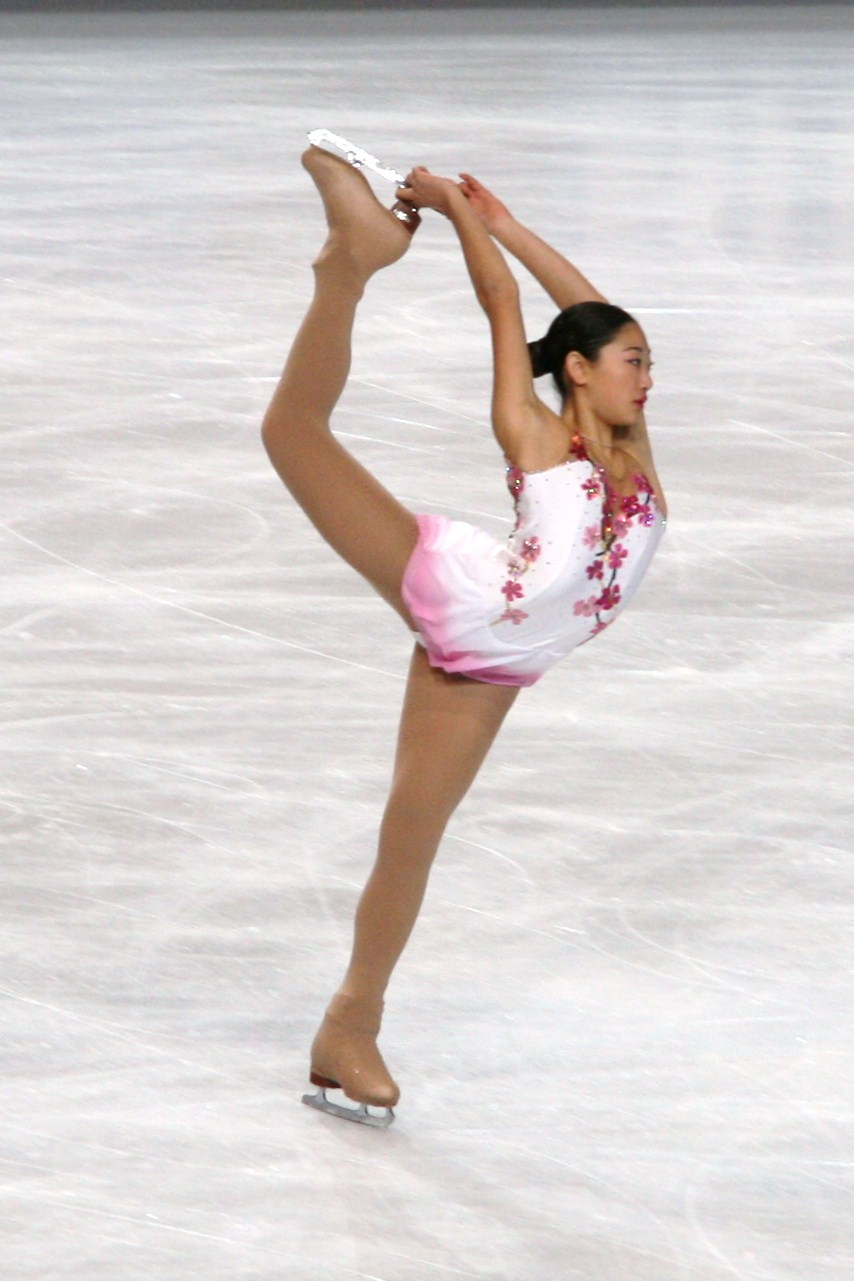
Two-handed Biellmann spiral
(Side view)
(Mirai Nagasu)

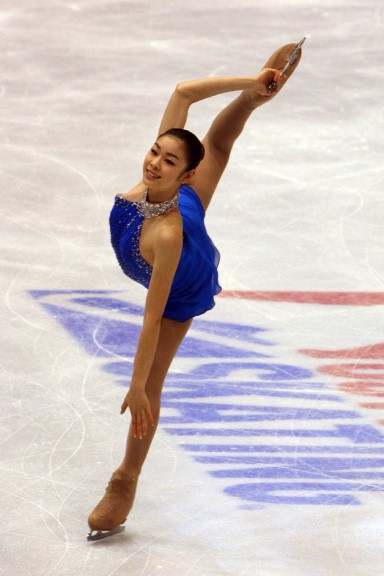
One-handed Biellmann spiral
(Front view)
(Yuna Kim)

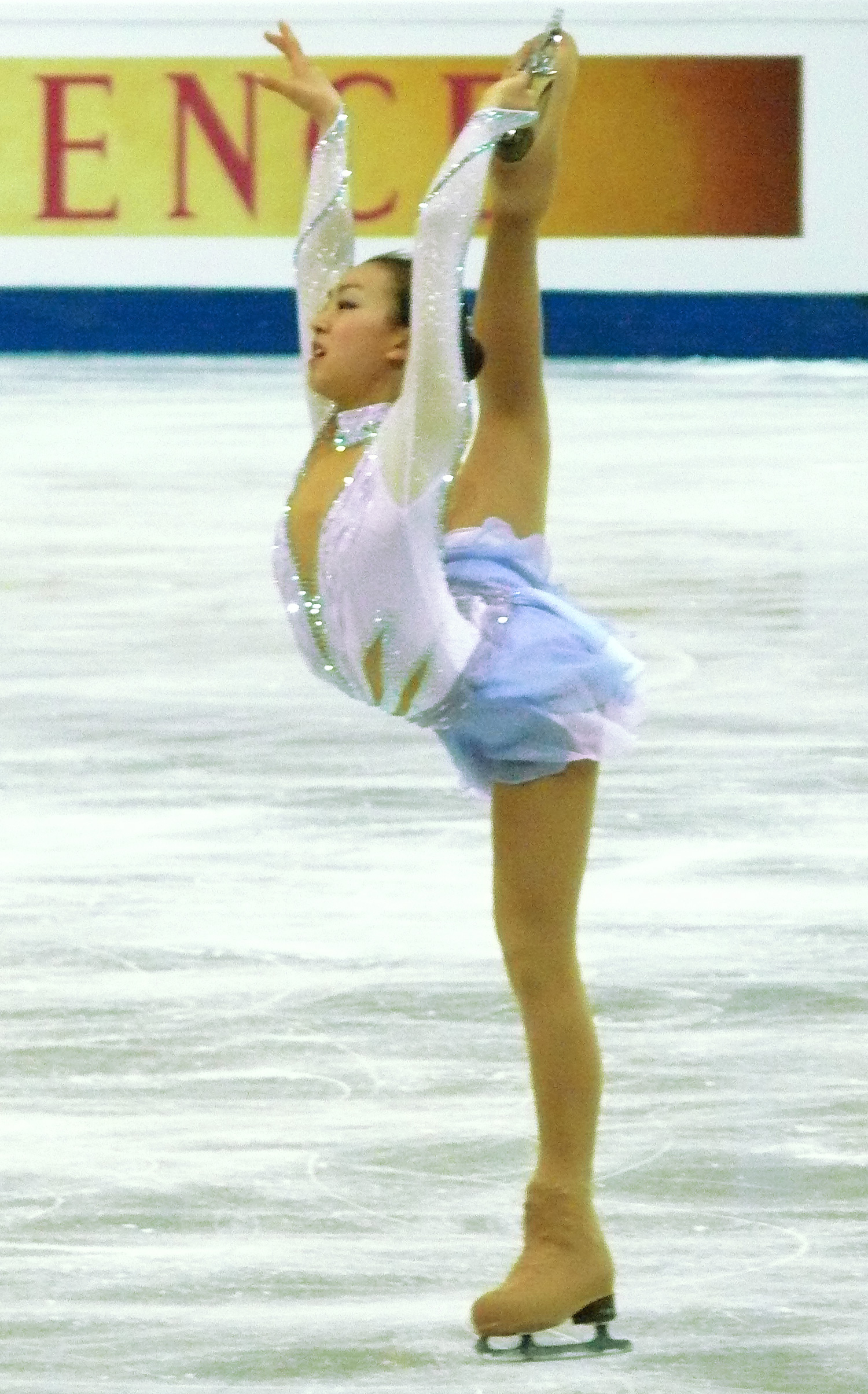
Cross-grab one-hand Biellmann spiral
(Mao Asada)

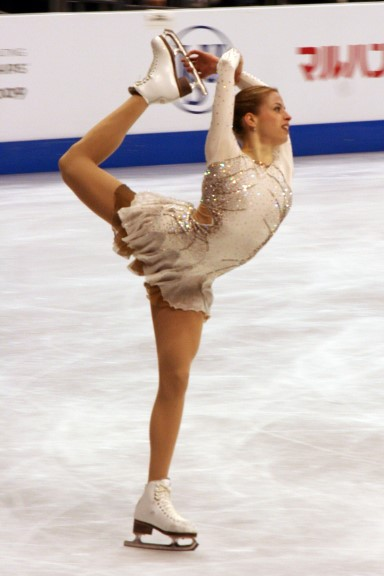
Catch-foot spiral
(Side view)
(Carolina Kostner)

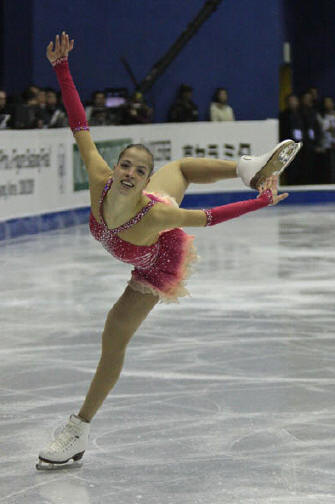
Cross-grab catch-foot spiral
(Front view)
(Carolina Kostner)

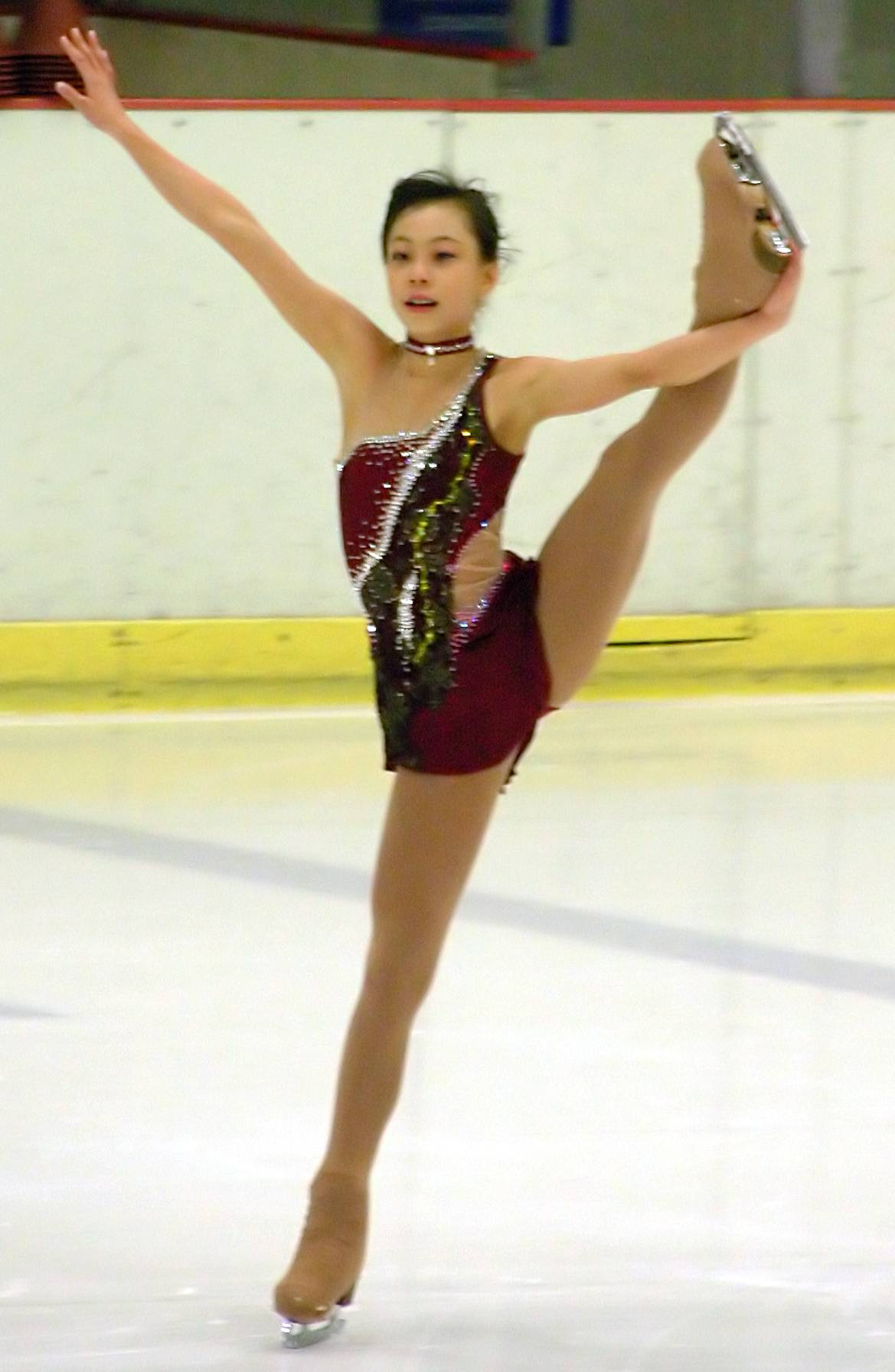
135 leg lift/spiral
(Kwak Min-jeong)

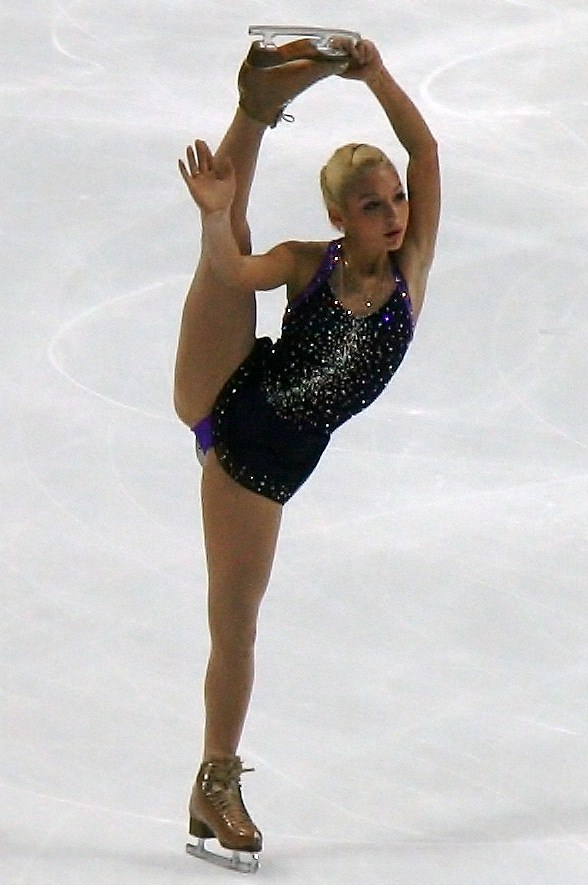
One-handed I-position spiral
(Elene Gedevanishvili)

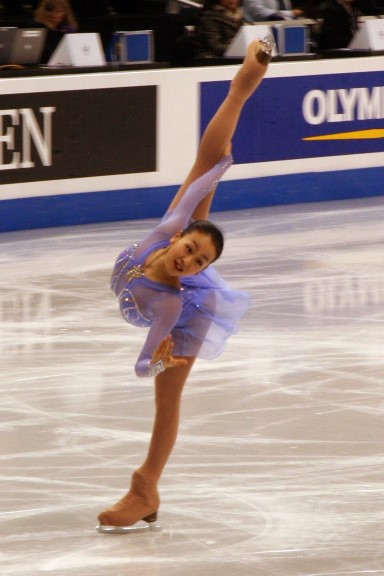
Kerrigan spiral
(Front view)
(Mao Asada)

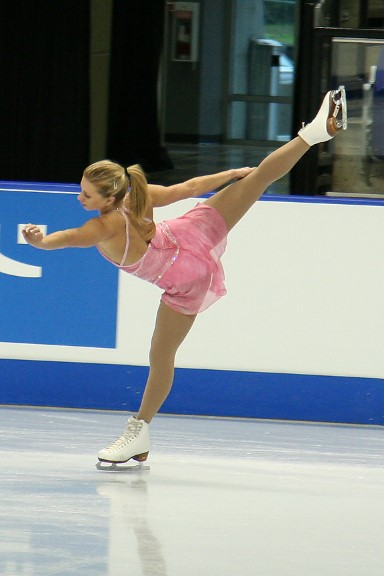
Kerrigan spiral
(Side view)
(Joannie Rochette)

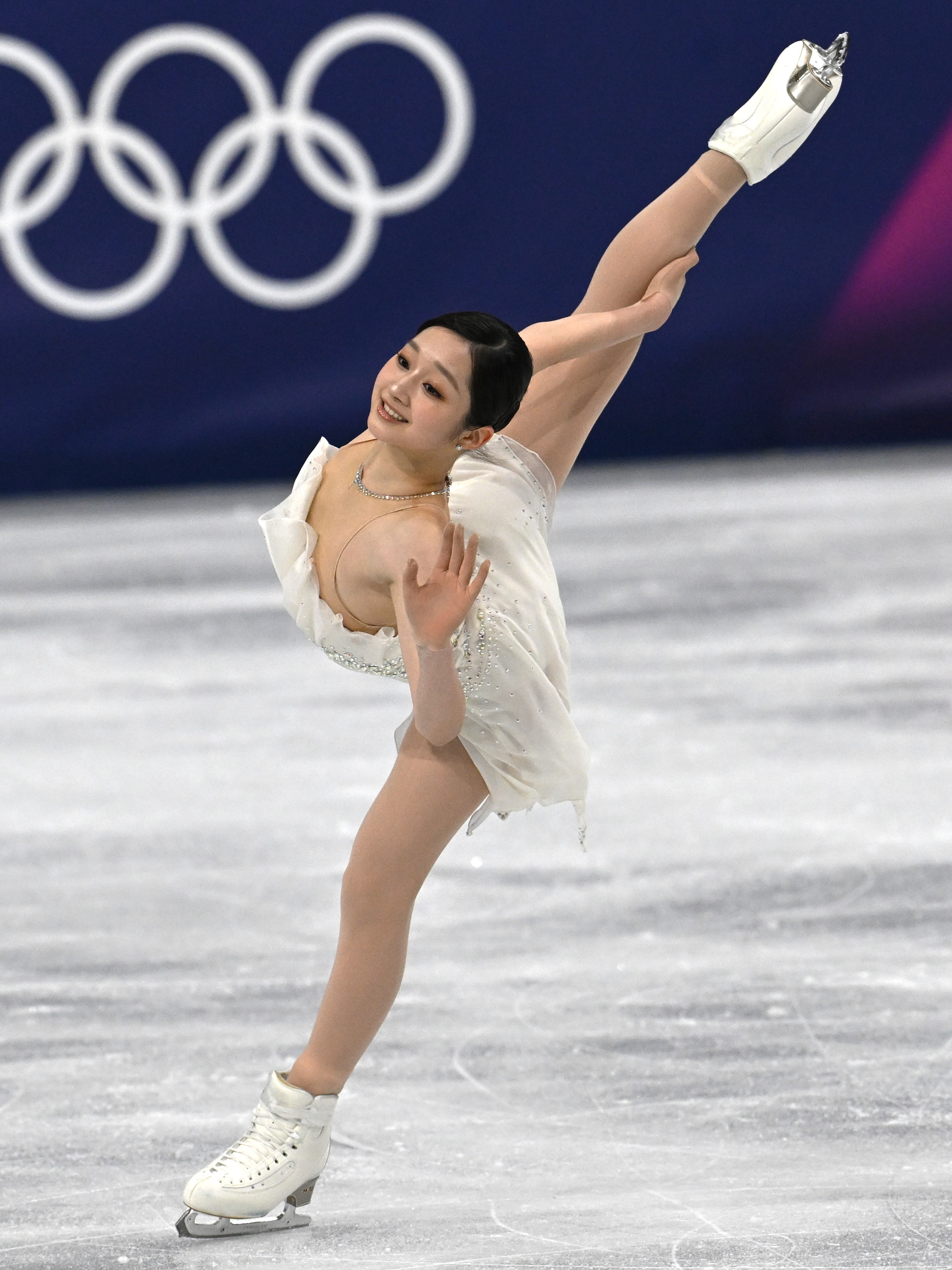
Kerrigan spiral
(Shin Ji-a)

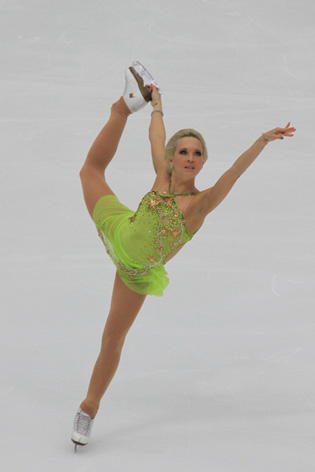
Catch-foot spiral
(Annette Dytrt)

==== Unassisted spiral positions ====
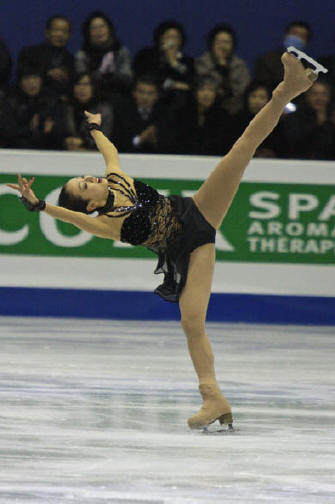
Fan spiral
(side view)
(Mao Asada)

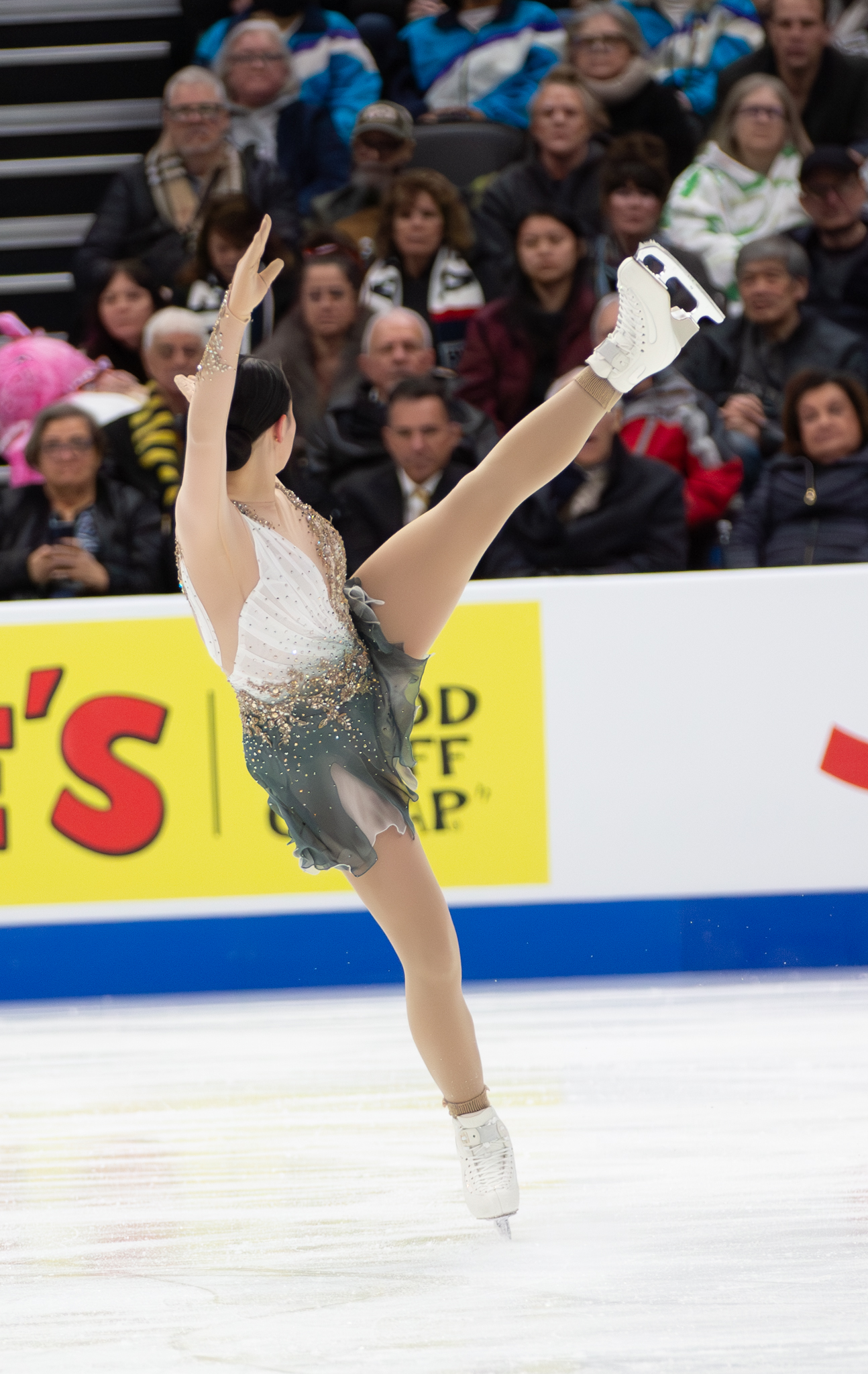
Fan spiral
(side view)
(Elyce Lin-Gracey)

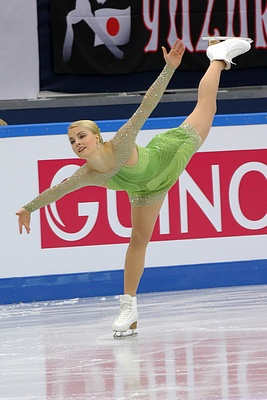
Arabesque spiral
(front view)
(Kiira Korpi)

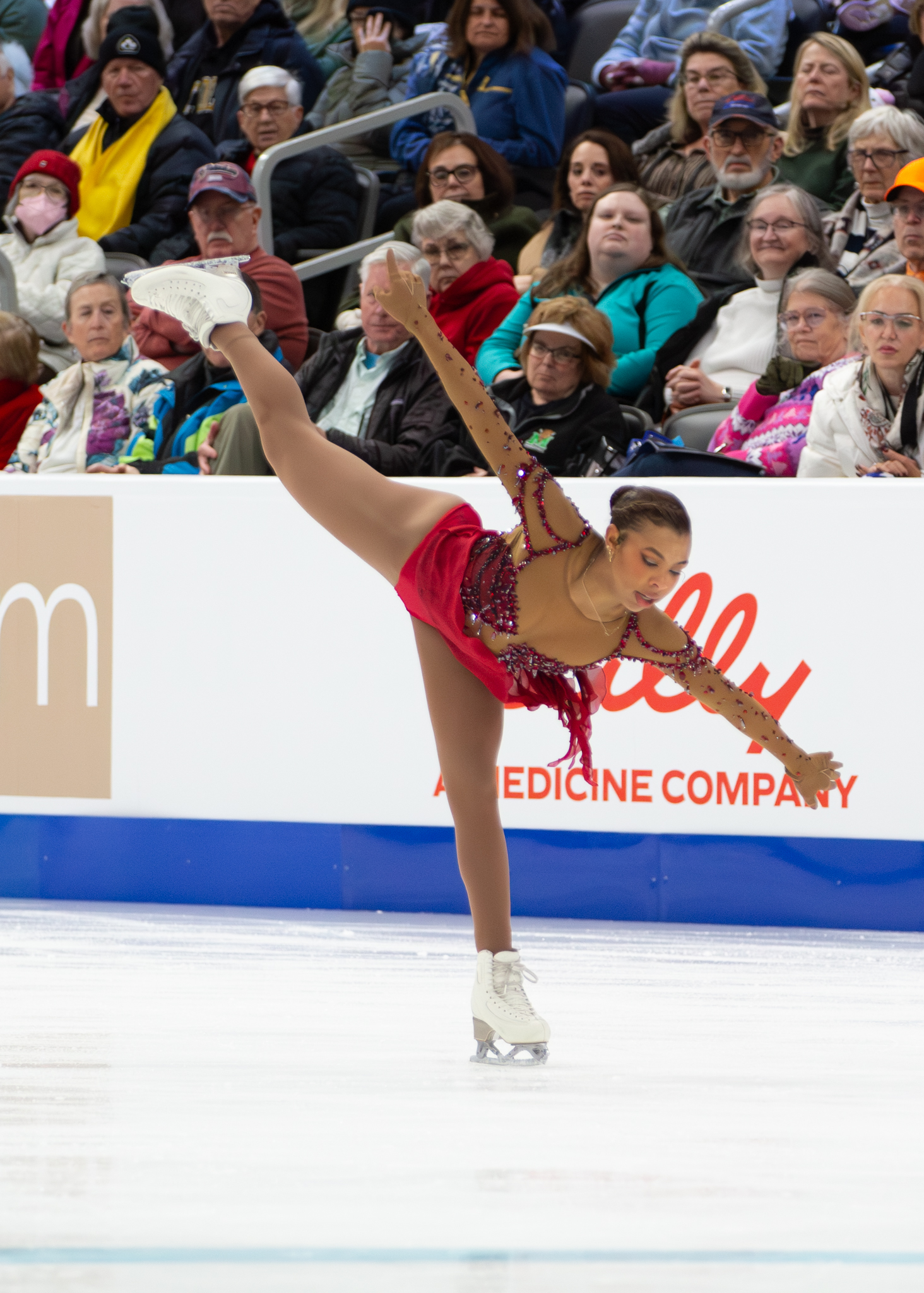
Arabesque spiral
(front view)
(Starr Andrews)

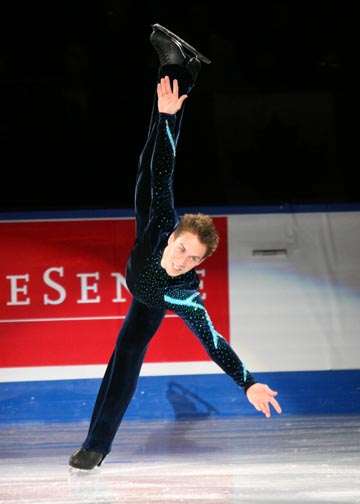
A male skater performing
an arabesque spiral
(Front view)
(Shawn Sawyer)

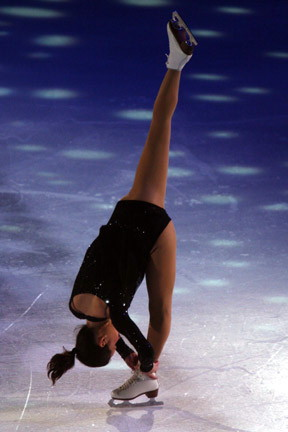
Charlotte spiral
(Sasha Cohen)

=== Pair skating ===
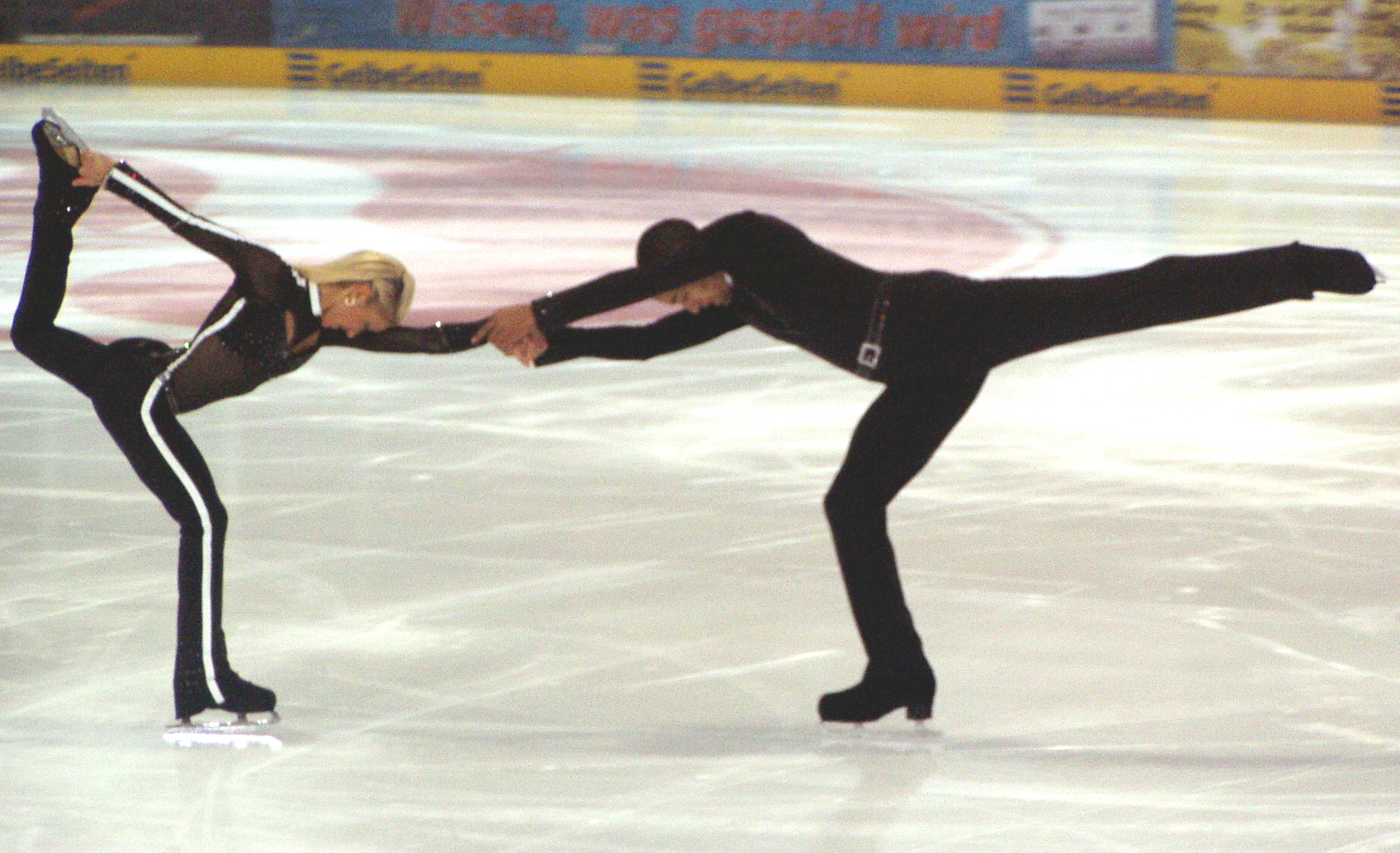
Catchfoot and arabesque
(Aliona Savchenko & Robin Szolkowy)

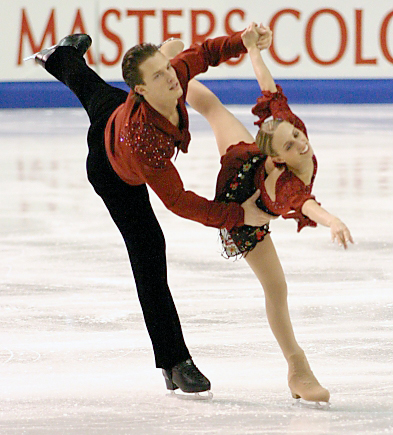
Pair arabesque spiral
(Valerie Marcoux & Craig Buntin)

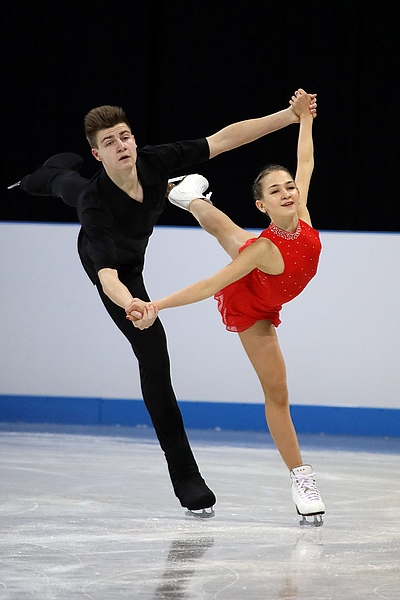
Pair arabesque spiral
(Sofiia Nesterova & Artem Darenskyi)

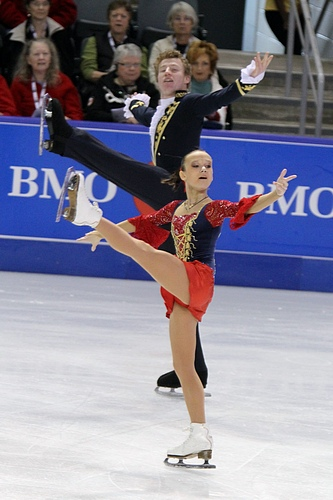
Pair fan spirals
(Lubov Iliushechkina & Nodari Maisuradze

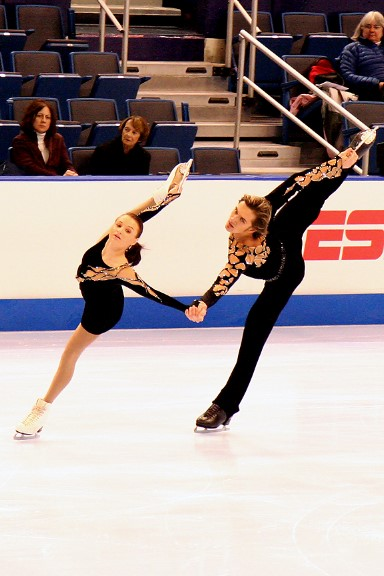
Pair Biellmann spirals
(Maria Mukhortova & Maxim Trankov)

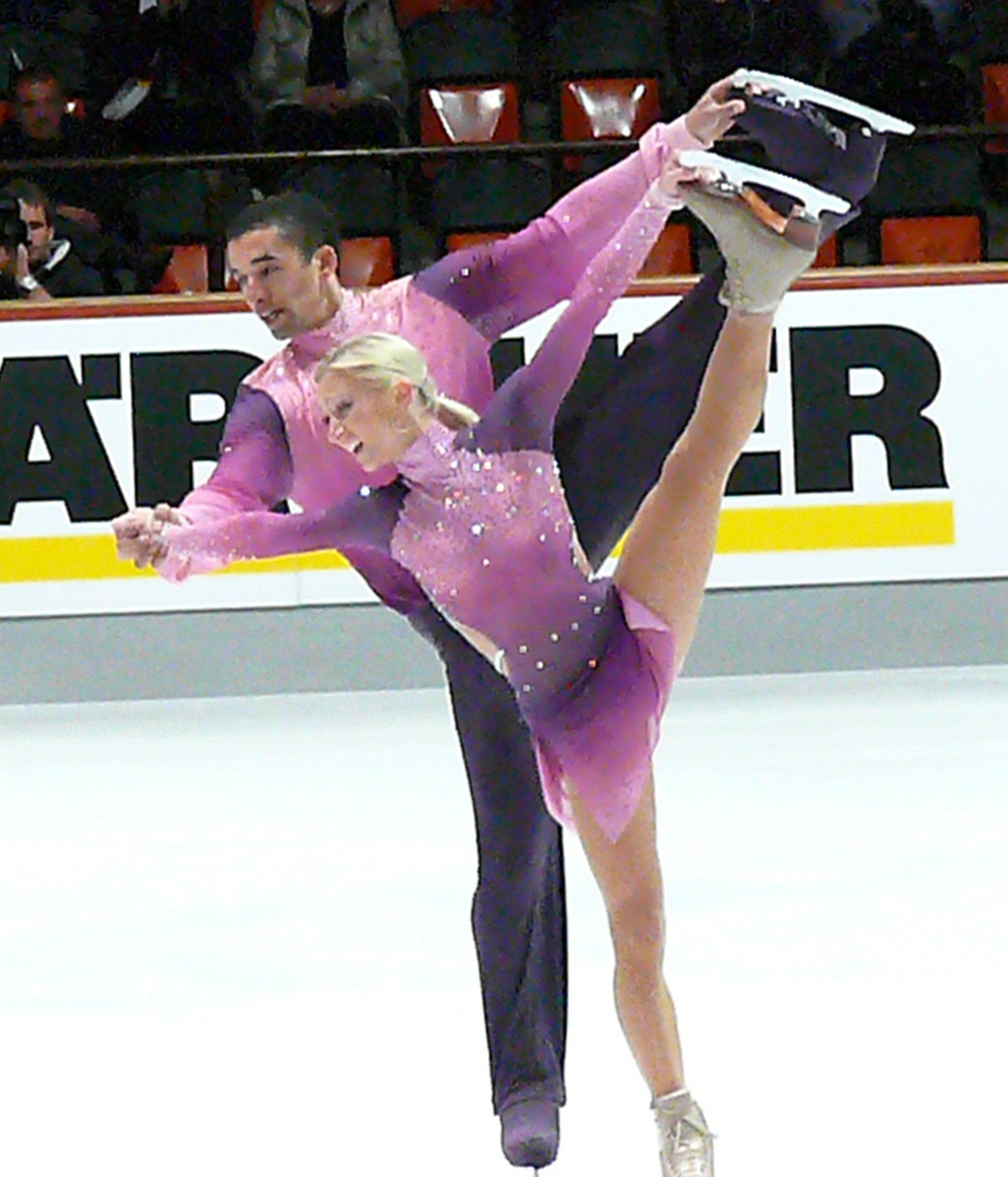
Pair Y-spirals
(Aliona Savchenko & Robin Szolkowy)

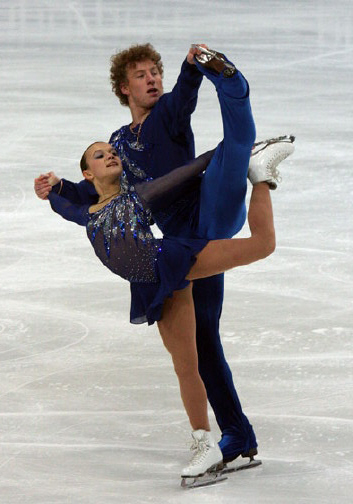
Y and catch-foot
(Lubov Iliushechkina & Nodari Maisuradze)

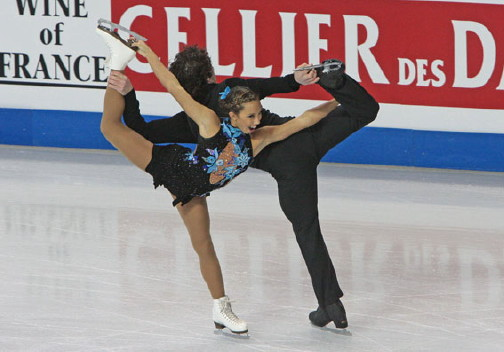
Pair catch-foot
(Keauna McLaughlin & Rockne Brubaker)

=== Synchronized skating ===
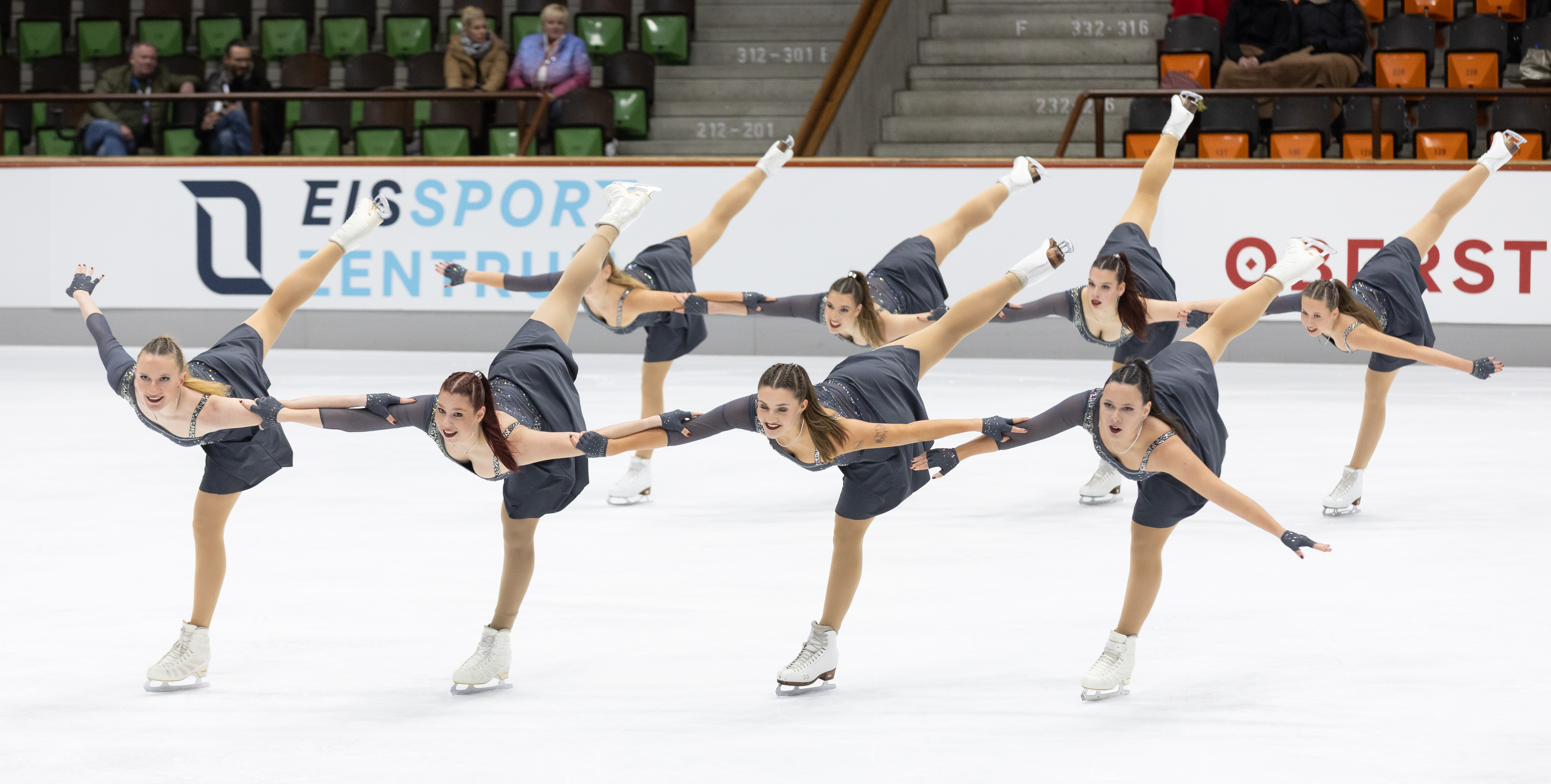
(Team United Angels)

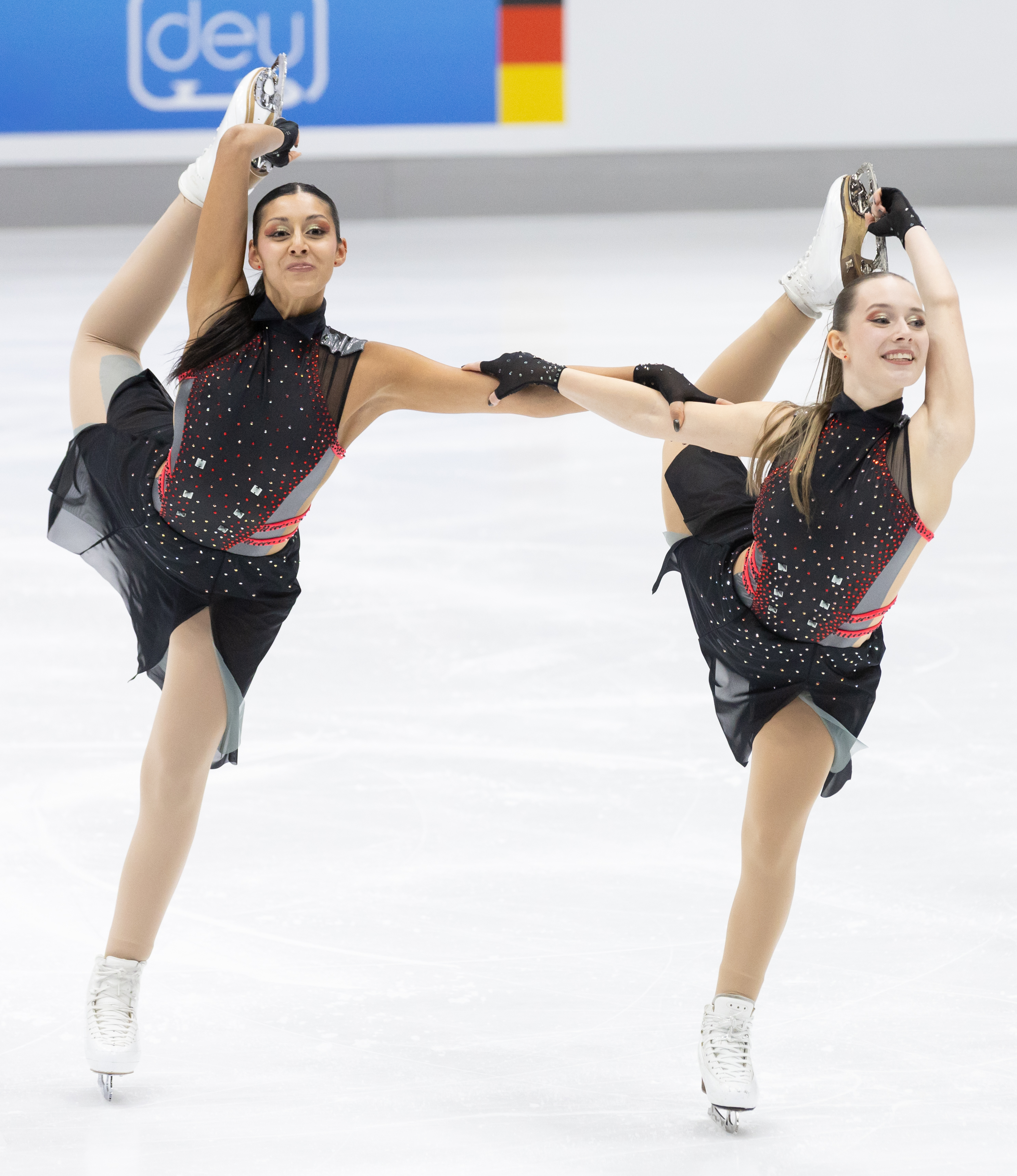
(Team Skating Graces Senior)

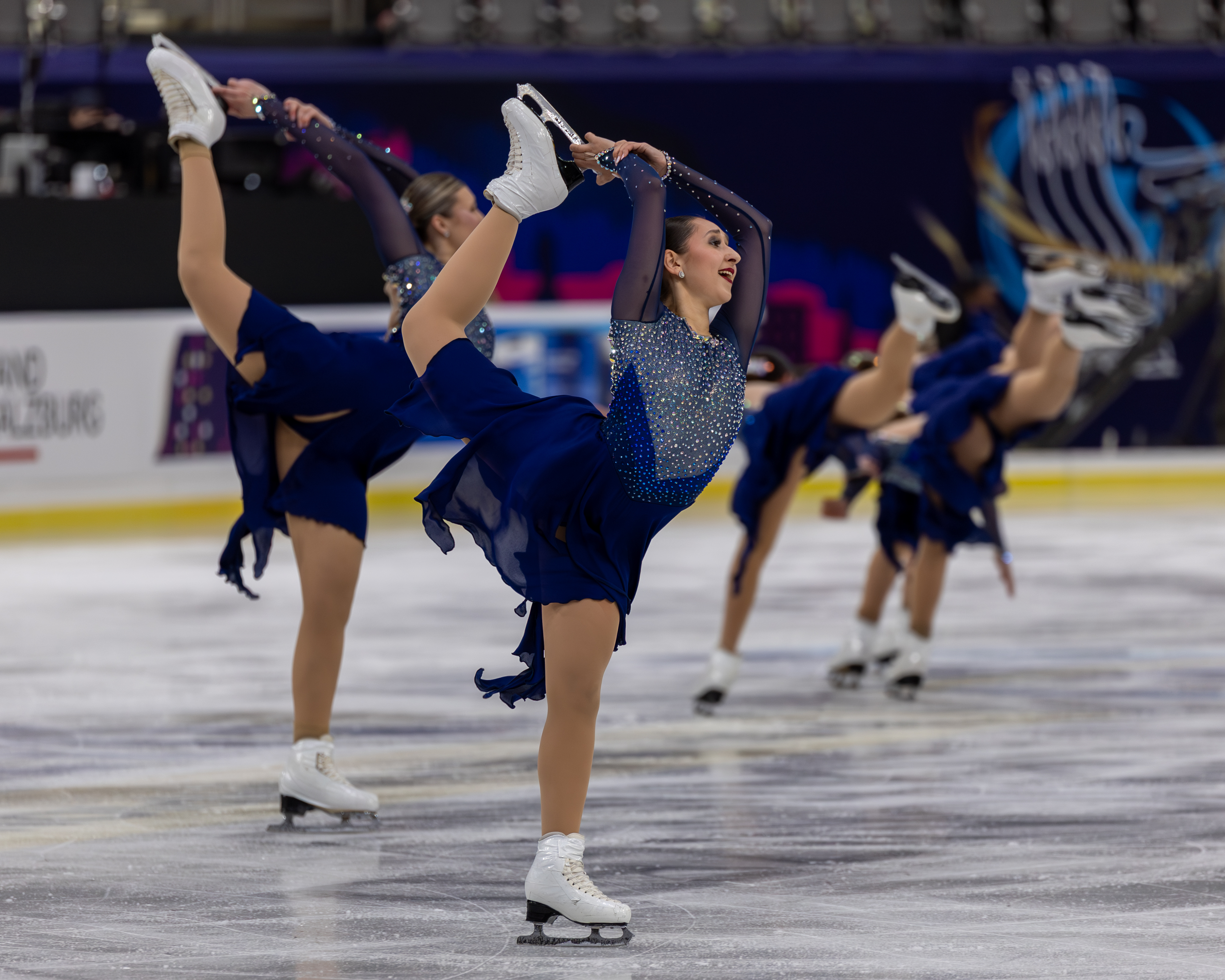
(Team Skyliners)
