= Hydroblading =

Figure skating move

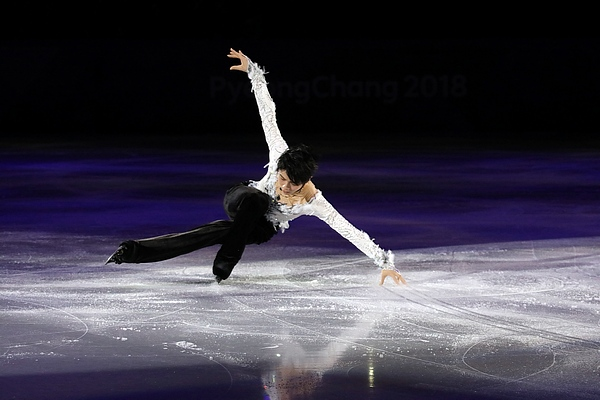
Yuzuru Hanyu performing an inside edge hydroblade

A hydroblade is a figure skating edge move or connecting step in which a skater glides on a deep edge with the body stretched in a very low position, almost touching the ice. Several variations in position are possible, but one commonly performed by singles skaters is on a back inside edge with the knee of the skating leg deeply bent, the free leg crossed behind and extended outside the circle, and the upper body leaning into the circle with two, one, or no hands skimming the ice.

== History ==
Although they did not invent the element, it was popularized in the early 1990s by the Canadian ice dance team of Shae-Lynn Bourne and Victor Kraatz; their coach Uschi Keszler was responsible for coining the name "hydroblade."

== Variations ==
- Classic - two hands, most commonly done on the right back inside edge for a right-handed person.
- One hand - picking up one hand off the ice, usually right for a right-handed person.
- No hands - neither hand is touching the ice, more difficult to get upper body low to the ice.
- Catch foot - a one-handed hydroblade where the hand not on the ice grasps the free foot.
- Pairs - seen as either a side-by-side element or one-person hydroblade with the other partner doing a different edge element.
- Open shoulder - where the upper body is facing upward, looks more like a shoot-the-duck glide.

== Gallery ==
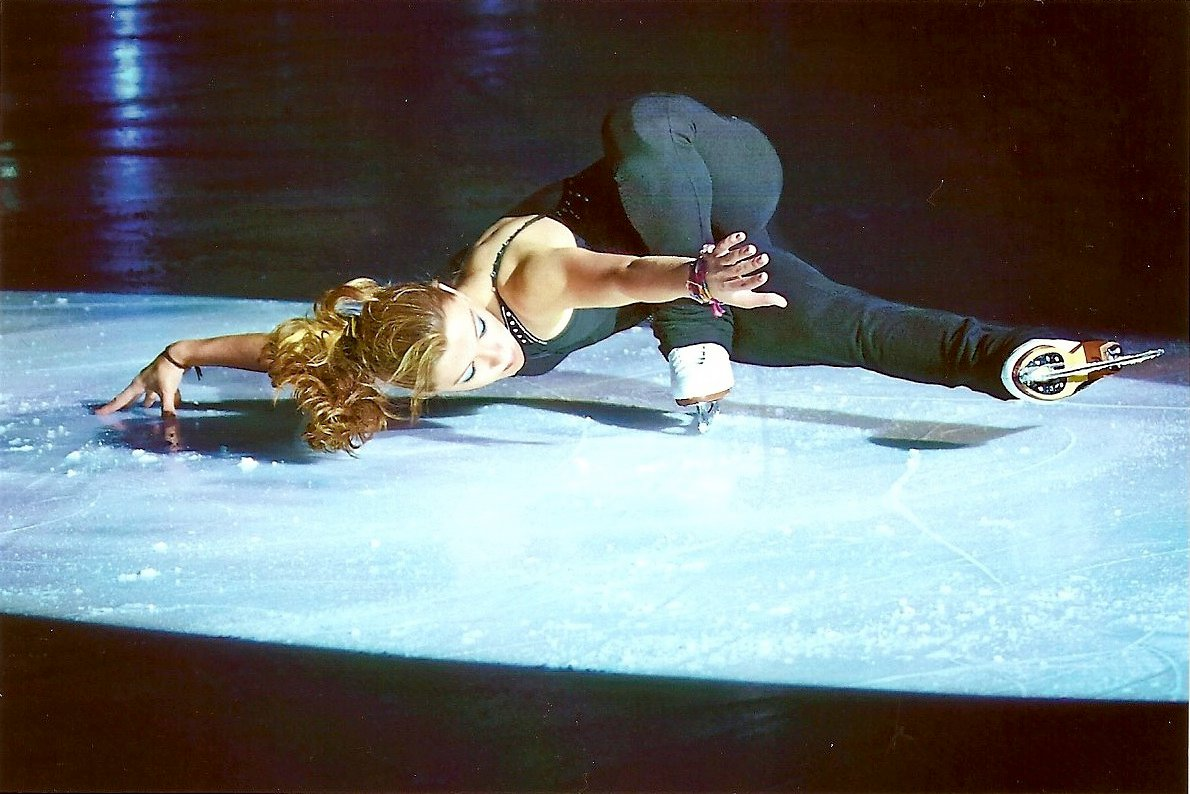
Dimitra Korri executes a one handed hydroblade

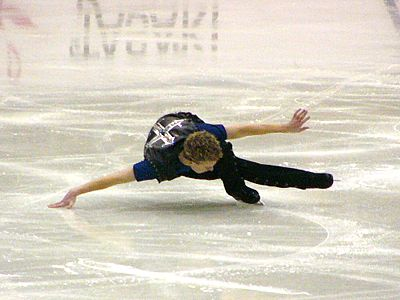
Timothy Goebel performs a hydroblade

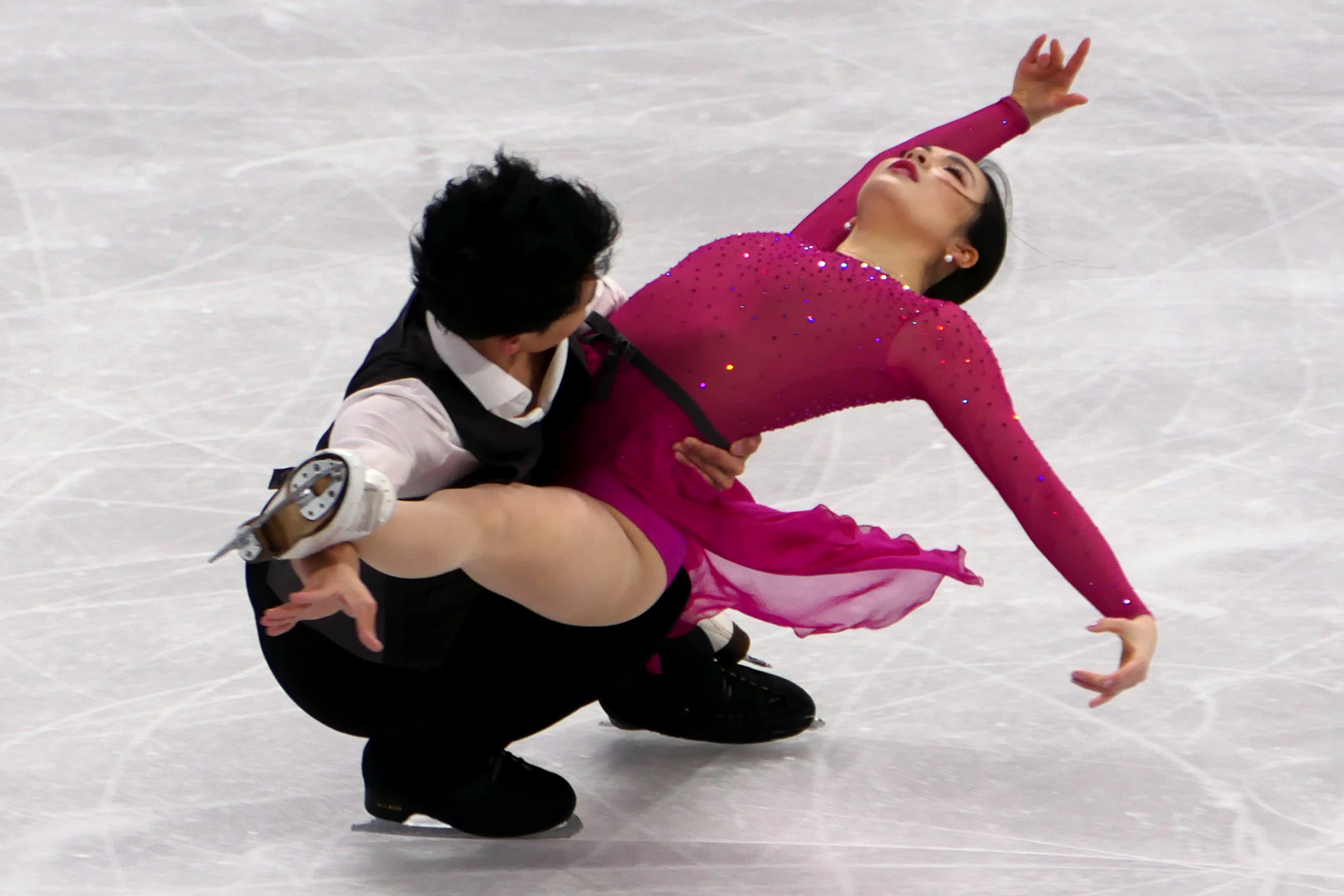
Hannah Lim & Ye Quan perform a hydroblade as an ice dancing element
