= Spread eagle (figure skating) =

Figure skating element

Figure skating element
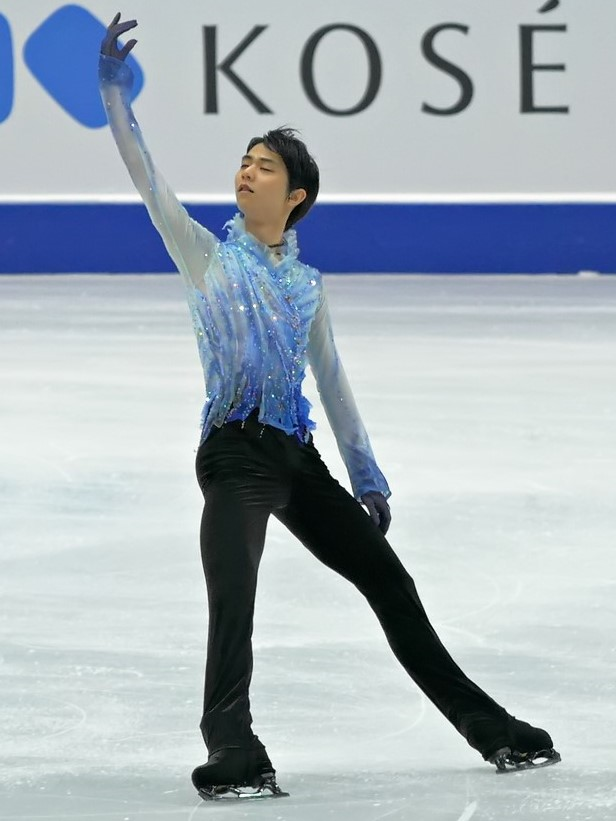
- Outside edge spread eagle performed by Yuzuru Hanyu
- Element name: Spread eagle
- Element type: Moves in the field

The spread eagle is one of the moves in the field in the sport of figure skating, in which a skater glides on both feet, the toes turned out to the sides, heels facing each other. It can be performed on either the inside or outside edges. It is commonly used as an entrance to jumps, adding to the difficulty level of that jump under the Code of Points. It is most commonly used as an entrance to an Axel jump.

== Gallery ==
=== Single ===
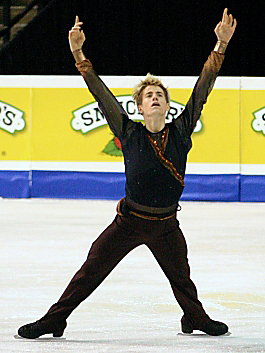
An inside spread eagle
front view
(Jeffrey Buttle)

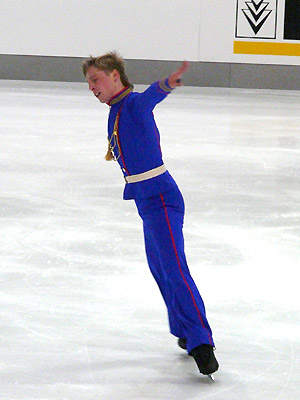
An inside spread eagle
side view
(Vitali Sazonets)

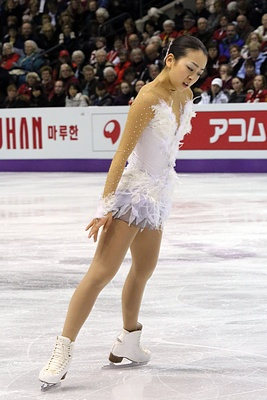
An inside spread eagle (Mao Asada)

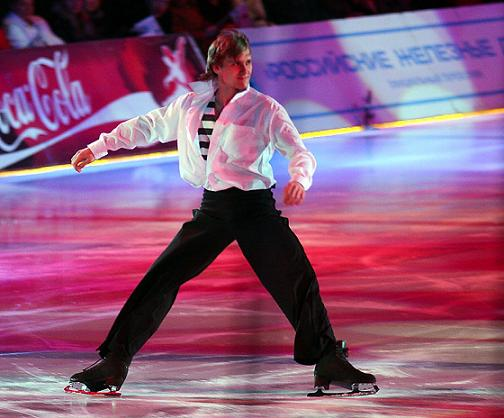
An outside spread eagle
(Andrei Griazev)

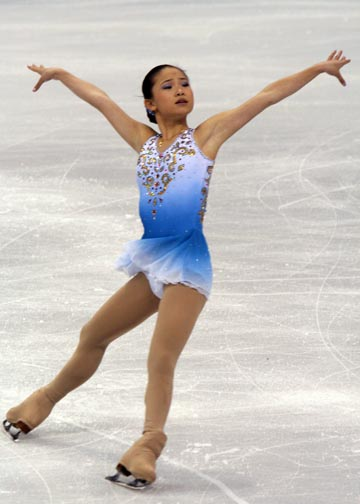
An outside spread eagle
(Caroline Zhang)

=== Pairs ===
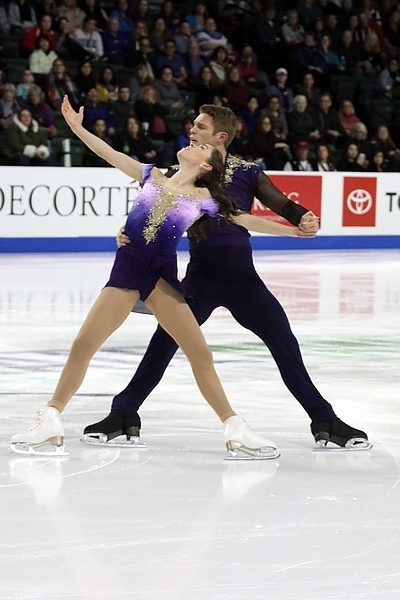
Outside edge spread eagle
(Evelyn Walsh & Trennt Michaud)

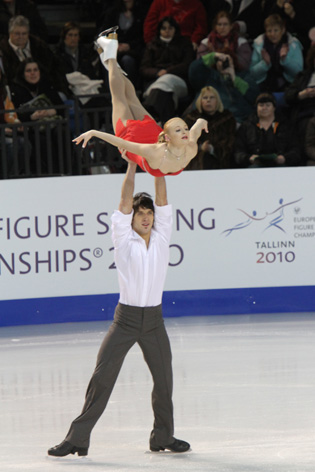
A carry lift with the man in a spread eagle
(Maria Mukhortova & Maxim Trankov)

=== Ice dancing ===
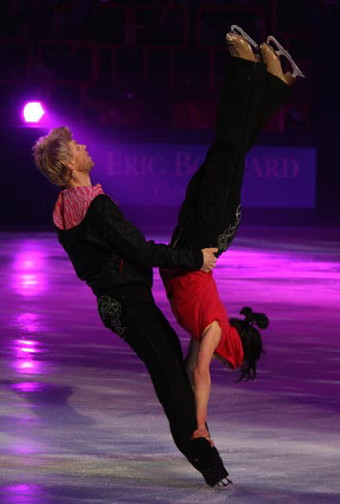
The male skater performs an outside spread eagle
(Isabelle Delobel & Olivier Schoenfelder)

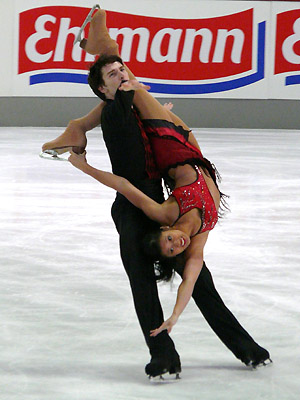
The male skater performs an outside spread eagle
(Lynn Kriengkrairut & Logan Giulietti-Schmitt)

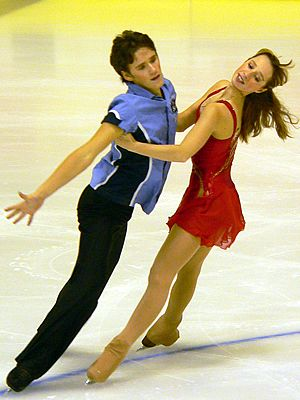
Inside and outside
(Kristina Gorshkova & Vitali Butikov)

=== Synchronized skating ===
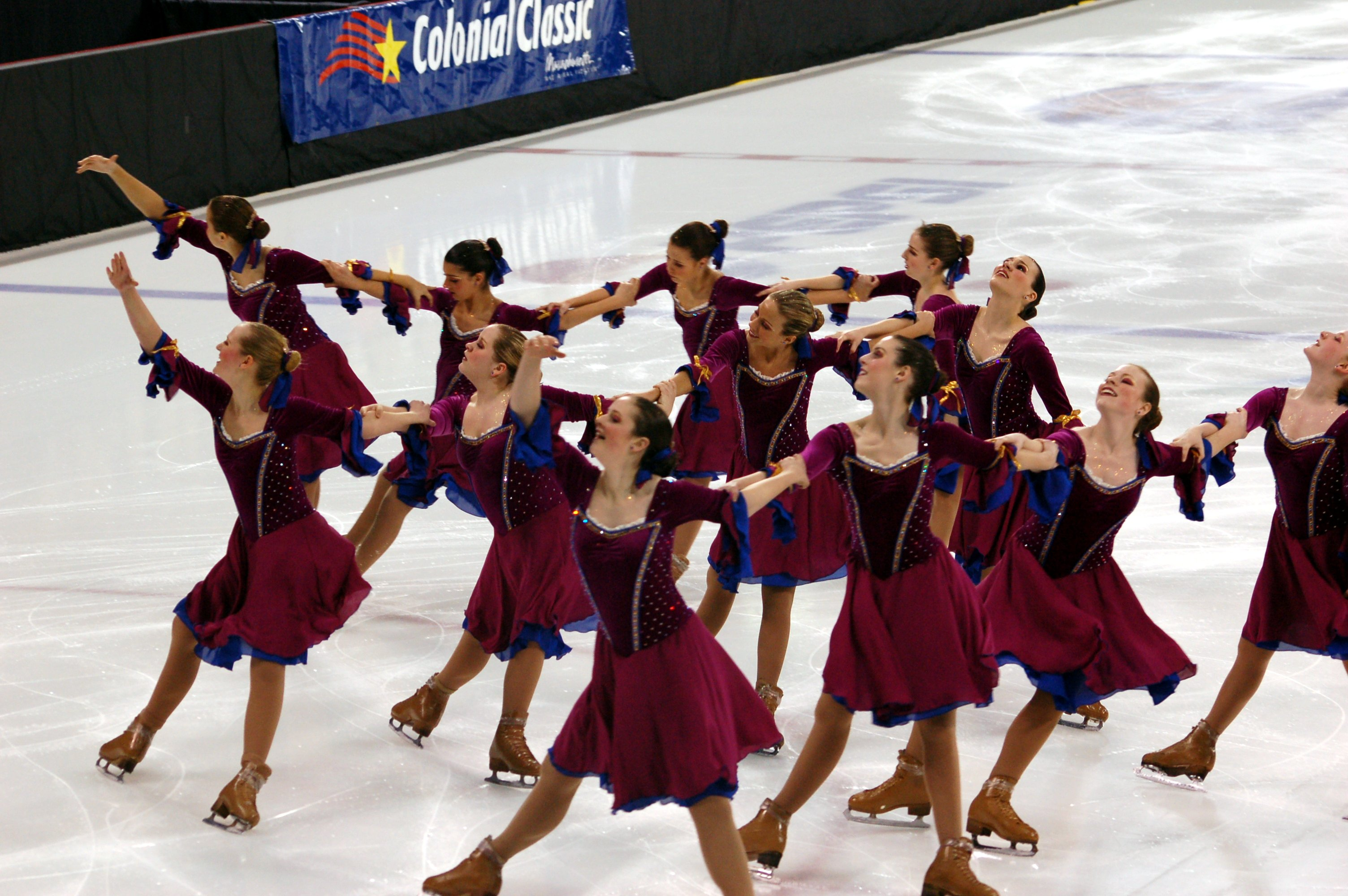
Outside spread eagles
(The Hockettes)
