= Friese doorloper =

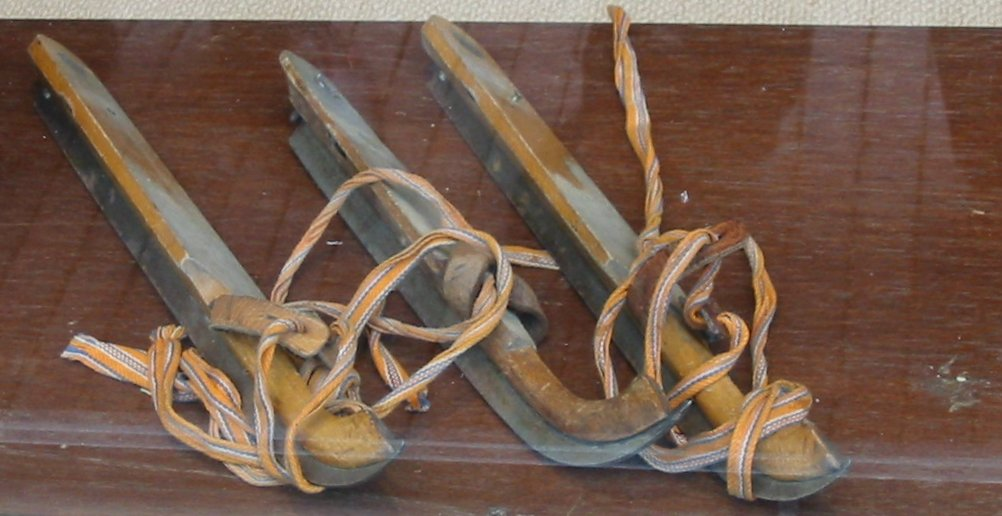
Old wooden Frisian skates, but not Friese doorlopers, tied under the shoe with ribbons

The Friese doorloper is a type of ice skate from the Netherlands. "Friese" means "Frisian" ("of Friesland"), and doorloper "to walk" or "run through", reflecting the design.

== Design ==
The design consists of a shaped length of wood, secured to a metal blade of the same length to form a single unit which can be bound to a boot or shoe. It was based on earlier designs of wooden skates, and differs in that the blade extends several inches behind the heel instead of ending under it. This reduces the risk of falling over backwards, particularly when stopping.

With the older designs, the wearer braked by raising their toes and digging their heels into the ice, with the new one breaking occurred by angling the blades.

== History ==
The Friese doorlopers design was first commercialised in 1875 by skating factories A. K. Hoekstra of Wergea and D. G. Minkema of Oosterlittens, both of Friesland, as a touring skate.

By the early years of the 20th Century, Friese doorlopers had completely replaced the older designs. The skates were popular among competition tour skaters, and were used by several winners of the unpredictably-held Elfstedentocht (the frost has to be hard enough for the whole of the roughly 200 km (120 mi) long course over canals and lakes to freeze). Friese doorlopers were also used for speed skating (kortebaanschaatsen - straight-line sprinting).

After 1945, the design was gradually replaced by ice skates with boots, in which the metal blade is directly attached to the sole of the boot. The last specialist manufacturer of Friese doorlopers closed in 1965. However, as of 2021 models which use plastics instead of wood are commercially available.

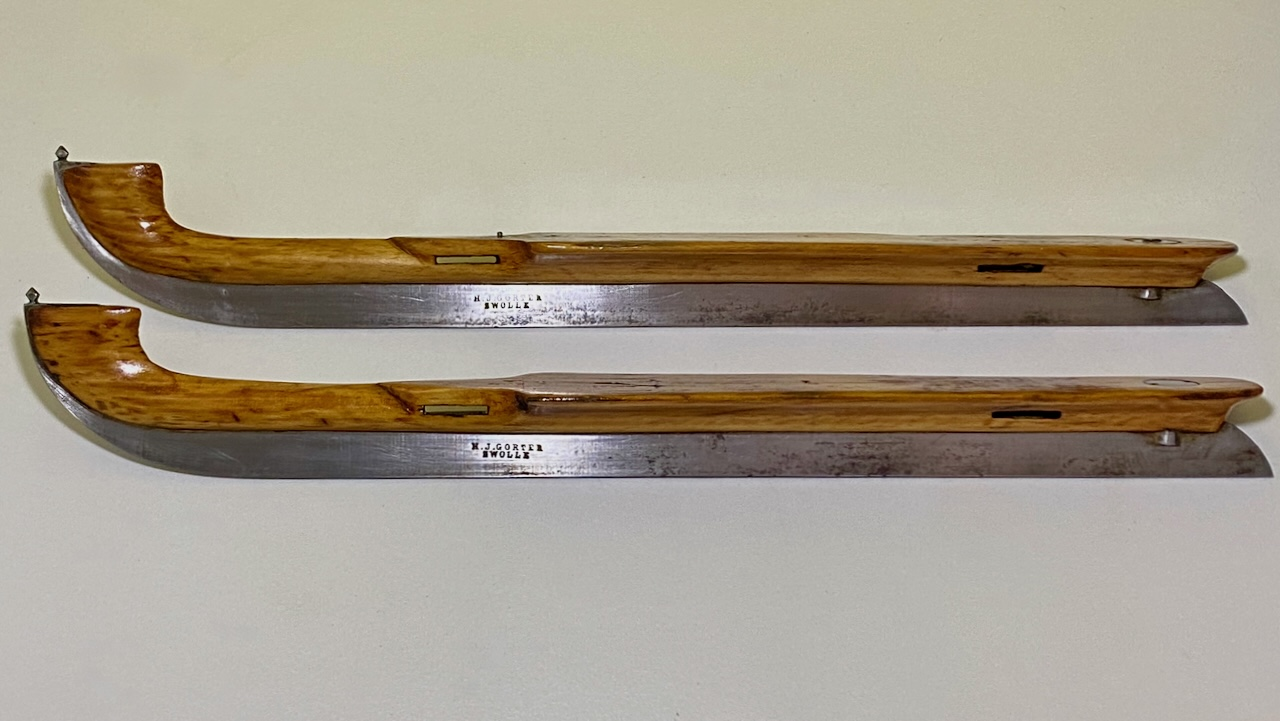
Friese doorlopers, fabricated in the ice skates factory of H.J. Gorter, Zwolle, ca. 1900.
