= Figure skate =

Type of ice skate used by figure skaters

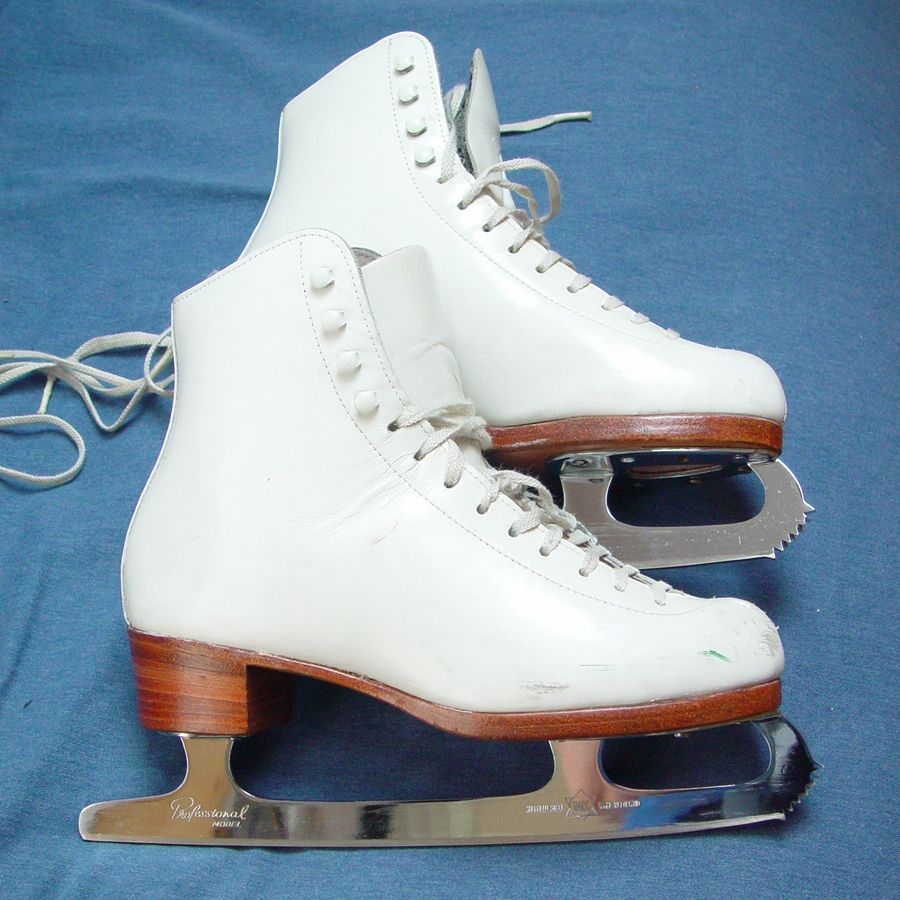
Figure skates have a toe pick at the front end.

Figure skates are a type of ice skate used by figure skaters. The skates consist of a boot and a blade that is attached with screws to the sole of the boot. Inexpensive sets for recreational skaters are available, but most figure skaters purchase boots and blades separately and have the blades mounted by a professional skate technician.

== History ==
The bladed skate was invented approximately 1800 BCE in Scandinavia. Skates were made from the leg bones of horses and cows. These bones were pierced with two holes and fitted to the skater's feet with leather straps. Skaters originally used ski-like poles to push themselves forward. These poles were abandoned after the invention of the bladed skate, which allowed skaters to push off with one skate and glide on the other. The use of bladed skates resulted in the development of stroking and gliding, figure skating's most basic elements, as well as the invention of the Dutch roll, the start of figures.

During the 13th century skaters transitioned to a new design featuring a piece of wood with a iron blade fastened underneath. while this modification provides greater control over movement, the iron blades increased friction and did not glide as smoothly as the previous materials. This design persisted into the 14th century, eventually replacing bone skates in regions such as the Netherlands.

During the 19th century, new forms of ice skates were developed to allow for even more control and safer gliding. Specific figure skates were created in response to the rise of figure skating's popularity in the 19th century, coinciding with the beginnings of formalized competitions such as the World Figure Skating Championships. The name "figure" skating arises from the compulsory portion of the competition, dropped in the 1990s, requiring skaters to trace out precise figures on the ice, including perfect figure 8 circles. Figure skates are now manufactured with extreme precision for use in competitive sports. Blades are specifically designed to include various types of toe picks that allow for skaters to reach new heights for jumps and spins, depending on the skater's level.

== Boots ==
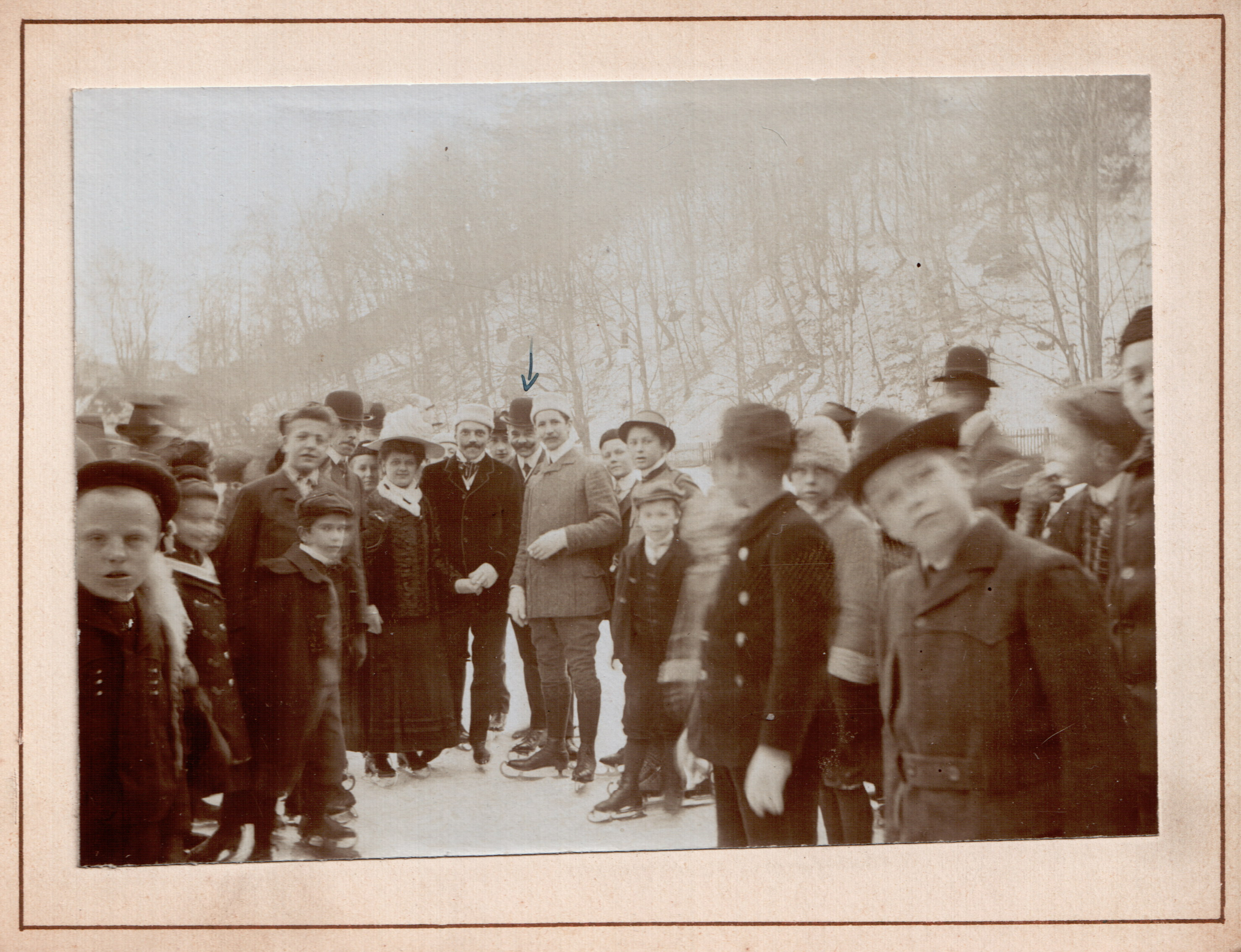
Ice skating in Graz in 1909

Figure skating boots are traditionally made by hand from many layers of leather. The design of figure skating boots changed significantly during the 20th century. Old photographs of skaters such as Sonja Henie from the 1920s and 1930s show them wearing thin, supple boots reaching to mid-calf. Modern skating boots, on the other hand, are extremely rigid to support the foot and ankle in jumps, and are cut much lower—just over ankle height—to allow the foot to flex. Because the stiffness of the boots makes good fit essential, many skaters either order custom boots or have their boots "bumped out" over pressure points by a skate technician.

In late 20th century, boots made of synthetic materials with heat-modifiable linings have become popular with many skaters because they combine strength with lighter weight than leather boots, and are easier to "break in." The latest development in boot technology is a boot that is hinged at the ankle to provide lateral support while allowing more flexibility. Boots used in ice dance are usually slightly lower in the back to allow for greater bend in the ankle. Some boots also come with a flexible elastic back.

The typical colors for boots are black for men and white for women, although other colors are available.

== Blades ==
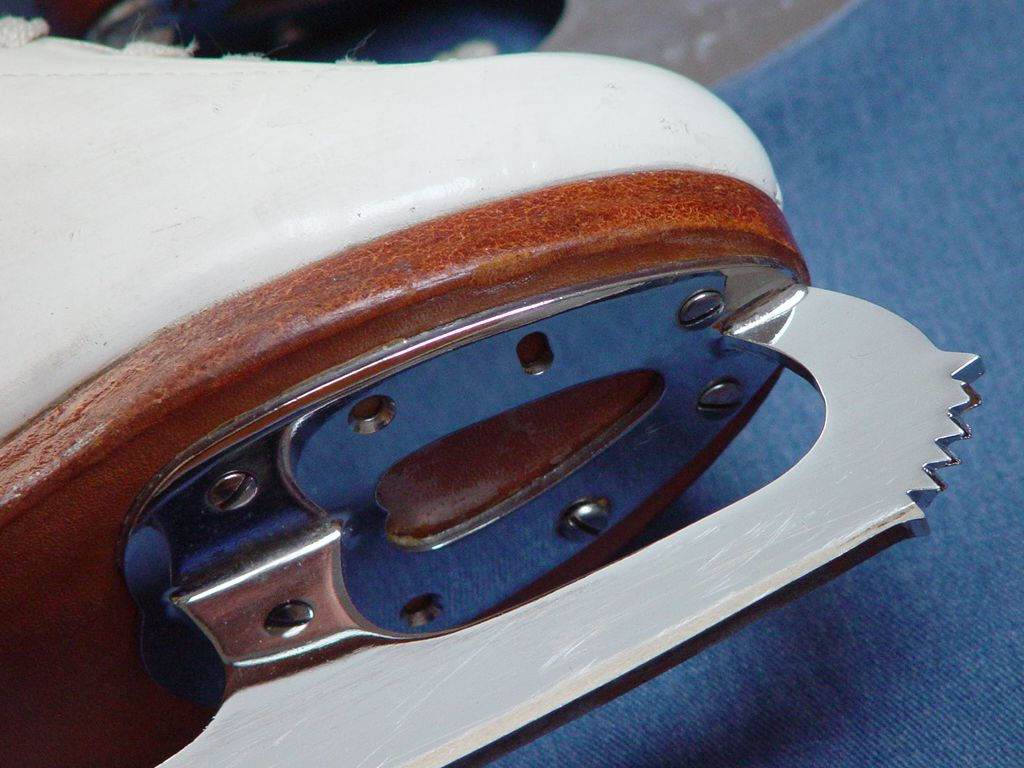
Close-up of a figure skating blade, showing the toe picks, the hollow (groove) on the bottom surface of the blade, and screw attachment to the boot.

Figure skates differ most visibly from hockey skates in having a set of large, jagged teeth called toe picks on the front of the blade. The toe picks are used primarily in jumping, footwork and spins and should not be used for stroking. Toe pick designs have become quite elaborate and sometimes include additional picks on the sides of the blade, often referred to as a k-pick.

The skate blades are typically made of tempered carbon steel, coated with a high-quality chrome. Lightweight aluminum and stainless steel blades are becoming more popular with skaters. Blades are about 5 mm (3/16 in) thick and may have a slightly tapered cross-section. There are different blades for different levels of skaters which often correspond to a skater's age, size and skill level. Blades for advanced skaters often have larger toe picks and different curves than blades for beginner, intermediate and recreational levels.

When viewed from the side, the blade of a figure skate is not flat, but curved slightly, forming an arc of a circle with a radius of 180–220 cm (70–85 in). This curvature is referred to as the rocker of the blade. The sweet spot of the blade is below the ball of the foot. This spot is usually located near the stanchion of the blade, and is the part of the blade where all spins are spun on.

The blade is also hollow ground; a groove on the bottom of the blade that creates two distinct edges, inside and outside. In figure skating it is always desirable to skate on only one edge of the blade, never on both at the same time (which is referred to as a flat). The apparently effortless power and glide across the ice exhibited by elite figure skaters fundamentally derives from efficient use of the edges to generate speed.

Ice dancers' and synchronized skaters' blades are about an inch shorter in the rear than those used by skaters in other disciplines, to accommodate the intricate footwork and close partnering in dance. They also possess a smaller pick near the bottom to allow for better edge-work and less focus on jumping.

Skating, when the "physics of steel blades traveling across ice" is exploited, provides for human movement impossible in other media. For example, the minimal friction required between the narrow steel blade and the ice that melts beneath it allows a skater to glide across an ice rink. As a result of this lack of friction, the skater's body is "simultaneously motionless with respect to itself and in motion with respect to its surroundings and to a fixed visual point of view". The lack of friction also allows a skater to spin continuously in place faster and for a longer time than on any other media and surface by allowing for both linear and sustained rotational motion, which presents "a constantly changing three-dimensional picture to a fixed observer" of the skater, who does this by either moving their body parts around the spinning center or by holding a single position. The skater can also jump higher and further, as well as stay in the air longer, than with any other media and surface. As writer Ellyn Kestnbaum states, "The use of special dance floors and shoes or equipment and media such as bodies of water, skis, trapezes and trampolines can also enable people to achieve many of these effects, but none allows for combining them with quite the fluidity of ice skating". Figure skating blades used in competition, according to the International Skating Union (ISU), the organization that oversees the sport, must be sharpened to "produce a flat to concave cross section without change to the width of the blade as measured between the two edges ", although a slight narrowing or tapering of the blade's cross section is allowed.

=== Blade types ===
Various specialty blade types exist, including:

- Tapered figure skating blades have a design which causes them to be thicker at the front near the toe picks and thinner at the tail of the blade; therefore, the edges are not parallel.
- Side-honed figure skating blades have a concave design which causes them to be thicker at the stanchions and the edge stripe and thinner in between. They are easily recognizable because they cause reflections to be inverted.
- Parabolic figure skating blades were first introduced by HD Sports in order to employ new scientific developments in the creation of figure skating blades. The middle section of parabolic blades is thinner than that of normal blades, while both ends are typically wider than those of regular blades. This translates into less steel and a lighter blade overall. Their design is meant to improve skaters' blade stability, footwork, and edges.

=== Toe Pick ===
The bottom tooth of the toe pick is called the drag pick, while the top teeth are called the master picks. The drag pick is the last to leave the ice during a jump takeoff and first to touch down upon landing. It also slightly touches the ice on most spins. On toe jumps, the master picks dig into the ice to provide a stable takeoff. On all landings, the picks act as a critical pivot point to control the impact and position the exit. Toe picks are also used for pivots and jump-spins such as a flying camel and flying sit spin utilize the toe pick to land the jump portion before pivoting into the proper spin rocker edge.

Figure skating blades feature two primary toe pick designs: cross-cut picks do not dig into the ice as deep into the ice, but their interlocking pattern prevents the blade from sliding. This design is typically used by beginner and intermediate skaters. Conversely, straight-cut toe picks allow a skater to quickly dig deep into the ice to achieve greater height on jumps, though they carry a higher risk of losing momentum due to slippage. Consequently, straight-cut picks are generally used by advanced skaters who are confidant on their jumps.

=== Blade sharpness ===
Blades for figure skates require precise sharpening to maintain control, and are typically sold unsharpened, They are customized by the shop to fit the skater's skill level and discipline. A deeply sharpened "V" cut on the blade should be reserved for professional figure skaters, as it requires greater physical strength to manage, as the blade can catch the ice abruptly and cause injuries like joint sprains. Figure skating blades that are too sharp can also be cause for concern, as the skater may find their feet slipping out to the side, making falls and sprains much more likely. Skates are sharpened by a grindstone, and the deeper the cut, the quicker the user can stop or turn on the ice. Professional skaters have their skates sharpened to the deepest possible cut in order to pull off complicated spins, jumps, and footwork. The ability to stop on a dime is important in events such as the Grand Prix, where even a single point deducted can cost the competitor the lead. If a competitor is in the unfortunate position of finding their blades to be too dull to support themselves adequately after a jump combination, they could touch down on the ice or fall, which can ruin an otherwise point-grabbing sequence.

== Skate guards ==
Skate guards are a cover for the blades of skates. These guards act as a cover to protect the blades from wear and tear, or to keep the blades from rusting over. Typically, blades are composed of a stainless steel frame, but even this durable material is prone to rust if left covered in moisture, such as the water and ice produced by a long day marking up the rink. The best type of skate guard for this scenario is a terry cloth guard, called "soakers," which absorb any leftover moisture and prevents the appearance of rust on the blades. Another common type of skate guard are made of hard plastic, and they are used by competitors and skaters when walking around in skates when off the ice. These durable covers delay the dulling of the blades by providing a protective barrier between the blade and the ground. Oftentimes, skate guards can be seen being used by competitors after their performances while they wait for their scores to be announced at the kiss and cry area. Since scores are presented soon after the performance has ended, many skaters do not have time to remove the tight laces of their skates before their placement is announced. Skate guards are also a method of personalizing one's skates, and as such, there is a decent market within the skating community for personalized and customized skate guards. Since the purpose of the guards is to protect the blades, guards can be decorated with any number of markings or materials, even being bedazzled or gold plated if the owner desires.
