= Apetor =

Norwegian YouTuber (1964–2021)

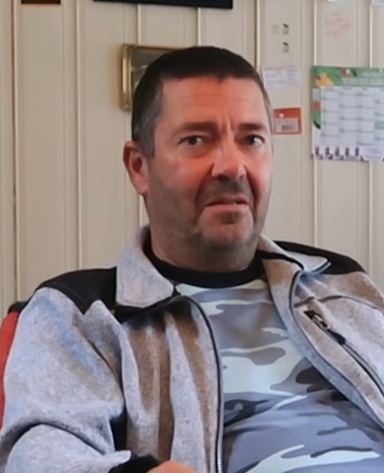
- Apetor in 2019
- Born: Tor Rathje Eckhoff; 22 November 1964; Kristiansund, Norway
- Died: 27 November 2021 (aged 57); Oslo, Norway
- Occupations: YouTuber; industrial worker
- Partner: Tove Skjerven
- Children: 1

YouTube information
- Channel: apetor
- Years active: 2006–2021
- Subscribers: 1.4 million
- Views: 461 million
- Last updated: 2 July 2026

Tor Rathje Eckhoff (22 November 1964 – 27 November 2021), also known as Apetor (Norwegian pronunciation: [ˈɑ̂ːpəˌtuːɾ]), was a Norwegian YouTuber known primarily for his videos where he drank vodka while performing activities on frozen waters, like ice skating, swimming in ice holes and diving. He died in 2021 after he fell through the ice of a lake west of Kongsberg, Norway, while recording a video. At the time of his death, he worked at a paint factory in Sandefjord Municipality run by the chemicals company Jotun.

His YouTube career lasted from 2006 until his death in 2021, though his channel first started gaining popularity in 2011. His videos, in which he remained mostly silent, were popular worldwide, especially in Poland. The ones he recorded during the winter were his most well-known, though also being controversial in nature due to their perceived danger—drinking alcohol before swimming near-naked in below-freezing temperatures—but some also characterised them as artistic for their presentation and content. Despite his success, he did not make a living out of his videos, creating them primarily for his own enjoyment.

== Personal life ==
Tor Rathje Eckhoff was born in Kristiansund, Norway, on 22 November 1964 to professor Johan Arent Rathje Eckhoff and secretary Kari Elisabeth Anderssen. He was the second of three brothers, Jan and Ulf. He moved to Sandefjord at the age of 6. Eckhoff studied history, philosophy, and nordic literature at the University of Bergen, graduating in 1993 with a cand.mag. (Note: Eckhoff, Tor. "Tor Eckhoff". LinkedIn.) On 17 December 1993, he had a child with his partner, Tove Skjerven, whom he met while studying in Bergen. His mother died in 1994, and his father in 2008; his brother Ulf died of cancer in October 2021.

Eckhoff and Skjerven moved to Sandefjord after living in Bergen for some years. They first lived in a cabin before moving into a house in the city. After a while, Eckhoff grew tired and irritable from his traditional life and moved out into a cabin again. They lived separately after this, but still retained a relationship. Eckhoff worked at a paint factory in Sandefjord, which was run by the chemicals company Jotun. This would remain his long-term place of employment from 2008 until his death in 2021.

Eckhoff had an interest in evolutionary biology, being fascinated with the close genetic relationship between humans and apes. He had an affinity for the outdoors, often going camping during the Summer, along with mountain climbing, especially around Jotunheimen. He enjoyed running and outdoor bathing, and had an interest in photography; his partner estimated that he took tens of thousands of pictures. One of his pictures at Yxney in Sandefjord was included in the 1994 photo-book Uniquely Norway (Norwegian: Jeg så, jeg så Norge). He was fond of the Volvo 240 and 142 series of cars, owning a 1968 model of the latter. Despite the frequent appearance of winter swimming in his videos, he rarely did it in his spare time, nor did he drink alcohol often outside of his videos.

In June 2013, Eckhoff reported that he had been robbed of his recording and camping equipment after he left them at a quay to moor his boat. He suspected two men piloting a large motorboat of the theft, (Note: The vessel he described was a skjærgårdsjeep, a small motor boat used in Norway.) noting that their boat had run full throttle into the port when he was gone. He reported the incident to the police, though he did not notice the brand of the boat. A few days later, he wrote on Facebook that his belongings had been returned, and that they had been taken unintentionally by someone from Kongsberg. (Note: Eckhoff, Tor (12 June 2013). "My Stuff Is Back!!!". Facebook.)

In his 20s, Eckhoff was diagnosed with ulcerative colitis, but chose not to get operated because he believed the result would be too restrictive for his lifestyle. He kept the disease secret from his friends. In March 2018, Eckhoff told his family that he had been diagnosed with cancer; he underwent surgery later in June. In November, Eckhoff uploaded a video to YouTube divulging his diagnosis of colorectal cancer. He clarified in the video that it was not due to lifestyle choices, but from chronic inflammatory bowel disease. After the surgery, he had to use a colostomy bag. He was focused on enjoying the small things in life through his videos, a feeling reinforced by his survival from cancer.

== YouTube career ==
Eckhoff ice skating on a frozen lake, propelling himself forward using a chainsaw, an example of the type of stunts he became most well-known for

Eckhoff joined YouTube on 10 October 2006 and posted his first video a day later. This happened the same year he moved out into his cabin to escape family life. The moniker he used online, Apetor, consisting of the word ape (Note: The word is the same in both English and Norwegian.) and his given name Tor, stemmed from his aforementioned interest in the close relationship between humans and apes. He used his channel to document his trips, sharing footage of wildlife and scenic views, both domestically and abroad. (Note: International destinations where he has made videos include Warsaw and New York City.) He used his boat to showcase the archipelagos around Sandefjord during both the winter and summer.

Eckhoff initially filmed his videos with a compact camera before upgrading to a higher quality video camera in 2009. He also started editing his videos in an effort to get more views. He stated that other people were not present during the filming of his videos, despite people being worried for his safety. The software he used to edit his videos was the free Apple-developed application iMovie. He created the majority of his videos in his cabin in Kodal.

His first breakthrough video, uploaded in 2011, was "On Thin Sea Ice 2", (Note: The video was originally titled "På tynn sjøis 2 (on thin sea ice), Sandefjord in Norway". (Note: An archive of the original YouTube video can be located here: "On Thin Sea Ice 2". YouTube. 2 February 2011. Archived from the original on 9 February 2011.)) acquiring over one million views in the span of a week. It featured him ice skating, drinking vodka, diving through sea ice, and making seal-like sounds with his mouth. For parts of it he had other people present acting as helpers, but was completely alone when he went under the ice. Despite claims that he had not done extreme sport or winter swimming before the video, he had filmed himself practicing falling through frozen waters safely before. Clips from the video were featured without his permission in the video compilation "People Are Awesome 2011", which had earned 4.5 million views by February 2012, and 30 million by August. Though Eckhoff commented on the illegality of publishing it without his permission, he did not mind due to the brevity of the clips, and said that he considered his inclusion "an honour". "On Thin Sea Ice 2" was featured at the 37th annual Banff Mountain Film Festival in 2013 under the tagline "Slide away with simple pleasures: skating, bathing, and a little vodka!" Out of the 380 films entered, it was one of 28 to be screened at the festival, which took place in 285 locations in 30 countries, for example at the Arlington Theatre in California, and the Queenstown Memorial Centre in Queenstown, New Zealand.

Following the strong positive reactions to "On Thin Sea Ice 2", he was encouraged to upload more videos like it. He established the business Apetor Film in March 2011 to facilitate the "production of film, video, and television programmes." (Note: He registered the business on 9 March 2011 at the Brønnøysund Register Centre, but deregistered under a month later on 7 April.) The follow-up, "On Thin Sea Ice 3", featured him supposedly swimming to a ferry to buy alcohol in the middle of winter. In the fourth "On Thin Ice" video, he continued by cutting a hole in the ice with a chainsaw before dunking his head in it and diving into it, in addition to cutting out an ice doughnut and wearing it around his neck. He would end up uploading a total of thirteen videos in the "On Thin Ice" series, (Note: Three titled "On Thin Sea Ice", and ten titled "On Thin Ice") many of which gaining millions of views, with "On Thin Ice 4", for instance, earning 351,000 views in a single day after appearing on the front page of Reddit in 2013, at that point having reached 4 million views in under three years.

The most popular video on his channel was "The First Snow 4", acquiring over 94 million views before his death; The video has over 100 million views as of 2022. Part of the annual "First Snow" videos started in 2014, it featured him submerging himself in a frozen bathtub while drinking vodka. In a similar video, "A day in November", (Note: Later changed to "A Day in November 2014"; compare this 2014 archive to one from 2019.) uploaded in 2014 after a year long break, he also got into an icy bath, earning 610,000 views in 5 days. Another popular series on his channel was the Christmas videos, where he performed various stunts of similar calibre to his "On Thin Ice" series, like skating across ice using a chainsaw. His vodka of choice, Vikingfjord, made frequent appearances on his channel, though he claimed that he had no connection to the brand, and that he had never been in touch with the company that produces it. (Note: He adds that advertising alcohol is illegal in Norway, specifically above 2.5 percent alcohol by volume.)

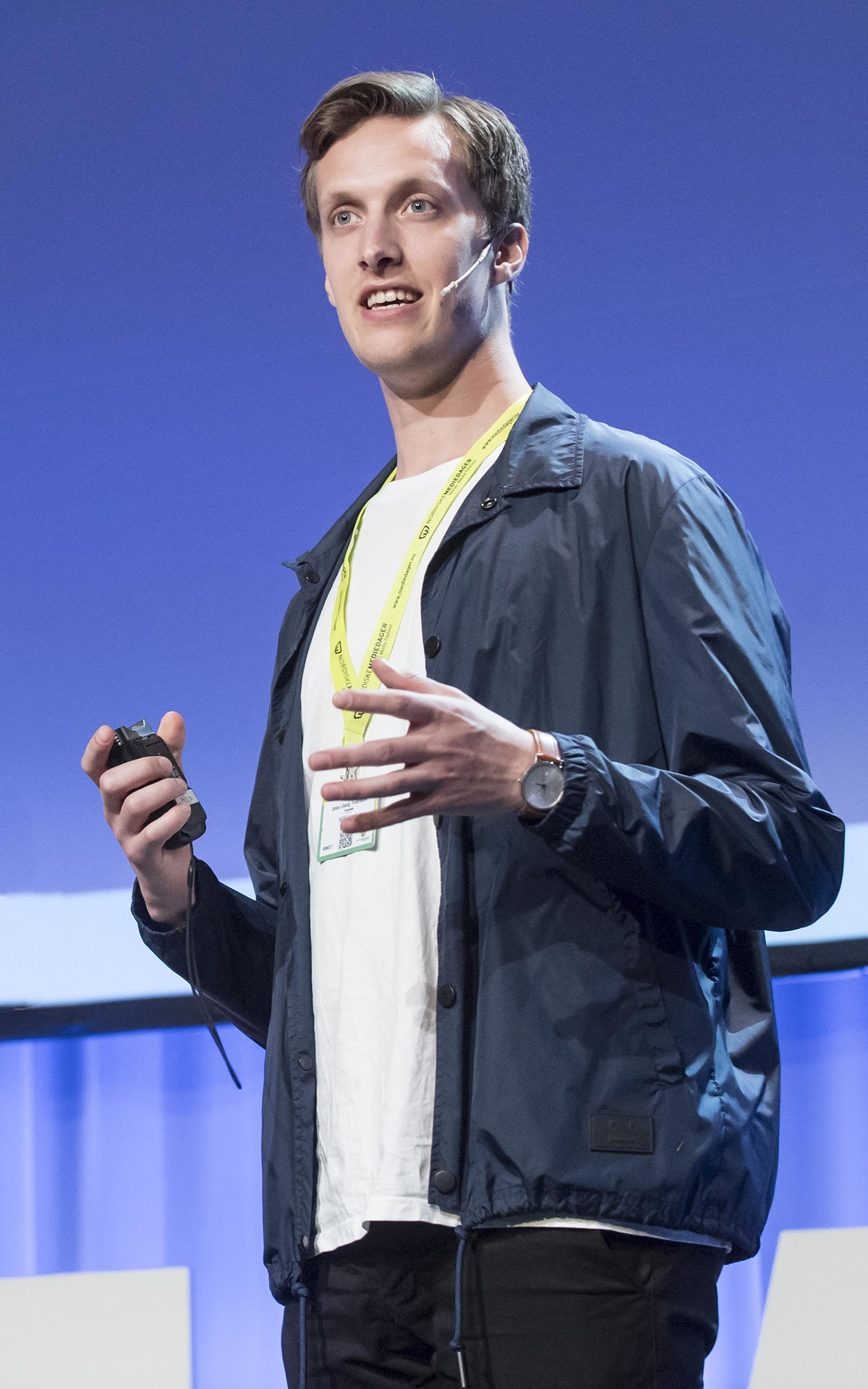
Jonas Lihaug Fredriksen collaborated with Eckhoff in filming a video for Norwegian broadcasting company NRK

He collaborated with Jonas Lihaug Fredriksen of the Norwegian state-sponsored entertainment YouTube channel NRK 4ETG in late 2019, when they went swimming together in winter conditions. In a 2021 interview, Fredriksen attributed much of Eckhoff's international success to him not speaking often in his content beside making strange noises, and to what Fredriksen deemed to be the absurdist humour present in his videos. NRK journalist Sigurd Øygarden Flæten attributed part of his success to his interactions with fans; Eckhoff made over 30,000 comments in reply to them. Despite this success, Eckhoff remained humble, and did not make a living off his videos, earning a few hundred dollars a month in 2015. He expressed that he only made videos for fun, and that he had not been trying to impart any messages with them. His video production was, by his own words, a continuation of his interest in photography, which he developed in the 1980s.

== Reception ==
Eckhoff's videos were popular internationally, with the largest sections of his viewership being from European countries like Poland (Note: In 2016, 70 to 80 percent of views came from Poland.) and Russia, but also in the United States; in 2016, Eckhoff recounted the story of how two Polish fans arrived at his home in the rural village of Kodal, where they bathed in a bathtub featured on his channel after enquiring about it. He posited that his popularity in Poland in particular was due to their cultural tendencies of vodka-drinking and winter swimming. He became the first Norwegian YouTuber over the age of 50 to acquire one million subscribers, which alongside his subscriber count of 1.2 million by the time of his death, made him one of the most popular YouTubers in Norway. In spite of his international success, only 1.5 percent of his views came from his own country.

Clips of his videos have appeared on major television channels in Norway and internationally, including on the Norwegian news channel TV 2, on the American network G4, and on the American news network CBS, all in 2011, in addition to an appearance on the Australian breakfast show programme Sunrise in 2016. On a 2012 episode of the Norwegian entertainment programme Norge Rundt, he talked about several TV stations getting into contact with him, notably the British TV show Rude Tube, alongside several other unspecified American, French and Japanese ones.

Eckhoff has remarked on the ability of his content to affect the global perception of Norway: "[H]ere the tourism industry is, working to bring tourists here, and then I arrive tearing the whole thing down. It's become a bit like "polar bears in the streets" (Note: A stereotype of Norway.) because of it all. Do they really believe all Norwegians do these kinds of things?" (Note: Original Norwegian quote: "[H]er jobber reiselivsbransjen med å få turister til å komme hit, og så kommer jeg og river ned hele greia. Men det har blitt litt sånn "isbjørn i gatene" over det hele. Tror de virkelig alle nordmenn gjør sånn her?") Others have corroborated these thoughts, like Kåre Gåsholt of Sandefjords Blad, referring to him as the likely biggest private disseminator of nature in Norway. Tourism in Sandefjord, the town he lived in, experienced a surge due to his channel. In 2018, for example, a group of 16 tourists arrived from Szczecin, Poland, to swim in the waters, with Eckhoff showing up to greet them. Many of the tourists also made recurrent visits to the town.

The unique content featured in Eckhoff's videos has been labelled artistic, with Ivar Steen-Johnsen of Nordic Screens noting his ability to "strike a nerve that crosses borders" with his videos. He continued that Eckhoff's humour would "live long across the entire world". Writing on his silent, yet humorous demeanor, Rafał Krause of Newonce compared him to Mr. Bean, adding further that his dynamic editing, with frequent changes of perspective, was akin to avant-garde cinema.

=== Danger ===
For all their popularity, his stunts had not been without criticism, with some comparing them to Russian roulette. Analysts on Discovery Channel, for example, stated that his alcohol intake mixed with extreme cold to be deadly, concluding that the reason he was able to resist the cold as well as he could while swimming was due to being intoxicated, after noting the diminishing amount of alcohol left in the bottle between video takes. Eckhoff refuted their comments, stating that they were "inventing facts" about the circumstances. He explained that he had only drunk a few sips, adding that the decreasing alcohol level was due to him filming on separate days with different bottles.

In February 2021, after the production of a video at lake Eikern, Eckhoff described being scolded after clambering out of the lake by someone concerned for his safety. Although frequently acquiring scrapes and cuts in the video process, he disagreed with the sentiments that the stunts he performed were dangerous, saying "Many regard falling through ice as life-threatening, but if you know what you're doing and have ice claws, then it's usually fine." (Note: Original Norwegian quote: "Mange ser på det å gå gjennom isen som livsfarlig, men hvis man vet hva man skal gjøre og har ispigger, går det gjerne greit.") He further added with a smile: "I shouldn't be cocky, I could very well die out here someday." (Note: Original Norwegian quote: "Jeg skal ikke være kjepphøy, og kan hende dør jeg der ute en gang" [sic]) On previous occasions he had mentioned rehearsing falling through ice adequately enough to justify his activities. This was in light of a near-fatal ice-skating accident he experienced in 2007, when he fell through the ice at lake Goksjø at night, after which he became determined to practice "going into the water, and getting back out again".

== Other ventures ==
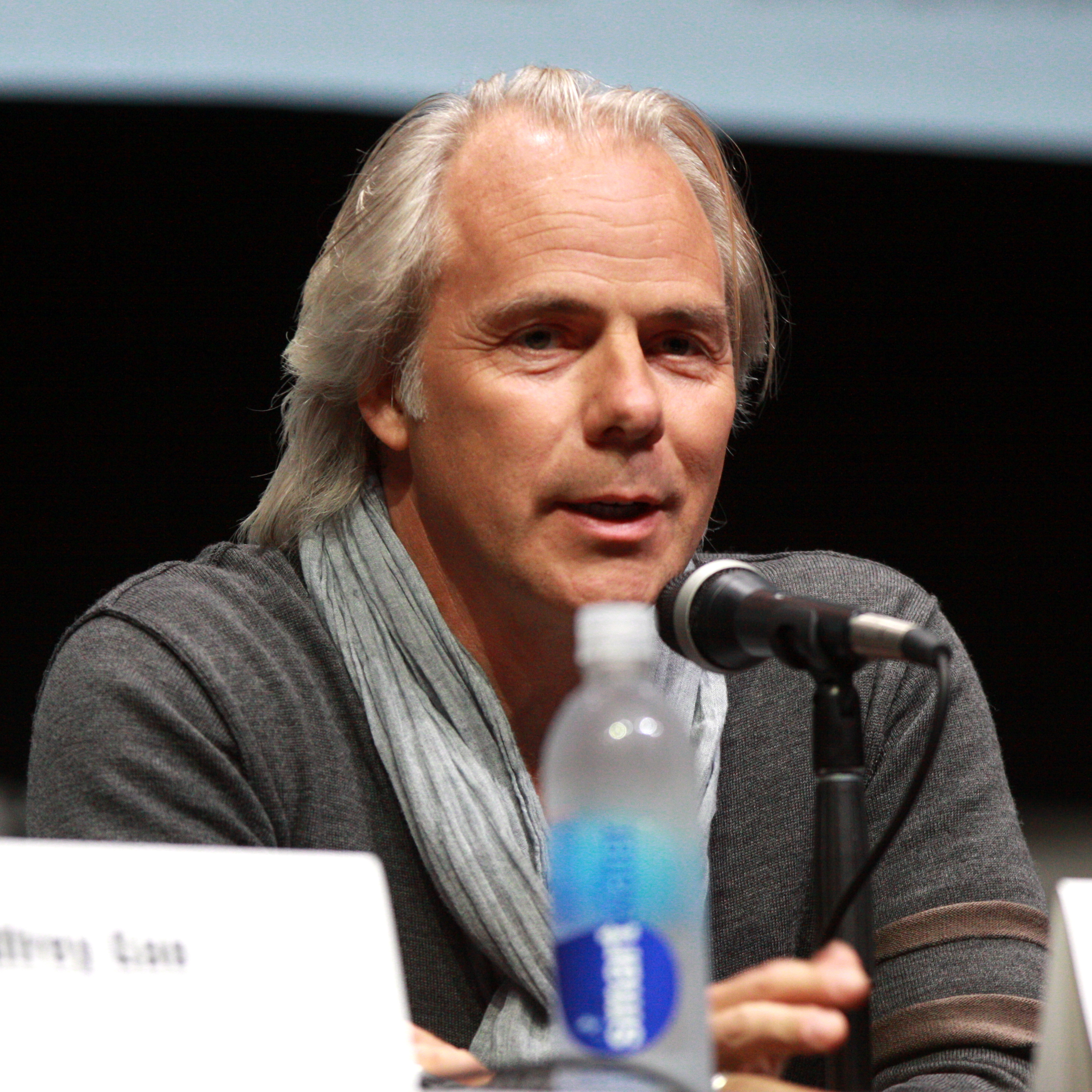
Eckhoff starred in the 2022 Harald Zwart film Lange Flate Ballær 3 (Long Flat Balls 3)

In May 2020, the video service Memmo, an online platform offering personalised video messages from celebrities, launched its Norwegian branch, with Eckhoff being one of the many taking part. By December, he had created and sent 263 videos to buyers, with a large portion being birthday and Christmas greetings, for 250 kr apiece. He noted that he only made around 50 kr from each video due having to pay income tax on profits, and the platform taking 25%.

In an August 2021 video uploaded to his YouTube channel, Eckhoff revealed that he would partake in the 2022 Harald Zwart film Lange Flate Ballær 3, the sequel to Lange Flate Ballær and Lange Flate Ballær 2, with him playing a villain. Later the same month, he was pictured by press at a shooting of the film in Fredrikstad. The following month, he uploaded a teaser for the film to his channel. Premiering in theatres on 1 April 2022, Eckhoff starred among Samantha Fox, Ulrikke Brandstorp, and Harald Rønneberg, among others.

== Death ==
On 26 November 2021, Eckhoff fell through the ice at Jakobs dam, a lake west of Kongsberg, while recording a video for his YouTube channel. After a witness reported hearing him calling for help, he was rescued by divers who performed CPR, before he was flown to Ullevål University Hospital by air ambulance. He died on 27 November at the hospital despite resuscitation attempts. The police reported that a hole had been cut into the ice of the lake, that he was alone at the scene of the accident, and that foul play was not suspected. His identity as the victim of the drowning was not disclosed until 28 November, when police reported on his death in a press release, with his family aware that his death was to be made public. At the time of his death, his channel had 1.2 million subscribers.

His last video, titled "I am Not Dead, I am 57 Today", was uploaded on 22 November 2021, five days before his death. He had been uploading similar videos since 2017, celebrating his birthday every year. In the comment section of the video, he received an outpouring of support after his death, including comments from the aforementioned 4ETG, and from notable individuals like musicians Alan Walker and PelleK. Similar sentiments of grief were expressed in the comments of his other videos for several days after his death, in addition to various other social media platforms, including Facebook, Reddit, and the Polish Wykop, where internet users conveyed how their holidays would be sad in his absence. Candles were also lit in his memory by fans outside the Norwegian embassy in Prague, Czechia.

His funeral was held at Orelund chapel in Sandefjord on 7 December. After the ceremony, his bier was transferred to Ekeberg graveyard.

Eckhoff is the namesake of the stonefly species Protonemura apetor, which was first described in July 2023.

Eckhoff's life was depicted over three episodes of the podcast series Historier fra virkeligheten ("Stories from Reality") published by NRK in October 2023. It was created by Sigurd Øygarden Flæten based on interviews with Eckhoff's family and friends.

== Selected videography ==
Top 10 most-viewed Apetor videos on YouTube
| # | Video name | Views (millions) | Upload date | Video |
|---|---|---|---|---|
| 1. | "The First Snow 4" | 106.2 | 17 November 2017 | |
| 2. | "The First Snow 5" | 28.9 | 8 November 2018 | |
| 3. | "The Haircut" | 22.1 | 7 August 2018 | |
| 4. | "On Thin Ice 9" | 18.5 | 12 February 2019 | |
| 5. | "Trip to Car Cemetery, Båstnäs Sweden" | 16.4 | 15 June 2019 | |
| 6. | "The Dog" | 16.4 | 15 November 2014 | |
| 7. | "The First Snow 3" | 15.6 | 13 November 2016 | |
| 8. | "The First Snow 6" | 12.9 | 15 November 2019 | |
| 9. | "The First Snow" | 9.1 | 15 November 2012 | |
| 10. | "Merry Christmas 2016" | 8.8 | 22 December 2016 | |
Video view counts sourced from YouTube; accurate as of 2 July 2026.
