= Skate guard =

Covers used to protect ice skate blades

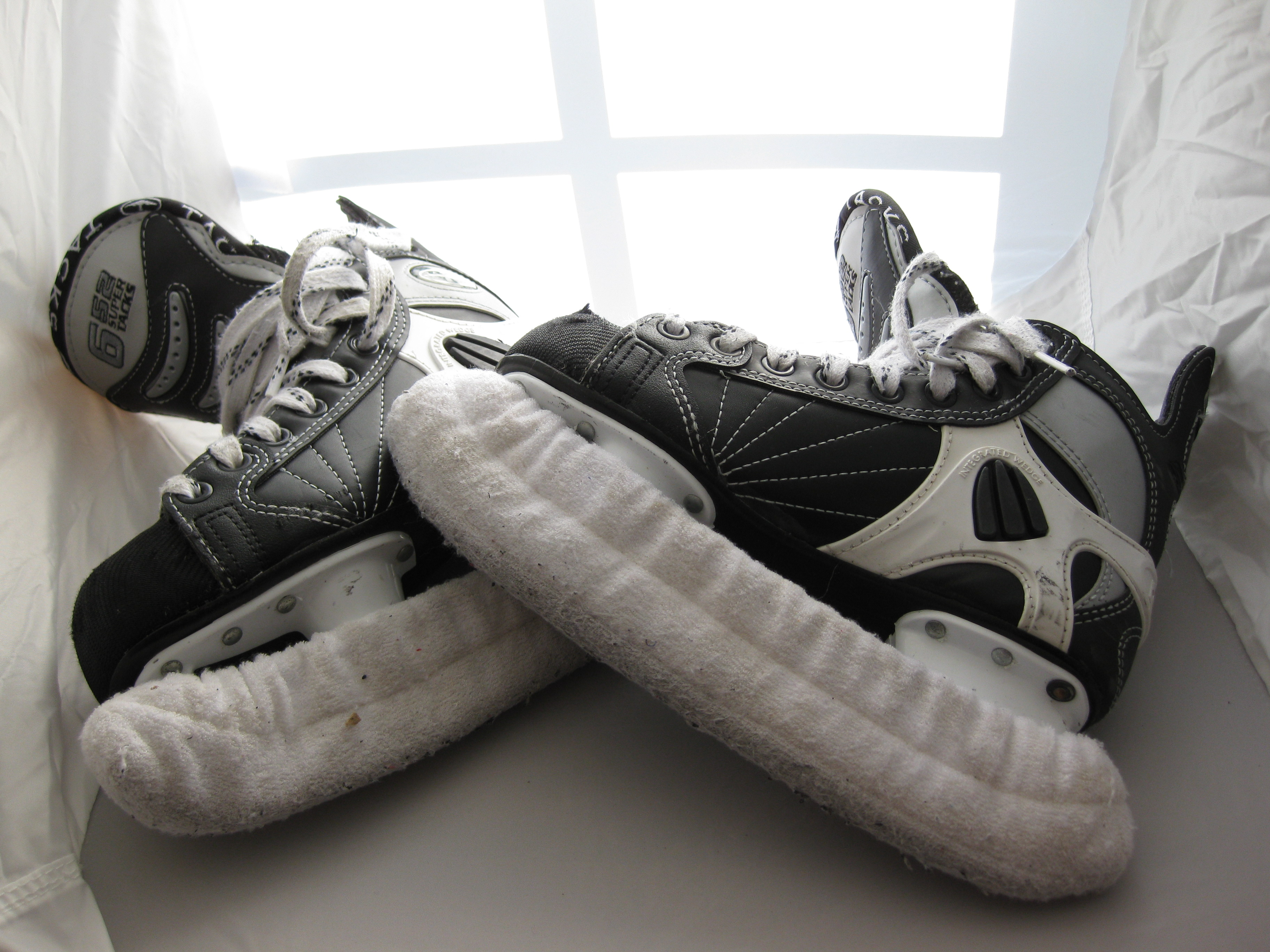
Skate guards

Hard and soft skate guards are covers used in ice hockey and figure skating that are worn over ice skate blades when the skater is off the ice. Plastic skate guards are used to keep the blades of skates sharp, and avoid any damage to blades when walking on other material. Fabric skate guards are used to prevent rusting on the blades after a session of ice skating. Hard guards are plastic used to keep the blades sharper for longer while walking short distances. Soft guards are used to make sure no moisture stays on the blades and allows rust to form on them.

== Use in Ice Hockey ==
Guards are used in ice hockey to protect the players' skates from damage by surfaces other than ice. They are placed over the top of the skate blade to cover it. They protect the blades from cement, rocks, metal or wood which can damage the skate blade, causing you to need to sharpen your skates sooner than you would need to otherwise. The skate guard is not used when on the ice, as the skates will slip from the plastic onto the ice. They can be taken off easily and are the best way to maintain good blade condition for a long time to keep skate strides smooth and fast.

=== Types of Hard Skate Guards ===
The most common type of skate guard is a plastic sheath that stays tight on the blades with metal springs. They can be trimmed to fit different sizes of blades. Manufacturers make them in many colors.

Another type of skate guard is the centipede guard, which has an elastic loop that fits around the top of the blade to keep the guard on.

== Use in figure skating ==
Figure skating guards are usually made of plastic with a simple spring or other mechanical device to hold the guards tightly to the blades. They can be found in many colors and with internal lights that blink as the skater walks. They are also called 'blade guards'. Figure skating guards historically were made of wood, but this has been supplanted in the last thirty years by plastic.

== Types of Guards ==
There are two different types of mainstream ice skate guards, in both figure skating and ice hockey. The first type is a Soft Guard, or Soakers. Soakers are a soft, plush type of guard that goes around the blade after it has been wiped off with a rag to help protect them during storage and keeping rust off the blade. Skate blades are very expensive, so you do not want to have to buy them extra just because you did not care for them properly.

The second type of skate guard is a hard guard. Hard guards are usually made from plastic or rubber. They help protect the guards when you are walking between a locker room or bench to the actual ice. This is to prevent any rocks, cement, or cracks in the rubber flooring of the rink from damaging, nicking, or dulling the blade. Hard guards also provide some extra stability when walking on land, but should not be relied upon for balance.

When you get to the ice, do not forget to take off the hard guards, because if you do so, it can lead to an embarrassing fall or injuries. This is because skate guards are essentially a wide piece of rubber that slips from under you with the slightest shift of weight. When you are putting your skates away, do not forget to put your soft guards, or Soakers back on to help elongate the blade usage.

== Safety ==
A common cause of accidents in skating rinks is to forget to remove the skate guard before stepping onto the ice. The skater's feet will slide out from under them, and result in an uncontrolled fall and, potentially, a blow to the head.
