= Ice claws =

Piece of safety equipment

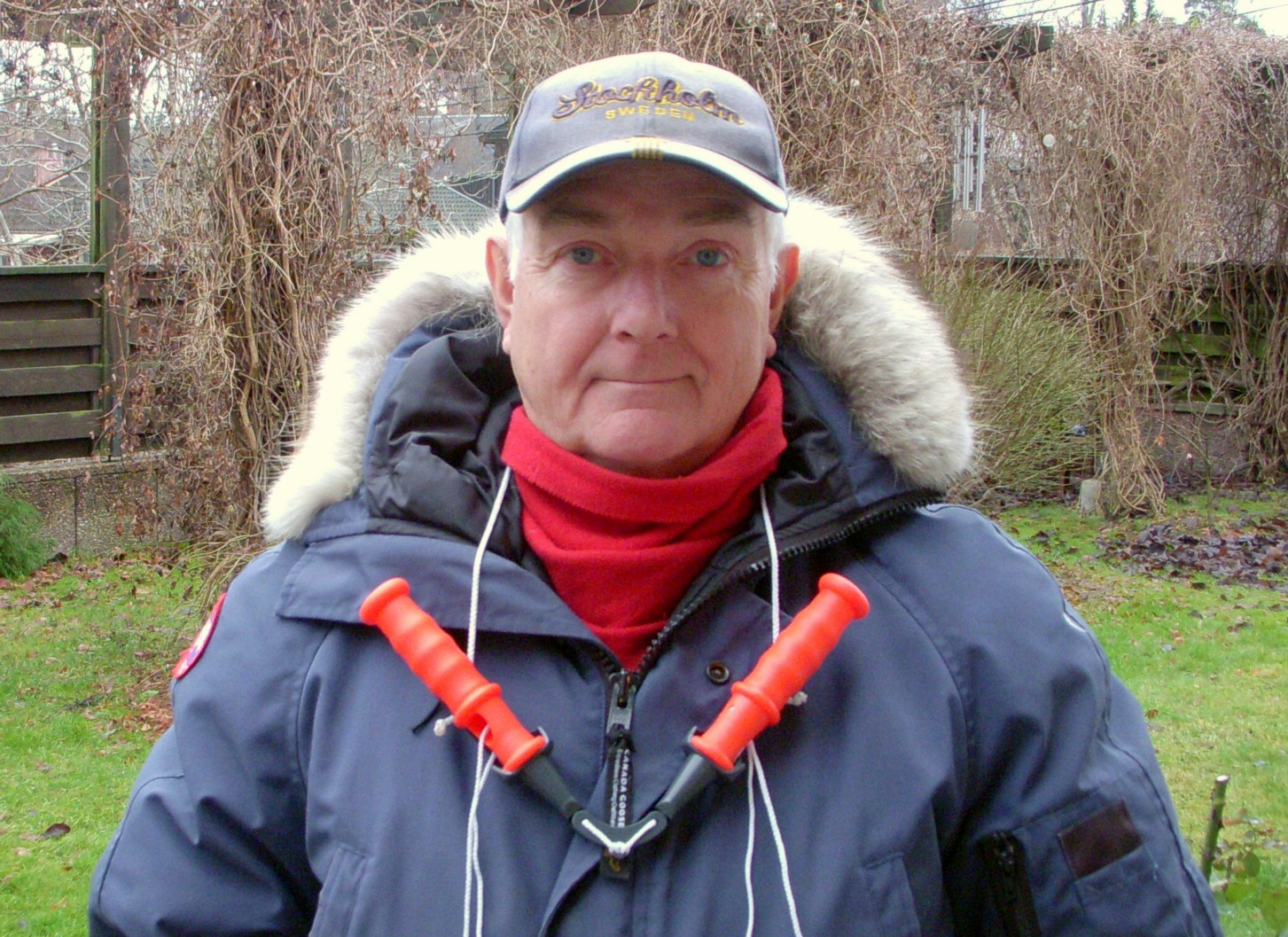
Ice claws carried around person's neck

Ice claws are a piece of safety equipment for pulling oneself to safety if one has fallen through ice. They are also called ice picks, safety claws, ice awls, bear claws or ice gripers and can be described as two handles with sharp points. Ice claws can be worn, for example, by tour skaters or ice fishers. They are often worn around the neck to be easily available in an emergency. Their sharp points provide grip on ice that is otherwise often too slippery for a person to pull themselves to safety.

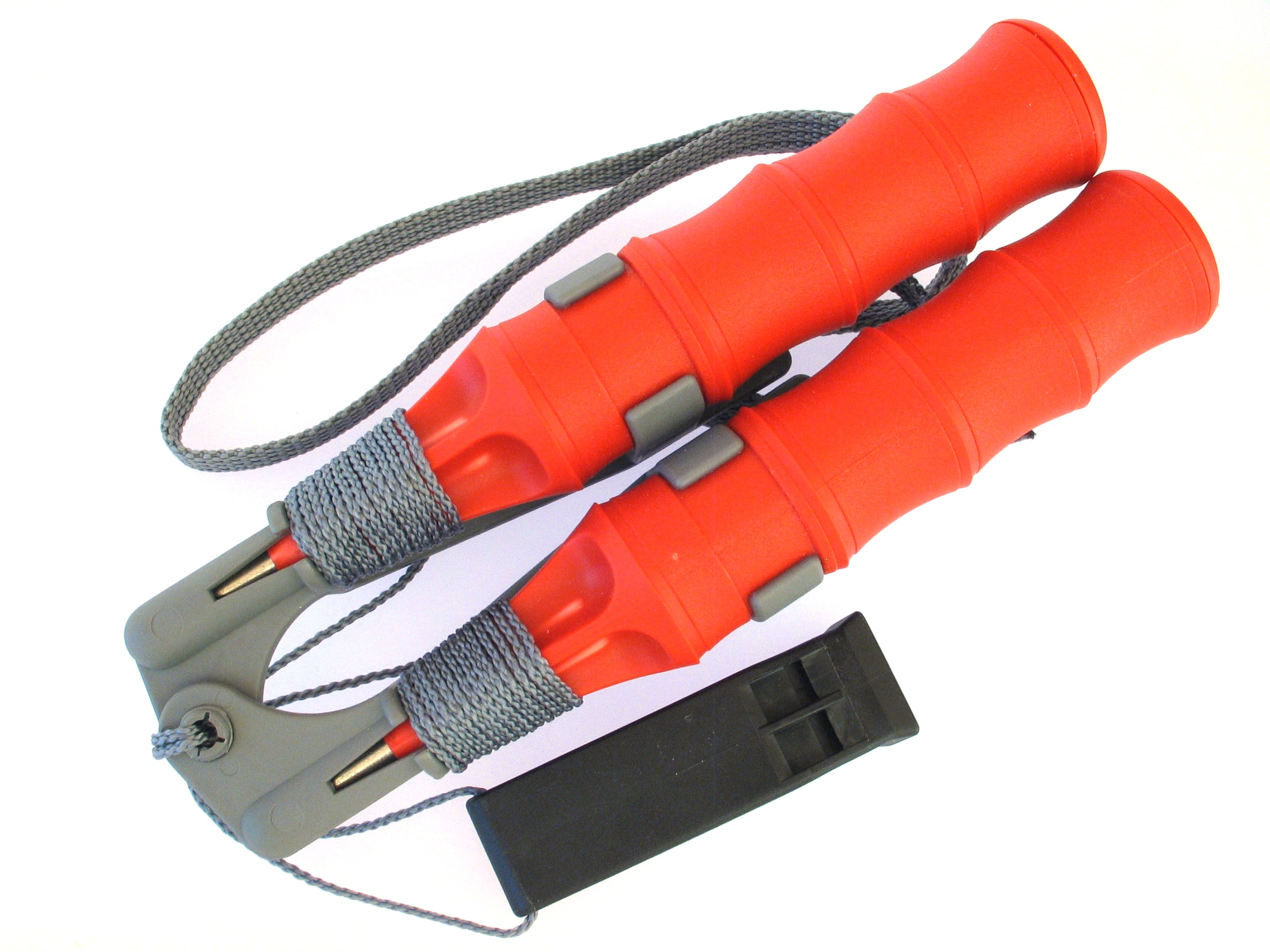
Ice claws with attached whistle
