= Ice skate =

Boots with blades attached to the bottom for propelling the bearer across a sheet of ice

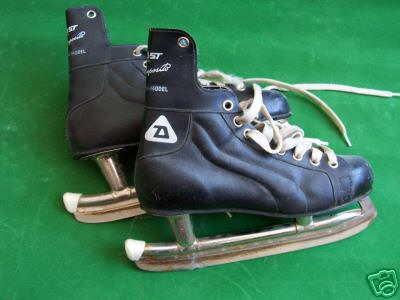
A pair of ice skates

Ice skates are metal blades attached underfoot and used to propel the wearer across a sheet of ice while ice skating.

The first ice skates were made from leg bones of horse, ox or deer, and were attached to feet with leather straps. These skates required a pole with a sharp metal spike that was used for pushing the skater forward, unlike modern bladed skates.

Samuel O. Klein, Ice Skate, c. 1937, NGA 14081, Index of American Design

Modern skates come in many different varieties, each suited to specific conditions or activities. People across the globe wear skates recreationally in ice rinks or on frozen bodies of water, and skates are the standard footwear in many sports, including figure skating, bandy, ice hockey, ringette, rink bandy, rinkball, speed skating and tour skating.

== History ==
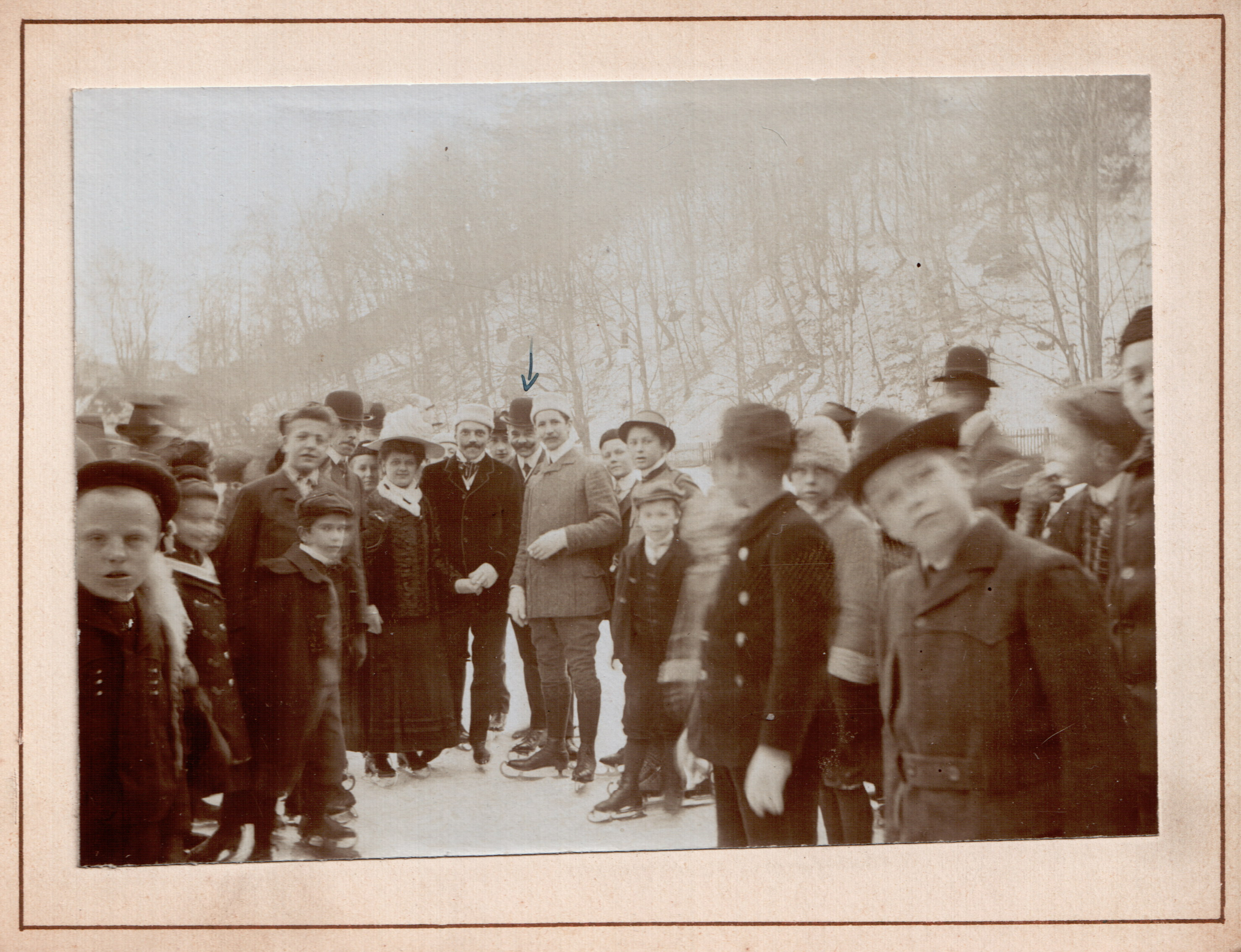
Ice skating in Graz in 1909

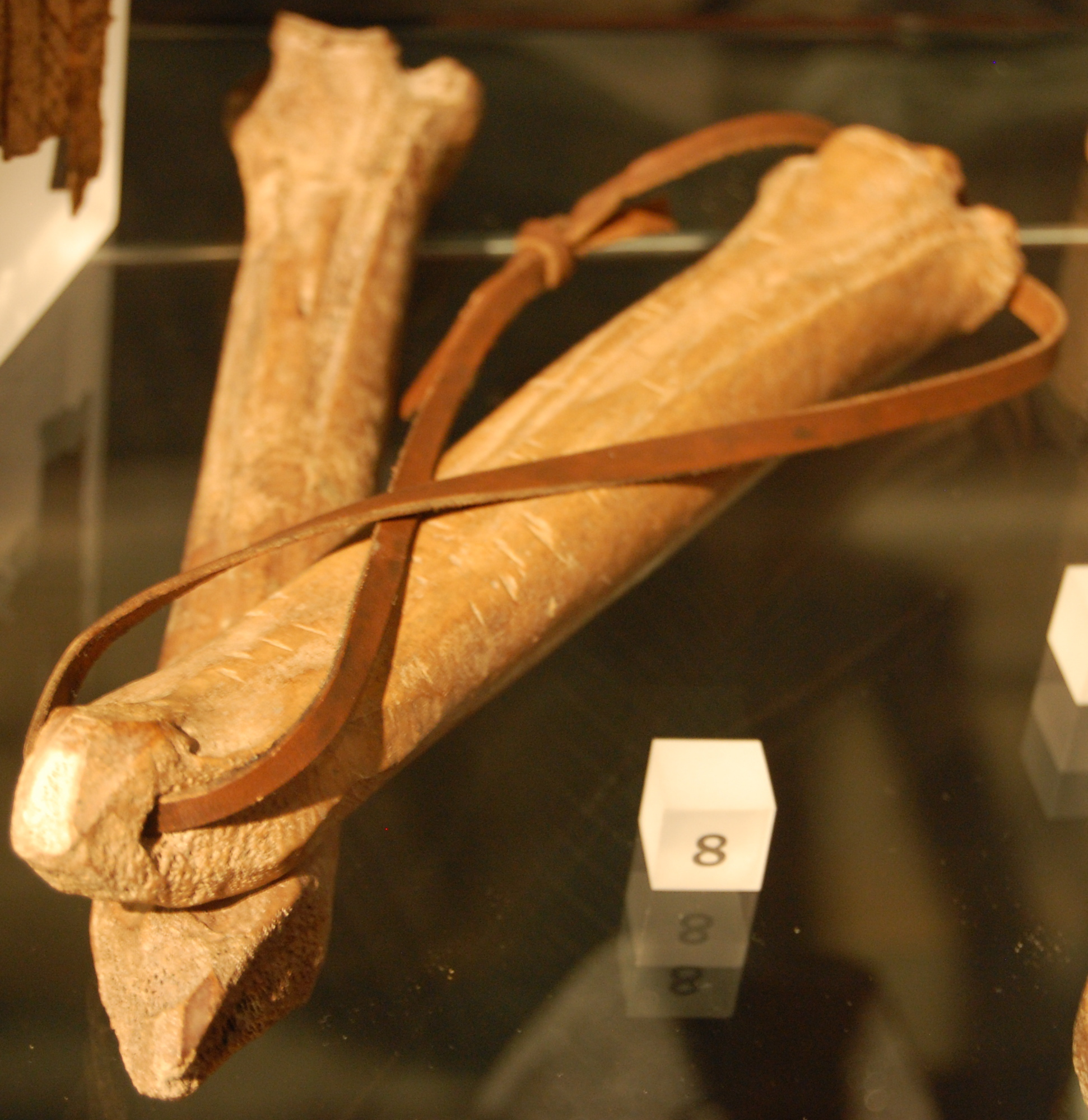
Medieval bone skates on display at the Museum of London

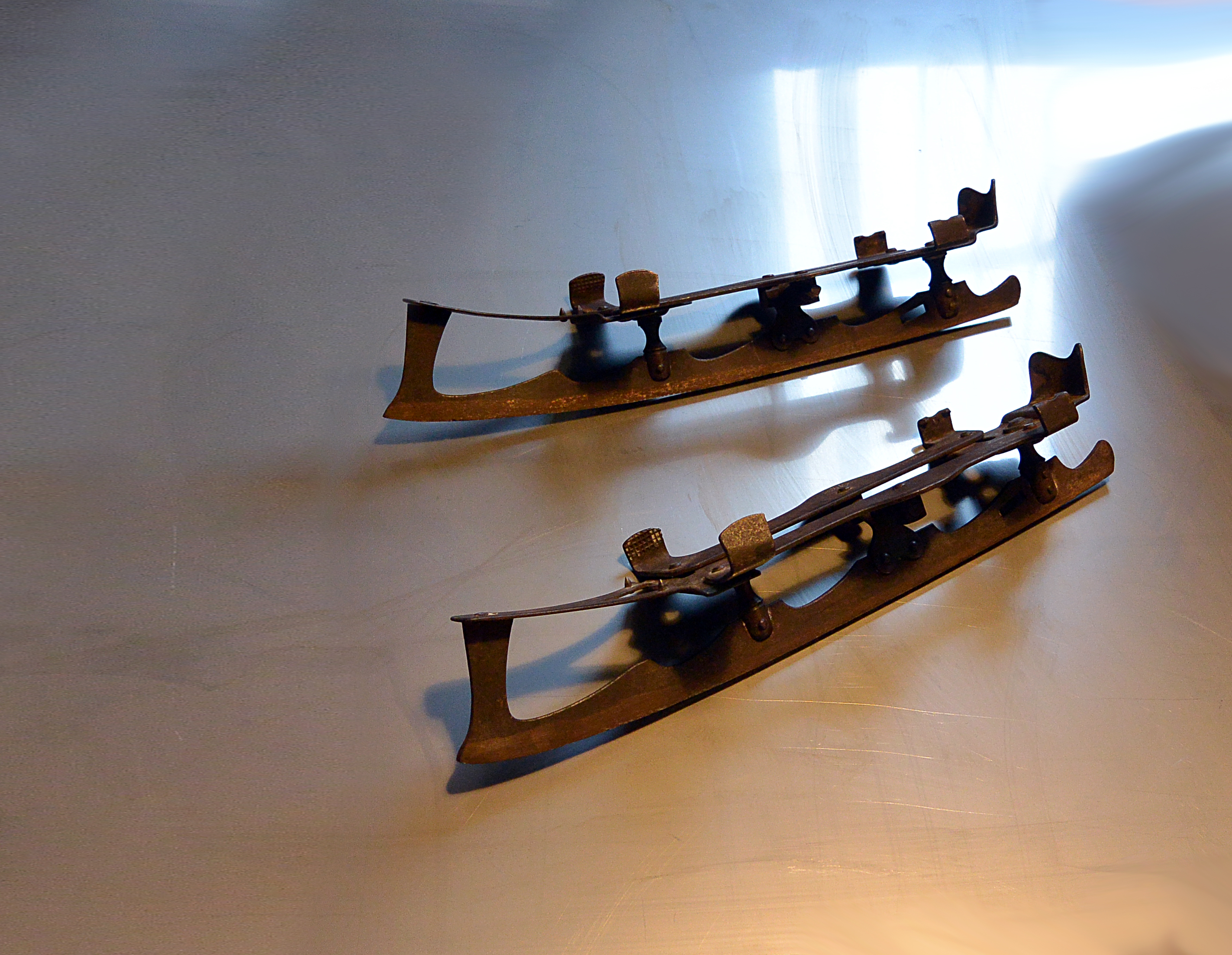
German ice skates from the 19th century, the boot came separately

According to a study done by Federico Formenti, University of Oxford, and Alberto Minetti, University of Milan, Finns were the first to develop ice skates some 5,000 years ago from animal bones. This was important for the Finnish populations to save energy in harsh winter conditions when hunting in Finnish Lakeland. Finland has about 187,888 lakes, which separated villages from each other. To travel between villages, the Finnish people had two options: to take a longer route around the lake, or to find a way across the frozen surface of the lake. The earliest known skate to use a metal blade was found in Fennoscandia, and was dated to 200 AD. It was fitted with a thin strip of copper folded and attached to the underside of a leather shoe.

Starting in 1976, during excavations of the city of York, UK, 42 pairs of Viking-era ice skates were found at Coppergate; the majority are made from horse leg bones, although cattle leg bones were also used. The bones were cut flat and polished on one side and drilled with a hole at one end. A leather thong, held in place by a wooden peg, was inserted into the hole to attach the skate to the wearer’s ankle. The Viking invasion of York took place on November 1, 866. This would suggest that bone ice skates were being used in England from the ninth century.

William Fitzstephen, writing in the 12th century, described the use of bone skates in London. The following seems to be an Early Modern English translation of the Latin original:

when the great fenne or moore (which watereth the walles of the citie on the North side) is frozen, many young men play upon the ice, some striding as wide as they may, doe slide swiftly... some tye bones to their feete, and under their heeles, and shoving themselves by a little picked staffe, doe slide as swiftly as birde flyeth in the aire, or an arrow out of a crossbow.

In the 13th century, the Dutch revolutionized ice skating by sharpening the blades of ice skates, which were made of steel at the time. This change gave skaters greater control over their movements, allowing them to propel themselves with their legs rather than rely on sticks. By the 14th century, iron-bladed skates had replaced bone skates in many regions. In the 15th century, another distinctive design feature emerged: a curled toe at the front of the blade. Federico Formenti, a physiologist and sports scientist at King’s College London, suggested that this curl may have echoed the natural shape of earlier bone skates or served a practical purpose by preventing the tip from catching in the ice. Fashion may also have played a role.

Margaret Stottlemeyer, Ice Skate, c. 1937. Watercolor, 25.3 x 33.9 cm, National Gallery of Art, Index of American Design

== Types of ice skates ==
There are five main types of ice skates: the figure skate, the ice hockey skate, the bandy skate, the racing skate, and the touring skate.

=== Figure skates ===
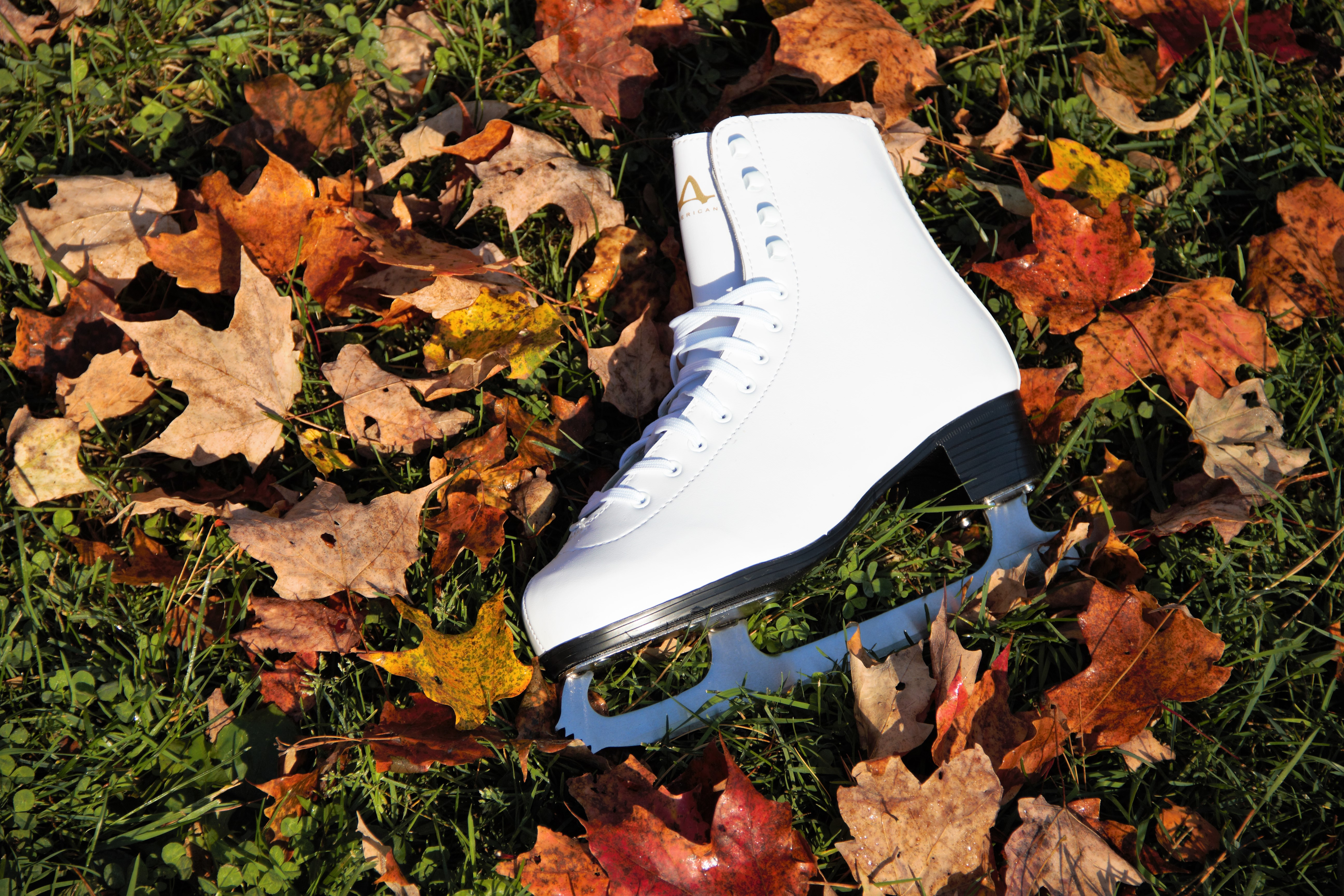
Figure skate

Figure skates are used in the sport of figure skating. Unlike hockey skates, they have saw-toothed toe picks, also known as toe-rakes, on the front of the blade. The blades are usually made out of stainless steel or aluminium with a steel runner. The toe pick has a variety of uses, but is most commonly used for certain jumps in figure skating, such as the Lutz jump and toe loop, or starting a backspin. Figure skating boots are typically made of several layers of leather and the leather is very stiff to provide ankle support. In addition, the figure skate's blade is curved, allowing for minute adjustments in balance and weight distribution.

The base of the figure-skate blade is slightly concave, or "hollow ground". The hollow, which runs the length of the blade, creates two edges, which come in contact with the ice.

=== Ice hockey skates ===
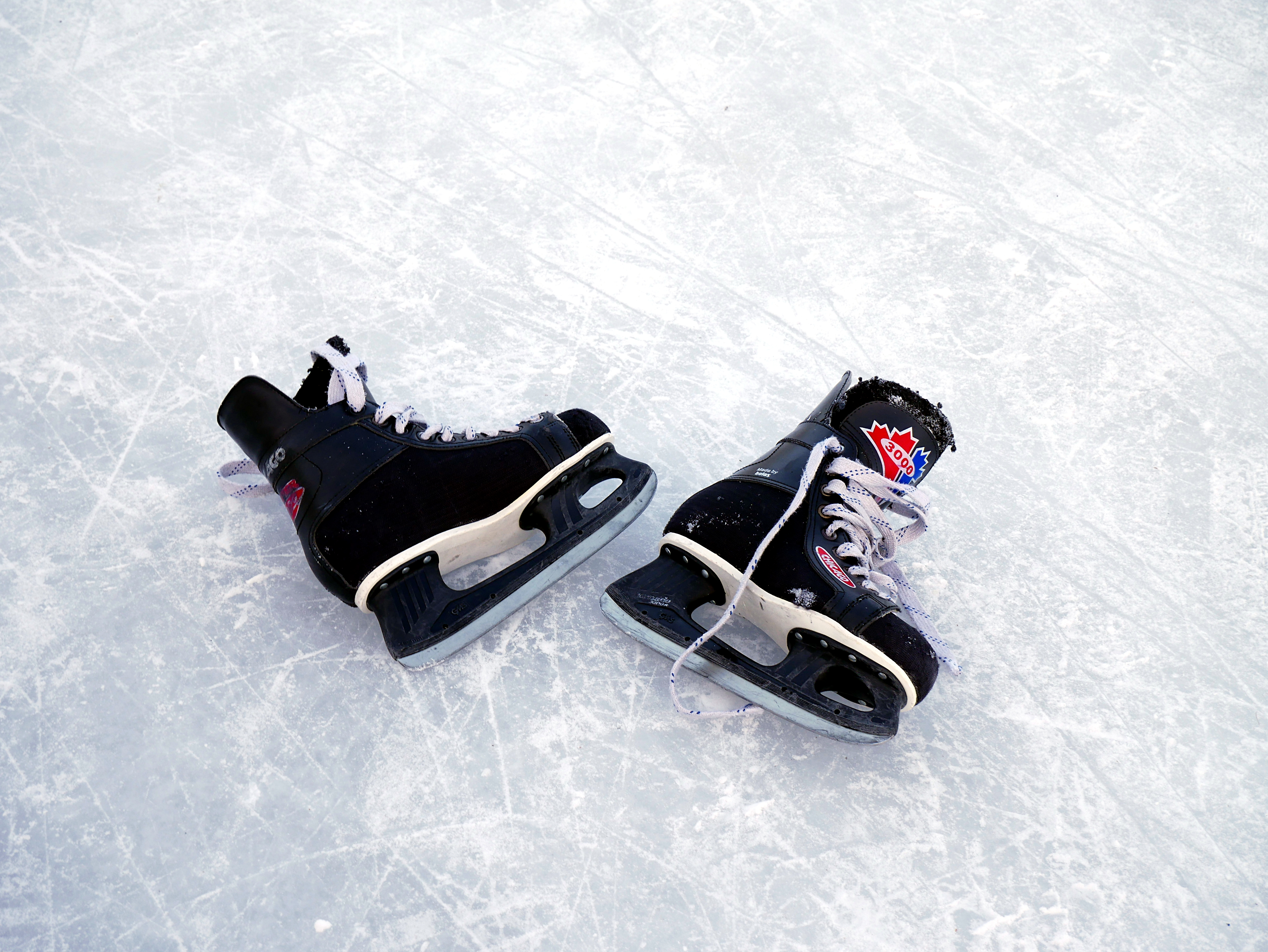
Ice hockey skates

Ice hockey skates are used for playing the games of ice hockey and ringette but are occasionally used for recreational ice skating alone. Each individual skate consists of a boot, laces, blade, and a blade holder. The boot is generally made of molded plastic, leather (often synthetic), ballistic nylon, or a thermoformed composite material. Each skate blade has two edges. Skates used in competitive ice hockey and ringette rarely use molded plastic for the upper boot, as this results in limited mobility.

=== Ice hockey goalie skates ===
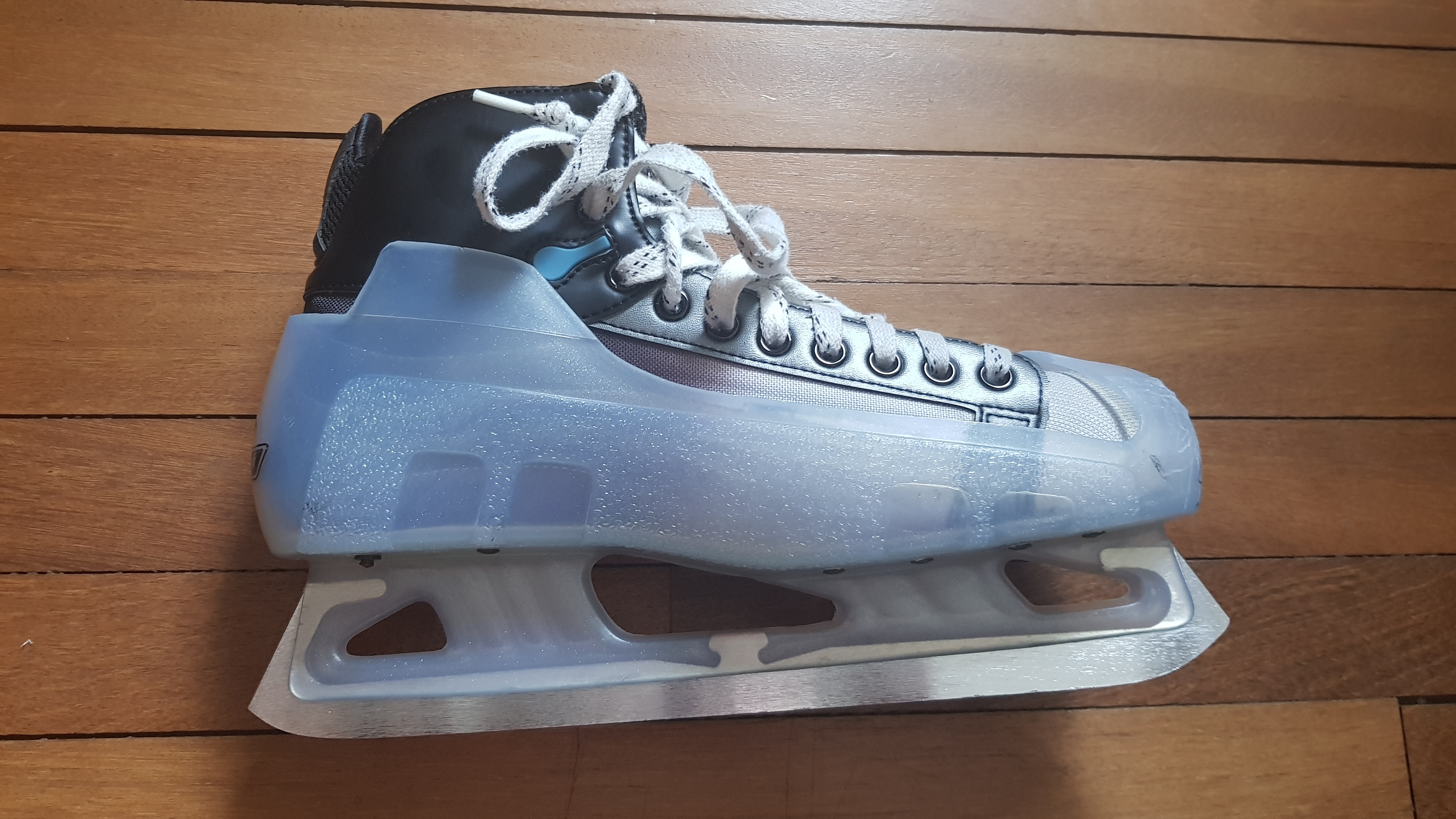
Ice hockey goaltender skate

The skates used by goaltenders are cut lower in the ankle than a normal hockey skate and the boot sits closer to the ice for a lower center of gravity. The boot itself is encased in hardened plastic, called a "cowling", protecting the toe, ankle and heel from the force of the shot puck. The blade is usually longer and has less rocker (curvature to the blade) to make it easier for the goalie to move side to side in the crease. Goalie skates lack a tendon guard. Unlike regular hockey skates, goalie skates are usually protected by a synthetic material covering the toe-part of the skate. This is to prevent damage from the puck. The blade of the goalie skate is not as useful in turning as regular hockey skates, because the blade is rockered less, thus making turns slightly inconvenient. The material used to make the boot of the goalie skate historically was a harder synthetic material than regular hockey boots.

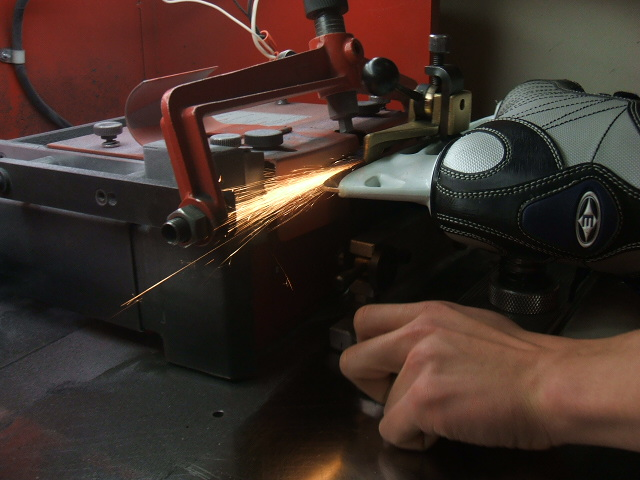
Hockey skate being sharpened

Sharpening ice hockey skates plays a key factor in a player's ability to skate and players will sharpen their skates hundreds of times throughout their career. Similar to figure skates, the blade is hollow ground in cross section, creating two edges that contact and cut into the ice, allowing increased maneuverability. The blades are sharpened with round-edged grinding wheels that create the two edges. The wheels grind out a hollow semi-circle along the length of the underside of the blade, forming the sharp edge on each side. Skate blade sharpness is measured by the thickness of the round-edged grinding wheel being used, the smaller the radius, the sharper the edge will be. The sharpness chosen by a player is based completely upon preference, not player size or level of play. While a one-half-inch (13 mm) radius of hollow is the most common and standard sharpening for most players, the standard radius of hollow for goalies is three-quarters inch (19 mm).

=== Bandy skates ===
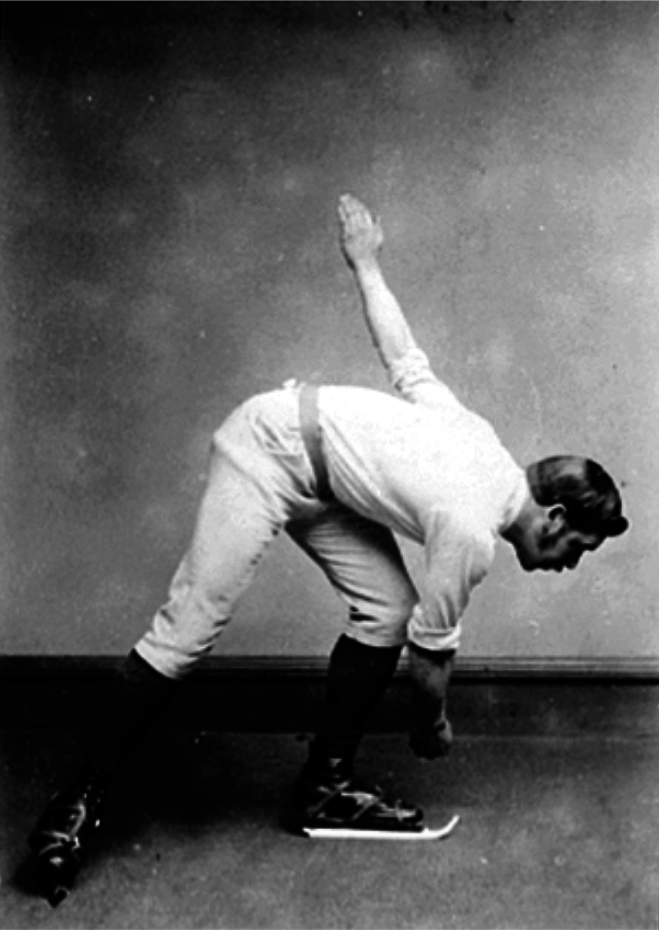
Charles Goodman Tebbutt doing a speed skating pose in 1889. He published the first set of rules for bandy

Bandy skates are used for playing the sports of bandy, rink bandy (bandy variant), and rinkball. The boot is generally made of leather (often synthetic) and often excludes tendon guards. The boot style for bandy skates is lower than the ice hockey version and often doesn't cover the ankles. The bandy skate is designed with the intention of preventing them from causing injury to an opponent due to its long, and relatively sharp angled blades. The blade is generally an inch longer than the hockey skates, allowing for higher speeds on the large bandy field (also called a "bandy rink). The Russian bandy skates have an even longer blade and a very low cut shoe.

Bandy blades are sharpened differently than those on ice hockey skates with the bottom part of the bandy blade which touches the ice surface being flatter and generally excluding a hollow. Ice hockey blades are sharpened in a manner that creates two side edges which make contact with the ice. As a result, and by comparison, sharp cornering and "tight turns" which are maneuvers that can be achieved using the design of an ice hockey skate are not achievable on bandy skates. While the design of the modern ice hockey skate allows for sharper and faster maneuverability, modern bandy skates allow for more distance to be covered at a higher speed.

=== Racing skates ===
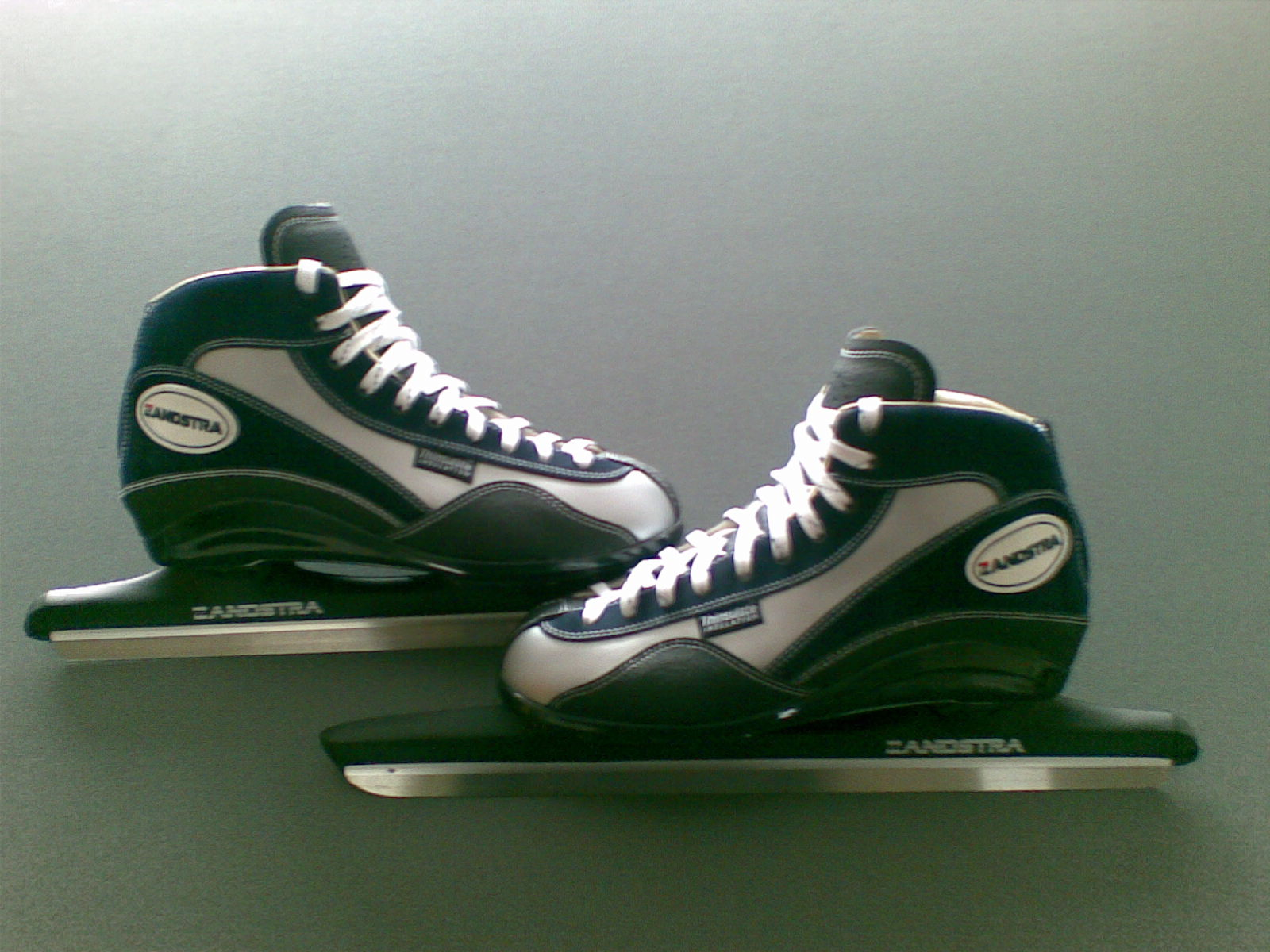
Modern "Comfort" speed skates

Racing clap skates

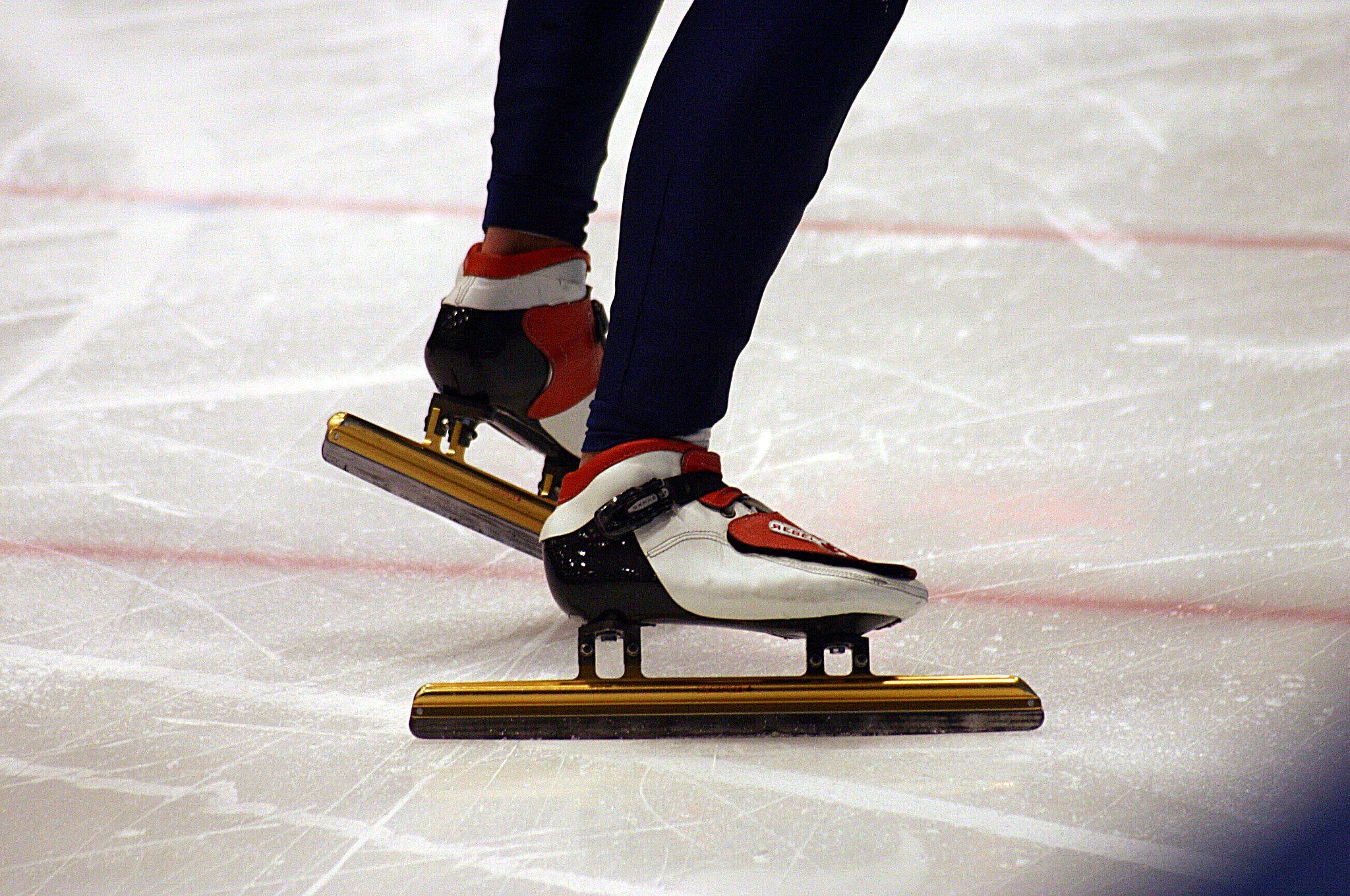
Short track speed skates

Racing skates, also known as speed skates, have long blades and are used for speed skating. A clap skate (or clapper skate) is a type of skate where the shoe is connected to the blade using a hinge. Short track racing skates have a longer overall height to the blade to allow for deep edge turns without the boot contacting the ice. For better turning ability, racing skates may have a radius, from 8 metres (26 ft) for short track to 22 metres (72 ft) for long track. Racing skates have a completely flat bottom. There is no hollow, only a squared off bottom with two edges. This improves glide time, by not cutting into the ice.

=== Touring skates ===
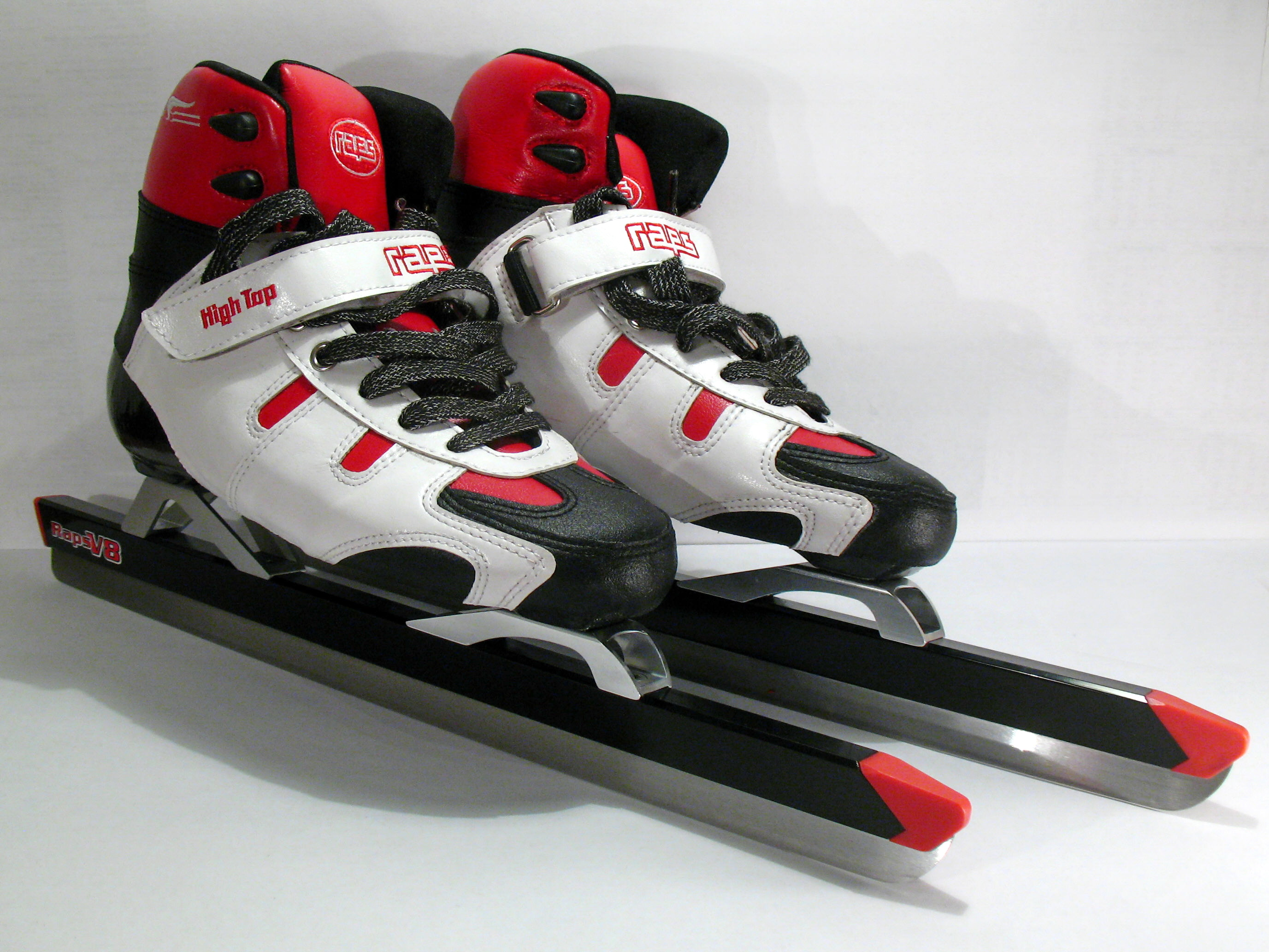
Modern Dutch tour skates

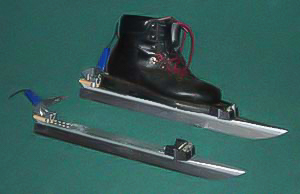
Fixed heel binding and "duckbill boot"

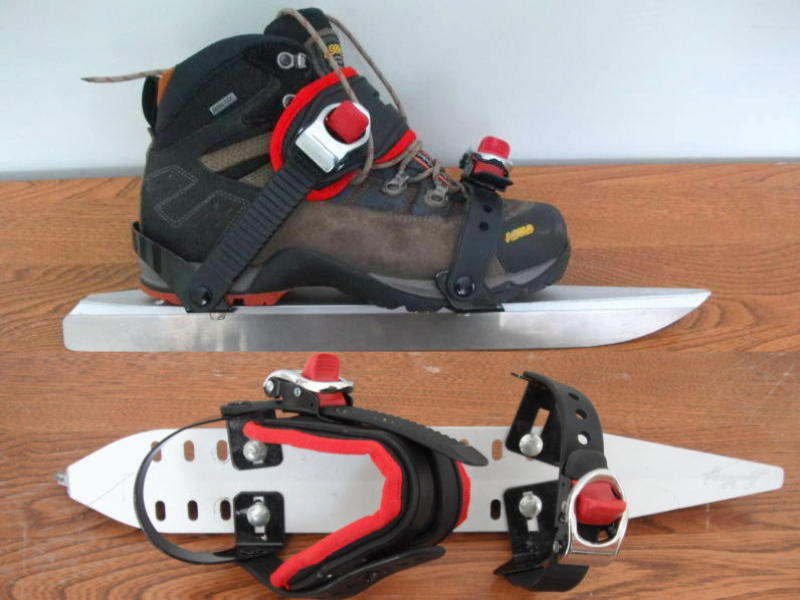
Touring skate with Multiskate binding for hiking boots

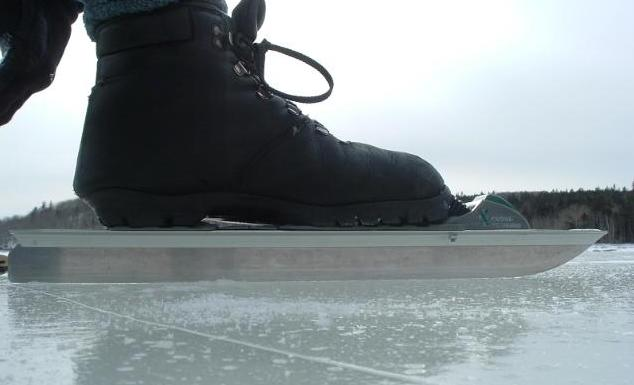
Touring skate for ski boots and free-heel binding on ice

Touring skates (or Nordic skates) are long blades that can be attached, via bindings, to hiking or cross-country ski boots and are used for long distance tour skating on natural ice. The blades are approximately 50 cm (20 in) long with a radius of curvature (or rocker) of about 25 m (82 ft). The blades are from 1 to 1.5 mm (0.04 to 0.06 in) wide, with a flat cross-section. The length and long radius of the blades makes touring skates more stable on uneven natural ice than skates with shorter, more rockered blades. Since tour skating often involves walking (kluning) between lakes or around sections not suitable for skating, the removable blades are an asset. Thus, these skates are often called kluunschaats in the Netherlands.

With most modern models of skates, the blades are bonded to the bottom of an aluminum foot-plate. A binding for a specific type of boot is mounted on the top of the foot-plate. Traditionally, the bindings held down both toe and heel of the boot (fixed-heel). Some bindings require special boots like telemark ski boots with a "duck-bill" shaped toe, others, like the Multiskate, have padded adjustable straps that will attach to most hiking boots.

Since the early 1990s, models have been designed for mounting free-heel cross-country ski bindings to the skates, and thus attach matching ski boots to the skates. The free-heel models give the equivalent effect as the klap skate form of speed skates. There are several makers of these skates in Sweden, Netherlands, and Finland.

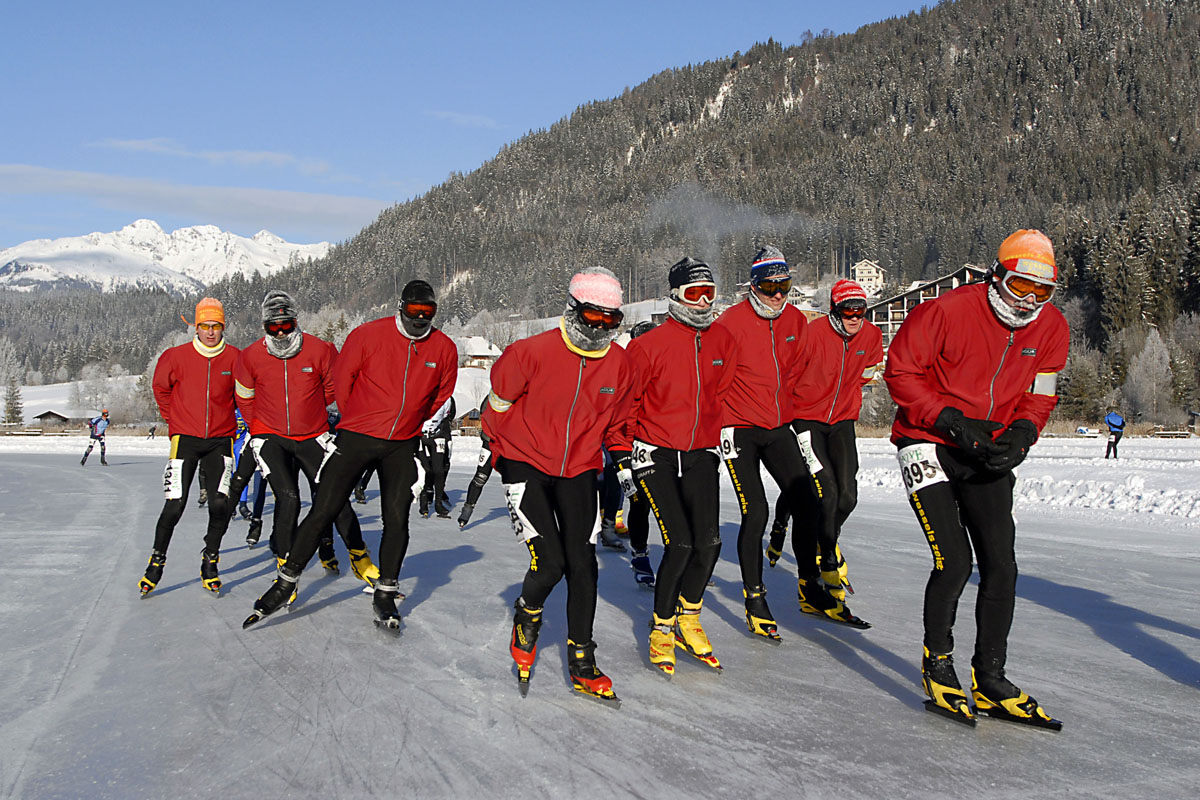
Skaters in a marathon race using nordic skates

Although mainly used for non-competitive touring, nordic skates are sometimes used in marathon speed skating races on natural ice, such as Vikingarännet (The Viking Run), a long-distance tour skating event in Sweden. Nordic skates are also used in Winter triathlon races.

==== Historical wooden touring skates ====
Before 1970, most touring skates had a wooden foot-plate which was attached to the boot with leather straps. Examples were the Gillbergs skate from Sweden, and the Stheemann "wooden Norwegian" from the Netherlands. Even earlier, in the years 1870 to 1900, there were very similar models made in North America, like the Donaghue from the U.S. In 1875, the Friese doorloper, a design in which the blade extended several inches behind the heel, was introduced in the Netherlands. It was popular with both tour skaters (both casual and competitive) and sprint skaters (kortebaanschaatsen), and remained popular until some years after the Second World War.

=== Recreational skates ===
Inexpensive skates for recreational skaters usually resemble either figure skates or hockey skates, but recreational ice skates resembling inline skates with a molded plastic boot are also available. These recreational skates are commonly rented from ice rinks by beginners who do not own their own skates. In the non-American English-speaking world, they are sometimes called 'death wellies' by skaters who own their own equipment because of their appearance and their reputation for giving the wearer blisters. People who own their own skates may further reduce the risk of blisters by adding a friction management patch to areas inside the skate that could rub or chafe.

=== Double runner ===
Also known as twin blade skates, cheese cutters, bob skates, or bobby skates, these skates are worn by young children who are learning. The double blades increase stability and help the child to balance.

== See also ==
- Inline skates
- List of shoe styles
- Roller skates
