= Tour skating =

Recreational ice skating

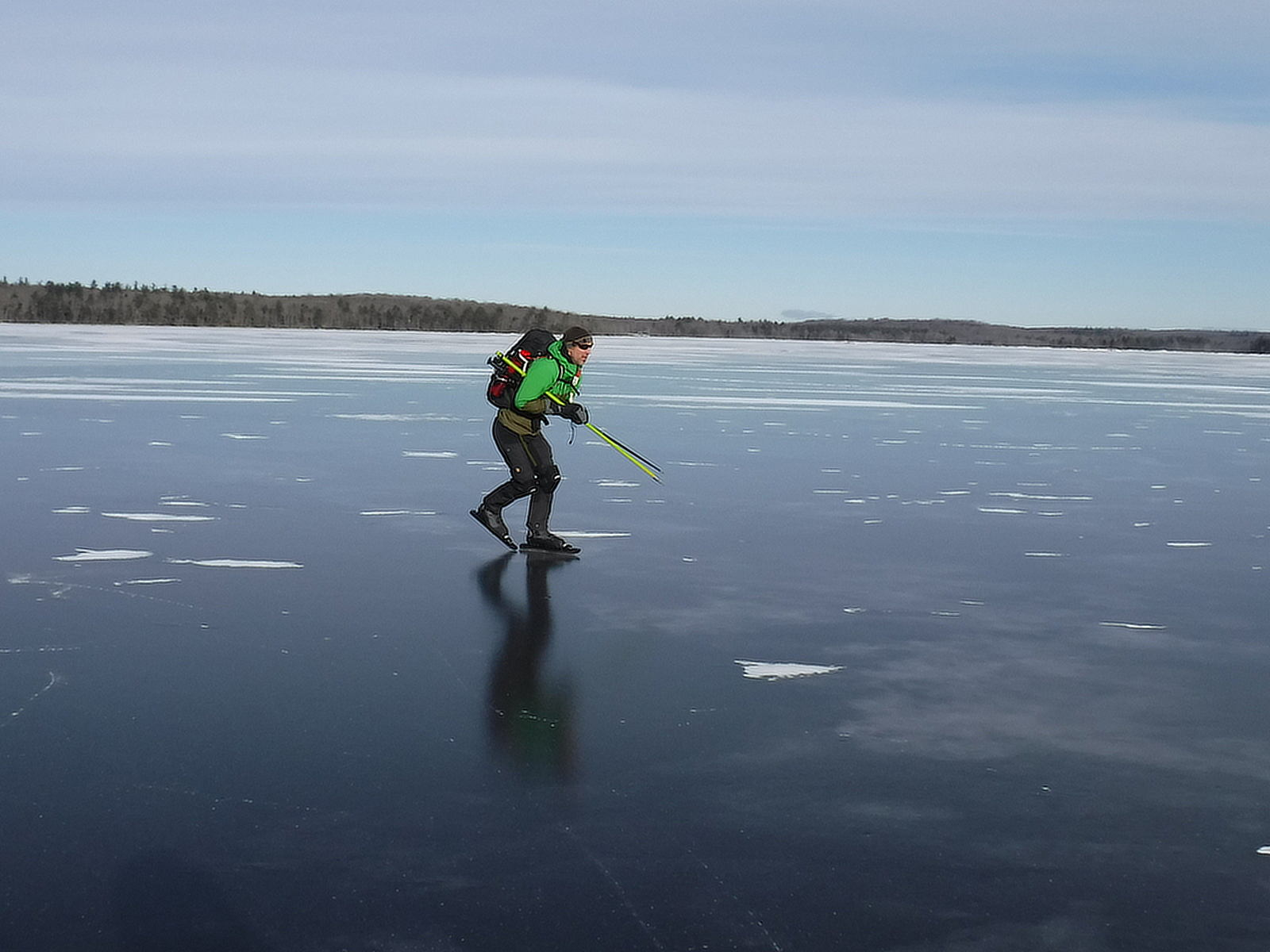
- Skating on Gaspereau Lake, Nova Scotia
- Nicknames: (Canada) (United States) North America: Nordic skating; long distance skating; trip skating; wild skating; cross-country-skating; backcountry skating; (Sweden) Swedish: långfärdsskridskoåkning; (Finland) Finnish: retkiluistelu; (Norway) Norwegian: turskøyting; (Netherlands) Dutch: toerschaatsen

Characteristics
- Contact: No
- Team members: Individual, pairs or groups
- Type: Recreational ice skating; Distance sport; Winter sport
- Equipment: Nordic tour skates; Dutch tour skates; Ice claws or ice prods; Ice pike or hansa pole; Throwing line; Backpack with waistband and groin strap; Knee pads; Elbow pads; Helmet
- Venue: Frozen bodies of water

Tour skating is recreational long distance ice skating on natural ice. It is particularly popular in the Netherlands and the Nordic countries. It is becoming more popular in areas of North America such as New England, Southcentral Alaska, and Nova Scotia.

While Nordic skating usually involves tours over open ice on marshes, lakes, rivers, or sea, in the Netherlands skaters follow marked routes on frozen canals and connected lakes. Consequently, there are differences in equipment and skating styles between these two regions. Alaskans often include winter camping on longer journeys of a hundred miles or more.

Nordic skating is a popular activity in Sweden but is also becoming more popular in Finland and Norway, where it is called långfärdsskridskoåkning (in Swedish), retkiluistelu (in Finnish) and turskøyting (in Norwegian). In Canada and the United States this style is often called Nordic skating. Other names used are trip skating and wild skating.

Dutch skating is called toerschaatsen and is regarded by some as a sport in its own right.

== Nordic skating ==
Nordic skating originated during the 1900s in Sweden. It usually involves choosing your own tours over the open ice, sometimes in groups normally with safety equipment. Nordic skates differ significantly from the Dutch tour skates.

=== Nordic equipment ===
Nordic tour skates are fitted with a blade approximately 50 cm long and are attached with bindings to specialized boots similar to walking boots or cross country skiing boots, often with a free heel. Since tour skating often involves walking between lakes or around sections not suitable for skating, the fact that the blades can be easily removed from the boots is convenient.

In addition the following safety equipment is often recommended:

- ice prods or ice claws - a pair of metal spikes with handles like sharpened screwdrivers for hauling yourself out of holes in the ice
- ice pike or hansa pole - a pole with a metal spike like a particularly sturdy ski pole used to test ice thickness
- throwing line - a rope to be pulled out of the water by
- backpack with waistband and groin strap containing a change of clothes in dry bags. This also acts as a buoyancy aid.

Knee and elbow pads and a helmet are also commonly used.

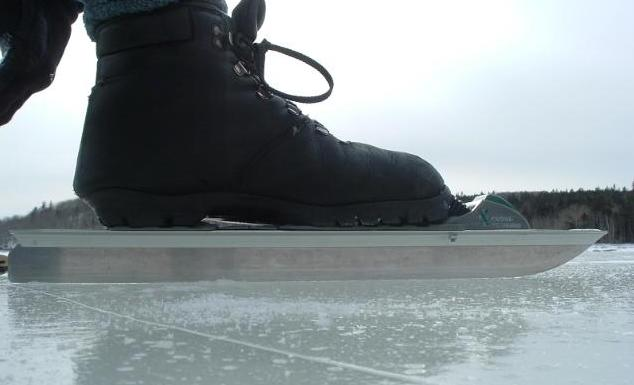
Touring skate with cross country ski bindings and boots

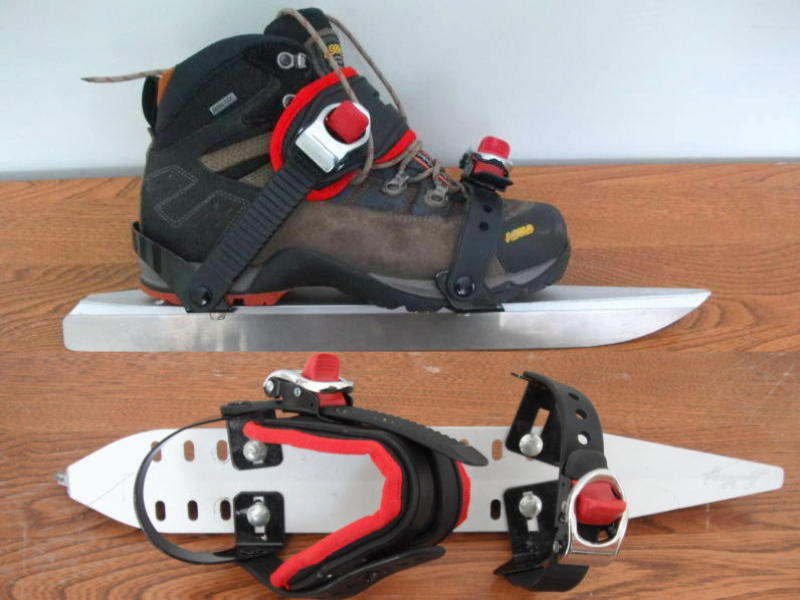
Touring skates with bindings for hiking boots

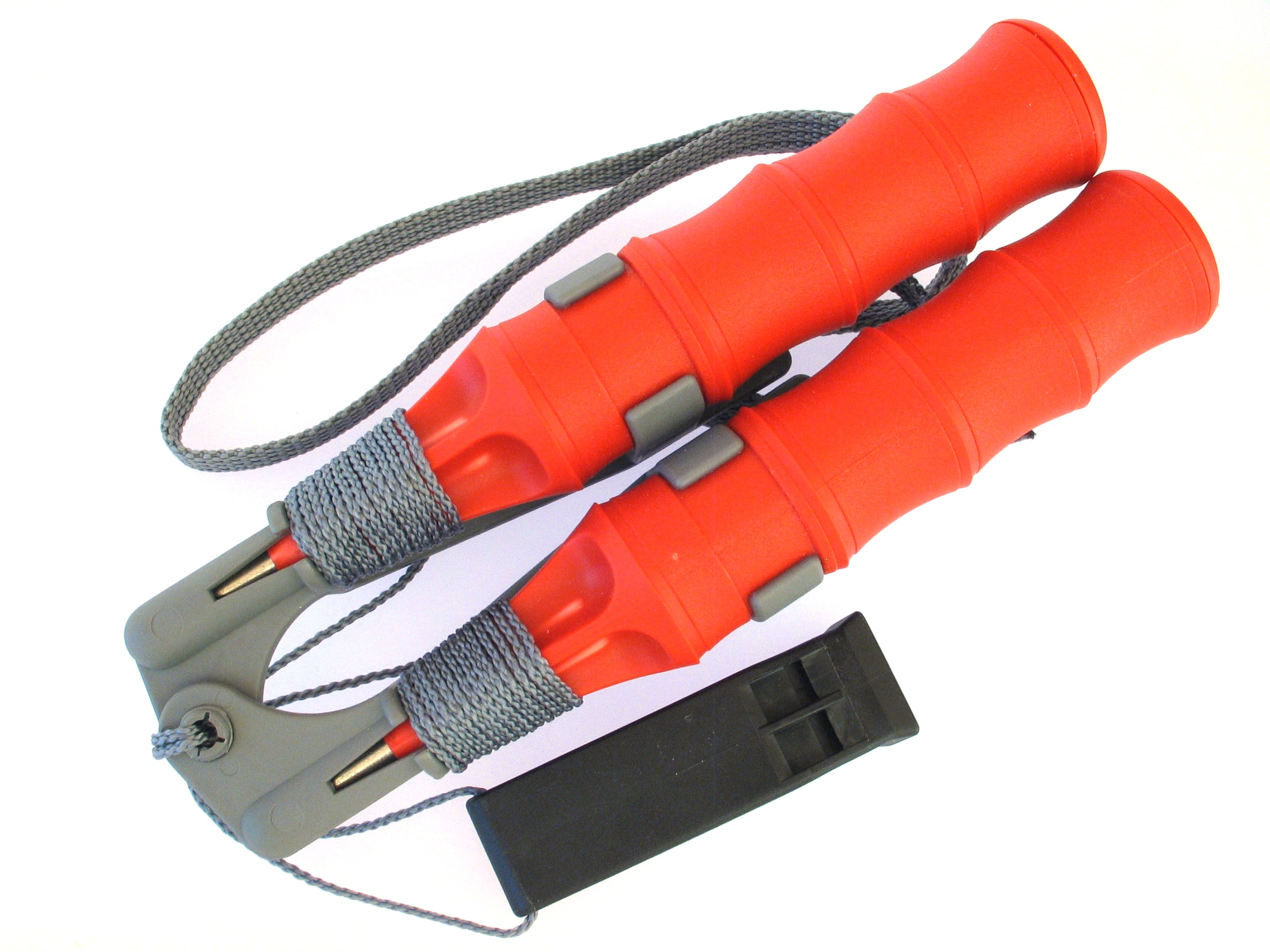
Ice claws

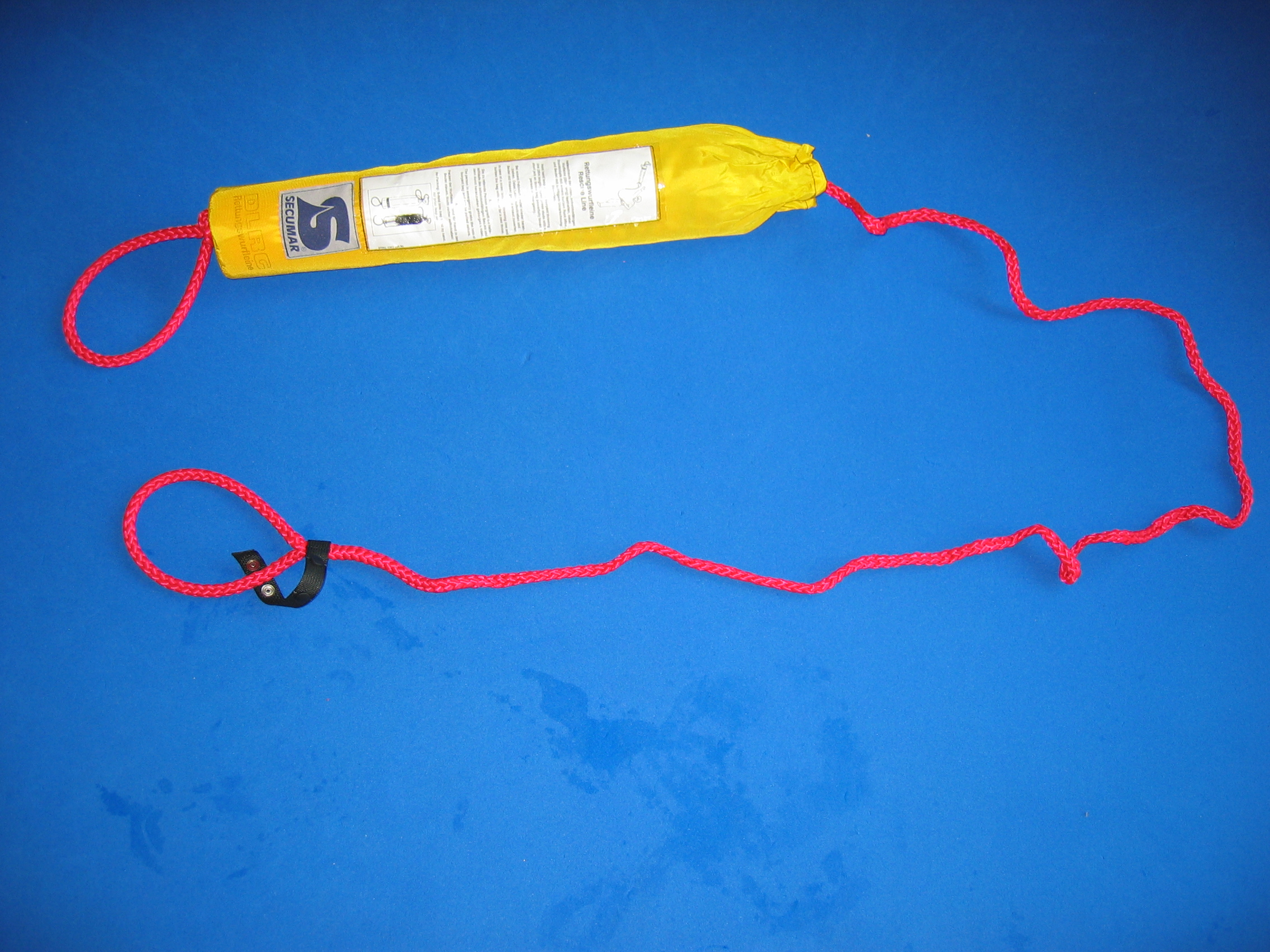
Throw rope bag

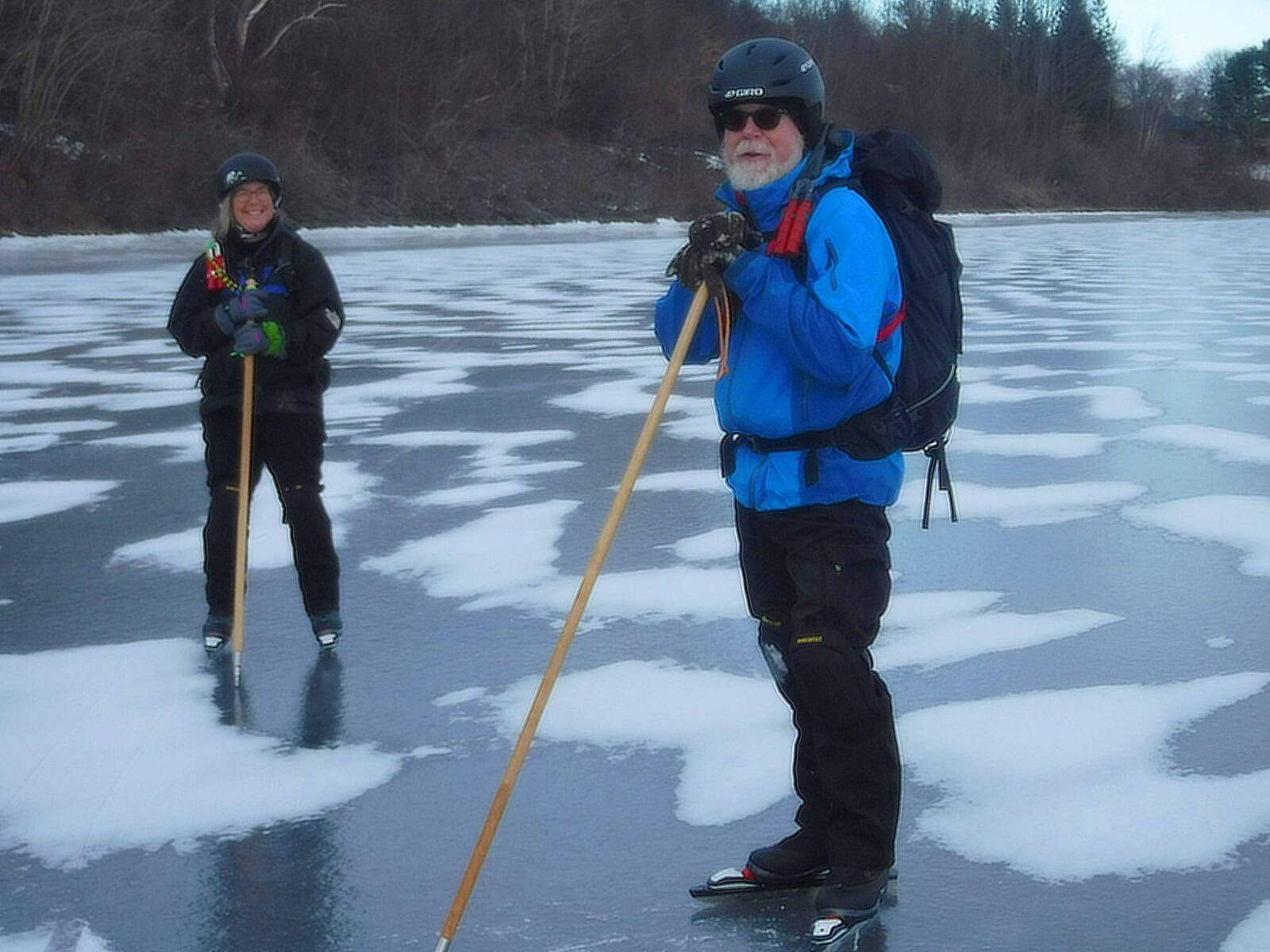
Nordic skaters with safety equipment for skating on "wild" ice

=== Skating season ===
In late autumn/early winter the small lakes freeze first, sometimes as early as October. Next the somewhat larger lakes freeze and become skateable. Light snow does not necessarily prevent skating and in some places tracks are ploughed to keep them open.

In January–February parts of the archipelago in the Baltic sea often freeze. This is the time when long skating tours can be undertaken. Tours of 60–80 km in one day are not uncommon - some skate over 150 km.

=== Associations ===
Sweden's largest tour skating association is "The Stockholm Ice Skate Sailing and Touring Club" (SSSK). Finland's largest tour skating association is Finland's Tour Skaters. America's largest tour skating association is Marathon Skating International, a Vermont-based skating group. Founded by Jamie Hess and a number of others, the organization was initially called, "North American Marathon Skating Association".

Several associations in Sweden, Finland, Norway, Netherlands, and the U.S. are members of Skridskonätet. Through Skridskonätet, the members of the various associations share information on where ice suitable for skating can be found. Skridskonätet also maintains a list of tour skating clubs in mainly Sweden, Finland and the Netherlands.

== Dutch (toer) skating ==
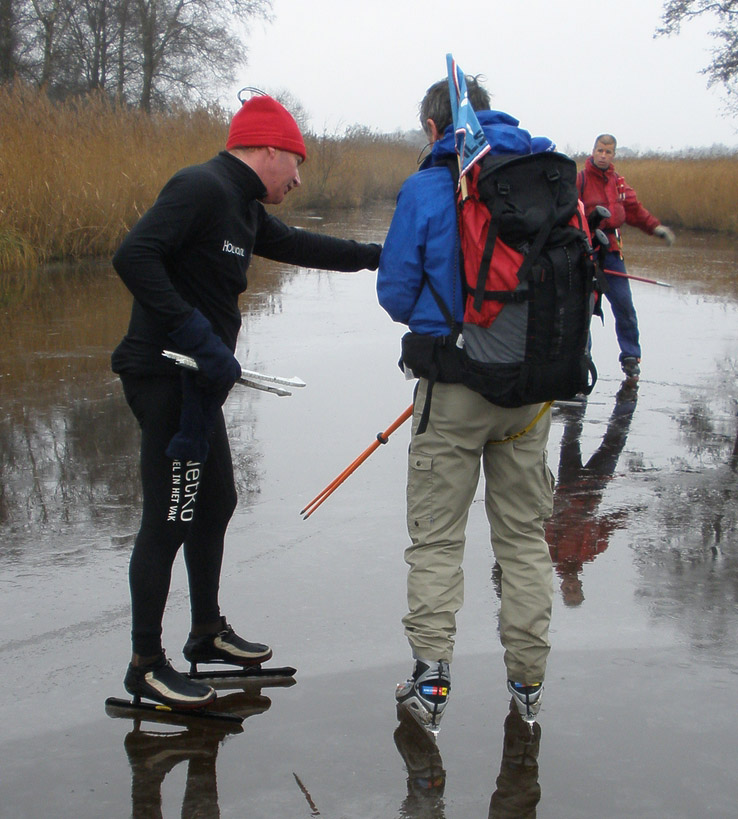
Two tour skating styles: Netherlands (left) and Nordic (right), on a canal in the Netherlands

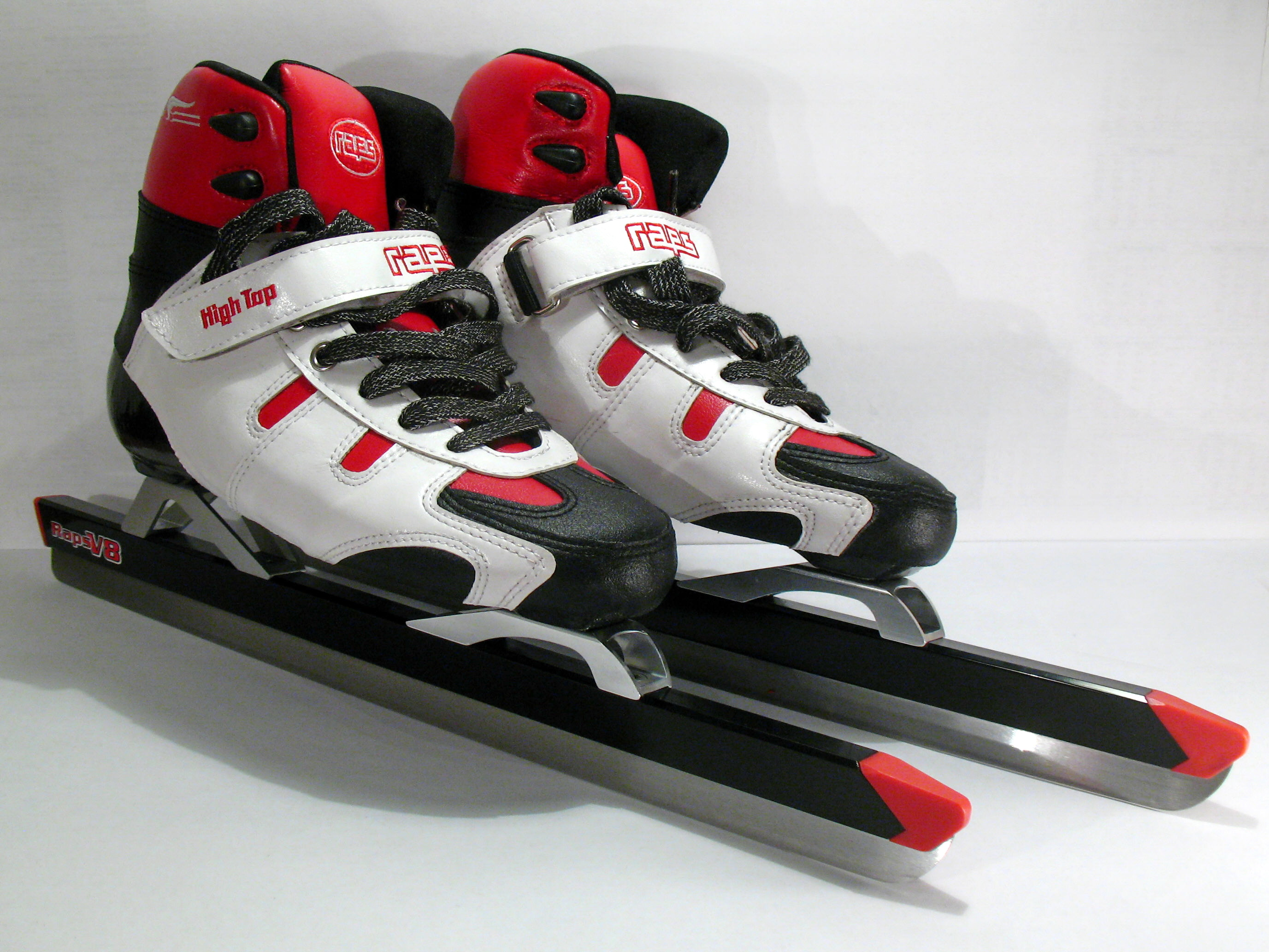
Modern Dutch tour skates

In the Netherlands, the Dutch skating is called Toerschaatsen, where skaters follow marked routes on frozen canals and lakes, which are coordinated by the Royal Netherlands Skating Union.

Despite its maritime climate in which real cold winters are rare, skating is traditionally the most popular winter pastime in the Netherlands even if many speed skating competitions have been moved indoors. Thousands of Dutch leap at the chance in cold winters to tie up their skates and glide across frozen lakes and canals, and sports stores all over the country sell out their skates.

=== Dutch equipment ===
The skaters mostly use common such skates with long blades or speed skates, with long blades rigidly attached to the skating shoes. Ice-poles and other safety equipment are not carried.

=== Dutch skating tracks ===
The Netherlands is home of Elfstedentocht, a 200 km distance skating race of which the tracks leads through the 11 different cities in Friesland which is a northern province of the Netherlands.

Skate tracks on natural ice are maintained by the towns and communities, who take care of the safety of the tracks.

== Outdoor skating in Canada ==
=== Overview ===
In Canada, outdoor skating on natural frozen lake and ponds is common but not as a method of travel or tourism, rather people skate in a circular route around the lake, or create an improvised ice hockey rink for a game of "shinny", ringette, or broomball.

However, starting in 1971, the section of the Rideau Canal that runs through the centre of Ottawa, the national capital, has been used as a skating corridor. This has become a major tourist attraction and a popular method of commuting in with Ottawa's locals. In 2011 932,331 people used the skateway. Starting in the 1990s The Forks area of Winnipeg, where two rivers join, has also been used as a skating trail, and by 2008 was longer than the Rideau skateway (though much narrower). Due to natural variations in ice conditions, the Nestaweya River Trail, as it is officially called, varies in length each year. Similar plans to turn Montreal's Lachine Canal into a skating venue have been discussed since 2000, but were still awaiting the needed funding in 2012.

In Joliette, Quebec, two parallel skating tracks, of 4 km each, on the L'Assomption River are linked to form a loop running through the center of the town.

In Invermere, British Columbia, there is a 15 km skating track on Windermere Lake.

=== List of woodland skating / ice-skating trails in Canada ===
- Arrowhead Provincial Park Ice Skating Trail (Huntsville, Ontario)
- Jasper Park Lodge Oval Trail (Lake Mildred, Alberta)
- Lac-des-Loups (Lac-des-Loups, Quebec)
- Lake Windermere Whiteway (Invermere, British Columbia)
- MacGregor Point Park Ice Skating Loop (Port Elgin, Ontario)
- Magog Skating Trail (Quebec, Lake Mephrémagog)
- Red River Mutual Trail (Winnipeg, Manitoba)
- Rideau Canal Skateway (Ottawa, Ontario)
- Shipyards Park Skating Loop (Whitehorse, Yukon)
- Skateway on the Rivière l'Assomption (Joliette, Quebec)
- Valens Conservation Area (Valens, Ontario)

=== Historical long distance skating in Canada ===
Long distance skating on lakes and rivers in eastern Canada and north-eastern US was more common in the years between 1850 and 1900. One region of note was the lower reaches of the Saint John River in New Brunswick. In Saint John: A Sporting Tradition, Brian Flood writes:

However, on the soles of the hearty ladies and gentlemen who lived along the St John and Kennebecasis Rivers, there was a different type of skate. They used the famous "Long Reachers". Around the year 1870, James A. Whelpley patented the "Long Reach Speed Skates". Whelpley's skate factory was located at Jones Creek, on the Long Reach. Here, he turned out skates that became famous all over the continent. The skate had a blade seventeen inches long. The "woods" of the skates, at the widest point, measured less than an inch and a half. A screw protruded up a half an inch at this point. The skates were firmly attached with heel and toe straps made of heavy leather.

"Long reachers" were ideally suited for the long expanse of the St John and Kennebecasis Rivers. A man on these skates could travel long distances in a relatively short period of time. From Saint John to Fredericton, by the way of the St John River, is a distance of about eighty miles. It was not uncommon for an able-bodied young man to skate this distance in a little under seven hours.

Some of the skaters from the Saint John River area became world class speed skating champions, notably Hugh J. McCormick.

== See also ==
- Touring skates
- Ice skating
