= Jackson Haines =

American figure skater (1838–1875)

- Photograph of Haines (c. 1865)

Personal information
- Born: October 4, 1838 New York City, New York, U.S.
- Died: June 23, 1875 (aged 36) Kokkola, Finland

Jackson Haines (1838–1875) was an American figure skater and roller skater who is regarded as the father of modern figure skating.

== Life ==
Haines was a trained ballet dancer. When he was a young man, he performed in skating exhibitions and on the variety stages. At this time, figure skating was performed in the "British Style", which was rigid and formal, unlike what is performed today. Haines's style was in complete contrast; he used his ballet background to create graceful programs, and introduced accompanying music, an innovation. He also screwed his figure skates directly onto his boots, which added stability and allowed him to do more athletic leaps and jumps. The common practice of the time was to strap the blades onto the boot, but direct attachments of skates based on the designs of the accomplished skater and author, "Captain" Robert Jones had been manufactured in London as early as 1772.

Haines left the United States via Boston during the height of the American Civil War. He went to Europe and gave ice and roller skating exhibitions in over a dozen countries. He performed before royalty and taught his style of skating, which later became known as the "International Style", in Scandinavia. He was particularly popular in Vienna, where he gave a number of exhibitions on both the ice and stage. Haines was also instrumental in the founding of the Wiener Eislaufverein (Wiener EV), one of the oldest and most active skating clubs in the world, and helped develop the Viennese style of figure skating.

Haines died of pneumonia in Gamlakarleby (nowadays in Finnish: Kokkola, in Swedish: Karleby), Finland on June 23, 1875.

Haines was inducted into the World Figure Skating Hall of Fame and the United States Figure Skating Hall of Fame in 1976.

== Legacy ==
Haines was the inventor of the sit spin, one of the three basic spin types. The other two are the upright spin, about as old as the art of ice skating itself; and the camel spin, invented during the twentieth century by Cecilia Colledge. His style did not become popular in the United States until many years after his death. The first U.S. Figure Skating Championships in the "International Style" were held on March 20, 1914, in New Haven, Connecticut.

== See also ==
- List of people considered father or mother of a field
