= Figure skating =

Ice sport performed on figure skates

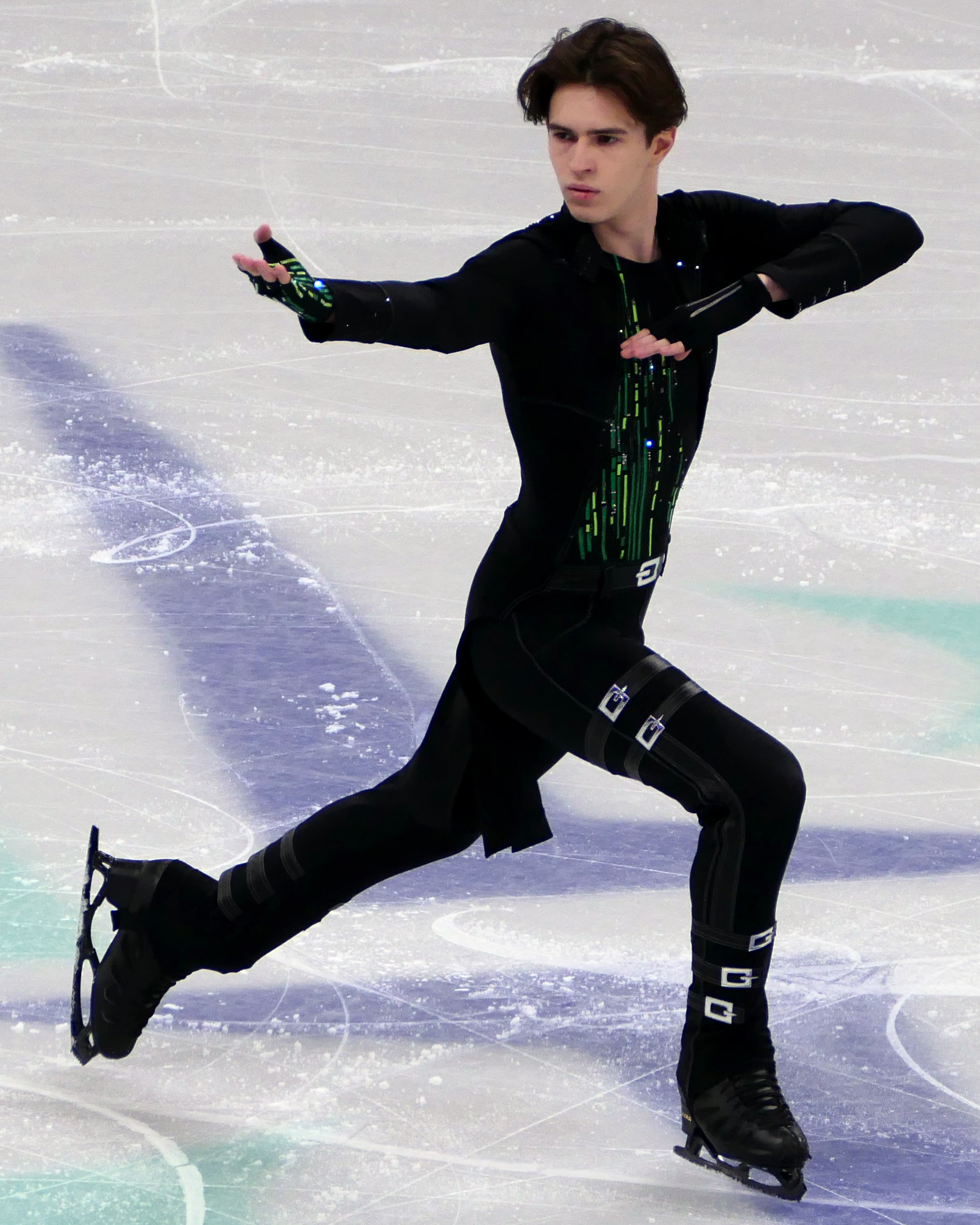
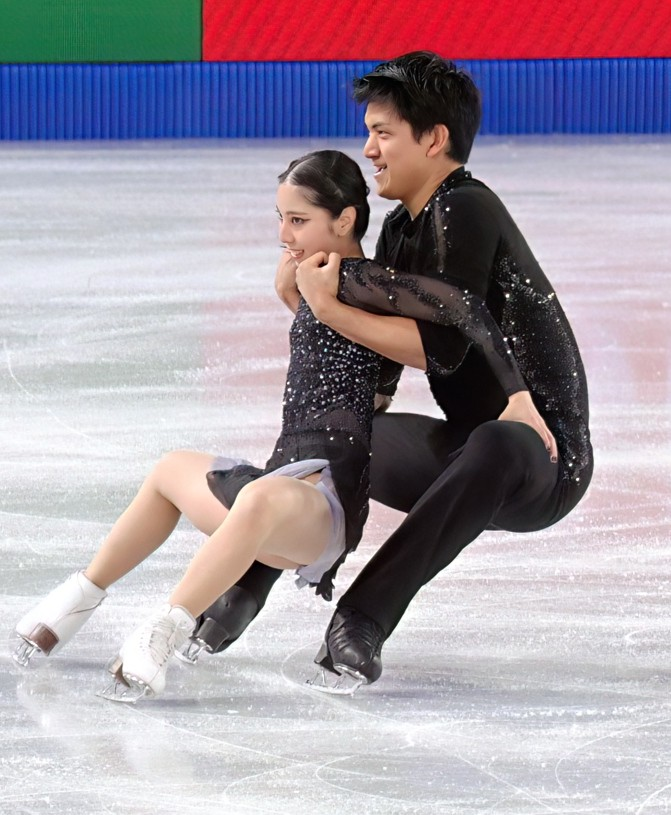
- Images of the four Olympic disciplines of figure skating (men's single skating, women's single skating, pair skating, and ice dance) as well as synchronized skating
- Highest governing body: International Skating Union
- Nicknames: Skating

Characteristics
- Team members: Individuals, duos, or groups
- Mixed-sex: Yes
- Equipment: Figure skates
- Glossary: Glossary of figure skating terms

Presence
- Olympic: Part of the Summer Olympics in 1908 and 1920; Part of the first Winter Olympics in 1924 to today

Figure skating is a sport in which individuals, pairs, or groups perform jumps, spins, and dance moves on ice. Their footwear are figure skates. It was the first winter sport to be included in the Olympic Games, with its introduction occurring at the 1908 Olympics in London. The Olympic disciplines are men's singles, women's singles, (Note: "Women" were referred to as "ladies" in ISU regulations and communications until the 2021–22 season.) pair skating, and ice dance; the four individual disciplines are also combined into a team event, which was first included in the Winter Olympics in 2014. The non-Olympic disciplines include synchronized skating, Theater on Ice, and four skating. From intermediate through senior-level competition, skaters generally perform two programs (the short program and the free skate), which, depending on the discipline, may include spins, jumps, moves in the field, lifts, throw jumps, death spirals, and other elements or moves.

Figure skaters compete at various levels from beginner up to the Olympic level (senior) at local, regional, sectional, national, and international competitions. The International Skating Union (ISU) regulates international figure skating judging and competitions. These include the Winter Olympics, the World Championships, the World Junior Championships, the European Championships, the Four Continents Championships, the Grand Prix series (senior and junior), and the ISU Challenger Series. Competition results can earn skaters/teams points towards the ISU World Standings and ISU Season's World Ranking.

The sport is also associated with show business. Major competitions generally conclude with exhibition galas, in which the top skaters from each discipline perform non-competitive programs. Many skaters, both during and after their competitive careers, also skate in ice shows, which run during the competitive season and the off-season.

== Terminology ==
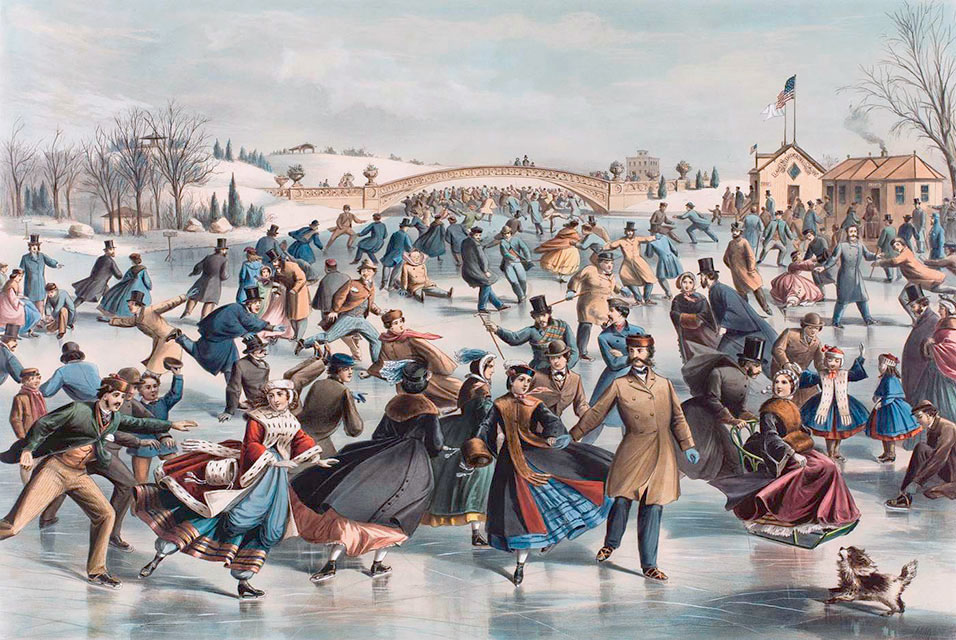
"Central Park, Winter: the Skating Pond", 1862 lithograph

The term "professional" in skating refers not to skill level but competitive status. Figure skaters competing at the highest levels of international competition are not "professional" skaters. They are sometimes referred to as amateurs, even though some earn money. Professional skaters include those who have lost their ISU eligibility and those who perform only in shows. They may also include former Olympic and World champions who have ended their competitive career, as well as skaters with little or no international competitive experience. In addition to performing in ice shows, professional skaters often compete in professional competitions, which are held throughout the world, each with its own format and rules.

The term "figure skating" is an English-language term; the sport is called Eiskunstlauf (lit. "Ice Art Run") in German and patinage artistique (lit. "artistic skating") in French.

== Figure skates ==
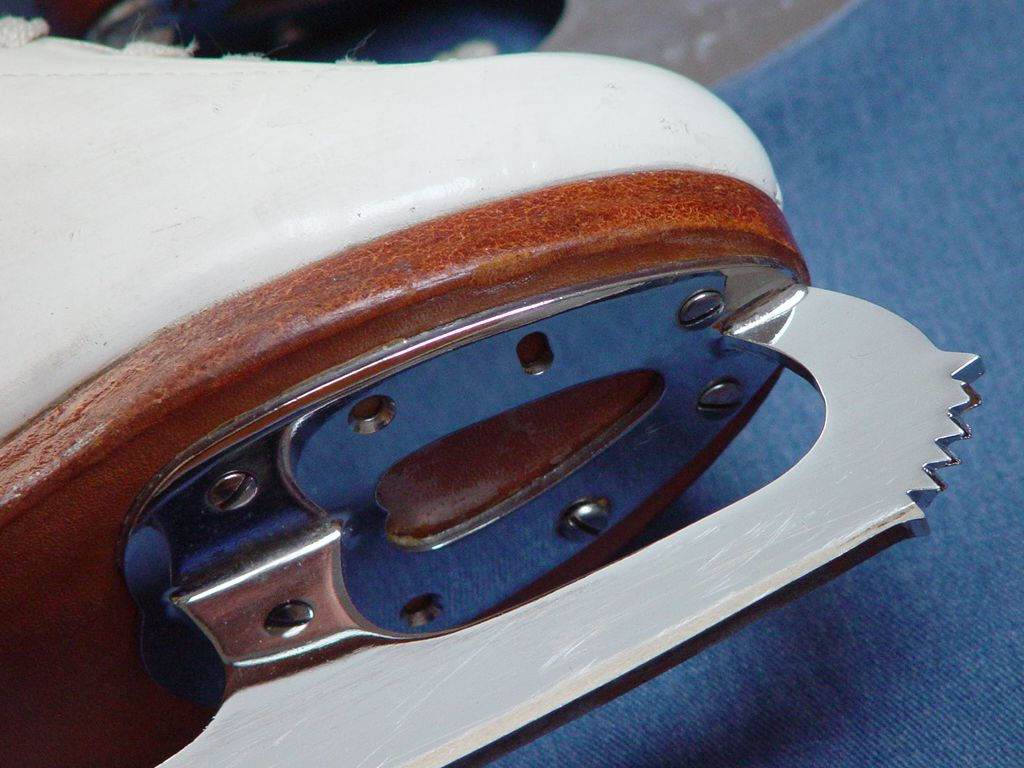
Close-up of a figure skating blade, showing the toe picks, the hollow (groove) on the bottom of the blade, and screw attachment

The most visible difference from ice hockey skates is that figure skates have a set of large, jagged teeth called toe picks on the front part of the blade. These are used primarily in jumping and should not be used for stroking or spins. If used during a spin, the toe pick will cause the skater to lose momentum, or move away from the center of the spin. Blades are mounted to the sole and heel of the boot with screws. Typically, high-level figure skaters are professionally fitted for their boots and blades at a reputable skate shop. Professionals are also employed to sharpen blades to individual requirements.

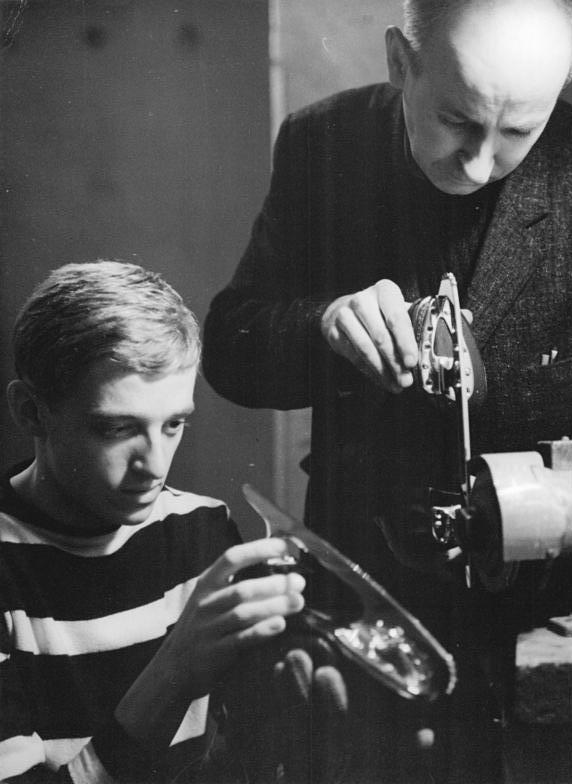
Blade sharpening

Figure skates and edges

Blades are about 4.7 millimetres (3/16 inch) thick. When viewed from the side, the blade of a figure skate is not flat, but curved slightly, forming an arc of a circle with a radius of 180–220 centimetres (71–87 inches). This curvature is referred to as the rocker of the blade. The "sweet spot" is the part of the blade on which all spins are rotated; this is usually located near the stanchion of the blade, below the ball of the foot. The blade is also "hollow ground"; a groove on the bottom of the blade creates two distinct edges, inside and outside. The inside edge of the blade is on the side closest to the skater; the outside edge of the blade is on the side farthest from the skater. In figure skating, it is always desirable to skate on only one edge of the blade. Skating on both at the same time (which is referred to as a flat) may result in lower skating skills scores. The apparently effortless power and glide across the ice exhibited by elite figure skaters fundamentally derives from efficient use of the edges to generate speed.

Skates used in singles and pair skating have a set of large, jagged teeth called a toepick on the front of each blade. The toepicks are mainly used to help launch the skater into the air for the take-off when performing jumps. Ice dance blades have smaller toepicks than blades used for the other disciplines.

During a spin, skaters use the sweet spot of the blade, which is one of two rockers to be found on a blade and is the roundest portion of the blade. The sweet spot is located just behind the toe pick and near the middle of the blade. The other rocker is the more general curvature of the blade when stroking or gliding.

Ice dancers' blades are about an inch shorter in the rear than those used by skaters in other disciplines, to accommodate the intricate footwork and close partnering in dance. Dancers' blades also have a smaller toepick as they do not require the large toepick used for jumping in the other disciplines. Hard plastic skate guards are used when the skater must walk in his or her skates when not on the ice, to protect the blade from dirt or material on the ground that may dull the blade. Soft blade covers called soakers are used to absorb condensation and protect the blades from rust when the skates are not being worn. In competition, skaters are allowed three minutes to make repairs to their skates.

There are many different types of boots and blades to suit different disciplines and abilities. For example, athletes who are performing advanced multi-rotational jumps often need a stiffer boot that is higher and gives more support. Athletes working on single or double jumps require less support and may use a less stiff boot. Ice dancers may prefer a lower cut boot that is designed to enable more knee bend.

Likewise, blades designed for free and pairs skating have a longer tail to assist landing. The blade profile and picks are designed to assist with spinning, jump entry, take-off, landing, and exit. Modern blade technology increasingly uses carbon fibre and materials other than steel to make blades lighter. These materials may also be more flexible and help cushion jump landings and be protective of young athletes' joints. Ice dance blades have short tails to enable close foot work and reduce the risk of blade clash in close complex moves. They may also be thinner to assist with glide and fast changes of edge.

Off-ice training is the term for physical conditioning that takes place off the ice. Besides regular physical exercise, skaters do walk-throughs of jumps off the ice to practice sufficient rotation and height of their jumps, and to practice consistency in landing on one foot. In 2020/2021 many athletes relied on a variety of off-ice training and conditioning methods due to rinks being closed due to COVID-19.

== Ice rinks and rink equipment ==
Since 1980, all figure skating competitions must be held in completely covered and enclosed rinks. The rule was expanded to include practice rinks in 1984. According to figure skating historian James R. Hines, the development of indoor ice rinks, other than the development of the bladed skate during the 14th century and the practice of fastening boots permanently to skates in the 19th century, has had the greatest effect on figure skating. It allowed for skating year-round, as well as anywhere in the world, and prevented the cancellation of competitive events due to the lack of ice in outdoor rinks. The first attempts to make artificial ice occurred during the 1870s in England and the U.S. The first notable indoor ice rink was made in 1876, by John Gamgee, in Chelsea along the north bank of the Thames River; it measured 24 by 40 feet. By the end of the 19th century, many major cities in Europe and North America had indoor rinks.

There is significant variation in the dimensions of ice rinks. Olympic-sized rinks have dimensions of 30 m × 60 m (98.4 ft × 197 ft), NHL-sized rinks are 26 m × 61 m (85 ft × 200 ft), while European rinks are sometimes 30 m × 64 m (98 ft × 210 ft). The ISU prefers Olympic-sized rinks for figure skating competitions, particularly for major events. According to ISU rule 342, a figure skating rink for an ISU event "if possible, shall measure sixty (60) meters in one direction and thirty (30) meters in the other, but not larger, and not less than fifty-six (56) meters in one direction and twenty-six (26) meters in the other." The scoring system rewards skaters who have good ice coverage, i.e. those who efficiently cover the entire ice surface during their programs. Olympic-sized rinks make the differences in skill between skaters more apparent but they are not available for all events. If a rink has different dimensions, a skater's jump setup and speed may be hindered as he or she adjusts.

Ice quality is judged by smoothness, friction, hardness, and brittleness. Factors affecting ice quality include temperature, water quality, and usage, with toe picks causing more deterioration. For figure skating, the ice surface temperature is normally maintained between −5.5 and −3.5 °C (22.1 and 25.7 °F), with the Olympic disciplines requiring slightly softer ice (−3.5 °C) than synchronized skating (−5.5 °C). Typically after every two warm-up groups, an ice resurfacer cleans and smooths the surface of the ice sheet. Inadequate ice quality may affect skaters' performances.

Some rinks have a harness system installed to help skaters learn new jumps in a controlled manner. A heavy-duty cable is securely attached to two of the walls around the ice, with a set of pulleys riding on the cable. The skater wears a vest or belt, with a cable or rope attached to it, and the cable/rope is threaded through the movable pulley on the cable above. The coach holds the other end of the cable and lifts the skater by pulling the cable/rope. The skater can then practice the jump with the coach assisting the completion. This is used when a skater needs more help on a jump. However, if the coaches see fit, they could use another harness usually called "the fishing pole harness." It is named that because it looks similar to a fishing pole. The skater will put on the harness and the coach will adjust it so it fits the skater. The skater will go and do the jump with very little help from their coach. They can also do the jump on any pattern they choose, whereas, the other harness, they must do in a straight line.

== Disciplines ==
Figure skating consists of the following disciplines:

- In single skating, male and female skaters compete individually. Figure skating is the oldest winter sport contested at the Olympics, with men's and women's single skating appearing as two of the four figure skating events at the London Games in 1908. Single skating has required elements that skaters must perform during a competition and that make up a well-balanced skating program. They include jumps (and jump combinations), spins, step sequences, and choreographic sequences.
- Pair skating is defined as "the skating of two persons in unison who perform their movements in such harmony with each other as to give the impression of genuine Pair Skating as compared with independent Single Skating". The ISU also states that a pairs team consists of "one Woman and one Man". Pair skating, along with men's and women's single skating, has been an Olympic discipline since figure skating, the oldest Winter Olympic sport, was introduced at the 1908 Summer Olympics in London. The ISU World Figure Skating Championships introduced pair skating in 1908. Pair skating required elements include lifts, twist lifts, jumps and partner assisted jumps, pair spins, death spirals, step sequences, and choreographic sequences. The elements performed by pairs teams must be "linked together by connecting steps of a different nature" and by other comparable movements and with a variety of holds and positions.
- Ice dance historically draws from ballroom dancing. It joined the World Figure Skating Championships in 1952, and became a Winter Olympic Games medal sport in 1976. According to the ISU, an ice dance team consists of one woman and one man. Ice dance has its roots in the "combined skating" developed in the 19th century by skating clubs and organizations and in recreational social skating. The first national competitions occurred in England, Canada, the U.S., and Austria during the 1930s. The first international ice dance competition took place as a special event at the World Championships in 1950 in London. The elements ice dance teams must perform are the dance lift, the dance spin, the step sequence, twizzles, and choreographic elements.
- Synchronized skating (formerly known as "precision skating") is for mixed-gender groups of between twelve and twenty figure skaters. This discipline resembles a group form of ice dance, with additional emphasis on precise formations of the group as a whole and complex transitions between formations. The basic formations include wheels, blocks, lines, circles, and intersections. The close formations, and the need for the team to stay in unison, add to the difficulty of the footwork performed by the skaters in these elements. Formal proposals were put forward by the ISU to include synchronized skating in the 2022 Winter Olympics, but those efforts have been unsuccessful.
- Compulsory figures or school figures were formerly a discipline of figure skating, and gave the sport its name. They are the "circular patterns which skaters trace on the ice to demonstrate skill in placing clean turns evenly on round circles". For approximately the first 50 years of figure skating as a sport, until 1947, compulsory figures made up 60 percent of the total score at most competitions around the world. These figures continued to dominate the sport, although they steadily declined in importance, until the ISU voted to discontinue them as a part of competitions in 1990. Since 2015 with the founding of the World Figure Sport Society and the World Figure & Fancy Skating Championships & Festival on black ice, more skaters are training and competing in figures. More coaches are learning the new methods developed by World Figure Sport to teach them to skaters, as some skaters and coaches believe that figures give skaters an advantage in developing alignment, core strength, body control, and discipline.
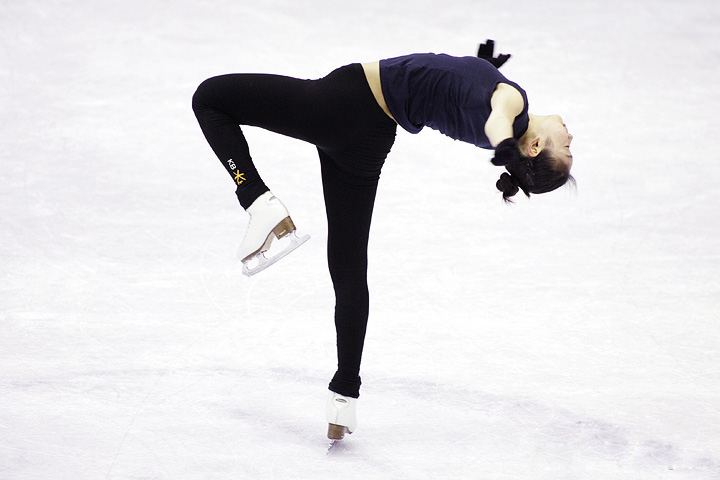
South Korean singles skater Yuna Kim, 2008

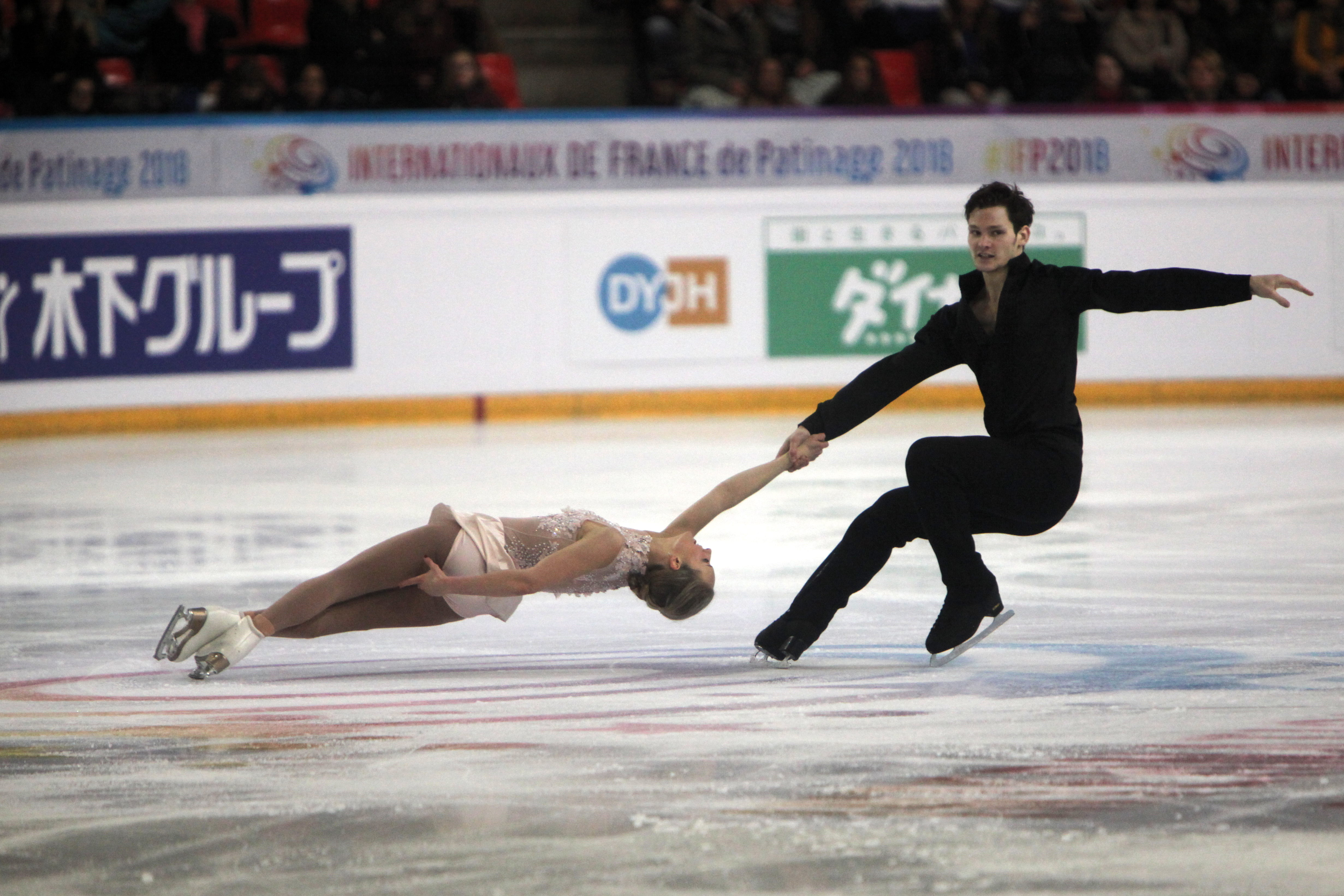
Canadian pair skaters Camille Ruest and Andrew Wolfe, 2018

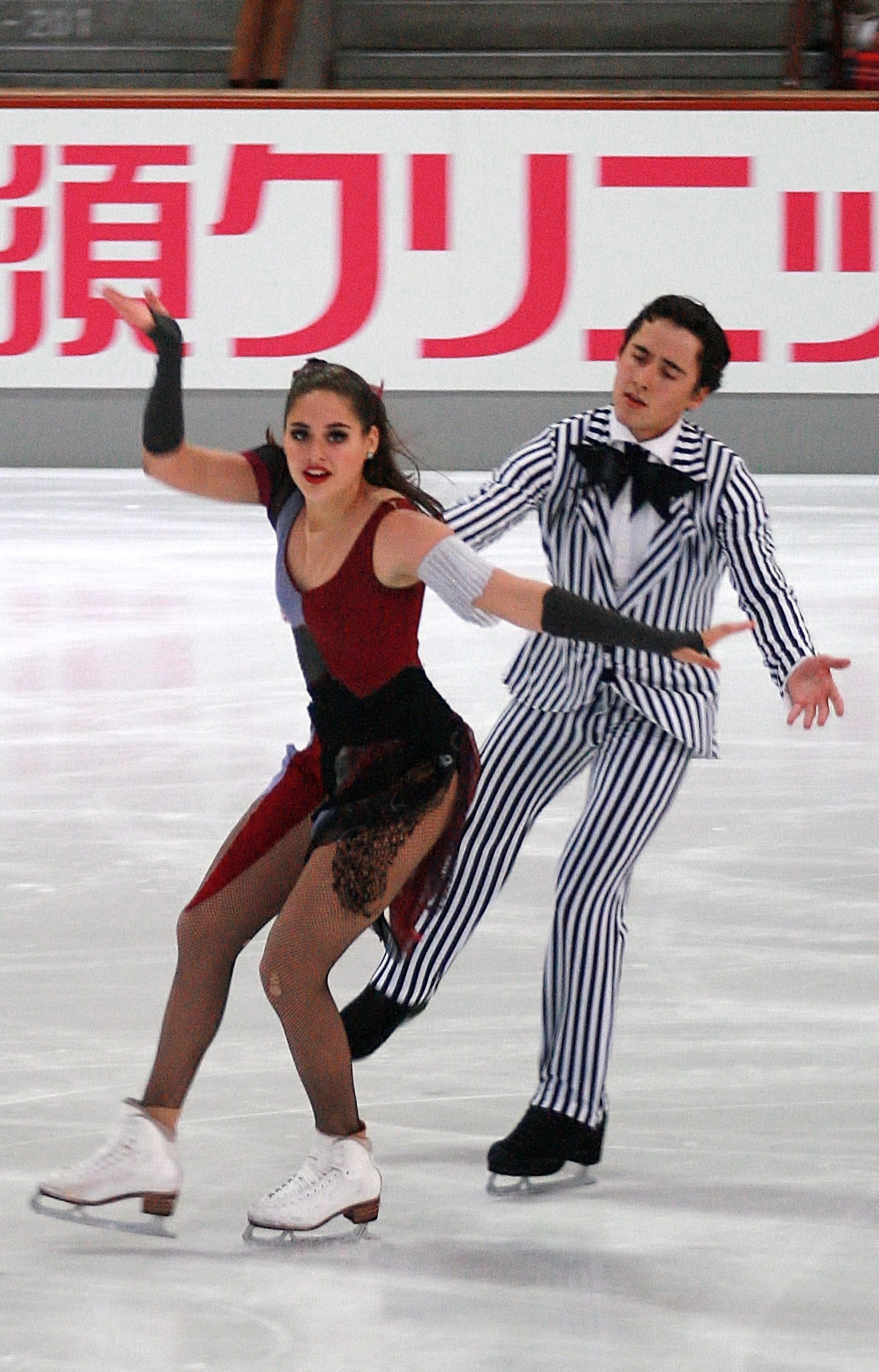
Mexican ice dancers Pilar Maekawa Moreno and Leonardo Maekawa Moreno, 2013

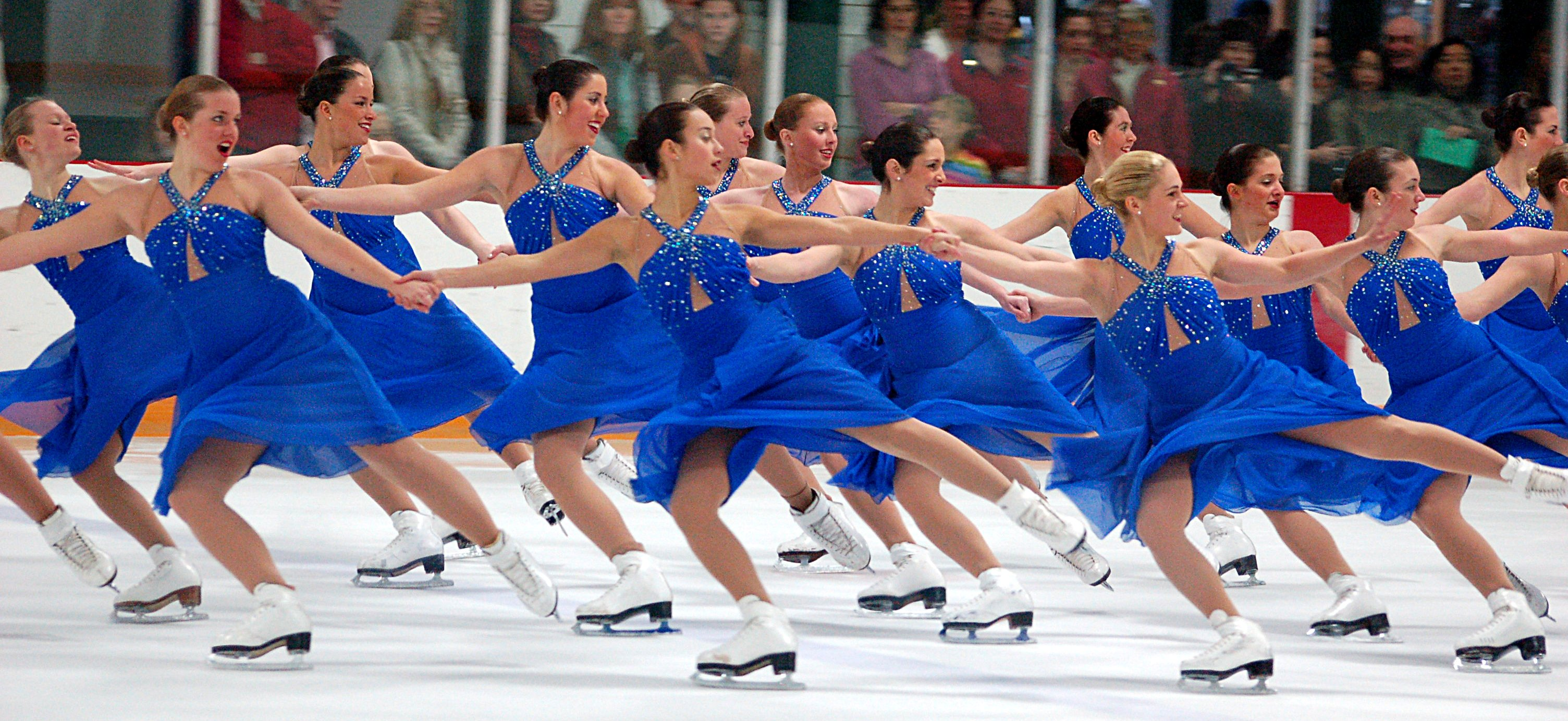
American synchronized skating team The Haydenettes, 2006

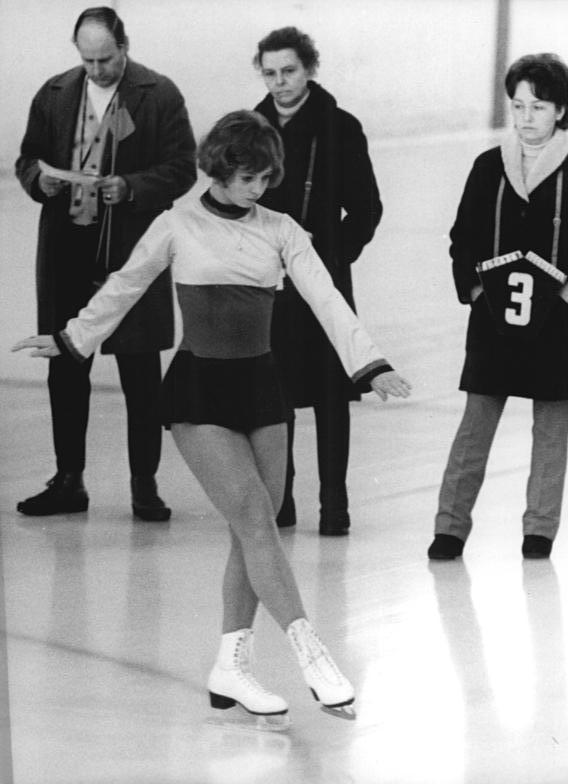
Sonja Morgenstern from Germany demonstrating compulsory figures, 1971

== Elements and moves ==
Each element receives a score according to its base value and grade of execution (GOE), resulting in a combined technical elements score (TES). At competitions, a technical specialist identifies the elements and assigns each one a level of difficulty, ranging from B (Basic) to Level 4 (most difficult). For each element, a panel of judges determines the GOE, ranging between −5 and +5, according to how well the skater executes the element. The GOE is weighted according to the base value of the element. Through the ISU guidelines skaters must perform a minimum of seven elements in their short program and twelve elements in their long program.

The ISU defines a fall as a loss of control with the result that the majority of the skater's body weight is not on the blade but supported by hands, knees, or buttocks.

=== Jumps ===
ISU abbreviations: Jumps
T	Toe loop
S	Salchow
Lo	Loop
F	Flip
Lz	Lutz
A	Axel

Jumps involve the skater leaping into the air and rotating rapidly to land after completing one or more rotations. There are many types of jumps, identified by the way the skater takes off and lands, as well as by the number of rotations that are completed.

Each jump receives a score according to its base value and grade of execution (GOE). Quality of execution, technique, height, speed, flow and ice coverage are considered by the judges. An under-rotated jump (indicated by < ) is "missing rotation of more than 1/4, but less than 1/2 revolution" and receives 70% of the base value. A downgraded jump (indicated by << ) is "missing rotation of 1/2 revolution or more". A downgraded triple is treated as a double jump, while a downgraded double is treated as a single jump.

An edge violation occurs when a skater executes a jump on the incorrect edge. The hollow is a groove on the bottom of the blade which creates two distinct edges, inside and outside. The inside edge of the blade is on the side closest to the skater, the outside edge is on the side farthest from the skater, and a flat refers to skating on both edges at the same time, which is discouraged. An unclear edge or edge violation is indicated with an 'e' and reflected in the GOE according to the severity of the problem. Flutz and lip are the colloquial terms for a Lutz and flip jump with an edge violation.

In 1982, the ISU enacted a rule stating that a skater may perform each type of triple only once in a program, or twice if one of them is incorporated into a combination or sequence. For a set of jumps to be considered a combination, each jump must take off from the landing edge of the previous jump, with no steps, turns, or change of edge between jumps. Toe loops and loops are commonly performed as the second or third jump in a combination because they take off from the back outside edge of the landing foot, or skating leg. To perform a salchow or flip on the back end of a combination, a half loop (which is actually a full rotation, but lands on a back inside edge of the landing leg) may be used as a connecting jump. In contrast, jump sequences are sets of jumps that may be linked by non-listed jumps or hops. Sequences are worth 80% of the combined value of the same jumps executed in combination.

Video demonstrating basic figure skating jumps

A figure skater only needs to be able to jump in one direction, either clockwise or counter-clockwise. The vast majority of figure skaters prefer to rotate in a counter-clockwise direction when jumping. Thus, for clarity, all jumps will be described for a skater jumping counter-clockwise.

There are six jumps in figure skating that count as jump elements. All six are landed on one foot on the back outside edge (with counter-clockwise rotation, for single and multi-revolution jumps), but have different takeoffs, by which they may be distinguished. Jumps are divided into two different categories: toe jumps and edge jumps.

The number of rotations performed in the air determines whether the jump is a single, double, triple, or quadruple (commonly known as a "quad"). The simplest jump is a waltz jump, which can only be done in a half-leap and is not classified as a single, double, or triple jump. Triple jumps, other than the triple Axel, are commonly performed by female single skaters. It is rare for a female skater to land a quadruple jump, and very few female single skaters have been credited with quads in competition. Senior-level male single skaters perform mostly triple and quadruple jumps in competition. The final of the six jumps to be landed cleanly as a quad in international competition is the elusive quadruple Axel. A few male skaters made valiant efforts to land the immensely difficult four-and-a-half revolution jump (most notably two-time Olympic Champion from Japan, Yuzuru Hanyu), but failed to land one cleanly and fully-rotated. The first clean and fully-rotated quad Axel was successfully landed by American men's skater Ilia Malinin at the 2022 CS U.S. Classic, 34 years after the first-ever quadruple jump (a quad toe loop) was landed by Canada's Kurt Browning at the World Figure Skating Championships in 1988.

The takeoff speed of a jump can reach up to 25 kilometers per hour. Prior to most jumps, a figure skater needs to skate backward to build power and speed.

==== Toe jumps ====
Toe jumps are launched by digging the toe pick of one skate into the ice, using it to vault into the air with the opposite leg. The main toe jumps are (in order of score value):

1. Toe loop – the skater takes off backwards from the outside edge of the right (or left) foot, launching the jump using the opposite toe pick.
2. Flip (sometimes known as a toe salchow) – the skater takes off backwards from the inside edge of the left (or right) foot and assists the take-off using the opposite toe pick.
3. Lutz – similar to the flip, but the skater takes off from the backward outside edge of the left (or right) foot, launching the jump using the opposite toe pick.

All of the above descriptions assume a counter-clockwise direction of rotation, landing backwards on the outside edge of the right foot. (For clockwise rotation, the skater takes off using the alternative foot and lands backwards on the outside edge of the left foot.)

==== Edge jumps ====
An Axel jump

Edge jumps use no toe assist, and include (in order of score value):

1. Salchow – the skater takes off backwards from the inside edge of the left (or right) foot, allowing the edge to come round, the opposite leg helps to launch the jump into the air.
2. Loop (also known as a Rittberger jump) – the skater takes off backwards from the outside edge of the right (or left) foot.
3. Axel – the skater takes off forwards from the outside edge of the left (or right) foot. As this is the only rotating jump to take off from a forward edge, it includes an extra half rotation.

Again, these descriptions assume a counter-clockwise direction of rotation, landing backwards on the outside edge of the right foot. (For clockwise rotation, the skater takes off using the alternative foot and always lands backwards on the outside edge of the left foot.)

==== Other jumps ====
Several other jumps are usually performed only as single jumps and in elite skating are used as transitional movements or highlights in step sequences. These include the half toe loop (ballet jump), half loop, half flip, walley jump, waltz jump, inside Axel, one-foot Axel, stag jump, and split jump. There are two kinds of split jump:

- Russian split, performed in a position that is similar to that of a straddle split
- front split, performed in the position of the more traditional split, facing the direction of the front leg
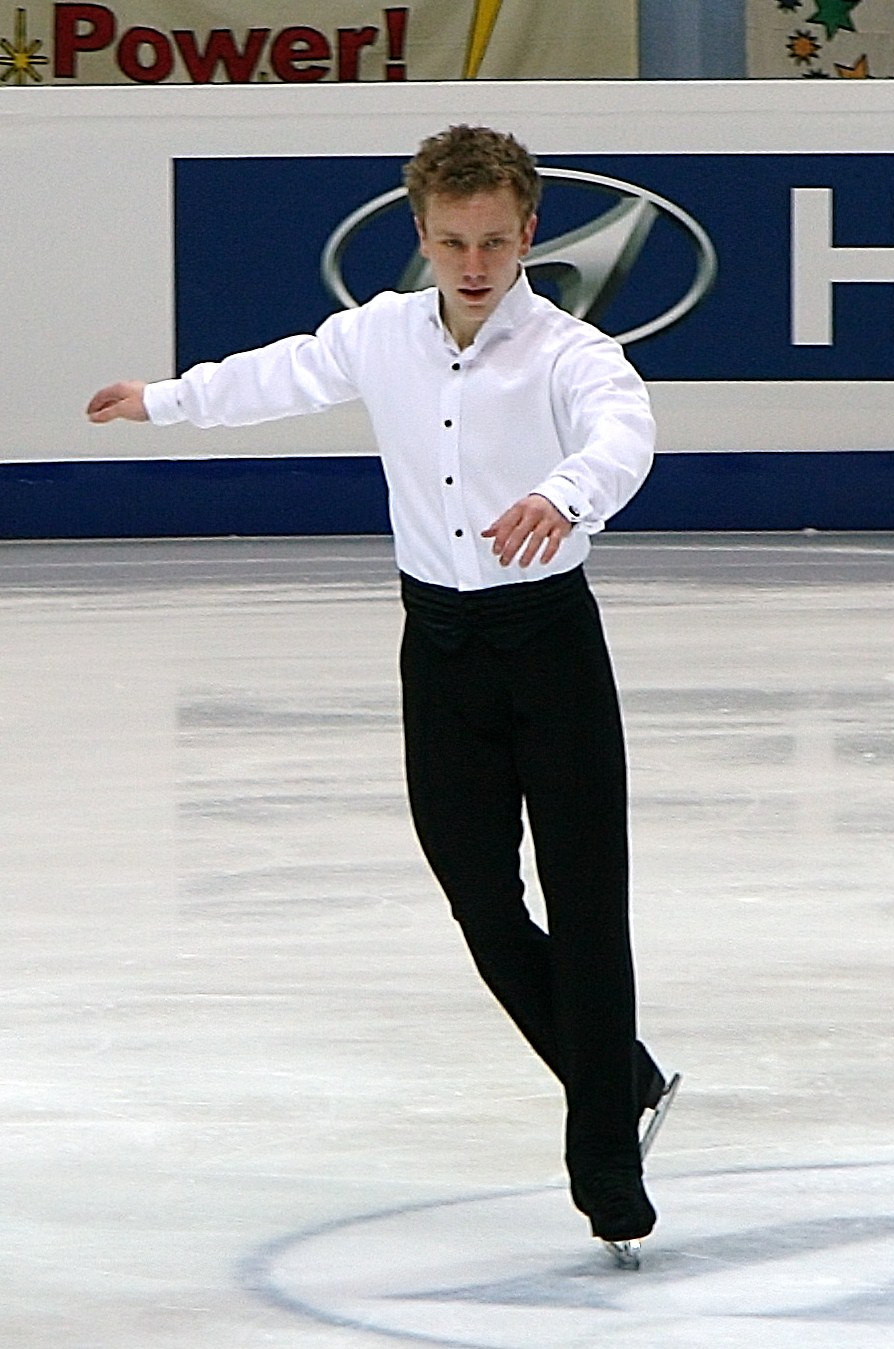
Ross Miner sets up for a jump.

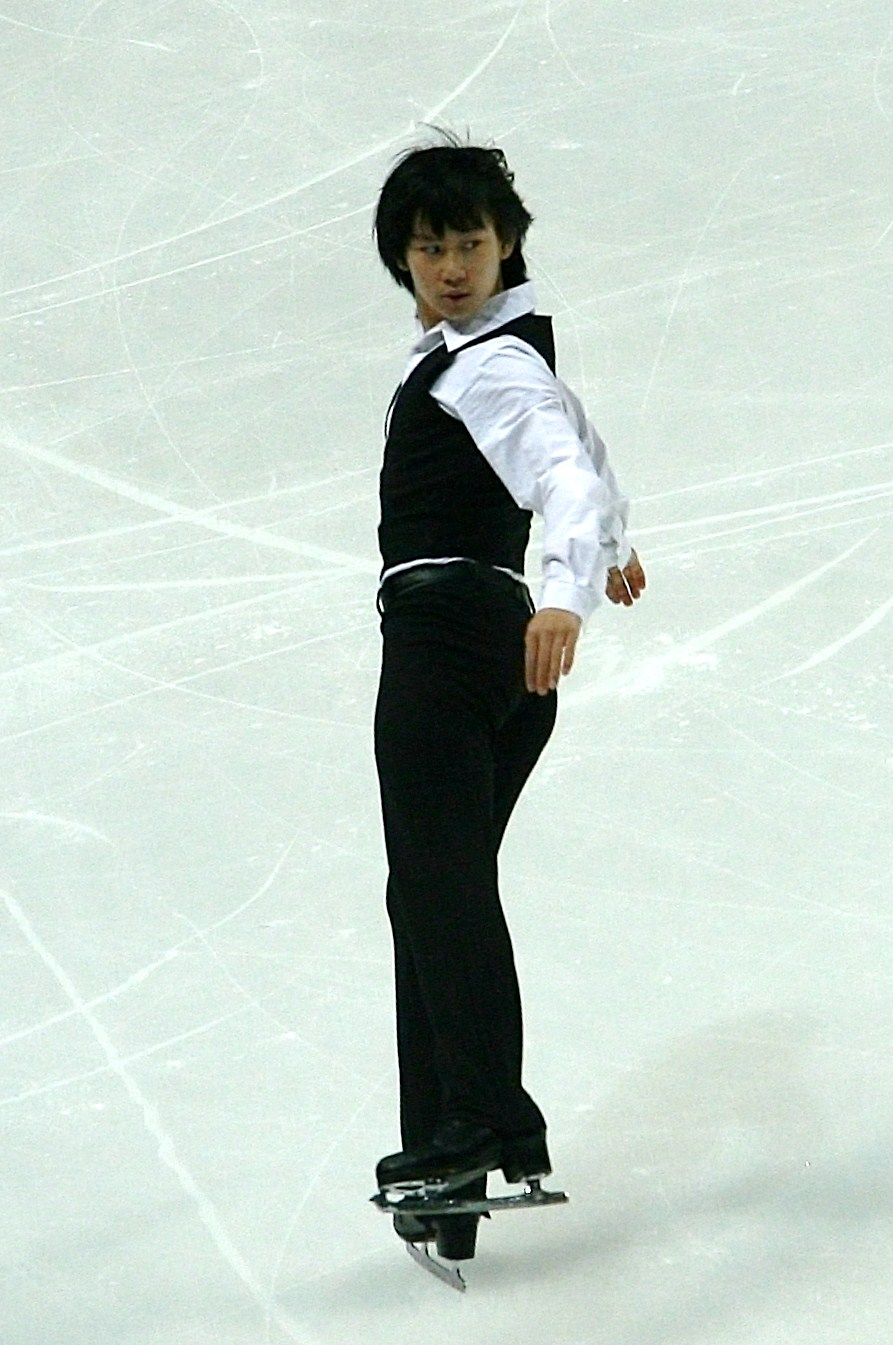
Denis Ten sets up for a jump.

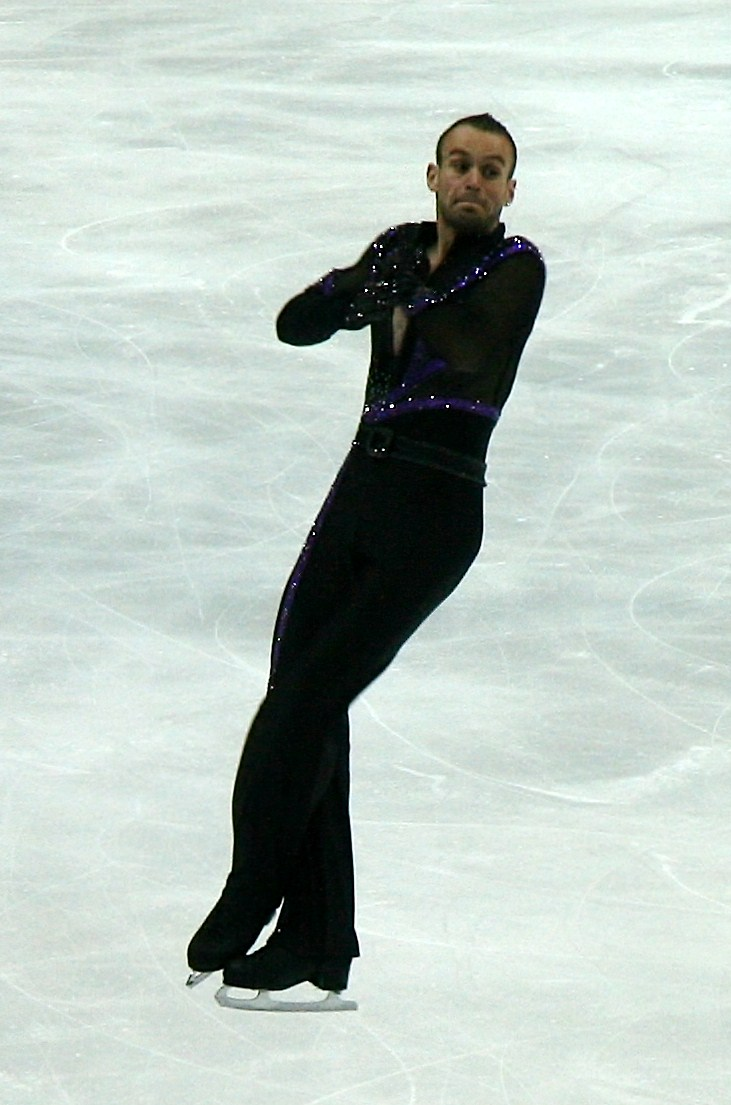
Kevin van der Perren rotates in the air.

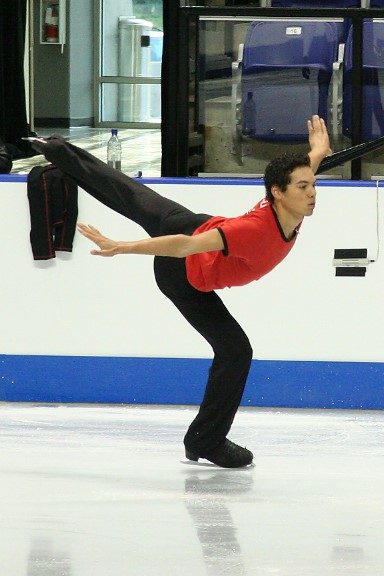
Jamal Othman lands on the right back outside edge.
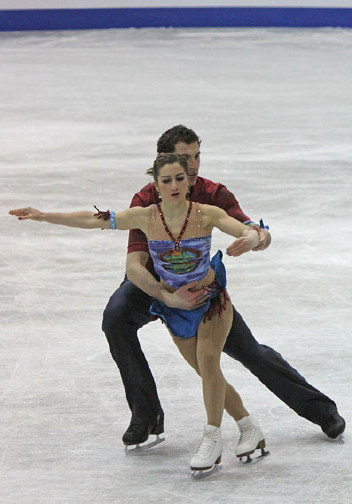
Pairs skaters Marissa Castelli and Simon Shnapir set up for a throw jump.

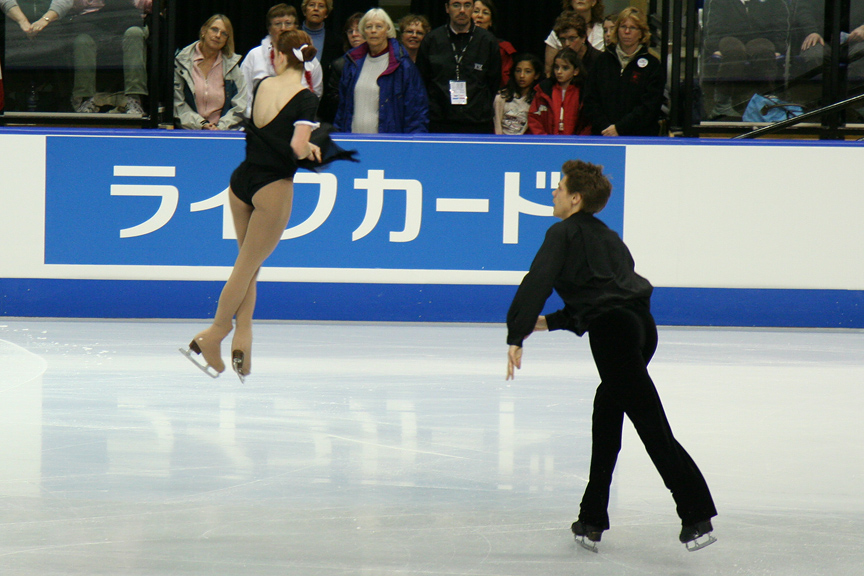
A pair team after the woman has been thrown: Jessica Miller rotates in the air.

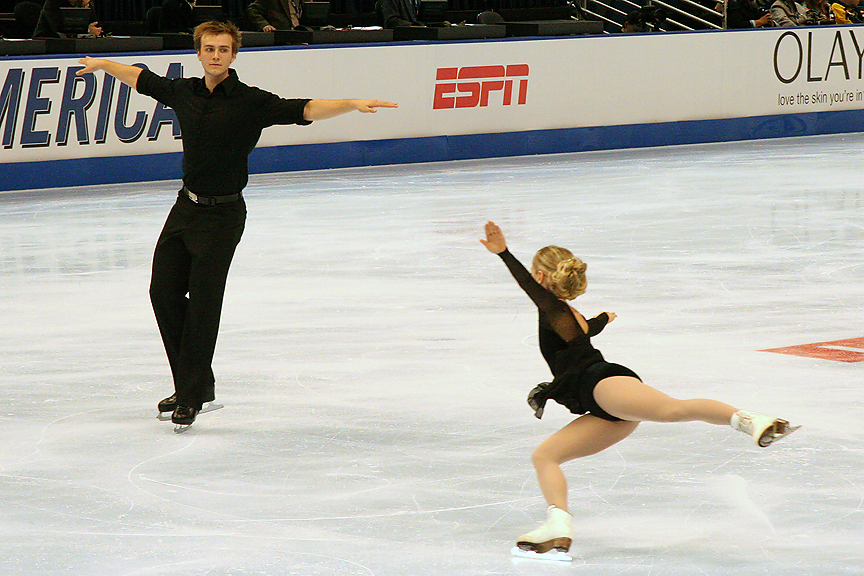
Anabelle Langlois lands after performing a throw jump with Cody Hay.

=== Spins ===
Spins are an element in which the skater rotates, centered on a single point on the ice, while holding one or more body positions. They are performed by all disciplines of the sport. As The New York Times says, "While jumps look like sport, spins look more like art. While jumps provide the suspense, spins provide the scenery, but there is so much more to the scenery than most viewers have time or means to grasp". According to world champion and figure skating commentator Scott Hamilton, spins are often used "as breathing points or transitions to bigger things"

Figure skating spins, along with jumps, spirals, and spread eagles were originally individual compulsory figures, sometimes special figures. Unlike jumps, spins were a "graceful and appreciated" part of figure skating throughout the 19th century. They advanced between World War I and World War II; by the late 1930s, all three basic spin positions were used.

There are two types of spins, the forward spin and the backward spin. There are three basic spin positions: the upright spin, the sit spin, and the camel spin. Skaters also perform flying spins and combination spins.

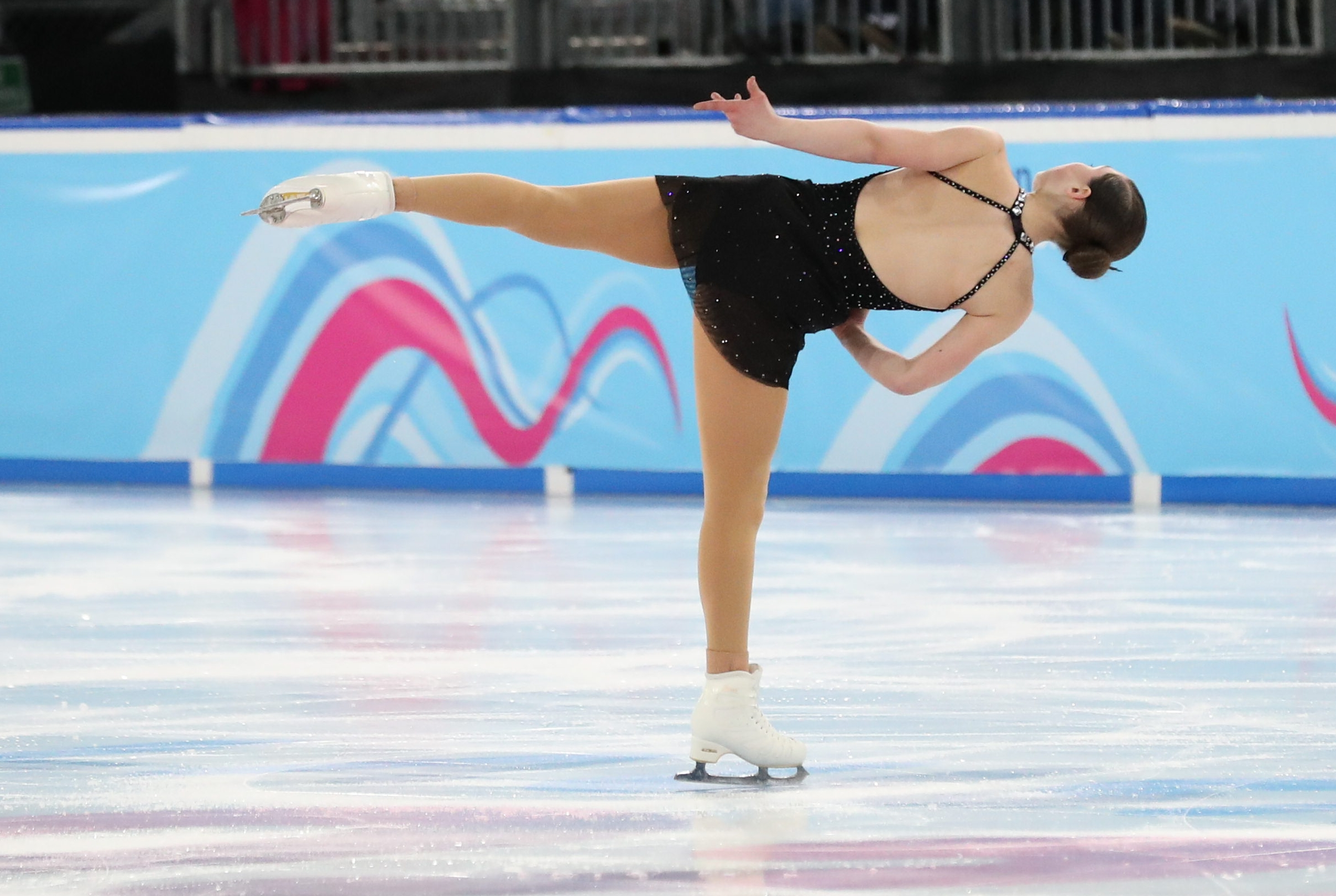
Camel spin

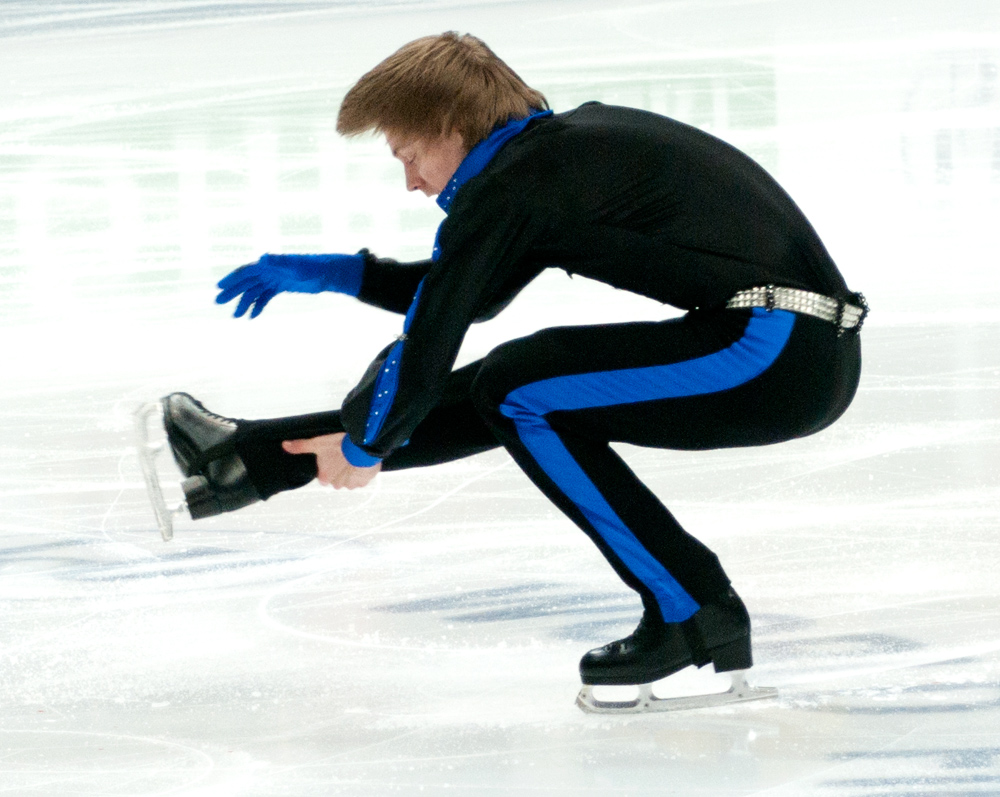
Sit spin

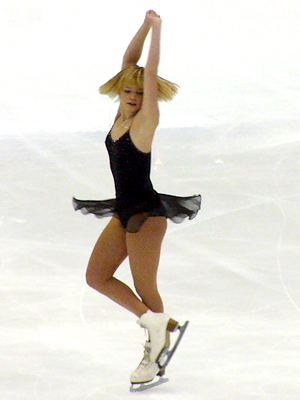
Upright spin

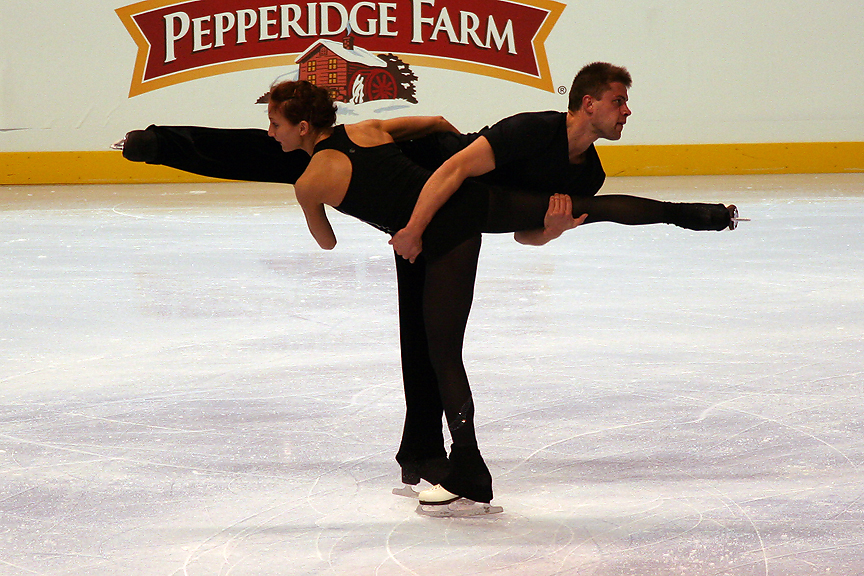
Pair camel spin

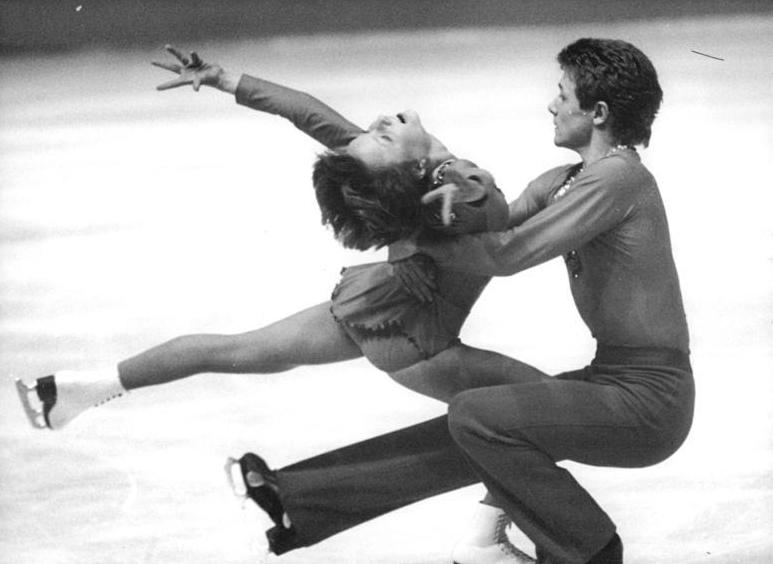
Pair spin with woman in layback and man in sit spin

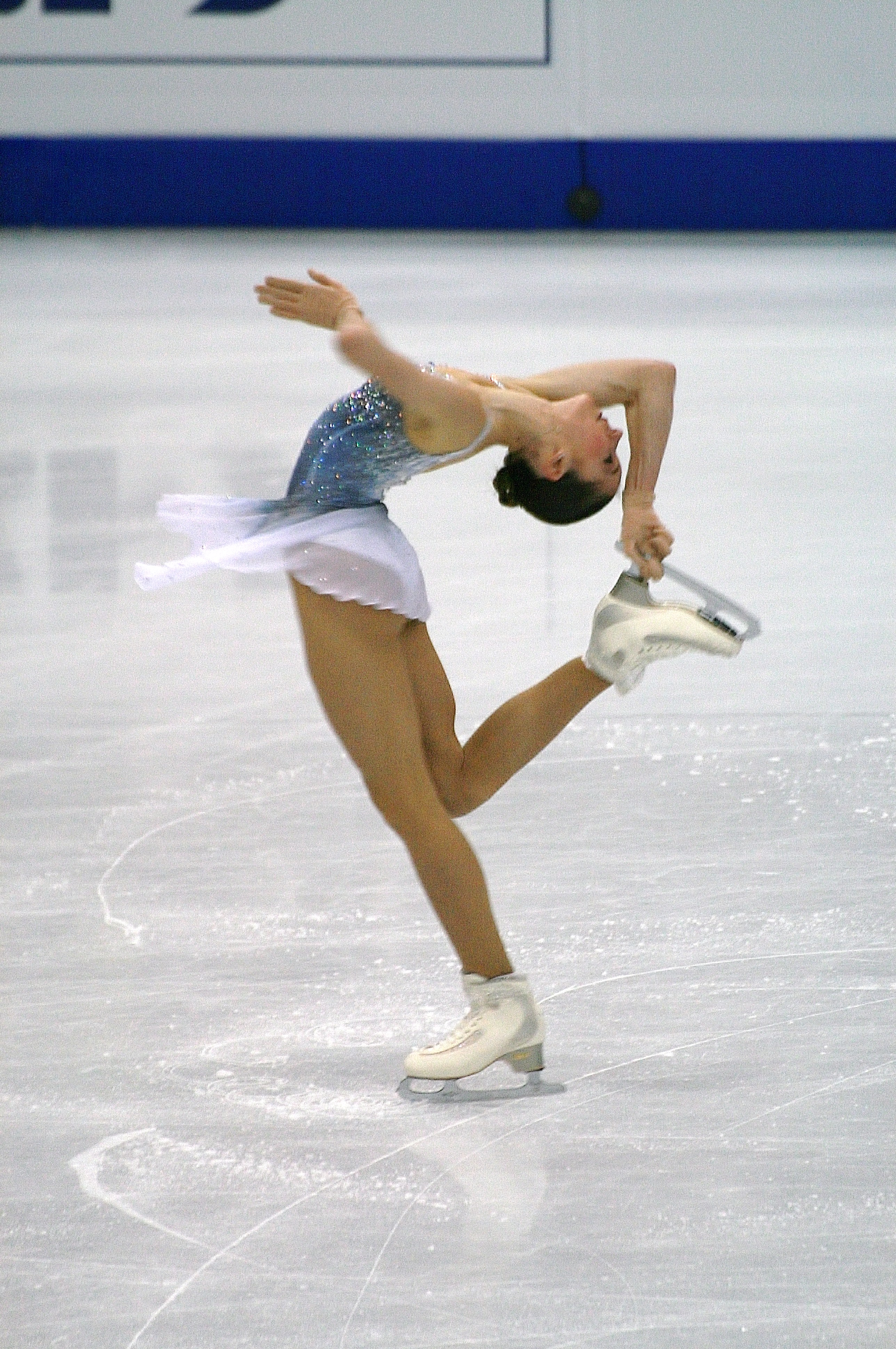
Layback spin with catch-foot

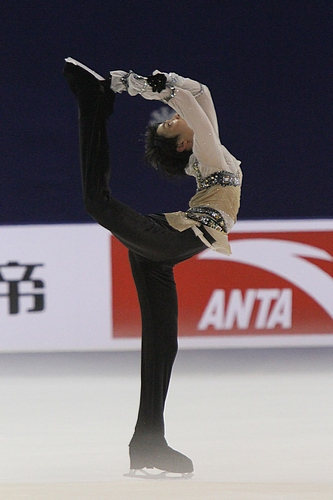
Biellmann spin

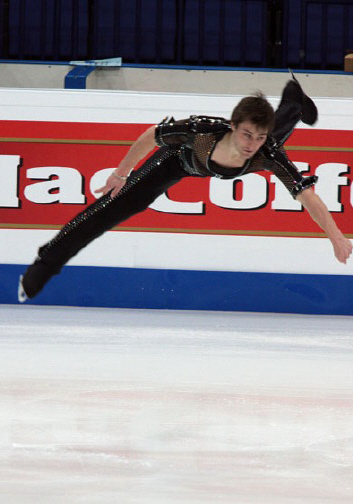
Death drop

=== Lifts ===
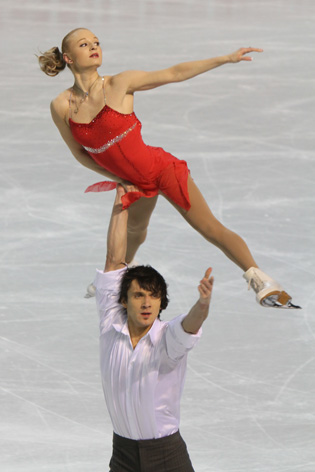
Pair skaters performing a one-arm overhead lift

Figure skating lifts are required elements in pair skating and ice dance. There are five groups of lifts in pair skating, categorized in order of increasing level of difficulty. Judges look for the following when evaluating pair lifts: speed of entry and exit; control of the woman's free leg when she is exiting out of the lift, with the goal of keeping the leg high and sweeping; the position of the woman in the air; the man's footwork; quick and easy changes of position; and the maintenance of flow throughout the lift. Twist lifts are "the most thrilling and exciting component in pair skating". They can also be the most difficult movement to perform correctly. They require more strength and coordination than many other pair elements, and are usually the first or second element in a program. According to the International Skating Union (ISU), "the Woman must be caught in the air at the waist by the Man prior to landing and be assisted to a smooth landing on the ice on a backward outside edge on one foot" during a twist lift.

The ISU defines dance lifts as "a movement in which one of the partners is elevated with active and/or passive assistance of the other partner to any permitted height, sustained there and set down on the ice". Dance lifts are delineated from pair lifts to ensure that ice dance and pair skating remain separate disciplines. After the judging system changed from the 6.0 system to the ISU Judging System (IJS), dance lifts became more "athletic, dramatic and exciting". There are two types of dance lifts: short lifts, which should be done in under seven seconds; and combination lifts, which should be done in under 12 seconds. A well-balanced free dance program in ice dance must include dance lifts.

=== Turns, steps, moves ===
Along with other forms of skating, figure skating is one of the only human powered activities where travelling backwards is integral to the discipline. The ability to skate well backwards and forwards are considered to be equally important, as is the ability to transition well between the two.

Step sequences are a required element in all four Olympic disciplines. The pattern can be straight line, circular, or serpentine. The step sequence consists of a combination of turns, steps, hops and edge changes. Additionally, steps and turns can be used as transitions between elements. The various turns, which skaters can incorporate into step sequences, include:

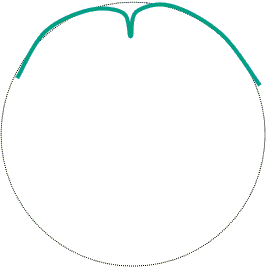
Three-turn: the blade turns into the curve of the edge or lobe.

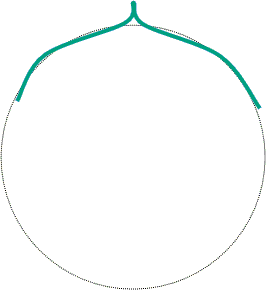
Bracket turn: the blade is turned counter to the curve of the lobe.

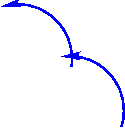
Mohawk: the two-foot equivalent
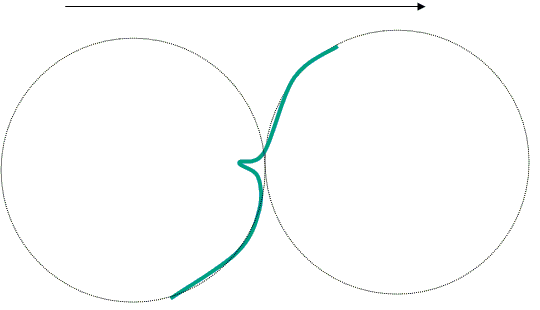
Rocker: one-foot turn involving a change of lobe as well as direction

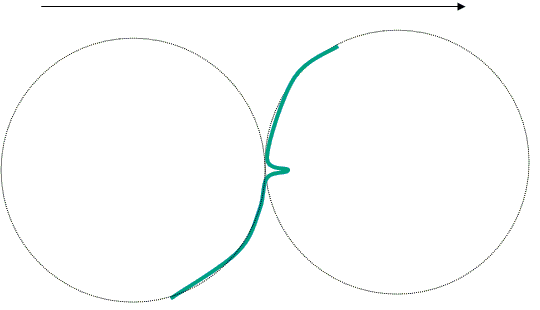
Counter: one-foot turn involving a change of lobe as well as direction

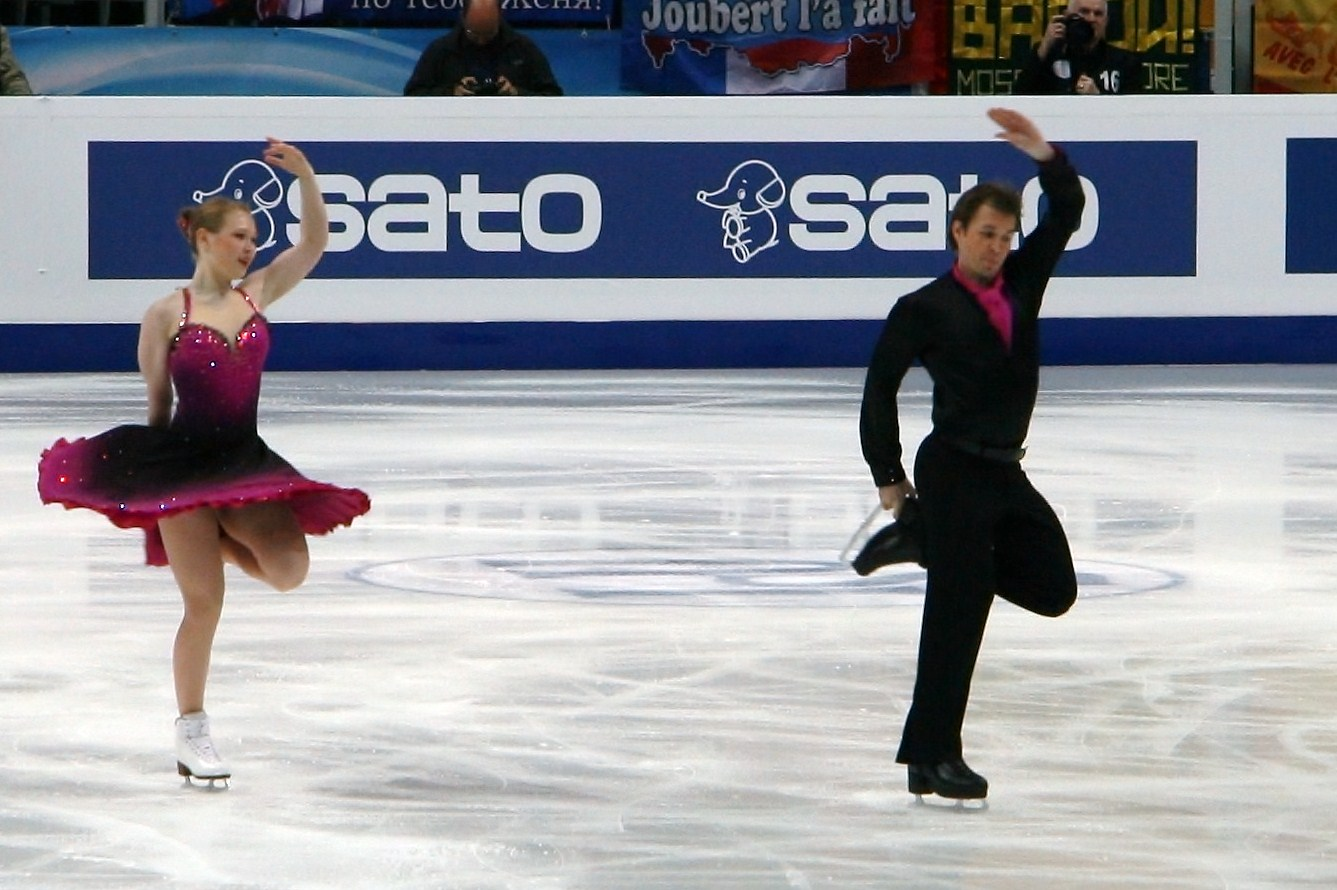
Twizzles: traveling multi-rotation turns on one foot

Choctaws are the two-foot equivalents of rockers and counters. Other movements that may be incorporated into step sequences or used as connecting elements include lunges and spread eagles. An Ina Bauer is similar to a spread eagle performed with one knee bent and typically an arched back. Hydroblading refers to a deep edge performed with the body as low as possible to the ice in a near-horizontal position.

Moves in the field is a pre-determined required sequence that demonstrated basic skating skills and edge control. In the context of a competitive program, they include sequences that may include spirals, spread eagles, Ina Bauers, hydroblading, and similar extended edge moves, along with loops, twizzles, and different kinds of turns.

A spiral is an element in which the skater moves across the ice on a specific edge with the free leg held at hip level or above. Spirals are distinguished by the edge of the blade used (inside or outside), the direction of motion (forward or backward), and the skater's position. A spiral sequence is one or more spiral positions and edges done in sequence. Judges look at the depth, stability, and control of the skating edge, speed and ice coverage, extension, and other factors. Some skaters can change edges during a spiral, i.e. from inside to outside edge. Spirals performed on a "flat" are generally not considered as true spirals. Spiral sequences were required in women's and pair skating prior to the 2012–13 season, but from the 2012–13 season onward, they were replaced by the choreographic sequence. The choreographic sequence consists of moves in the field, unlisted jumps, spinning movements, etc. and is required for the men's, women's and pair free program.

A death spiral is a required element of pair skating. There are four varieties distinguished by the lady's edge and direction of motion. The man performs a pivot, one toe anchored in the ice, while holding the hand of his partner, who circles him on a deep edge with her body almost parallel to the ice. As of 2011, the woman's head must at some time reach her skating knee. The man must also be in a full pivot position and the death spiral must be held for a minimum amount of rotation, depending on the level.

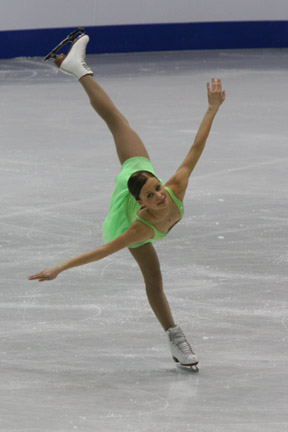
A basic outside edge spiral position with the free leg held unsupported behind the body

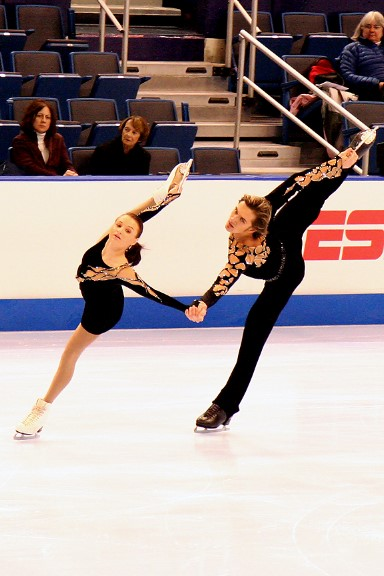
A pair outside edge spiral in a catch-foot position

Back inside death spiral

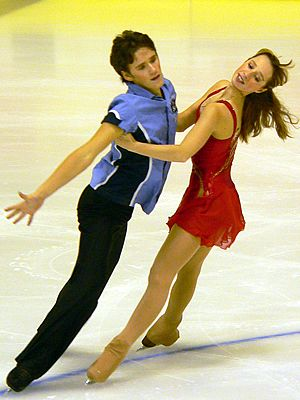
Parallel mirror spread eagles with the man on an inside edge and the woman on an outside edge

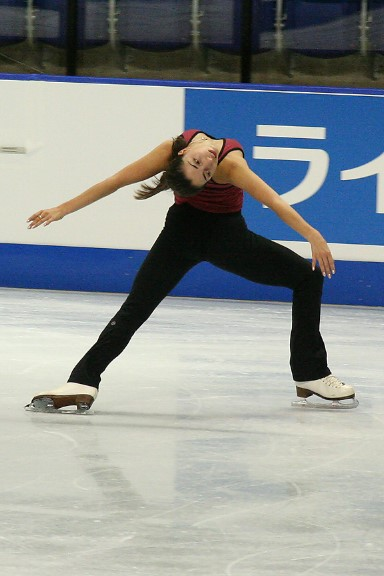
Ina Bauer

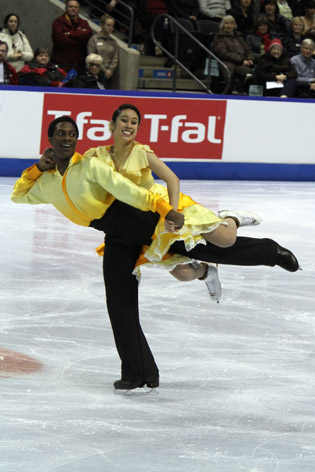
Canadian Championships Dance

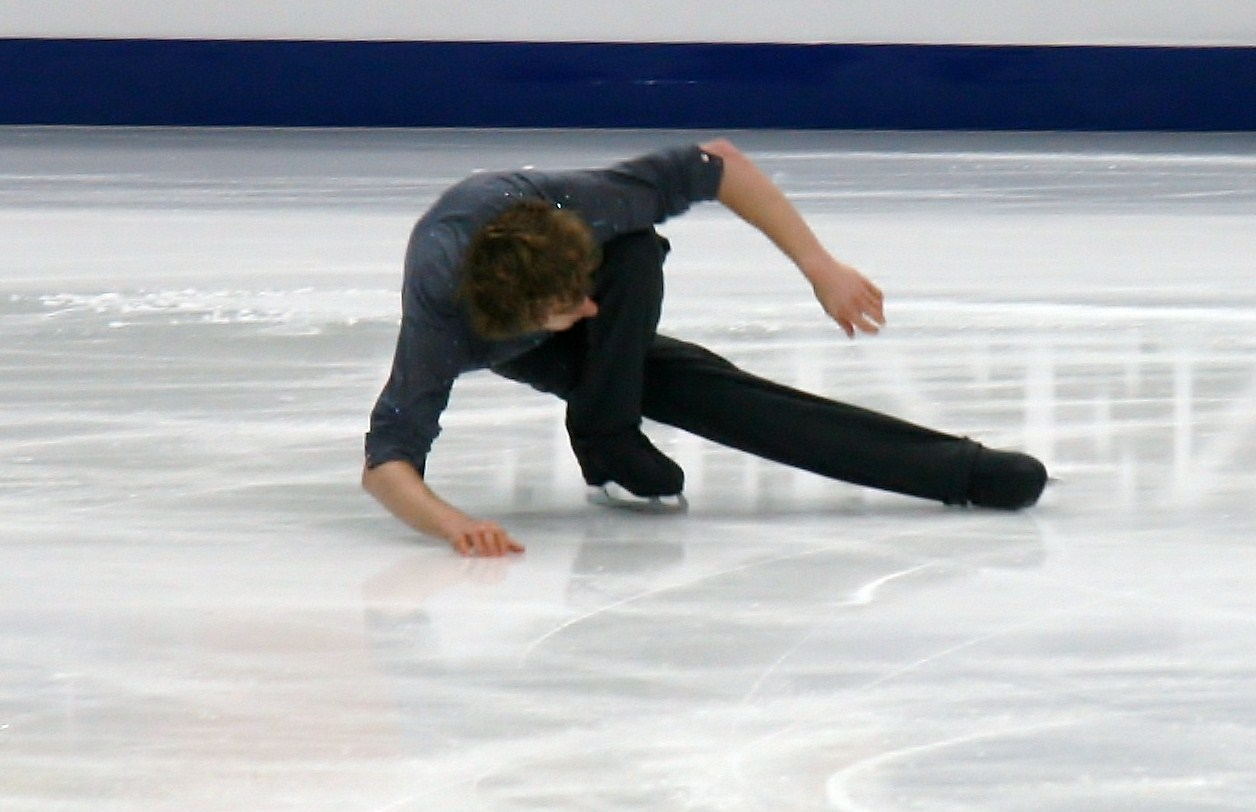
Hydroblading

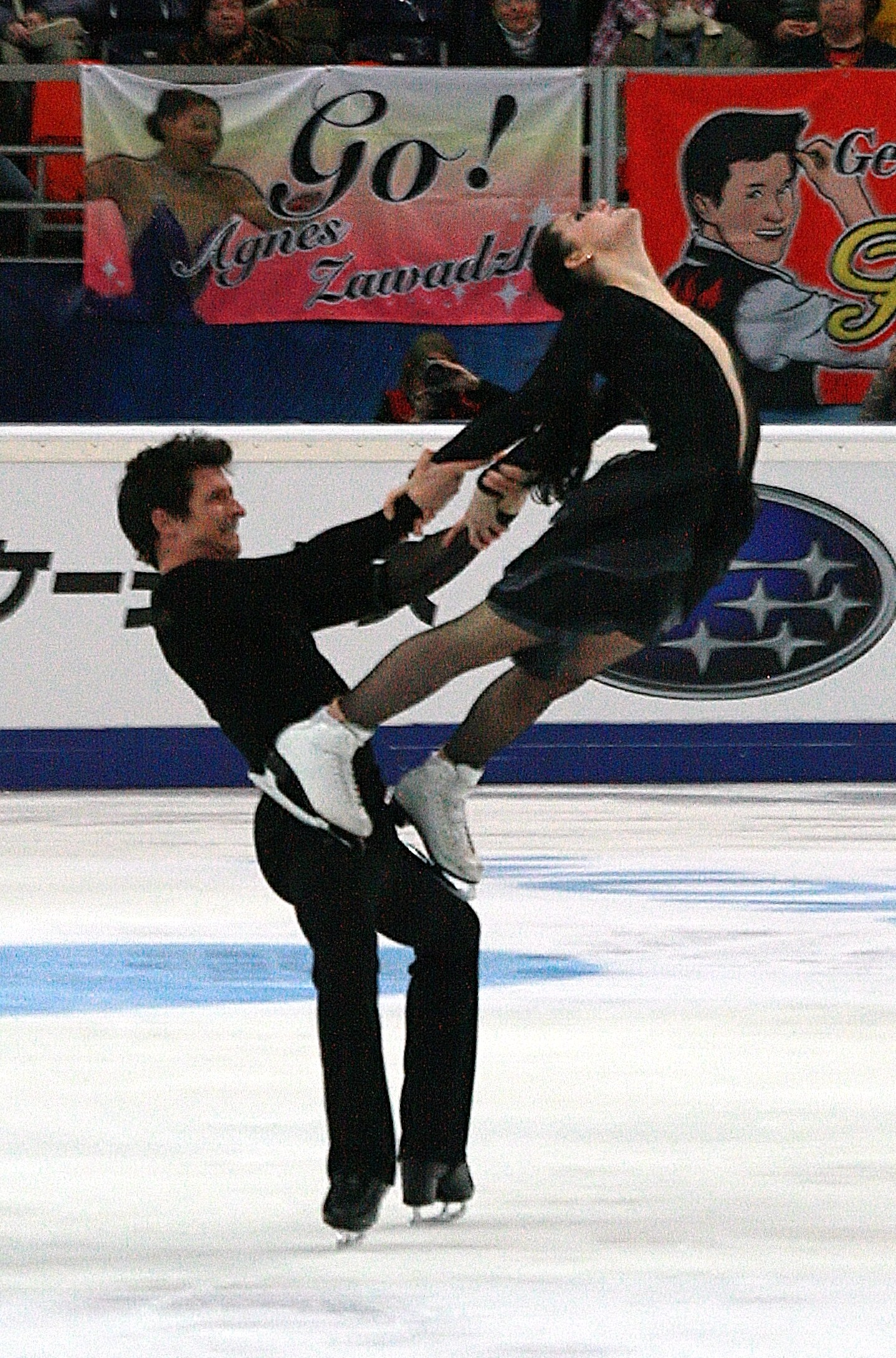
Male ice dancer in Besti squat while lifting his partner

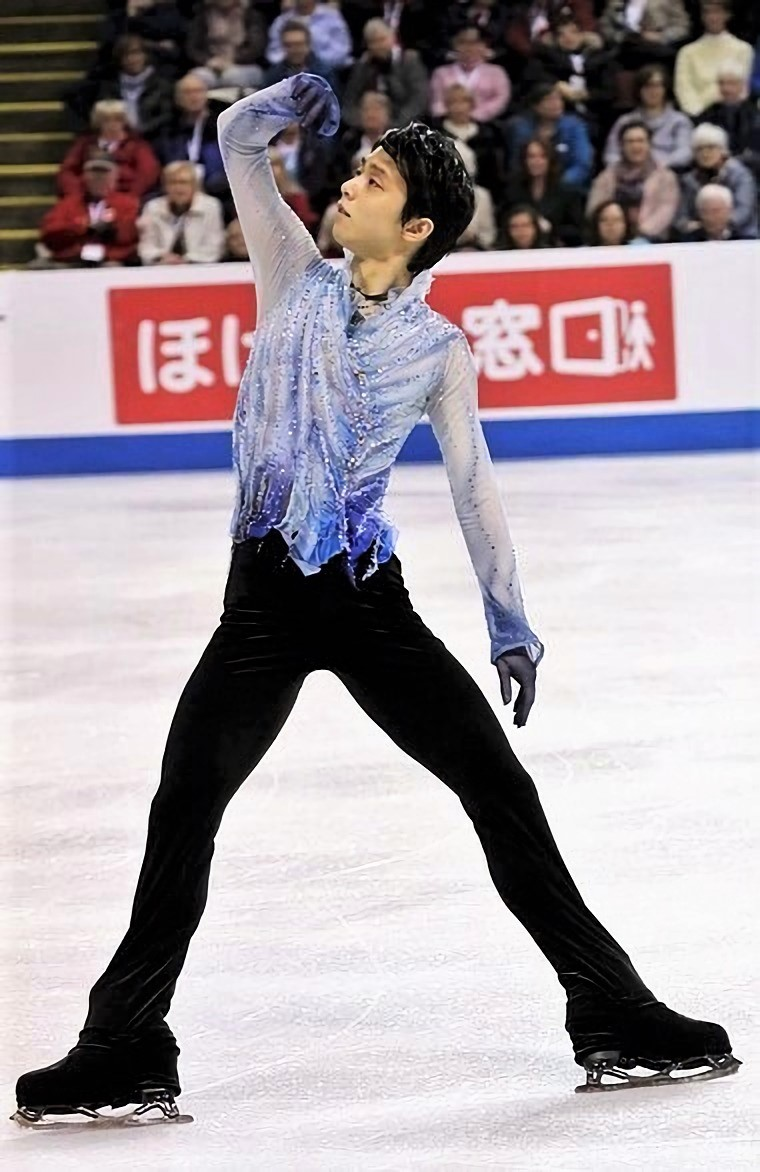
Spread eagle

== Competition format and scoring ==
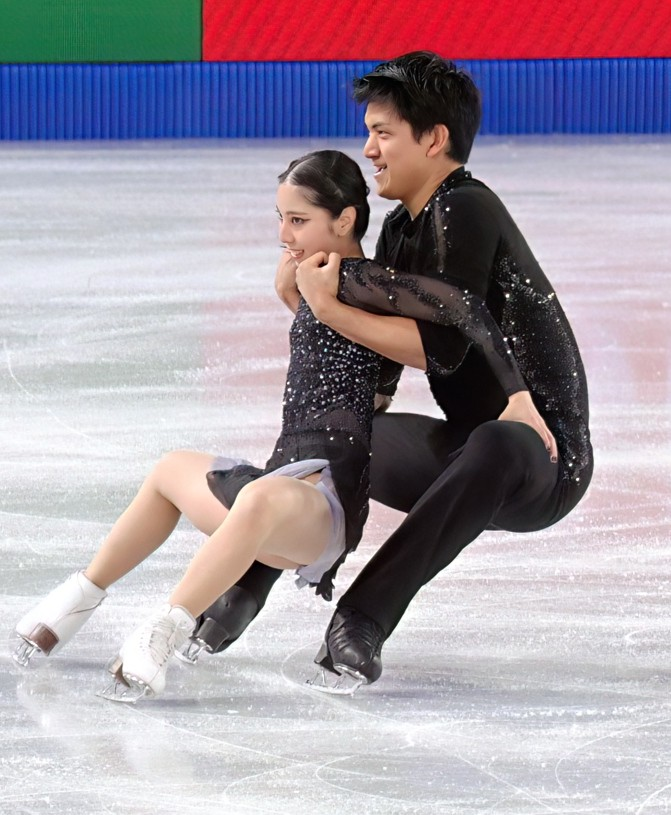
Pair Skaters Riku Miura and Ryuichi Kihara performing a cantilever during their short program at the 2024-25 Grand Prix Final

The ISU is the governing body for international competitions in figure skating, including the World Championships and the figure skating events at the Winter Olympic Games. Medals are awarded for overall results; the standard medals are gold for first place, silver for second, and bronze for third place. U.S. Figure Skating also awards pewter medals for fourth-place finishers in national events. Additionally, at the World, European, Four Continents, and World Junior Championships, the ISU awards small medals for segment results (short and free program) (Since 2009). A medal is generally attributed to only one country, even if a partnership is composed of skaters with different nationalities. A notable exception was the pair skating partnership between Ludowika Eilers and Walter Jakobsson; their 1910–11 medals were attributed to both Germany and Finland. Beyond the early 20th century, no skaters have been allowed to represent two countries in the same competition.

In singles and pairs figure skating competition, competitors perform two programs: the short program, in which they complete a set of required elements consisting of jumps, spins and steps; and the free skate, also known as the long program, in which they have a slightly wider choice of elements. Under both the 6.0 system and the ISU Judging System, the judges consider the "complete package" when evaluating performances, i.e. the best jumper is not always placed first if the judges consider the difference in jumping execution to be outweighed by another skater's speed, spins, presentation, etc.

Ice dance competitions formerly consisted of three phases: one or more compulsory dances; an original dance to a ballroom rhythm that was designated annually; and a free dance to music of the skaters' own choice. Beginning in the 2010–11 season, the compulsory and original dances were merged into the short dance, which itself was renamed the rhythm dance in June 2018, before the 2018–19 season.

=== Medals ===
==== Overall Medals (Stage 1 + Stage 2) ====
Medals awarded to the skaters who achieved the highest overall placements in each discipline.

==== Small Medals ====
Small Medals awarded only at ISU Championships since probably 2009:

Stage 1 = Small medals awarded to the skaters who achieved the highest short program or rhythm dance placements in each discipline.

Stage 2 = Small medals awarded to the skaters who achieved the highest free skating or free dance placements in each discipline.

Small Medals awarded only at ISU Championships:

1. World Figure Skating Championships
2. World Junior Figure Skating Championships
3. European Figure Skating Championships
4. Four Continents Figure Skating Championships

Small Medals not awarded in:

1. Figure skating at the Olympic Games
2. ISU Grand Prix of Figure Skating
3. or any other international competitions

=== 6.0 System ===
Skating was formerly judged for "technical merit" (in the free skate), "required elements" (in the short program), and "presentation" (in both programs). The marks for each program ran from 0.0 to 6.0, the latter being the highest. These marks were used to determine a preference ranking (or "ordinal") separately for each judge; the judges' preferences were then combined to determine placements for each skater in each program. The placements for the two programs were then combined, with the free skate placement weighted more heavily than the short program. The highest placing individual (based on the sum of the weighted placements) was declared the winner.

=== ISU Judging System ===
In 2004, in response to the judging controversy during the 2002 Winter Olympics, the ISU adopted the International Judging System (IJS), which became mandatory at all international competitions in 2006, including the 2006 Winter Olympics. The new system is sometimes informally referred to as the Code of Points, however, the ISU has never used the term to describe their system in any of their official communications.

Under the IJS, points are awarded individually for each skating element, and the sum of these points is the total element score (TES). Competitive programs are constrained to include a set number of elements. Each element is judged first by a technical specialist who identifies the specific element and determines its base value. This is done using instant replay video to verify features that distinguish different elements; e.g. the exact foot position at take-off and landing of a jump. A panel of nine judges then each award a mark for the quality and execution of the element. This mark, called the grade of execution (GOE), is an integer with a minimum value of −5 and a maximum value of +5. The GOE mark is then translated into another value by using the table of values in ISU rule 322. The highest and lowest values are discarded, and the average is calculated. This average value is then added to (or subtracted from) the base value to determine the total value for the element. Previously, the GOE marks from the nine judges were processed with a computerized random selection and the average of the remaining seven was calculated.

Note: The IJS previously used a GOE scale of −3 to +3, but this was changed for the 2018–19 season.

The program components score (PCS) awards points to holistic aspects of a program or other nuances that are not rewarded in the total element score. The components are:

- Composition : This evaluates how the program is designed in relation to the music; how are the different elements connected; how is the available space used; how does the choreography reflect musical phrase and form?

- Presentation: This evaluates how the program is performed; what does the skater express and project; what energy is created; what is the musical sensitivity and timing; for Pair, Ice Dance and Synchronized skating is the skating appropriately synchronized and showing awareness of space?

- Skating skills: This mark assesses the skater's command of the blade over the ice, including the ability to skate with power and ease. The judges look at variety and clarity of edges, balance, body control, turns, steps, flow, power and speed.

A detailed description of each component is given in ISU rule 322.2. Judges award each component a raw mark from 0 to 10 in increments of 0.25, with a mark of 5 being defined as "average". For each separate component, the raw marks are then selected, trimmed, and averaged in a manner akin to determining a grade of execution. The trimmed mean scores are then translated into a factored mark by multiplying by a factor that depends on the discipline, competition segment, and level. Then the five (or four) factored marks are added to give the final PCS score.

The total element score and the program components score are added to give the total score for a competition segment (TSS). A skater's final placement is determined by the total of their scores in all segments of a competition. No ordinal rankings are used to determine the final results.

=== Other judging and competition ===
There are also skating competitions organized for professional skaters by independent promoters. These competitions use judging rules set by whoever organizes the competition. There is no "professional league". Well-known professional competitions in the past have included the World Professional Championships, the Challenge Of Champions, and the Canadian Professional Championships.

The Ice Skating Institute (ISI), an international ice rink trade organization, runs its own competitive and test program aimed at recreational skaters. Originally headquartered in Minnesota, the organization now operates out of Dallas, Texas. ISI competitions are open to any member that have registered their tests. There are very few "qualifying" competitions, although some districts hold Gold Competitions for that season's first-place winners. ISI competitions are especially popular in Asian countries that do not have established ISU member federations. The Gay Games have also included skating competitions for same-gender pairs and dance couples under ISI sponsorship. Other figure skating competitions for adults also attract participants from diverse cultures.

== World rankings and season's bests ==
=== ISU World Standings ===
The world standing (WS) of a skater/team is calculated using the results of the current and preceding two seasons. The World Standings are used as basis for the draws at ISU events and part of the criteria for the selection of competitors for the Grand Prix series and other ISU events. The number of points scored by each skater/team depends on the final placement and the total amount of points designated for that particular event.

The following events earn points, with limits on how many results count towards a skater/team's WS:

- ISU Championships (Worlds, Europeans, Four Continents, and Junior Worlds) and Olympic Winter Games: The best two results by points over the three seasons (maximum one result per season).
- ISU Grand Prix (including Semi-Finals (from 2027/28) and Final) and ISU Junior Grand Prix (including Final): The best four results by points over three seasons (maximum two results per season).
- International Competitions Senior (including ISU Challenger Series) and Junior: The best four results by points over three seasons (maximum two results per season).

Current and intermediate season's earned points count for 100% value, and previous season's earned points count for 70% value. After the current season's World Championships, the results from the earliest season are deleted.

If pairs and ice dance teams officially split up, their partnership will be removed from the standings. Any new partnership starts with zero points; there is no transfer of WS points. Only eligible skaters/teams are considered in the standings. When a skater/team officially retires, they will be removed from the standings.

=== ISU Season's World Ranking ===
The season's world ranking (SWR) of a skater/team is calculated using the results of the current season. The number of points scored by each skater/team depends on the final placement and the total amount of points designated for that particular event.

The following events earn points, with limits on how many results count towards a skater/team's SWR:

- ISU Championships (Worlds, Europeans, Four Continents, and Junior Worlds) and Olympic Winter Games: The best result by points of the current season.
- ISU Grand Prix (including Semi-Finals (from 2027/28) and Final) and ISU Junior Grand Prix (including Final): The two best results by points of the current season.
- International Competitions Senior (including ISU Challenger Series) and Junior: The two best results by points of the current season.

The Season's World Ranking is finalized after the World Championships.

=== Season's bests ===
The season's best (SB) of a skater/couple is the highest score achieved within a particular season. There is an SB for the combined total score and the individual segment scores (short program/rhythm dance, free skating/free dance). Only scores achieved at selected international competitions are considered; scores from national competitions and some international events are disregarded. The best combined total for each skater or couple appears on a list of season's bests, and the list may be used to help determine participants in the following season's Grand Prix series.

Skaters and couples also have personal best (PB) scores, i.e. the highest scores achieved over their entire career, in terms of combined total and segment scores. However, PB scores are not completely comparable if achieved in different seasons because the ISU regulations and technical rules are modified before each new season. There may be different requirements specified to achieve a certain level; the required elements may change and new elements may be allowed (for example, two quads in the short program were permitted starting in the 2010–11 season); and the point values may change (for example, the values of quads were increased after the 2010 Olympics, and a second step sequence is no longer assigned a level in the men's competition). As a result of these variations in the technical requirements, the ISU places more weight on the season's bests, which are fully comparable within any one season.

== Music and clothing ==
=== Music ===
For competitive programs, figure skaters were once restricted to instrumental music; vocals were allowed only if they contained no lyrics or words. Beginning in the 1997–98 season, the ISU decided to allow lyrics or words in ice dance music. Although the rules were not relaxed for singles and pairs, judges did not always penalize violations. At the 2011 World Championships, Florent Amodio's long program music included words but an insufficient number of judges voted for a deduction. In June 2012, the ISU voted to allow skaters from all disciplines to choose music with words in their competitive programs beginning in the 2014–15 season.

Skaters may use professional music editors so that their music meets requirements. Ice dancers are required to skate to music that has a definite beat or rhythm. Singles and pair skaters more often skate to the melody and phrasing of their music. For long programs, figure skaters generally search for music with different moods and tempos. Music selections for exhibitions are less constrained than for competitive programs.

=== Clothing ===
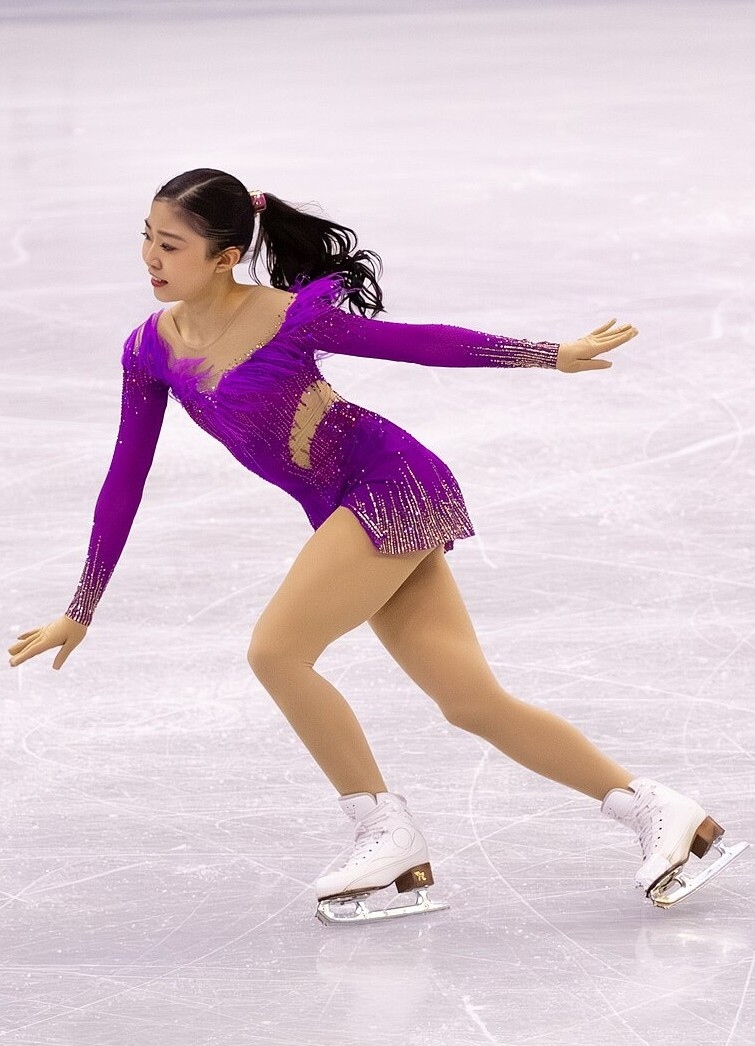
An example of women's figure skating costumes (Mone Chiba at the 2025 Skate Canada International)

Skaters are generally free to select their own attire, with a few restrictions. In competition, women may wear a dress, typically with matching attached briefs. This rule of costuming was created in response to Katarina Witt's costume and performance at the 1988 Winter Olympics. In 2004, the rule was extended to allow women to wear trousers. They may wear opaque flesh-colored leggings or tights under dresses and skirts, which may extend to cover their skates. Men must wear trousers – they are not allowed to wear tights, although officials do not always impose a deduction for violations. Matching costumes are not required in pair skating and ice dance.

Competition costumes vary widely, from simple designs to heavily beaded or trimmed costumes. Skaters risk a deduction if a piece of their costume falls onto the ice surface. An official may stop a program if they deem there to be a hazard. Skaters and family members may design their own costumes, sometimes with assistance from their coach or choreographer, or turn to professional designers. Costumes may cost thousands of dollars if designed by a top-level costume maker.

According to current ISU regulations, costumes in competition must be fair, non-revealing, and appropriate for both short and long programs. Costumes should not be showy or exotic in nature. Clothing, however, can reflect the genre of music chosen. Although the use of flesh-colored fabric means the costumes are often less revealing than they may appear, there have been repeated attempts to ban clothing that gives the impression of "excessive nudity" or that is otherwise inappropriate for athletic competition. In general, accessories or props are not permitted in competition. The ISU allowed an exception for the original dance in the 2007–08 season but not since.

== Eligibility ==
=== Age eligibility ===
To compete internationally on the senior level, skaters must be at least 17 before July 1 of the preceding year. To be eligible for junior-level events, a skater must be at least 13 but under 19 before that date (or 21 for male pair skaters and ice dancers of both genders). A skater must meet the age requirement before it becomes July 1 in their place of birth. For example, Adelina Sotnikova was born a few hours into July 1, 1996, in Moscow and consequently, was not eligible to compete at Junior Worlds until 2011 and senior Worlds until 2013. The ISU's rules apply to international events. Many countries have no age requirements for domestic non-ISU competitions, thus, some skaters compete at the senior level nationally while not eligible for international competition.

The ISU has modified its age rules several times. Before the 1990s, 12 was the minimum age for senior international competitions. New rules were introduced in 1996, requiring skaters to be at least 15 before July 1 of the preceding year to compete at the Olympics, Worlds, Europeans, or Four Continents. The minimum age for all other senior internationals was 14 until July 2014, when it was raised to 15. The age limit was then raised to 16 years old for the 2023–24 season before increasing to 17 for the 2024–25 season, in a move to raise the age limit gradually. The move came after the 2022 Winter Olympics scandal over Kamila Valieva's doping allegations and the controversy over her responsibility as a minor.

During the 2005–06 season, Mao Asada of Japan was age-eligible to compete at the Grand Prix Final, where she claimed the title, but she was not permitted to compete at the Olympics. For the 2008 World Championships, the United States was obliged to send skaters who had placed 5th and 7th at nationals because higher-placed skaters were too young, including a skater who missed the cutoff by 20 days. The ISU has strictly enforced the rules in recent years. However, American pair skater Natasha Kuchiki was allowed to compete at the 1990 World Championships when she was two years too young and American single skater Tara Lipinski, who was 13 at the time the 1996 rules were introduced, was grandfathered into remaining eligible for future events, along with other skaters who had already competed at the World Championships. A loophole also existed for a few years for underage skaters who had medaled at Junior Worlds.

As in gymnastics, skating has experienced controversy surrounding possible age falsification. On February 14, 2011, questions emerged surrounding nine Chinese skaters. The Associated Press found that birthdates listed on the Chinese Skating Association's website suggested five female skaters, Sui Wenjing, Zhang Dan, Yu Xiaoyu, Geng Bingwa, and Xu Binshu, were younger than their ISU ages, and six male skaters, Han Cong, Zhang Hao, Yan Han and Gao Yu, Zang Wenbo, and Xu Zuoren were older. The dates disappeared from the website by February 15. On February 17, the ISU said there were no discrepancies for Zhang Dan, Zhang Hao, and Xu Binshu between the birthdates listed on their passports, ISU registration forms and the Chinese Olympic Committee's website. Athletes in China sometimes face pressure to falsify their age.

=== Other eligibility rules ===
Skaters may represent a country of which they are not yet a citizen in most competitions, except the Olympics which require citizenship.

At most international events, each country may send one to a maximum of three entries per discipline. Consequently, even if a skater has a high season's best, he or she may not be sent to major events if their country has many good skaters in their discipline. Some skaters have tried to circumvent this by representing another country. In response, the ISU introduced rules barring skaters from international events for a certain period of time. In the 2010 regulations, it was 24 months or more from the date of the last ISU Championship. In the 2012 regulations, the minimum was 18 months for singles and 12 months for pairs/ice dancers from the date of their last ISU Championships (Worlds, Europeans, Four Continents, Junior Worlds) and 12 months if they competed in some other international competition. Competitors may sit out for much longer because they also have to obtain a release from their previous federation. The ISU has set no limit to how long a country may hold skaters.

Skaters may lose their ISU eligibility if they perform in an unsanctioned show or competition.

Beginning in the 2010–11 season, minimum scores were introduced for the World, European, or Four Continents Championships. In the 2011–12 season, different minimum scores were introduced for the Grand Prix series.

== Competitors' expenses, income, and funding ==
Figure skating is an expensive sport. This is particularly due to the costs of ice time and coaching. In the late 1980s, the expenses of a top-ten women's competitor at the U.S. Championships reached nearly US$50,000 a year. In October 2004, a U.S. Figure Skating article estimated the annual expense at US$9,000–$10,000 for pre-juvenile, US$18,000 for juvenile, US$35,000–$40,000 for novice, and said junior and senior levels were somewhat more expensive. In the 2010s, American senior national medalists had expenses in the mid-five-figure range. Swiss skater Stéphane Lambiel said his costs were around CHF 100,000 per season. World champion Patrick Chan's expenses were Can$150,000. In 2015, CBC Sports estimated that a Canadian pair team had expenses of about Can$100,000 per year.

Prize money is relatively low compared to other sports. A men's or women's singles skater who won the 2011 World Championships earned US$45,000, about 1.8% to 2.5% of the US$1,800,000–$2,400,000 for winners of the tennis US Open and Australian Open. A couple who won the pairs or ice dance title split US$67,500. A winner of the senior Grand Prix Final in December 2011 earned US$25,000.

Some national associations provide funding to some skaters if they meet certain criteria. Many skaters take part-time jobs and some have tried crowdfunding. In Germany, many elite skaters join the army to fund their skating. In Italy, some skaters join police agencies' sport groups, such as the Polizia Penitenziaria's Fiamme Azzurre (Carolina Kostner, Anna Cappellini, Luca Lanotte) or Polizia di Stato's Fiamme Oro (Federica Faiella, Paolo Bacchini). Some competitive skaters depend on income from shows. Shows must be sanctioned by their association, i.e. skaters may lose their competitive eligibility if they take part without permission. In some cases, skaters may feel pressure to compete through injury to be allowed to perform in a show. Others may become involved with coaching younger athletes in order to fund their own training costs.

== Injuries and health issues ==
In some countries, medical personnel may be slow to respond to accidents. At the 2000 World Championships in Nice, France, a pair skater who had been injured in a lift accident lay on the ice for several minutes and had to get up and leave the ice on his own before being offered medical attention.

=== Head injuries, falls and collisions ===
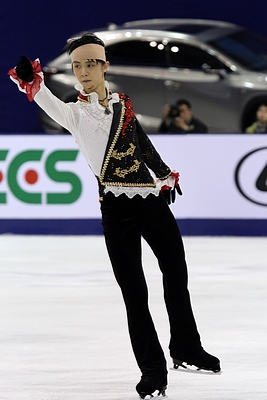
Yuzuru Hanyu competes with his head bandaged after his accident at the 2014 Cup of China

Competitive skaters generally do not wear helmets or other protective gear. There is a risk of head injuries, particularly in pair skating as a result of falls from lifts. Although pair skaters are most susceptible, serious head injuries can occur in all disciplines, including ice dance. Partners have accidentally slashed each other with their skate blades. This may occur when partners drift too close during side-by-side camel spins. Several female pair skaters have suffered head/face injuries during this element, including Elena Berezhnaya, Tatiana Totmianina, Jessica Dubé, Mandy Wötzel, Galina Maniachenko (Efremenko), and Elena Riabchuk.

Commenting on falls and concussions, Madison Hubbell said that "Most of the time, the worst falls are on things we kind of take for granted." Shin splints, knee injuries, and back problems are not uncommon. Hip damage may occur as a result of practising jumps and throws. In rare cases, intensive training of spins may result in subtle concussions (Lucinda Ruh).

Injuries have also been sustained by skaters from different teams when many skaters are practising on the ice. Midori Ito collided with Laetitia Hubert at the 1991 World Championships, while Oksana Baiul and Tanja Szewczenko collided at the 1994 Olympics, but all went on to compete. At the 2014 Cup of China the Japanese Yuzuru Hanyu, winner of the Olympic title a few months before, and the Chinese Han Yan, collided during the warm up of the free program. Despite being visibly injured, both skaters finished the competition. On practice sessions with multiple skaters on the ice, the skater whose music is playing conventionally has right of way. Also, pairs and ice dancers skating as a unit have right of way over those skating separately as changing course is more difficult for a couple.

=== Eating disorders and RED–S ===
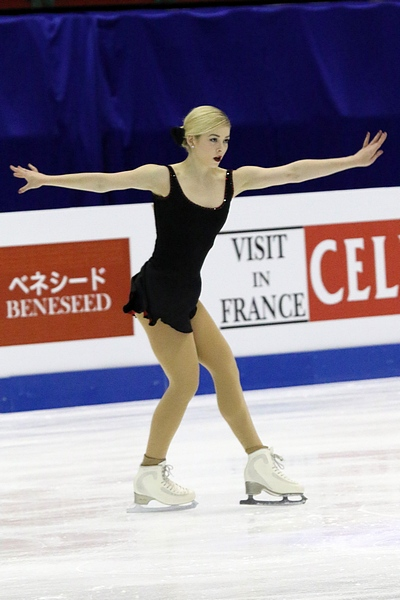
Gracie Gold at the 2016 Four Continents Championship.

Eating disorders are reportedly common in figure skating and can result in the development of relative energy deficiency in sport (RED-S), formerly known as the "female athlete triad". RED-S is a syndrome of three interrelated conditions which can cause long-standing illness in girls and women and even death. Body image and the need to maintain a fit body is a very common issue in figure skating, as skaters age, their bodies change and change the way they must approach the sport. Skaters such as Gracie Gold and Ashley Wagner have faced issues such as eating disorders and depression.

=== Doping ===
Figure skaters occasionally have positive doping results but it is not common. In a 1991 interview, three-time Olympic champion Irina Rodnina admitted that Soviet skaters used doping substances in preparation for the competitive season, stating: "Boys in pairs and singles used drugs, but this was only in August or September. This was done just in training, and everyone was tested (in the Soviet Union) before competitions."

== History ==
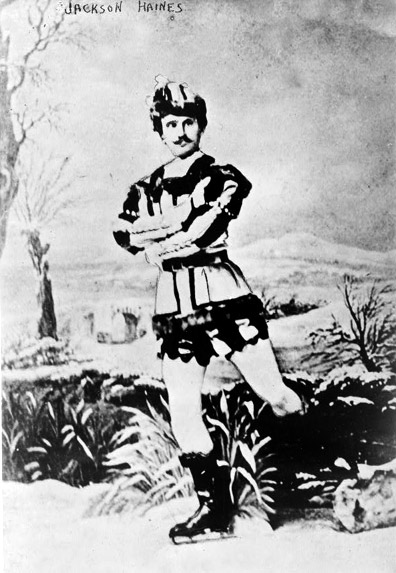
Jackson Haines is considered the father of modern figure skating.

Although people have been ice skating for centuries, figure skating in its current form originated in the mid-19th century. A Treatise on Skating (1772) by the accomplished skater, Welshman Lt. 'Captain' Robert Jones (c. 1740 – c. 1788), is the first-known book on figure skating. He designed skates that could be attached to shoes by screws through the heels (rather than using straps), and these were soon available from Riccard's Manufactory in London.

Competitions were held in the "English style" of skating, which was stiff and formal and bore very little resemblance to modern figure skating. Without changing the basic techniques used by skaters, only a limited number of figure skating moves could be performed. This was still true in the mid-1800s before improvements were brought about by American skater Jackson Haines, who was considered to be the "father of modern figure skating". In the mid-1860s, Haines introduced a new style of skating, incorporating free and expressive techniques, which became known as the "international style". Although popular in Europe, the international style of skating was not widely adopted in the United States until long after Haines's death.

=== Early 1900s ===
Special figures by Nikolai Panin at the 1908 Olympics

The International Skating Union was founded in 1892. The first European Figure Skating Championships were held in 1891 in Hamburg, Germany (won by Oskar Uhlig), and the first World Figure Skating Championships were held in 1896 in Saint Petersburg, Russia (won by Gilbert Fuchs). Only men competed in the early events but in 1902 a woman entered the World Championships for the first time: British female skater Madge Syers competed in the men's competition, finishing in second place behind Sweden's Ulrich Salchow. The ISU quickly banned women from competing against men, and established a separate "ladies" competition in 1906. Pair skating was introduced at the 1908 World Championships, where the title was won by Anna Hübler and Heinrich Burger of Germany.

Figure skating was the first winter sport contested at the Olympics; it made its Olympic debut at the 1908 Summer Olympics in London. On March 20, 1914, an international figure skating championship was held in New Haven, Connecticut. This event was the forerunner of both the United States and Canadian National Championships. However, international competitions in figure skating were interrupted by World War I.

In the 1920s and 1930s, figure skating was dominated by Sonja Henie of Norway. Henie turned competitive success into a lucrative professional career as a movie star and touring skater, also setting the fashion for female skaters to wear short skirts and white boots. The top male figure skaters of this period included Sweden's Gillis Grafström and Austria's Karl Schäfer.

=== After World War II ===
Skating competitions were again interrupted for several years by World War II. After the war, with many European rinks in ruins, skaters from the United States and Canada began to dominate international competitions and to introduce technical innovations to the sport. Dick Button, 1948 and 1952 Olympic Champion, was the first skater to perform the double Axel and triple loop jumps, as well as the flying camel spin.

The World Figure Skating Championships did not include ice dance until 1952. In its early years, ice dance was dominated by British skaters, and until 1960 the world title was won every year by a British couple, beginning with Jean Westwood and Lawrence Demmy.

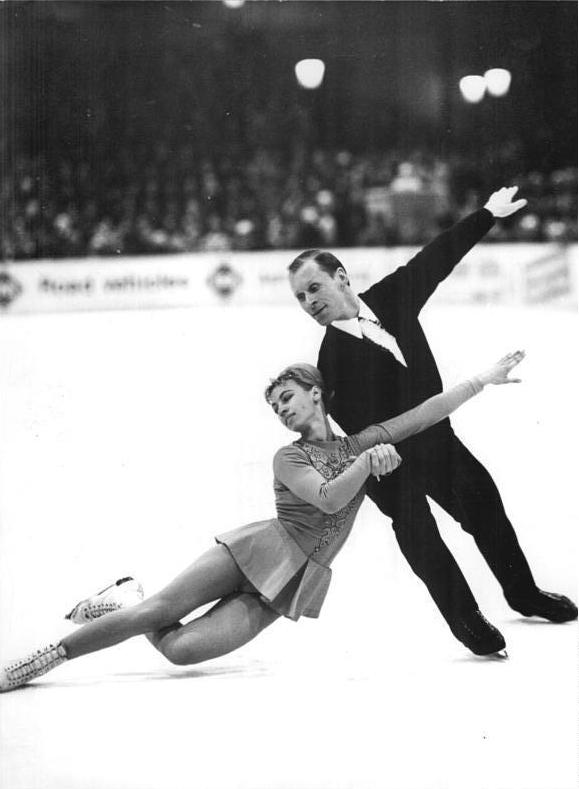
Russian pair skaters Ludmila Belousova and Oleg Protopopov in 1968

On February 15, 1961, the entire U.S. figure skating team and their coaches were killed in the crash of Sabena Flight 548 in Brussels, Belgium en route to the World Championships in Prague. This tragedy sent the U.S. skating program into a period of rebuilding.

Meanwhile, the Soviet Union rose to become a dominant force in the sport, especially in the disciplines of pair skating and ice dance. Soviet and Russian domination in pair skating began in the 1950s and continued throughout the rest of the 1900s. Only five non-Soviet or Russian teams won the Olympics and World Championships from 1965 to 2010. When Shen Xue and Zhao Hongbo of China won the gold medal at the 2010 games, this was the first time since 1960 that a Russian, Soviet, or Unified Team (CIS) flagged team did not win the gold medal. The 1967 World Championships was the last event held on an outdoor rink.

=== Effect of television and the present day ===
Compulsory figures formerly accounted for up to 60% of the score in singles figure skating, meaning that skaters who could build up a significant lead in figures could win competitions even if they were mediocre free skaters. As television coverage of skating events became more important, the popularity of free skating increased because this part of the competition was televised and shown to the general public, whereas the compulsory figures competition was not. The television audience would complain when superior free programs sometimes failed to equate to gold medal victories. Beginning in 1968, the ISU progressively reduced the weighting of compulsory figures and introduced the short program in 1973. A critical issue was said to have been the continued failure of Janet Lynn to achieve on the world stage despite her outstanding free skate programs. For example, she missed out on a podium place at the 1971 World Championships after winning the free skate competition decisively, which produced an uproar and loud booing from the audience during the medal ceremony.

With these changes, the emphasis in competitive figure skating shifted to increased athleticism. Landing triple jumps during the short program and the free skate became more important. By the 1980s, some skaters began practising quadruple jumps. Jozef Sabovčík of Czechoslovakia landed a quad toe loop at the 1986 European Championships which was recognized at the event but then ruled invalid three weeks later due to a touchdown with his free foot. At the 1988 World Championships, Kurt Browning of Canada landed the first quad toe loop which has remained ratified. Despite expectations, it was several years before quads became an important part of men's skating. In 1988, Japan's Midori Ito became the first woman to land a triple Axel, pushing the athletic and technical level for women's programs. Worth only 20% by 1989, compulsory figures were eliminated from international competition in 1990.

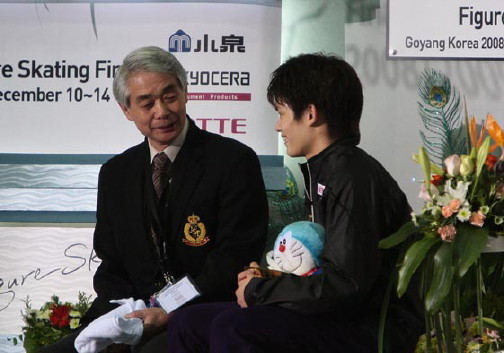
Takahiko Kozuka waits for his marks with coach Nobuo Sato in the "Kiss and cry" area.

Television contributed to the sport's popularity by showing skaters in the kiss and cry area after competing. Television also played a role in removing the restrictive amateur status rules that once governed the sport. In May 1990, the ISU voted to allow skaters intending to skate professionally to return to ISU competition, provided that they obtained their national association's permission. In 1995, in an effort to retain skaters who might otherwise have given up their eligibility to participate in lucrative professional events, the ISU introduced prize money at its major competitions, funded by revenues from selling the TV rights to those events.

In 1984, more than 24 million people in Great Britain watched ice dance pair Jayne Torvill and Christopher Dean earn unanimous 6.0s for presentation, the only perfect score in Olympic skating history, which was ranked the 8th greatest sporting moment in a UK poll. In 1988, East German Katarina Witt became only the second woman in figure skating history, after Norwegian Sonja Henie, to defend her Olympic title successfully. Time magazine called her "the most beautiful face of socialism." In the 1993 National Sports Study II, considered by the Associated Press as the largest study of spectator sport popularity in America, women's figure skating was the second most popular spectator sport in America, just behind NFL football out of over 100 sports surveyed. The 1993 study found that three figure skaters – Dorothy Hamill, Peggy Fleming, and Scott Hamilton – were among the eight most popular athletes in the United States, of more than 800 athletes surveyed. The Tonya Harding scandal in 1994 increased interest in figure skating. The first night of the women's figure skating competition in the 1994 Winter Olympics achieved higher Nielsen TV ratings than the Super Bowl three weeks earlier and, to that date, was the most watched sports television program in the US.

To show support, spectators sometimes throw a variety of items onto the ice after the end of a figure skating program, most commonly stuffed toys and flowers. Officials discourage people from throwing flowers that are not fully wrapped because of the possibility of debris disrupting or endangering the following skaters.

Countries that have produced a great many successful skaters include Russia and the former Soviet Union, the United States, Canada, Japan, China, France, Germany, and Italy. While the sport has grown in East Asia, training opportunities in South Asia are limited due to a scarcity of ice rinks. India had only four major indoor ice rinks as of 2011, but there were plans for ten more to be built, mostly in malls, over the following five years. As of 2016, three of these intended ten indoor rinks were built at Neptune Magnet Mall, Atria Millennium Mall, and Lulu Mall respectively.

Four skating has mostly disappeared, while synchronized skating, singles/pair skating and ice dance have grown. On April 6, 2011, the International Olympic Committee officially confirmed the approval of a figure skating team event, which was introduced at the 2014 Winter Olympics. The elimination of the compulsory dance segment provided space for the team event. Each team is composed of a men's and women's singles skater, a pair, and an ice dance duo. A maximum of ten teams can compete, with five eliminated after the short program. In December 2011, the ISU released details of the qualifying system and the competition.

According to writer Ellyn Kestnbaum, television helped figure skating become more celebrity oriented, with high-profile skaters being treated like entertainers and famous athletes in other sports. She states that television has encouraged "casual fans and other members of the general public to understand skating in terms of media-shaped parables about broader cultural issues," including anxieties about femininity or masculinity, individuality versus conformity, and nationalistic sporting contests. Kestnbaum also states that even though most skating broadcasts are produced by networks' sports divisions, competitions, even the more serious ones, they are packaged with "more emphasis on the aesthetic qualities of the skating—or of the female skaters—and on the pleasures of rooting for a home-country hero than on the technical details that determine the winners". Viewers who depend upon the televised coverage of figure skating are limited in their access to information about it as a sport because broadcasters present a week's worth of competition in a few hours and they are compelled to avoid overloading viewers with too much information about the more technical aspects of the sport. Journalists and scholars who write about figure skating also tend to focus on the same broader cultural issues.

== In popular culture ==
Books

- White Boots (1951)
- The Official Book of Figure Skating (1998)
- The Complete Book of Figure Skating (2002)
- The Science of Figure Skating (2018)

Films and series

- On Ice
- Blades of Glory
- Carmen on Ice
- The Cutting Edge
- The Cutting Edge: Going for the Gold
- The Cutting Edge: Chasing the Dream
- Go Figure
- I, Tonya
- Ice Castles
- Ice Princess
- Snow White and the Three Stooges
- Thin Ice
- Tonya and Nancy: The Inside Story
- Yuri on Ice
- Dancing on Ice
- Medalist (manga)

Video Games

- ESPN International Winter Sports 2002
- Imagine: Figure Skater
- Michelle Kwan Figure Skating
- NBC Sports Figure Skating
- Winter Sports: The Ultimate Challenge

== Literature ==
- The Prose Edda (c. 1220), an Old Norse textbook and compilation of Norse mythology that mentions ice skating, written in Iceland during the early 13th century.
- The Art of Skating, Robert Jones (1772), the earliest book about figure skating.
- Le vrai pattineur (The True Skater), Jean Garcin (1813), the first book about ice skating published in France.
- The Art of Skating, George Anderson (1852), about skating in England and Scotland.
- The Skater's Manual, Edward F. Gill (1863), first book about skating written in North America.
- Figure Skating, H.E. Vandervell and T. Maxwell Witham (1869), the first book to refer to the sport of "figure skating".
- Spuren auf dem Eise (Tracings on the Ice), 1881. Written by three members of the Vienna Skating Club, it described the Viennese style of skating and was the most extensive technical book about figure skating published up to that time. A second expanded edition, which included descriptions of ice dances popular in the 1880s, was published in 1892.
- The Art of Skating, Irving Brokaw (1910). The first of four books about figure skating, all with the same title. Contributors of the first book included leading skaters of the time, including Georg Sanders of Russia, who wrote about special figures, Phyllis Johnson and James H. Johnson from England, who wrote about pair skating, and Gilbert Fuchs from Germany, who wrote an essay entitled, "Theory of Skating".
- Modern Figure Skating, T.D. Richardson (1938). Includes list of jumps created up to that time.
- Wings on My Feet, Sonja Henie (1940).
- Ice Skating: A History, Nigel Brown (1959). First comprehensive history of figure skating.
- 75 Years of European and World Championships (1967). ISU publication to commemorate its 75th anniversary.
- Our Skating Heritage, Dennis Bird (1979). History of the National Skating Association in England, to commemorate its 100th anniversary.
- Skating in America: The 75th Anniversary History of the United Figure Skating Association, Benjamin T. Wright (1996).
