= Robert Jones (figure skater) =

18th-century British military officer and populariser of figure skating

Robert Jones (c. 1820s)

Robert Jones (also known as "Captain Jones") was an officer in the Royal Artillery of the British Army. He is best known for writing and self-publishing The Art of Skating, the first book about figure skating, in 1772, which helped popularize the sport in Great Britain. He also authored a book about and popularising fireworks. The Art of Skating has been called "a milestone in the history of figure skating"; it described basic techniques of skating, which was a recreational activity at the time, before the development of figure skating as a sport in the late 1800s. Jones was the first to recognise skating as an art form and advocated for the inclusion of women in the activity, as long as it was done for leisure.

Jones was tried for sodomy in 1772, accused of committing the act with a 12-year-old boy. He was sentenced to death, but allowed to go into exile. The court case was widely debated and discussed among politicians and in the popular press of the day and was compared to Oscar Wilde's case one hundred years later.

== Life ==
Robert Jones was a lieutenant in the Royal Artillery, but was commonly referred to as "Captain Jones" by the popular press and royal court in the late 1700s. He was most likely associated with the macaronis, the 18th-century English subculture of men who dressed, spoke, and behaved in an unusually sentimental and androgynous manner. Historian and LGBTQ scholar Rictor Norton, who called Jones "a popular character", reported that Jones would attend masquerades dressed like the puppet character Mr Punch.

In 1765, Jones popularised fireworks with the publication of A New Treatise on Artificial Fireworks, which was frequently reprinted. An illustration, which was published in October 1772, may have been a "caricature of Jones as the popularizer of fireworks".

== The Art of Skating ==
In 1772, Jones wrote and self-published The Art of Skating, the earliest book about figure skating. The book went through several reprintings and revisions, "with minor changes made by unnamed persons", and remained available until the mid-1800s. Figure skating historian James R. Hines called it "a milestone in the history of figure skating". Jones described the basic techniques of skating, which was a recreational activity at the time, before the development of figure skating as a sport in the late 1800s. He also described five advanced figures that were skated at the time: these were "circular patterns which skaters trace on the ice" that gave the sport of figure skating its name, with sketches and large colour plates of three of them. According to Hines, the colour plates demonstrate the conservative nature of skating at the time; the clothing the skaters in them wore were "elaborate and formal" (coats with tails and top hats), and one of the figures Jones describes, the flying Mercury, was inspired by mythology and "represented a nod to neoclassicism".

The Flying Mercury, a figure illustrated in The Art of Skating

By the time Jones published The Art of Skating, skating on ice had already evolved into an art form with definable technique and a small repertoire of figures. Jones filled the need for a record of these figures and served as a starting point for understanding the rapid development of the sport that occurred in Britain during the 19th century and was the first time the technical foundation of skating was described.

Jones was the first to characterize skating as an art form, although as Hines put it, he defined it as "correct skating technique employed for a limited body of figures" that could be taught to others. He covers the fundamentals of skating in the first part of the book, including the execution of inside and outside edges (which were "disdained" in England and Holland because critics thought that skaters executed them too often), running, and stopping. Once these fundamentals were learned and mastered, skaters could develop more advanced skills and the "more masterly parts of the art" of skating, including execution of figures. The latter part of the book describes the following more advanced skating moves: backward skating, spread eagles, spirals, inside and outside circles, the "Serpentine Line" (repeated change of edges on one foot), the "Salutation" (two skaters joining their hands when passing each other), and what Jones called a "figure of a heart on one leg", which later became a principal component of the three-turn. Jones' emphasis on arm positions, finishing each move, and the book's illustrations demonstrated that "the image skaters conveyed to onlookers was at least as important as accomplishing the moves". Although Jones described backward skating, which he called "whimsical", he saw no need for it, although he admitted that skaters were experimenting with it and one of the figures he described, a heart-shaped design, required it.

During Jones' time, skating was viewed as a recreational activity suitable only for men, but he saw no reason for the exclusion of women, writing that doing so was "the effect of prejudice and confined ideas", although he humorously said that skating allowed a woman to "indulge in a tête-à-tête with an acquaintance without provoking the jealousy of her husband with any prejudice to her repetition". Unlike later writers, Jones did not discuss the skating that women were doing separately, perhaps, as Hines suggests, because he viewed the skating of figures as a sport and therefore unsuitable for women. As a social activity, however, he viewed skating as part of the "long and established tradition of fun and courtship on the ice”, even though women during the 18th century were attempting the same figures as men. As Kestbaum states, "The participation of women in skating was thus conceived in terms of potential social advantages for innocent interaction between the sexes".

Jones also provided guidance on skate design in The Art of Skating. At the time, blades were attached to skaters' shoes with strings, straps, and clips. Jones' design was one of the first to firmly attach blades to the heels of shoes with screws. This attachment method made the blades a part of the shoes and prevented skaters from having to retie the blades and from the blades from falling off the shoes. He also recommended that skaters tie their skates at both the instep and heel, and warned against overtightening straps that would cause poor circulation and prevent their strings and straps stretching and breaking. He recommended the use of curved blades with less than two inches touching the ice. This design reduced friction and allowed for sharper turns. He also called for increased blade height, which allowed for deeper edges.

== Sodomy trial ==
"The Firework Macaroni" by Matthew Darly, published in 1772; possibly a caricature of Jones

In July 1772, Jones was convicted in the Old Bailey for sodomy against a boy named Francis Henry Hay, who was under thirteen years of age. Jones was found guilty based solely on the basis of the alleged victim's accusation, and that there was no medical evidence or corroboration of Hay's testimony in court. Jones was sentenced to death, but was held in Newgate Prison, and a month after his scheduled execution, King George III pardoned him on the condition that he go into exile (transportation). (Note: "His Majesty's pardon, on condition of transportation during life, hath been obtained for Capt. Robert Jones, a convict in Newgate. The terms upon which Mr. Jones (to speak in the language of some of the cabinet) the unfortunate man, who has been so maliciously accused, gets his pardon, are, that he transports himself for life to any one part of the world he thinks proper, in one month after his pleading it at the bar of the Old Bailey. The residence he has fixed on, we hear, is Florence, for which he has procured several letters, both of credit and re commendation, to many people of fashion there.") This leniency was met with criticism from both the press and public. The legal arguments made supporting Jones' pardon, which were discussed in several newspapers, revolved around Hay's consent and the fact that he was Jones' only accuser. Scholar Frances H. I. Henry claimed that Jones had the support of the British aristocracy, including Henry Howard, 12th Earl of Suffolk and one of the government's secretaries of state, and Chief Justice Lord Mansfield, who believed that Jones was found guilty based on insufficient evidence. A newspaper reported in June 1773 that Jones was living in Lyon in the South of France.

Jones' trial caused a stir in the press and from politicians including John Wilkes, who viewed the pardon as an example of government corruption because defendants like Jones, who had supporters within the government, were pardoned, but poor defendants often were not. The trial and pardon were discussed and debated in the popular press of the day, and summaries of the trial proceedings were reprinted in newspapers. The case resulted in the publication of a pamphlet entitled The State of the Case of Captain Jones, and the scandal was referred to in poetry and satires of the day. The Art of Skating was published during the trial, which most likely contributed to its sales.

Jones' case was the most widely discussed and reported case on homosexuality until Oscar Wilde's case one hundred years later. The newspapers of the time debated, largely due to Jones' notoriety, his guilt or innocence, even though there were other scandals about sodomy occurring at about the same time. Norton reported that the debate about the case ranged from advocating Christianity's intolerance of homosexuality to the defence of homosexual men "who were deemed to have an inborn propensity". The trial triggered public debate about sodomy, effeminacy, otherness, and what it meant to be English.

== Works ==
- A New Treatise on Artificial Fireworks (1765)
- The Art of Skating (1772)

== Works cited ==
- Hines, James R. (2006). Figure Skating: A History. Urbana, Illinois: University of Chicago Press. ISBN 0-252-07286-3.
- Hines, James R. (2015). Figure Skating in the Formative Years: Singles, Pairs, and the Expanding Role of Women. Urbana, Illinois: University of Chicago Press. ISBN 978-0252097041.
- Kestnbaum, Ellyn (2003). Culture on Ice: Figure Skating and Cultural Meaning. Middletown, Connecticut: Wesleyan University Press. ISBN 0-8195-6641-1.
