= Choctaw (disambiguation) =

The Choctaw are a Native American people.

Choctaw may also refer to:

- Choctaw language
- Choctaw Nation of Oklahoma
- Mississippi Band of Choctaw Indians

== Places ==
- Choctaw County, Alabama
- Choctaw National Wildlife Refuge, a wildlife refuge in Alabama
- Choctaw (Natchez, Mississippi), a historic house in Natchez On-Top-of-the-Hill Historic District
- Choctaw, Bolivar County, Mississippi
- Choctaw, Neshoba County, Mississippi
- Choctaw County, Mississippi
- Choctaw, Oklahoma, a suburb of Oklahoma City
- Choctaw County, Oklahoma

== Vehicles ==
- H-34 Choctaw, a helicopter
- SS Choctaw, a semi-whaleback ship that sank in 1915
- USS Choctaw (1856), an ironclad ram of the American Civil War
- USS Choctaw (1898), a tugboat in service from 1898 to 1940, renamed USS Wicomico in 1918
- USS Choctaw (AT-70), a tug in service from 1943 to 1947

== Other uses ==
- Choctaw Agency, Indian Territory
- Choctaw County School District, Mississippi
- Choctaw turn, a figure skating element
- Choctaw Club, headquarters of the Regular Democratic Organization

== See also ==
- Choctaw Corner
- Choctaw Corner, Alabama
- Choctaw Lake, Ohio, an unincorporated town in Ohio
- Choctaw, Oklahoma and Gulf Railroad, a predecessor line of the Rock Island
- Choctaw Rocket, a passenger train
- Jena Band of Choctaw Indians
- Mississippi Band of Choctaw Indians
- USS Choctaw, a list of ships
