= Compulsory figures =

Element in a figure skating competition

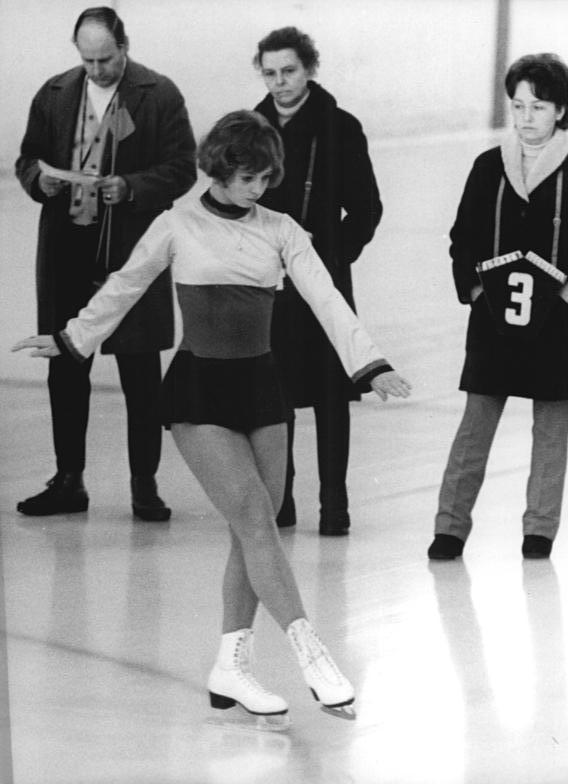
Sonja Morgenstern skates a compulsory figure.

Compulsory figures or school figures were formerly a segment of figure skating, and gave the sport its name. They are the "circular patterns which skaters trace on the ice to demonstrate skill in placing clean turns evenly on round circles". For approximately the first 50 years of figure skating as a sport, until 1947, compulsory figures made up 60 percent of the total score at most competitions around the world. These figures continued to dominate the sport, although they steadily declined in importance, until the International Skating Union (ISU) voted to discontinue them as a part of competitions in 1990. Learning and training in compulsory figures instilled discipline and control; some in the figure skating community considered them necessary to teach skaters basic skills. Skaters would train for hours to learn and execute them well, and competing and judging figures would often take up to eight hours during competitions.

Skaters traced compulsory figures and were judged according to their smoothness and accuracy. The circle is the basis of all figures. Other elements in compulsory figures include curves, change of foot, change of edge, and turns. Skaters had to trace precise circles while completing difficult turns and edges. The simple "figure eight" shape was executed by connecting two circles; other figures included the three turn, the counter turn, the rocker turn, the bracket turn, and the loop.

Although few skaters continue to practice compulsory figures, and few coaches still teach them to skaters, some skaters and coaches believe compulsory figures give skaters an advantage in developing alignment, core strength, body control, and discipline. The World Figure Sport Society has conducted festivals and competitions of compulsory figures, endorsed by the Ice Skating Institute, since 2015.

== History ==
=== Early history ===
Tracing figures in the ice is the oldest form of figure skating, especially during its first 200 years of existence, when it was a recreational activity practiced mostly by men. Combined skating, or "patterns of moves for two skaters around a common center marked by a ball and later an orange placed on the ice", had a "profound historical significance" to the sport that eventually manifested itself in ice dancing, pair skating, and synchronized skating, and dominated the sport for 50 years in England during the 18th century. The Art of Skating, one of the earliest books about figure skating, was written by Robert Jones in 1772 and described five advanced figures, three of which were illustrated with large color plates. Jones' limited body of figures, which emphasized correct technique, were the accepted and basic repertoire of figures in 18th-century England. The Edinburgh Skating Club, one of the oldest skating clubs in the world, described combined figures and those done by multiple skaters; interlocking figure eights were the most important. According to writer Ellyn Kestnbaum, the Edinburgh Skating Club required prospective members to pass proficiency tests in what became compulsory figures. The London Skating Club, founded in 1830 in London, also required proficiency tests for members and pioneered combined skating, which contributed to the evolution of school figures. Artistic skating in France, which was derived from the English style of figure skating and was influenced by ballet, developed figures that emphasized artistry, body position, and grace of execution. Jean Garcin, a member of an elite group of skaters in France, wrote a book about figure skating in 1813 that included descriptions and illustrations of over 30 figures, including a series of circle-eight figures that skaters still use today.

George Anderson, writing in 1852, described backward-skating figures, including the flying Mercury and the shamrock, as well as the Q figure, which became, in its various forms, an important part of the repertoire of skating movements for the rest of the 1800s. Anderson also described two combined figures, the salutation (already described by Jones) and the satellite. By the 1850s, the most important figures (eights, threes, and Qs) were developed and formed the basis for figure skating at the time. In 1869, Henry Vandervell and T. Maxwell Witham from the London Skating Club wrote System of Figure Skating, which described variations of the three turn (the only figure known before 1860), the bracket (first done on roller skates), the rocker, the Mohawk, the loop, the Q, and other figures. The Mohawk, renamed in Canada to the C Step in 2020, a two-foot turn on the same circle, most likely originated in North America. Figure skating historian James Hines called the grapevine, which was probably invented in Canada, "the most American of all figures". The Viennese style of figure skating, as described by Max Wirth's book in 1881, described connecting figures, which ultimately led to modern free skating programs.

In 1868, the American Skating Congress, precursor to U.S. Figure Skating, adopted a series of movements used during competitions between skaters from the U.S. and Canada. Until 1947, for approximately the first 50 years of the existence of figure skating as a sport, compulsory figures made up 60 percent of the total score at most competitions around the world. Other competitions held in the late 19th and early 20th centuries included special figures, free skating, and compulsories, with most of the points they earned going towards how they performed the same set of compulsory moves. The first international figure skating competition was in Vienna in 1882; according to Kestnbaum, it established a precedent for future competitions. Skaters were required to perform 23 compulsory figures, as well as a four-minute free skating program and a section called "special figures", in which they had to perform moves or combinations of moves that highlighted their advanced skills.

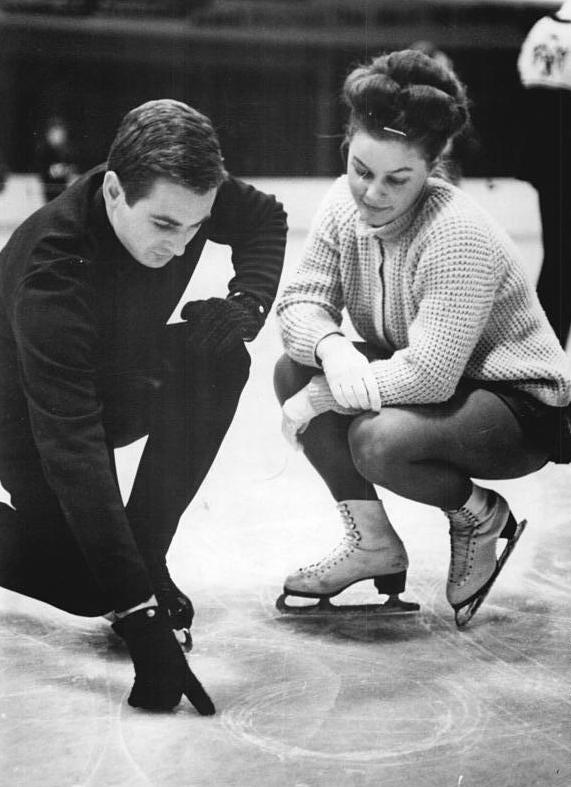
Ralph Borghardt and Gabriele Seyfert examine the print of a loop figure at the 1964 East German Championships.

Compulsory figures were an important part of figure skating for the rest of the 19th century until the 1930s and 1940s. The first European Championships in 1891 consisted of only compulsory figures. In 1896, the newly formed International Skating Union (ISU) sponsored the first annual World Figure Skating Championships in St. Petersburg. The competition consisted of compulsory figures and free skating. Skaters had to perform six compulsory moves so that judges could compare skaters according to an established standard. Compulsory figures were worth 60 percent of the competitors' total scores.

Special figures were not included in World Championships, although they were included as a separate discipline in other competitions, including the Olympics in 1908. The early Olympics movement valued and required amateurism, so figure skating, almost from its beginnings as an organized sport, was also associated with amateurism. Athletes were unable to support themselves financially, so as Kestnbaum put it, "thus making it impossible for those who had to earn a living by other means to attain the same level of skill as those who were independently wealthy or who practiced professions that allowed for flexible scheduling". According to Kestnbaum, this had implications for attaining proficiency in compulsory figures, which required long hours of practice and purchasing time at private rinks and clubs.

In 1897, the ISU adopted a schedule of 41 school figures, each of increasing difficulty, which was proposed by the British. They remained the standard compulsory figures used throughout the world in proficiency testing and competitions until 1990, and U.S. Figure Skating continued to use them as a separate discipline in the 1990s. After World War II, more countries were sending skaters to international competitions, so the ISU cut the number of figures to a maximum of six due to the extended time it took to judge them all. The first judges' handbook for compulsory figures was published by the ISU in 1961.

=== Demise in 1990 and modern renaissance in 2015 ===
The demise and revival of compulsory figures occurred, respectively, in 1990, when the ISU removed compulsory figures from international single skating competitions, and beginning in 2015, when the first competition focusing entirely on figures took place. Judging scandals and the broadcasts of figure skating on television have been cited as the reason for the decline of figures. The U.S. was the last country to include figures in its competitions until 1999. The elimination of figures resulted in an increase of focus on the free skating segment and in the domination of younger girls in the sport. Most skaters stopped training with figures, although many coaches continued to teach figures and skaters continued to practice them because figures taught basic skating skills and gave skaters an advantage in developing alignment, core strength, body control, and discipline.

A revival of compulsory figures began in 2015. The first World Figure Championships (renamed to The World Figure and Fancy Skating Championships in 2017) occurred in Lake Placid, New York. By 2023, nine championships had taken place. Judging was done blind, after the skaters left the ice, and without the judges knowing which competitor completed which figure. Karen Courtland Kelly, 1994 Olympian and figures expert, who founded the World Figure Sport Society (WFSS) and organized its figures championships, was credited with revitalizing figures. By 2020, the championship and the revitalization of figures were supported by many skaters, including U.S. Olympian Debi Thomas, who competed at the 2023 Championships. Since its inception, The World Figure Sport Society has held 11 championships, out of which the most successful competitors are Shepherd Clark, with nine gold medals and two silvers, and Jill Albrecht with three gold medals and one bronze. The event is considered to be the most comprehensive figure event ever held, as it is a blend of historic figures, as well as new figures the competitors perform, as skating artists, with Fancy Skating, the final event, all on black ice, where the actual tracings may be seen clearly, so that the Fancy portion includes the visible evaluation of the smoothness of the patterns, positions, with emphasis upon a moving sculptural aesthetic. The "6.0" has been used in the event, to preserve that aspect of Figure Skating's history.

== Execution of figures ==
Compulsory figures, also called school figures, are the "circular patterns which skaters trace on the ice to demonstrate skill in placing clean turns evenly on round circles". (Note: See the historical document "Special Regulations for Figures" for an example of past competition rules and regulations for figures. See especially diagrams of figures, pp. 12–21.) Compulsory figures are also called "patch", a reference to the patch of ice allocated to each skater to practice figures. Figure skating historian James Hines reports that compulsory figures were "viewed as a means of developing technique necessary for elite skaters". He states, "As scales are the material by which musicians develop the facile technique required to perform major competitions, so compulsory figures were viewed as the material by which skaters develop the facile required for free-skating programs". Compulsory figures has been called "the slow-sports movement" or "yoga on ice". Hines also states that although compulsory figures and free skating are often considered as "totally different aspects of figure skating", historically they were not, and insisted that "spirals, spread eagles, jumps, and spins were originally individual figures".

Skaters were required to trace these circles using one foot at a time, demonstrating their mastery of control, balance, flow, and edge to execute accurate and clean tracings on the ice. The compulsory figures used by the International Skating Union (ISU) in 1897 for international competitions consisted of "two or three tangent circles with one, one and a half, or two full circles skated on each foot, in some with turns or loops included on the circles". The patterns skaters left on the ice, rather than the shapes the body made executing them, became the focus of artistic expression in figure skating into the 20th century. The quality of the figures, along with the skater's form, carriage, and speed in which they were executed, was emphasized, not the intricacy of unique designs of the figures themselves. Skaters had to execute figures by positioning themselves to precisely control the edges of one blade of their skates by leaning in or out, moving forward or backward. They also had to use their right or left foot while balancing the other foot in order to avoid going off course; then they had to repeat everything five more times. Louise Radnofsky stated, "Controlling the trails a skate blade leaves requires timing, precision, body awareness, nailing an upper body turn without throwing the lower body off, tolerating punishing burn on the muscles of one leg". Olympic bronze medalist Debi Thomas stated, about the execution of figures, "It takes incredible strength and control. You are literally using every single muscle in your body. It looks slow and easy, but it's not … but if you lay out a great figure, it’s an amazing feeling".

The highest quality figures had tracings on top of each other; their edges were placed precisely, and the turns lined up exactly. The slightest misalignment or shift of body weight could cause errors in the execution of figures. American figure skating champion Irving Brokaw insisted that form was more essential to the production of figures than the tracings themselves because the skater needed to find a comfortable and natural position in which to perform them. He expected skaters to trace figures without looking down at them because it gave "a very slovenly appearance" and recommended that they not use their arms excessively or for balance like tightrope walkers. Brokaw wanted skaters to remain upright and avoid bending over as much as they could. Brokaw also thought that the unemployed leg, which he called the "balance leg", was as important as the tracing leg because it was used as much in the execution of a figure as the tracing leg. The balance leg should also be bent only slightly, as he believed that bending it too much would remove its usefulness and make it appear clumsy.

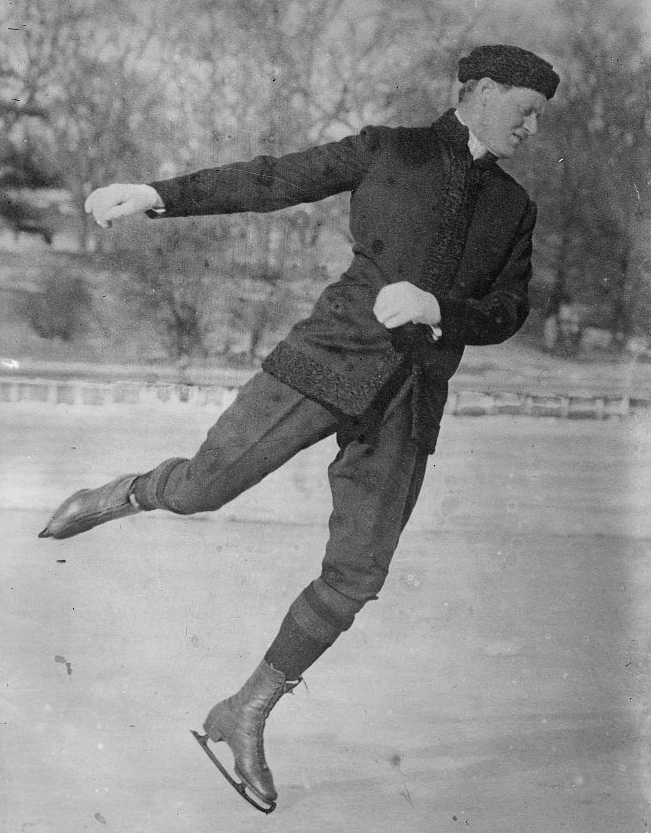
American Olympic figure skater Irving Brokaw, who wrote one of the earliest books about figure skating and compulsory figures, The Art of Skating (1915)

Writer Ellyn Kestnbaum notes that skaters who were adept at performing compulsory figures had to practice for hours to have precise body control and to become "intimately familiar with how subtle shifts in the body's balance over the blade affected the tracings left on the ice". She adds that many skaters found figures and their visible results calming and rewarding. Sports writer Christie Sausa insists that training in figures "helps create better skaters and instills discipline, and can be practiced over a lifetime by skaters of all ages and abilities". As Louise Radnofsky put it, for skaters that practiced figures, "there's joy in the frustration of never achieving perfection, zen in repetition, inclusivity in voluntarily doing something that generations of skaters complained about -- and, for once in a child-driven sport, superiority in maturity". The German magazine Der Spiegel declared in 1983 that compulsory figures stifled skaters' creativity because not much about figures had changed in 100 years of competitions.

=== Figure elements ===
All compulsory figures had the following: circles, curves, change of foot, change of edge, and turns. The circle, the basis of all figures, was performed on both its long and short axes. Skaters had to trace precise circles while completing difficult turns and edges. Most figures employ "specific one-foot turns not done in combination with other one-foot turns". Each figure consisted of two or three tangent circles. Each circle's diameter had to be about three times the skater's height, (Note: 5 to 7 metres (16 ft 5 in to 23 ft 0 in)) and the radii of all half-circles had to be approximately the same length. Half-circles and circles had to begin and end as near as possible to the point at which the long and short axes intersected. The figure's long axis divided it longitudinally into equal-sized halves, and the figure's short axes divided the figures into equal-sized lobes.

Curves, which are parts of circles, had to be performed with an uninterrupted tracing and with a single clean edge, with no subcurves or wobbles. Brokaw insists that curves had to be done on all four edges of the skate while skating both backwards and forwards. He states, "It is the control of these circles that gives strength and power, and the holding of the body in the proper and graceful attitudes, while it is the execution of these large circles, changes of edges, threes and double-threes, brackets, loops, rockers and counters, which makes up the art of skating". Curves also included the forced turn (or bracket) and the serpentine.

A change of foot, which happened during the short time the skater transferred weight from one foot to the other, was allowed in the execution of figures, but had to be done in a symmetrical zone on each side of the long axis. Skaters could choose the exact point at which they placed their foot in this zone, although it typically was just after the long axis, with the full weight of the body on the skate. It was at this point that tracing began. A change of edge happened at the point where the long and short axes intersected. Its trace had to be continuously and symmetrically traced and could not be S-shaped. The edge change had to be as short as possible, and could not be longer than the length of the skate blade. (Note: 30 to 40 centimetres (12 to 16 in)) Turns were skated with a single clean edge up to and after the turn, but with no double tracings, no skids or scrapes, or no illegal edge change either before, during, or after a turn. The turns' cusps had to be the same size, and the entry into and out of a turn had to be symmetrical.

The simple "figure eight" shape was executed by connecting two circles "about three times the height of the skater (Note: 5 to 7 metres (16 ft 5 in to 23 ft 0 in)) with one circle skated on each foot". The figure eight has four variations: inside edges, outside edges, backward, and forward. A turn added at the halfway point of each circle increased the level of complexity. Other figures included three-lobed figures with a counter turn or a rocker turn, which were completed at the points where the lobes touched. Counters and rockers had to be executed symmetrically, with no change of edge, with the points of their turns either pointing up or down or lying along the figure's long axis, and could not be beaked or hooked. Brackets, like threes, had to be skated on a circle, their turns' points either pointing up or down or lying along the figure's long axis.

Skaters also performed a group of smaller figures called loops. The diameter of the loop's circular shape had to be about the height of the skater, and they could not have any scrapes or points on the ice. The point at which the skater entered into or exited out of the crossing of both the loop tracing and the center of the loop had to sit on the figure's long axis, where the loop was divided into symmetrical halves. The center of the loop figure to the place in which the skater entered into or exited out of the loop's crossing had to measure five-sixths of the circle's diameter. The loop's length had to be about one-third of the distance from the point where the skater entered into or exited out of the loop's crossing of the loop tracing to the figure's short axis. The loop's width had to be about two-thirds of its length. The Q figure begins at the tail of the figure, on the skater's outside edge. It can also begin on any of the four edges, and the direction in which it can be skated can be reversed. When the circle is skated first, it is called a reverse Q. Altered forms of the Q figure often do not look like the letter "q", but "simply employ a serpentine line and a three turn". United shamrocks, spectacles (shapes that trace the shape of eyeglasses), and united roses are alterations of the basic Q figures.

Since the goal of figures is drawing an exact shape on the ice, the skater had to concentrate on the depth of the turn (how much the turn extends into or out of the circle), the integrity of the edges and cusps (round-patterned edges leading into or out of the circle), and its shape. There were three types of three turns: the standard three, the double three, and the paragraph double three. The three turn had to be skated on a circle, its turns' points either pointing up or down or lying along the figure's long axis. For the double three, the points of both threes had to be directed towards the center of each circle, and had to divide the circle into three equal curves. The middle curve had to divide the circles into halves by the figure's long axis. The paragraph double three, which was executed at the highest levels of competition, was done by tracing "two circles with two turns at each circle, all on one foot from one push-off". The paragraph double three was difficult to accomplish because the shape and placement of the turns had to be perfectly symmetrical, the turns had to be done on a true edge with no scrapes on the ice, and the circles had to be the same size and exactly round. All combined compulsory figures are illustrated below:

The figure-eight

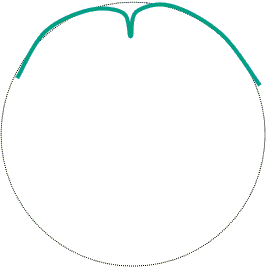
The 3 turn

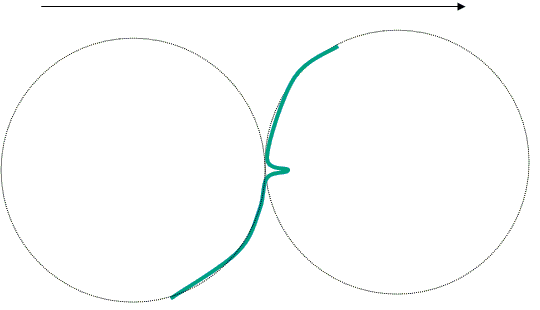
The counter turn

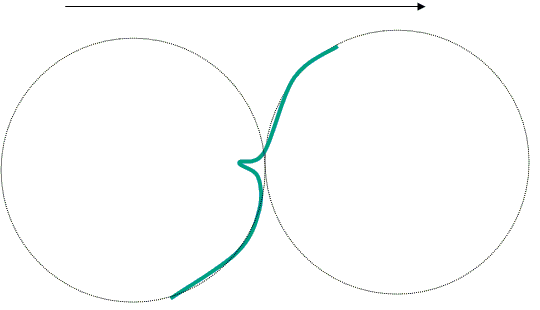
The rocker turn

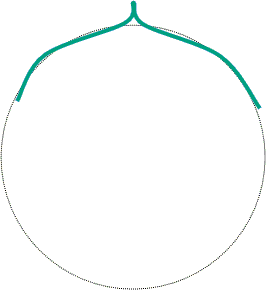
The bracket turn

The loop

== Judging ==
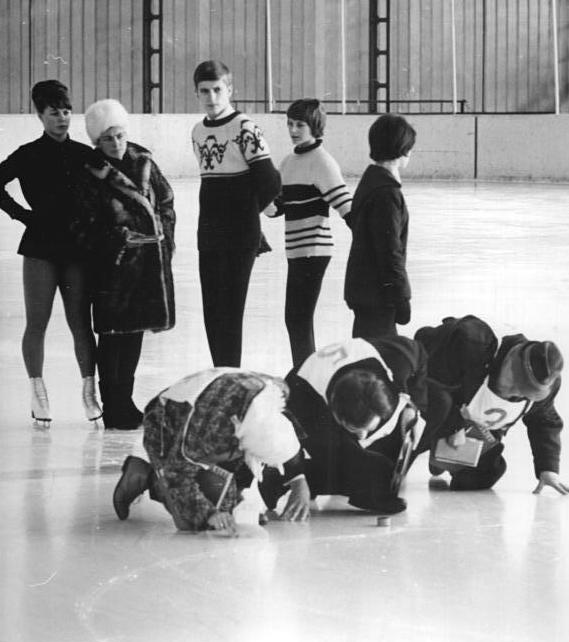
Compulsory figures judging (Berlin, Germany, in 1964)

Der Spiegel compared judging compulsory figures to the work of forensic scientists. After the skaters completed tracing figures, the judges scrutinized the circles made, and the process was repeated twice more. According to Randy Harvey, compulsory figures took five hours to complete at U.S. National Championships and eight hours at World Championships. At the 1983 European Championships, the compulsory segment began at 8 am and lasted six hours. According to Louise Radnofsky, who claimed that the execution of figures could be "very boring—and worse to watch", the most exciting physical move was a change of direction. Radnofsky also stated, "Results of a performance were generally visible only to skaters and judges before being swept away".

The ISU published the first judges' handbook for during compulsory figure competitions in 1961. Skaters were judged on the ease and flow of their movement around the circles, the accuracy of the shapes of their bodies, and the accuracy of the prints traced on the ice. Judges took note of the following: scrapes, double tracks that indicated that both edges of their blades were in contact with the ice simultaneously, deviations from a perfect circle, how closely the tracings from each repetition followed each other, how well the loops lined up, and other errors.

Judges were meant to begin with a perfect 6.0 score and deduct different amounts for different degrees of error; for example, a 1970 handbook by US Figure Skating indicated that a shallow turn might be a "minor" fault worth a 0.1 deduction, while a badly distorted loop turn might be a "major plus" fault worth a deduction of 0.5. Some errors were difficult to see in the final tracing, especially if the lighting was poor, or only visible while the skater was performing the figure.

== Works cited ==
- Brokaw, Irving (1915). The Art of Skating. New York: American Sports Publishing Company.
- Hines, James R. (2006). Figure Skating: A History. Urbana, Illinois: University of Chicago Press. ISBN 0-252-07286-3.
- Hines, James R. (2011). Historical Dictionary of Figure Skating. Lanham, Maryland: Scarecrow Press. ISBN 978-0-8108-6859-5.
- Kestnbaum, Ellyn (2003). Culture on Ice: Figure Skating and Cultural Meaning. Middletown, Connecticut: Wesleyan University Press. ISBN 978-0819566416.
- Petkevich, John Misha (1988). Sports Illustrated Figure Skating: Championship Techniques (1st ed.). New York: Sports Illustrated. ISBN 978-1-4616-6440-6. OCLC 815289537.
- "Special Regulations for Figures" (PDF). U.S. Figure Skating Association. Archived from the original (PDF) on 1 July 2025.
