= USS Choctaw =

Five ships of the United States Navy have been named USS Choctaw, after the Choctaw tribe;

- USS Choctaw (1856), an ironclad ram of the American Civil War
- USS Choctaw (1898), a tugboat in service from 1898 to 1940, renamed USS Wicomico in 1918
- USS Choctaw (1918), a cargo ship in service during 1918 and 1919
- USS Choctaw (1926), a tug (YT-114), ex-Sampson, was acquired from the United States Shipping Board on 22 June 1926, and placed in service the following day. She performed towing and miscellaneous services in the 5th Naval District until 1 June 1933 when she arrived at Philadelphia. She was placed out of service there on 15 July 1933 and sold on 25 January 1937.
- USS Choctaw (AT-70), a tug in service from 1943 to 1947

== See also ==
- USNS Choctaw County, a US Navy Spearhead-class expeditionary fast transport in service since 2013. She was named for three different counties from three different US States, but all named for the Choctaw tribe.
- SS Choctaw, an American freighter that operated on the Great Lakes
