= USS Huron (PF-19) =

Tacoma-class frigate in the United States Navy

History

United States
- Name: Huron
- Namesake: City of Huron, South Dakota
- Builder: American Ship Building Company, Lorain, Ohio
- Launched: 3 July 1943
- Commissioned: 7 September 1944
- Decommissioned: 19 April 1946
- Fate: Sold for scrapping, 15 May 1947

General characteristics
- Class & type: Tacoma-class frigate
- Displacement: 1,430 long tons (1,453 t) light; 2,415 long tons (2,454 t) full
- Length: 303 ft 11 in (92.63 m)
- Beam: 37 ft 11 in (11.56 m)
- Draft: 13 ft 8 in (4.17 m)
- Propulsion: 2 × 5,500 shp (4,101 kW) turbines; 3 boilers; 2 shafts
- Speed: 20 knots (37 km/h; 23 mph)
- Complement: 190
- Armament: 3 × 3"/50 dual purpose guns (3x1); 4 x 40 mm guns (2×2); 9 × 20 mm guns (9×1); 1 × Hedgehog anti-submarine mortar; 8 × Y-gun depth charge projectors; 2 × Depth charge tracks

USS Huron (PF-19), a Tacoma-class frigate, was the second ship of the United States Navy to be named for Huron, South Dakota.

== Construction ==
The fifth Huron (PF-19), originally classified as PG-127, was launched under Maritime Commission contract by the American Ship Building Company in Cleveland, Ohio, on 3 July 1943, sponsored by Mrs. J. S. Tschetter, wife of the mayor of Huron, South Dakota; and commissioned on 7 September 1944.

== Service history ==
Crewed by the Coast Guard, Huron conducted shakedown training off Bermuda during October and November. Returning to Norfolk, Virginia, the ship sailed with a convoy bound from Norfolk to North Africa on 1 December 1944. While bringing together merchant ships which had become separated during the night, Huron was rammed by SS James Fenimore Cooper shortly after midnight on 8 December. Though the engine room flooded rapidly, the ship's damage control work was timely and skillful, keeping her afloat. After temporary repairs, Huron was towed through rough weather by Choctaw (AT-70), arriving at Bermuda on 15 December 1944. From there she was taken to Charleston, South Carolina, for conversion to a sonar training ship.

Huron arrived at Key West, Florida, on 22 February 1945 for training operations at the Fleet Sonar School. She spent the remainder of the war providing both technical and tactical anti-submarine training for officers and men. She collided with the Free French Naval Forces submarine Argo on 28 April 1945 off Key West while Argo was serving as an antisubmarine warfare training target, damaging both of Argo′s periscopes.

Huron departed Key West for Norfolk on 19 March 1946 and was decommissioned there on 19 April 1946. She was sold to United Dock Corporation on 15 May 1947. She was resold to Brazil in 1947 as Jose Marcelino and scrapped.
