= Glossary of figure skating terms =

The following is a glossary of figure skating terms, sorted alphabetically.

== 0–9 ==
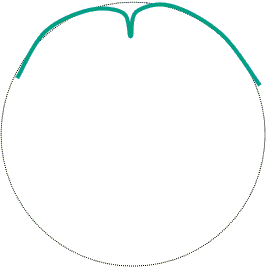
A 3 turn

3 turn
Also three turn. A one-foot turn with a change of edge that results in a '3' shape traced on the ice
4CC
An abbreviation for the Four Continents Figure Skating Championships
6.0 system
The old scoring system used in competitions until 2004, in which skaters were scored relative to each other. The lowest score was a 0.0 and the highest was a 6.0.

== A ==
A
The scoring abbreviation for the Axel jump
age-eligible
Either "old enough" or "young enough" to compete internationally at a certain level. Skaters who have turned 13 but not yet 19 (21 for the man in pairs and ice dance) before the July 1 when a new season begins are eligible to compete in Junior-level events for the whole season. Skaters who have turned 15 prior to that date in their place of birth are age-eligible for Senior-level events. The overlap in age eligibility allows for some senior age-eligible skaters to compete at Junior level events, and some junior age-eligible skaters to compete at Senior level events.
attitude
A leg position in which the free leg is lifted behind the body, with the knee bent at an angle, and held behind at a 90-degree angle to the skating foot. This is the leg position often used for the layback spin.
arabesque
A leg position in which the free leg is extended behind the body in a straight line. This is the leg position used for the basic camel spin.
Axel jump
The only rotational jump counted as a jump element that starts with a forward approach. An Axel jump has an extra half rotation (180 degrees), and is landed with the skater gliding backwards (as is the case with all rotational jumps). It was named after Axel Paulsen. You can see it performed in this video by USA Olympian, Jason Brown.

== B ==
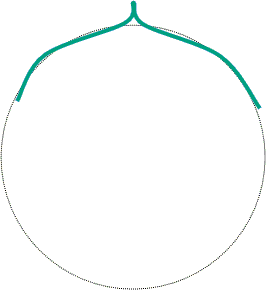
A bracket turn

Biellmann spin

backflip
A reverse somersault in the air. Backflips were banned in competition until 2024.
backspin
A spin performed on a back outside edge
base value
A part of the ISU Judging System – a numeric value assigned to each technical element in a skater's program, designed to standardize the elements' potential scores in an attempt to make judging more impartial
Besti squat
A spread eagle-like move where the skater glides on two outside edges with knees bent. Named after Natalia Bestemianova.
BiDs
Abbreviation for "backward inside death spiral"
Biellmann spin
A catch-foot position where the free leg is pulled above the head from behind. Can be either a spin or a spiral position. By regulation, a spin becomes a Biellmann at the moment the skate passes over the level of the head. Named after Denise Biellmann, who popularized the position but did not invent it.
boards
The vertical barrier between the ice and the ground at the point where the ice ends. In non-Olympic competitions, the boards are usually covered with advertisements for the sponsors. At the Olympics, they are usually covered by designs or the Olympic logo.
BoDs
Abbreviation for "backward outside death spiral"
bracket turn
A one-foot turn with a change of edge that results in a '}' shape traced on the ice
bunny hop
A simple non-rotational jump performed while skating in a straight line.
butterfly jump
A flying spin with a two-foot takeoff, in which the body goes almost parallel to the ice in the air, with a scissoring leg motion
bye
Permission to compete in a higher level of competition without having competed in the requisite qualifying competition

== C ==
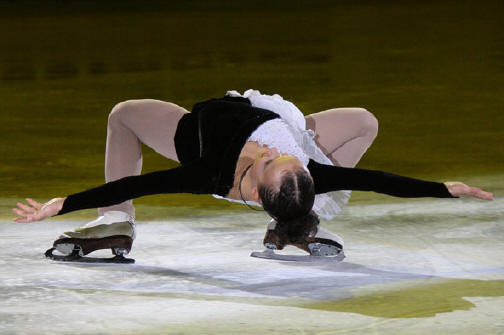
A cantilever with the hands extended

CD
The scoring abbreviation for the compulsory dance in an ice dance competition
COP
An abbreviation for Code of Points
CSp
The scoring abbreviation for the camel spin
camel spin
A spin position with the free leg extended in the air in an arabesque position parallel to the ice
cantilever
An element in which the knees are bent and the back is bent backwards, parallel to the ice. The element can be performed with the hands on the ice or extended in the air.

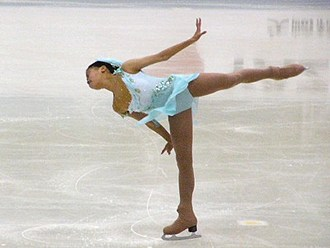
A camel position

carry lift
A lift without rotation
catch-foot
A spin or spiral position in which the free leg is held by one or both hands. The most notable catch-foot position is the Biellmann.
centered
A spin that stays in one spot on the ice – the opposite of traveling
chack
Also chacked, chacking. When a medal-winning or otherwise noteworthy program is not shown on television. This term is named after Michael Chack, whose bronze medal winning performance at the U.S. Championships was not aired on television.
change-foot spin
A spin that changes position from a back inside edge (forward spin) on one foot to a back outside edge (backspin) on the other foot (or vice versa), while retaining the same rotational direction
chasse
An ice dance step that can be a simple chasse, a crossed chasse, or a slide chasse
check
Stopping the rotation of a jump or a spin by use of arms and shoulder as a counter-rotation
cherry-flip
Another name for the toe loop jump
cheated
A jump that was not fully rotated in midair, with either the first rotation starting on the ice or the final rotation finishing after the landing
choctaw turn
A two-foot turn with a change of edge that results in a change of lobe
Charlotte spiral
Also candlestick spiral. A spiral position in which the torso is bent down towards the skating leg, with the free leg held in a 180 degree vertical split position.
Code of Points
An informal name for the ISU Judging System
combination
Two or more elements (jumps, spin positions) performed in succession. See jump combination, spin combination.
combination lift
A lift combining two short lifts
compulsory dance
Formerly, the first of three segments in an ice dance competition. All teams performed the same dance to the standard music. In 2010, the ISU eliminated the compulsory and original dances and merged them into the short dance. The compulsory portion is now officially known as the pattern dance.
compulsory figures
Also school figures. Specific patterns traced on the ice by a skater's blade. While originally a major part of a skating competition, figures were removed entirely from international competition in 1990.

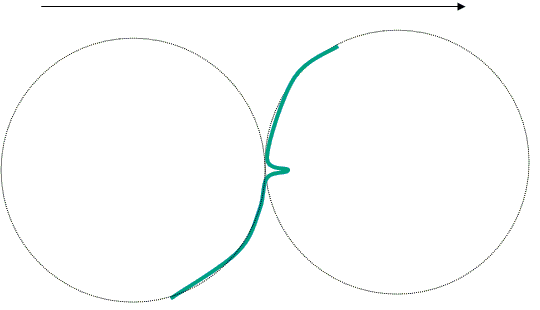
A counter turn

counter turn
A one-foot turn with entry and exit on the same edge but which results in a change of lobe with the rotation outside the original lobe. Compare with rocker turn.
cross roll
In ice dance, a series of two outside edges across two steps connected by a cross stroke, by which the free foot is crossed over the skating foot before being placed on the ice for the second step
cross stroke
An ice dance step that begins with the feet crossed, the legs crossing above the knee, so the motion is begun by the outside edge of the free foot
crossed chasse
In ice dance, a series of two edges across two steps (such as inside and outside). On the second step, the free foot crosses the skating foot and is placed on the ice beside the skating foot.
crossed step behind
An ice dance step that is begun with the free foot in the air. It is then crossed below the knee to the opposite side of the skating foot, so that the free foot touches down on the ice on the outside edge of the skating foot. The leg is crossed behind.
crossed step forward
An ice dance step that is begun with the free foot in the air. It is then crossed below the knee to the opposite side of the skating foot, so that the free foot touches down on the ice on the outside edge of the skating foot. The leg is crossed in front.
crossover
Crossing one foot over the other while skating along a curve, as a way of gaining speed and turning corners; may be performed while skating either forwards or backwards
crouch
A two-foot skating move in which the skater's legs are both bent by at least 90 degrees
curve lift
A type of dance lift in which the lifter moves along a curve across the ice; the lift may be performed on one foot or two.

== D ==
A death spiral with the woman on a back inside edge

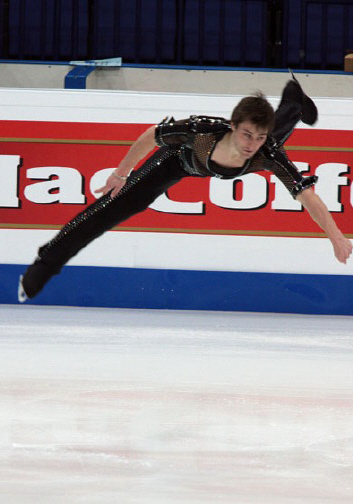
Death drop

dance
See ice dance
dance jump
In ice dance, a small jump used to change foot or direction, performed by both partners while in hold or while very close together
dance lift
In ice dance, a type of lift where the lifter may not raise his arms above his shoulders
dance spin
In ice dance, a spin performed by both partners while in hold, similar to a pair spin
death drop
A type of flying entry into a spin
death spiral
An element in pair skating in which the lady skates on a deep edge with her body close to the ice, and skates in a circle around the man who is in a low pivot position and holding her by the arm.
discipline
A part of ice skating governed by unique rules. Currently, the four disciplines that compete at the Olympic Games are men's singles, ladies' singles, pair skating, and ice dance.
double
A jump with two full rotations (720 degrees) in the air; the double Axel requires the skater to complete 2.5 revolutions (900 degrees).
downgraded
A jump or throw jump where the element is missing a half rotation or more
drag
Another name for a lunge
draw
The act of choosing the starting order before an event – may be either open (public) or closed (private).

== E ==
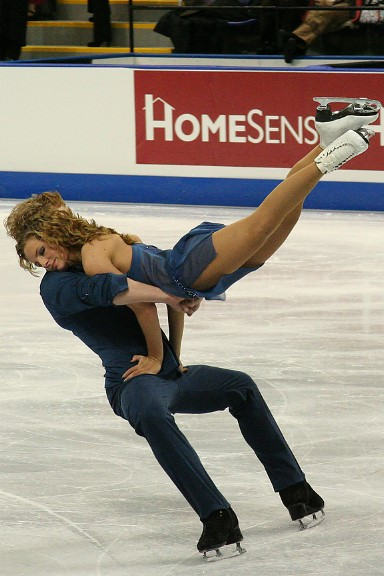
A male ice dancer achieves a deep outside edge while performing a lift.

element
An identifiable component of a program; includes spins, spirals, jumps, footwork, lifts, etc.
eligible
A skater who earns money solely from ISU-approved competitions and exhibitions. Only eligible skaters may compete in the Olympic Games.
edge
May refer either to part of the skate blade, or the result of skating on that part. May be either inside (towards the body) or outside (away from the body), and either forward or backward, giving a total of four different edges: forward inside, forward outside, backward inside, backward outside. A "deep edge" is a steep lean on the edge of the skate – deep edges are rewarded, while skating on a "flat" (on both edges at the same time) is discouraged.
edge jump
A general term to refer to any rotational jump that takes off from an edge; the three edge jumps that count as jump elements are the Axel, the loop, and the Salchow
edge violation
Performing a rotational jump on the wrong edge
European Figure Skating Championships
An ISU Championship for skaters from European countries
Europeans
An informal name for the European Figure Skating Championships
exhibition
Non-competition skating or a show, for example, the gala after a competition in which the highest placing skaters perform a show program. Exhibitions often feature elements banned in competition as well as spotlights and show lighting.
extension
The way in which a part of the body is held in a stretched position

== F ==
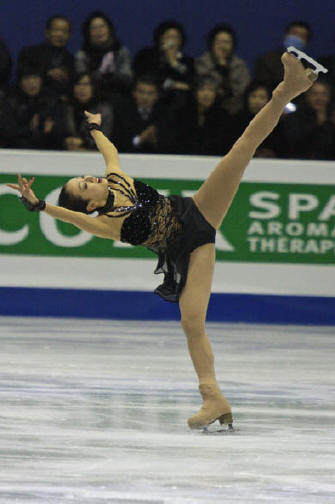
A fan spiral (side view)

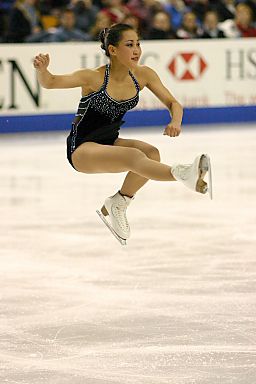
A flying sit spin in mid-air

F
The scoring abbreviation for the flip jump
FD
The scoring abbreviation for the free dance program in an ice dance competition
FS
The scoring abbreviation for the free skating program in a singles and pairs competition
fan spiral
A spiral position in which the free leg is lifted, held upwards in front of the body, and lowered, in the style of an opening and closing Japanese fan
FiDs
Abbreviation for "forward inside death spiral"
field moves
See moves in the field
figures
See compulsory figures
flat
Skating on both edges at the same time; generally less desirable than skating on one edge
flight
Also warm-up group. A grouping of skaters at a competition who warm up together immediately prior to competing. The final flight of the free skating in single skating is made up of the highest-scoring six skaters from the short program.
flip jump
A toe jump that takes off from a back inside edge and lands on the back outside edge of the opposite foot. You can see it performed in this video by USA Olympian, Jason Brown.
flood
(verb) to resurface the ice
flutz
A portmanteau of "flip" and "Lutz", for an improperly executed Lutz jump, where the outside take-off edge is mistakenly changed to an inside edge, making it a flip jump
flying spin
A jump that lands in a spinning position. Those commonly performed include flying camel spins and flying sit spins.
FoDs
Abbreviation for "forward outside death spiral"
forward spin
A spin performed on a back inside edge
free dance
Formerly, the third and final segment of an ice dance competition; as of 2010, the second and final segment of an ice dance competition. The free dance is a creative dance program that expresses the character/rhythm(s) of the music chosen by the couple.
free leg
Also free foot. The leg (or foot) that is not on the ice
free skating
Also free skate, free program. The second of the two programs performed by singles and pair skaters at a competition, unofficially known as the long program. Historically, a term for the segment of a figure skating competition that was not compulsory figures.
Four Continents Figure Skating Championships
An ISU Championship for skaters from non-European countries
footwork sequence
A sequence of edges, turns, and hops – often a required element

== G ==
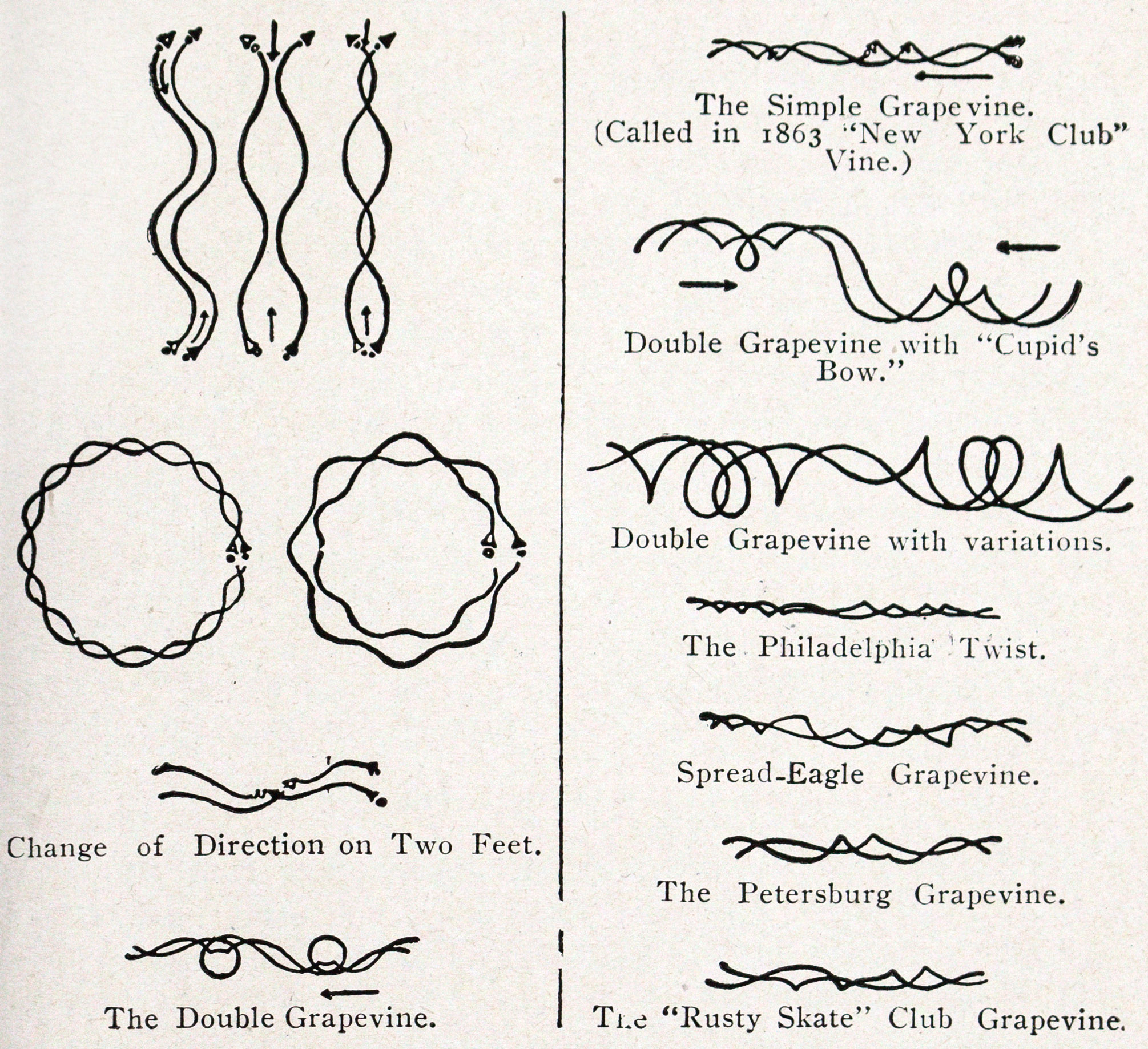
Illustration of the ice tracings of various grapevine figures

GP
An abbreviation for a Grand Prix event
GPF
An abbreviation for the Grand Prix of Figure Skating Final
GOE
An abbreviation for Grade Of Execution
gold medalist
In addition to referring to the winner of a particular figure skating competition, all skaters who have passed the USFSA's highest-level skill tests are called "gold medalists"; the latter usage is especially common on coaches' resumes.
Grade Of Execution
A part of the ISU Judging System – a measure of how well a skater is judged to have performed individual elements of a program
grapevines
Figures performed on two feet
Grand Prix
A series of six international invitational events that build to the Grand Prix Final. See ISU Grand Prix of Figure Skating

== H ==
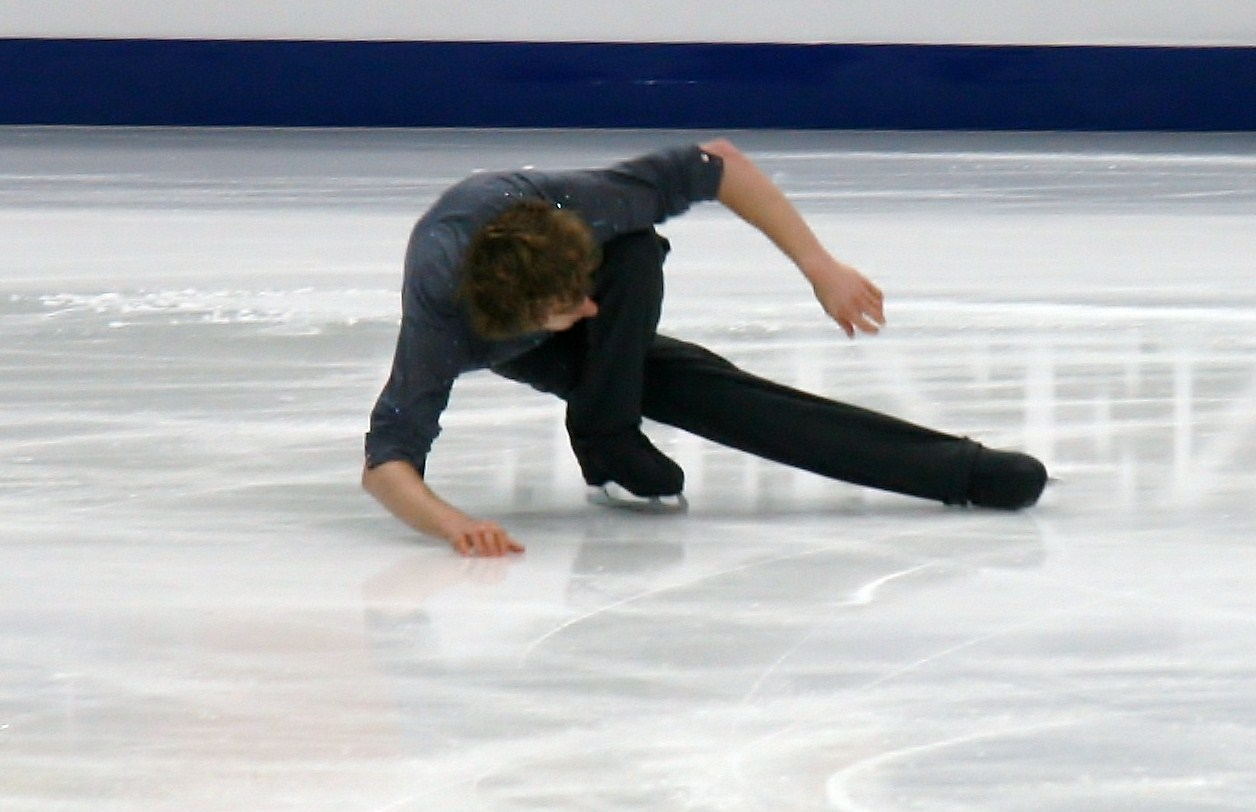
Hydroblading

haircutter
A catch-foot layback spin where the free leg is brought up to head level, but not above. In some cases, the head is dropped back and it appears that the skate blade is in a position to cut the hair of the skater performing the spin. This position is often performed as a segue between a layback spin and a Biellmann spin.
hollow
The groove in the middle of a blade between the inside and outside edges
hop
A small jump that does not include a rotation
hydroblading
A move in which a skater glides on a deep edge with the body stretched in a very low position, almost horizontal to the ice. Several variations in position are possible.

== I ==
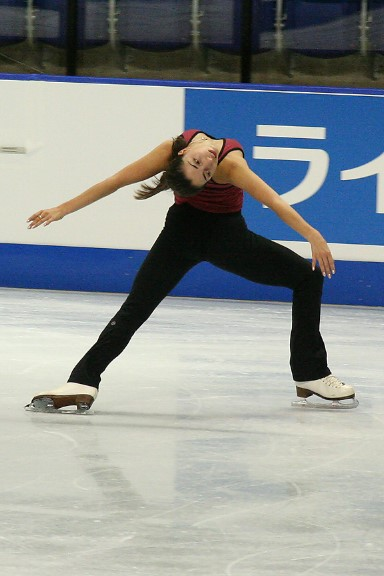
Ina Bauer

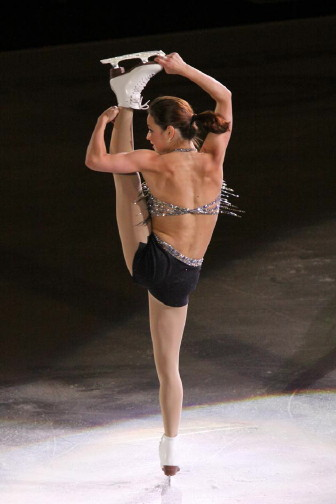
An I-spin position

ice coverage
Use of the ice surface; a skater who covers more ice while gliding or executing an element is said to have greater ice coverage.
ice dance
The skating discipline in which two skaters, typically a male and female, perform a choreographed dance. An ice dance competition consists of two program segments: the rhythm dance (previously the short dance) and the free dance.
IJS
An abbreviation for the ISU Judging System
Ina Bauer
A two-footed move, similar to a spread eagle, in which the skater skates on parallel blades, with one foot on a forward edge and the other on a backward opposite edge (i.e. inside or outside); the knee of the forward leg is slightly bent and the trailing leg is straight.
ineligible
A skater who receives money from sources not approved by the ISU, i.e. a "professional" skater
inside edge
The edge of a skate blade facing towards the body
I-spin
An upright spin position in which the skater pulls the free leg up in a split towards the front of the body, creating an 'I' position
Intermediate level
The competition level below Novice, generally used in club/open competitions for younger competitors
International Skating Union
The international governing body for ice skating sports
ISU
An abbreviation for the International Skating Union
ISU Championship
A championship-level competition held by the ISU. The four figure skating ISU Championships are the World Figure Skating Championships, the World Junior Figure Skating Championships, the Four Continents Figure Skating Championships, and the European Figure Skating Championships. The senior synchronized skating ISU Championships are the World Synchronized Skating Championships and the junior-level equivalent is World Junior Synchronized Skating Championships.
ISU Judging System
A judging system that produces a total score from the technical elements score (TES) and the program components score (PCS). The skater with the highest total score wins.

== J ==
JGP
An abbreviation for the Junior Grand Prix
Jackson Haines spin
The original name for the sit spin
jump
A skating move where a skater pushes off the ice into the air. May be a rotational jump or a positional jump; all jumps that count as elements under the ISU Judging System are rotational jumps, whereas positional jumps count as transitions (the term jump is most often used to mean a rotational jump for this reason).
jump combination
Also combination jump. Two or more jumps performed one directly after the other, without intervening steps or turns. Jump combinations most commonly involve the toe loop or loop as the final jump, because both of these jumps start from the back outside edge, which is the normal landing edge for all six jumps.
jump sequence
Two or more jumps connected by turns or hops
junior age-eligible
A skater who has reached the minimum age, and has not exceeded the maximum age, defined by the ISU for junior-level competition
Junior Grand Prix
A series of eight international events that build to the Junior Grand Prix Final. This is the junior-level complement to the ISU Grand Prix of Figure Skating.
Junior level
The ISU competition level below Senior level. International competitions for Juniors include the ISU Junior Grand Prix and the World Junior Figure Skating Championships.
Junior Olympics
A name for various competitions in different countries. In the United States, the Junior Olympics referred to a competition held to determine the national champions at the Intermediate and Juvenile levels.
Junior Worlds
Also World Juniors. An informal name for the World Junior Figure Skating Championships
Juvenile level
The competition level between Preliminary and Intermediate, generally used in club/open competitions for younger competitors

== K ==
Kilian hold
Also Killian position, side position. A dance hold used in ice dance where the two skaters are side-by-side, facing the same direction, with the man standing to the left and slightly behind the lady. The lady's left arm is held straight across the man's body to hold his left hand; the man places his right arm behind the lady's back with his right hand resting at her waist over the right hip, and the lady places her right hand on the man's right hand, forming a triangular shape with her arm. Switching the position of the dancers results in a reverse Kilian/Killian.
kiss and cry
The area next to the rink at major competitions where the skaters wait to get their results

== L ==
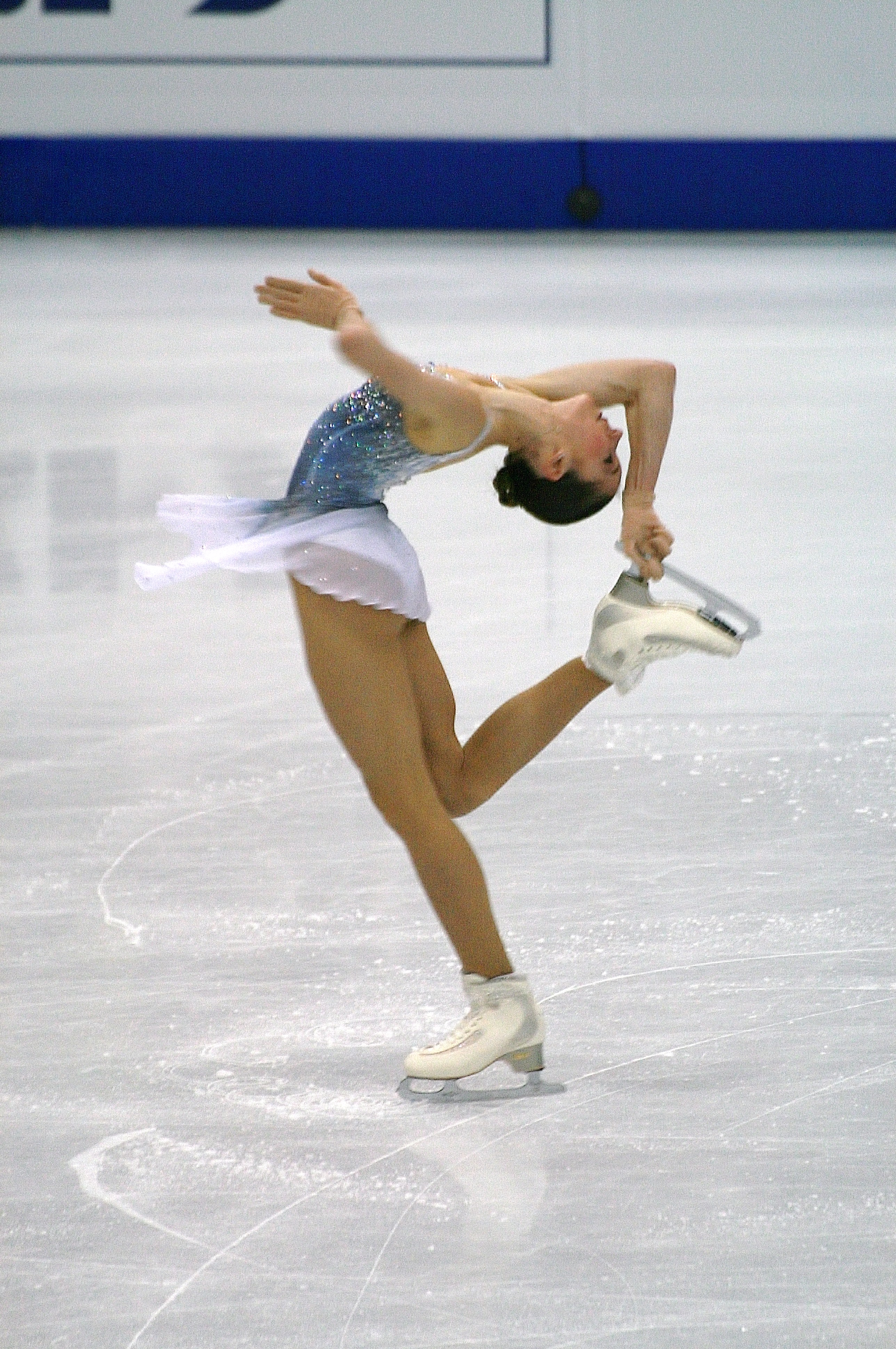
Layback spin with catchfoot

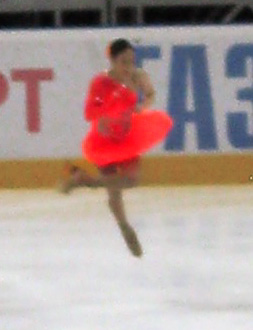
A leg wrap position in midair

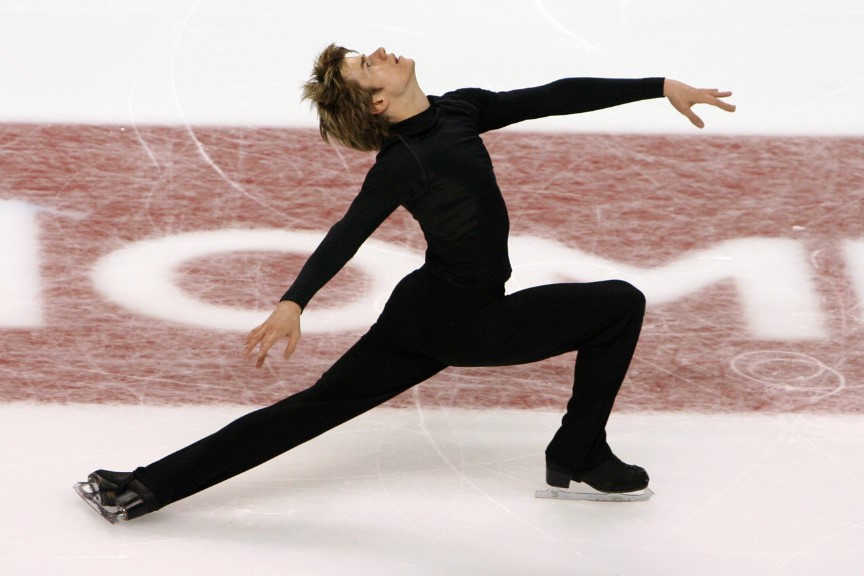
A lunge

LP
The scoring abbreviation for the long program
ladies
The official term for female competitors
landing leg
The leg on which a skater lands a rotational jump – opposite of free leg. For right-handed skaters, it is usually the right leg, and vice versa.
lasso lift
A type of hand-to-hand pair lift
layback spin
An upright spin position in which the back is arched and the head is dropped back, with the free leg bent behind, and the arms often stretched to the ceiling or arched overhead
leg wrap
An air position in rotational jumps where the free leg is held at a right angle to the landing leg, crossing it above the knee, so that it appears to be "wrapped" around the other. Most skaters keep their legs more vertical and crossed at the ankles when they jump.
level (judging)
The assigned difficulty of an element under the ISU Judging System. The highest difficulty level is Level 4.
level (skating)
The division by competitive level of skill. International ISU competitions take place at the Novice, Junior, Senior, and Adult levels.
lift
An element in pair skating and ice dance, in which one skater lifts his/her partner while rotating. Pair lifts, unlike dance lifts, go over the head. Some dancers perform gender bending or "reverse" lifts, in which the woman lifts the man.
lip
A portmanteau of "Lutz" and "flip", for an improperly executed flip jump, where the inside take-off edge is mistakenly changed to an outside edge, making it a Lutz jump.
Lo
The scoring abbreviation for the loop jump
lobe
A semicircle created on the ice by a skate blade
long lift
A group of dance lifts that may last up to ten seconds in competition at the Senior level
long program
An unofficial, but widely used, name for the second and longer of the two programs performed by singles and pair skaters at a competition. The time limit is 4.5 minutes for men's singles and pairs, and 4 minutes for ladies' singles at the Senior level.
loop jump
An edge jump that takes off from a back outside edge and lands on the back outside edge of the same foot
lunge
A skating move in which one leg is bent sharply at the knee, and the other is extended backwards in a straight line with the boot or blade touching the ice
Lutz jump
A toe jump that takes off from a back outside edge and lands on the back outside edge of the opposite foot. You can see it performed in this video by USA Olympian, Jason Brown.
Lz
The scoring abbreviation for the Lutz jump

== M ==
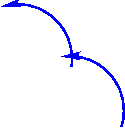
A mohawk turn

mirror skating
Two or more skaters performing in such a way that they are mirroring each other – the opposite of unison skating
mohawk turn
A two-footed turn on the same edge, which continues along the same lobe
moves in the field
Chiefly used in the US; also field moves (UK), skating skills (Canada). Elements of figure skating that emphasize basic skating skills such as edge control and turns, for the purposes of assessing a skater's technical ability on the ice and helping to determine the skater's competitive level.
mule kick
A takeoff of a toe jump (usually Lutz or flip) where the toe-picking leg is lifted or bent excessively high

== N ==
Nationals
A country's national championships, the highest-level competition on the national level, used to decide the national champion. See List of national championships in figure skating.
Novice level
The ISU competition level below Junior level. Novice-level skaters compete in some international events, but there are no Championship-level events for Novice-level skaters. For national competitions, Novice-level skaters may be further subdivided into Basic Novice, Intermediate Novice, and Advanced Novice sections.

== O ==
OD
The scoring abbreviation for the original dance in an ice dance competition
open stroke
An ice dance step that is started close to the skating foot that does not cross in front or behind
ordinal
Under the 6.0 system, the skater's ranking within the group of skaters by a specific judge. Ordinals were more important than the specific marks.
original dance
Formerly, the second segment of an ice dance competition. In 2010, the ISU eliminated the compulsory and original dances, merging them into the short dance.
outside edge
The edge of a skate blade facing away from the body
over-rotated
A jump in which the skater rotates past the position for landing the jump in the air, or fails to check the rotation on landing.

== P ==
PB
An abbreviation for "personal best"
PCS
Abbreviation for program components score
pair lift
Type of lift where the lifter's arms are raised above his shoulders
pair spin
Type of spin in which two skaters rotate around a single axis while holding onto each other
pair skating
Also pairs. The skating discipline in which a partnership, typically composed of a male and female skater, performs overhead lifts, twist lifts, throw jumps, side-by-side spins and jumps. A pairs competition consists of two program segments: the short program and the free skate.
pancake spin
A sit spin that has the free leg tucked over the other, with the upper body bent over the leg
pattern dance
Since 2010, the official name of the compulsory portion of the short dance (now the rhythm dance)
pearl spin
A layback spin in which the free foot is pulled over the head as in a Biellmann spin, however the body stays laid back. This spin was frequently performed by Caroline Zhang of the United States.

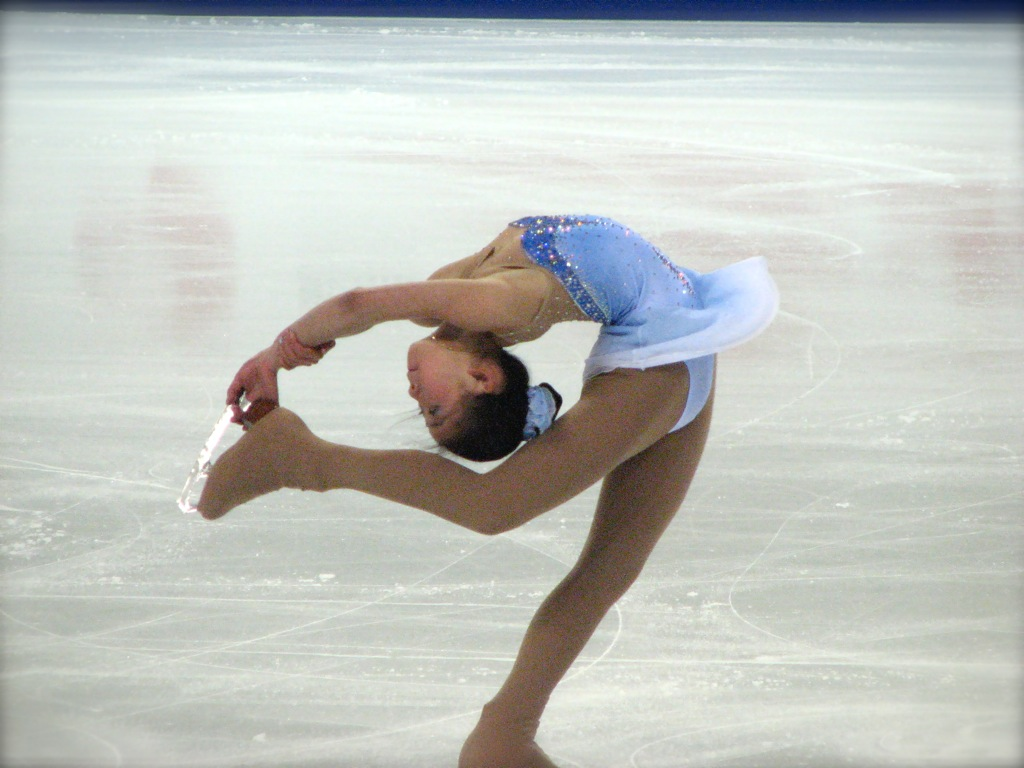
Pearl spin (Caroline Zhang)

personal best
The highest score a skater has earned in ISU competition. Scores from national championships do not count as personal bests.
pivot
A two-footed movement in which one foot is flexed and the toe picks are inserted into the ice as a pivot point, while the other foot travels around the pivot point, such as the movement of a drafting compass.

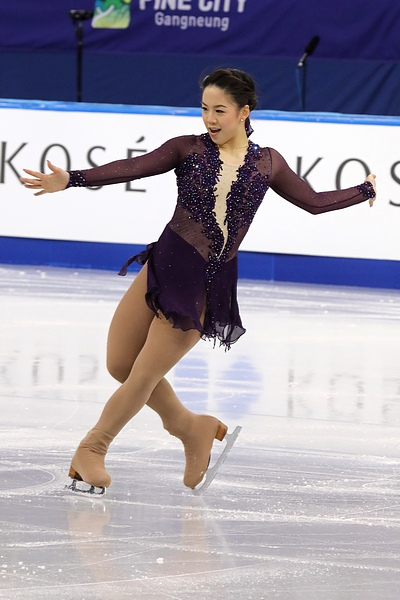
Pivot (Chloe Ing)

pop
As in popping a jump, also a popped jump. During a jump, when a skater prematurely abandons their tight rotational position ("opens up") in mid-air, resulting in fewer than the desired rotations.
positional jump
A jump for the purpose of displaying a position in the air, such as a stag leap and a split jump
Preliminary level
The competition level below Juvenile, generally used in club/open competitions for younger competitors
presentation
The second set of scores in the old 6.0 judging system, also known as "Artistic Impression"
press lift
A type of hand-to-hand pair lift
professional
Skaters who are ineligible to compete in ISU events
program
Skating elements set to music performed by a skater in a defined length of time. All senior-level disciplines currently skate two programs in most ISU events. Before the 2010/11 season, ice dancers performed three or four programs.
program components score
A part of the ISU Judging System; equivalent to the "presentation" mark in the old 6.0 system

== Q ==
quad
See quadruple jump
quadruple jump
A jump with four full rotations (1440 degrees) in the air. In a quadruple Axel, the skater would need to complete 4.5 revolutions (1620 degrees).
qualifying round
A round of competition prior to the short program or compulsory dance to determine which skaters qualify to compete in the main competition

== R ==
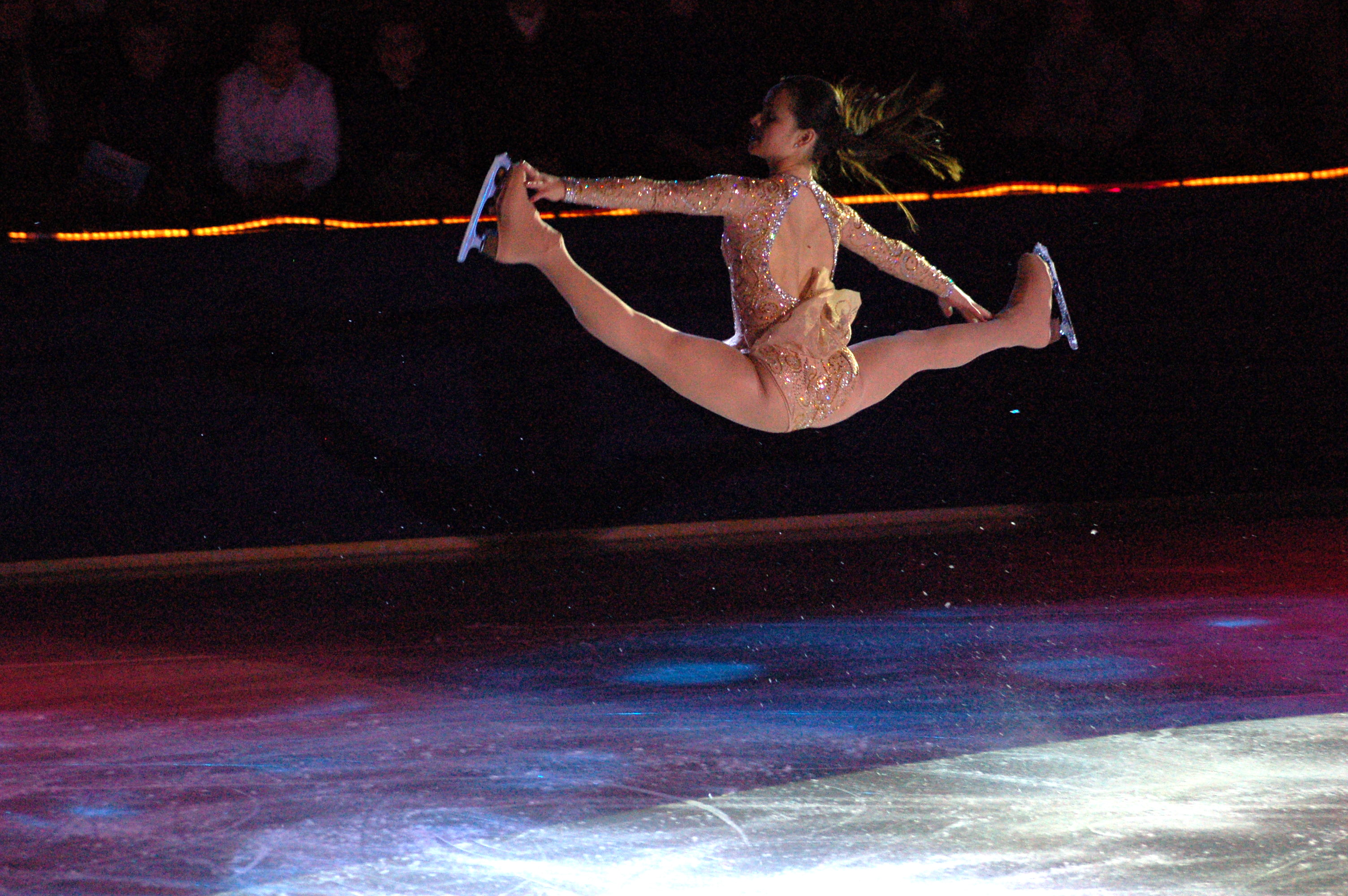
A Russian split jump

RD
The scoring abbreviation for the rhythm dance in an ice dance competition
reverse rotational lift
A pair or dance lift in which the lifter rotates in one direction, then switches and rotates in the other direction, while traveling across the ice
rhythm dance
The first segment of an ice dance competition (known as the short dance prior to June 2018); each team performs a required pattern from one of the compulsory pattern dances (e.g. foxtrot, quickstep) for about half the dance, followed by original choreography with some required elements, to a rhythm and/or theme designated by the ISU annually for the current season.
Rippon jump
Any rotational jump performed with both hands clasped above the head instead of folded at the chest. This jump variation was named after Adam Rippon of the USA.
Rittberger
Another name for the loop jump, named after Werner Rittberger who invented the jump

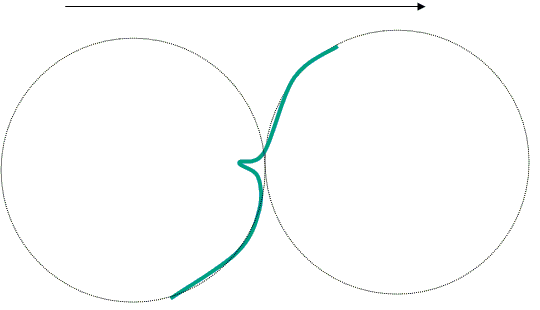
A rocker turn

rocker turn
A one-foot turn with entry and exit on the same edge but which results in a change of lobe with the rotation inside the original lobe. Compare with counter turn.
roll
In ice dance, a forward or backward edge that is either short or long – can be a swing roll or a cross roll
rotational lift
A pair or dance lift in which the lifter rotates in one direction while traveling across the ice
rotational jump
A jump in which the skater rotates in the air and typically lands on one foot going backwards. There are seven rotational jumps; Axel, Salchow, loop, toe loop, flip, Lutz, and waltz.
Russian split
A type of split jump in which the skater performs a straddle position, with the legs and the body forming a 'V' shape, in many cases also touching their toes

== S ==
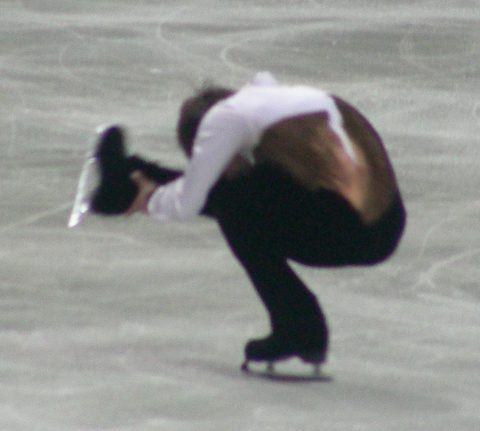
A basic sit spin in a shoot-the-duck position

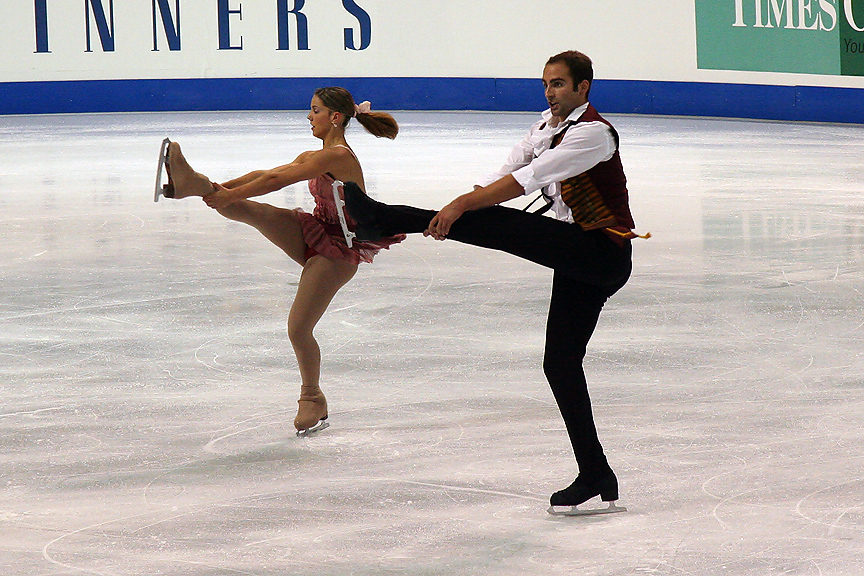
Side-by-side shotgun spins

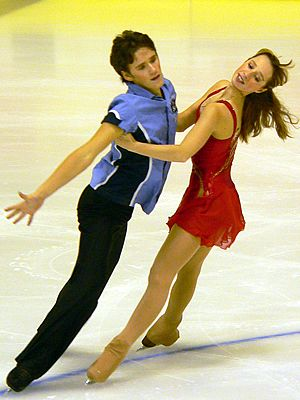
Parallel spread eagles with the male on an inside edge and the female on an outside edge.

S
The scoring abbreviation for the Salchow jump
SB
An abbreviation for "season's best"
SD
The scoring abbreviation for the short dance in an ice dance competition
SSp
The scoring abbreviation for the sit spin
Salchow jump
An edge jump that takes off from a back inside edge and lands on the back outside edge of the opposite foot. Named after Ulrich Salchow. You can see it performed in this video by USA Olympian, Jason Brown.
sanction
Permission to hold a competition or show, granted by the ISU or national governing body. Eligible skaters may only compete in sanctioned events.
SBS
An abbreviation for "side-by-side"
school figures
See compulsory figures
scratch spin
An upright spin in which the skater has the free leg crossed over the ankle of the spinning leg
season's best
A skater's or team's highest score in ISU competition in a particular season
segment
A component part of a figure skating competition in which a specific program is performed by each competitor/team
senior age-eligible
A skater who has reached the minimum age defined by the ISU for senior-level competition
Senior B
A senior-level international competition held with an ISU sanction that is not a Grand Prix or ISU Championship event.
Senior level
Olympic-level competition
serpentine lift
A type of dance lift in which the lifter moves in a serpentine pattern across the ice
sheep jump

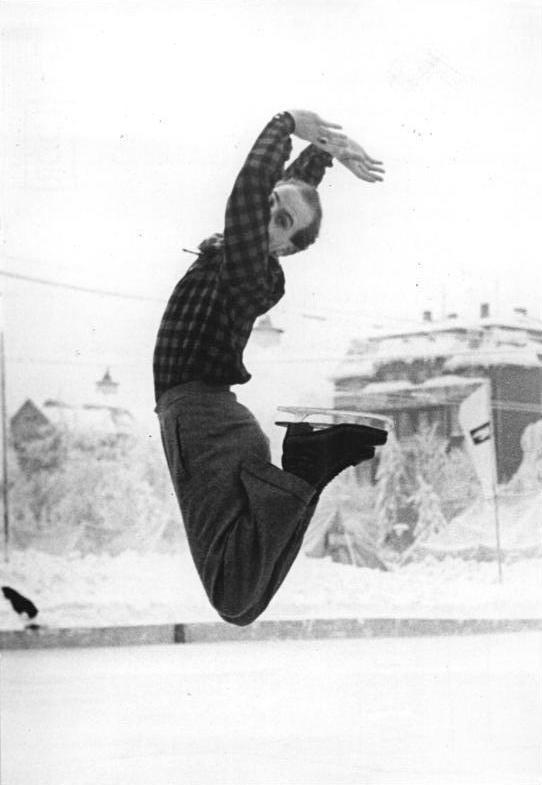
Sheep jump (Kurt Weilert)

A positional jump in which the skater jumps upwards and bends both legs backwards, reminiscent of a sheep, often with the back arched
shoot-the-duck
A skating position in which the skater glides forward on one foot with the skating leg in a bent position and the free leg held forward, parallel to the ice. This is the basic position for a sit spin.
short dance
A program in an ice dance competition combining features of the discontinued compulsory and original dances. Note: The name of the short dance program was changed to "rhythm dance" in June 2018.
short lift
A series of dance lifts that may last up to six seconds in competition at the Senior level
short program
The first and shorter of the two programs performed by singles and pair skaters at a competition. This program has certain required elements that must be completed.
shotgun spin
An upright spin position in which the skater holds the free leg upwards towards the front of the body (but not in a full split position as in the I-spin). The leg is held by the ankle or the calf, not the blade.
side-by-side
Pair skating elements, such as spins and jumps, that are performed with the skaters next to each other, as opposed to pair spins or throw jumps, which are performed as a team.
signature move
A move that a skater is known for and frequently performs, sometimes in a unique or unusual way
similar pair
A pair team made up of two men or two women
simple chasse
In ice dance, a series of two edges across two steps (such as inside and outside). On the second step, the free foot is placed on the ice beside the skating foot and is then lifted parallel to the ice.
single (jump)
A jump with one full rotation (360 degrees) in the air (one and a half rotations for a single Axel)
single skating
Also singles. The skating discipline where one skater performs alone on the ice. A singles competition consists of two program segments: the short program and the free skate.
sit spin
A spin position with the spinning leg bent at the knee and the free leg extended forward
skating foot
Also skating leg. The foot that is on the ice (or the leg that is supporting the body). Compare with free leg and landing leg.
skating skills
See moves in the field
skid spiral
A spiral variation in which the skater holds a position (usually a Y- or I-spiral) and turns from forwards to backwards, or vice versa, using a skidded three turn. This move was invented by Robin Cousins and was notably performed by Sasha Cohen and Evgenia Medvedeva.
slide chasse
In ice dance, a series of two edges across two steps (such as inside and outside). On the second step, the free foot is placed on the ice beside the skating foot and then slides off the ice in the direction the skater is skating.
spin
A rotation upon the ice surface, performed on the round part of the blade just behind the toe pick. The three basic spins are the upright spin, the sit spin, and the camel spin.
spin combination
Also combination spin. A sequence of two or more spin positions performed in quick succession, often including a change of foot and sometimes also a change of direction (clockwise/counter-clockwise)
spiral
An edge skated with the free leg extended at, or above, hip level. A required element for ladies' and pairs competitions. A good spiral depends on edge control and speed across the ice, not necessarily leg position.
split
A position in which the legs are parallel to each other and extended in opposite directions on either the horizontal or vertical axis. See Split (gymnastics).
split jump
A jump in the air in which a split is achieved, rather than any specific rotation. See: Split jumps.
split twist
A twist lift in which, prior to rotating, the lady performs a split with each leg separated by at least a 45 degree angle from the body axis
SP
The scoring abbreviation for the short program in a singles or pairs competition
spread eagle
An element performed with both feet on the ice, the blades turned out with the heels pointing towards each other; can be performed on inside edges (an "inside spread eagle") or outside edges (an "outside spread eagle")
Sotnikova spin
A catch-foot camel spin in which the body is twisted and the free leg is pulled up over the side of the body rather than over the back. This variation is colloquially named for Adelina Sotnikova.
stag leap
A split jump in which the front leg is bent under the body
stationary lift
A pair or dance lift performed "on the spot", without ice coverage
step
In ice dance, a one-foot tracing on the ice
step-out
When a skater either under- or over-rotates a jump so that he/she does not land cleanly and must put the free leg down prematurely
step sequence
A series of footwork and field moves performed during a program. May be circular, straight line, or serpentine in pattern.
straight-line lift
A dance lift in which the lifter moves in a straight line across the ice; may be performed on one foot or two
stroking
A way of moving across the ice and gaining speed by using the edges of the blades
Soldatova rule
Colloquial name of the rule stating that a skater must wait out a certain amount of time from international competition when changing the country they represent. The informal name refers to Julia Soldatova.
swizzle
Also fishes, lemons, scissors, sculling. A way of moving across the ice on two feet by pushing the feet outwards from a 90 degree angle and then pulling them together again, forming an oval on the ice
synchronized skating
An ice skating discipline in which groups of figure skaters perform together as one unit

== T ==
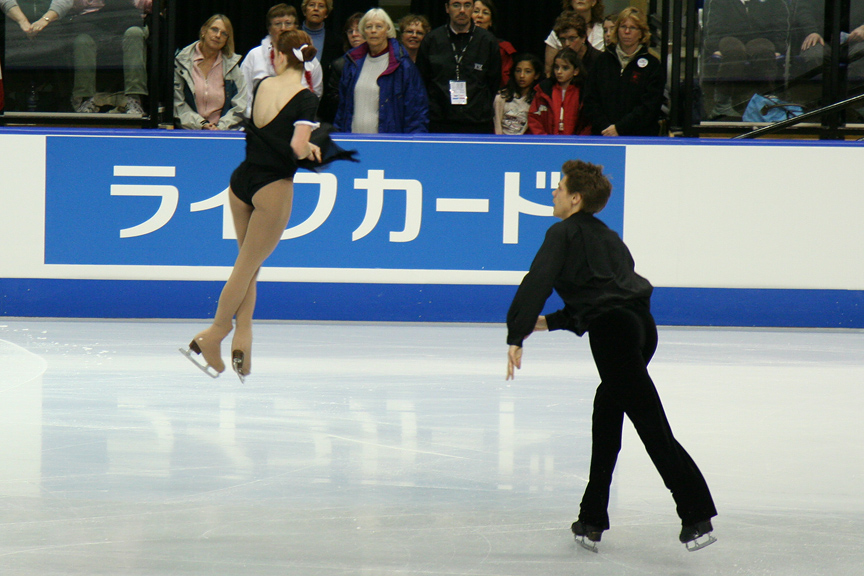
A throw jump in mid-air

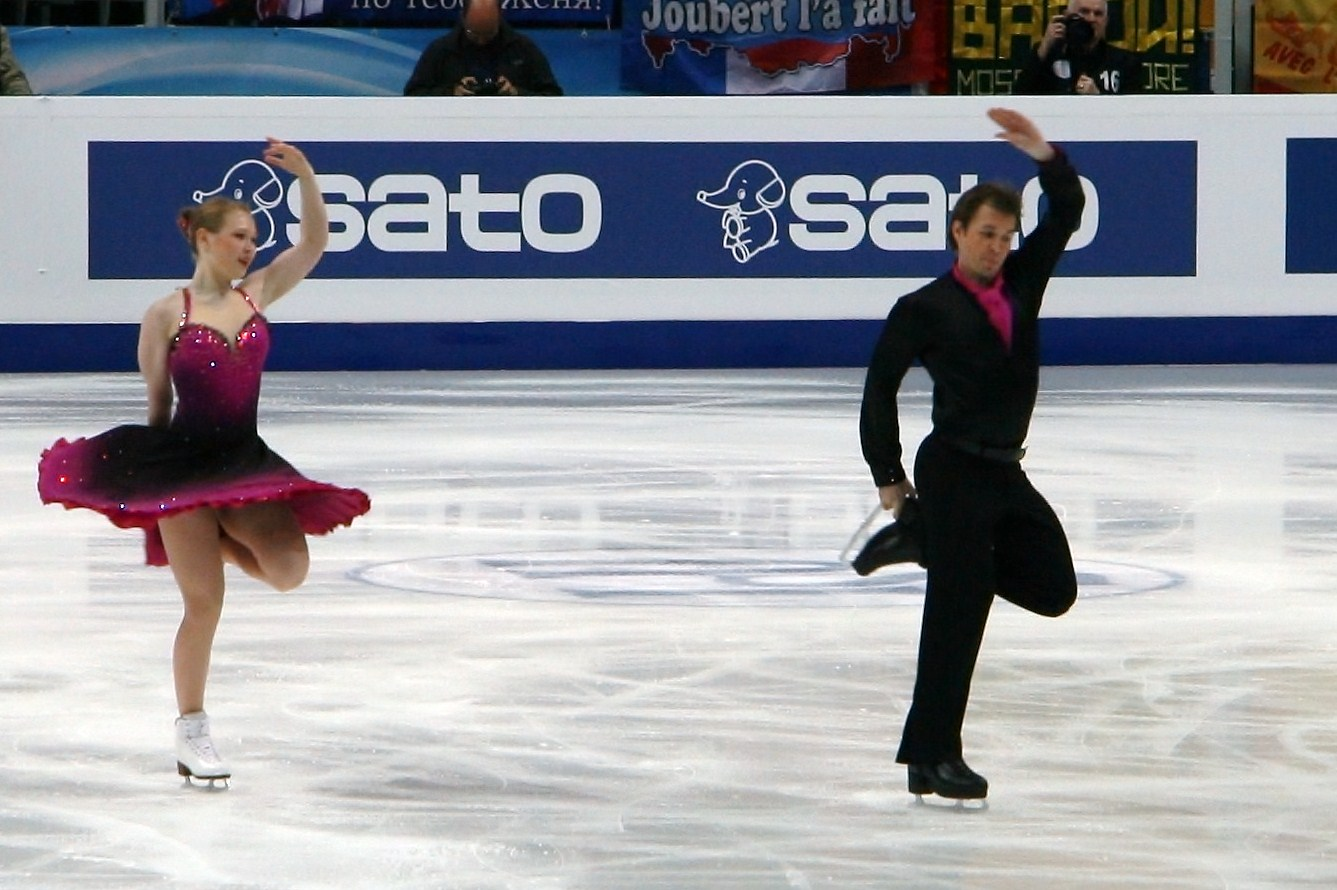
Twizzles

T
The scoring abbreviation for the toe loop jump
TES
Abbreviation for technical elements score
tano jump
An arm position variation during a rotational jump, where one arm is extended overhead instead of folded at the chest, thus increasing the difficulty of the jump. Made famous by Brian Boitano, hence tano.
technical elements score
A part of the ISU Judging System; based on performance of elements
three jump
See waltz jump
three turn
See 3 turn
throw jump
An element in pair skating in which one skater throws the other into the air, where she completes a normal jump. Throw jumps usually have increased height and power because of the extra help involved.
toe loop jump
A toe jump that takes off from a back outside edge and lands on the back outside edge of the same foot. You can see it performed in this video by USA Olympian, Jason Brown.
toe jump
Also toe-assisted jump. A general term to refer to any rotational jump that uses a toe pick assist; the three toe jumps that count as jump elements are the toe loop, the flip, and the Lutz
toe pick
The set of teeth at the front of a skate blade that assists a skater in jumps and spins. See also Figure skate blades.
toe step
An ice dance step in which the skater walks from one toe pick to the other
toe Walley
A single or double rotation toe-assisted jump taken off from a backward inside edge. Named after American skater Nate Walley.
transition
A movement that connects one skating element to the next
traveling
A spin that moves across the ice instead of staying centered in one spot on the ice
triple jump
A jump with three full rotations (1080 degrees) in the air; the triple Axel requires the skater to complete 3.5 revolutions (1260 degrees).
two-footed landing
The landing of a rotational jump where both feet touch the ice (a correct landing is on one foot).
twizzle
A quick multi-rotational turn on one foot while moving forwards or backwards

== U ==
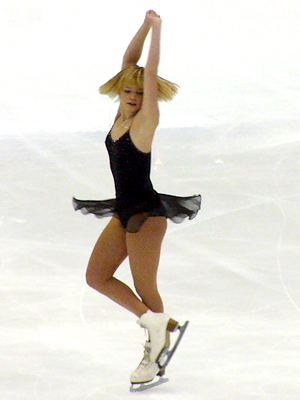
Upright spin

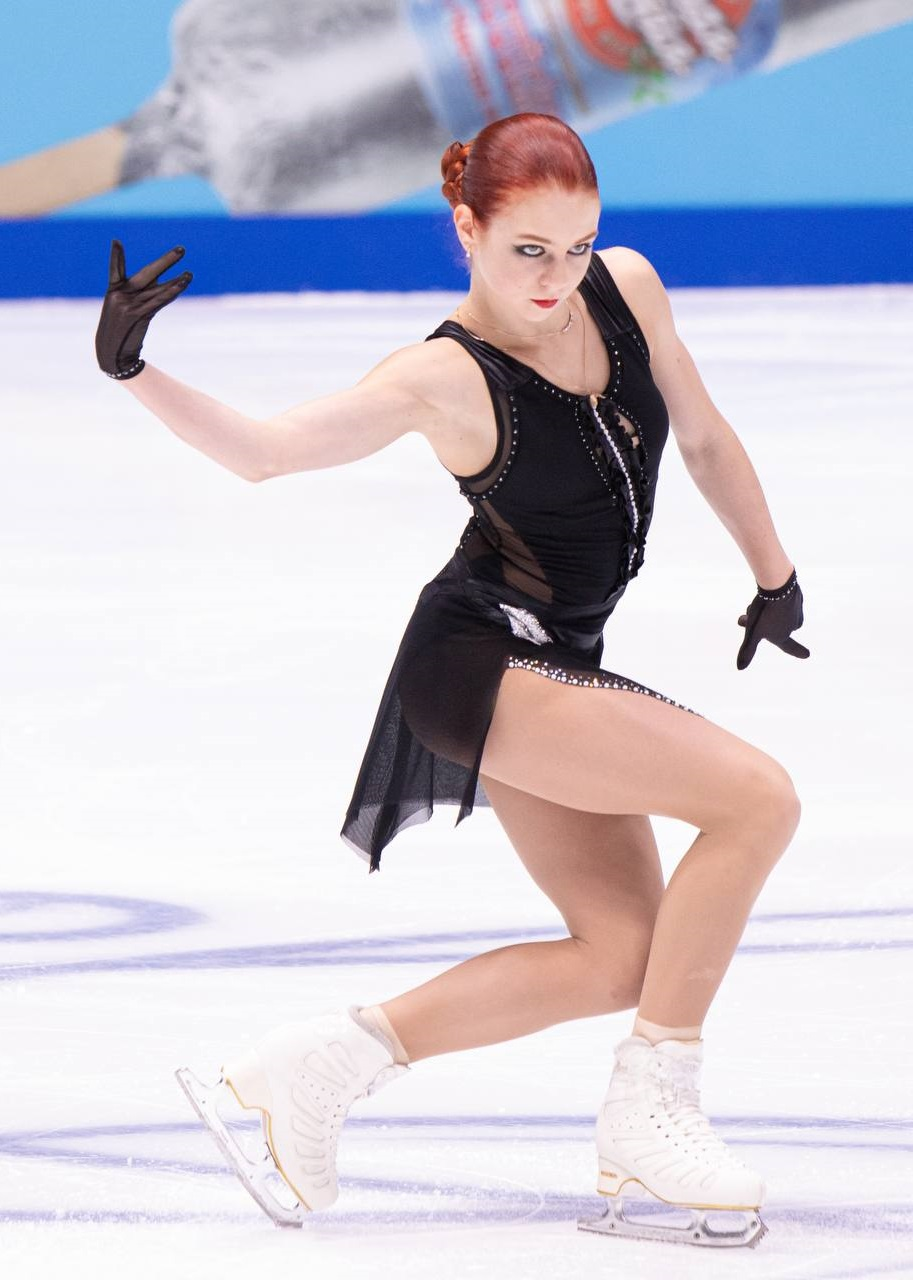
Alexandra Trusova is known for her ability to do many Ultra C jumps

USp
The scoring abbreviation for the upright spin
under-rotated
A jump or throw jump that is missing more than a quarter, but less than one-half, of a revolution
unison skating
Two or more skaters performing the same steps or elements at the same time – the opposite of mirror skating
upright spin
One of the three basic spin positions
Ultra C
Jumps with over 3.5 rotations.

== W ==
WS
Abbreviation for World Standings
Walley jump
A single or double rotation jump taken off from a backward inside edge, rotates against the edge, (aka "reverse jump"), and lands on the same foot backward outside edge. Named after American skater Nate Walley.
waltz jump
Also three jump. A 180-degree rotation, one of the first jumps skaters learn
warm-up group
See flight
World Figure Skating Championships
An ISU Championship at the World-level in which skaters compete for the title of World Champion
World Junior Figure Skating Championships
An ISU Championship at the World-level in which skaters who are junior age-eligible compete for the title of World Junior Champion
World Juniors
Also Junior Worlds. Informal name for the World Junior Figure Skating Championships
Worlds
Informal name for the World Figure Skating Championships
World Standings
A ranking based on certain international results over the current and preceding two seasons

== Y ==
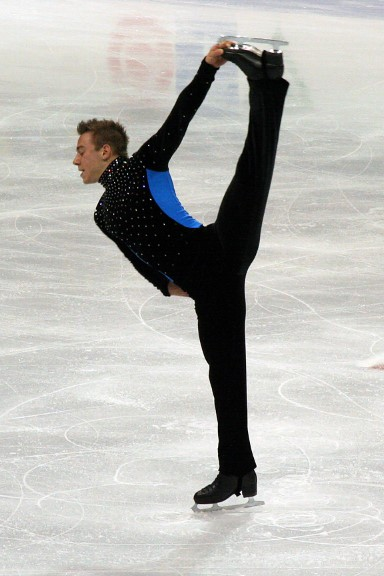
A Y-spin position

Y-spin
An upright spin position in which the free leg is pulled up into a vertical split towards the side of the body, creating a 'Y' shape
Y-spiral
A spiral position in which the free leg is held up in a vertical split towards the side of the body, creating a 'Y' shape
Yuna spin
A camel spin variation in which the body is twisted so it is facing upwards and the free leg is bent. Named after 2010 Olympic champion Yuna Kim who frequently performed the move.

== Z ==
Zayak rule
A colloquial name for the rule that limits the number of times a skater can perform multi-revolution jumps in a program. In its original form, the rule limited female single skaters to a maximum of four triple jumps in their free program at the Senior level. However, it now applies to both double and triple jumps at any level. The latest amendment, adopted by the ISU in June 2018, states that "of all triple and quadruple jumps only two can be executed twice" and "of the two repetitions only one can be a quadruple jump". The unofficial name of the rule refers to Elaine Zayak, who gained an athletic advantage by performing multiple double Axels and triple loops in place of other less valuable technical elements. The rule was enacted after the 1982 world championships in which Zayak had performed the same jump four times, specifically a triple toe loop.
Zagitova rule
A colloquial term for the rule that limits skaters to receiving a 10% bonus for jumps to a maximum of one jump element in the second half of the short program and a maximum of three jump elements in the second half of the free skating program. The rule was adopted by the ISU in 2018 after Olympic champion Alina Zagitova performed all of her jumps in the second half of her free program at the 2018 Winter Olympics to receive maximum bonus points, contributing to her win.
