= Choctaw Corner, Alabama =

- Ghost town
- Location within the state of Alabama
- Coordinates: 31.93487°N 87.75472°W
- Country: United States
- State: Alabama
- County: Clarke
- Elevation: 377 ft (115 m)
- Time zone: UTC-6 (Central (CST))
  - Summer (DST): UTC-5 (CDT)

Choctaw Corner was a former town in Clarke County, Alabama, United States. It is named for the nearby Choctaw Corner, which marked the border between the native Choctaw and Creek peoples prior to the Indian removal. The community was one of the earliest settlements in the county.

Choctaw Corner had a post office by 1850. It was a prosperous community during the antebellum period and for many years afterwards. Then, when the railroad from Mobile to Selma came through Clarke County in 1888, less than 2 miles (3.2 km) southeast of Choctaw Corner, the town began to die.

A new town, Thomasville, developed on the railroad. The people in the older community saw the potential of the new town as a railroad shipping point and were among the first people to move there. The former town of Choctaw Corner slowly declined into nonexistence and was later enveloped within Thomasville's city limits. It is now remembered primarily by Thomasville's city cemetery on its western border, called Choctaw Corner Cemetery.

Historical population
Census	Pop.	Note	%±
1850	250		—
1880	150		—
U.S. Decennial Census

== Geography ==
Choctaw Corner was located at 31.93487°N 87.75472°W at an elevation of 377 feet (115 m).
