= Choctaw Corner =

Coordinates: 31.99046°N 87.81986°W

Map of modern Alabama showing location of Choctaw Corner

The Choctaw Corner is a former Native American boundary location near the modern border between Clarke and Marengo counties in Alabama, United States. It was established as the northernmost terminus for a mutually agreed upon boundary line between the Choctaw and Creek peoples during the Mississippi Territory period. This boundary line, now known as the “Old Indian Treaty Boundary,” starts at the Alabama River cut-off in southernmost Clarke County and follows a northward path through the county along the drainage divide between the Tombigbee and Alabama rivers to the Choctaw Corner, then turns ninety degrees to the west and follows the modern county-line between Clarke and Marengo to the Tombigbee River.

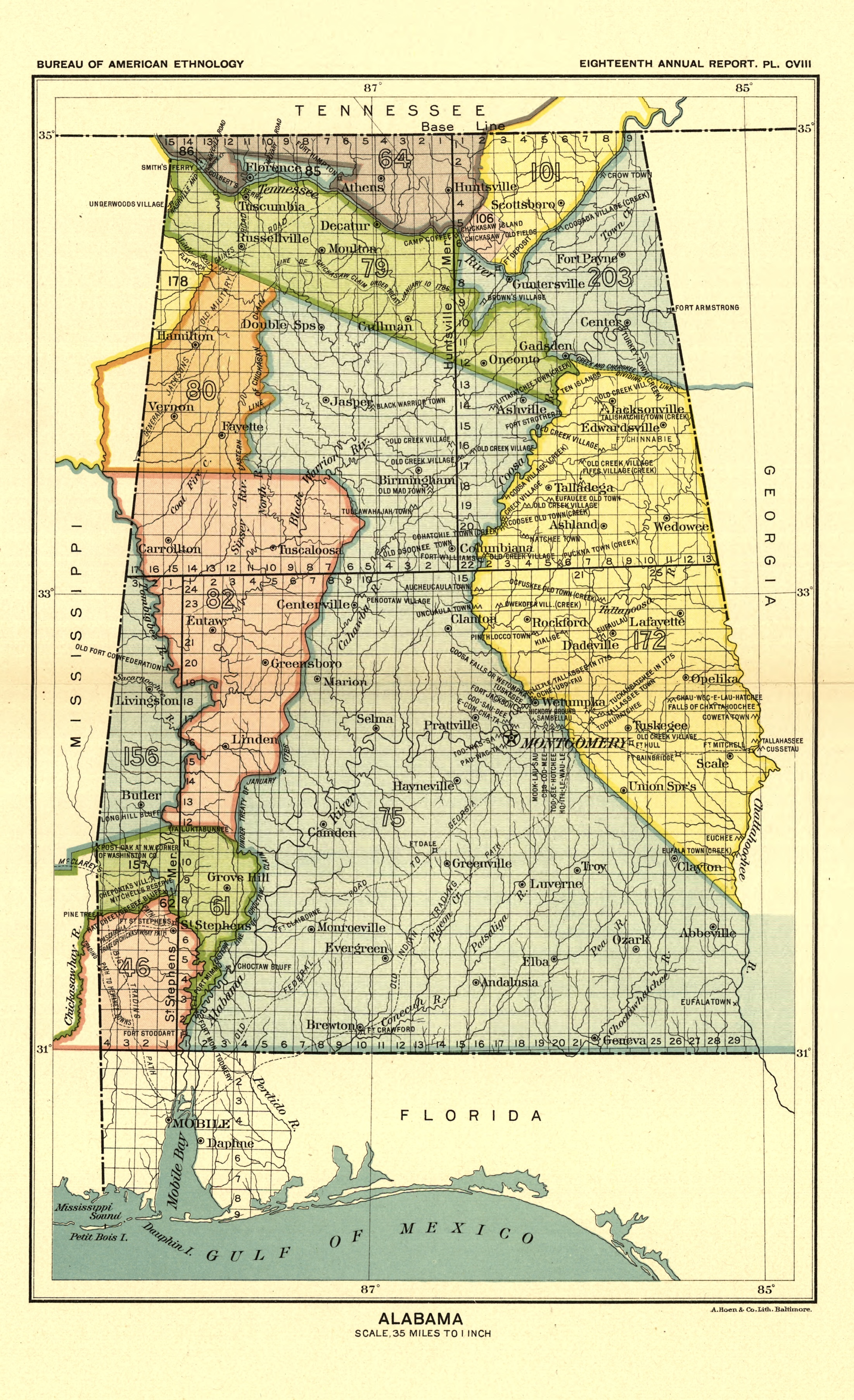
Alabama map from Royce's Indian Land Cessions

== History ==
Beginning a decade prior to the eruption of the Creek War, the Choctaw Corner had its roots in white settlement of territory that the Creek saw as encroachment upon their western lands. They had already experienced white encroachment on their eastern lands in Georgia. The Choctaw claimed the lands in modern Clarke County from the Tombigbee River eastward to the watershed as theirs. Although the Creek had traditionally claimed the lands from the Alabama River westward to the watershed, as early as 1802 the Alibamu people, as the closest members of the Creek Confederacy to the new settlers, claimed that their territory reached all the way across to the Tombigbee.

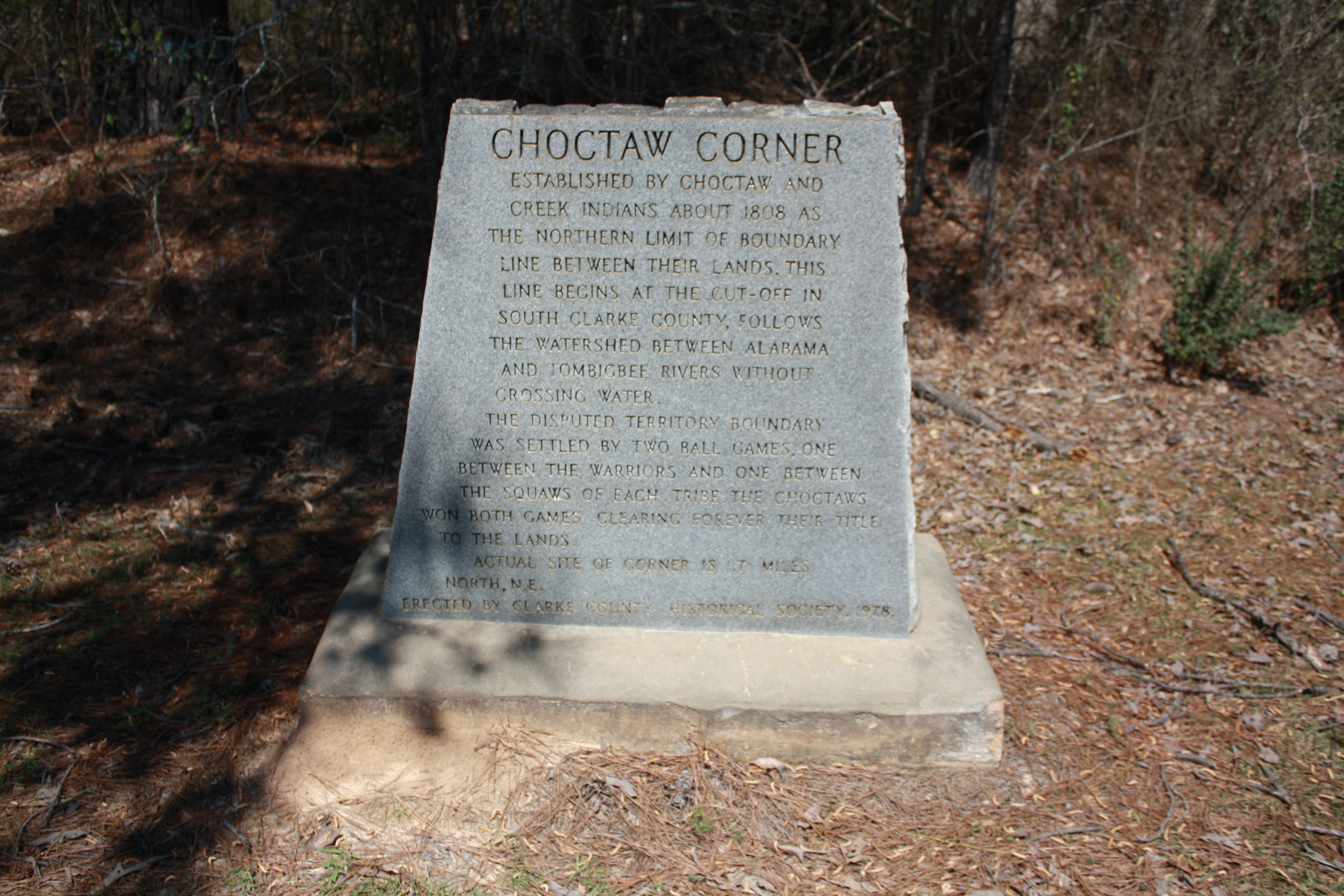
Historical marker detailing the history of the Choctaw Corner.

After much persuasion, veiled threats, and a payment of $50,000 plus an annuity in goods of $3000, the Choctaw signed the Treaty of Mount Dexter with the United States on November 16, 1805 that ceded 4,142,720 acres (16,765.0 km2) of their territory, including the disputed land east of the Tombigbee, to the Americans.

In about 1808 the two Native American peoples decided to settle their argument over control of the strip of land between the two rivers by a traditional ball game. The Choctaw won but the Creek were dissatisfied with the results. The two groups decided to let the women play, and the Choctaw women won as well, which settled the dispute.

Possibly disappointed that the treaty did not include the fertile lands on the east bank of the Mississippi River, President Thomas Jefferson had delayed ratification in the Senate for over two years after the signing. The boundary line was finally surveyed in 1809, with both Creek and Choctaw assisting.

Several years after the Indian Removal in the 1830s, European-American settlers founded a new town named Choctaw Corner a few miles southeast of the old boundary marker.

== See also ==
- Fort Sinquefield
