= USS Choctaw (1898) =

Tugboat of the United States Navy

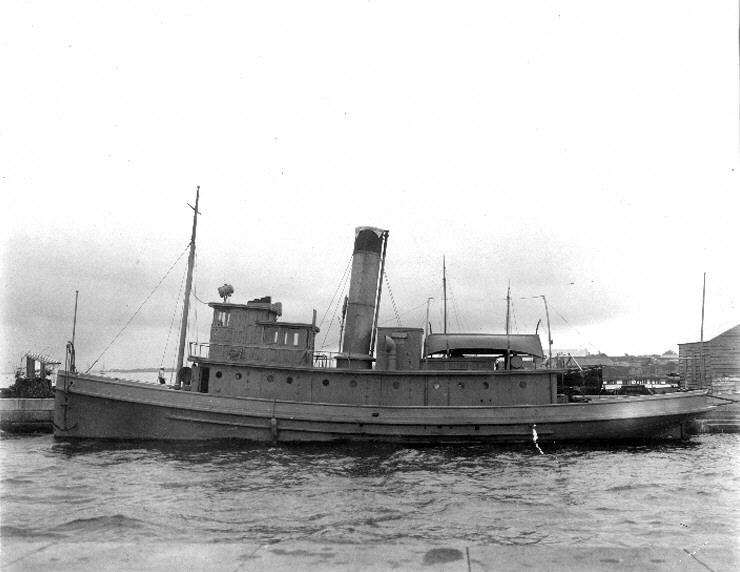

History

United States
- Name: USS Choctaw, later USS Wicomico
- Builder: Neafie & Levy, Philadelphia, Pennsylvania
- Launched: 1892, as C.G. Coyle
- Acquired: by purchase
- Commissioned: 19 April 1898, 15 June 1899
- Decommissioned: 26 August 1898, 15 July 1902
- In service: 1904
- Renamed: USS Wicomico 20 February 1918
- Stricken: 27 February 1940
- Fate: Sank, 15 February 1940, salvaged & scrapped August 1940
- Notes: Named C.G. Coyle prior to U.S. Navy service

General characteristics
- Type: Tugboat
- Displacement: 152 t (150 long tons)
- Length: 91 ft 5 in (27.86 m)
- Beam: 21 ft (6.4 m)
- Draft: 10 ft (3.0 m)
- Propulsion: steam, single screw
- Speed: 10 knots (19 km/h; 12 mph)
- Armament: 1 × 3-pounder gun; 1 × 1-pounder gun

The second USS Choctaw was a yard tug in the United States Navy from the Spanish–American War to World War II. She was renamed USS Wicomico in 1918.

== USS Choctaw ==
A steam tug built at Philadelphia by Neafie & Levy as C.G. Coyle, she was completed in 1892. Acquired by the Navy from W.G. Coyle Co. for service during the Spanish–American War, the tug was renamed Choctaw and commissioned on 19 April 1898.

Attached to the Auxiliary Naval Force for patrol duty during the brief war with Spain, Choctaw operated in the Gulf of Mexico through the cessation of hostilities. That same year, on 26 August, she was decommissioned at the Pensacola Navy Yard. Recommissioned the following year on 15 June, Choctaw sailed for Portsmouth, New Hampshire, with USS Monongahela in tow, before reporting to the naval training station at Newport, Rhode Island for duty as a yard tug and ferry. Subsequently detached and sent to the Norfolk Navy Yard for repairs, the ship was again placed out of commission on 15 July 1902.

Placed back in active service in 1904, Choctaw served at the Washington Navy Yard through World War I. She was renamed Wicomico on 20 February 1918.

== USS Wicomico (YT-26) ==
On Memorial Day (30 May) 1918, Wicomico took part in a memorial ceremony, sponsored by the Daughters of the American Revolution, for all victims of World War I who died at sea, particularly victims of the sinking of RMS Lusitania. A floral wreath was thrown into the Potomac from Wicomico's deck. The former Vanderbilt steam yacht HMS Warrior also took part in the ceremony.

On 17 July 1920 Wicomico was designated YT-26. Transferred to the Norfolk Navy Yard on 21 April 1921, she served in the 5th Naval District through the outbreak of World War II.

On 15 February 1940, Wicomico collided with the destroyer USS Goff in Hampton Roads and sank shortly thereafter. Struck from the Navy list on 27 February 1940, the ship was salvaged and subsequently scrapped.
