= List of figure skating turns =

Figure skating manoeuvres

A figure skating turn is "a rotational movement in which the skater moves from forward to backward or backward to forward using one foot and on an edge and axis". There are eight types of turns in figure skating. With the exception of C turns and S turns, they are "named after the shape or figure drawn on the ice by the skater's blade".

Figure skating turns were first taught to new skaters learning to execute compulsory figures. After its demise in 1990, instead of replacing figures in training skaters, coaches continued to teach turns to instill "the discipline necessary to execute turns" during elements across all disciplines of figure skating (single skating, pair skating, and ice dance). Every figure skating turn is executed on both feet and in both the backward and forward directions. Every move, step, and element incorporates turns to connect steps, enter a spin or jump, and perform footwork. Turns can be executed in both directions.

== Bracket turn ==
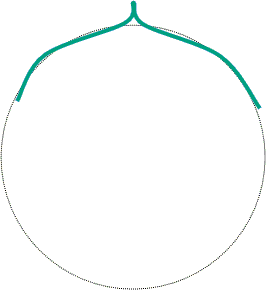
Bracket turn diagram

A bracket turn is a one-foot turn. The bracket turn was developed in Austria and England during the late 18th century. Like three-turns, brackets change edge and direction, but do not change feet in their execution. Also, unlike the three-turn, brackets are executed by turning outside the circle pattern made on the ice, while a three-turn rotates into the circle. The bracket's rotation is "exactly opposite that of a three". It is performed on one leg. Skaters, when making the bracket turn, create a figure that resembles the curly bracket symbol on a keyboard. Bracket turns are more difficult to execute than three-turns, but easier than rocker turns and counter turns. There are five types of bracket turns: the forward inside bracket, the forward outside bracket, the back outside bracket, the back inside bracket, and the advanced back bracket.

== C turn ==
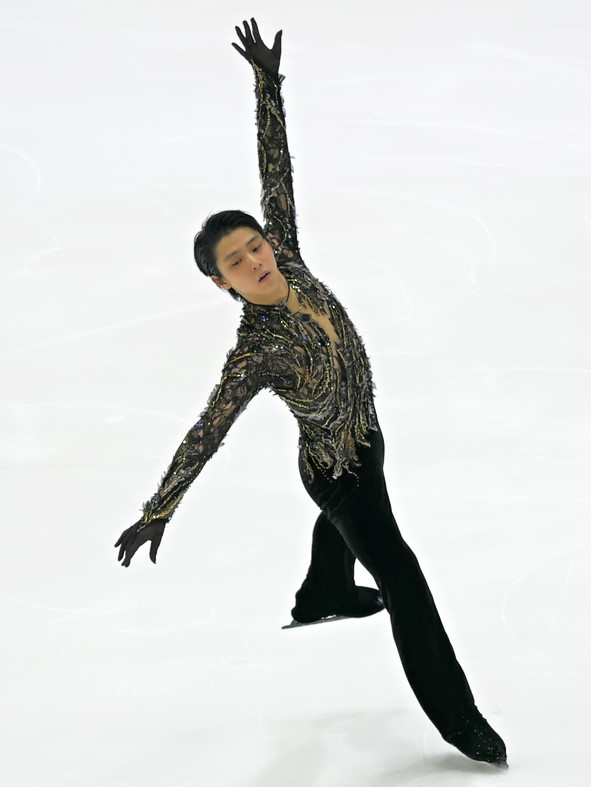
Japanese skater Yuzuru Hanyu executing a C turn (2018)

The C turn (originally called the Mohawk turn) is "a turn from one foot to the other in which the entry and exit curves are continuous and of equal depth". The change of foot is from an inside edge to an inside edge or from an outside edge to an outside edge. It has also been described as " a turn from the forward inside edge of one foot to the back inside of the other, or from forward outside to back inside, remaining on the same curve". The C turn is a way that skaters turn from front to back, or from back to front, while traveling across the ice. It is also a two-footed turn, unlike the tree-turn, which is a one-footed turn. It is, like the three-turn, executed on a curve, but changes from one foot to the other, and changes direction, but not edge. C turns and S turns can be interchanged when used as an entrance into another move. The C turn, along with the three-turn, is one of the easiest turns to learn; beginners learn to use it "without thinking".

A C turn can be executed as either closed or open, which is indicated by the position of the free foot and hip at the exit of the turn, as well as by the placement of the free foot in relation to the skating foot. The heel of the free foot is placed at the instep of the skating foot during the execution of the open C turn, and the hips are open at its exit. The free foot is placed behind the heel of the skating foot during the execution of the closed C turn, and hips are closed at its exit. A C turn that begins on an inside edge involves a change of direction and feet, but not a change in edge.

There are seven types of C turns, which are designated by foot (right or left), direction (forward or backward), and edge (inside or outside). The types are: the inside open C turn, the inside closed C turn, the outside open C turn, the outside closed C turn, the back C turn, the drop C turn, and the swing C turn.

The C turn and the S turn, the only turns executed from one foot to the other, were the only steps that were not named for the shapes they resembled on the ice. The Mohawk turn was probably originally a roller skating term introduced around 1870, and then transferred to the ice at the London Skating Club around 1879. British skaters' choice to name the turn the Mohawk was probably arbitrary, but it was influenced by the British public's fascination with the indigenous peoples of North America during the early 1800s. Ivan Danyliuk of Skate Ukraine, the organization that oversees figure skating in Ukraine, states that British skaters probably visited the Wild West shows that were popular in Britain and "noticed similarities in steps of Mohawk and Choctaw Indians in their war dances to what they were performing on the ice". Others have said that the pattern resembled the bow used by native peoples. Figure skating writer Ellen Kestnbaum, however, states that no one knows why the C turn and the S turn were named the Mohawk and the Choctaw.

In October 2020, Skate Canada, the organization that oversees figure skating in Canada, announced that it had changed the terms Mohawk turn and Choctaw turn to C turn and S turn, which both refer to "the tracing of the ice that is left when these steps are performed". Skate Canada stated that the change was part of their effort to "improve equity, diversity and inclusion" in figure skating. They changed the terminology across all their domestic applications, adding, "This revision works toward the decolonizing of our terminology and aligns with our commitment to anti-racism". Other skating federations supported the change, including Skate Ukraine, which stated that they wholeheartedly supported the change and called the decision "a bold move".

== Counter turn ==
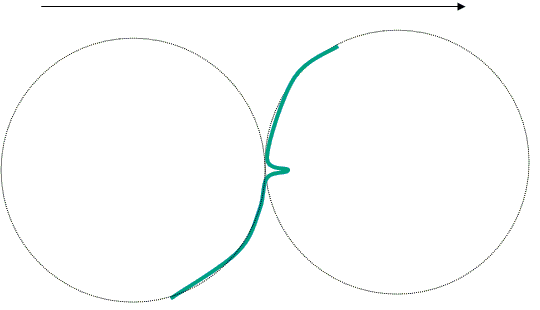
Counter turn diagram

A counter turn is a "turn executed on one foot from an outside edge to an outside edge or an inside edge to an inside edge". The skater exits the turn on a different section of the turn than the entry curve and in the opposite direction to the entry curve. The counter turn is similar to a bracket turn because the skater's blade "turns against the natural rotation of the curve" and does not change edge or feet. It also changes direction and travels from one circle to another. Like the rocker turn, it draws figures that look like a curly bracket symbol, but with one-half of the bracket pointing in the opposite direction. Counter turns are more difficult to execute than three-turns and bracket turns. The counter turn was developed in England during the late 1800s.

There are four types of counter turns: the forward inside counter, the forward outside counter, the back inside counter, and the back outside counter.

== Loop turn ==
A loop turn is a turn that looks like the letter "m," but with an additional loop at its central point. It is executed by traveling forward on one foot while the weight is shifted, which creates a circular shape.

== Rocker turn ==
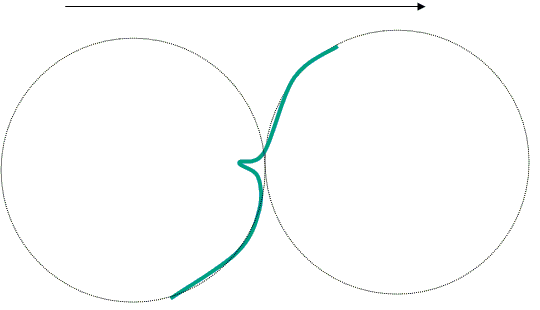
Rocker turn diagram

The rocker turn is a turn executed "on one foot from an outside edge to an outside edge or an inside edge to an inside edge, with the exit curve on a different part of the turn from the entry curve". Like the counter turn, it draws figures that look like a curly bracket symbol, but with one-half of the bracket pointing in the opposite direction. It maintains the same edge throughout the turn. The rocker turn is similar to a three-turn; like a three-turn, it rotates inside the circle. It changes direction, but does not change feet, and travels from one circle to another. It does not change direction, although it is similar to a change of edge in that it has a turn in the center, which faces into the direction of the first circle. Rocker turns were developed during the late 1800s.

There are four types of rocket turns: the forward outside rocker, the forward inside rocker, the back inside rocker, and the back outside rocker.

== S turn ==
The S turn (originally called the Choctaw turn) is a "turn from one foot to the other in which the curve of the exit edge is in the opposite direction to that of the entry edge". The change of foot is from an outside edge to an inside edge, or from an inside edge to an outside edge. The entry and exit edges are of equal depth. The S turn is a variation in turning direction. Like the C turn, the S turn changes feet and direction, but unlike the C turn, it also changes edges. Also like the C turn, the S turn rotates on two feet. The skater simultaneously changes their foot, direction, and edges of their blades. The S turn is "a change in foot, direction, and edge character all at once". It is more difficult than the C turn. There are seven types of S turns: the outside S turn, the inside S turn, the open S turn, the junior S turn, the closed S turn, the swing S turn, and the back S turn.

The S turn and the C turn were the only turns that were not named for the shapes they resembled on the ice. In October 2020, Skate Canada announced that it had changed the terms Choctaw turn and Mohawk turn to S turn and C turn.

== Three-turn ==
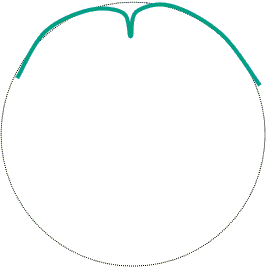
Three-turn diagram

A three-turn is "a turn executed on one foot from an outside edge to an inside edge or an inside edge to an outside edge, with the exit curve continuing on the same lobe as the entry curve". It is executed on one foot on a curve, allowing the skater to change direction by 180 degrees and move from the front to the back or from the back to the front. It gets its name from the pattern made on the ice and resembles the number "3." The three-turn, along with the C turn, is one of the easiest turns to learn; beginners learn to use it "without thinking".

When executing the three-turn, the skater turns in the direction of the curve. The skater does not execute a change in feet; rather, they will change edge and direction. For example, a turn that begins on an inside edge will end on an outside edge, and a turn that begins on an outside edge will end on an inside edge. If the turn begins in a forward direction, it will end in a backward direction, but the same foot is used throughout the turn.

There are six types of three-turns: the forward outside three-turn, the forward inside three-turn, the back outside three-turn, the back inside three-turn, the double three-turn, and the drop three-turn. The double three-turn is "a combination of forward and backward (or backward and forward)" three-turns. A drop three-turn "is basically a three with an added step".

== Twizzle ==
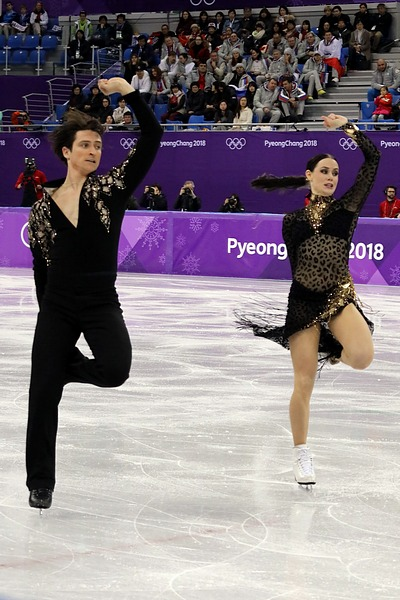
Canadian ice dancers Scott Moir and Tessa Virtue performing twizzles at the 2018 Winter Olympics

A twizzle is "a multirotational, one-foot turn that moves across the ice". It has also been defined as "a traveling turn on one foot with one or more rotations which is quickly rotated with a continuous (uninterrupted) action". Twizzles have been called "the quads of ice dance" because, like quadruple jumps in other skating disciplines, twizzles are risky and technically demanding. Twizzle sequences, when executed well, are often the highlight of ice dance programs.

According to American ice dancer Alex Shibutani, practice, relying on muscle memory, and a good partnership are the keys to performing successful twizzle sequences. American ice dancer Meryl Davis reported, when speaking about how detailed and exact the synchronization is in the execution of twizzles, that she and her partner Charlie White knew the placement of each other's feet based on the sounds their blades made on the ice. American ice dancer Maia Shibutani stated that partners need to have strong individual skating skills and that staying in the moment while executing twizzles is important.

There are four types of entry edges for twizzles: the forward inside, the forward outside, the backward inside, and the backward outside.

== See also ==
- Dance move

== Works cited ==
- Kestnbaum, Ellyn (2003). Culture on Ice: Figure Skating and Cultural Meaning. Middletown, Connecticut: Wesleyan University Press. ISBN 0819566411.
- Shulman, Carole (2002). The Complete Book of Figure Skating. Champagne, Illinois: Human Kinetics. ISBN 978-0-7360-3548-4.
