= List of United States Navy ships: C =

Ships of the United States Navy

Ships in current service
- Current ships

Ships grouped alphabetically
- A–B; C; D–F; G–H; I–K; L; M; N–O; P; Q–R; S; T–V; W–Z

Ships grouped by type
- Aircraft carriers; Airships; Amphibious warfare ships; Auxiliaries; Battlecruisers; Battleships; Cruisers; Destroyers; Destroyer escorts; Destroyer leaders; Escort carriers; Frigates; Hospital ships; Littoral combat ships; Mine warfare vessels; Monitors; Oilers; Patrol vessels; Registered civilian vessels; Sailing frigates; Steam frigates; Steam gunboats; Ships of the line; Sloops of war; Submarines; Torpedo boats; Torpedo retrievers; Unclassified miscellaneous; Yard and district craft

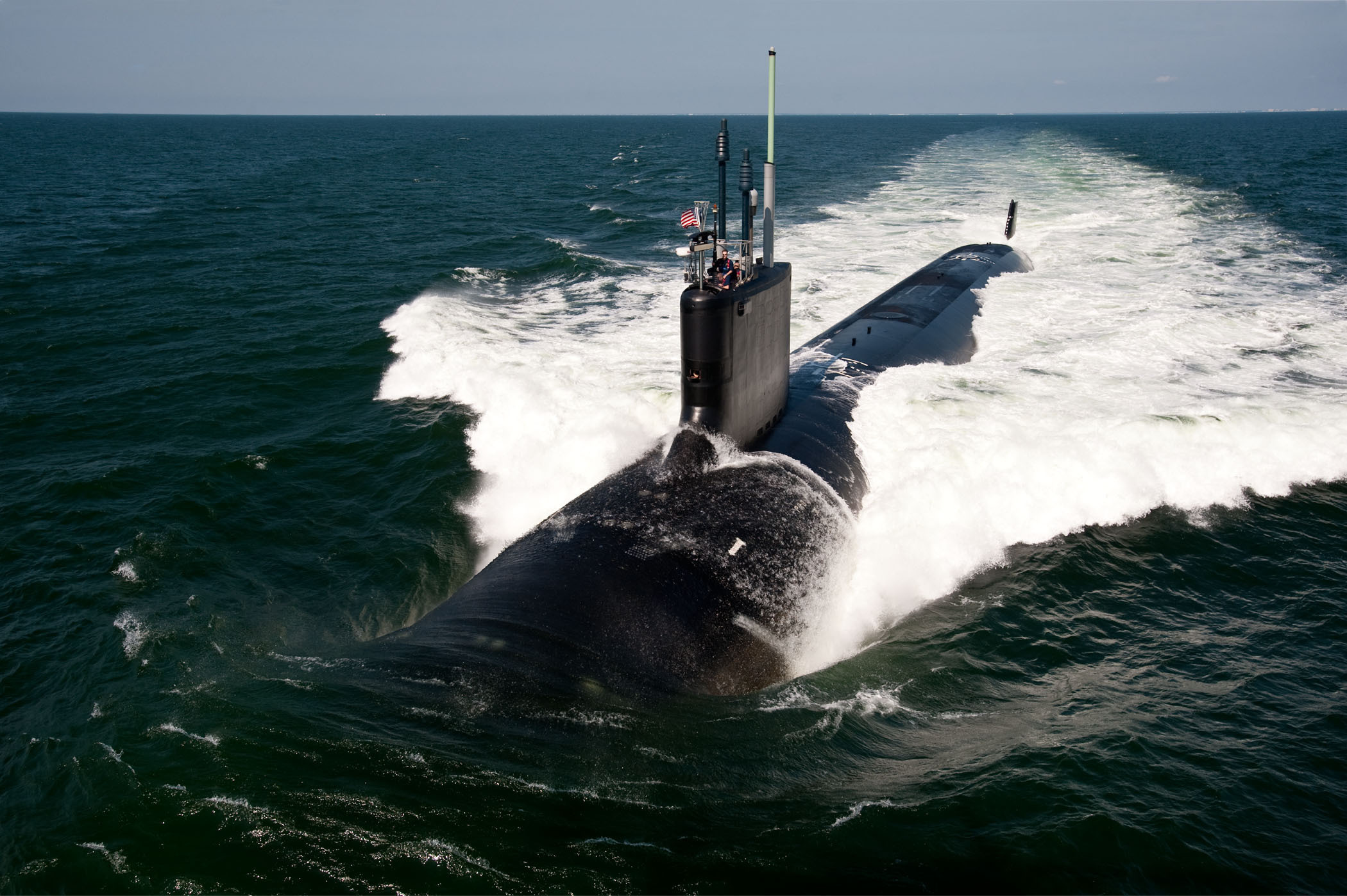
USS California (SSN-781)

This section of the list of United States Navy ships contains all ships of the United States Navy with names beginning with C.

For a list exclusively of currently commissioned ships, see the List of current ships of the United States Navy.

For ships with unique names, "USS Ship‍name" redirects to the ship article. For reused names, "USS Ship‍name" is an index page for the ships of that name; the links after the name lead to the specific ship pages.

== C ==
- USS C-1 (SS-9)
- USS C-2 (SS-13)
- USS C-3 (SS-14)
- USS C-4 (SS-15)
- USS C-5 (SS-16)
- SSV C-Champion
- SSV C-Commando
- USS C. F. Sargent (ID-3027)
- USS C. P. Williams (1861)
- USS C. W. Morse (ID-1966)

== Cab–Can ==
- USS Cabana (DE-260)
- USS Cabell (AK-166)
- USS Cabezon (SS-334/AGSS-334)
- USS Cabildo (LSD-16)
- USS Cable (ARS-19)
- USS Cabot (1775, CV-16, CV-28/CVL-28/AVT-3)
- USS Cabrilla (SS-288/AGSS-288)
- USS Cacapon (AO-52)
- USS Cachalot (SS-33, SS-170)
- USS Cache (AO-67/T-AOT-67)
- USS Cacique (ID-2213)
- USS Cactus (1863)
- USS Caddo Parish (LST-515)
- USS Cadiz (PC-1081)
- USS Cadmus (AR-14)
- USS Caelum (AK-106)
- USS Caesar (AC-16)
- USS Cahaba (AO-82/T-AO-82)
- USS Cahokia (USCGC/AT-61/YT-135/YTB-135, ATA-186)
- USS Cahto (YT-215/YTB-215)
- USS Cahuilla (AT-152/ATF-152)
- USS Caiman (SS-323)
- USS Cairo (1861)
- USS Calabash (SP-108)
- USS Caladesi (YFB-39)
- USS Calamares (ID-3662/AF-18)
- USS Calamianes (1888)
- USS Calamus (AOG-25)
- USS Calaveras County (LST-516)
- USS Calcaterra (DE-390/DER-390)
- USS Caldwell (DD-69, DD-605)
- USS Caledonia (1812, AK-167)
- USS Calhoun (1851)
- USS Calhoun County (LST-519)
- USS Calibogue (AV-19)
- USS Caliente (AO-53)
- USS California (1867, ACR-6, SP-249, SP-647, BB-44, DLGN-36/CGN-36, SSN-781)
- USS Californian (1900)
- USS Caliph (SP-272)
- USS Calistoga (YFB-21)
- USS Callaghan (DD-792, DD-994/DDG-994)
- USS Callao (PG-37/YFB-11, ID-4036, IX-205)
- USS Callaway (AP-80/APA-35)
- USS Callisto (AGP-15)
- USS Calodosi (YFB-39)
- USS Caloosahatchee (AO-98)
- USS Calumet (1894, SP-723)
- USS Calvert (SP-2274, AP-65/APA-32)
- USS Calypso (1863, SP-632, WPG-104/AG-35)
- USS Camanche (1864, ACM-11/MMA-11)
- USS Camanga (AG-42)
- USS Camano (AG-130/AKL-1)
- USS Cambria (AP-81/APA-36)
- USS Cambridge (1860, 1869, ID-1651, CA-126)
- USS Camden (ID-3143/AS-6/IX-42, AOE-2)
- USS Camel (1813, IX-113)
- USS Camelia (1862)
- USS Camellia (USLHT Camellia)
- USS Cameron (APB-50)
- USS Camia (YFB-683)
- USS Camp (DE-251/DER-251)
- USS Campti (YTB-816)
- USS Canadian River (LSM(R)-406)
- USS Canandaigua (1862, ID-1694, IX-233, PC-1246)
- USS Canarsee (YTB-703)
- USS Canary (AMc-25/YDT-7)
- USS Canasatego (YN-38/YNT-6/YTM-732)
- USS Canastota (PC-1135)
- USS Canberra (CA-70/CAG-2, LCS-30)
- USS Candid (AMc-131/AM-154/MSF-154)
- USS Candoto (YT-377/YTB-377)
- USS Caney (AO-95/T-AO-95)
- USS Canfield (DE-262)
- USS Canibas (ID-3401)
- USS Canisteo (AO-99)
- USS Cannon (DE-99)
- USS Canocan (YT-290/YTB-290)
- USS Canon (PGM-90/PG-90)
- USS Canonchet (YTB-823)
- USS Canonicus (1863, 1899, ID-1696, YT-187/YTM-187, ACM-12/MMA-12)
- USS Canopus (AS-9, AS-27/AD-33, AS-34)
- USS Canotia (YN-66/AN-47)
- USS Canton (1913)
- USS Canuck (YT-379/YTB-379)

== Cap ==
- USS Cap Finisterre (1911)
- USS Capable (AMc-132/AM-155/MSF-155, T-AGOS-16)
- USS Cape (MSI-2)
- SS Cape Adventurer (AK-5005)
- SS Cape Agent (AK-5015)
- SS Cape Aide (AK-5006)
- SS Cape Alava (AK-5012)
- SS Cape Alexander (AK-5010)
- SS Cape Ambassador (AK-5007)
- SS Cape Ann (AK-5009)
- SS Cape Archway (AK-5011)
- SS Cape Avinof (AK-5013)
- SS Cape Blanco (AK-5060)
- SS Cape Bon (AK-5059)
- SS Cape Borda (AK-5058)
- SS Cape Bover (AK-5057)
- SS Cape Breton (AK-5056)
- SS Cape Canaveral (AK-5040)
- SS Cape Canso (AK-5037)
- SS Cape Carthage (AK-5042)
- SS Cape Catawba (AK-5074)
- SS Cape Catoche (AK-5043)
- SS Cape Chalmers (AK-5036)
- SS Cape Charles (AK-5038)
- SS Cape Clear (AK-5039)
- USS Cape Cod (AD-43, AK-5041)
- MV Cape Decision (T-AKR-5054)
- MV Cape Diamond (T-AKR-5055)
- MV Cape Domingo (T-AKR-5053)
- MV Cape Douglas (T-AKR-5052)
- MV Cape Ducato (T-AKR-5051)
- MV Cape Edmont (T-AKR-5069)
- USS Cape Esperance (CVE-88/CVU-88)
- SS Cape Farewell (AK-5073)
- SS Cape Fear (AK-5061)
- USS Cape Flattery (T-AK-5070, YTT-9)
- SS Cape Florida (AK-5071)
- SS Cape Gibson (T-AK-5051)
- SS Cape Girardeau (T-AK-2039)
- USS Cape Gloucester (CVE-109/CVHE-109/AKV-9)
- USS Cape Henry (ID-3056, T-AKR-5067)
- MV Cape Horn (T-AKR-5068)
- MV Cape Hudson (T-AKR-5066)
- SS Cape Inscription (T-AKR-5076)
- SS Cape Intrepid (T-AKR-11)
- SS Cape Isabel (T-AKR-5062)
- SS Cape Island (T-AKR-10)
- SS Cape Jacob (T-AK-5029)
- SS Cape John (AK-5022)
- USS Cape Johnson (AP-172, AK-5075)
- SS Cape Juby (AK-5077)
- MV Cape Kennedy (T-AKR-5083)
- MV Cape Knox (T-AKR-5082)
- MV Cape Lambert (AKR-5077)
- MV Cape Lobos (AKR-5078)
- USS Cape Lookout (ID-3214)
- USS Cape May (ID-3520, T-AKR-5063)
- USS Cape May County (LST-521)
- SS Cape Mendocino (AKR-5064)
- SS Cape Mohican (T-AKR-5065)
- SS Cape Nome (AK-1014/T-AKR-1014)
- MV Cape Orlando (T-AKR-2044)
- MV Cape Race (T-AKR-9960)
- MV Cape Ray (T-AKR-9679)
- MV Cape Rise (T-AKR-9678)
- USS Cape Romain (ID-2970)
- USS Cape St. George (CG-71)
- MV Cape Taylor (T-AKR-113)
- MV Cape Texas (T-AKR-112)
- MV Cape Trinity (T-AKR-9711)
- MV Cape Victory (T-AKR-9701)
- MV Cape Vincent (T-AKR-9666)
- MV Cape Washington (T-AKR-9961)
- MV Cape Wrath (T-AKR-9962)
- USS Capelin (SS-289)
- USS Capella (AK-13, T-AK-293/T-AKR-293)
- USS Caperton (DD-650)
- USS Capidoli (SS-335)
- USS Capitaine (SS-336/AGSS-336)
- USS Capodanno (DE-1093/FF-1093)
- USS Capps (DD-550)
- USS Caprice (SP-703, PG-90)
- USS Capricornus (AKA-57/LKA-57)
- MV Capt. Steven L. Bennett (T-AK-4296)
- USNS Captain Arlo L. Olson (T-AK-245)
- USS Captain Dud (ID-3507)
- USS Captiva (YFB-25)
- USS Captivate (AMc-133/AM-156/MSF-156)
- USS Captor (PYc-40)

== Car–Cay ==
- USS Caracara (AMc-40)
- USS Carascan (YTB-511/YTM-774)
- USS Caravan (AMc-134/AM-157/MSF-157)
- USS Carbonero (SS-337/AGSS-337)
- USS Card (AVG-11/ACV-11/CVE-11/CVHE-11/CVU-11/T-CVU-11/T-AKV-40)
- USS Cardinal (AM-6, AM-67, AM-393, AMS-4/MSC(O)-4, MHC-60)
- USNS Cardinal O'Connell (T-AKV-7)
- USS Cariama (AM-354)
- USS Carib (ID-1765, AT-78, AT-82/ATF-82)
- USS Caribou (IX-114)
- USS Carina (AK-74)
- USNS Carl Brashear (T-AKE-7)
- USS Carl M. Levin (DDG-120)
- USS Carl R. Gray (ID-2671)
- USS Carl Vinson (CVN-70)
- USS Carlinville (PC-1120)
- USS Carlisle (APA-69)
- USS Carlotta (SP-1785)
- USS Carlson (DE-9)
- USS Carmi (PC-466)
- USS Carmick (DD-493/DMS-33)
- USS Carmita (1862, IX-152)
- USS Carnation (1863)
- USS Carnegie (AVG-38/ACV-38/CVE-38)
- USS Carnelian (PY-19)
- USS Carney (DDG-64)
- USS Carola IV (SP-812)
- USS Carolina (1812, 1906)
- USS Caroline (SP-1105)
- USS Caroline County (LST-525)
- USS Carolinian (ID-1445)
- USS Carolita (PYc-38)
- USS Carolyn (ID-1608)
- MV Carolyn Chouest
- USS Caron (DD-970)
- USS Carondelet (1861, IX-136)
- USS Carp (SS-20, SS-338/AGSS-338/IXSS-338)
- USS Carpellotti (DE-548, DE-720/APD-136)
- USS Carpenter (DD-825/DDK-825/DDE-825)
- USS Carr (FFG-52)
- USS Carrabasset (1864, AT-35/WAT-35)
- USS Carrie Clark (ID-1238)
- USS Carrillo (ID-1406)
- USS Carroll (DE-171)
- USS Carronade (IFS-1/LFR-1)
- USS Carson City (PG-158/PF-50, T-JHSV-7/T-EPF-7)
- USS Carter (DE-112)
- USS Carter Hall (APM-3/LSD-3, LSD-50)
- USS Carteret (APA-70)
- USNS Carthage (T-AG-185)
- USS Casa Grande (LSD-13)
- USS Casablanca (ACV-55/CVE-55)
- USS Cascade (AD-16)
- USS Casco (1864, 1910, AVP-12/WAVP-370/WHEC-370)
- USS Case (DD-285, DD-370)
- USS Casimir Pulaski (SSBN-633)
- USS Casinghead (YO-47)
- USS Casper (PG-120/PF-12)
- USS Caspian (ID-1380)
- USS Cassia County (LST-527)
- USS Cassin (DD-43, DD-372)
- USS Cassin Young (DD-793)
- USS Cassiopeia (AK-75)
- USS Cassius (1883)
- USS Castine (PG-6, IX-211)
- USS Castle (DD-720)
- USS Castle Rock (AVP-35/WAVP-383/WHEC-383)
- USS Castor (1869, AKS-1)
- USS Castro (SP-621)
- USS Caswell (AKA-72)
- USS Catahoula Parish (LST-528)
- USS Catalpa (1864, YN-5/AN-10)
- USS Catamount (LSD-17)
- USS Catapult (YV-1)
- USS Catawba (1864, YT-32/YTM-32, AT-68, ATA-210, T-ATF-168)
- USS Catbird (AM-68/IX-183)
- USS Catclaw (AN-60/YN-81)
- USS Cates (DE-763)
- USS Catfish (SS-339)
- USS Catherine Johnson (SP-390)
- USS Catlin (AP-19)
- USS Catoctin (AGC-5)
- USS Catron (APA-71)
- USS Catskill (1862, AP-106/CM-6/LSV-1/MCS-1)
- USS Caution (AMc-135/AM-158/MSF-158)
- USS Cauto (ID-1538)
- USS Cavalier (AP-82/APA-37)
- USS Cavalla (SS-244/SSK-244/AGSS-244, SSN-684)
- USS Cavallaro (DE-712/APD-128)
- USS Cayuga (1861, 1892, YT-12, LST-1186)
- USS Cayuga County (LST-529)

== Ce ==
- USS Cebu (ARG-6)
- USS Cecil (APR-4, APA-96)
- USS Cecil J. Doyle (DE-368)
- USS Cedar
- USS Cedar Creek (AO-138/T-AO-138)
- USS Celebes (ID-2680)
- USS Celeno (AK-76)
- USS Celeritas (SP-665)
- USS Celtic (AF-2, IX-137)
- USS Centaur (1863)
- USS Centaurus (AK-66/AKA-17, AK-264)
- USS Centipede (1814)
- USS Cepheus (AK-67/AKA-18, AK-265)
- USS Cerberus (ARL-43)
- USS Ceres (1856)
- USS Cero (SP-1189, SS-225)
- USNS Cesar Chavez (T-AKE-14)
- USS Cetus (AK-77)

== Cha ==
- USS Chachalaca (AMc-41)
- USS Chadron (PC-564)
- USS Chafee (DDG-90)
- USS Chaffee (DE-230)
- USS Chaffinch (AM-81, AMCU-18)
- USS Chahao (YTB-496)
- USS Chain (ARS-20/T-AGOR-17)
- USS Chalcedony (PYc-16)
- USS Challenge (SP-1015/AT-59/YT-126/YTM-126, ATA-201)
- USS Challenger (ID-3630)
- USS Chambers (DE-391/WDE-491/DER-391)
- USS Chame (1918)
- USS Champion (1777, 1859, AM-314/MSF-314, MCM-4)
- USS Champlin (DD-104, DD-601)
- USS Chanagi (YT-380/YTB-380)
- USS Chancellorsville (CG-62)
- USS Chandeleur (AV-10)
- USS Chandler (DD-206/DMS-9/AG-108, DD-996/DDG-996)
- USS Chandra (ARL-46)
- USS Change (AMc-136/AM-159/MSF-159)
- USS Chanticleer (SP-663, AMc-60, ASR-7)
- USS Chapin Bay (AVG-63/ACV-63)
- USS Chaplin Bay (CVE-99)
- USS Chara (AKA-58/AE-31)
- USS Charger (AVG-30/ACV-30/CVE-30)
- USS Chariton River (LSM(R)-407)
- USS Charles (ID-1298)
- USS Charles Ausburn (DD-294)
- USS Charles Ausburne (DD-570)
- USS Charles B. Mason (SP-1225)
- USS Charles Berry (DE-1035)
- USS Charles Carroll (AP-58/APA-28)
- USNS Charles Drew (T-AKE-10)
- USS Charles E. Brannon (DE-446)
- USS Charles F. Adams (DD-952/DDG-2)
- USS Charles F. Hughes (DD-428)
- USNS Charles H. Davis (T-AGOR-5)
- USS Charles H. Roan (DD-853)
- USS Charles J. Badger (DD-657)
- USS Charles J. French (DDG-142)
- USS Charles J. Kimmel (DE-584)
- USS Charles Lawrence (DE-53/APD-37)
- USS Charles Mann (SP-522)
- USS Charles P. Cecil (DD-835/DDR-835)
- USS Charles P. Crawford (SP-366)
- USS Charles P. Kuper (SP-1235)
- USS Charles Phelps (1848)
- USS Charles R. Greer (DE-23)
- USS Charles R. Ware (DD-865, DE-547)
- USS Charles River (LSM(R)-408)
- USS Charles S. Sperry (DD-697)
- USS Charles Whittemore (ID-3232)
- USS Charleston (1798, C-2, C-22/CA-19, PG-51, AKA-113/LKA-113, LCS-18)
- USS Charlevoix (AK-168)
- USS Charlotte (1862, CA-12, PG-168/PF-60, SSN-766)
- USS Charlottesville (PG-133/PF-25)
- USNS Charlton (T-AKR-314)
- USS Charlton Hall (ID-1359)
- USS Charmian II (SP-696)
- USS Charr (SS-328/AGSS-328/IXSS-328)
- USS Charrette (DD-581)
- USS Charybdis (1869)
- USS Chase (DD-323, DE-158/APD-54)
- USS Chase County (LST-532/T-LST-532)
- USS Chase S. Osborne (SP-1121/YT-41)
- USS Chaska (YT-226/YTB-226)
- USS Chateau Thierry (AP-31)
- USS Chatelain (DE-149)
- USS Chatham (1836, ID-2510, AVG-32/ACV-32/CVE-32, AK-169)
- USS Chatot (AT-167/ATA-167)
- USNS Chattahoochee (T-AOG-82/T-AOT-82)
- USS Chattanooga (1864, C-16/PG-30/CL-18, PG-173/PF-65, CL-118)
- USS Chatterer (AMc-16, AMS-40/MSC(O)-40)
- USS Chaumont (AP-5)
- USS Chauncey (DD-3, DD-296, DD-667)
- USS Chauvenet (AGS-11, T-AGS-29)
- USS Chawasha (AT-151/ATF-151)

== Che–Chu ==
- USS Chebaulip (ID-3141)
- USS Cheboygan County (LST-533)
- USS Chegodega (YTB-542/YTM-542)
- USS Chehalis (AOG-48, PGM-94/PG-94)
- USS Chekilli (YT-175/YTB-175/YTM-175)
- USS Chelan County (LST-542)
- USS Cheleb (AK-138)
- USS Chemung (AT-18/YT-124, AO-30)
- USS Chenango (1863, AO-31/AVG-28/ACV-28/CVE-28/CVHE-28)
- USS Cheng Ho (IX-52)
- USS Chepachet (AO-78/T-AOT-78)
- USS Chepanoc (YT-381/YTB-381/YTM-381)
- USS Cheraw (YTB-802)
- USS Cherokee (1864, SP-1104, SP-458, AT-66/ATF-66/WAT-165/WMEC-165)
- USNS Cherokee Nation (T-ATS-7)
- USS Chesaning (YTB-769)
- USS Chesapeake (1799, 1898, ID-3395, T-AOT-5084, FFG-64)
- USS Chestatee (AOG-49/T-AOG-49)
- USS Chester (CL-1, CA-27/CL-27)
- USS Chester T. O'Brien (DE-421)
- USS Chesterfield County (LST-551)
- USS Chestnut (YN-6/AN-11)
- USS Chestnut Hill (ID-2526)
- USS Chetco (AT-99, AT-166/ATA-166)
- USS Chetek (YTB-827)
- USS Chevalier (DD-451, DD-805/DDR-805)
- USS Chew (DD-106)
- USS Chewaucan (AOG-50)
- USS Chewink (AM-39/ASR-3, AMCU-19)
- USS Cheyenne (1898, BM-10/IX-4, CL-86, CL-117, T-AG-174, SSN-773)
- USS Chicago (CA-14/CL-14, CL-29/CA-29, CA-136/CG-11, SSN-721)
- USS Chichota (SP-65)
- USS Chickadee (AM-59/MSF-59)
- USS Chickasaw (1864, 1882, AT-83/ATF-83)
- USS Chickwick (SS-340)
- USS Chicolar (SS-464)
- USS Chicomico (YT-378/YTB-378/YTM-378)
- USS Chicopee (1863, AO-34, YTM-747)
- USS Chicot (AK-170)
- USS Chief (AMc-67, AM-315/MSF-315, MCM-14)
- USS Chikaskia (AO-54)
- USS Childs (DD-241/AVP-14/AVD-1)
- USS Chilhowee (SP-525)
- USS Chilkat (YTB-510/YTM-773)
- USS Chillicothe (1862, USCGC)
- USS Chilton (AP-83/APA-38/LPA-38)
- USS Chilula (AT-153/ATF-153/WATF-153/WMEC-153)
- USS Chimaera (ARL-33)
- USS Chimango (AMc-42, AMCU-20)
- USS Chimariko (AT-154/ATF-154)
- USS Chimo (1864, AT-22, ACM-1)
- USS Chimon (AG-150/AKS-31)
- USS Chinaberry (YN-82/AN-61)
- USS Chinampa (ID-1952)
- USS Chincoteague (1919, AVP-24/WAVP-375/WHEC-375, WPB-1320)
- USS Chingachgook (SP-35)
- USS Chinook (SP-644, PC-9)
- USS Chinquapin (YN-12/AN-17)
- USS Chipola (AO-63)
- USS Chipper (SP-256, SP-1049)
- USS Chippewa (1813, 1814, 1815, 1861, AT-69/ATF-69)
- USS Chiquito (YTB-499/YTM-765)
- USS Chiron (AGP-18)
- USS Chittenden County (LST-561)
- USS Chivo (SS-341)
- USS Chiwaukum (AOG-26)
- USS Chiwawa (AO-68)
- USS Chloris (ARV(E)-4/ARVE-4)
- USS Choctaw (1856, 1898, ID-1648, YT-114, AT-70/ATF-70)
- USNS Choctaw County (T-JHSV-2/T-EPF-2)
- USS Chocura (1861, IX-206)
- USS Chohonaga (YTB-500/YTM-766)
- USS Cholocco (YTB-498/YTM-764)
- USS Chopper (SS-342/AGSS-342/IXSS-342)
- USS Choptank (YT-36/YTM-36)
- USS Chosin (CG-65)
- USS Chotank (1861)
- USS Chotauk (IX-188)
- USS Chourre (ARV-1)
- USS Chowanoc (AT-100/ATF-100)
- USS Christabel (SP-162)
- USS Christiana (IX-80/YAG-32)
- USS Christine (YT-106/YFB-13, ID-2058)
- USS Christopher (DE-100)
- USS Chub (SS-329)
- USS Chukawan (AO-100)
- USS Chukor (AM-355, AMS-70/MSC-70)
- USS Chung-Hoon (DDG-93)
- USS Churchill County (LST-583)

== Ci ==
- USS Cigarette (SP-1234)
- USS Cimarron (1862, AO-22, AO-177)
- USS Cimerone (1862)
- USS Cinchona (YN-7/AN-12)
- USS Cincinnati (1861, C-7, CL-6, SSN-693, LCS-20)
- USS Cinnabar (IX-163)
- USS Cinnamon (YN-69/AN-50)
- USS Circassian (1862)
- USS Circe (1869, AKA-25)
- USS Cisco (SS-290)
- USNS City of Bismarck (T-EPF-9)
- USS City of Corpus Christi (SSN-705)
- USS City of Dalhart (IX-156)
- USS City of Lewes (SP-383)
- USS City of Pekin (1874)
- USS City of South Haven (ID-2527)

== Cl ==
- USS Claiborne (AK-171)
- USS Clamagore (SS-343)
- USS Clamour (AMc-137/AM-160/MSF-160)
- USS Clamp (ARS-33)
- USS Clara Dolsen (1862)
- USS Clare (ID-2774)
- USS Clarence K. Bronson (DD-668)
- USS Clarence L. Evans (DE-113)
- USS Clarendon (APA-72)
- USS Clarinda (SP-185/YP-185)
- USS Clarion (AK-172)
- USS Clarion River (LSM(R)-409/LFR-409)
- USS Clark (DD-361, FFG-11)
- USS Clark Fork River (LSM(R)-410)
- USNS Clarksburg (T-AG-183)
- USS Clarke County (LST-601)
- USS Clash (PG-91)
- USS Claud Jones (DE-1033)
- USS Claude V. Ricketts (DDG-5)
- USS Claxton (DD-140, DD-571)
- USS Clay (AP-84/APA-39)
- USS Clearfield (APA-142)
- USS Clearwater (YOG-47)
- USS Clearwater County (LST-602)
- USS Cleburne (APA-73)
- USS Clematis (1863)
- USS Clemson (DD-186/AVP-17/AVD-4/APD-31, T-AG-184)
- USS Cleo (SP-232)
- USS Clermont (APA-143)
- USS Cleveland (C-19/PG-33/CL-21, CL-55, AK-851, LPD-7, LCS-31)
- USS Cliffrose (YN-61/AN-42)
- USS Clifford D. Mallory (YAG-49)
- USS Clifton (1861, ID-2080, IX-184)
- USS Clifton Sprague (FFG-16)
- USS Climax (AMc-138/AM-161/MSF-161)
- USS Clinton (1864, APA-144/LPA-144)
- USS Clio (ID-2578, ID-2279)
- USS Cloues (DE-265)
- USS Clover (1863, 1899)
- USS Clyde (1863, IX-144)
- USS Clytie (AS-26)

== Coa–Com ==
- USS Coastal Battleship No. 1 (BB-1)
- USS Coastal Battleship No. 2 (BB-2)
- USS Coastal Battleship No. 4 (IX-6)
- USS Coastal Crusader (ORV-16/T-AGM-16/AGS-36)
- USNS Coastal Sentry (T-AGM-15)
- USS Coasters Harbor (AG-74/AKS-22)
- USS Coates (DE-685/APD-138)
- USS Coatopa (YT-382/YTB-382/YTM-382)
- USS Cobbler (SS-344)
- USS Cobia (SS-245/AGSS-245)
- USS Cobra (SP-626)
- USS Cochali (YT-383/YTB-383/YTM-383)
- USS Cochino (SS-345)
- USS Cochise (YT-216/YTB-216)
- USS Cochrane (DDG-21)
- USS Cockatoo (AMc-8, AMCU-21)
- USS Cockenoe (YN-47/YNT-15/YTB-736)
- USS Cockrill (DE-398)
- USS Coco (SP-110)
- USS Coconino County (LST-603)
- USS Cocopa (AT-101/ATF-101)
- USS Cod (SS-224/AGSS-224/IXSS-224)
- USS Codington (AK-173)
- USNS Cody (T-EPF-14)
- USS Coeur de Lion (1861)
- USS Cofer (DE-208/APD-62)
- USS Coffman (DE-191)
- USS Coghlan (DD-326, DD-606)
- USS Cogswell (DD-651)
- USS Cohasset (1860, 1918, IX-198)
- USS Cohocton (AO-101/T-AO-101)
- USS Cohoes (1867, YN-97/AN-78/ANL-78)
- USS Colahan (DD-658)
- USS Colbert (APA-145)
- USS Cole (DD-155/AG-116, DDG-67)
- USS Colfax (1917)
- USS Colhoun (DD-85/APD-2, DD-801)
- USS Colington (YFB-43, AG-148/AKS-29)
- USS Colleen (PYc-27/WPYc-27)
- USS Colleton (APL-36/APB-36)
- USS Collett (DD-730)
- USS Collier (1864)
- USS Collingsworth (APA-146/LPA-146)
- USS Colonel Harney (1840)
- USS Colonel Kinsman (1862)
- USNS Colonel William J. O'Brien (T-AK-246)
- USS Colonial (LSD-18)
- USS Colorado (1856, ACR-7, BB-45, SSN-788)
- USS Colossus (1864, 1869)
- USS Colquitt (AK-174)
- USS Columbia (1814, 1836, 1862, 1864, C-12/CA-16, AG-9, CL-56, T-AO-182/T-AOT-182, SSN-771)
- USS Columbine (1862, 1917)
- USS Columbus (1774, 1819, CA-74/CG-12, SSN-762)
- USS Colusa (APA-74)
- USS Comanche (1896, AT-20, WMEC-202)
- USS Combat (AMc-68, AMc-69)
- USS Comber (SP-344, SS-527)
- USS Comet (1810, SP-772, AP-166, T-AK-269/T-LSV-7/T-AKR-7)
- USS Cometa (1918)
- USS Comfort (AH-3, AH-6, T-AH-20)
- USS Commander (SP-1247)
- USS Commencement Bay (CVE-105/CVHE-105/AKV-37)
- USS Commerce (ID-2763)
- USS Commodore (1863, SP-1425, IX-7, 401B)
- USS Commodore Barney (1859)
- USS Commodore Hull (1862)
- USS Commodore Jones (1863)
- USS Commodore Maury (SP-656)
- USS Commodore McDonough (1862)
- USS Commodore Morris (1862)
- USS Commodore Perry (1859)
- USS Commodore Read (1857)
- USS Commodore Truxtun (1863)
- USS Compass Island (EAG-153)
- USS Compel (AMc-139/AM-162/MSF-162)
- USS Competent (AM-316/MSF-316, AFDM-6)
- USS Compton (DD-705)
- USS Comrade (AMc-69)
- USS Comstock (LSD-19, LSD-45)
- USS Comte de Grasse (DD-974)

== Con–Coq ==
- USS Conanicut (YFB-15)
- USS Conasauga (AOG-15)
- USS Conchardee (YTB-412/YTM-412)
- USS Concho (AO-102)
- USS Concise (AMc-140/AM-163/MSF-163)
- USS Concord (1828, PG-3, SP-773, CL-10, AFS-5/T-AFS-5)
- USS Condor (AM-11, AMc-14, AMS-5/MSC(O)-5)
- USS Cone (DD-866)
- USS Conecuh (AO-103, AO-110/AOR-110)
- USS Conemaugh (1862, AOG-62)
- USS Conestoga (1861, 1862, SP-1128/AT-54)
- USS Confederacy (1778)
- USS Confiance (1814, 1865)
- USS Conflict (AM-85, AM-426/MSO-426)
- USS Congaree (IX-84)
- USS Conger (SS-477/AGSS-477)
- USS Congress (1776, 1777, 1799, 1841, 1868, ID-3698, FFG-63)
- USS Conklin (DE-439)
- USS Conn (DE-80)
- USS Conneaut (PCS-1444)
- USS Connecticut (1776, 1799, 1861, 1899, BB-18, SSN-22)
- USS Conner (DD-72, DD-582)
- USS Connewango (YT-388/YTB-388/YTM-388)
- USS Connole (DE-1056/FF-1056)
- USS Connolly (DE-306)
- USS Conohasset (YT-389/YTB-389)
- USS Conolly (DD-979)
- USS Conqueror (AMc-70)
- USS Conquest (1812, AMc-71, AM-488/MSO-488)
- USS Conserver (ARS-39)
- USS Consolation (AH-15)
- USS Consort (1836)
- USS Constance II (SP-633)
- USS Constant (AM-86, AM-427/MSO-427)
- USS Constantia (1890)
- USS Constellation (1797, 1854/IX-20, CC-2, CVA-64/CV-64, FFG-62)
- USS Constitution
- USS Continental
- USNS Contender (T-AGOS-2)
- USS Content (SP-538)
- USS Contocook (AT-36)
- USS Contoocook (1864, AO-104)
- USS Control (AMc-141/AM-164/MSF-164)
- USS Conus (ARL-44)
- USS Converse (DD-291, DD-509)
- USS Conway (DD-70, DD-507/DDE-507)
- USS Cony (DD-508/DDE-508)
- USS Conyngham (DD-58, DD-371, DDG-17)
- USS Cook (DE-714/APD-130, DE-1083/FF-1083)
- USS Cook Inlet (AVP-36/WAVP-384/WHEC-384)
- USS Coolbaugh (DE-217)
- USS Cooner (DE-172)
- USS Coontz (DL-9/DLG-9/DDG-40)
- USS Cooper (DD-695)
- USS Cooperstown (LCS-23)
- USS Coos Bay (AVP-25/WAVP-376/WHEC-376)
- USS Copahee (AVG-12/ACV-12/CVE-12/CVHE-12)
- USS Copeland (FFG-25)
- USS Coquet (1906)
- USS Coquille (PCS-1400)

== Cor–Cp ==
- USS Cor Caroli (AK-91)
- USS Coral (PY-15)
- USS Coral Sea (ACV-57/CVE-57, CV-42, CV-43/CVB-43/CVA-43)
- USS Corbesier (DE-106/DE-438)
- USS Corbitant (YT-354/YTM-354)
- USS Cordele (PC-1125)
- USS Cordova (AVG-39/ACV-39/CVE-39)
- USS Corduba (AF-32)
- USS Core (AVG-13/ACV-13/CVE-13/CVHE-13/T-CVU-13/T-AKV-41)
- USS Corinth (PC-1547)
- USS Corinthia (SP-938)
- USS Corkwood (YN-63/AN-44)
- USS Cormorant (AM-40/AT-133/ATO-133, AMS-122/MSC-122, MHC-57)
- USS Cornel (YN-64/AN-45)
- SS Cornhusker State (T-ACS-6)
- USS Cornubia (1858)
- USS Corona (SP-813)
- USS Coronado (PG-146/PF-38, LPD-11/AGF-11/T-AGF-11, LCS-4)
- USS Coronet (SP-194)
- USS Coronis (ARL-10)
- USS Corozal (1911)
- USS Corporal (SS-346)
- USS Corporation (1814)
- USS Corpus Christi (PG-152/PF-44)
- USNS Corpus Christi Bay (T-ARVH-1)
- USS Corregidor (ACV-58/CVE-58/T-CVU-58)
- USS Corry (DD-334, DD-463, DD-817/DDR-817)
- USS Corsair (SP-159, SS-435/AGSS-435)
- USS Corson (AVP-37)
- USS Cortland (APA-75)
- USS Corundum (IX-164)
- USS Corvina (SS-226)
- USS Corvus (AKA-26)
- USS Corwin (1849, 1876)
- MV Cory Chouest
- USS Corypheus (1862)
- USS Coshecton (YT-404/YTB-404/YTM-404)
- USS Cossack (1861, SP-695)
- USS Cossatot (AO-77/T-AOT-77)
- USS Cotinga (AMc-43, AMCU-22)
- USS Cotton (DE-81)
- USS Cotten (DD-669)
- USS Cottonwood (YN-8)
- USS Cottle (APA-147/LPA-147)
- USS Coucal (ASR-8)
- USS Counsel (AMc-142/AM-165/MSF-165)
- USS Courage (PG-70)
- HSV Courageous (JHSV-7)
- USS Courier (1861, 1912, AMc-72, T-AK-5019)
- USS Courlan (AMc-44, AMS-44/MSC(O)-44)
- USS Courser (AMc-32, AMS-6/MSC(O)-6)
- USS Courtenay P (SP-899)
- USS Courtney (DE-1021)
- USS Cove (MSI-1)
- USS Covington (1863, ID-1409, PG-164/PF-56)
- USS Cowanesque (AO-79/T-AO-79/T-AOT-79)
- USS Cowell (DD-139, DD-167, DD-547)
- USS Cowie (DD-632/DMS-39)
- USS Cowpens (CV-25/CVL-25/AVT-1, CG-63)
- USS Cowslip (1863)
- USS Coyote (SP-84)
- USS Cozy (SP-556)
- MV Cpl Louis J. Hauge Jr. (T-AK-3000)

== Cr ==
- USS Crag (AM-214/MSF-214)
- USS Craig (AM-214)
- USS Craighead (AK-175)
- USS Crane (DD-109)
- USS Crane Ship No. 1 (AB-1)
- USS Crandall (YHLC-2)
- USS Cranstoun (DE-82)
- USS Craster Hall (ID-1486)
- USS Crater (AK-70)
- USS Craven (TB-10, DD-70, DD-382)
- USS Cread (DE-227/APD-88)
- USS Creamer (DE-308)
- USS Creddock (AM-356/MSF-356)
- USS Credenda (ID-3278)
- USS Cree (AT-84/ATF-84)
- USS Crenshaw (APA-76)
- USS Creon (ARL-11)
- USS Crescent City (AP-40/APA-21)
- USS Crest (SP-339)
- USS Crestview (PCE-895)
- USS Crevalle (SS-291/AGSS-291)
- USS Criccieth (1918)
- USS Cricket (1862)
- USS Crilley (YHLC-1)
- USS Crittenden (APA-77)
- USS Croaker (SS-246/SSK-246/AGSS-246/IXSS-246)
- USS Croatan (AVG-14/ACV-14/CVE-14, AVG-25/ACV-25/CVE-25/CVHE-25/T-CVU-25/T-AKV-43)
- USS Crockett (APA-148, PGM-88/PG-88)
- USS Crocus (1862, WAGL-210)
- USS Crommelin (FFG-37)
- USS Cromwell (DE-1014)
- USS Cronin (DE-107, DE-704/DEC-704)
- USS Crook County (LST-611)
- USS Crosby (DD-164/APD-17)
- USS Crosley (DE-108, DE-226/APD-87)
- USS Cross (DE-448)
- USS Crossbill (AMc-9, AMS-45/MSC(O)-45)
- USS Crouter (DE-11)
- USS Crow (AMc-20, AMS-7/MSC(O)-7)
- USS Crowley (DE-303)
- USS Crown Point (CV-27, CV-32)
- USS Crownblock (YO-48)
- USS Crowninshield (DD-134)
- USS Cruise (AM-215/MSF-215)
- USS Crusader (1858, ARS-2)
- USS Crux (AK-115)
- USS Crystal (PY-25)

== Cu–Cy ==
- USS Cubera (SS-347)
- USS Cubitt (DE-83)
- USS Culebra Island (ARG-7)
- USS Culgoa (AF-3)
- USS Cullman (APA-78)
- USS Culpeper (PC-1240)
- USS Cumberland (1842, IX-8, AO-153/T-AO-153)
- USS Cumberland River (LSM(R)-411)
- USS Cumberland Sound (AV-17)
- USS Cummings (DD-44, DD-365)
- USS Curacao (ID-2269/YO-36)
- USS Curb (ARS-21)
- USS Curlew (1862, AM-8, AM-69/IX-170, AMS-8/MSC(O)-8)
- USS Current (ARS-22)
- USS Currier (DE-700)
- USS Currituck (1843, AV-7)
- USS Curry County (LST-685)
- USS Curtis W. Howard (DE-752)
- USS Curtis Wilbur (DDG-54)
- USS Curtiss (AV-4, T-AVB-4)
- USS Curts (FFG-38)
- USS Curzon (DE-84)
- USS Cusabo (AT-155/ATF-155)
- USS Cushing (TB-1, DD-55, DD-376, DD-797, DD-985)
- USS Cusk (SS-348/SSG-348/AGSS-348)
- USS Cusseta (YT-405/YTB-405/YTM-405)
- USS Custer (AP-85/APA-40)
- USS Cutlass (SS-478)
- USS Cuttlefish (SS-11, SS-171)
- USS Cuttyhunk Island (AG-75/AKS-23)
- USS Cuyahoga (WIX-57/AG-26/YX-21)
- USS Cuyama (AO-3)
- USS Cyane (1815, 1837, TB-16/YFB-4)
- USS Cybele (AKS-10)
- USS Cyclone (PC-1/WPC-1)
- USS Cyclops (1869, AC-4)
- USS Cygnus (AF-23)
- USS Cymophane (PYc-26)
- USCGC Cypress (WAGL-211, WLB-210)
- USS Cyrene (AGP-13)
- USS Cythera (SP-575/PY-26, PY-31)
