= USS Conquest =

USS Conquest is a name used more than once by the U.S. Navy:

- USS Conquest (1812), a merchant ship Genesee Packet, was purchased 8 October 1812.
- USS Conquest (AMc-71), a coastal minesweeper placed in service 9 March 1942.
- USS Conquest (AM-488), a minesweeper launched 20 May 1954.
