= USS Clinton =

USS Clinton is a name used more than once by the U.S. Navy:

- USS Clinton (1864), a screw tug purchased 14 June 1864.
- USS Clinton (APA-144), an attack transport commissioned 1 February 1945.
