= USS Chinook =

USS Chinook has been the name of more than one United States Navy ship, and may refer to:

- USS Chinook (SP-644), a patrol vessel in commission from 1917 to 1918
- USS Chinook (PC-9), a patrol vessel in commission since 1995
