= USS Cape Johnson =

USS Cape Johnson has been the name of two ships in the service of the United States Navy.

- USS Cape Johnson (AP-172), was a troop transport used during World War II.
- USNS Cape Johnson, is a reserve vessel in the service of the Military Sealift Command.
