= USS Carrillo =

Cargo ship of the United States Navy

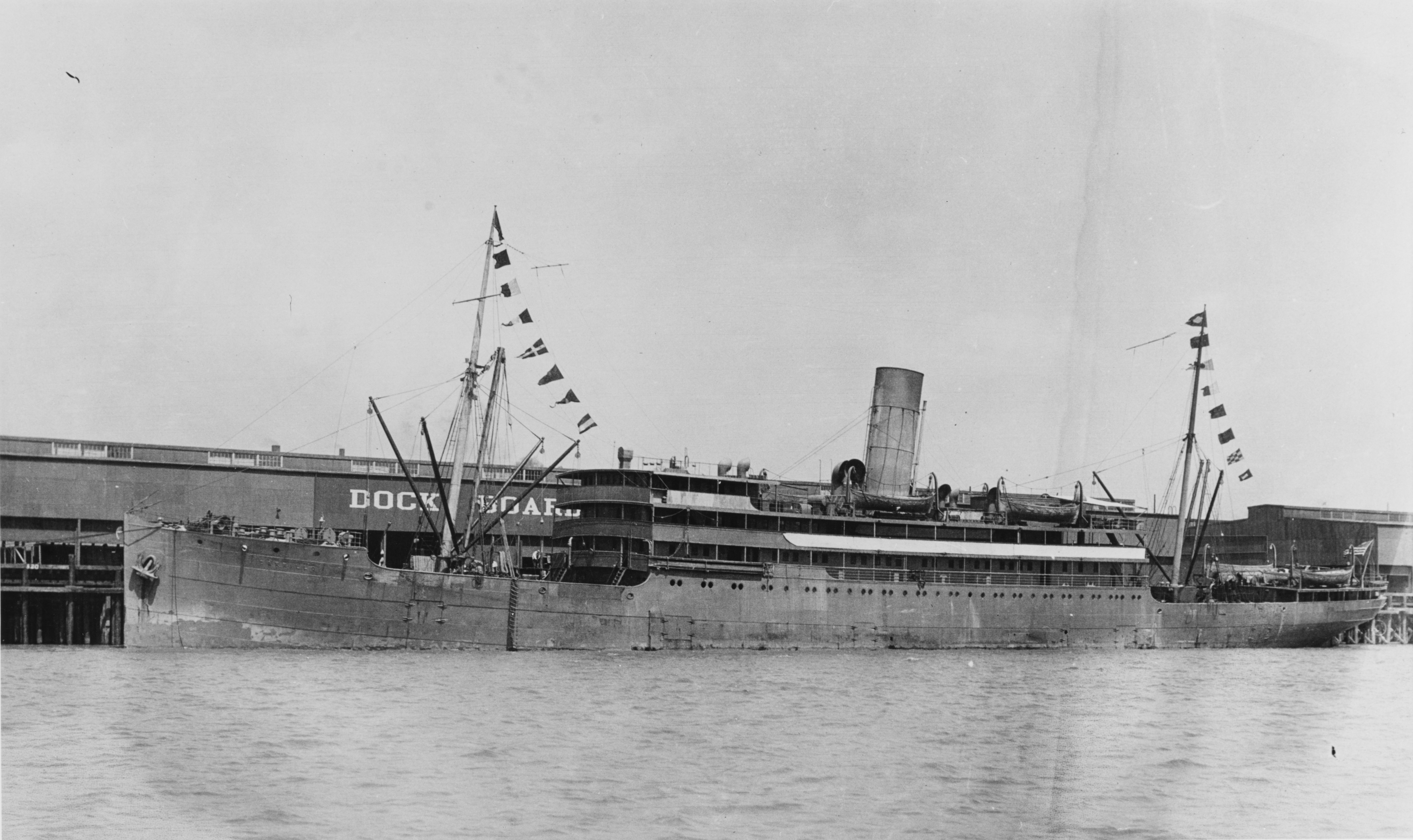
- SS Carrillo ca. 1918, prior to her U.S. Navy service.

History

United States
- Name: USS Carrillo
- Namesake: Previous name retained
- Builder: Workman, Clark and Company, Belfast
- Launched: 17 May 1911
- Completed: 1911
- Acquired: 16 September 1918
- Commissioned: 16 September 1918
- Decommissioned: 28 April 1919
- Fate: Transferred to United States Shipping Board 8 May 1919
- Notes: In commercial service 1911-1918 and 1919-1947; Laid up 1947; Sold for scrapping March 1948

General characteristics
- Type: Cargo ship
- Tonnage: 5,012 Gross register tons
- Displacement: 9,500 tons
- Length: 394 ft (120 m)
- Beam: 50 ft 3 in (15.32 m)
- Draft: 25 ft (7.6 m)
- Installed power: 3,650 indicated horsepower
- Propulsion: Steam engine, one shaft
- Speed: 13 knots
- Complement: 70

USS Carrillo (ID-1406) was a United States Navy cargo ship in commission from 1918 to 1919.

SS Carrillo was built as a commercial passenger-cargo ship in 1911 at Belfast, Ireland, by Workman, Clark and Company. The United States Shipping Board transferred her to the U.S. Navy for World War I service on 16 September 1918. The Navy assigned her the naval registry Identification Number (Id. No.) 1406 and commissioned her the same day as USS Carrillo.

Assigned to the Cruiser and Transport Force, Carrillo made four voyages to France during and after the war, carrying meats, motor trucks, aviation supplies, and artillery to American forces operating in Europe. On 15 April 1919, she returned to the United States at Staten Island, New York, from the last of these voyages.

Carrillo was decommissioned on 28 April 1919. She was returned to the Shipping Board on 8 May 1919.

The ship returned to commercial service as SS Carrillo, and for over 25 years was employed in commercial trade as part of the United Fruit Company's fleet of refrigerated cargo ships. She was laid up in the Maritime Commission's Hudson River Reserve Fleet in June 1947 and sold for scrapping in March 1948.
