= USS Celeritas =

Patrol vessel of the United States Navy

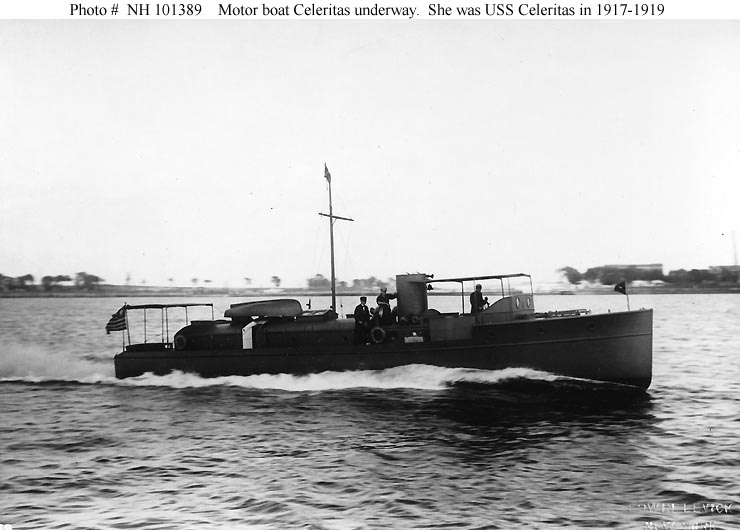
- Celeritas as a private motorboat in 1916 or 1917.

History

United States
- Name: USS Celeritas
- Namesake: Previous name retained
- Builder: Robert Jacobs, City Island, the Bronx, New York
- Completed: 1916
- Acquired: 28 May 1917
- Commissioned: 29 May 1917
- Stricken: 17 May 1919
- Fate: Sold 25 June 1919
- Notes: Operated as private motorboat Celeritas 1916–1917

General characteristics
- Type: Patrol vessel
- Length: 60 ft 6 in (18.44 m)
- Beam: 11 ft 5 in (3.48 m)
- Draft: 3 ft 3 in (0.99 m)
- Speed: 30 miles per hour

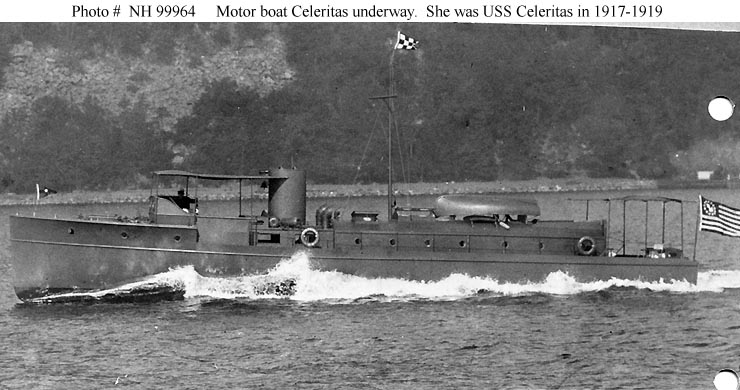
Celeritas in use as a private motorboat in 1916 or 1917, probably in the New York City area.

USS Celeritas (SP-665) was a United States Navy patrol vessel in commission from 1917 to 1919.

Designed by the firm of Swasey, Raymond, & Page, Celeritas was built as a private motorboat of the same name by Robert Jacobs at City Island in the Bronx, New York, in 1916 for David Goodrich for his use in commuting. Goodrich later sold her to R. B. Myer of New York City.

On 28 May 1917, the U.S. Navy purchased Celeritas from Myer for use as a section patrol boat during World War I. She was commissioned on 29 May 1917 as USS Celeritas (SP-665).

Assigned to the 2nd Naval District in southern New England, Celeritas carried out patrol duties for the rest of World War I.

Celeritas was stricken from the Navy Directory on 17 May 1919 and sold on 25 June 1919.
