= USS Castor =

USS Castor is a name used more than once by the U.S. Navy:

- USS Castor (1869), a single turreted monitor, was named Castor from 15 June to 10 August 1869.
- USS Castor (AKS-1), a stores ship commissioned 12 March 1941.
