= USS Cauto =

Cargo ship of the United States Navy

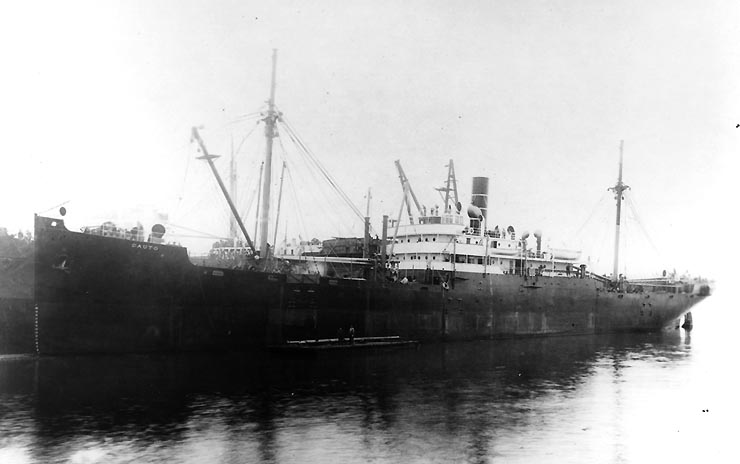
- SS Cauto on 19 June 1916, nearing completion at the Seattle Construction and Dry Dock Company, Seattle, Washington.

History

United States
- Name: USS Cauto
- Namesake: Previous name retained
- Builder: Seattle Construction and Drydock Company, Seattle, Washington
- Launched: 23 September 1916
- Completed: 9 December 1916
- Acquired: 12 July 1918
- Commissioned: 13 July 1918
- Decommissioned: 22 February 1919
- Fate: Transferred to United States Shipping Board for return to owner 1919
- Notes: In commercial service as SS Cauto 1916-1918 and 1919-1937; Wrecked 1937

General characteristics
- Type: Cargo ship
- Tonnage: 3,820 Gross register tons
- Displacement: 8,060 tons
- Length: 368 ft (112 m)
- Beam: 47 ft (14 m)
- Draft: 22 ft 6 in (6.86 m)
- Installed power: 2,500 indicated horsepower
- Propulsion: Steam engine, one shaft
- Speed: 14 knots
- Complement: 62
- Armament: 2 × 3-inch (76.2-millimeter) guns

USS Cauto (ID-1538) was a United States Navy cargo ship in commission from 1918 to 1919.

SS Cauto was a commercial cargo ship launched in 1916 and completed on 9 December 1916 at Seattle, Washington, by the Seattle Construction and Drydock Company for the New York and Cuba Mail Steamship Company of New York City. During World War I she came under the control of the United States Shipping Board, and the United States Army chartered her on 15 October 1917 to haul Army cargo during World War I. The U.S. Navy acquired Cauto from the Shipping Board for World War I service on 12 July 1918, assigned her the naval registry Identification Number (Id. No.) 1538, and commissioned as USS Cauto on 13 July 1918.

Assigned to the Naval Overseas Transportation Service, Cauto was outfitted for naval service at Philadelphia, Pennsylvania. Between 21 July 1918 and 9 February 1919, Cauto made three round-trip transatlantic voyages between the United States and France, carrying supplies for the American Expeditionary Force in France.

Cauto was decommissioned at Philadelphia on 22 February 1919 and transferred to the U.S. Shipping Board for return to the New York and Cuba Mail Steamship Company. Once again SS Cauto, she resumed civilian service, operating commercially until wrecked in 1937.
