= USS Chimo =

USS Chimo may refer to the following ships of the United States Navy:

- USS Chimo (1864), was a light-draft ironclad monitor.
- USS Chimo (AT-22), was renamed Tadousac (AT-22) on 24 February 1919.
- USS Chimo (ACM-1), acquired by the U.S Navy on 7 April 1944.
