= USS Charles P. Crawford =

Minesweeper of the United States Navy

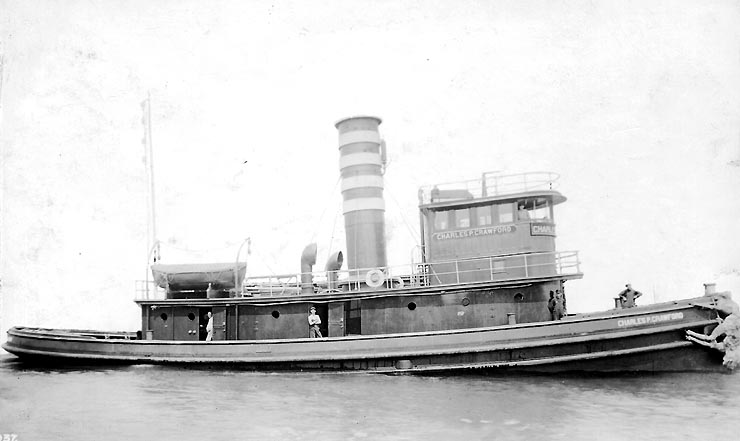
- Charles P. Crawford as a commercial tug sometime between 1915 and 1917.

History

United States
- Name: USS Charles P. Crawford
- Namesake: Previous name retained
- Builder: Staten Island Shipbuilding Company, New York, New York
- Completed: 1915
- Acquired: 8 May 1917
- Commissioned: 22 September 1917
- Fate: Returned to owners 12 August 1919
- Notes: Operated as commercial tug Charles P. Crawford 1915–1917 and from 1919

General characteristics
- Type: Minesweeper and tug
- Tonnage: 171 gross register tons
- Length: 100 ft (30 m)
- Beam: 24 ft (7.3 m)
- Draft: 10 ft 3 in (3.12 m)
- Propulsion: One double compound steam engine, 700 indicated horsepower; one 155-psi Scotch boiler; one shaft
- Speed: 9 knots
- Complement: 7
- Armament: 2 × 1-pounder guns

USS Charles P. Crawford (SP-366) was a United States Navy minesweeper and tug in commission from 1917 to 1919.

Charles P. Crawford was built as a commercial tug of the same name in 1915 by the Staten Island Shipbuilding Company in New York City, for the Erie Railroad Company, New York City. On 8 May 1917, the U.S. Navy chartered her for use as a minesweeper and tug during World War I. She was commissioned on 22 September 1917 as USS Charles P. Crawford (SP-366).

Assigned to the 3rd Naval District, Charles P. Crawford performed minesweeping, towing, and general transportation duties in the New York City area for the remainder of World War I and into 1919.

The Navy returned Charles P. Crawford to the Erie Railroad Company on 12 August 1919.
