= USS Carolinian =

Cargo ship of the United States Navy

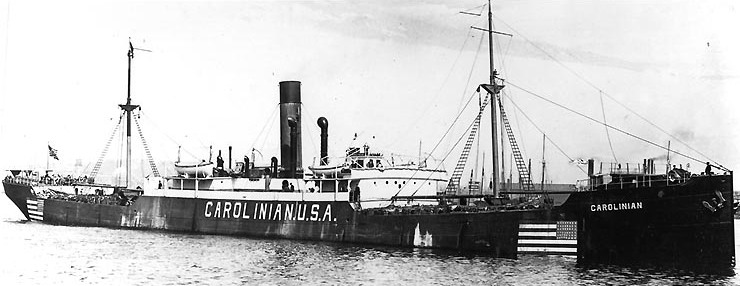
- SS Carolinian in 1917, with deck gun platforms fitted but still bearing neutrality markings

History

United States
- Name: USS Carolinian
- Namesake: A native of the Carolinas (previous name retained)
- Builder: Furness-Withy Company, West Hartlepool, England
- Launched: 3 September 1906
- Completed: 1906
- Acquired: 5 October 1918
- Commissioned: 5 October 1918
- Decommissioned: 22 March 1919
- Fate: Transferred to United States Shipping Board 22 March 1919 for return to owner
- Notes: Served as commercial cargo ship SS Harley, SS Southerner, and SS Carolinian 1906-1918 and as SS Carolinian from 1919

General characteristics
- Type: Cargo ship
- Tonnage: 4,170 Gross register tons
- Beam: 50 ft 2 in (15.29 m)
- Draft: 23 ft 11 in (7.29 m)
- Installed power: 1,600 indicated horsepower
- Propulsion: Steam engine, one shaft
- Speed: 9 knots
- Complement: 35
- Armament: 2 × 4-inch (102-millimeter) guns

USS Carolinian (ID-1445) was a cargo ship that served in the United States Navy from 1918 to 1919.

Carolinian was built as a commercial cargo ship in 1906 at West Hartlepool, England, by the Furness-Withy Company. She operated under the names SS Harley and SS Southerner. By the time the United States entered World War I in 1917, she was named SS Carolinian and was the property of the Garland Steamship Company of New York City. For most of the war, she operated under a United States Army charter. The U.S. Navy acquired her for World War I service on 5 October 1918, assigned her the naval registry Identification Number (Id. No.) 1445, and commissioned her the same day as USS Carolinian.

Carolinian operated in European waters, based at Cardiff, Wales, carrying coal from Cardiff and other English ports to France for use by U.S. Army transports coaling at French ports from her commissioning until 8 February 1919.

On 8 February 1919, Carolinian departed for Newport News, Virginia, with a U.S. Army cargo, and, after stopping in the Azores for voyage repairs, arrived at Baltimore, Maryland, on 12 March 1919 to discharge her cargo and start inactivation.

Carolinian was decommissioned on 22 March 1919 and transferred to the United States Shipping Board the same day for return to the Garland Steamship Company.
