= USS Columbine =

Two ships of the United States Navy have been named Columbine after Columbine, the flowering herb.

- USS Columbine (1862), a side wheel tug, was built in New York during 1850 as the A. H. Schultz and purchased by the Navy 12 December 1862.
- USS Columbine (1917), a lighthouse tender, served in the Navy from 11 April 1917 to 1 July 1919, and was assigned to the 14th and 5th Naval Districts.
