= USS Crossbill =

Two ships of the United States Navy have been named Crossbill, after the crossbill, a finch whose curved mandibles cross each other.

- USS Crossbill (AMc-9), acquired by the Navy on 31 October 1940.
- USS Crossbill (AMS-45), laid down, 23 August 1941.
