= USCGC Chincoteague (1919) =

United States Coast Guard ship

History

United States
- Name: USCGC Chincoteague
- Namesake: Chincoteague Bay in Maryland and Virginia
- Launched: 1919
- Completed: 1919
- Acquired: 14 November 1919
- Decommissioned: 1 January 1923
- Fate: Sold 20 March 1925

General characteristics
- Displacement: 215 tons
- Length: 88 ft (27 m)
- Beam: 20 ft (6.1 m)
- Draft: 8 ft 9 in (2.67 m)
- Propulsion: Steam: 18-inch (46-centimeter diameter, 24-inch (61-centimeter) stroke
- Complement: 10 (1 officer, 9 enlisted personnel)
- Armament: 2 x 1-pounder guns

For United States Navy ships of the name, see USS Chincoteague.

The first USCGC Chincoteague was a United States Coast Guard armed tug in service from 1919 to 1923.

Chincoteague was built at Annapolis, Maryland, as part of a class of United States Navy tugs intended for service in World War I. Completed after the end of hostilities, she was turned over to the Coast Guard on 14 November 1919.

Chincoteague was first based at Norfolk, Virginia, then moved to Baltimore, Maryland. She was decommissioned at Baltimore on 1 January 1923 and sold on 20 March 1925.
