= USS Contocook =

USS Contocook, and alternatively spelled Contoocook may refer to:

- USS Contoocook (1864), was a screw sloop launched in 1864; name changed to Albany in 1869 and sold in 1872
- USS Contocook (AT-36), was a fleet tug launched in 1920 and sold in 1934
- Contoocook was originally intended as a fleet oiler for the U.S. Navy but her acquisition was canceled in 1945; she later served as USNS Mission San Francisco (T-AO-123)
