= USS Cozy =

Patrol vessel of the United States Navy

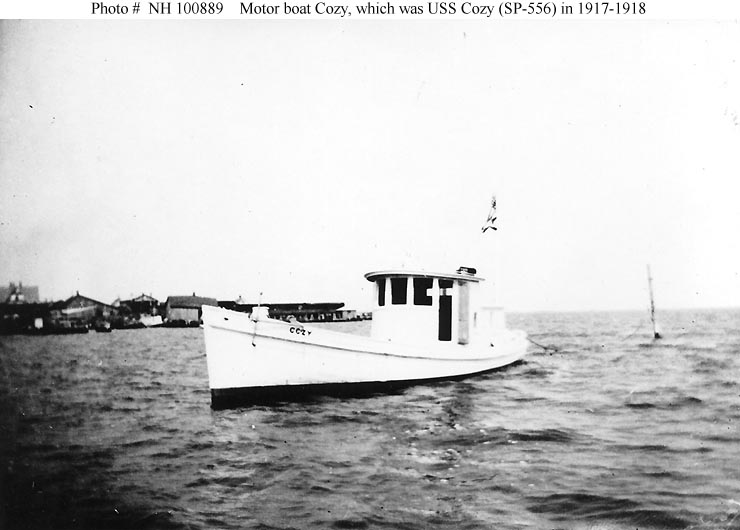
- Cozy as a civilian motorboat prior to her United States Navy service.

History

United States
- Name: USS Cozy
- Namesake: Previous name retained
- Builder: L. P. Trader
- Acquired: 15 November 1917
- Commissioned: 30 November 1917
- Decommissioned: December 1918
- Fate: Returned to owner 20 December 1918
- Notes: Operated as civilian motorboat Cozy until November 1917 and from December 1918

General characteristics
- Type: Patrol vessel
- Tonnage: 12 gross register tons
- Length: 35 ft (11 m) or 50 ft (15 m)
- Beam: 8 ft 6 in (2.59 m)
- Draft: 3 ft (0.91 m)
- Speed: 8 knots
- Complement: 6
- Armament: 1 × machine gun; 1 × Y-gun

USS Cozy (SP-556) was a United States Navy patrol vessel in commission from 1917 to 1918.

Cozy was built as a wooden-hulled civilian working motorboat of the same name by L. P. Trader. On 15 November 1917, the U.S. Navy chartered her from her owner, Harry N. Collins of Franklin City, Virginia, for use as a section patrol vessel during World War I. She was commissioned as USS Cozy (SP-556) on 30 November 1917.

Assigned to the 5th Naval District, Cozy served on patrol duties for the rest of World War I.

Cozy was decommissioned in December 1918 and returned to Collins on 20 December 1918.
