= SS Cape Girardeau =

A number of steamships have been named Cape Girardeau, including:

- SS Cape Girardeau (1943)
- SS Cape Girardeau (AK-2039)
