= USS Clark =

USS Clark has been the name of more than one United States Navy ship, and may refer to:

- USS Clark (DD-361), a destroyer in commission from 1936 to 1945
- USS Clark (FFG-11), a frigate in commission from 1980 to 2000

== See also ==
- USS James H. Clark (SP-759), a tug in commission from 1917 to 1920
