= USS Charles Ausburn =

USS Charles Ausburn may refer to:

- USS Charles Ausburn (DD-294), a Clemson-class destroyer, commissioned in 1920 and decommissioned in 1930.
- USS Charles Ausburne (DD-570), a Fletcher-class destroyer, commissioned in 1942 and decommissioned in 1946. She was transferred to the German Navy in 1960, as Z-6 until scrapped in 1968.
