= USS Chawasha (ATF-151) =

History

United States
- Name: USS Chawasha
- Builder: Charleston Shipbuilding & Dry Dock Co.
- Laid down: April 1944
- Launched: 15 September 1944
- Commissioned: 6 February 1945
- Decommissioned: 30 September 1946
- Stricken: 1 July 1963
- Fate: Sunk as a target

General characteristics
- Class & type: Achomawi class fleet ocean tug
- Displacement: 1,205 long tons (1,224 t) light; 1,646 long tons (1,672 t) full
- Length: 205 ft (62 m)
- Beam: 38 ft 6 in (11.73 m)
- Draft: 15 ft 4 in (4.67 m)
- Propulsion: Diesel-electric; 4 × General Motors 12-278A diesel main engines driving 4 × General Electric generators and 3 × General Motors 3-268A auxiliary services engines, single screw
- Speed: 16 knots (18 mph; 30 km/h)
- Complement: 8 officers, 68 enlisted men
- Armament: 1 × 3"/50 caliber gun; 2 × 40 mm guns; 2 × 20 mm guns

USS Chawasha (ATF-151) was an Achomawi class fleet ocean tug built for the United States Navy during World War II. She was the only U.S. Naval vessel to bear the name.

Chawasha was laid down in April 1944 by the Charleston Shipbuilding and Dry Dock Company of Charleston, South Carolina; launched on 15 September 1944; sponsored by Mrs. R.H. Grantham; and commissioned at Charleston Navy Yard on 6 February 1945.

== Service history ==
Following shakedown training in Chesapeake Bay, Chawasha sailed to Philadelphia, departing 24 March on a long and arduous towing job, bringing two dump scows through the Panama Canal and across the Pacific to Samar, P.I., which she reached 16 June. Her stay was brief, departing almost immediately for Ulithi Atoll to join logistic support group TG 30.8, arriving 27 June. Chawasha then spent the next two months assisting the Third Fleet in its series of pounding raids against the Japanese homeland. On 8 July, USS Sioux broke down at sea, and Chawasha towed her to Saipan. The fleet tug rejoined TG 30.8 on 15 July for replenishment and courier service, evading a severe typhoon from 10–15 August. Chawasha was at sea off the Japanese coast when hostilities ended, and put into Tokyo Bay 5 September. Over the next four months she cleared wrecked Japanese shipping from the dock areas at Yokosuka, Yokohama, Wakayama, and Kobe.

Chawasha continued to aid occupation activities in the Far East until 19 February 1946, when she cleared Kobe for Samar. Here, she took ARD-18 in tow for Pearl Harbor, where she assumed another tow for Balboa. Sailing singly, she arrived in San Diego on 4 June, and entered preinactivation availability and overhaul. Chawasha was placed out of commission in reserve at San Pedro on 30 September 1946.

Chawasha was transferred to the Suisun Bay Reserve Fleet on 25 October 1962 and was stricken from the Naval Vessel Register on 1 July 1963. She remained in Suisun Bay until 14 August 1978, when she was returned to the navy to be used as a target in a fleet training exercise. In November 1978, she was towed to Subic Bay, Philippines, along with the former USS Sciota (ATA-205), where both were to be stored prior to their sinking. The actual date of her sinking is unknown, but it is probable that Chawasha was disposed of in a fleet training exercise in late 1978 or early 1979.

Chawasha received one battle star for World War II service.
