= USS Coronet =

Patrol vessel of the United States Navy

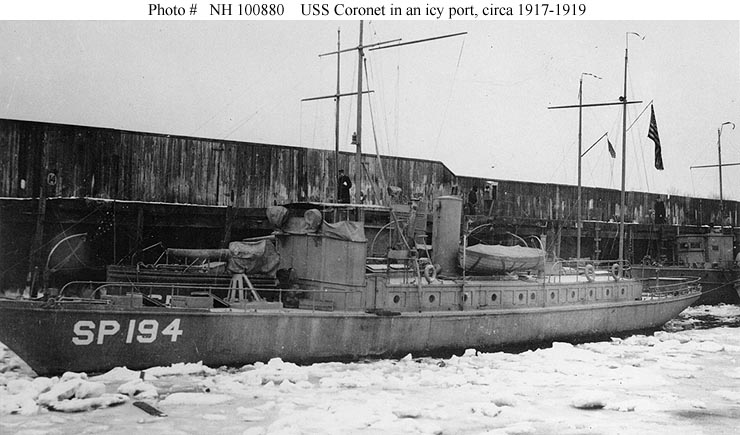
- USS Coronet in an icy port sometime between 1917 and 1919.

History

United States
- Name: USS Coronet
- Namesake: Previous name retained
- Completed: 1905
- Acquired: 20 July 1917
- Commissioned: 24 September 1917
- Stricken: 5 August 1919
- Fate: Sold 5 August 1919
- Notes: Operated as private motorboat Coronet 1905–1917

General characteristics
- Type: Patrol vessel
- Length: 90 ft (27 m)
- Beam: 14 ft (4.3 m)
- Draft: 4 ft 1 in (1.24 m)
- Speed: 13 knots
- Complement: 12
- Armament: 1 × 3-pounder gun

USS Coronet (SP-194) was an armed motorboat that served in the United States Navy as a patrol vessel from 1917 to 1919.

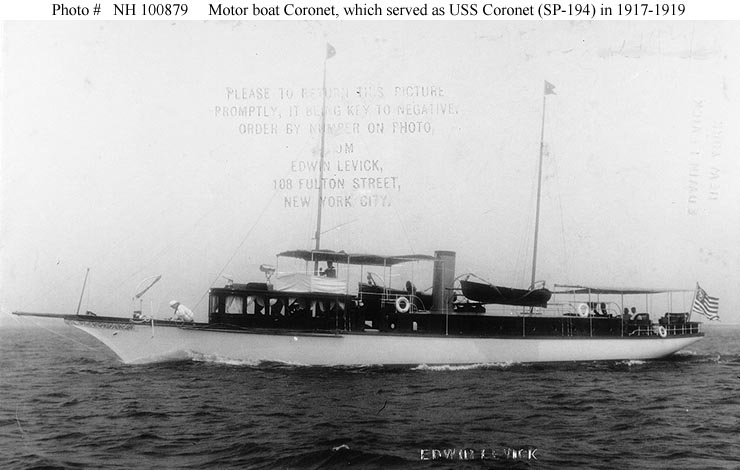
Coronet as a private motorboat sometime between 1905 and 1917.

Coronet was built as a civilian motorboat in 1905 at Morris Heights, New York. The U.S. Navy acquired her on 20 July 1917 for use as a patrol boat during World War I. She was commissioned on 24 September 1917 as USS Coronet (SP-194).

Coronet was assigned to the 3rd Naval District, where she performed patrol duty for the remainder of World War I.

On 5 August 1919, Coronet was stricken from the Navy Directory and sold.
