= USS Chatterer =

USS Chatterer is a name used more than once by the U.S. Navy:

- USS Chatterer (AMc-16), a coastal minesweeper placed in service on 20 November 1940.
- USS Chatterer (AMS-40), a minesweeper commissioned as USS YMS-415, 1 October 1944.
