= USS Chimango =

USS Chimango is a name used more than once by the U.S. Navy:

- USS Chimango (AMc-42), a coastal minesweeper commissioned 3 June 1941
- USS Chimango (AMCU-20), originally LCI(L)-703; renamed and reclassified 7 March 1952
