= USS Caliph =

Patrol vessel of the United States Navy

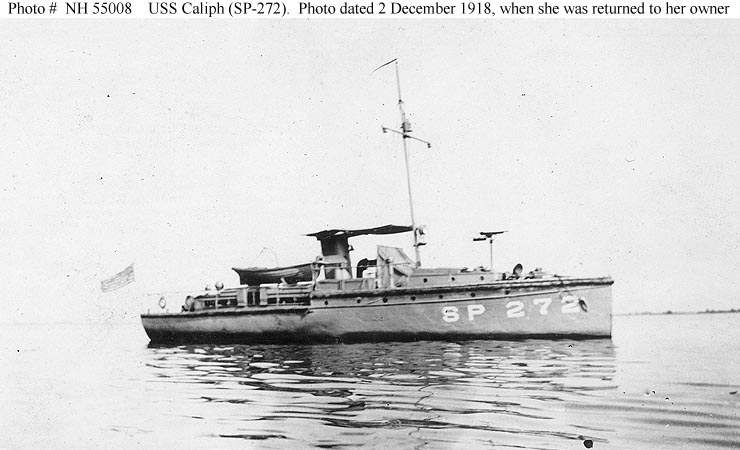
- USS Caliph on 2 December 1918, the day she was decommissioned and returned to her owner.

History

United States
- Name: USS Caliph
- Namesake: Previous name retained
- Builder: Matthews Yacht Building Company
- Completed: 1910
- Acquired: May 1917
- Commissioned: ca. May 1917
- Decommissioned: December 1917
- Recommissioned: 1 April 1918
- Decommissioned: 2 December 1918
- Fate: Returned to owner 2 December 1918
- Notes: Operated as civilian motorboat Caliph 1910-1917 and from December 1918

General characteristics
- Type: Patrol vessel
- Length: 60 ft (18 m)

USS Caliph (SP-272) was a United States Navy patrol vessel in commission in 1917 and again in 1918. Caliph is derived from the word al-khalifah, Arabic word for the leader.

Caliph was built for Commodore Martin E. Brigham of Philadelphia in 1910 by the J.H. Mathis Yacht Building Company of Camden, New Jersey. The Mathis yard was located at Point and Erie Streets in Camden.

Caliph was launched 20 April 1910 and was christened by Mrs. Imogene Coultes, the daughter of Commodore Brigham.

Caliph was designed by Bowes and Watts and competed in that year's Philadelphia to Havana races and placed second on the outbound journey although she had arrived first in time. On the return journey Caliph came in first. The U.S. Navy leased her in May 1917 for World War I service as a patrol vessel. She was commissioned as USS Caliph (SP-272).

Throughout her life Caliph had a Bureau of Commerce number 207413.

Caliph was equipped with a six-cylinder Hall 36 horsepower gas engine that was soon changed to a 37-horsepower Kent four cylinder engine in 1911.

Placed in service in the 4th Naval District—which was responsible for the Pennsylvania, Delaware, and southern New Jersey area -- Caliph performed section patrol duty until December 1917, when she was laid up for the winter at Washington, D.C.

Caliph was recommissioned on 1 April 1918 and assigned to duty with the District Communication Superintendent at Marcus Hook, Pennsylvania. She resumed her patrol duties.

Caliph was decommissioned on 2 December 1918 and returned to her owners.

In 1922, Caliph was sold to Captain Robert John Luedemann of 47 Beaumont Street, Brooklyn, New York and subsequently was operated as a charter boat based in Miami, Florida until at least 1934.
