= USS Carolina (1906) =

American naval ship

History

United States
- Name: Carolina
- Launched: 1906
- Fate: Sold, 3 August 1922

General characteristics
- Type: Harbor launch
- Length: 57 ft 6 in (17.53 m)
- Beam: 13 ft 1 in (3.99 m)

USS Carolina was a 57 ft 6 in (17.53 m) wooden-hulled harbor launch built at Morehead City, North Carolina in 1906 for the United States Coast Guard, and stationed at Elizabeth City, North Carolina for her entire career.

In accordance with Federal legislation of 28 January 1915, this ship was automatically transferred to the United States Navy upon the United States entry into World War I in April 1917. There is no record of her ever having performed active duty, and she was returned to the Coast Guard by an order of 28 August 1919.

She was sold for $1,025 on 3 August 1922.
