= USS Carolita =

Patrol vessel of the United States Navy

History

United States
- Name: Carolita
- Namesake: Original name retained
- Builder: Germaniawerft, Kiel
- Launched: 1923
- Acquired: by purchase, 1 April 1942
- Commissioned: 6 November 1942
- Decommissioned: 28 February 1944
- Fate: Used as a target ship

General characteristics
- Type: Patrol boat
- Displacement: 236 long tons (240 t)
- Length: 133 ft 5 in (40.67 m)
- Beam: 23 ft (7.0 m)
- Draft: 10 ft (3.0 m)
- Speed: 14 knots (26 km/h; 16 mph)
- Armament: 1 × 3 in (76 mm) gun

USS Carolita (PYC-38) was a patrol boat in the United States Navy.

Carolita was built in 1923 as Ripple by Germaniawerft, Kiel, Germany; purchased by the Navy on 1 April 1942 from Herman G. Buckley, of Chicago, Illinois; and commissioned on 6 November 1942.

== World War II operations ==
Arriving at Boston, Massachusetts, on 16 December 1942, Carolita, operated there until 3 August 1943 when she departed for Key West, Florida, via Norfolk, Virginia, and repairs at Miami, Florida.

== Sound School assignment ==
She served with the Sound School from 8 September 1943, helping to train men in the techniques of anti-submarine warfare.

== Decommissioning ==
Carolita was decommissioned on 28 February 1944 and used as a target.
