= USS Carp =

Two submarines of the United States Navy have been named USS Carp:

- USS Carp (SS-20)
- USS Carp (SS-338)
