= USS Crow =

Two ships of the United States Navy have been named Crow:

- USS Crow (AMc-20)
- USS Crow (AMS-7)

== See also ==
- USS Howard D. Crow (DE-252)
