= USS Cotinga =

Two ships of the United States Navy have been named Cotinga, after the Cotinga, a passerine bird of South and Central America.

- USS Cotinga (AMc-43), was launched 25 March 1941.
- USS Cotinga (AMCU-22), the former LCI(L)-776; renamed and reclassified AMCU-22 on 7 March 1952.
