= Canonchet (YTB-823) =

Tugboat of the United States Navy

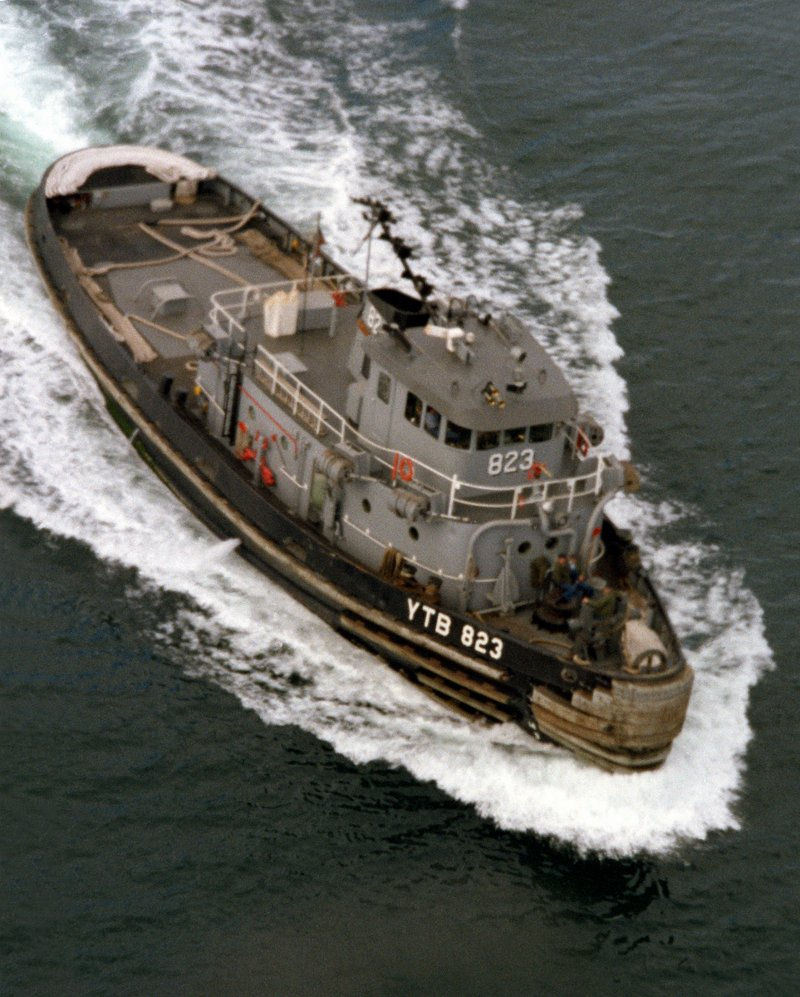
- Aerial starboard bow view of Canonchet (YTB-823) underway at San Diego, 1 May 1983.

History

United States
- Awarded: 9 August 1971
- Builder: Marinette Marine, Marinette, Wisconsin
- Laid down: 7 February 1973
- Launched: 10 July 1973
- Acquired: 23 September 1973
- Out of service: 27 October 2021
- Stricken: 27 October 2021
- Identification: MMSI number: 369970521
- Status: Stricken to be disposed of

General characteristics
- Class & type: Natick-class large harbor tug
- Displacement: 286 long tons (291 t) (light); 346 long tons (352 t) (full)
- Length: 108 ft (33 m)
- Beam: 31 ft (9.4 m)
- Draft: 14 ft (4.3 m)
- Speed: 12 knots (14 mph; 22 km/h)
- Complement: 12
- Armament: None

Canonchet (YTB-823) was a United States Navy Natick-class large harbor tug.

== Construction ==
The contract for Canonchet was awarded 9 August 1971. She was laid down on 7 February 1973 at Marinette, Wisconsin, by Marinette Marine and launched 10 July 1973.

== Nomenclature ==
Canonchet was named for Canonchet (d. 1676) a sachem of the Narragansett Tribe in Rhode Island.

== Operational history ==
Canonchet was delivered to the navy on 23 September 1973. The tug served at Naval Station San Diego, California into 1993. Sometime after 1993, she was transferred to Naval Region Northwest. She was placed out of service on 27 October 2021.
