= USS Challenge =

USS Challenge is a name used more than once by the U.S. Navy:

- USS Challenge (No. 1015), a tugboat built in 1889 by J. H. Dialogue and Sons, Camden, New Jersey.
- USS Challenge (ATA-201), a tugboat delivered to the Navy, 22 November 1944.
