= USS Charles R. Ware =

USS Charles R. Ware has been the name of more than one United States Navy ship, and may refer to:

- USS Charles R. Ware (DE-547), a destroyer escort cancelled in 1944
- USS Charles R. Ware (DD-865), a destroyer in commission from 1945 to 1974
