= USS Comber =

USS Comber has been the name of more than one United States Navy ship, and may refer to:

- USS Comber (SP-344), a minesweeper in commission from 1917 to 1919
- USS Comber (SS-527), a proposed Tench-class submarine cancelled in 1944 before construction could begin
