= USS Crocus =

Two ships of the United States Navy have been named Crocus after the spring flower of the iris family.

- USS Crocus (1862), was a screw steamer, was built in 1862.
- USS Crocus (WAGL-210) was a lighthouse tender transferred to the Navy at the beginning of World War I.
