= USS Charles P. Kuper =

Tugboat of the United States Navy

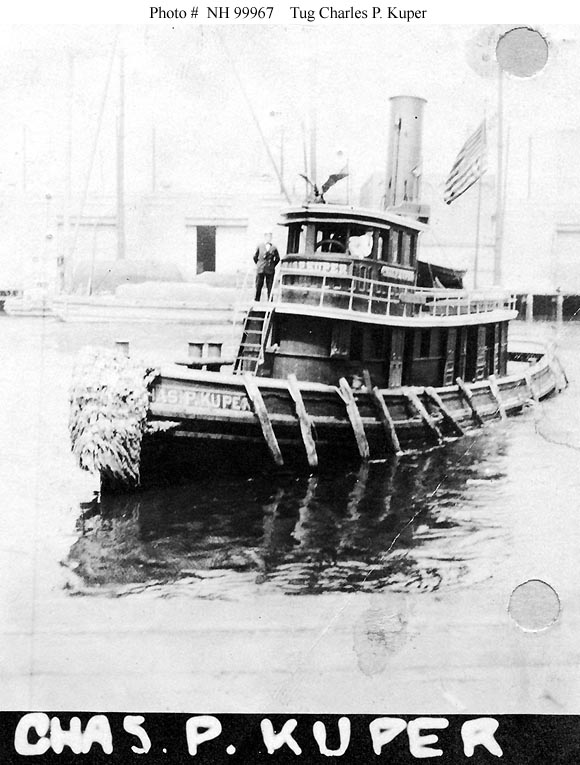
- Charles P. Kuper ca. 1917, probably in New York Harbor, either just before or just after she entered United States Navy service as USS Charles P. Kuper (SP-1235).

History

United States
- Name: USS Charles P. Kuper
- Namesake: Previous name retained
- Builder: Browne, Tottenville, Staten Island, New York
- Completed: 1892
- Acquired: August 1917
- In service: 1917
- Fate: Returned to owner 21 July 1919
- Notes: Operated as commercial tug C. Offerman and Charles P. Kuper 1892-1917 and Charles P. Kuper from 1919

General characteristics
- Type: Tug
- Tonnage: 51 Gross register tons
- Length: 62 ft 5 in (19.02 m)
- Beam: 17 ft 9 in (5.41 m)
- Draft: 8 ft (2.4 m)
- Propulsion: Steam engine, one shaft
- Complement: 4
- Armament: None

USS Charles P. Kuper (SP-1235) was a United States Navy tug in service from 1917 to 1919.

Charles P. Kuper was built as the commercial tug C. Offerman in 1892 by Browne at Tottenville on Staten Island, New York. On 29 November 1906, she was sold to the Simmons Lighterage Company of New York City, which renamed her Charles P. Kuper.

In August 1917, the U.S. Navy chartered Charles P. Kuper from her owner, the Simmons Transportation Company of New York City for use during World War I. She entered service as USS Charles P. Kuper (SP-1235) in 1917.

Assigned to the 3rd Naval District and based at New York City, Charles P. Kuper served in New York Harbor under the control of the Supply Department for the rest of World War I and into 1919.

The Navy returned Charles P. Kuper to Simmons Transportation on 21 July 1919.
