= USS Chicopee =

USS Chicopee is the name of two United States Navy ships:

- USS Chicopee (1863), a large steamer used from 1864 until 1866
- USS Chicopee (AO-34), an oil tanker in service from 1942 until 1946
