= USS Charles Phelps =

Collier of the United States Navy

History

United States
- Launched: 1848
- Acquired: 24 June 1861
- Commissioned: 1861
- Decommissioned: 1865
- Fate: Sold, 25 October 1865

General characteristics
- Displacement: 363 tons
- Length: 110 ft (34 m)
- Beam: 27 ft 4 in (8.33 m)
- Draft: 18 ft (5.5 m)
- Complement: 23
- Armament: one 32-pounder smoothbore gun

USS Charles Phelps was a ship acquired by the Union Navy during the American Civil War. She was used by the Navy as an auxiliary support vessel, delivering coal to Union steamers blockading Confederate ports.

== Service history ==
Charles Phelps was built in 1848 at New London, Connecticut, as a whaler; purchased at New Bedford, Massachusetts, 24 June 1861; and commissioned later in the year, Acting Master W. F. North in command. Assigned as a coal supply ship for the North Atlantic Blockading Squadron, Charles Phelps served in Hampton Roads, Virginia, throughout the Civil War, resupplying ships enforcing the Union blockade in the area. Charles Phelps was sold at New York City 25 October 1865.
