= USS Claxton =

Two United States Navy destroyers have been named in honor of Thomas Claxton.

- The first USS Claxton (DD-140) was originally commissioned in 1918, and ultimately saw service as HMS Salisbury (I52).
- The second USS Claxton (DD-571) served during World War II.
