= USS Clarinda =

Patrol vessel of the United States Navy

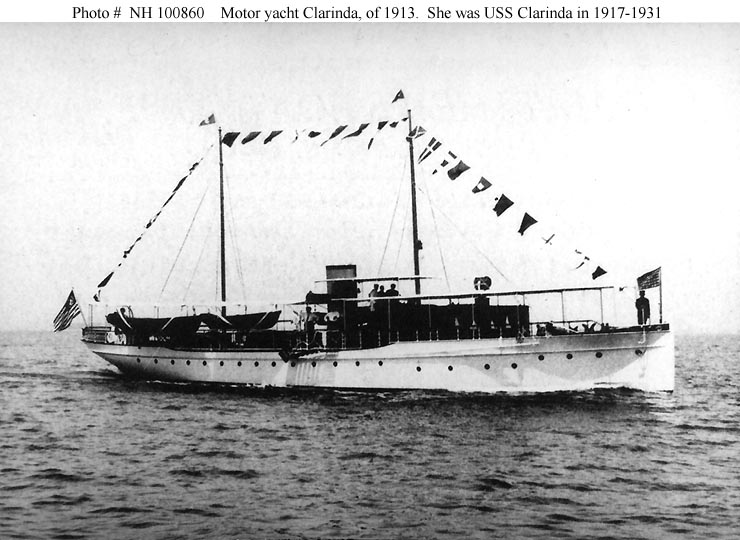
- Clarinda as a civilian yacht, probably shortly after her 1913 completion.

History

United States
- Name: USS Clarinda
- Namesake: Previous name retained
- Builder: Matthews Boat Company, Port Clinton, Ohio
- Completed: 1913
- Acquired: 5 July 1917
- Commissioned: 21 November 1917
- Decommissioned: 26 December 1930
- Reclassified: From section patrol craft (SP-185) to district patrol craft (YP-185) in 1920
- Fate: Sold 1 June 1931
- Notes: Operated as civilian motor yacht Clarinda 1913–1917

General characteristics
- Type: Patrol vessel
- Tonnage: 76 Gross register tons
- Length: 98 ft (30 m)
- Beam: 17 ft 2 in (5.23 m)
- Draft: 5 ft 6 in (1.68 m)
- Propulsion: Internal combustion engine, two shafts
- Speed: 14 knots
- Armament: 1 × 3-pounder guns; 1 × depth charge projector

USS Clarinda (SP-185), later YP-185, was an armed yacht that served in the United States Navy as a patrol vessel from 1917 to 1930.

Clarinda was built in 1913 by the Matthews Boat Company at Port Clinton, Ohio, as a civilian twin-screw motor yacht of the same name. The U.S. Navy purchased her on 5 July 1917 for World War I service as a patrol vessel. She was commissioned as USS Clarinda (SP-185) on 21 November 1917.

Assigned to the 6th Naval District, Clarinda was based at Charleston, South Carolina, for patrol and pilot duty for the duration of World War I. Retained in the Navy after the war, she continued service as a patrol vessel in the 6th Naval District until the end of 1930. Her classification was changed from section patrol craft (SP-185) to district patrol craft (YP-185) in 1920.

Clarinda was decommissioned at the Charleston Navy Yard at Charleston on 26 December 1930 and sold on 1 June 1931.
