= USS Catskill =

Two ships of the United States Navy have been named Catskill after the Catskill Mountains in New York.

- USS Catskill (1862), a single-turreted monitor, was launched 16 December 1862 by the Continental Iron Works.
- USS Catskill (LSV-1), was reclassified to CM-6 on 1 May 1943 and to LSV-1 on 21 April 1944 and to MCS-1, 18 October 1956.
