= USS Courser (AMc-32) =

Minesweeper of the United States Navy

History

United States
- Ordered: as Nancy Rose
- Laid down: date unknown
- Launched: date unknown
- Acquired: date unknown
- In service: 1941
- Out of service: 1947
- Stricken: date unknown
- Fate: fate unknown

General characteristics
- Displacement: est. 200 tons
- Length: est. 100 ft (30 m)
- Beam: est. 22 ft (6.7 m)
- Draught: est. 8 ft (2.4 m)
- Speed: est. 10.0 knots (19 km/h)
- Complement: est. 17

USS Courser (AMc-32) was a coastal minesweeper acquired by the U.S. Navy for the dangerous task of removing mines from minefields laid in the water to prevent ships from passing. The first ship to be named Courser by the Navy, AMc-32 served in an "in service" status from 1941 to 1947.
