= USS Caroline =

US Navy patrol vessel

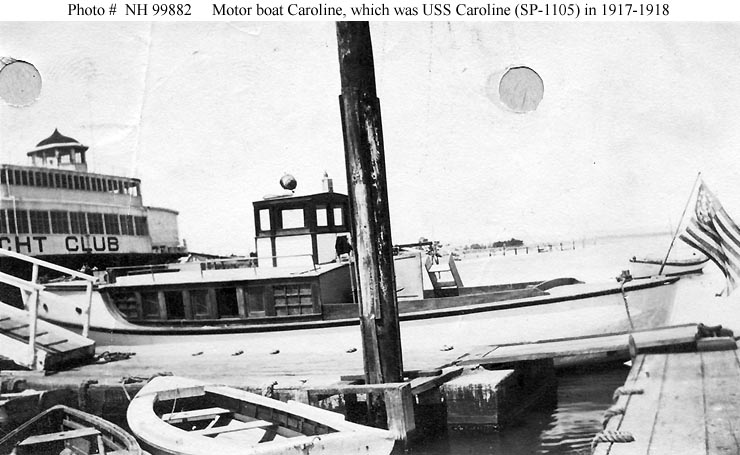
- Caroline as a private motorboat sometime between 1912 and 1917.

History

United States
- Name: USS Caroline
- Namesake: Previous name retained
- Completed: 1912
- Acquired: 17 May 1917
- Commissioned: 1917
- Fate: Returned to owner 23 December 1918
- Notes: Operated as civilian motorboat Caroline 1912-1917 and from 1918

General characteristics
- Type: Patrol vessel
- Length: 42 ft 6 in (12.95 m)
- Beam: 10 ft (3.0 m)
- Draft: 4 ft (1.2 m)
- Speed: 8 knots
- Complement: 7
- Armament: 2 × machine guns

USS Caroline (SP-1105) was a United States Navy patrol vessel in commission from 1917 to 1918.

Caroline was built as a private motorboat of the same name in 1912. On 17 May 1917, the U.S. Navy acquired her under a free lease from her owner, R. Brackenbury of San Diego, California, for use as a section patrol boat during World War I. She was commissioned as USS Caroline (SP-1105).

Assigned to the 12th Naval District, Caroline served on harbor patrol and guard ship duty at San Diego through the end of World War I.

The Navy returned Caroline to Brackenbury on 23 December 1918.
