= USS Carmita =

Two ships of the United States Navy have been named Carmita.

- USS Carmita (1862), a schooner, was captured by USS Magnolia on 27 December 1862.
- USS Carmita (IX-152), formerly Slate, was acquired by the Navy and placed in service on 11 May 1944.
