= USS Caspian (ID-1380) =

Caspian
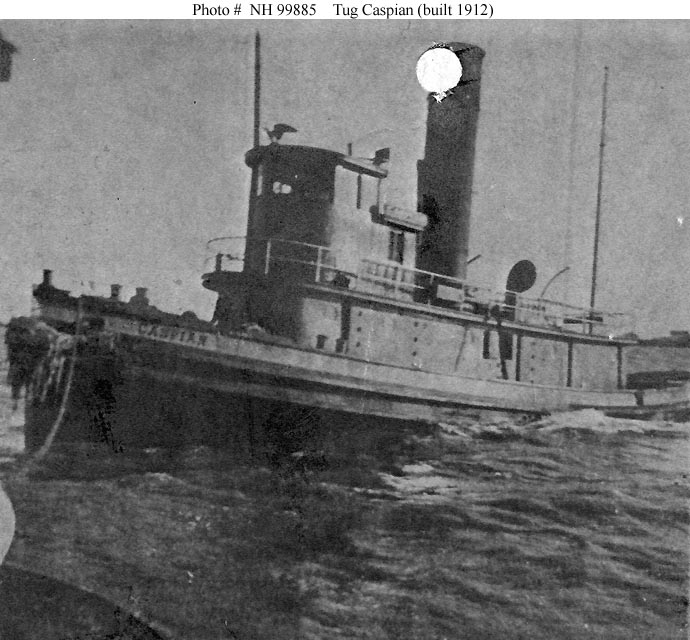
- SS Caspian sometime between 1912 and 1917.

History

United States
- Owner: P. F. Martin
- Builder: John Dialogue and Son, Camden, New Jersey
- Completed: 1912
- Notes: Registered as ID-1380 for potential U.S. Navy service

General characteristics
- Type: Tug
- Displacement: 125 tons
- Length: 80 ft 6 in (24.54 m)
- Beam: 21 ft 6 in (6.55 m)
- Draft: 10 ft 2 in (3.10 m)
- Installed power: 500 ihp (370 kW) steam engine
- Propulsion: Single screw
- Crew: 8

USS Caspian (ID-1380) was the proposed name and hull classification for a tug that never actually served in the United States Navy.

SS Caspian was a steel-hulled commercial tug built in 1912 by John Dialogue and Son at Camden, New Jersey. In early March 1918, the Commandant of the US Navy's 4th Naval District ordered that she be taken over for World War I service. The Navy assigned her the hull classification ID-1380 in anticipation of commissioning her as USS Caspian. However, the Navy never took possession of her, and she remained in civilian service with her owner, P. F. Martin of Philadelphia, Pennsylvania.
