= USS Chichota =

Patrol vessel of the United States Navy

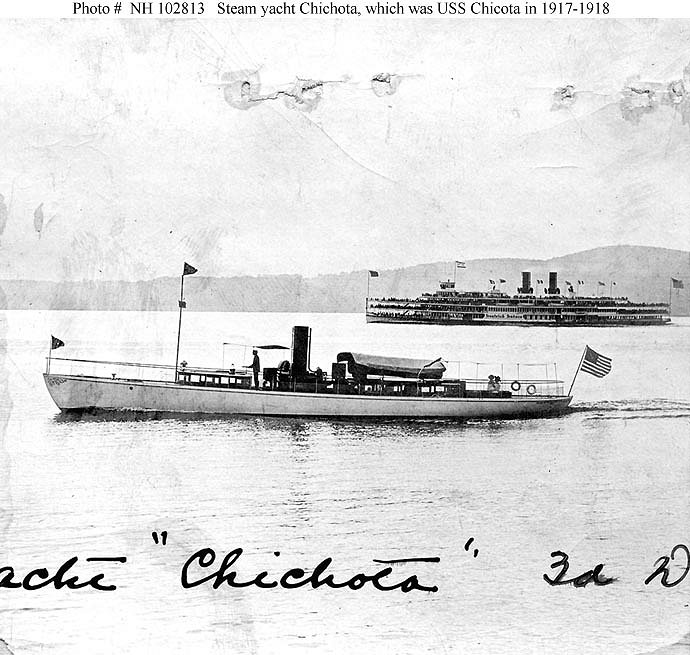
- Chichota in private use on the Hudson River prior to her U.S. Navy service.

History

United States
- Name: USS Chichota
- Namesake: Previous name retained
- Builder: Herreshoff Manufacturing Company, Bristol, Rhode Island
- Completed: 1901
- Acquired: 1 May 1917
- Commissioned: 5 June 1917
- Decommissioned: 21 December 1918
- Fate: Returned to owner
- Notes: In use as private yacht Niagara III and Chichota 1901–1917 and Chichota from December 1918

General characteristics
- Type: Patrol vessel
- Tonnage: 27 Gross register tons
- Length: 81 ft (25 m)
- Propulsion: Steam engine

USS Chichota (SP-65) was an armed yacht that served in the United States Navy as a patrol vessel from 1917 to 1918.

Chichota was built as the private steam yacht Niagara III in 1901 by Herreshoff Manufacturing Company at Bristol, Rhode Island. She had been renamed Chichota by the time the U.S. Navy acquired her for World War I service as a patrol vessel under a free lease from her owner, Edwin Gould of New York City, on 1 May 1917. The Navy commissioned her on 5 June 1917 as USS Chichota (SP-65).

Chichota was assigned to the 3rd Naval District, where she performed submarine net patrol duty in the New York Harbor area. She was transferred for a brief time to the Chesapeake Bay area, but returned to New York early in 1918.

Chichota was decommissioned on 21 December 1918 and returned to her owner.
