= USS Chewink =

USS Chewink is a name the U.S. Navy has used more than once in naming its warships:

- USS Chewink (AM-39), launched 21 December 1918 by Todd Shipyard Corp., New York City.
- USS Chewink (AMCU-19), originally LCI(L)-701; renamed and reclassified on 7 March 1952.
