= USS Canonicus (YT-187) =

Tugboat of the United States Navy

History

United States
- Name: USS Canonicus
- Namesake: Canonicus (c. 1565-1647), a Native American chief of the Narragansett
- Launched: 1941
- Acquired: 1 May 1941
- Decommissioned: 30 April 1947
- In service: 3 June 1941
- Fate: Transferred to the Maritime Commission for disposal 30 April 1947

General characteristics
- Type: Harbor tug
- Displacement: 133 tons
- Length: 93 ft (28 m)
- Beam: 22 ft (6.7 m)
- Propulsion: Diesel-electric 750 hp (560 kW), single propeller

The third USS Canonicus (YT-187) was a United States Navy harbor tug which entered service in 1941 and was discarded in 1947.

It was built in Beaumont, Texas as the Thomas E. Moran for the Moran Towing Co., and purchased from them by the navy on 1 May 1941. Renamed Canonicus, it was placed in service on 3 June 1941. It served in the 1st Naval District and 5th Naval District.

Canonicus was transferred to the Maritime Commission for disposal on 30 April 1947, and was repurchased by Moran Towing, becoming the Mary Moran. It ultimate fate is unknown.
