= USS Chanticleer (SP-663) =

Patrol vessel of the United States Navy

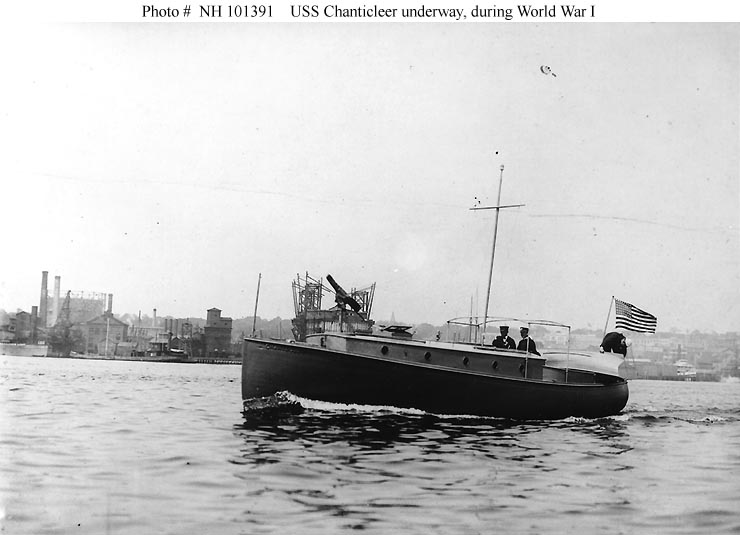
- USS Chanticleer (SP-663) underway during World War I.

History

United States
- Name: USS Chanticleer
- Namesake: Previous name retained
- Builder: Wilton C. Crosby
- Acquired: 21 May 1917
- Commissioned: 22 May 1917
- Fate: Returned to owner 25 November 1918
- Notes: Operated as private motorboat Chanticleer until 1917 and from 1918

General characteristics
- Type: Patrol vessel
- Length: 37 ft 5 in (11.40 m)

The first USS Chanticleer (SP-663) was a United States Navy patrol vessel in commission from 1917 to 1918.

Chanticleer was built as a private motorboat by Wilton C. Crosby. On 21 May 1917, the U.S. Navy acquired her from her owner, H.S. Hutchinson of New Bedford, Massachusetts, for use as a section patrol boat during World War I. She was commissioned on 22 May 1917 as USS Chanticleer (SP-663).

Assigned to the 2nd Naval District in southern New England, Chanticleer carried out patrol duties in for the rest of World War I.

Chanticleer was returned to Hutchinson on 25 November 1918.
