= USS Capable =

Two ships of the United States Navy have been named Capable.

- USS Capable (AM-155), was a minesweeper launched 16 November 1942, and commissioned 5 December 1943. Capable was decommissioned 16 August 1945 and transferred to the Soviet Union under lend-lease.
- USNS Capable (T-AGOS-16), was an Ocean Surveillance Ship, launched on 28 October 1988. It was decommissioned on 14 September 2004.
