= USS Cepheus =

USS Cepheus may refer to one of these two ships of the United States Navy named after the northern constellation of Cepheus:

- USS Cepheus (AKA-18), launched on 23 October 1943 and transferred to the US Navy on 15 December 1943.
- USS Cepheus (AK-265), acquired from the US Army on 12 June 1951 and lent to South Korea the same day.
