= USS Chehalis =

At least two ships of the United States Navy have borne the name USS Chehalis.

- USS Chehalis (AOG-48), a Patapsco-class gasoline tanker acquired by the U.S. Navy for the dangerous task of transporting gasoline to warships in the fleet, and to remote Navy stations.
- USS Chehalis (PGM-94), an Asheville-class gunboat of the U.S. Navy.
