= USS Corinthia =

Patrol vessel of the United States Navy

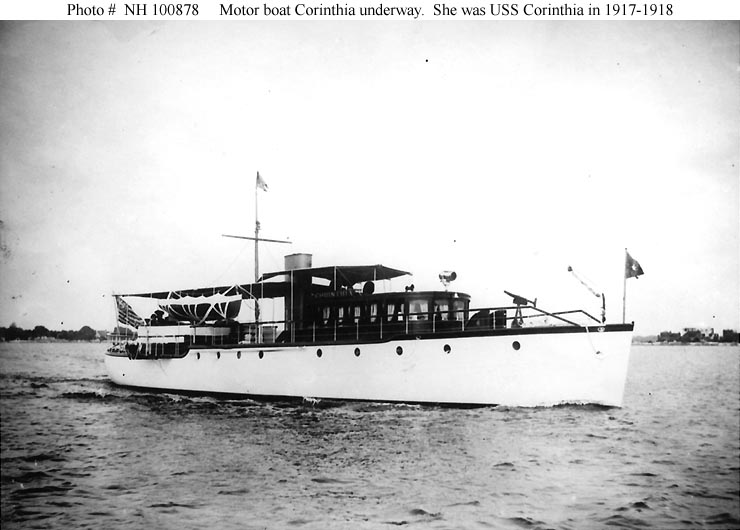
- Corinthia as a private motorboat sometime between 1909 and 1917.

History

United States
- Name: USS Corinthia
- Namesake: Previous name retained
- Builder: Charles Seabury & Company, Morris Heights, the Bronx, New York
- Completed: 1909
- Acquired: 1917
- Commissioned: 14 May 1917
- Decommissioned: 6 December 1918
- Fate: Returned to owner 7 December 1918
- Notes: Operated as private motorboat Corinthia 1909–1917 and from 1918

General characteristics
- Type: Patrol vessel
- Length: 85 ft (26 m)
- Beam: 14 ft 4 in (4.37 m)
- Draft: 3 ft 9 in (1.14 m)
- Speed: 12 knots
- Complement: 12
- Armament: 1 × 3-pounder gun; 1 × 1-pounder gun

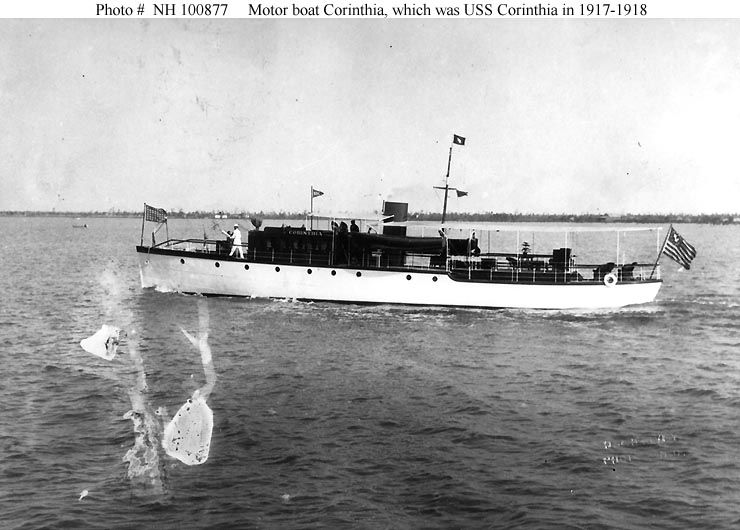
A damaged photograph of Corinthia as a private motorboat sometime between 1909 and 1917.

USS Corinthia (SP-938) was a United States Navy patrol vessel in commission from 1917 to 1918.

Corinthia was built as a private motorboat of the same name in 1909 by Charles Seabury & Company at Morris Heights in the Bronx, New York. In 1917, the U.S. Navy acquired her under a free lease from her owner for use as a section patrol boat during World War I. She was commissioned as USS Corinthia (SP-938) on 14 May 1917.

Assigned to the 8th Naval District, Corinthia patrolled off the coast of Texas and Louisiana for the rest of World War I.

Corinthia was decommissioned on 6 December 1918 and returned to her owner the following day.
