= USS Colusa =

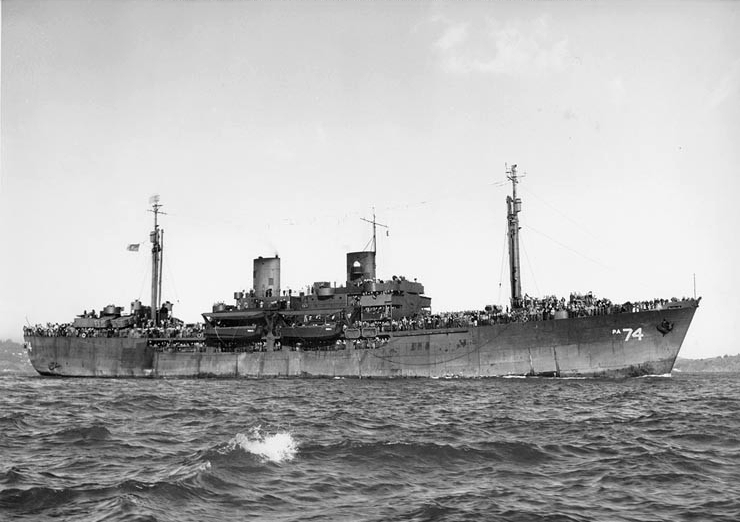

History

United States
- Name: USS Colusa (APA-74)
- Namesake: Colusa County, California
- Builder: Consolidated Steel
- Launched: 7 October 1944
- Sponsored by: Mrs J. F. Chandler
- Acquired: 18 December 1944
- Commissioned: 20 December 1944
- Decommissioned: 16 May 1946
- Fate: Scrapped 2 March 1966

General characteristics
- Class & type: Gilliam-class attack transport
- Displacement: 4,247 tons (lt), 7,080 t.(fl)
- Length: 426 ft (130 m)
- Beam: 58 ft (18 m)
- Draft: 16 ft (4.9 m)
- Propulsion: Westinghouse turboelectric drive, 2 boilers, 2 propellers, Design shaft horsepower 6,000
- Speed: 17 knots
- Capacity: 47 Officers, 802 Enlisted
- Crew: 27 Officers, 295 Enlisted
- Armament: 1 x 5"/38 caliber dual-purpose gun mount, 4 x twin 40mm gun mounts, 10 x single 20mm gun mounts
- Notes: MCV Hull No. ?, hull type S4-SE2-BD1

USS Colusa (APA-74) was a Gilliam-class attack transport that served with the United States Navy from 1944 to 1946. She was scrapped in 1966.

== History ==
Colusa was named after a county in California. She was launched 7 October 1944 by Consolidated Steel at San Pedro, California, under a Maritime Commission contract; acquired by the Navy 18 December 1944; commissioned 20 December 1944, and reported to the Pacific Fleet.

Colusa stood out from San Francisco 15 February 1945 for Pearl Harbor, arriving 21 February. She departed Pearl Harbor 27 February, discharged cargo at Eniwetok, Tinian, and Guam and returned to Pearl Harbor 26 March for training and inter-island transport duties until 24 June.

After a cargo-passenger voyage to Midway, she sailed 4 July from Pearl Harbor for San Francisco, where she disembarked passengers and loaded cargo for Pearl Harbor, returning 30 July.

=== Post-war ===
After another voyage to carry men to Midway, Colusa departed Pearl Harbor 1 September and called at Saipan, Sasebo, Okinawa, and Wakayama on duty redeploying occupation personnel. Between 7 October, when she cleared Wakayama, and 5 January 1946, when she arrived at San Francisco, she crossed the Pacific on two Operation Magic Carpet voyages, calling at Guam, Seattle, Pearl Harbor, Nouméa, Brisbane, Hollandia, and Manus to load homeward-bound servicemen.

She sailed from San Francisco 16 January to transport Canadian naval officers to Sydney, Australia, called at Brisbane and New Caledonia, and returned to San Francisco 1 March.

=== Decommissioning ===
Colusa returned to Pearl Harbor 6 April, and there was decommissioned 16 May 1946, and transferred to the Maritime Commission 14 August 1947 for disposal. Her final disposition was the Bikini Atoll where they had atomic bomb testing after the war. She was scrapped 2 March 1966.
