= USS Carnation =

Gunboat of the United States Navy

History

United States
- Ordered: as Ajax
- Builder: Neafie & Levy
- Laid down: date unknown
- Launched: 1863 at Philadelphia, Pennsylvania
- Acquired: 24 August 1863
- Commissioned: 20 October 1863
- Decommissioned: 8 July 1865
- Stricken: 1865 (est.)
- Fate: Sold, 10 August 1865

General characteristics
- Displacement: 82 tons
- Length: 73 ft 6 in (22.40 m)
- Beam: 17 ft 6 in (5.33 m)
- Draught: 7 ft 6 in (2.29 m)
- Propulsion: steam engine; screw propelled
- Speed: 10 knots
- Complement: 19
- Armament: one 20-pounder rifled gun; one 12-pounder rifled gun

USS Carnation was a steamer acquired by the Union Navy during the American Civil War. She was used by the Navy to patrol navigable waterways of the Confederacy to prevent the South from trading with other countries.

== Built in Philadelphia in 1863 ==
Carnation was built in 1863 by Neafie and Levy of Philadelphia as Ajax; purchased by the Navy and renamed Carnation 24 August 1863; commissioned 20 October 1863 and reported to the South Atlantic Blockading Squadron.

== Civil War service ==
Carnation arrived on station off Charleston, South Carolina, 6 November 1863. Serving the squadron in its effective work of preventing overseas supplies from reaching the Confederacy, Carnation ferried men and supplies, and performed picket duty. She served in the South Carolina area until 27 July 1865, when she sailed for Philadelphia.

== Post-war decommissioning and sale ==
Carnation was decommissioned 8 July 1865, and sold 10 August 1865.
