= USS Connewango =

Tugboat of the United States Navy

History

United States
- Name: Connewango
- Builder: Consolidated Shipbuilding Corporation, Morris Heights, New York
- Laid down: 1944
- Launched: 29 July 1944
- Completed: November 1944
- Reclassified: Harbor Tug, Large YTB-388, 15 May 1944
- Stricken: 1986
- Identification: IMO number: 8971669
- Fate: Sold to Gaelic Tugboat Co., Detroit, MI., renamed Shannon

General characteristics
- Class & type: Sassaba-class harbor tug
- Displacement: 260 tons; 345 tons (full)
- Length: 100 ft 0 in (30.48 m)
- Beam: 25 ft 0 in (7.62 m)
- Draft: 9 ft 7 in (2.92 m) (full)
- Speed: 12 knots (22 km/h; 14 mph)
- Complement: 14
- Armament: 2 x 0.5 in (12.7 mm) machine guns

Connewango was authorized as YT-388, but reclassified YTB-388 on 15 May 1944 prior to launching by the Consolidated Shipbuilding Corporation, Morris Heights, New York, on 29 July of that year. Completed in November, she was assigned to the 3rd Naval District where she performed patrol and towing duties. In 1946 she was transferred to the 6th Naval District where she continued until being struck in 1986.
