= USS Carlotta =

Patrol vessel of the United States Navy

History

United States
- Name: USS Carlotta
- Namesake: Previous name retained
- Acquired: August 1917
- Fate: Returned to owner October 1918
- Notes: Operated as civilian motorboat Carlotta until 1917 and from 1918

General characteristics
- Type: Patrol vessel
- Tonnage: 9 Gross register tons

USS Carlotta (SP-1785) was a United States Navy patrol vessel in service from 1917 to 1918.

Carlotta was built as a civilian motorboat of the same name. In August 1917, the U.S. Navy obtained her from her owner, the Commonwealth of Virginia, for use as a section patrol boat during World War I. She was placed in service as USS Carlotta (SP-1785).

Assigned to the 5th Naval District, Carlotta performed patrol duty at Cape Charles and radio inspection duty at Newport News, Virginia, for the rest of World War I.

The Navy returned Carlotta to the Commonwealth of Virginia in October 1918.
