= USS Cuttlefish =

Two submarines of the United States Navy have been named Cuttlefish for the cuttlefish, a ten-armed marine mollusk similar to the squid.

- USS Cuttlefish (SS-11), was a B-class submarine that was renamed B-2.
- USS Cuttlefish (SS-171), was a Cachalot-class submarine that served in the opening days of World War II.
