= USS Canandaigua =

USS Canandaigua may refer to:

- USS Canandaigua (1862), was a screw sloop in service from 1862 until 1875
- USS Canandaigua (ID-1694), was a minelayer, which served from 1918 until 1919
- USS Canandaigua (IX-233), was an auxiliary vessel which only served for 2 months in 1945 before sinking
- USS Canandaigua (PC-1246), was a submarine chaser in service from 1943 until 1947 and named Canandaigua in 1956
