= USS Courlan =

USS Courlan is a name used more than once by the U.S. Navy:

- USS Courlan (AMc-44), a coastal minesweeper which served in an "in service" status from 1941 to 1947.
- YMS-114 was reclassified and named USS Courlan (AMS-44) on 1 September 1947.
