= USS Courtenay P =

Patrol vessel of the United States Navy

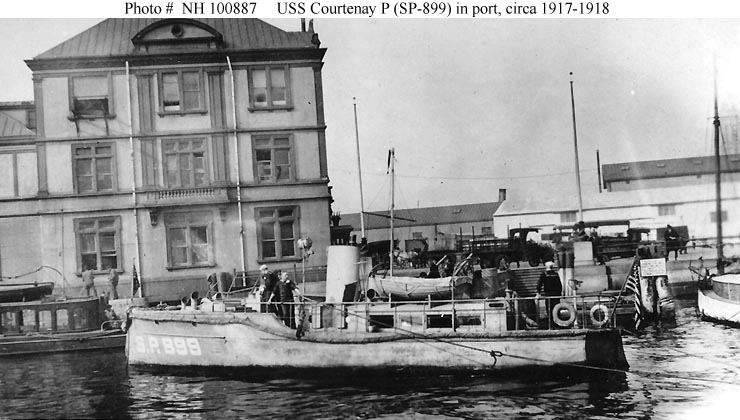
- USS Courtenay P sometime in 1917 or 1918.

History

United States
- Name: USS Courtenay P (1917–1918); USS SP-899 (1918)
- Namesake: Courtenay P was her previous name retained; SP-899 was her section patrol number
- Builder: Gas Engine and Power Company, Morris Heights, the Bronx, New York
- Completed: ca. 1916
- Acquired: Ordered delivered 5 July 1917
- Commissioned: 30 August 1917
- Renamed: SP-899 in 1918
- Fate: Returned to owner 12 December 1918
- Notes: Operated as private motorboat Courtenay P 1916-1917 and from 1918

General characteristics
- Type: Patrol vessel
- Length: 52 ft (16 m)

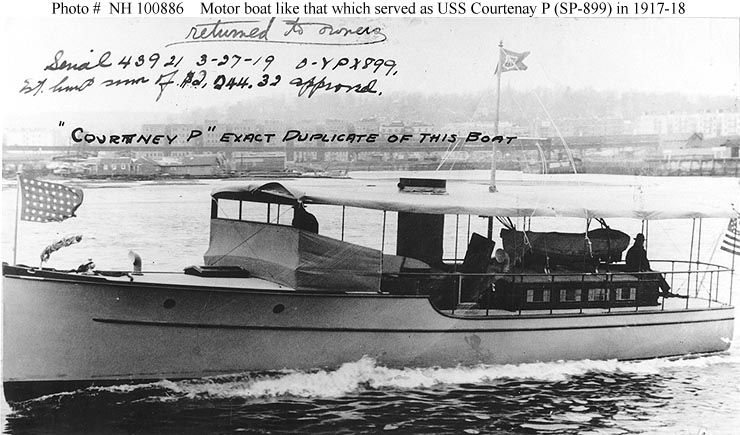
An unidentified private motorboat the United States Navy described as an "exact duplicate" of Courtney P, showing Courtenay P's appearance prior to her U.S. Navy service.

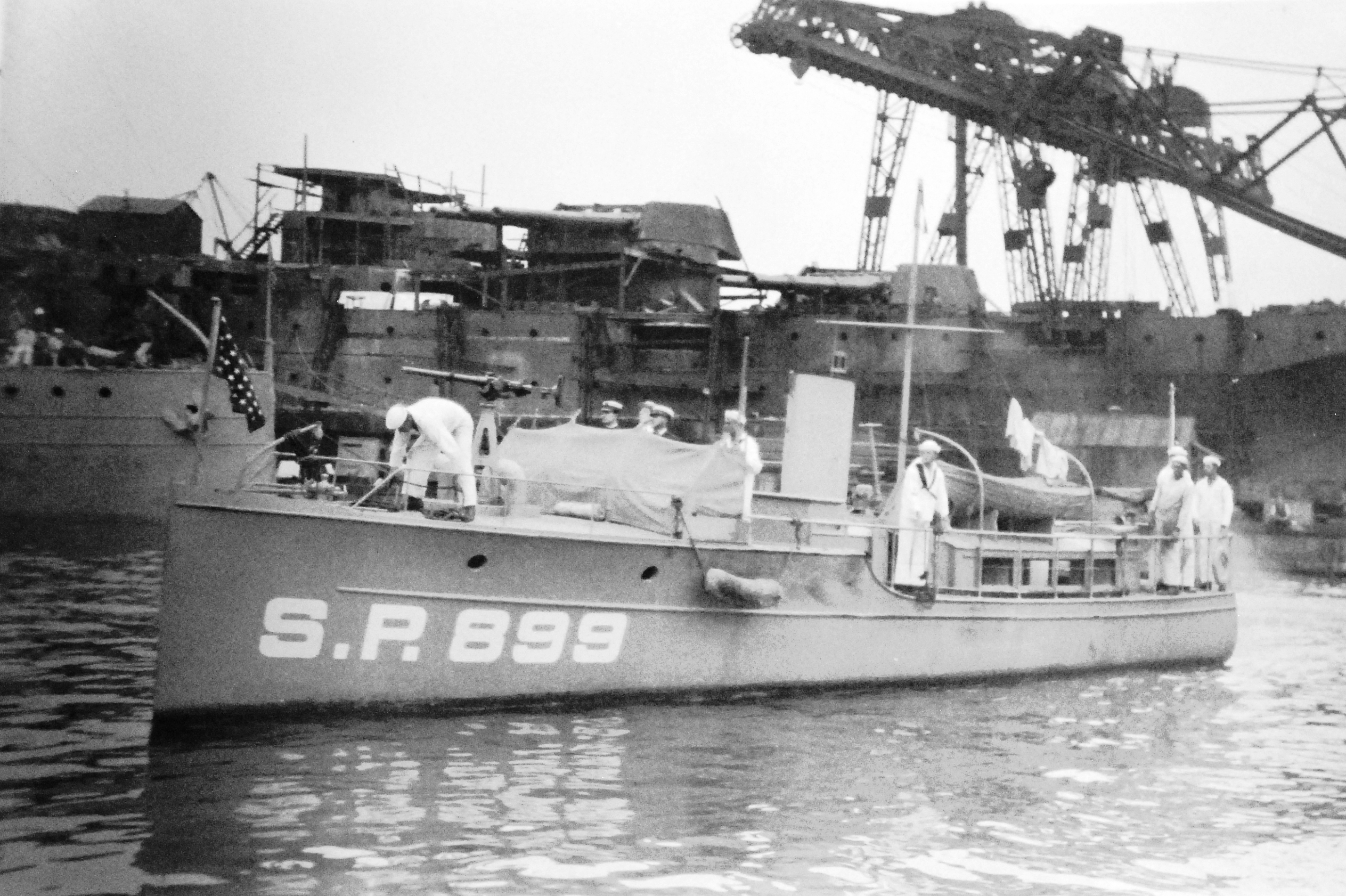
Courtenay P at Brooklyn Navy Yard, New York, 15 September 1917

USS Courtenay P (SP-899) was a United States Navy patrol vessel in commission from 1917 to 1918.

Courtenay P was built as a private motorboat of the same name in about 1916 by the Gas Engine and Power Company at Morris Heights in the Bronx, New York. On 5 July 1917, she was ordered delivered to the U.S. Navy for use as a section patrol boat during World War I. She was commissioned as USS Courtenay P (SP-899) on 30 August 1917. In 1918, her name was changed to USS SP-899.

On 6 July 1918, the Navy declared SP-899 unfit for further service and ordered her returned to her owner. Accordingly, she was duly returned to her owner on 12 December 1918.

== Bibliography ==
- Department of the Navy Naval History and Heritage Command Online Library of Selected Images: Civilian Ships: Courtenay P (American Motor Boat, circa 1916). Served as USS Courtenay P (SP-899) and USS SP-899 in 1917-1918
- Photo gallery of USS Courtenay P at NavSource Naval History
