= USS Carrabasset =

Two ships of the United States Navy have borne the name USS Carrabasset, in honor of the Carrabassett River, a stream in Franklin County and Somerset Counties, Maine.

- USS Carrabasset (1864), was a side-wheel steamer, which was purchased and commissioned in 1864. Carrabasset was decommissioned and sold in 1865.
- USS Carrabasset (AT-35), was a tugboat launched in 1919. She was decommissioned in 1922 and transferred to the Treasury Department, for use by the Coast Guard in 1924.
