= USS Courier =

Three ships of the United States Navy have been named Courier, after a courier, a messenger or traveling attendant.

- USS Courier (1861), a storeship purchased 7 September 1861.
- USS Courier (1912), a ferry launch, formerly named Hope, which served as commandant's barge and general service ship at Charleston Navy Yard from 1912 to 1918.
- USS Courier (AMc-72), a coastal minesweeper which served in "in service" status in the 1st Naval District from 1941 to 1947.
- USNS Courier (T-AK-5019), A cargo ship launched in 1962 and scrapped in 2008
