= USS Comet (SP-772) =

Patrol vessel of the United States Navy

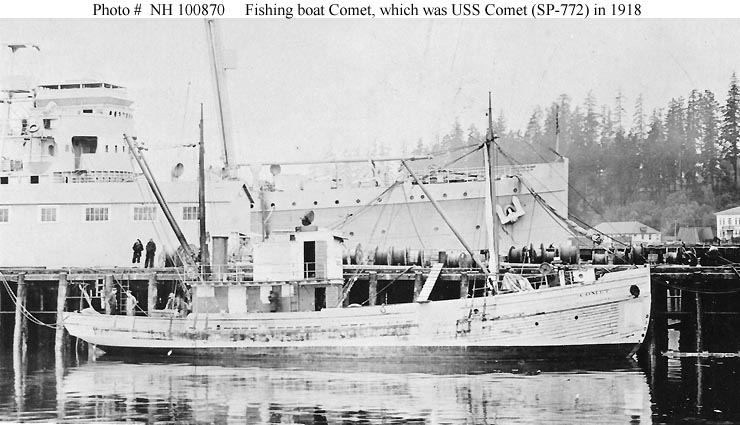
- Comet as a commercial fishing trawler, apparently at the Puget Sound Navy Yard in Bremerton, Washington, probably around the time of her November 1917 acquisition by the United States Navy.

History

United States
- Name: Comet
- Namesake: Previous name retained
- Builder: E. W. Heath & Company, Tacoma, Washington
- Completed: 1910
- Acquired: 26 November 1917
- Commissioned: 15 February 1918
- Fate: Returned to owner 23 August 1918
- Notes: Operated as commercial fishing trawler Comet 1910-1917 and from 1918

General characteristics
- Type: Patrol vessel
- Tonnage: 107 Gross register tons

The second USS Comet (SP-772) (Note: Although all sources (including NavSource Online) list Comet as SP-772, NavSource Online has a duplicate entry for her (at ) as SP-722. However, and confusingly, the characteristics for Comet given at NavSource's SP-772 entry do not appear to match those for Comet based on the other sources, while the characteristics for her at NavSource's SP-722 do appear to match Comet's data.) was a United States Navy patrol vessel in commission during 1918.

Comet was built as a commercial motor fishing trawler of the same name in 1910 by E. W. Heath & Company at Tacoma, Washington. On 26 November 1917, the U.S. Navy acquired her from her owner, the San Juan Fishing & Packing Company of Seattle, Washington, for use as a section patrol vessel during World War I. She was commissioned as USS Comet (SP-772) on 15 February 1918.

Assigned to the 13th Naval District in the Pacific Northwest area of the United States, Comet served on naval duties for about the next six months.

In August 1918, the Commandant, 13th Naval District, received orders to return Comet to her owner. Accordingly, Comet was returned to San Juan Fishing & Packing on 23 August 1918.
