= USS Coyote =

Patrol vessel of the United States Navy

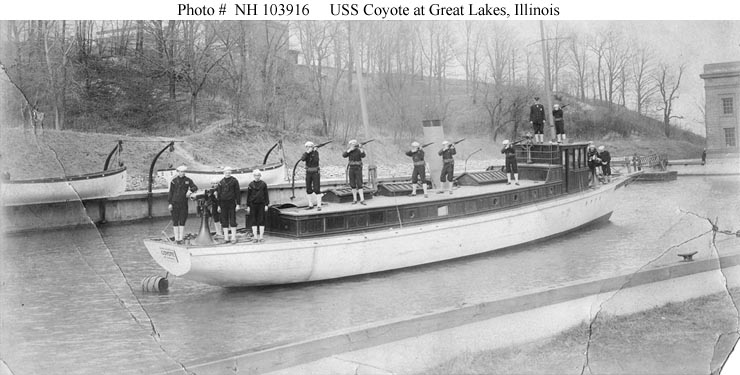
- A damaged photograph of USS Coyote in the boat basin at Great Lakes Naval Training Station at Great Lakes, Illinois, ca. 1917. She is still in her civilian paint scheme, with Coyote of Chicago painted on her stern.

History

United States
- Name: USS Coyote
- Namesake: Previous name retained
- Completed: 1897
- Acquired: 7 April 1917
- Commissioned: 7 April 1917
- Stricken: 17 June 1919
- Fate: Sold 13 December 1919
- Notes: Operated as private motorboat 1897-1917

General characteristics
- Type: Patrol vessel, training vessel, and supply boat
- Length: 89 ft (27 m)
- Armament: 2 × 1-pounder guns

USS Coyote (SP-84) was United States Navy patrol boat, training vessel and supply boat in commission from 1917 to 1919.

Coyote was a civilian motorboat completed in 1897. The U.S. Navy purchased her from her owner, Sylvester Sparling of Evanston, Illinois, for World War I service on 7 April 1917 and commissioned her as USS Coyote (SP-84) the same day.

Coyote was assigned to the 9th Naval District for patrol duty at Great Lakes Naval Training Station at Great Lakes, Illinois, and at Chicago, Illinois. She also was used also to instruct enlisted men and transport supplies, being laid up each winter when the Great Lakes iced over.

Coyote was stricken from the Navy List on 17 June 1919 and sold on 13 December 1919.
