= USS Cochise =

Tugboat of the United States Navy

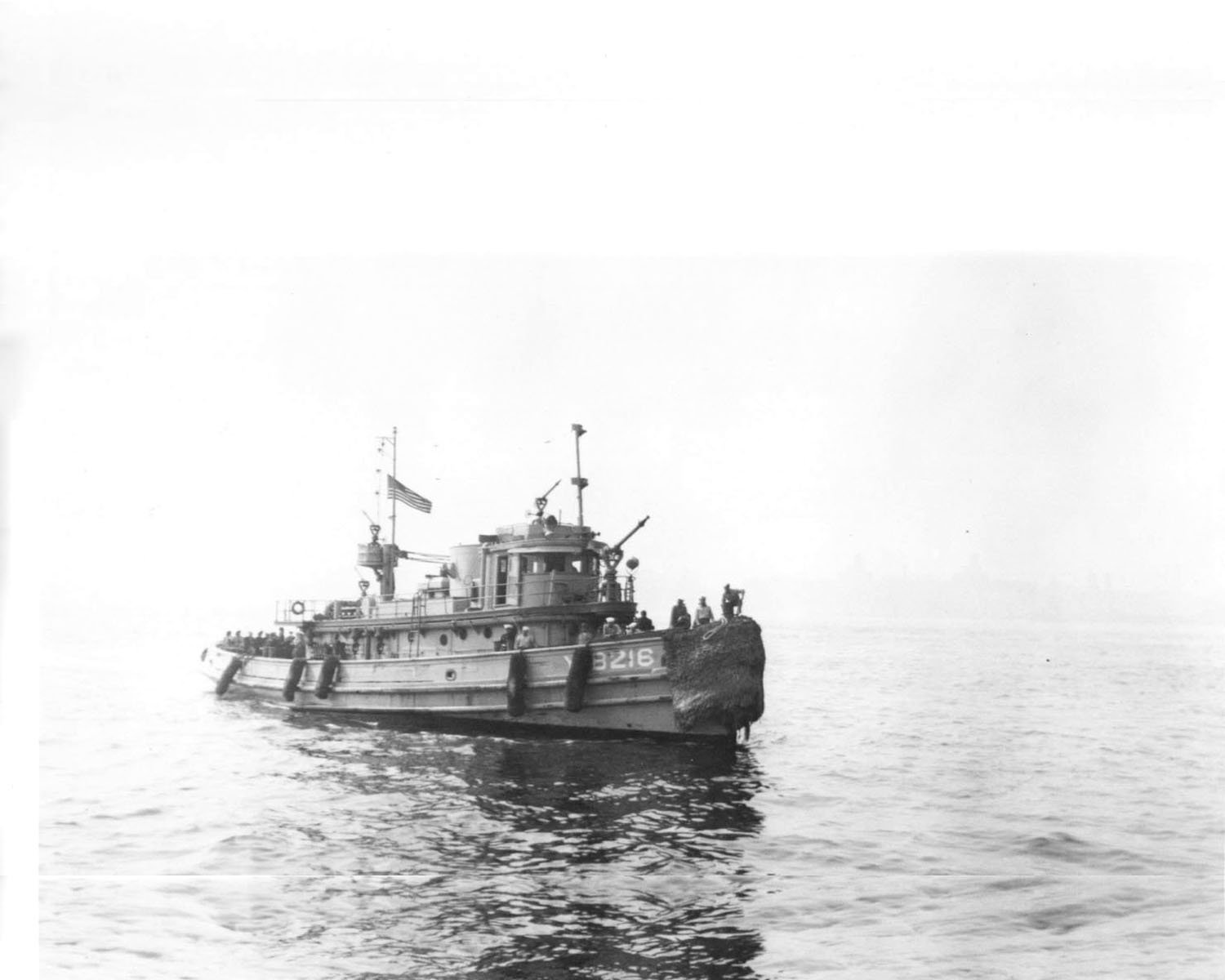

History

United States
- Name: Cochise
- Namesake: Cochise
- Builder: W. A. Robinson Inc.
- Acquired: 1944
- Decommissioned: 1966
- Homeport: New York, NY
- Fate: Unknown

General characteristics
- Type: Large Harbor Tug
- Tonnage: 410 long tons (420 t)
- Length: 110 ft (34 m)
- Beam: 27 ft (8.2 m)
- Draft: 11 ft 4 in (3.45 m)
- Installed power: 1,000 shp (750 kW)
- Propulsion: Diesel Engine; 1 × Propeller
- Armament: 2 x 0.50 Cal Machine Guns

USS Chochise (YTB-216) was a tugboat of the United States Navy named for Cochise, a chief of the Chokonen band of the Chiricahua Apache.

== Construction ==
She was laid down as a wooden-hulled ship (Originally YT-216) in Ipswich by W. A. Robinson Inc. In July 1944, she was acquired by the United States Navy and assigned to New York Harbor.

== Service history ==
Chochise remained in service until 1966, when decommissioned and struck from the Naval Vessel Register.
