= USS Cardinal (AM-67) =

Minesweeper of the United States Navy

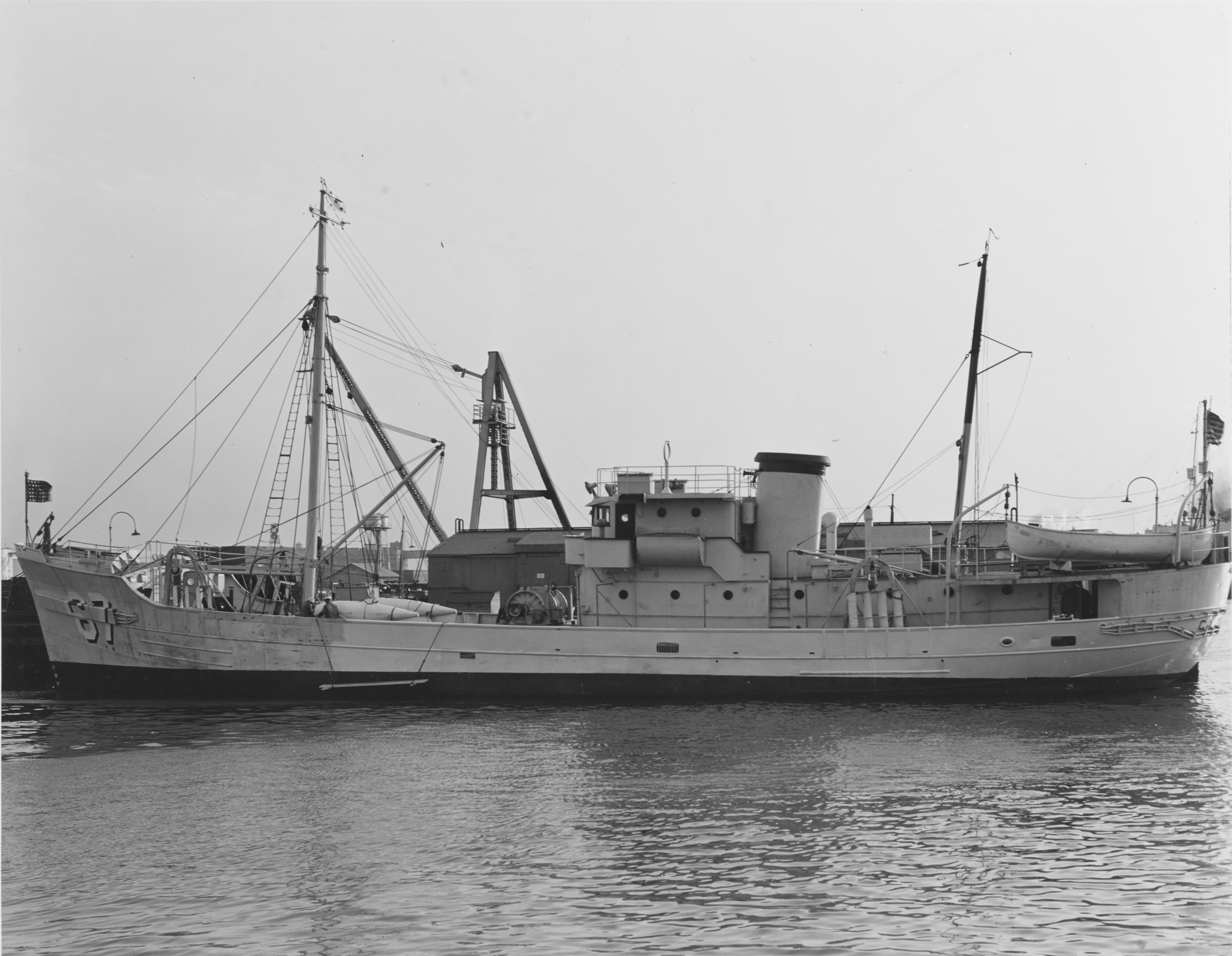
- USS Cardinal (AM-67) At Hampton Roads, Virginia, 25 November 1940

History

United States
- Name: USS Cardinal
- Builder: Bath Iron Works, Bath, Maine
- Laid down: 20 April 1937, MV Jeanne d'Arc
- Launched: 21 August 1937
- Acquired: 19 August 1940
- Commissioned: 2 November 1940
- Decommissioned: 8 September 1944
- Stricken: 23 September 1944
- Fate: Transferred to War Shipping Administration for disposal, 29 August 1945

General characteristics
- Class & type: Bullfinch-class minesweeper
- Displacement: 425 long tons (432 t)
- Length: 136 ft 4 in (41.55 m)
- Beam: 24 ft (7.3 m)
- Draft: 11 ft (3.4 m)
- Propulsion: 1 × 700 hp (522 kW) Fairbanks-Morse diesel engine, 1 shaft
- Speed: 10 knots (19 km/h; 12 mph)
- Armament: • 1 × 3"/50 caliber gun

USS Cardinal (AM-67) was a Bullfinch-class minesweeper in the United States Navy during World War II.

The ship was laid down on 20 April 1937 by Bath Iron Works, Bath, Maine, as the Jeanne D'Arc for F. J. O'Hara and Sons, Inc. of Boston, Massachusetts. Launched on 21 August 1937, the ship was delivered on 23 October 1937. Renamed Cardinal on 14 August 1940, she was acquired by the Navy on 19 August 1940. Commissioned in ordinary on 28 August 1940, and converted to a Minesweeper at the Norfolk Navy Yard, she was commissioned in full as USS Cardinal (AM-67) on 2 November 1940. Conversion was completed by 22 April 1941.

== East Coast operations ==
Cardinal served in the 5th Naval District for four years, patrolling and sweeping coastal waters from Norfolk, Virginia to Cape May, New Jersey.

== Decommissioning ==
She was decommissioned at Norfolk, Virginia on 8 September 1944 and struck from the Navy List on 23 September 1944. Transferred to the War Shipping Administration for disposal on 29 August 1945. Fate unknown.
