= USS Crusader =

Two ships in the United States Navy have been named USS Crusader.

- USS Crusader (1858) was a steamship during the American Civil War.
- USS Crusader (ARS-2) was originally Osprey and was renamed in 1941.
