= USS Charles Mann =

Patrol vessel of the United States Navy

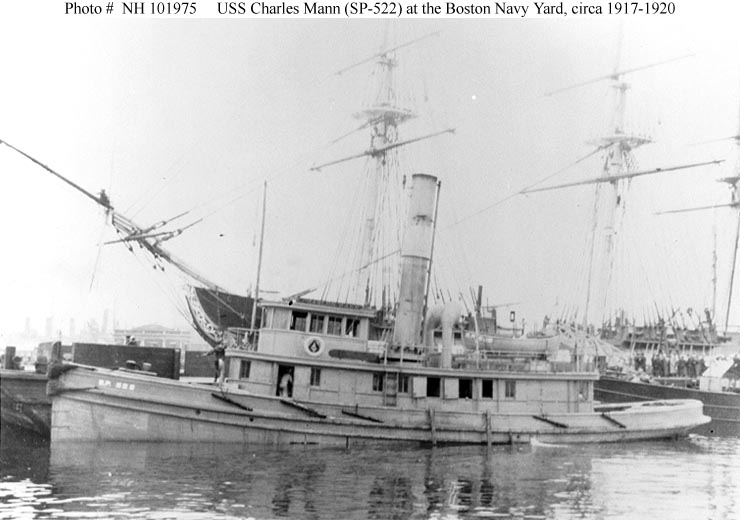
- USS Charles Mann (SP-522) at the Boston Navy Yard in Boston, Massachusetts, sometime between 1917 and 1919.The USS Constitution is in the background.

History

United States
- Name: USS Charles Mann
- Namesake: Previous name retained
- Completed: 1903
- Acquired: 6 or 7 June 1917
- Commissioned: 7 June 1917
- Decommissioned: 29 November 1919
- Fate: 27 February 1920
- Notes: Operated as commercial tug Charles Mann 1903-1917

General characteristics
- Type: Tug and patrol vessel
- Tonnage: 79 gross register tons
- Length: 77 ft 7 in (23.65 m)
- Beam: 21 ft 6 in (6.55 m)
- Draft: 10 ft (3.0 m) aft
- Speed: 9 knots
- Complement: 11
- Armament: 2 × 1-pounder guns

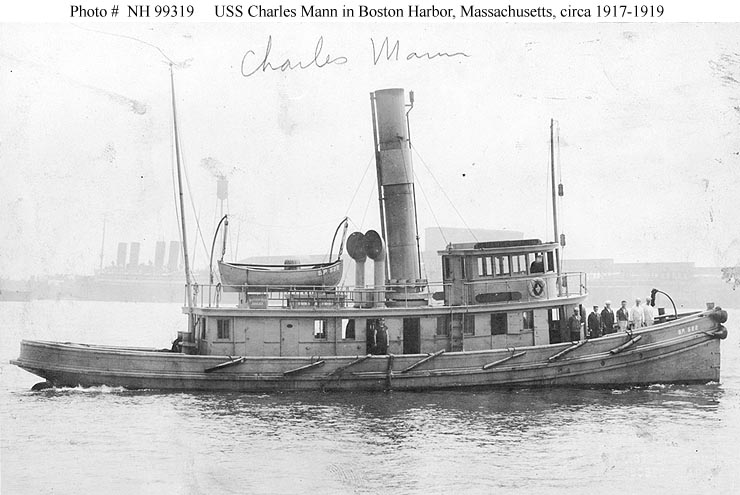
USS Charles Mann (SP-522) in Boston Harbor, Boston, Massachusetts, sometime between 1917 and 1919.

USS Charles Mann (SP-522), was a United States Navy tug and patrol vessel in commission from 1917 to 1919.

Charles Mann was built as a commercial tug of the same name in 1903 at South Portland, Maine. The U.S. Navy purchased her on 6 or 7 June 1917 for use as a tug and section patrol vessel during World War I. She was commissioned as USS Charles Mann (SP-522) on 7 June 1917.

Assigned to the 1st Naval District, Charles Mann carried out patrol duty and conducted towing operations in the Boston, Massachusetts, area for the rest of World War I and into 1919.

Charles Mann was decommissioned on 29 November 1919 and sold on 27 February 1920.
