= USS Conemaugh =

Two ships of the United States Navy have been named Conemaugh after the Conemaugh River in Pennsylvania.

- USS Conemaugh (1862), launched in 1862 and decommissioned in 1867.
- USS Conemaugh (AOG-62), commissioned in 1945 and decommissioned in 1946.
