= USS Clinton (1864) =

Tugboat of the United States Navy

History

United States
- Acquired: 14 June 1864
- Commissioned: c1864
- Decommissioned: c1870
- Fate: Sold, 3 August 1870

General characteristics
- Displacement: 50 tons
- Length: 58 ft 8 in (17.88 m)
- Beam: 15 ft 10 in (4.83 m)
- Draft: 7 ft (2.1 m)
- Propulsion: screw propeller
- Complement: 16

USS Clinton, originally named Lena Clinton, was a tugboat acquired by the Union Navy during the American Civil War. Her primary task was to guide ships in harbors, but she was also tasked with patrol duties.

== Service history ==
Lena Clinton was a tugboat operating in New York in the early 1860s. She was purchased there by the US Navy on 14 June 1864 during the American Civil War, and was renamed Clinton. She was assigned to duty with the North Atlantic Blockading Squadron for picket and tug service in the James River and at Norfolk Navy Yard until the end of the war. Arriving at New York Navy Yard 16 June 1865, she remained in use as a yard tug until sold 3 August 1870.
