= USS Chinook (SP-644) =

Patrol vessel of the United States Navy

History

United States
- Name: USS Chinook
- Namesake: Previous name retained
- Acquired: 1917
- Commissioned: 1917
- Fate: Returned to owner February 1918
- Notes: Operated as private motorboat Chinook until 1917 and from 1918

General characteristics
- Type: Patrol vessel

The first USS Chinook (SP-644) was a United States Navy patrol vessel in commission from 1917 to 1918.

Chinook was built as a private motorboat of the same name. In 1917, the U.S. Navy acquired her from her owner for use as a section patrol boat during World War I. She was enrolled in the Naval Coast Defense Reserve on 19 October 1917 and commissioned as USS Chinook (SP-644) in 1917.

Chinook performed patrol duty on the Detroit River for four months and was returned to her owner in February 1918.
