= Consolidated Steel Corporation =

US Shipyard in Texas and California

The Consolidated Steel Corporation was an American steel and shipbuilding business. Formed on 18 December 1928, the company built ships during World War II in two main locations: Wilmington, California, and Orange, Texas. It was created by the merger of Llewellyn Iron Works, Baker Iron Works and Union Iron Works, all of Los Angeles. The company entered the shipbuilding business in 1939. In 1948, now a pioneer producer of large-diameter pipelines, Consolidated Steel was renamed Consolidated Western Steel and acquired by U.S. Steel and operated as a wholly owned subsidiary.

The San Diego–based Consolidated Aircraft Corp. is not related and neither is the Union Iron Works of San Francisco. The company did not produce steel (the Llewellyn Iron Works did so during 1916 to 1923), neither from iron ores nor from pig iron, but rather fabricated standard steel mill product (plates and bars) into steel products (buildings, ships, pipes). In the 1950s, the company contributed ground equipment to the Project Nike missile system. In 1964, Consolidated was merged into the American Bridge Division of U.S. Steel.

== Orange shipyard ==
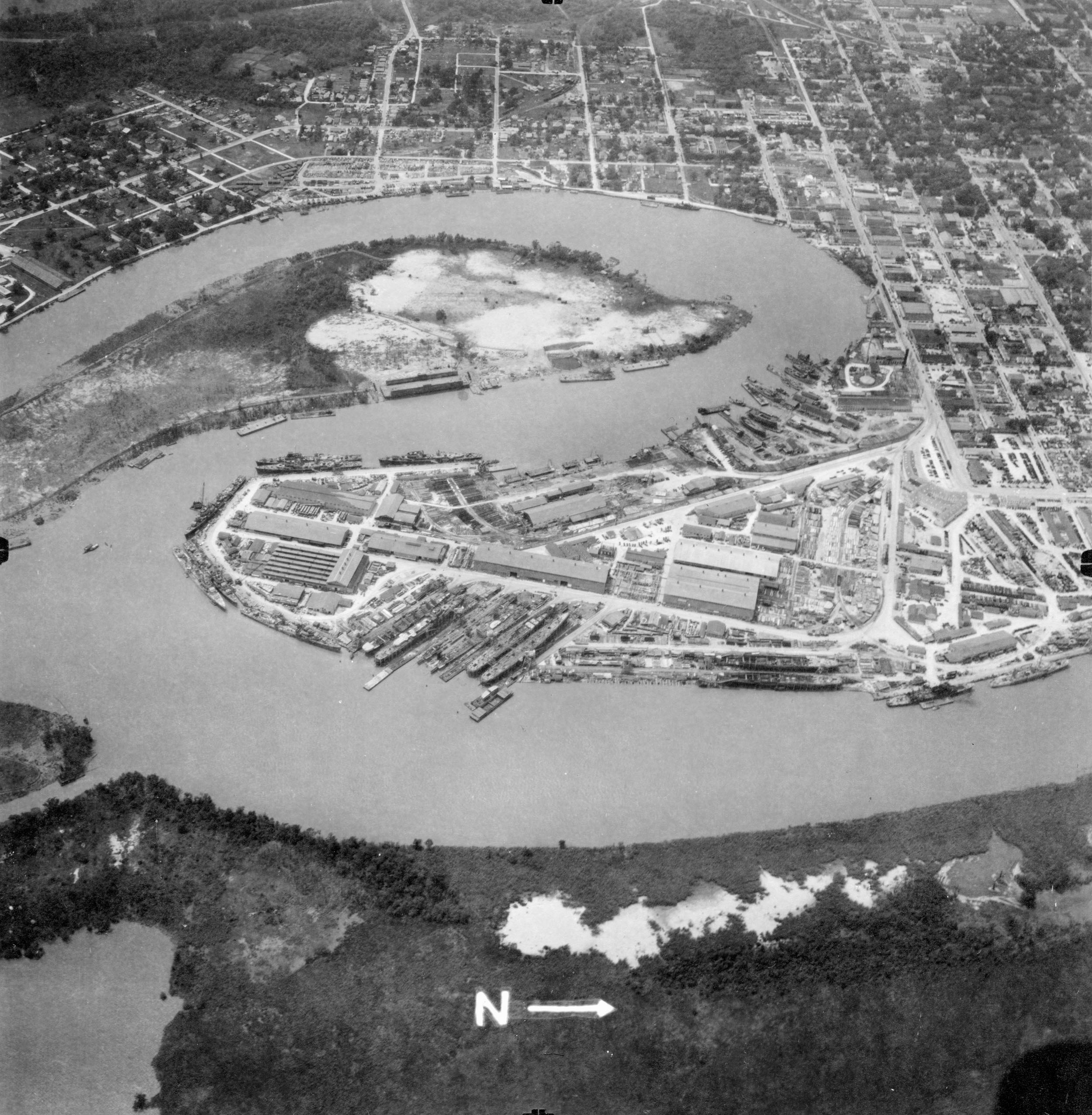
Orange shipyard in 1945, Levingston Shipbuilding Company just below the upper bend

The Orange, Texas, shipyard lay on the banks of the Sabine River at (30.086351°N 93.72434°W), a few miles upstream of the Sabine Pass that grants access to the Gulf of Mexico (Pennsylvania Shipyards, Inc. in Beaumont, Texas, made use of it as well). Consolidated Steel bought the Orange Car and Steel Company (railcars) property in February 1940 with the original intention of going into the business of barge and tug construction. Before November 1922 this company was called the Southern Dry Dock & Shipbuilding Company, which operated five building ways for wooden hull construction for the United States Shipping Board, of which six were launched and at least one, Gonzalis (1918), was fitted with engines.

The modest facilities were expanded when Consolidated Steel was awarded destroyer contracts from the U.S. Navy in September 1940. After the war the site was sold to U.S. Steel together with Consolidated's assets in Los Angeles and whatever was obtained from the merger with Western Pipe and Steel elsewhere. However, the wholly owned subsidiary and soon after the U.S. Steel corporate division both continued to operate as Consolidated Western Steel. The government-owned shipyard facilities were eventually bought by Consolidated Western Steel for $1,001,000 in the Summer of 1949, but not to be used for shipbuilding beyond the obligations imposed as part of the deal, to maintain this capability for some time. Another pipe mill was built in Orange during the boom years. At its peak durning the war, it employed 20,000 people. The first ship launched was the destroyer USS Aulick on March 2, 1942. The last ship launched was the destroyer USS Carpenter on December 28, 1945. United States Naval Station Orange was the overseer of the Navy projects.

Contracts for 12 Fletchers were authorized with the Two-Ocean Navy Act and awarded later in 1940 Fletchers were produced no more than six concurrently. Gearings were produced no more than ten concurrently. There were six slipways that could build one destroyer or destroyer escort and there were two side launching ways that could each build two destroyers or 3 destroyer escorts. The stern-first launching ways must obviously have been there first, see also launch photographs e.g.

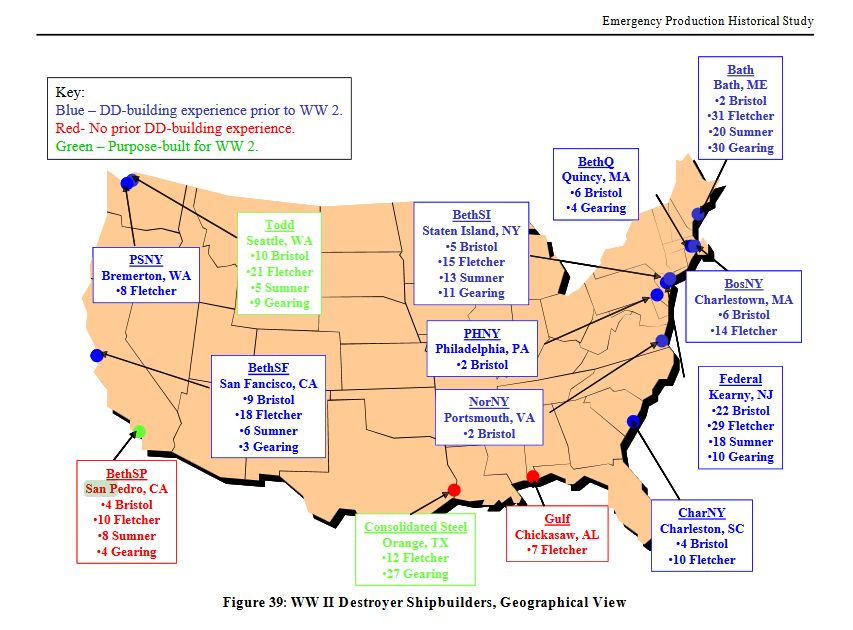
United States WW2 destroyer plants

- 39 of 415 destroyers
  - 12 of 175 Fletcher-class destroyers (built May 1941 – October 1942)
    - USS Aulick (DD-569) ... USS Young (DD-580)
  - 27 of 98 Gearing-class destroyers (built May 1944 – December 1945)
    - USS Corry (DD-817) ... USS Carpenter (DD-825)
    - USS Hawkins (DD-873) ... USS Meredith (DD-890)
- 102 of 563 destroyer escorts and APDs
  - 47 of 85 Edsall-class destroyer escorts (built June 1942 – December 1943)
    - USS Edsall (DE-129) ... USS Peterson (DE-152)
    - USS Harveson (DE-316) ... USS Martin H. Ray (DE-338)
  - 12 of 148 Buckley-class destroyer escorts (April 1943 – December 1943)
    - USS Tatum (DE-789) ... USS Jack W. Wilke (DE-800)
  - 34 of 83 John C. Butler-class destroyer escorts (built October 1943 – August 1944)
    - USS John C. Butler (DE-339) ... USS Williams (DE-372)
  - 6 of 6 Charles Lawrence-class high speed transports
    - that were completed as APDs (instead of converted from finished DEs)
  - 3 of 50 Crosley-class high speed transports
    - that were completed as APDs
- 106 of 923 Landing Craft Infantry (built 1942–1944)
  - Hull numbers 61–96, 943–1012

Levingston Shipbuilding Company and Weaver Shipyards round up the landscape of WW2 shipbuilding in Orange.

== Wilmington shipyard ==
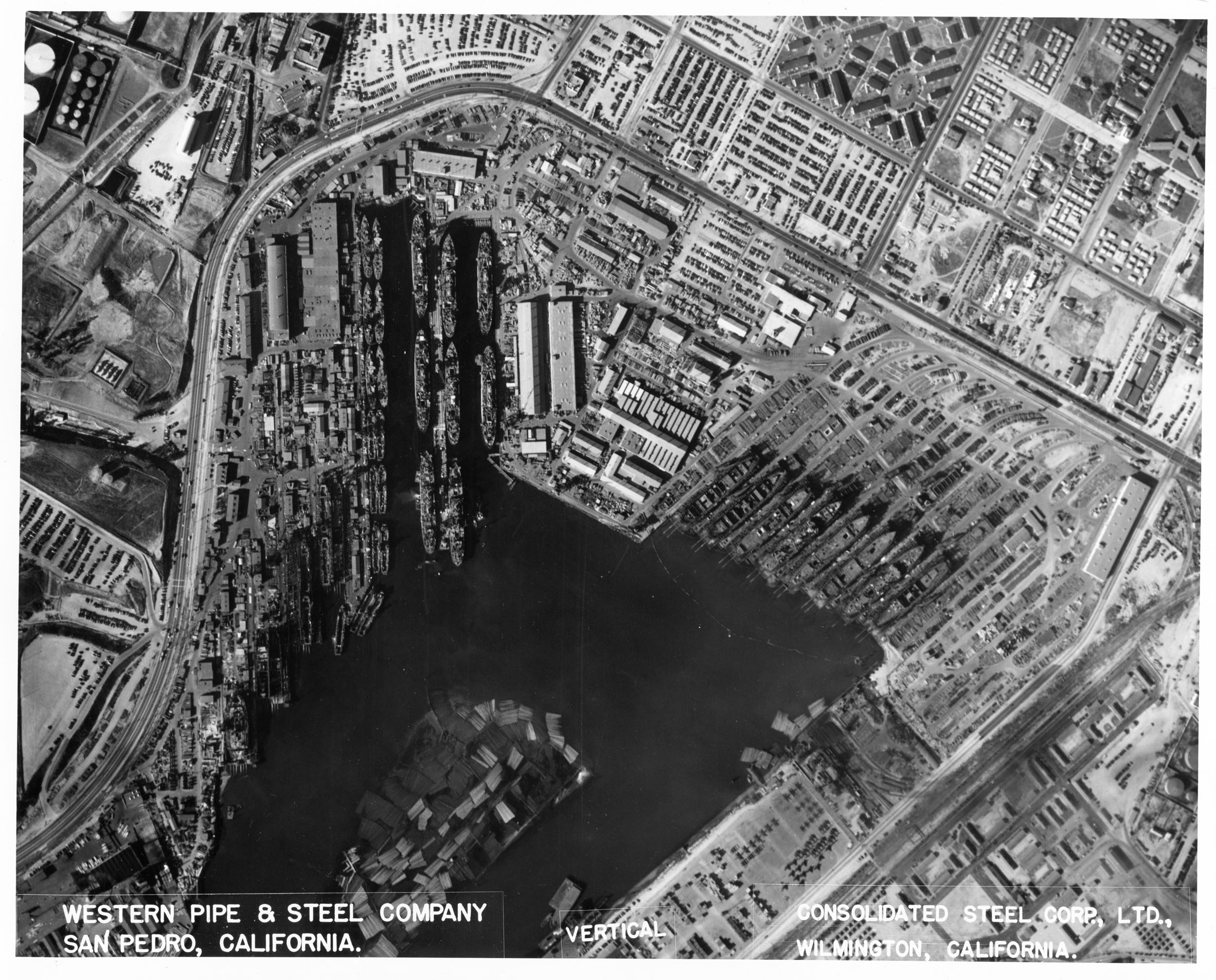
Wilmington shipyard (right) Western Pipe and Steel yard (left), the Los Angeles Shipbuilding Company yard is just out of frame at the bottom left corner

The Consolidated Steel Wilmington shipyard (33.76767°N 118.27254°W) in Wilmington, California was an emergency yard built in 1941 in the Port of Los Angeles West Basin after Consolidated Steel was awarded Maritime Commission contracts. At its peak, it employed 12,000 people, working on eight shipways on the 95-acre facility at 1100 W Harry Bridges Blvd, Wilmington. Production peaked on May 29, 1944, when it launched three large ships in only a 2 1/2-hour period. The yard was built as a temporary facility and, like most such war plants, it was closed after the war ended.

Together, the shipyards ranked Consolidated 29th among United States corporations in the value of wartime production contracts.

Fifteen of the C1-B were built with steam turbines supplied by Joshua Hendy Iron Works ("JH") instead of those built by Westinghouse ("WH"). Hendy also provided the 36 triple expansion steam engines that went into the patrol frigates.

The yard changed to a 2-shift rotation (10.5 hours) on June 12, 1944.

List of contracts:

Contract No.	Description	Type	Price
MCc 412	1 C-1B, full scantling, turbine	Lump sum	$2,150,814.96
MCc 413	1 C-1B, full scantling, turbine	Lump sum	$2,248,486.96
MCc 414	1 C-1B, full scantling, turbine	Lump sum	$2,248,486.96
MCc 415	1 C-1B, full scantling, turbine	Lump sum	$2,386,408.97
MCc 1275	1 P1-S2-L2, twin screw transport, turbine	Lump sum	$5,808,149.22
MCc 1276	1 P1-S2-L2, twin screw transport, turbine	Lump sum	$5,760,072.99
MCc 1953 and 1675	Acquisition and installation of plant equipment	Cost only	$13,133,630.60
MCc 1520	4 C-1B, full scantling, turbine	Price minus	complex
MCc 1790	9 C-1B, full scantling, turbine	Price minus	complex
MCc 1791	9 C-1B, full scantling, tubine	Price minus	complex
MCc 1792	8 C-1B, full scantling, turbine	Price minus	complex
MCc 2235	4 C-1B, full scantling, rurbine	Price minus	complex
MCc 7713	18 C-1B, full scantling, turbine; 13 troopships; 2 uncompleted hospital ships	Price minus	complex
MCc 7714	6 C-1B full scantling, turbine, 1 uncompleted hospital ship	Price minus	complex
MCc 8524	18 S2-S2-AQ-1 steel escort	Price minus	complex
MCc 15951	32 S4-SE2-BD1	Price minus	complex
MCc 26055	27 C1-M-AV1	Price minus	complex
DA MCc 857	30 C1-M-AV1 (28 delivered)	Price minus	complex
MCc 34768	10 C2-S-B1 (10 delivered), 6 R2-S-BV1 (0 delivered)	Selective price	complex

Ships built:

- 126 of 395 C1
  - 47 of 95 C1-B (14 of 61 in the assigned ranges below were built in the nearby Long Beach yard, in addition to the original 4)
    - Mormachawk (MC-263) ... Mormacgull (MC-266)
    - Mormaclark (MC-486) ... Cape Greig (MC-511)
    - Cape Stephens (MC-698) ... Cape Meredith (MC-701)
    - Hope (MC-1015) ... Cape Chalmers (MC-1028)
    - Cape Domingo (MC-1042) ... Cape Kumukaki (MC-1044)
    - Cape Catoche (MC-1693) ... Cape Saunders (MC-1695)
    - Cape Lilibeo (MC-2073) ... Cape Spear (MC-2079)
  - complete list of the 47 C1-B built in Wilmington
    - Comfort, launched 18 March 1943
    - Mercy, launched 25 March 1943
    - Cape Lilibeo JH launched 27 January 1944 in Wilmington
    - Cape Junction WH launched 11 March 1944
    - Cape Possession WH 77th ship launched 7 March 1944
    - Cape Tryon JH launched 22 February 1944
    - Cape Archway JH
    - Cape Catoche WH launched 13 January 1944
    - Cape Kumukaki WH launched 7 January 1944 (unpsec location)
    - Cape Kildare WH launched 23 December 1943
    - Cape Domingo JH 70th ship launched 11 December 1943
    - Cape Chalmers WH launched 29 June 1943, likely Wilmington
    - Cape Alexander WH launched 18 June 1943
    - Cape Isabel WH, launched 29 May 1943
    - Cape Victory WH
    - Cape Constance JH
    - Cape Georgia JH
    - Cape Martin JH
    - Cape Stephens WH 25th ship launched 16 February 1943 from slip No. 1
    - Cape Greig WH, launched 16 April 1943
    - Cape Meares WH, launched 5 April 1943
    - Cape San Juan WH launched 17 March 1943
    - Cape Elizabeth WH launched 3 March 1943; 27th C1
    - Cape Johnson WH 26th ship launched 20 February 1943 in Wilmington
    - Cape Ann WH launched 3 February 1943
    - Cape Mendocino WH 29th in CA, launched 24 January 1943
    - Cape Cleare WH 22nd C-1 launched 6 January 1943
    - Cape Perpetua WH 21st C-1 launched 28 December 1942
    - Alcoa Pegasus WH launched 18 October 1942
    - Alcoa Pointer WH 19th C-1 launched 11 October 1942
    - Alcoa Puritan WH 14th ship launched 27 September 1942
    - Alcoa Pilgrim WH 13th C-1 in W. launched 20 September 1942
    - Alcoa Partner WH
    - Cape Newenham WH 20th in W. launched 21 December 1942
    - Cape May WH 19th ship (unspec location) launched 12 December 1942
    - Cape Romain WH launched 27 November 1942
    - Cape Planter WH
    - Solon Turman WH 10th C-1 in W. launched 20 August 1942
    - Fred Morris WH 9th C-1 in W., built in 91 days, launched 10 August 1942
    - Jean Lykes WH launched 21 July 1942
    - Nancy Lykes WH 7th ship launched 14 July 1942 for Lykes Brothers SS Line
    - Mormactern WH launched 2 July 1942
    - Mormaclark WH 5th ship launched 20 June 1942 for Moore-McCormack Lines, keel laid 124 days ago
    - Mormacgull WH 4th ship launched 8 June 1942
    - Mormacdove WH - launched 1 June 42
    - Mormacwren WH - launched 22 May 42
    - Mormachawk WH - first ship launched at the yard on 11 May 1942 for Moore-McCormack Lines
  - 13 of 13 C1-S-AY1
    - Cape Berkely (MC-1029) ... Cape Washington (MC-1041)
    - all names in the form of "Cape X", all went to Britain as "Empire X"
    - SS Cape Girardeau 64th C-1 launched 7 November 1943
    - SS Cape Compass launched 24 July 1943
    - SS Cape Marshall launched 16 August 1943, presumably Wilmington
  - 55 of 211 C1-M-AV1
    - Diamond Knot (MC-2314) ... Crown Knot (MC-2331)
    - Sheepshank (MC-2461) ... Hickory Crest (MC-2473)
    - Hickory Glen (MC-2563) ... Coastal Telegrapher (MC-2586)
- 18 of 96 Tacoma-class frigates (S2-S1-AQ1) in 1943

Yard#	Name	Keel laid	Launched				
519	Long Beach	19 Mar 43	5 May 43	528	Orange	7 Jul 43	6 Aug 43
520	Belfast	26 Mar 43	20 May 43	529	Corpus Christi	17 Jul 43	17 Aug 43
521	Glendale	6 Apr 43	29 May 43	530	Hutchinson		27 Aug 43
522	San Pedro	17 Apr 43	11 Jun 43	531	Bisbee		7 Sep 43
523	Coronado	6 May 43	17 Jun 43	532	Gallup	18 Aug 43	17 Sep 43
524	Ogden	21 May 43	23 Jun 43	533	Rockford	28 Aug 43	27 Sep 43
525	Eugene	12 Jun 43	6 Jul 43	534	Muskogee	18 Sep 43	18 Oct 43
526	El Paso	18 Jun 43	16 Jul 43	535	Carson City	28 Sep 43	13 Nov 43
527	Van Buren	24 Jun 43	27 Jul 43	536	Burlington		7 Dec 43

- 32 of 32 Gilliam-class attack transport (S4-SE2-BD1) in 1944 and 1945

Yard#	Name	Keel laid	Launched	Yard#	Name	Keel laid	Launched
720	Gilliam	30 Nov 43	28 Mar 44	736	Cleburne		27 Sep 44
721	Appling		9 Apr 44	737	Colusa		7 Oct 44
722	Audrain	1 Dec 43	21 Apr 44	738	Cortland	12 Jul 44	18 Oct 44
723	Banner	24 Jan 44	3 May 44	739	Crenshaw		27 Oct 44
724	Barrow	28 Jan 44	11 May 44	740	Crittenden	31 Jul 44	6 Nov 44
725	Berrien	23 Feb 44	20 May 44	741	Cullman		17 Nov 44
726	Bladen	8 Mar 44	31 May 44	742	Dawson	29 Aug 44	27 Nov 44
727	Bracken	13 Mar 44	10 Jun 44	743	Elkhart		5 Dec 44
728	Briscoe	29 Mar 44	19 Jun 44	744	Fallon	28 Sep 44	14 Dec 44
729	Brule	10 Apr 44	30 Jun 44	745	Fergus		24 Dec 44
730	Burleson	22 Apr 44	11 Jul 44	746	Fillmore		4 Jan 45
731	Butte	4 May 44	20 Jul 44	747	Garrard	28 Oct 44	13 Jan 45
732	Carlisle	12 May 44	30 Jul 44	748	Gasconade	7 Nov 44	23 Jan 45
733	Carteret		15 Aug 44	749	Geneva		31 Jan 45
734	Catron		28 Aug 44	750	Niagara	20 Nov 44	10 Feb 45
735	Clarendon		12 Sep 44	751	Presidio	6 Dec 44	17 Feb 45

- 10 of 121 C2-S-B1

Yard#	USMC#	Owner	Name	Keel laid	Launched	Delivered
1358	2817	States Marine Corp.	Messenger	10 Jul 45	20 Oct 45	6 Feb 46
1359	2818	Grace Line	Spitfire	27 Jul 45	9 Nov 45	22 Feb 46
1360	2819	States Marine Corp.	Ocean Rover	8 Aug 45	29 Nov 45	15 Mar 46
1361	2820	States Marine Corp.	National Eagle	20 Aug 45	21 Dec 45	2 Apr 46
1362	2821	States Marine Corp.	Mountain Wave	24 Aug 45	15 Jan 46	18 Apr 46
1363	2822	States Marine Corp.	Carrier Dove	4 Sep 45	19 Feb 46	7 May 46
1364	2823	Agwilines	Twilight	15 Sep 45	5 Mar 46	24 May 46
1365	2824	Agwilines	Wild Ranger	8 Oct 45	28 Mar 46	14 Jun 46
1366	2825	Agwilines	Crest of the Wave	22 Oct 45	17 Apr 46	28 jun 46
1367	2868	Agwilines	Golden Light	9 Nov 45	29 Apr 46	10 Jul 46

Bethlehem San Pedro and California Shipbuilding were located nearby on Terminal Island.

== Long Beach shipyard ==
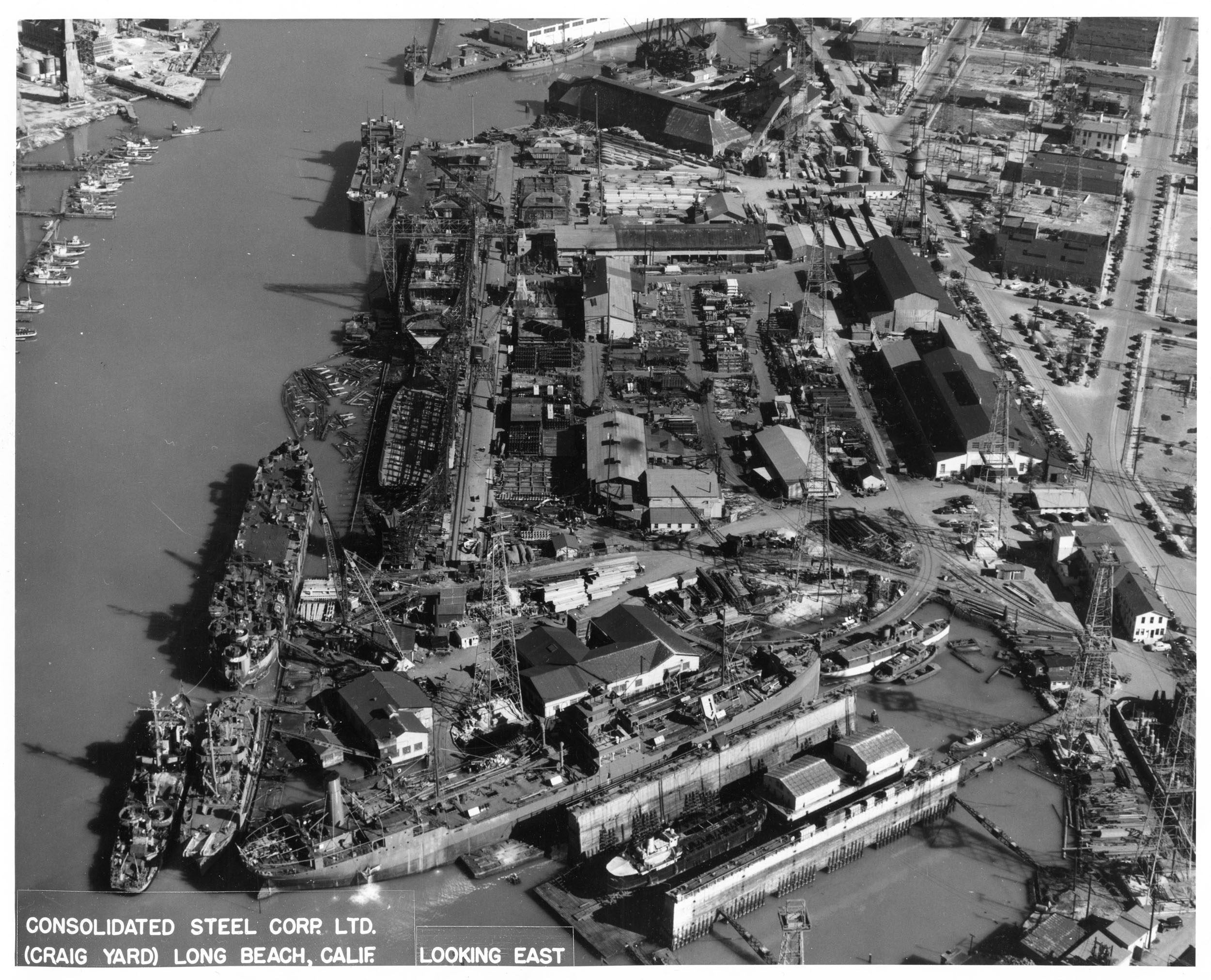
One and one half hull under construction

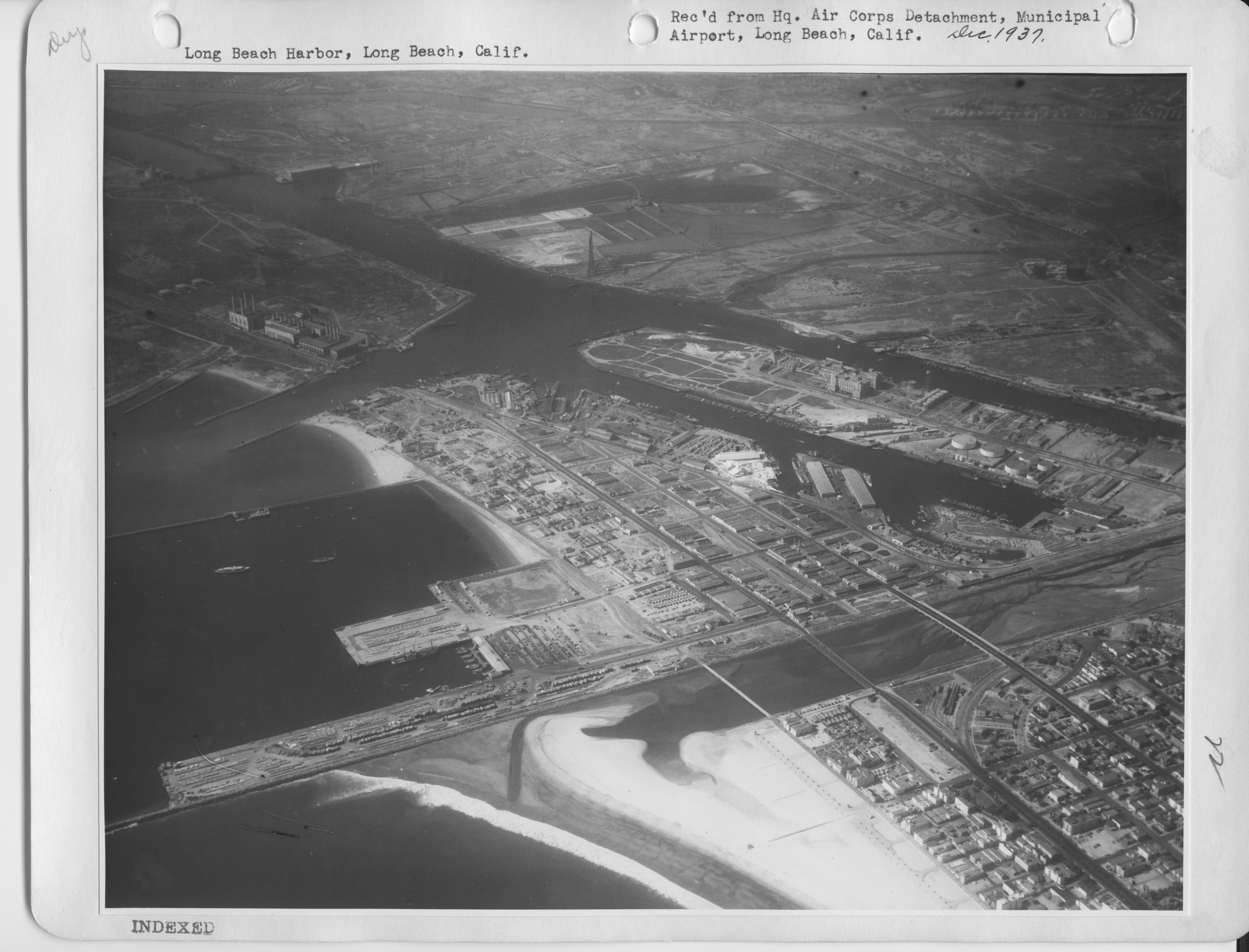
Bird's eye view of the Port of Long Beach in 1937

The former Long Beach Shipbuilding Company yard was the first Consolidated Steel facility to become operational. It was located at the entrance of Channel No. 3 on the south side (33.768916°N 118.215992°W).

On Liberty Fleet Day, September 27, 1941, the yard launched SS Alcoa Polaris, a C1-B type cargo vessel, as one of the fourteen ships launched nationwide on the same day to show the magnitude of the shipbuilding program.

- 18 of 95 C1-B
  - Agwimonte (MC-75), launched as Cape Mendocino 14 November 1940
  - Agwiprince (MC-76), launched 27 April 1941(or 27 March)
  - Alcoa Pennant (MC-77), launched 26 June 1941
  - Alcoa Polaris (MC-78), laid down 7 April 1941, launched 27 September 1941
  - ...the two P1 hulls were built during 1942...
  - Cape Trinity WH 30th ship (23 in W) launched 31 January 1943
  - Cape Sandy JH 6th C-1 launched 20 April 1943, Wilmington has launched 32 C1-B.
  - Cape Friendship JH, launched 29 May 1943
  - Cape Meredith WH launched 22 July 1943
  - Hope launched 30 August 1943
  - Cape Orange WH launched 22 October 1943, 12th ship launched at the yard
  - Cape Cumberland WH launched 11 December 1943
  - Cape Martin 88th total launched 24 January 1944
  - Cape John JH 15th ship launched 2 March 1944
  - Cape Lambert JH 16th ship launched on 9 April 1944
  - Cape Saunders JH launched 10 May 1944
  - Cape San Diego JH launched 15 June 1944
  - Cape Edmond JH 19th ship, 106th W+LB, launched 10 July 1944 (Cape Edmont)
  - Cape Spear JH
- Two type p1 passenger ships, model P1-S2-L2. The P1-S2-L2 Doyen-class attack transports were two ships. The first American assault military transports. Made with an aft ramp for the launching of small landing craft or for the unloading of tanks.
  - USS Doyen, first in class
  - USS Feland
- several C1-M
  - Diamond Knot, launched 28 September 1944
  - Lanyard Knot launched 18 December 1944
  - Jumper Hitch launched 30 December 1944
  - Square Knot launched 13 January 1945
  - Snug Hitch launched 27 January 1945
- several C1-M probable (WIlmington occupied)
  - Timber Hitch, launched 12 October 1944

== Maywood plant ==
On 26 June 1927 Union Iron Works formally opened the first unit of a new multi-million dollar plant on their 25-acre tract at Stauson and Garfield avenues (33.98220°N 118.14218°W).

26 July 1930, Consolidated Steel purchased 50 acre at NE corner of Eastern and Stauson avenues (33.98645°N 118.1613°W).

The Union, Baker and Llewellyn Iron Works were competitors prior to consolidation in the markets of steel fabrication and erection in the Los Angeles area.

In August 1930 plans were being implemented to erect the typical shops of a steel plant on the tract at Slauson and Eastern. The projected cost was $1,000,000 including machinery. Predecessor plants were to be dismantled and moved to the new location.

During World War II 761 Landing craft mechanized were constructed to completion in the plant and their motors and hull integrity tested on site in a large water tank.

Also built were 403 5-inch/38 twin mounts.

Consolidated built the first blast furnace of the Kaiser Fontana integrated mill in 1942.

In 1949 the plant was 60 acres in size with equipment for the manufacture and erection of heavy steel products. Including 26 to 36-inch welded pipe, structural steel for industrial and commercial buildings, bridges and railcar frames; cement kilns; penstocks; storage tanks (gas, oil, water, chemicals).

== After the war ==
Shortly after the end of the war, in September 1945, Consolidated Steel bought the assets of the Western Pipe and Steel Company of California, another wartime shipbuilding firm, for $6,217,373. The property consisted of main plants at South San Francisco and Vernon and small plants serving local industries in Taft, Fresno and Phoenix.

In October 1946 a shipyard on Manicani Island off the coast of Samar in the Philippines came under the control of Consolidated and Bechtel interests under the name of Philippine Consolidated Shipyards. Initial contracts from the U.S. Navy for conversion, repair and construction of small craft, which was completed in August 1947 after which Philippine Consolidated carried on with similar work in Manila and Cavite.

Going into the legal proceedings surrounding the planned acquisition by the Columbia Steel Company (a U.S. Steel subsidiary), at the beginning of the year 1947 Consolidated Steel owned and operated plants in Los Angeles, Vernon, Fresno, Berkeley and Taft in California, and in Phoenix, Arizona and Orange, Texas.

The company name was changed to Consolidated Western Steel Corp. on 1 July 1948. A separate company with the same name was incorporated in Delaware on 31 August 1948, marking the acquisition for $12,481,221 by U.S. Steel.

In January 1949, Consolidated was contracted to build a new blast furnace at the Kaiser Fontana steel mill. This was furnace #2, blown on October 13, 1949.

October 1949, construction is planned of a new pipe mill in Houston near the ship channel with a projected capacity of 50 miles of large diameter pipe per month. The project is cancelled, the mill is instead built in Orange, Texas. A general purpose plate shop and an 85x900 feet pipe mill became operational in March 1950. Also during that time the Orange plant was fabricating the large 34 feet, 10 inches diameter pipe sections for the Baytown Tunnel that crossed the Houston ship channel.

September 1949, Consolidated is applying for a certificate to operate in Pennsylvania to assist in the construction of a new welded pipe mill in McKeesport.

Effective 31 December 1951, in an internal corporate restructuring, the subsidiary corporation became the Consolidated Western Steel Division of the United States Steel Company with Alden G. Roach as president, who was also president of the newly formed Columbia-Geneva Steel Division.

In May 1955, a new pipe mill in Provo starts shipments for the Pacific Northwest Pipeline Corp.. The relocation of all pipeline operations to Utah was first announced in September 1954.

The small diameter pipe mill was moved from Berkeley to the new pipe plant at Provo after the large diameter portion had reached full production and the transfer was completed in January 1956.

20 December 1956, Alden G. Roach, the pilot and the co-pilot died in the crash of a company Lockheed Model 18 Lodestar near Tyrone, Pennsylvania.

During much of the 1950s, Consolidated was part of Project Nike, producing $146.2 million worth of launcher loaders, earning $9.3 million in profits. The first generation Nike-Ajax loaders were a Douglas Aircraft design, the enlarged Nike-Hercules loaders were Consolidated Western's design. Many thousands were produced at a price on the order of $20,000 to $30,000 each.

In March 1957 a design study for a heavy water reactor pressure vessel was released, prepared on behalf of the Atomic Energy Commission.

In 1964, in an internal corporate restructuring, the Consolidated Western Steel Division was merged with the American Bridge Division to form a single steel fabrication division within U.S. Steel (the American Bridge DIvision). Occurrences of the former name in the press dropped sharply at that point.

=== Line Pipe ===
Name	Location	From	To	Length	Diameters
Taxas-California	California	Blythe	Santa Fe Springs	214	30
Trans-Arabia	Saudi Arabia			980	30, 31
Transcontinental	United States			1840	
PG&E Super Inch	California	Topock	Milpitas		34
Kirkuk-Baniyas	Iraq and Syria	Kirkuk	Baniyas	490	30, 32
	California	Needles	Newhall	241	

In September 1946 production was to commence on 214 miles and 60,000 tons of 30-inch pipe for the Southern California Gas Company for a contract value of $6m. This 214 mile section between Blythe and Santa Fe Springs was the western section of the first of the El Paso Natural Gas Company's pipelines supplying California from natural gas fields in Texas. Steel plates were provided by the Geneva Steel mill. The pipeline became operational on 13 November 1947. The source material for the process was 30 feet long, 92 inch wide plates, the welded pipe segments were hydraulically expanded (i.e. cold formed) in a closed die, yielding very straight pipe of improved strength. The capacity of the plant in 1947 was 9 miles of pipe per week. Shipped pipes were 60 feet in length, 2 sections welded together at the factory.

In early 1947 Consolidated was contracted to provide 980 miles of pipe for the Bechtel-built Trans-Arabian Pipeline (oil), the National Tube Company of Pittsburgh (a U.S. Steel subsidiary) was to supply another 70 miles. A second production line was installed at the Maywood plant for the construction of 31-inch pipe, which made up 50% of the order and this allowed the volume of shipping and shipping costs be cut in half with one pipe segment stored inside one larger pipe segment. The Trans-Arabian Pipe Line Co. underwrote the cost to increase production capacity to 3 miles per day. The January 1949 issue of U.S. Steel News stated a capacity of 3.5 miles of pipe per day at the Maywood plant. The SS William Tllghman with the first load of pipes (a little more than 5 miles) departed Long Beach for Ras Tanura on 7 November 1947., followed by the SS George Chamberlain, SS Joplin Victory, SS William H. Kendrick, SS Kenyon Victory and others.

During delays caused by failure of Tapline to obtain export licenses, 30 and 31-inch pipe was diverted to the Tennessee Gas Transmission Co. to loop the 661 miles between Victoria, Texas and Cornwell, West Virginia laid in 1947 and 1948 with 204 miles of 30/31-inch loop line.

In January 1949 CWS began fabrication of 1840 miles of pipe for the Transcontinental Gas Pipe Line Company's Texas-New York pipeline (natural gas). (FPC Docket No. G-704, certificate issued 29 May 1948) The plates for this pipeline came from Kaiser Fontana. The Basalt Rock Company at Napa (Bay area) also turned Kaiser plates into pipe for that project. The Fontana mill was making plates at an approximate rate of 20,000 tons per month for Consolidated in late 1949.

June 1949, contracts are awarded for Pacific Gas and Electric's 34-inch "Super-Inch" Pipe Line (natural gas) from Topock to Milpitas. Ditching started June 29, 1949 for the 80-mile section between Llanda (near Hollister) and Milpitas, which was to be used as an underground storage reservoir until completion of the whole line, to be ready for the 1949/1950 winter season. The pipe segments were produced in South San Francisco and joined in pairs or if conditions permitted in groups of three at a depot near Santa Clara. The depot was then moved to Barstow in late 1949 or early 1950 when the northern leg was about completed. Stockpiling began for the ensuing completion of the pipe, which started from the Arizona border at Topock, heading west.

September 1950, construction to begin on 30-inch pipe for the Kirkuk–Baniyas oil pipeline, which was to loop the existing 12-inch and 16-inch lines of the Kirkuk–Haifa oil pipeline. Diameters of 30 and 32 inches. Plates fabricated by Geneva Steel. First first shipment sails on 30 September 1950, Construction by Bechtel commenced in November 1950, shortly after the completion of the Trans-Arabia. Last shipment leaves the Port of Los Angeles February 1952 aboard the SS Day Beam. The line went into operation in April 1952.

August 1952, fabrication of parts of a 953-mile 24-inch crude oil pipeline from Wink, Texas to Norwalk, California to begin in a few months.

Consolidated was contracted for 20 miles of 30-inch pipe for an expansion of the California portion of the Texas Pipeline (natural gas) in November 1952, the project expected to be finished in March 1953.

The Provo pipe mill produced 241 miles of 30-inch pipe to be laid in the first half of 1957 between Needles and Newhall, Pacific Lightning Corp subsidiaries (conjecture: SoCalGas), total project cost $24,000,000.

== Baker Iron Works ==
The Baker Iron Works had its start at Los Angeles, California, about 1874, when Milo Stannard Baker (1828–1894) acquired a small machine shop there. The business, begun on a small scale as M.S. Baker & Company, grew quite rapidly. A much larger facility was erected in 1886 and in June of that year the business was incorporated as the Baker Iron Works with capital stock of $75,000. Five directors were named: Milo S. Baker, E.H. Booth, Charles F. Kimball, Fred L. Baker (Milo's son), and H.T. Neuree. Less than a year later, Baker erected a $15,000 building on Buena Vista Street near College.

Baker Iron Works had a great many different products, manufacturing mining, milling, pumping, hoisting, oil and well drilling machinery, streetcars, boilers, oven and heating furnaces, as well as a line of architectural iron. It seems to have been especially noteworthy for steam boiler fabrication, installation and maintenance. According to one authority, in 1889 Baker produced the first locomotive built in Los Angeles, designed by Milo's son Fred, vice president of the firm.

Another authority says Baker built horse cars and perhaps street cars for Los Angeles, Pasadena and other communities in the Los Angeles area and that they built some larger cars for the Santa Ana & Orange Motor Road in 1898. According to this authority, after Pacific Electric bought this line, the cars were revamped and continued in service until 1920. It is claimed that in the early 1890s, Street Railway Journal reportedly ranked Baker "among the principal car builders on the Pacific Coast."

In 1887, Baker constructed six street cars for the City & Central Street Railway.

According to an article in the 1 January 1890 issue of the Los Angeles Times, the Baker Works then occupied some 25,000 square feet (2,300 m^{2}) and provided employment to 75 men. A large variety of manufacturing was being done. The foundry was making iron and brass castings to fit nearly all kinds of machinery for mining and milling purposes, besides pumping plants for large and small waterworks, and steam plants for all the variety of uses to which steam was put. They manufactured their own boilers. They were also manufacturing oil-boring tools and rigs, and constructing elevators—both passenger and freight—in all varieties: hydraulic steam or hand. It was claimed by the newspaper that Baker had installed nearly all the first class passenger elevators in Southern California. The article said they manufacture street-cars and did other railroad work to order and claimed to make the best gang plows and road and field rollers that could be obtained anywhere. They also installed heating and ventilating plants for public buildings, both steam, hot water and hot air. And they did architectural iron-work. Milo S. Baker was then president, J.E. Sills was vice-president and treasurer, and Fred L. Baker (Milo's son) was secretary and plant superintendent.

In 1891, Baker was awarded the contract to build the Santa Ana Water Works. In six months, for a total price of $58,000, Baker put in nine miles (14 km) of street mains, sixty fire hydrants and gates valves, one reservoir 10×78×78 feet (3.0×23.8×23.8 m), build one fire-proof power house, two sixty-horsepower (45 kW) boilers and brick stock, two 10 by 16 by 10 1/2 by 10 feet (3.0 m × 4.9 m × 3.2 m × 3.0 m) compound condensing engines of 2,060,000 US gallons (7,800 m^{3}) capacity every 24 hours, All this complete and functioning: truly a "turn-key" operation. {109}

After the turn of the 20th century, Baker seems to have specialized in steel fabrication and elevator building. Fred L. Baker headed the company as president after his father's death. Over the next 30 years they did the steel work and/or elevators for—among many others— Los Angeles' first skyscraper, the twelve-storey Union Trust Building, the Public Service Building, the Queen of Angels Hospital, the YWCA Hotel, the United Artists-California Petroleum Building, the University of California at Westwood, The Masonic Temple at Glendale, the Los Angeles-First National Bank at Glendale, the Los Angeles-First National Bank at Hollywood and the University of Redlands at Redlands.

Erection of the Hotel Alexandria from prefabricated materials.

Fred L. Baker acted as president of the Los Angeles Shipbuilding and Dry Dock Company. The keels for the first three ships hastily laid down in the yard in July 1917 were fabricated in the Baker Iron Works shops.

Baker had a machine shop on North Broadway near Castelar street (34.06403°N 118.23864°W).

== See also ==
- California during World War II
- Maritime history of California
