= USS Clarendon =

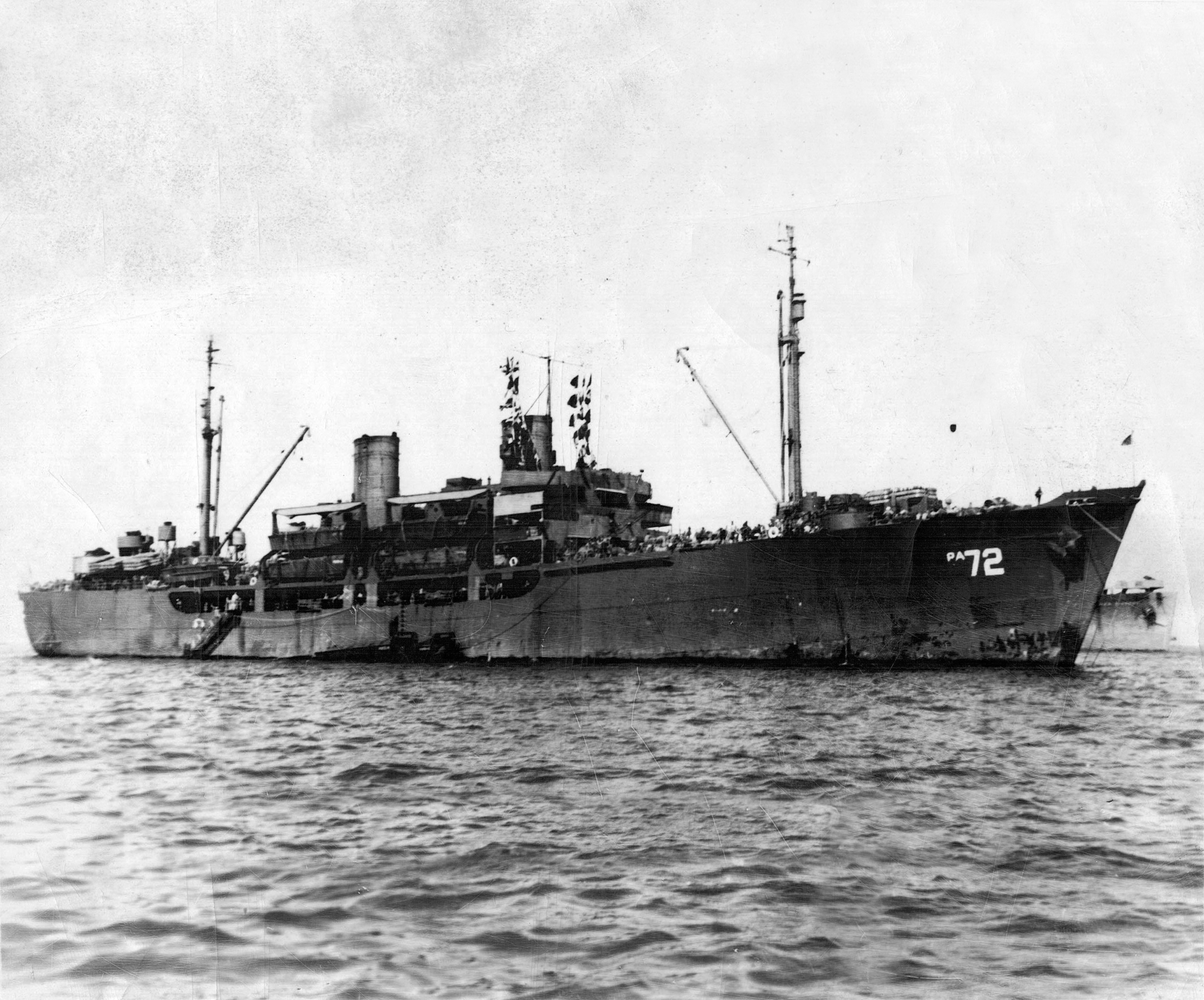

History

United States
- Name: USS Clarendon (APA-72)
- Namesake: Clarendon County, South Carolina
- Builder: Consolidated Steel
- Launched: 12 September 1944
- Sponsored by: Mrs T. May
- Acquired: 14 December 1944
- Commissioned: 14 December 1944
- Decommissioned: 9 April 1946
- Fate: Scrapped 16 October 1964

General characteristics
- Class & type: Gilliam-class attack transport
- Displacement: 4,247 tons (lt), 7,080 t.(fl)
- Length: 426 ft (130 m)
- Beam: 58 ft (18 m)
- Draft: 16 ft (4.9 m)
- Propulsion: Westinghouse turboelectric drive, 2 boilers, 2 propellers, Design shaft horsepower 6,000
- Speed: 17 knots
- Capacity: 47 Officers, 802 Enlisted
- Crew: 27 Officers, 295 Enlisted
- Armament: 1 x 5"/38 caliber dual-purpose gun mount, 4 x twin 40mm gun mounts, 10 x single 20mm gun mounts
- Notes: MCV Hull No. ?, hull type S4-SE2-BD1

USS Clarendon (APA-72) was a Gilliam-class attack transport that served with the United States Navy from 1944 to 1946. She was scrapped in 1964.

== History ==
Clarendon was named after a county in South Carolina. She was launched 12 September 1944 by Consolidated Steel at Wilmington, California, under a Maritime Commission contract; commissioned 14 December 1944; and reported to the Pacific Fleet. Clarendon sailed from San Diego 6 February 1945 to join amphibious exercises in the Hawaiian Islands, then sailed for Ulithi, where late in March she joined the escort of a convoy to voyage to Saipan.

=== Invasion of Okinawa ===
Returning to Ulithi, she put to sea 22 April to carry combat cargo to Okinawa, off which she lay to discharge 26 to 30 April. On the 28th, she drove away enemy aircraft with her intensive gunfire.

Returning to the west coast 22 May 1945, Clarendon made three voyages from San Diego and San Francisco to Pearl Harbor, carrying passengers and cargo in both directions. On 29 July she got underway from San Francisco.

=== Post-war ===
Clarendon called at Eniwetok, Ulithi, Manila, and put into Tokyo 13 September. She carried troops for the occupation of Japan and in the redeployment of forces in China until 15 November, when she sailed from Taku to load homeward bound troops at Samar, Guam, Saipan, and Iwo Jima on her way to San Pedro, where she arrived 18 December.

=== Decommissioning ===
In January 1946 she sailed north to Seattle, where she was decommissioned 9 April 1946, and transferred to the War Shipping Administration in June 1946. She was scrapped by Zidell, Portland, OR; scrapping completed 16 October 1964.

== Decorations ==
Clarendon received one battle star for World War II service.
