= USS Cortland =

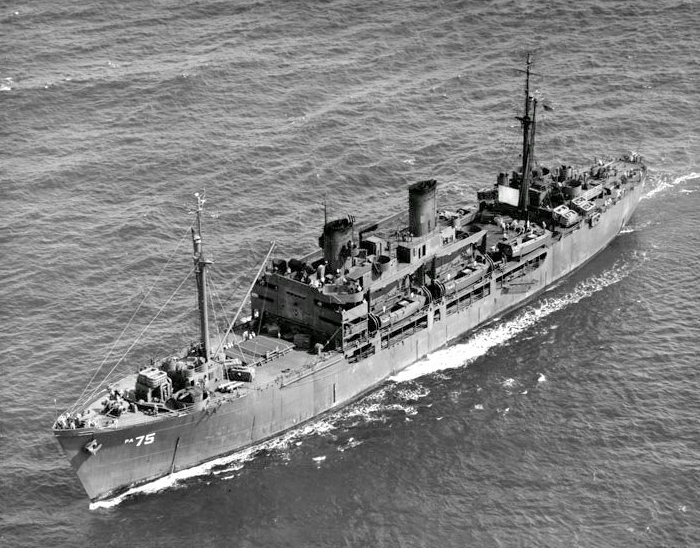

History

United States
- Name: USS Cortland (APA-75)
- Namesake: Cortland County, New York
- Builder: Consolidated Steel
- Launched: 18 October 1944
- Sponsored by: Mrs. D. O'Melveny
- Acquired: 31 December 1944
- Commissioned: 1 January 1945
- Decommissioned: 30 December 1946
- Fate: Scrapped August of 1966

General characteristics
- Class & type: Gilliam-class attack transport
- Displacement: 4,247 tons (lt), 7,080 t.(fl)
- Length: 426 ft (130 m)
- Beam: 58 ft (18 m)
- Draft: 16 ft (4.9 m)
- Propulsion: Westinghouse turboelectric drive, 2 boilers, 2 propellers, Design shaft horsepower 6,000
- Speed: 17 knots
- Capacity: 47 Officers, 802 Enlisted
- Crew: 27 Officers, 295 Enlisted
- Armament: 1 x 5"/38 caliber dual-purpose gun mount, 4 x twin 40 mm gun mounts, 10 x single 20 mm gun mounts
- Notes: MCV Hull No. 1868, hull type S4-SE-BD1

USS Cortland (APA-75) was a Gilliam-class attack transport that served with the US Navy during World War II. Commissioned late in the war, she was initially assigned to transport duties and consequently did not participate in combat operations.

Cortland was named after Cortland County, New York. She was launched 18 October 1944 by Consolidated Steel at Wilmington, California, under a Maritime Commission contract; acquired by the Navy 31 December; and commissioned 1 January 1945.

== Operational history ==
=== World War II ===
==== Attempted Sabotage ====
While Cortland was being outfitted at San Pedro on 5 January 1945, her watch apprehended beneath the pier a prowler who upon investigation proved to be a German spy. His avowed mission was to damage the ship with explosives which he had dropped overboard when caught.

==== Training and transport duties ====
Cortland completed her outfit and shakedown uneventfully and sailed to Seattle to embark Army troops, clearing 1 March for training operations in the Hawaiian Islands. She returned to San Francisco on 4 June for repairs, then embarked Army troops at Seattle and sailed 24 June for Okinawa where she disembarked her passengers and cargo 12 August.

==== After hostilities ====
She put out from Okinawa 26 September 1945 to land Marines at Tianjin for the reoccupation of northern China, then sailed by way of Manila to lift Chinese troops from Hong Kong to Qinhuangdao and Qingdao for the reoccupation of Manchuria, in two voyages between 25 October and 25 November.

Arriving at Sasebo 30 November, Cortland embarked homeward-bound troops and sailed 7 December for San Diego, arriving 23 December for overall.

=== Operation Crossroads ===
Cortland carried Marines from the Hawaiians to San Diego between 19 January and 4 February 1946, then sailed from San Pedro 24 February to operate under JTF-1 in Operation Crossroads, the atomic weapons tests in the Marshalls. Returning to San Francisco 13 September, she remained there until 5 November when she sailed for New York and Norfolk, arriving 5 December.

=== Decommission ===
Cortland was decommissioned 30 December 1946 and transferred to the Maritime Commission for disposal 31 March 1948. Cortland was scrapped August 1966 by Boston Metals Company.
