= USS Banner (APA-60) =

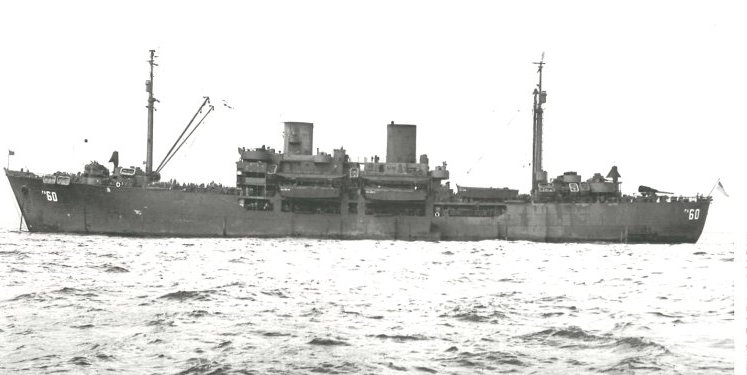
- USS Banner (APA-60) at anchor off the Naval Repair Base, San Diego, California, 27 October 1945

History

United States
- Name: USS Banner
- Namesake: Banner County, Nebraska
- Builder: Consolidated Steel
- Launched: 3 May 1944
- Sponsored by: Miss Grace Henley
- Acquired: 15 September 1944
- Commissioned: 16 September 1944
- Decommissioned: 27 August 1946
- Honours and awards: Two battle stars for World War II service
- Fate: Scuttled off Kwajalein 16 February 1948 after use as a target in Operation Crossroads

General characteristics
- Class & type: Gilliam-class attack transport
- Displacement: 4,247 tons (lt), 7,080 t.(fl)
- Length: 426 ft (130 m)
- Beam: 58 ft (18 m)
- Draft: 16 ft (4.9 m)
- Propulsion: Westinghouse turboelectric drive, 2 boilers, 2 propellers, Design shaft horsepower 6,000
- Speed: 16.9 knots
- Capacity: 47 Officers, 802 Enlisted
- Crew: 27 Officers, 295 Enlisted
- Armament: 1 x 5"/38 caliber dual-purpose gun mount, 4 x twin 40mm gun mounts, 10 x single 20mm gun mounts
- Notes: MCV Hull No. ?, hull type S4-SE2-BD1

USS Banner (APA-60) was a Gilliam-class attack transport that served with the United States Navy from 1944 to 1946. She was scuttled in 1948.

== History ==
Banner was launched 3 May 1944 by the Consolidated Steel Corporation at Wilmington, California, under a Maritime Commission contract; acquired from the Maritime Commission 15 September, and commissioned 16 September 1944 in Long Beach, California with James R. Pace, LCDR in command. The USS Banner then reported to the Pacific Fleet. Pace later retired from the United States Naval Reserve with the rank of Rear Admiral.

=== World War II ===
Banner loaded cargo and passengers and got underway from the west coast 30 October 1944, putting into Milne Bay, New Guinea, 17 November. Until 30 December 1944 she carried passengers and cargo between Humboldt Bay, Hollandia, and Cape Sansapor, New Guinea. On the 30th she departed Cape Sansapor in company with TG 78.5 en route to Lingayen Gulf, Luzon, Philippine Islands.

She arrived in Lingayen Gulf 9 January 1945 and on the next day she successfully unloaded her cargo. On 11 January she departed for Leyte, Philippine Islands, arriving 14 January 1945. Arriving at Seeadler Harbor, Manus Island, Admiralty Islands, 24 January, she departed the following day for Maffin Bay, New Guinea where she hurriedly took on troops and cargo and departed for Humboldt Bay, New Guinea, arriving 29 January.

==== Invasion of Okinawa ====
She departed for Leyte 14 February 1945, arriving 20 February. She then debarked her passengers; loaded to capacity with cargo and troops; and got underway 27 March for the invasion of Okinawa, where she unloaded her troops and cargo between 1 and 5 April.

On 5 April she departed for the west coast, via Guam and Pearl Harbor, arriving at San Francisco 11 May. Loaded with troops and cargo she departed 19 May and anchored at Leyte 10 June. She departed Leyte 19 June and sailed via Oro Bay and Humboldt Bay, New Guinea to the west coast, arriving at San Francisco 3 August.

=== After hostilities ===
She departed 27 August for Okinawa, via Eniwetok, arriving 19 September. After loading 976 troops for transportation to the United States, she departed 27 September 1945.

=== Operation Crossroads ===
Banner continued on transport duty until February 1946 when she was assigned as a target vessel for Operation Crossroads, the atomic bomb tests at Bikini Atoll. She underwent preparation for the exercise at San Pedro, California, and Pearl Harbor until 15 May 1946 when she departed for the Marshall Islands.

Arriving at Bikini Atoll on the 28th, she was used as a target vessel during the atomic tests of July and August. Banner was decommissioned 27 August 1946 and scuttled off Kwajalein 16 February 1948.

=== Decorations ===
Banner received two battle stars for her World War II service.
