= USS Cleburne =

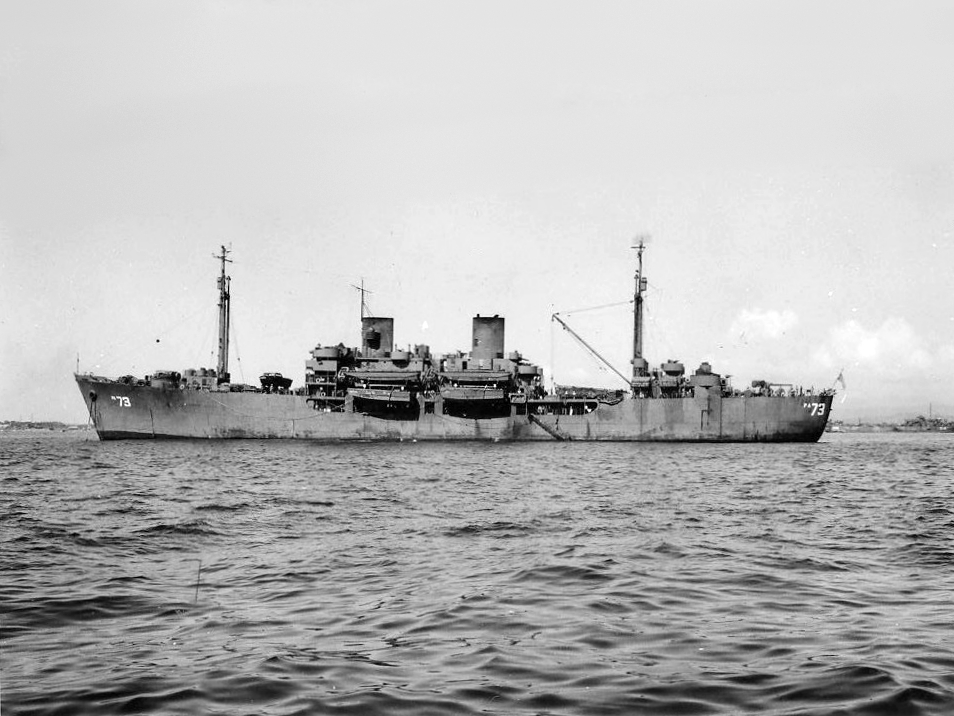

History

United States
- Name: USS Cleburne (APA-73)
- Namesake: Cleburne County, Arkansas; Cleburne County, Alabama
- Builder: Consolidated Steel
- Launched: 27 September 1944
- Sponsored by: Mrs J. E. Trainer
- Acquired: 21 December 1944
- Commissioned: 22 December 1944
- Decommissioned: 7 June 1946
- Fate: Scrapped in 1965

General characteristics
- Class & type: Gilliam-class attack transport
- Displacement: 4,247 tons (lt), 7,080 t.(fl)
- Length: 426 ft (130 m)
- Beam: 58 ft (18 m)
- Draft: 16 ft (4.9 m)
- Propulsion: Westinghouse turboelectric drive, 2 boilers, 2 propellers, Design shaft horsepower 6,000
- Speed: 17 knots
- Capacity: 47 Officers, 802 Enlisted
- Crew: 27 Officers, 295 Enlisted
- Armament: 1 x 5"/38 caliber dual-purpose gun mount, 4 x twin 40mm gun mounts, 10 x single 20mm gun mounts
- Notes: MCV Hull No. ?, hull type S4-SE2-BD1

USS Cleburne (APA-73) was a Gilliam-class attack transport that served with the United States Navy from 1944 to 1946. She was scrapped in 1965.

== History ==
Cleburne was named after counties in Arkansas and Alabama. She was launched 27 September 1944 by Consolidated Steel at Wilmington, California, under a Maritime Commission contract; acquired by the Navy 21 December 1944; and commissioned the next day.

=== World War II ===
From 12 February 1945 to 10 June, Cleburne made two voyages from west coast ports to conduct training in the Hawaiian Islands, returning each time with passengers and hospital patients. She sailed from San Francisco 28 June to transfer troops in the western Pacific, calling at Eniwetok, Guam, Ulithi, Okinawa, ports in the Philippines, and Jinsen, Korea. During this time the war ended.

=== Post-war ===
Cleburne arrived at Portland, Oregon, from the Far East 13 November. On 7 December she sailed to carry men to Shanghai and Qingdao, China, returning to San Francisco 13 February 1946.

=== Operation Crossroads ===
Cleburne arrived at Pearl Harbor 1 March 1946, and there was decommissioned 7 June 1946. After use in Operation Crossroads, the atomic weapons tests at Bikini Atoll, she was towed to San Francisco and transferred to the Maritime Commission 7 July 1947. She was sold for scrap in June 1965.
