= USS Dawson =

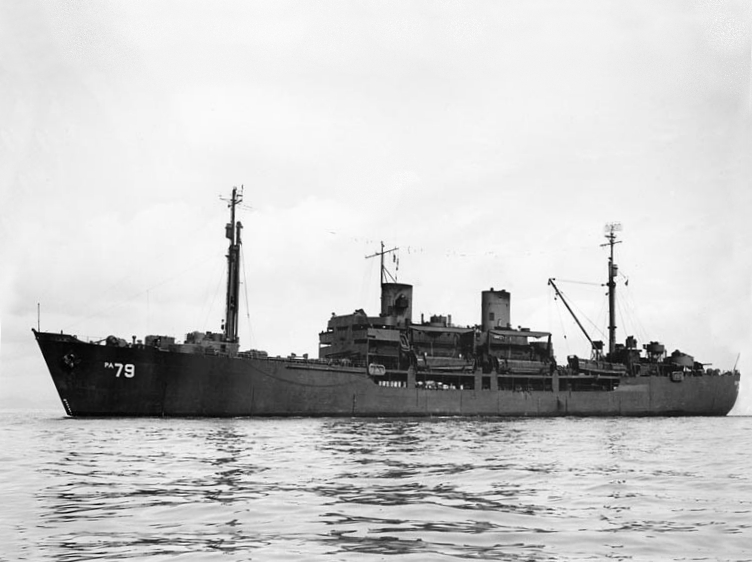
- USS Dawson (APA-79) underway in San Francisco Bay in late 1945 or early 1946

History

United States
- Name: USS Dawson (APA-79)
- Namesake: Dawson County, Georgia; Dawson County, Montana; Dawson County, Nebraska; Dawson County, Texas
- Builder: Consolidated Steel
- Launched: 27 November 1944
- Sponsored by: Mrs. P. Hotchkis
- Acquired: 3 February 1945
- Commissioned: 4 February 1945
- Decommissioned: 20 September 1946
- Fate: Sunk as target by USS Helena (CA-75), 19 April 1948

General characteristics
- Class & type: Gilliam-class attack transport
- Displacement: 4,247 tons (lt), 7,080 t.(fl)
- Length: 426 ft (130 m)
- Beam: 58 ft (18 m)
- Draft: 16 ft (4.9 m)
- Propulsion: Westinghouse turboelectric drive, 2 boilers, 2 propellers, Design shaft horsepower 6,000
- Speed: 17 knots
- Capacity: 47 Officers, 802 Enlisted
- Crew: 27 Officers, 295 Enlisted
- Armament: 1 x 5"/38 caliber dual-purpose gun mount, 4 x twin 40 mm gun mounts, 10 x single 20 mm gun mounts
- Notes: MCV Hull No. 1872, hull type S4-SE2-BD1

USS Dawson (APA-79) was a Gilliam-class attack transport that served with the US Navy during World War II. Commissioned late in the war, she was initially assigned to transport duties and consequently did not participate in combat operations.

Dawson (APA-79) was named after counties in Georgia, Montana, Nebraska, and Texas. She was launched 27 November 1944 by Consolidated Steel at Wilmington, California, under a Maritime Commission contract; transferred to the Navy 3 February 1945; and commissioned the next day.

== Operational history ==
=== World War II ===
Clearing San Francisco 3 April 1945, Dawson carried passengers and cargo to Espiritu Santo, Tulagi, and Nouméa before arriving at Brisbane, Australia, 6 May to reload. On 14 May she got underway for the Philippines and until the end of the war, carried men and equipment of construction battalions from Manus and New Guinea.

==== After hostilities ====
Dawson embarked occupation troops at Pearl Harbor from 18 August to 1 September 1945, landing them at Sasebo 22 September. Four days later she was en route to transport additional troops to Japan, returning to Sasebo 14 October.

==== Operation Magic Carpet ====
Assigned to "Magic Carpet" duty carrying veterans eligible for discharge home to the west coast she departed Sasebo 22 October and embarked Army Air Corps personnel at Saipan, arriving at San Francisco 14 November.

=== Operation Crossroads ===
Following another voyage to the Western Pacific between 30 November 1945 and 16 January 1946, carried sailors from Guam to San Francisco, arrived San Francisco 30 January 1945. Then she was assigned as a test target to Operation Crossroads, the atomic weapons tests in the Marshall Islands.

=== Decommission ===
After Operation Crossroads, Dawson was towed to Kwajalein where she was decommissioned 20 September 1946. She was retained there for radiological study until sunk by gunfire from USS Helena (CA-75) on 19 April 1948.
