= USS Cullman =

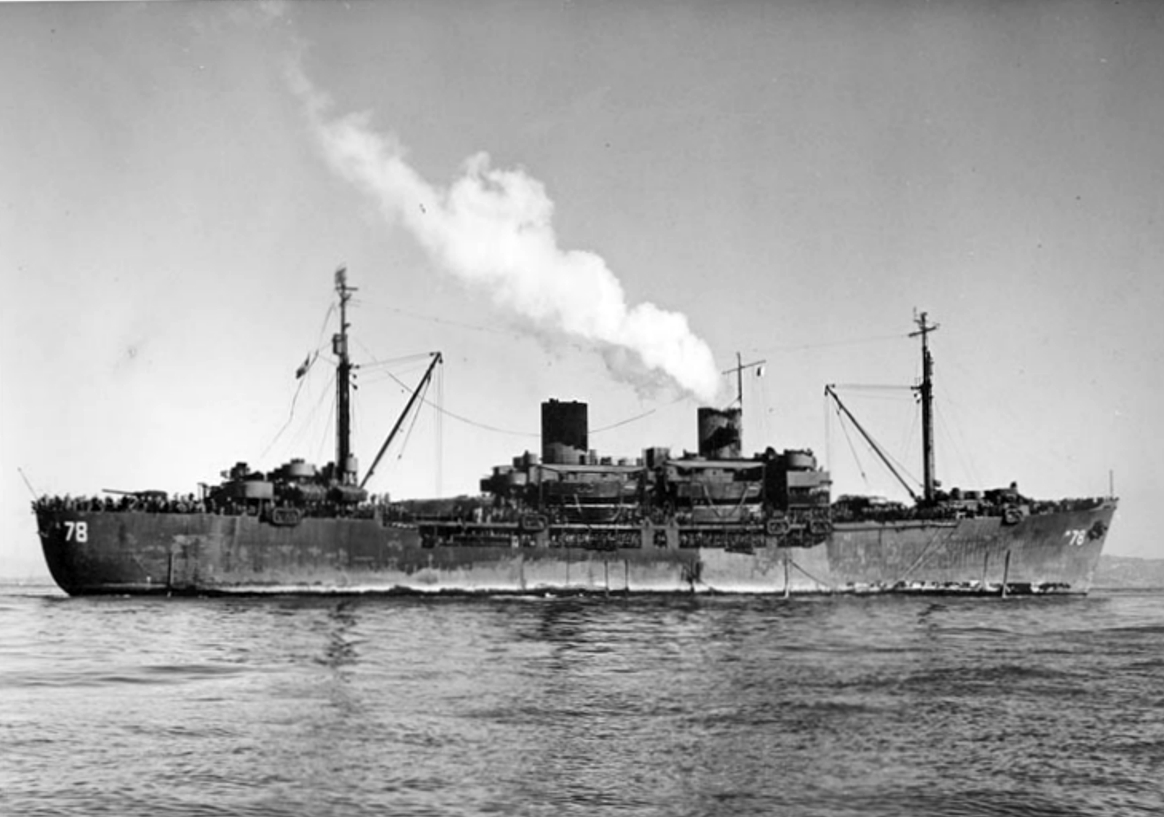
- USS Cullman underway in San Francisco Bay, California, late 1945 or early 1946, bringing home troops in Operation Magic Carpet

History

United States
- Name: USS Cullman
- Namesake: Cullman County, Alabama
- Builder: Consolidated Steel
- Launched: 17 November 1944
- Sponsored by: Mrs. G. E. Kenyon
- Acquired: 24 January 1944
- Commissioned: 25 January 1945
- Decommissioned: 22 May 1946
- Identification: APA-78
- Fate: Sold for scrap, August 1965

General characteristics
- Class & type: Gilliam-class attack transport
- Displacement: 4,247 tons (lt), 7,080 t.(fl)
- Length: 426 ft (130 m)
- Beam: 58 ft (18 m)
- Draft: 16 ft (4.9 m)
- Propulsion: Westinghouse turboelectric drive, 2 boilers, 2 propellers, Design shaft horsepower 6,000
- Speed: 16.9 knots (31.3 km/h; 19.4 mph)
- Capacity: 47 officers, 802 enlisted
- Crew: 27 officers, 295 enlisted
- Armament: 1 x 5"/38 caliber dual-purpose gun mount; 4 x twin 40 mm gun mounts; 10 x single 20 mm gun mounts
- Notes: MCV hull No. ?, hull type S4-SE2-BD1

USS Cullman (APA-78) was a Gilliam-class attack transport that served with the United States Navy from 1945 to 1946. She was scrapped in 1965.

== History ==
Cullman was named after a county in Alabama. She was launched 17 November 1944 by Consolidated Steel at Wilmington, Los Angeles, under a Maritime Commission contract; transferred to the navy 24 January 1945; and commissioned the next day.

Departing San Francisco 23 March 1945, Cullman arrived at Pearl Harbor 29 March and operated in training and inter-island transport duties until 6 July when she sailed for San Diego. Embarking troops and cargo, Cullman sailed 20 July for calls at Eniwetok and Ulithi on her way to Batangas Bay, Luzon, arriving shortly after the end of hostilities on 20 August. She loaded occupation troops, landed her army passengers at Tokyo Bay from 2 to 4 September, and arrived at Okinawa 7 September.

=== Transporting occupation troops ===
Cullman made one voyage to Guam, then landed US Marines at Taku Bar, China, for the reoccupation of northern China between 30 September and 6 October. Sailing by way of Manila, she lifted Chinese troops from Hong Kong to Taku and Qingdao in two voyages from 24 October to 21 November.

=== Operation Magic Carpet ===
Cullman then joined Operation Magic Carpet, the giant operation tasked with bringing returning servicemen home to the United States for discharge. She embarked homeward-bound servicemen at Manila for San Francisco, arriving 16 December 1945. She made a second voyage to Okinawa between 10 January and 15 February 1946.

=== Decommissioning ===
Cullman then returned to San Francisco where she was decommissioned on 22 May 1946 and transferred to the War Shipping Administration 30 June 1946 for disposal. She was sold for scrap in August 1965.
