= USS Butte (APA-68) =

American Naval warship

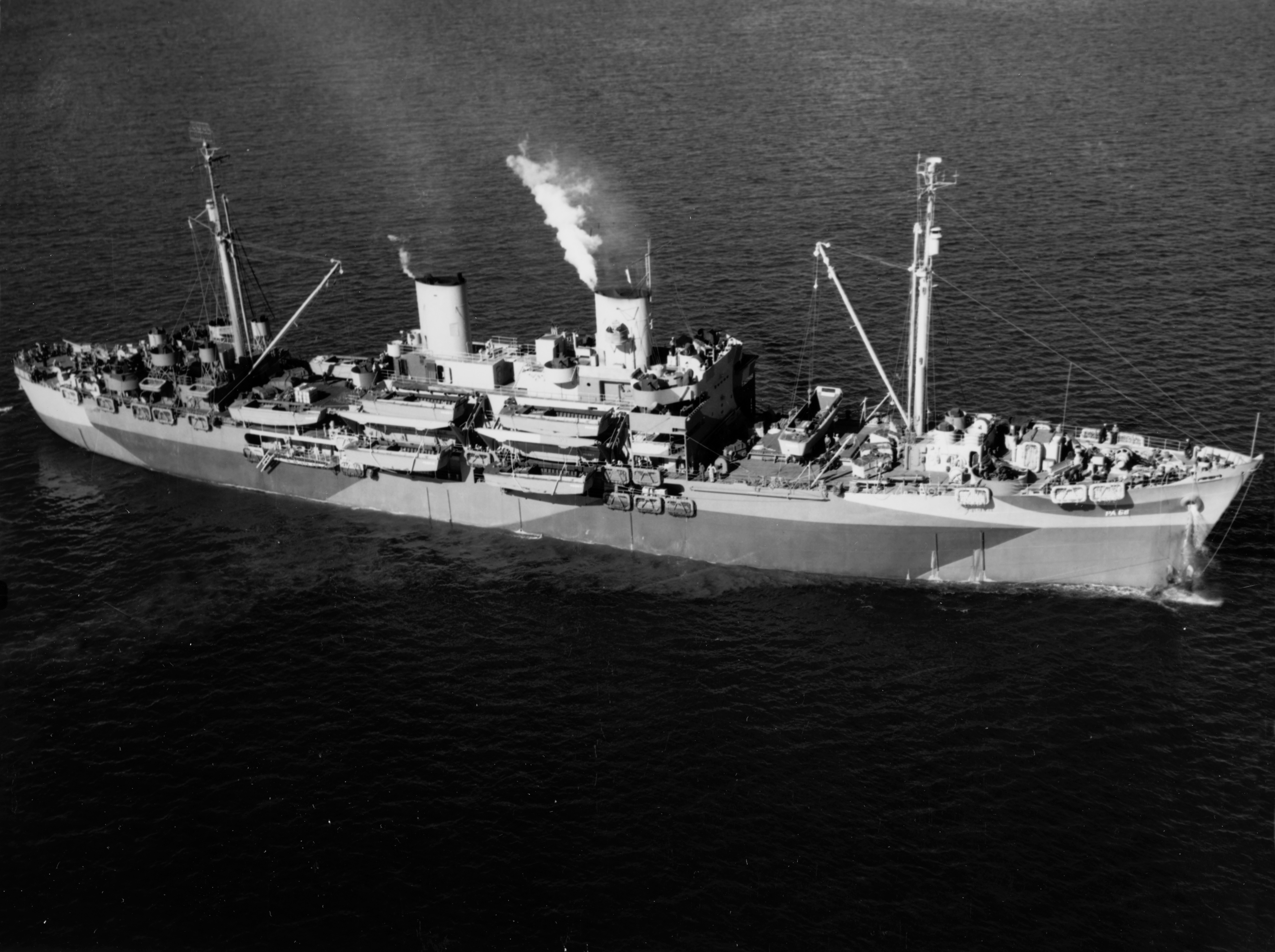
- Butte on 3 December 1944

History

United States
- Name: USS Butte
- Namesake: Butte County, California; Butte County, Idaho; Butte County, South Dakota
- Builder: Consolidated Steel Corporation, Wilmington, Los Angeles
- Launched: 20 July 1944
- Commissioned: 21 November 1944
- Stricken: 28 May 1948
- Honors and awards: 1 battle star (World War II)
- Fate: Sunk as a target, 12 May 1948

General characteristics
- Class & type: Gilliam-class attack transport
- Displacement: 4,247 long tons (4,315 t)
- Length: 426 ft (130 m)
- Beam: 58 ft (18 m)
- Draft: 16 ft (4.9 m)
- Speed: 16.9 knots (31.3 km/h; 19.4 mph)
- Complement: 283
- Armament: • 1 single 5"/38 cal dual purpose gun mount 4 twin 40mm AA radar-directed gun mounts 10 single 20mm AA gun mounts

USS Butte (APA-68) was a Gilliam-class attack transport serving in the United States Navy from 1944 to 1946. She was sunk as a target in 1948.

== History ==
USS Butte was launched on 20 July 1944 by Consolidated Steel Corporation, Wilmington, Los Angeles, under a Maritime Commission contract; sponsored by Mrs. Thomas W. Mearns; acquired on 21 November 1944; and commissioned the next day. Butte was named for counties in California, Idaho, and South Dakota.

Following shakedown training along the California coast, Butte embarked troops at San Diego, California, and, on 5 January 1945, got underway for the western Pacific. En route to the Philippines, Butte made stops of varying duration at Pearl Harbor, Eniwetok, Saipan, Ulithi, and in the Palau Islands. She arrived at Leyte on 21 February and began five weeks of training in preparation for the amphibious assault on Okinawa in the Ryukyu Islands. On 27 March, Butte set sail for Okinawa as a unit of Task Group (TG) 55.1 of the Southern Attack Force (Task Force (TF) 55) with elements of the Army's 7th Infantry Division embarked. She arrived off the objective early in the morning of 1 April – the day the assault was launched. During the next two weeks, Butte disembarked her troops and helped to repel air attacks, both conventional and kamikaze. On one occasion, two of her crewmen suffered wounds, but the ship escaped damage.

On 14 April, Butte departed the Ryukyus with Okinawa wounded embarked. The ship made brief stops at Saipan, Ulithi, and in the Palaus before arriving at Leyte on 24 April. Five days later, she returned to sea to begin making the passenger circuit among the various islands of the western Pacific. Her last port of call in the western Pacific was Eniwetok from which she took departure on 5 June. Butte made an overnight stop at Pearl Harbor on 11 June and then resumed her voyage to the west coast. She reached San Francisco on 18 June. On 21 June, the Butte shaped a course for Seattle, Washington. She stayed at Seattle from 23 June to 8 July.

On 8 July, Butte stood out of Seattle to return to the western Pacific. She made a short visit at Eniwetok on 21 and 22 July then continued on to Ulithi where she remained from 25 July to 8 August. From Ulithi, Butte moved on to her true destination, Okinawa, and arrived there on 12 August. Three days later, hostilities ceased; and the Japanese surrendered formally on 2 September. On 5 September, Butte put to sea from Okinawa carrying occupation troops to Korea. She arrived at Jinsen, Korea, on 8 September and remained there until 13 September. The ship returned to Okinawa on 18 September towing another transport crippled by a floating mine in the East China Sea. After 11 days at Okinawa, Butte shaped a course for northern China on 26 September carrying another complement of occupation troops. She arrived at Taku, China, on 30 September and remained there until 5 October. From Taku, the ship headed for Manila in the Philippines and an eight-day liberty call.

On 23 October, she laid in a course back to China. Arriving at Kowloon, near Hong Kong, on 25 October, she embarked Chinese Nationalist troops for passage to northern China where the Chinese Communists were on the advance. Butte disembarked her first contingent of Chinese soldiers at Qinhuangdao between 31 October and 2 November. She returned to Kowloon on 8 November and took additional Nationalist troops on board. The ship departed Kowloon on 10 November and arrived in Qingdao on 15 November. Later that month, she embarked homeward-bound American servicemen and shaped a course for the west coast of the United States.

Butte arrived in the United States on 18 December 1945 and, after repairs, was ordered to Pearl Harbor on 23 February 1946 for assignment to JTF 1. She served as a unit of the target group for "Operation Crossroads". She survived the atomic bomb tests and was retained for structural and radiation study at Kwajalein until 12 May 1948 when she was disposed of by sinking. Her name was struck from the Navy list on 28 May 1948.

USS Butte (APA-68) earned one battle star during World War II.
