= USS Fergus =

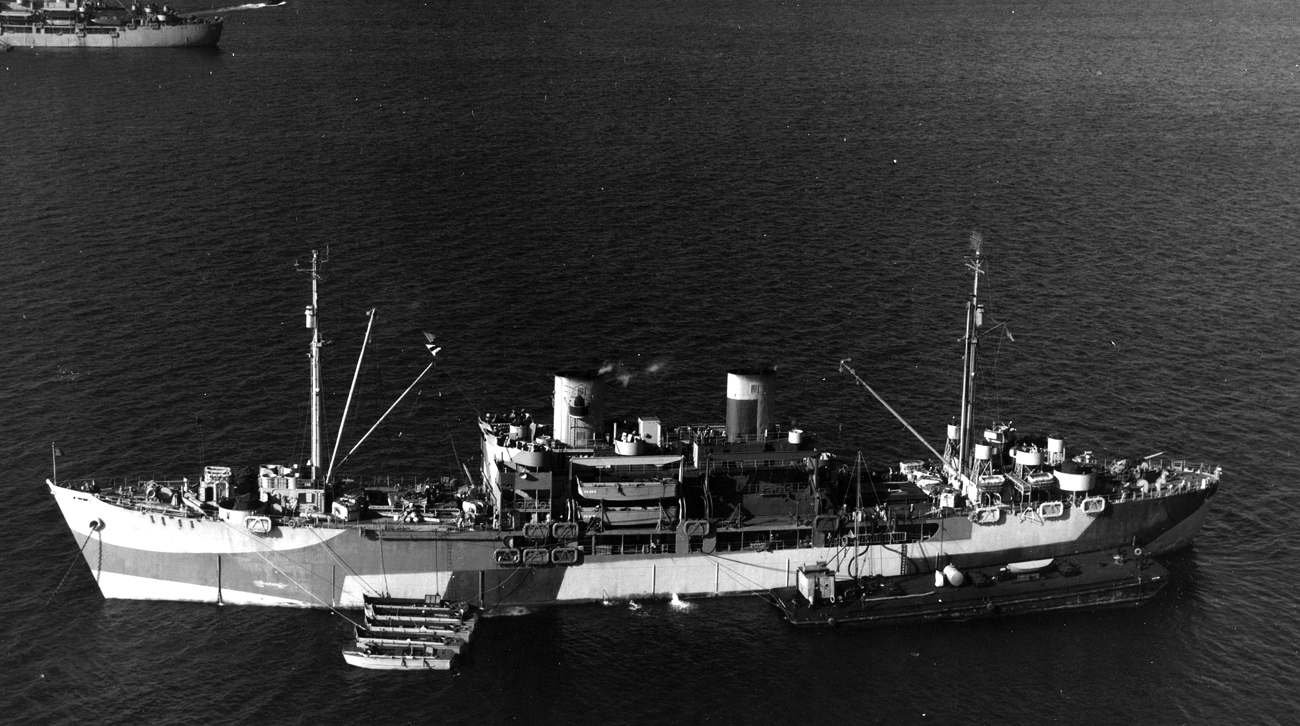

History

United States
- Name: USS Fergus (APA-82)
- Namesake: Fergus County, Montana
- Builder: Consolidated Steel
- Launched: 24 December 1944
- Sponsored by: Mrs. F. W. Mihld
- Acquired: 19 February 1945
- Commissioned: 20 February 1945
- Decommissioned: 25 June 1946
- Fate: Scrapped 14 January 1966

General characteristics
- Class & type: Gilliam-class attack transport
- Displacement: 4,247 tons (lt), 7,080 t.(fl)
- Length: 426 ft (130 m)
- Beam: 58 ft (18 m)
- Draft: 16 ft (4.9 m)
- Propulsion: Westinghouse turboelectric drive, 2 boilers, 2 propellers, Design shaft horsepower 6,000
- Speed: 17 knots
- Capacity: 47 Officers, 802 Enlisted
- Crew: 27 Officers, 295 Enlisted
- Armament: 1 x 5"/38 caliber dual-purpose gun mount, 4 x twin 40mm gun mounts, 10 x single 20mm gun mounts
- Notes: MCV Hull No. ?, hull type S4-SE2-BD1

USS Fergus (APA-82) was a Gilliam-class attack transport that served with the United States Navy from 1945 to 1946. She was scrapped in 1966.

== History ==
Fergus was named after a county in Montana. She was launched 24 December 1944 by Consolidated Steel at Wilmington, California; acquired by the Navy 19 February 1945; and commissioned 20 February 1945.

=== World War II and after ===
Fergus sailed from San Diego 19 April 1945 for Saipan, where she transferred Marines to another transport bound for Okinawa. At Guam she unloaded cargo and embarked hospital patients for San Francisco, returning 24 June. Her next voyage, between 1 July and 20 October, was devoted to redeployment of troops among Pacific bases and to occupation duty in Japan. Fergus made two cruises, one to Guam, Leyte, and Pearl Harbor, and the other to Pearl Harbor alone, to return servicemen eligible for discharge.

=== Decommissioning ===
She was decommissioned 25 June 1946 at Pearl Harbor, and towed to San Francisco Bay, where she was transferred to the Maritime Commission for disposal on 4 September 1947. She was scrapped 14 January 1966.
