= SS Mormachawk (1942) =

History

United States
- Name: SS Mormachawk
- Owner: Moore-McCormack Lines (1942-1946); United States Maritime Commission (1946-64)
- Builder: Consolidated Steel Corp., Wilmington, California
- Completed: 14 December 1942
- Identification: Official Number 242615
- Nickname(s): Hawk
- Fate: Scrapped in March 1964

General characteristics
- Class & type: Type C1-B cargo ship
- Tonnage: 6,711 GRT; 8,015 dwt
- Length: 417.75 ft (127.3 m)
- Beam: 60 ft (18.3 m)
- Draft: 27.5 ft (8.4 m)
- Depth: 37.5 ft (11.4 m)
- Installed power: 4,000 hp (3,000 kW)
- Speed: 14 knots (26 km/h)
- Troops: 1,337

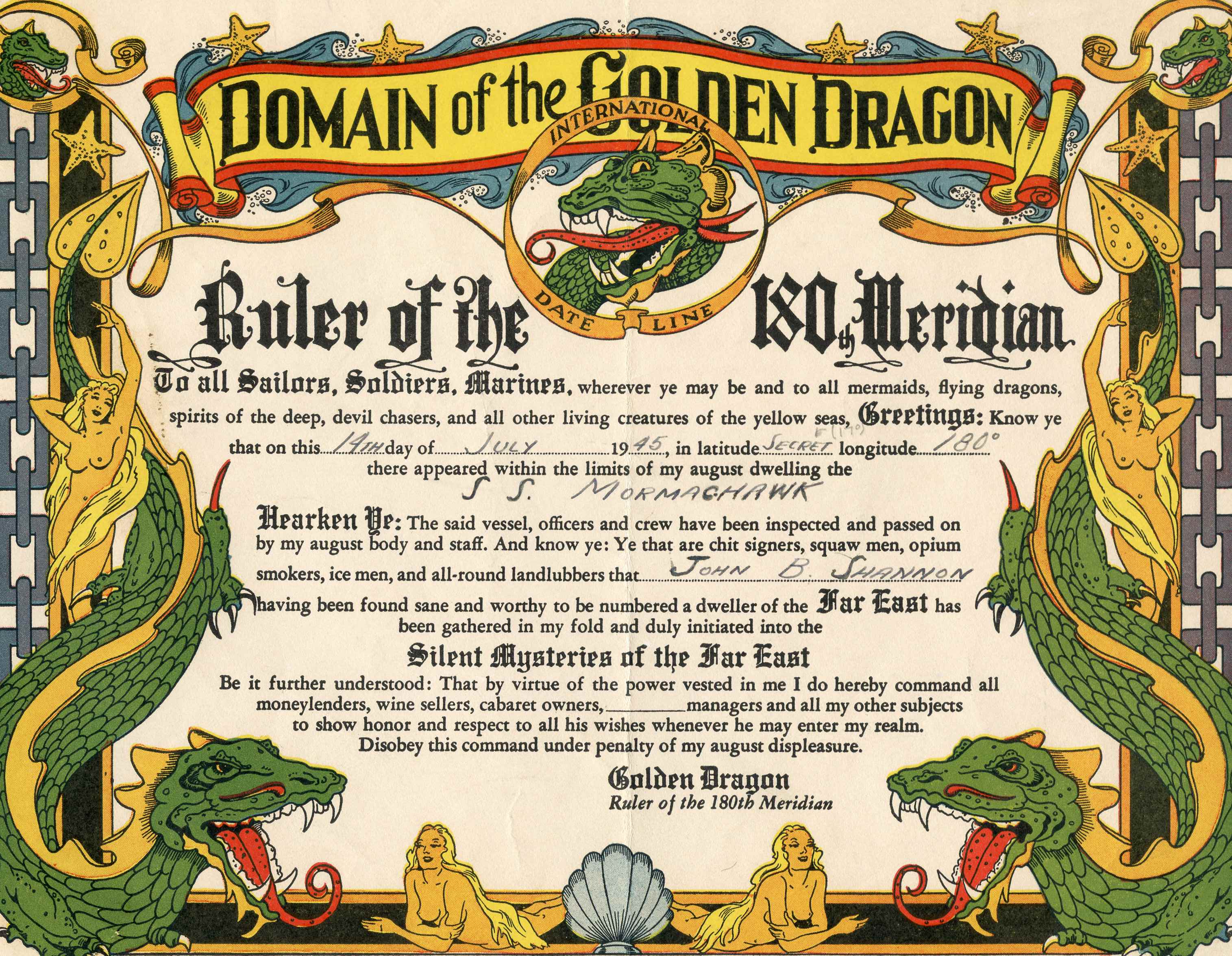
Certificate of crossing the 180th meridian heading to Japan in preparation for the invasion of the Japanese homeland. Note the latitude is listed as 'secret', but was noted as estimated at 17 degrees.

SS Mormachawk was a United States cargo vessel and troop ship during the Second World War operated by Moore-McCormack Lines as agents of the War Shipping Administration (WSA) from completion 14 December 1942 until placed in reserve after the war September 1946. The ship remained in the Columbia River reserve fleet at Astoria, Oregon until sold for scrapping in 1964.

== Construction ==
Mormachawk was built in 1942 by Consolidated Steel Corp., in the Wilmington yard completed 14 December 1942 grossing 6,711 tons. The ship, a standard ship type C1-B and completed as a troop transport, was the first launched from Consolidated's new Wilmington yard sponsored by Eleanor H. Van Valey, secretary to Admiral Emory Land, Chairman of the U.S. Maritime Commission and Administrator of the War Shipping Administration. This ship was Moore-McCormack Lines' second of the name as the earlier type C2 ship of the same name had been acquired by the United States Navy as USS Arcturus in 1940.

== Operation ==
Mormachawk operated under the War Shipping Administration (WSA) by agents. She was acquired by WSA upon completion on 14 December 1942. During World War II the ship operated in the Pacific as a cargo and troop transport operating from the South Pacific to Alaska.

On February 27, 1943 Mormachawk carried the United States 44th Naval Construction Battalion or the "44th Seabees" on their first mission to Espiritu Santo, New Hebrides. They arrived on March 18, crossing the equator on March 7.

The ship transported an advance party of one officer and 86 men of Company "B", 5th Special Naval Construction Battalion, from Dutch Harbor to Adak sailing on 21 July. The 8th Naval Construction Battalion, after completing work in the Aleutian Islands begun in July 1942, returned from Dutch Harbor aboard Mormachawk, leaving Dutch Harbor 8 Aug 1943 and arriving in Seattle, Washington on the 13th.

== Postwar disposal ==
On 3 September 1946 the Mormachawk was returned to United States Maritime Commission and placed in the Columbia River reserve fleet at Astoria, Oregon. As part of the modifications from cargo to troop transport the ship had cement ballast permanently installed; 350 tons (317,515 kg) in #2 hold and 114 tons (103,419 kg) in #3 hold. On 21 December 1951 the ship had been recommended for scrap due to the $530,000 cost of reconversion to cargo use. Under an award of 7 January 1964 to Zidell Explorations, Inc. the ship was delivered for scrapping 12 March 1964 from the reserve fleet at Astoria, Oregon.
