= USS Elkhart =

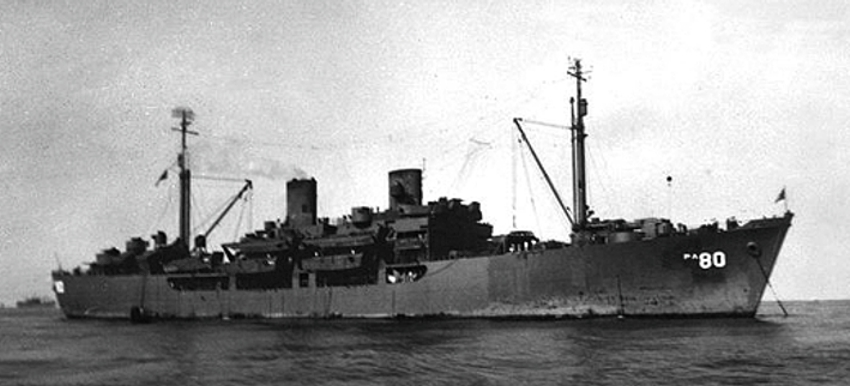
- Elkhart in 1945

History

United States
- Name: USS Elkhart (APA-80)
- Namesake: Elkhart County, Indiana
- Builder: Consolidated Steel
- Launched: 5 December 1944
- Sponsored by: Mrs. J.B. Bonny
- Acquired: 7 February 1945
- Commissioned: 8 February 1945
- Decommissioned: 12 April 1946
- Fate: Scrapped, 1964

General characteristics
- Class & type: Gilliam-class attack transport
- Displacement: 4,247 tons (lt), 7,080 t.(fl)
- Length: 426 ft (130 m)
- Beam: 58 ft (18 m)
- Draft: 16 ft (4.9 m)
- Propulsion: Westinghouse turboelectric drive, 2 boilers, 2 propellers, Design shaft horsepower 6,000
- Speed: 17 knots
- Capacity: 47 Officers, 802 Enlisted
- Crew: 27 Officers, 295 Enlisted
- Armament: 1 x 5"/38 caliber dual-purpose gun mount, 4 x twin 40mm gun mounts, 10 x single 20mm gun mounts
- Notes: MCV Hull No. 1873, hull type S4-SE2-BD1

USS Elkhart (APA-80) was a Gilliam-class attack transport that served with the United States Navy from 1944 to 1945. She was scrapped in 1964.

== History ==
Elkhart was named after a county in Indiana. She was launched 5 December 1944 by Consolidated Steel at Wilmington, Los Angeles, under a Maritime Commission contract; transferred to the Navy 7 February 1945; and commissioned the following day.

=== World War II ===
Sailing from San Diego 3 April 1945, Elkhart during her brief war service carried cargo in or out of Eniwetok, Ulithi, Leyte, Peleliu, Guam, and Okinawa. In July she supported the occupation of Kume Shima in Okinawa Gunto.

==== After hostilities ====
With the end of hostilities, she made one trip to Tokyo Bay to deliver occupation cargo, then transported 6th Marine Division from Guam to reoccupy Qingdao, China. Arriving at Haiphong in November, she embarked Chinese troops for transportation to Chinwangtao, then continued on to Jinsen (Inchon) to embark servicemen eligible for discharge upon return home. They reached the Golden Gate 3 January 1946.

=== Decommissioning ===
Elkhart was decommissioned at Seattle 12 April and returned to the Maritime Commission 28 June 1946. She was finally scrapped in 1964.
