= USS Presidio =

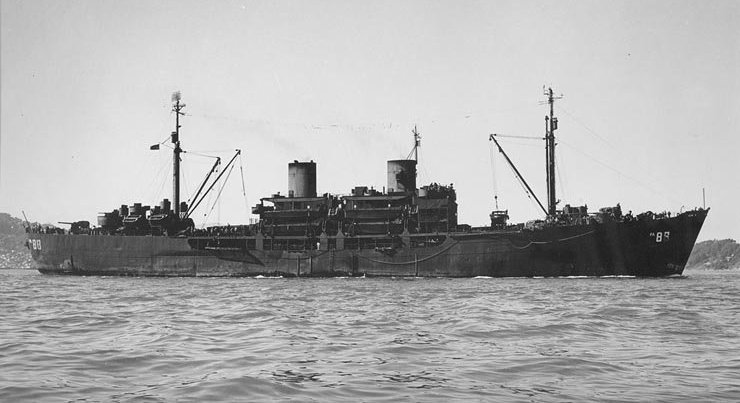
- USS Presidio (APA-88) in San Francisco Bay, late 1945 or early 1946.

History

United States
- Name: USS Presidio (APA-88)
- Namesake: Presidio County, Texas
- Builder: Consolidated Steel
- Laid down: 6 December 1944
- Launched: 17 February 1945
- Sponsored by: Mrs J K Harbert
- Acquired: 8 April 1945
- Commissioned: 9 April 1945
- Decommissioned: 20 June 1946
- Stricken: 1 August 1947
- Fate: Sold for scrap, June 1965

General characteristics
- Class & type: Gilliam-class attack transport
- Displacement: 4,247 tons (lt), 7,080 t.(fl)
- Length: 426 ft (130 m)
- Beam: 58 ft (18 m)
- Draft: 15 ft 6 in (4.72 m)
- Propulsion: Westinghouse turboelectric drive, 2 boilers, 2 propellers, Design shaft horsepower 6,000
- Speed: 16.9 knots
- Capacity: 47 Officers, 802 Enlisted
- Crew: 27 Officers, 295 Enlisted
- Armament: 1 x 5"/38 caliber dual-purpose gun, 4 x twin 40mm guns, 10 x single 20mm guns
- Notes: MCV Hull No. 1881, hull type S4-SE2-BD1

USS Presidio (APA-88) was a Gilliam-class attack transport in service with the United States Navy from 1945 to 1946. She was sold for scrap in 1965.

== History ==
She was laid down 6 December 1944 by the Consolidated Steel Co., Wilmington, California, under Maritime Commission contract (MC hull 1881); launched 17 February 1945; sponsored by Mrs. J. K. Harbert; delivered to the Navy 8 April 1945; and commissioned 9 April 1945.

=== World War II Pacific Theatre operations ===
Following shakedown and amphibious training off California, Presidio departed the U.S. West Coast, 5 June 1945, for Hawaii, whence she carried men and equipment to Eniwetok and Kwajalein. Returning to Eniwetok, she sailed again 13 July and on the 17th rendezvoused with units of the U.S. 3rd Fleet to transfer cargo and personnel as that fleet continued to move against the enemy's home islands.

Following that underway replenishment, she returned to Eniwetok, completed a run to Ulithi and Leyte, then got underway for another transfer of men and materiel at sea. On 17 August, 2 days after the cessation of hostilities, she rendezvoused with task group TG 38.3, then continued on to Eniwetok whence she steamed to Japan, arriving in Tokyo Bay 15 September to commence "Magic Carpet" duty. For the next seven months she plied the Pacific, carrying occupation personnel to Okinawa and Japan and bringing veterans back to the United States.

=== Decommissioning and fate ===
Designated for inactivation in the spring of 1946, she decommissioned at Pearl Harbor 20 June. Towed back to San Francisco, California, the following year, she was struck from the Navy List 1 August 1947 and transferred to the Maritime Commission at Suisun Bay 2 September 1947. She was sold for scrap in June 1965.

== Awards ==
Presidio was awarded one battle star for World War II service.
