= USS Niagara (APA-87) =

Navy ship

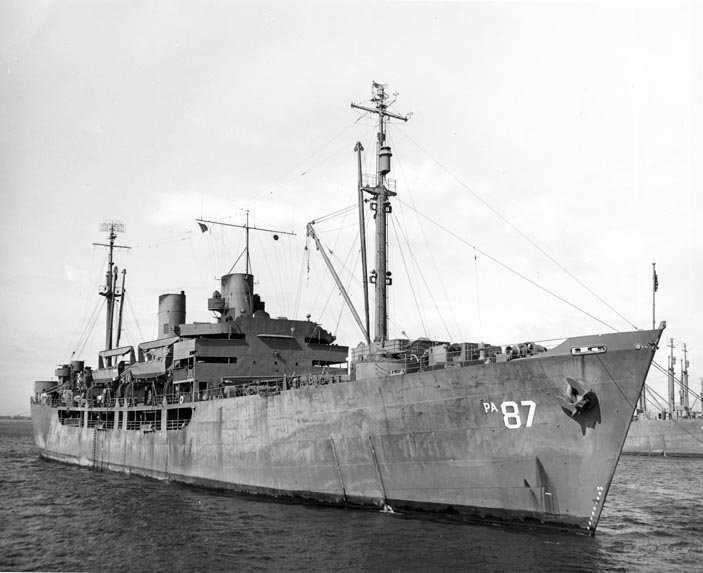

History

United States
- Name: USS Niagara (APA-87)
- Namesake: Fort Niagara, taken from the British in the War of 1812
- Builder: Consolidated Steel
- Laid down: 20 November 1944
- Launched: 10 February 1945
- Sponsored by: Mrs. Fred G. Gurley
- Acquired: 26 March 1945
- Commissioned: 29 March 1945
- Decommissioned: 12 December 1946
- Fate: Sold for scrap, 5 February 1950

General characteristics
- Class & type: Gilliam-class attack transport
- Displacement: 4,247 tons (lt), 7,080 t.(fl)
- Length: 426 ft (130 m)
- Beam: 58 ft (18 m)
- Draft: 16 ft (4.9 m)
- Propulsion: Westinghouse turboelectric drive, 2 boilers, 2 propellers, Design shaft horsepower 6,000
- Speed: 16.9 knots
- Capacity: 47 Officers, 802 Enlisted
- Crew: 27 Officers, 295 Enlisted
- Armament: 1 x 5"/38 caliber dual-purpose gun mount, 4 x twin 40mm gun mounts, 10 x single 20mm gun mounts
- Notes: MCV Hull No. 1880, hull type S4-SE2-BD1

USS Niagara (APA-87) was a Gilliam-class attack transport that served with the United States Navy from 1945 to 1946. She was scrapped in 1950.

== History ==
Niagara was named after Fort Niagara, a fort captured from the British by American forces 28 November 1812; she was the eighth US Navy ship to bear the name. She was laid down 20 November 1944 under Maritime Commission contract by Consolidated Steel at Wilmington, California; launched 10 February 1945; acquired by the Navy 26 March 1945; and commissioned at San Pedro, California, 29 March 1945.

=== World War II ===
Following amphibious warfare training out of San Diego, Niagara sailed 26 May 1945 with cargo and 887 Marines, whom she landed at Pearl Harbor 1 June. In the following weeks she transported troops, cargo, ammunition, and mail between the various Hawaiian Islands.

She stood out of Pearl Harbor 1 July bound, via the Marshalls and Carolines, for Okinawa, arriving Buckner Bay 5 August. After debarking 903 Army troops and their combat support weapons and cargo, she departed 8 August with 40 officers and 771 men of the 81st Naval Construction Battalion for debarking at Guam in the Marianas. She arrived Apra Harbor on the morning of 15 August, the day of Japan's capitulation.

=== After hostilities ===
Niagara transported Navy passengers from Guam to the Philippines, arriving San Pedro Bay 20 August. She then set course for Cebu to embark the Army's 164th Regimental Combat Team, sailed 1 September, arrived Yokohama the 8th, and landed her occupation troops. She again headed for the Philippines 16 September to embark men of the Army's 305th Infantry, 77th Division, landed at Otaru, Hokkaidō, Japan, 5 October. From there, she carried men of the Navy's 128th Construction Battalion to Apra Harbor.

She stood out from Apra Harbor 22 October with an Army signal battalion bound for China. The attack transport reached Tientsin 29 October and sailed 10 November for the Marianas. Joining Operation Magic Carpet, the massive operation to return demobilizing servicemen, she embarked Army troops in Tanapag Harbor, Saipan, Marianas; sailed the 20th; and reached San Francisco 4 December.

=== Operation Crossroads ===
Niagara departed San Francisco 20 December for Samar, Philippine Islands, arriving 10 January 1946. While there, she received word that she would participate in the atomic bomb tests of Operation Crossroads as a unit of Joint Task Force 1. She put to sea 3 February to prepare at Pearl Harbor, then sailed to Bikini Atoll in the Marshalls, the location of the tests, arriving 31 May.

A target ship, Niagara survived the atomic explosions of 1 and 25 July. She departed Bikini 21 August for and towed the battleship USS Pennsylvania (BB-38) to Kwajalein for tests, and Pearl Harbor en route to San Francisco, arriving 16 September.

=== Decommissioning ===
Niagara remained on the west coast until she departed San Diego 7 November, steaming via the Panama Canal to Hampton Roads, Virginia. She arrived Norfolk, Virginia on 2 December and decommissioned there 12 December 1946.

After serving to test the effects of special conventional explosives in the Chesapeake Bay, Niagara was sold for scrapping on 5 February 1950 to the Northern Metals Company of Philadelphia, Pennsylvania.
