= USS Geneva =

United States Navy attack transport ship

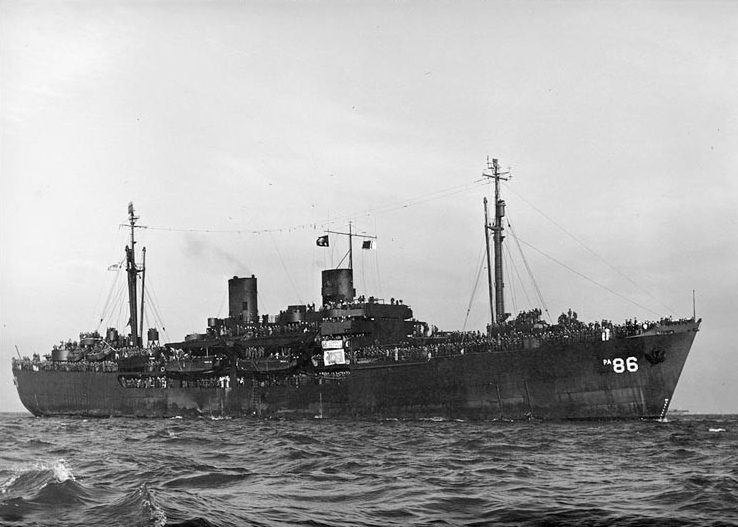
- Geneva, circa in December 1945

History

United States
- Name: USS Geneva (APA-86)
- Namesake: Geneva County, Alabama
- Builder: Consolidated Steel
- Launched: 31 January 1945
- Sponsored by: Mrs. Leonard Firestone
- Acquired: 21 March 1944
- Commissioned: 22 March 1945
- Decommissioned: 23 January 1947
- Stricken: 25 February 1947
- Fate: Sold for scrap, 2 November 1966

General characteristics
- Class & type: Gilliam-class attack transport
- Displacement: 4,247 tons (lt), 7,080 t.(fl)
- Length: 426 ft
- Beam: 58 ft
- Draft: 16 ft
- Propulsion: Westinghouse turboelectric drive, 2 boilers, 2 propellers, Design shaft horsepower 6,000
- Speed: 17 knots
- Capacity: 47 Officers, 802 Enlisted
- Crew: 27 Officers, 295 Enlisted
- Armament: 1 x 5"/38 caliber dual-purpose gun mount, 4 x twin 40 mm gun mounts, 10 x single 20 mm gun mounts
- Notes: MCV Hull No. ?, hull type S4-SE2-BD1

USS Geneva (APA-86) was a Gilliam-class attack transport that served with the United States Navy from 1945 to 1947. She was scrapped in 1966.

== History ==
Geneva was named after a county in Alabama. She was launched under Maritime Commission contract 31 January 1945 by Consolidated Steel at Wilmington, Los Angeles; acquired by the Navy 21 March 1945 and commissioned the following day.

=== World War II ===
Following shakedown out of San Diego, Geneva departed that port 19 May 1945 with over 500 marines and sailors for Pearl Harbor and Majuro atoll, Marshall Islands, where she arrived 7 June. After embarking marines and Japanese prisoners of war, she picked up additional passengers at Kwajalein for passage to Pearl Harbor. At Pearl Harbor, she picked up veterans whom she landed at San Francisco 27 June.

Proceeding to Seattle, she embarked nearly a thousand soldiers for the garrison forces on Okinawa, debarking them at Buckner Bay 12 August.

=== After hostilities ===
Geneva sailed from Okinawa 5 September for Korea and landed Army units at Inchon 8 September. She returned to Okinawa 15 September, weathered a typhoon, and embarked the 11th Artillery Regiment of the 4th Marine Battalion and their cargo for passage to Taku, China, where she arrived 5 October. There she received 21 European repatriates on board, embarked 302 others at Qingdao 7 October, and carried her passengers to Hong Kong on the 13th.

These 302 passengers were also European repatriates, mostly British, who had spent between three and four years in various Japanese concentration camps. They had been rescued from the Weihsien Civil Assembly Centre at what is now Weifang city, Shandong Province, on 17 August 1945 by 7 US paratroopers of the Duck Mission, only two days after VJ Day. In Hong Kong the passengers were handed over to the British forces, and repatriated to their home countries in the next few months by RAPWI. On this passage, when the Geneva had to skirt the outside of the Island of Taiwan, then Formosa, because the Formosa Straights had not yet been swept for mines, she struck an even worse typhoon on 9 October 1945, which virtually destroyed the US base at Okinawa. She had a destroyer escort ahead of her, but the 100 ft (30 m) waves meant they only caught sight each other every five or ten minutes. By the grace of God both survived.

At Hong Kong, she received Chinese troops and equipment, transported them to Chinwangtao 30 October, and returned to Hong Kong to embark more Chinese troops for passage to Qingdao, arriving 14 November.

Geneva departed Qingdao on 23 November, embarked over a thousand homeward-bound veterans at Luzon, Philippines, and reached San Francisco 19 December. On 11 January 1946, she began a troop-transport voyage from San Francisco to Pearl Harbor and returned to San Diego 7 February.

=== Operation Crossroads ===
The attack transport returned to Pearl Harbor 2 March for training in the Hawaiian area until she departed 17 May to serve in Operation Crossroads, a joint atomic bomb experiment of the Army and Navy in the Marshall Islands at Bikini Atoll. More than 200 ships, 150 aircraft, and some 42,000 men were involved in this vast experiment directed by Vice Admiral William H. P. Blandy. Seventy-five target ships – American, German, and Japanese – were moored in the target area.

Geneva arrived off Bikini on 30 May 1946 and rode at anchor for a month. Her crew then transferred to USS Appling (APA-58) since Geneva was to be one of the target ships in "Test Able" on the morning of 1 July 1946 when the fourth atomic bomb to be exploded and the first ever detonated over water was to be dropped from a B-29. The attack transport survived the explosion and the huge column of water and steam that rose to 35,000 feet (11,000 m) and formed a mushroom-shaped cloud.

Geneva was declared free of radioactivity the following day. She also survived "Test Baker" 25 July. That morning at 0835 an atomic bomb suspended below LSM-60 was exploded – the first to be detonated under water. Geneva was in normal operation 4 days after that explosion, steaming to Kwajalein 25 August, then proceeding via Hawaii to San Francisco, where she arrived 5 November.

=== Decommissioning and fate ===
Geneva departed San Francisco on 4 December, touched San Diego and transited the Panama Canal for Norfolk, Virginia, where she arrived on the 27th. She was decommissioned at Norfolk 23 January 1947, and her name was struck from the Navy List on 25 February. She was returned to the United States Maritime Commission on 2 April and joined the National Defense Reserve Fleet at James River, Virginia.

Geneva was transferred to Wilmington, North Carolina, in July 1955 and sold for scrap by the Maritime Administration on 2 November 1966.
