= USS Carlisle =

Attack transport sunk at Bikini atoll

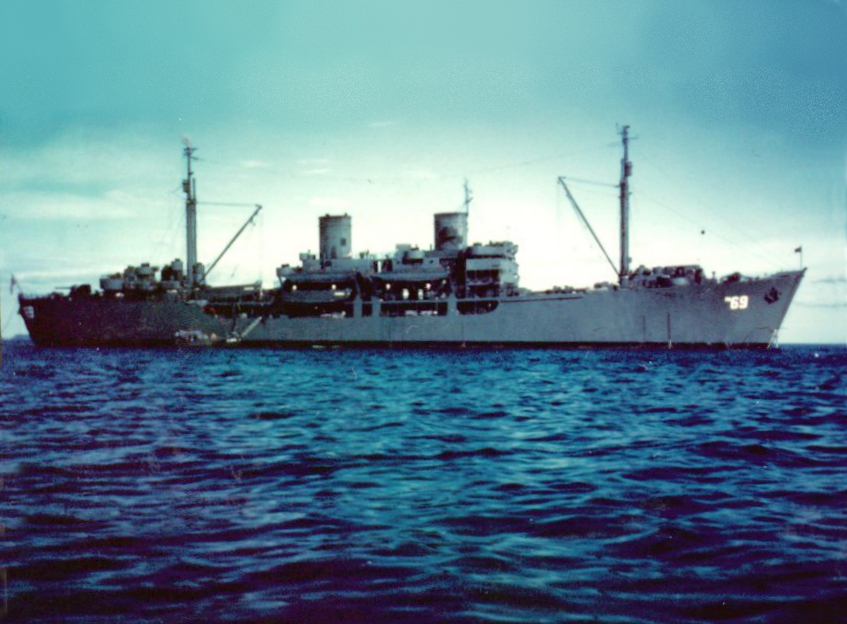

History

United States
- Name: USS Carlisle (APA-69)
- Namesake: Carlisle County, Kentucky
- Builder: Consolidated Steel
- Launched: 30 July 1944
- Sponsored by: Mrs E. C. Parsons
- Acquired: 28 November 1944
- Commissioned: 29 November 1944
- Fate: Sunk as a target in Operation Crossroads on 1 July 1946

General characteristics
- Class & type: Gilliam-class attack transport
- Displacement: 4,247 tons (lt), 7,080 t.(fl)
- Length: 426 ft (130 m)
- Beam: 58 ft (18 m)
- Draft: 16 ft (4.9 m)
- Propulsion: Westinghouse turboelectric drive, 2 boilers, 2 propellers, Design shaft horsepower 6,000
- Speed: 17 knots
- Capacity: 47 Officers, 802 Enlisted
- Crew: 27 Officers, 295 Enlisted
- Armament: 1 x 5"/38 caliber dual-purpose gun mount, 4 x twin 40mm gun mounts, 10 x single 20mm gun mounts
- Notes: MCV Hull No. ?, hull type S4-SE2-BD1

USS Carlisle (APA-69) was a Gilliam-class attack transport that served with the United States Navy from 1944 to 1946. She was sunk as a target ship during Operation Crossroads in July 1946.

== History ==
Carlisle was named after a county in Kentucky. She was launched 30 July 1944 by Consolidated Steel at San Pedro, California, under a Maritime Commission contract; acquired by the Navy 28 November 1944 and commissioned the next day.

=== World War II ===
Carlisle cleared San Diego 23 January 1945, carrying sailors, Marines, and general cargo to Pearl Harbor. She returned to San Francisco 11 February, and after repairs, sailed to San Diego to load passengers and cargo for Pearl Harbor. Between 2 April and 5 June, she had duty training and transporting Marine units among the islands of the Hawaiian group.

=== After hostilities ===
Carlisle made three voyages to the west coast from Hawaii and Japan, and shorter passages among South Pacific islands, redeploying servicemen until 4 February 1946.

=== Operation Crossroads ===
Carlisle was then assigned as a target vessel for Operation Crossroads, the atomic bomb tests at Bikini Atoll, and was sunk in one of those tests on 1 July 1946. Carlisle was decommissioned at Bikini Atoll and struck from the Navy Register, both dates unknown.

== Decorations ==
Carlisle received two Navy Occupation Service Medals for service during the occupation of Japan after World War II.
