= USS El Paso (PF-41) =

Tacoma-class patrol frigate

History

United States
- Name: El Paso
- Namesake: City of El Paso, Texas
- Builder: Consolidated Steel Corporation, Wilmington, California
- Launched: 16 July 1943
- Commissioned: 1 December 1943
- Decommissioned: 18 July 1946
- Honors and awards: 3 × battle stars (World War II)
- Fate: Sold for scrapping, 14 October 1947

General characteristics
- Class & type: Tacoma-class frigate
- Displacement: 2,230 long tons (2,266 t)
- Length: 303 ft 11 in (92.63 m)
- Beam: 37 ft 6 in (11.43 m)
- Draft: 12 ft 8 in (3.86 m)
- Propulsion: 2-shaft Vertical Triple Expansion turbines; 3 boilers; 2 shafts
- Speed: 20 knots (37 km/h; 23 mph)
- Range: 9,500 nmi (17,600 km) at 12 kn (22 km/h; 14 mph)
- Complement: 190
- Armament: 3 × 3"/50 dual purpose guns (3x1); 4 x 40 mm guns (2×2); 9 × 20 mm guns (9×1); 1 × Hedgehog anti-submarine mortar; 8 × depth charge projectors; 2 × Depth charge tracks

USS El Paso (PF-41) was a Tacoma-class frigate crewed by the United States Coast Guard for the United States Navy. She was named after El Paso, a city in Western Texas along the border with New Mexico and the Mexican state of Chihuahua.

El Paso was launched on 16 July 1943 at Consolidated Steel Corporation, Ltd., in Wilmington, California, under a Maritime Commission contract, sponsored by Mrs. J. L. Kaster and commissioned on 1 December 1943.

== Service history ==
Sailing from San Diego, California, on 20 February 1944, El Paso arrived at Milne Bay, New Guinea, on 4 April after training at Pearl Harbor and convoy escort duty to the Gilberts and Espiritu Santo en route. The frigate patrolled in the New Guinea area and carried out several bombardment missions. On 25 May, she shelled enemy positions at Maffin Bay, and 2 days later, in company with two destroyer escorts, bombarded Wakde Island. On the night of 14 June, she provided fire support at Aitape, and on the 25th, blasted the edge of the airfield on Wakde Island. The next mission was a combination of scouting, salvage, and rescue work at Pagan and Fanildo Islands on 25 August.

In September 1944, El Paso joined the screen of the forces landing at Morotai, then operated between this newly won base and New Guinea during the buildup for the invasion of the Philippines. On 29 October, nine days after the initial landings, El Paso arrived at Leyte for patrol and screen duty. She returned to New Guinea in November to bombard Sarmi Point and Mount Makko on the 11th, then was assigned to escort duty between New Guinea and the Philippines until the year's end.

El Paso departed Humboldt Bay (Hollandia) on 6 January 1945 and sailed to New York for overhaul, during which she was converted to a weather ship. Her conversion was interrupted by a convoy escort voyage to Oran, Algeria, in April and May 1945.

When World War II ended, the frigate was on its way back to the Pacific and arrived at Leyte on 23 September, serving as a weather station ship in the Philippines until 16 April 1946. She returned to the West Coast, was decommissioned at Seattle, Washington, on 18 July 1946, and was sold on 14 October 1947.

El Paso received Five battle stars for World War II service.

== Sources ==
- The Coast Guard at War, Transports and Escorts, Vol. V, No. 1.
- Conway's All the World's Fighting Ships 1922-1946. London: Conway Maritime Press, 1992, pp. 148–149.
- USCG Home Website
- , Vol. II, pp. 345–346.
