= USS Brule (APA-66) =

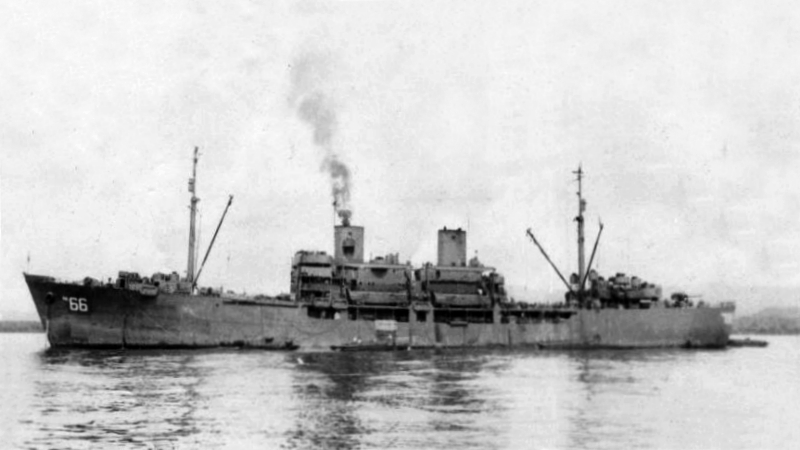
- Brule in 1945

History

United States
- Name: USS Brule (APA-66)
- Namesake: Brule County, South Dakota
- Builder: Consolidated Steel
- Laid down: 10 April 1944
- Launched: 30 June 1944
- Sponsored by: Miss Patricia Moreell
- Acquired: 31 October 1944
- Commissioned: 31 October 1944
- Decommissioned: 29 August 1946
- Stricken: 28 May 1948
- Fate: Sunk as a target off Kwajalein 11 May 1948 after use as a target in Operation Crossroads

General characteristics
- Class & type: Gilliam-class attack transport
- Displacement: 4,247 tons (lt), 7,080 t.(fl)
- Length: 426 ft (130 m)
- Beam: 58 ft (18 m)
- Draft: 16 ft (4.9 m)
- Propulsion: Westinghouse turboelectric drive, 2 boilers, 2 propellers, Design shaft horsepower 6,000
- Speed: 16.9 knots
- Capacity: 47 Officers, 802 Enlisted
- Crew: 27 Officers, 295 Enlisted
- Armament: 1 x 5"/38 caliber dual-purpose gun mount, 4 x twin 40mm gun mounts, 10 x single 20mm gun mounts
- Notes: MCV Hull No. 1859, hull type S4-SE2-BD1

USS Brule (APA-66) was a Gilliam-class attack transport that served with the United States Navy from 1944 to 1946. She was sunk as a target in 1948.

== History ==
Brule was named after the county in South Dakota. She was launched 30 June 1944 by Consolidated Steel at Wilmington, Los Angeles, under a Maritime Commission contract; sponsored by Miss Patricia Moreell, daughter of Vice Admiral Ben Moreell. Brule was acquired by the Navy on 31 October 1944, and commissioned the same day.

=== World War II ===
Brule joined Transport Squadron 16 and departed San Pedro 26 November 1944 for Pearl Harbor. In December 1944 was in the vicinity of the Hawaiian Islands, in preparation for the assault on Iwo Jima. As the task force left for the assault, Brule lost one of her new turbine engines as was forced to return to Pearl Harbor for rapid repair; Brule caught up with the invasion force on D-plus-4, 24 February, and remained off the island through the remainder of the battle, taking some of the few surviving Japanese prisoners off the island and carrying them in her brig to custody. From April 1945 until the cessation of hostilities Brule carried troops and supplies between various bases in the Bonins, Marianas, Marshalls, Philippines, and Solomons.

=== Post-war ===
After the war's end, Brule operated with the 7th Fleet during the occupation of Korea and China.

In November 1945 Brule became a unit of the Operation Magic Carpet fleet, tasked with bringing returning servicemen home from the war.

=== Operation Crossroads ===
While at Yokosuka, during one of her voyages, Brule was ordered to prepare for assignment to the target fleet for Operation Crossroads, the atomic bomb tests at Bikini Atoll. She completed her run from Yokosuka to Pearl Harbor and then commenced preparation for the operation.

Brule survived the atomic bomb tests at Bikini and following the test period was decommissioned and maintained for radiological and structural studies. She was destroyed by sinking 11 May 1948.
