= USS Briscoe (APA-65) =

WW2 US Navy transport ship

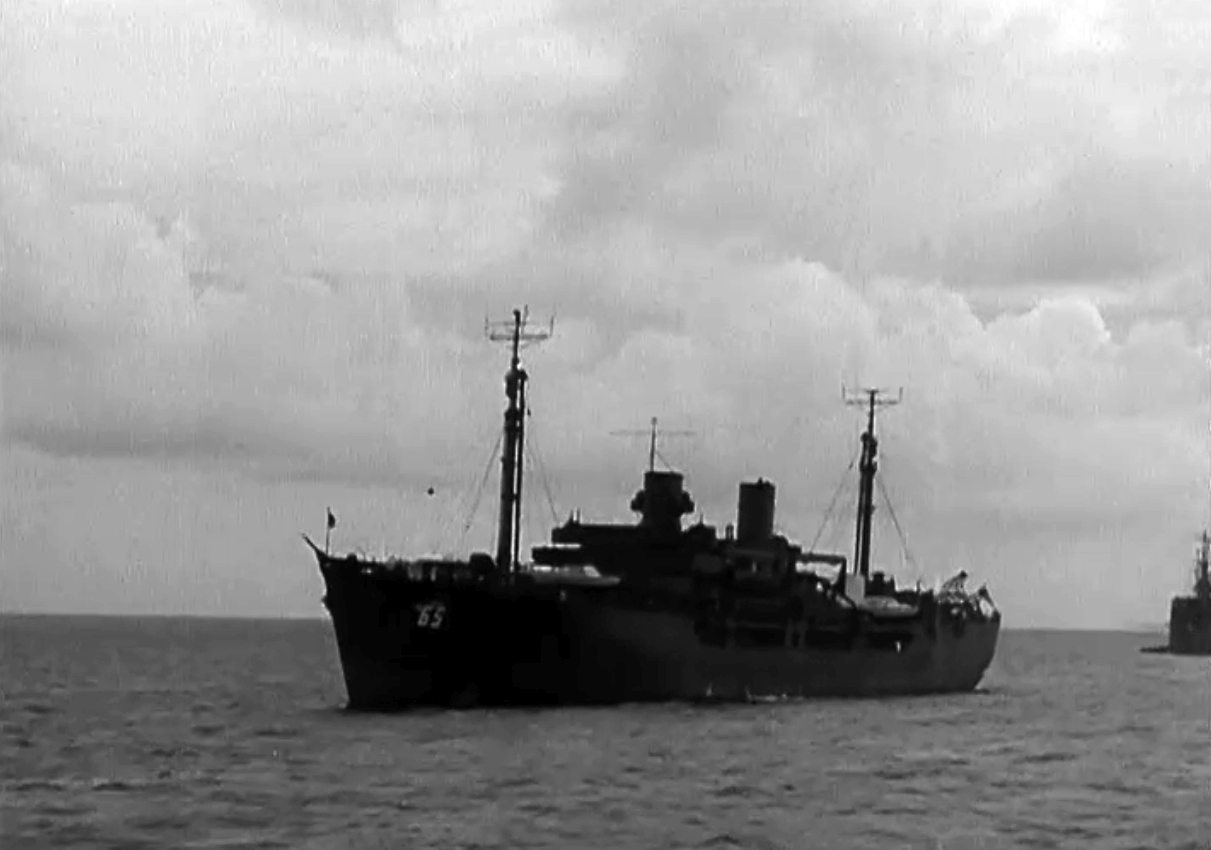
- Briscoe at Bikini Atoll, late May 1946

History

United States
- Name: USS Briscoe (APA-65)
- Namesake: Briscoe County, Texas
- Builder: Consolidated Steel
- Laid down: 29 March 1944
- Launched: 19 June 1944
- Sponsored by: Mrs C. W. Giegerich
- Acquired: 29 October 1944
- Commissioned: 29 October 1944
- Decommissioned: 29 August 1946
- Stricken: 13 July 1948
- Fate: Sunk by USS Duluth (CL-87) off Kwajalein, 6 May 1948 after use as a target in Operation Crossroads

General characteristics
- Class & type: Gilliam-class attack transport
- Displacement: 4,247 tons (lt), 7,080 t.(fl)
- Length: 426 ft (130 m)
- Beam: 58 ft (18 m)
- Draft: 16 ft (4.9 m)
- Propulsion: Westinghouse turboelectric drive, 2 boilers, 2 propellers, Design shaft horsepower 6,000
- Speed: 16.9 knots
- Capacity: 47 Officers, 802 Enlisted
- Crew: 27 Officers, 295 Enlisted
- Armament: 1 x 5"/38 caliber dual-purpose gun mount, 4 x twin 40mm gun mounts, 10 x single 20mm gun mounts
- Notes: MCV Hull No. 1858, hull type S4-SE2-BD1

USS Briscoe (APA-65) was a Gilliam-class attack transport that served with the United States Navy from 1944 to 1946. She was sunk as a target in 1948.

== History ==
Briscoe was launched 19 June 1944 by Consolidated Steel at Wilmington, California, under a Maritime Commission contract; acquired by the Navy 29 October 1944; and commissioned the same day. She was named after Briscoe County in northwestern Texas.

=== World War II ===
Briscoe went through initial shakedown exercises off San Pedro, Los Angeles in November, 1944. Then, she loaded troops and cargo at Port Hueneme, California, and steamed to Pearl Harbor, where she arrived on 13 December and reported to the Commander, Naval Surface Forces Pacific (ComPhibPac), at Pearl Harbor Naval Station, as a Transports-Assault (APA) class ship. She engaged in more training and shakedown exercises, including, "gunnery, towing, night steaming, fueling at sea, damage control, and other operational and combat procedures" preparing for the invasion of Iwo Jima. In February 1945, she underwent repairs of her engineering plant missing the Battle of Iwo Jima. During her preparation for the Battle of Okinawa, she collided with the USS Osage (LSV-3). Repairs kept her grounded until 6 April 1945, when she joined the Transport Division (TransDiv) 51 and proceeded to shuttle troops and cargo between the Marshalls, Marianas, Philippines, Solomon Islands, and New Guinea, making a trip to San Francisco in May.

=== After hostilities ===
On 27 August 1945, after being delayed by a typhoon, Briscoe departed the Philippines for Japan. Upon arrival, she joined the naval occupation forces and served primarily as a transport between the Philippine Islands and China. On 2 September 1945, she was present in Tokyo Bay during the Surrender of Japan formal ceremony, passing past USS Missouri (BB-63) in a convoy of Allied ships. Next day, she departed from Tokyo Bay with troops who were ordered to occupy the Tateyama naval air station. After that, she carried troops from Guam to Okinawa, and later to northern China. Briscoe departed the Far East 30 November 1945 and returned to the United States. During the early months of 1946, she made several voyages between the ports of California and the Pacific islands as part of the so-called Magic Carpet Fleet, returning American troops to the United States.

=== Operation Crossroads ===
In the spring of 1946 Briscoe was assigned as a target ship for Operation Crossroads, the atomic bomb tests at Bikini Atoll. She survived two atomic blasts in the target area at Bikini on 1 and 25 July, but after tests, was decommissioned and kept for two years for radiological and structural studies at Kwajalein. On 6 May 1948, USS Briscoe was scuttled off Marshall Islands by USS Duluth (CL-87). Her name was struck from the Naval Vessel Register on 13 July 1948.
