= USS Carteret =

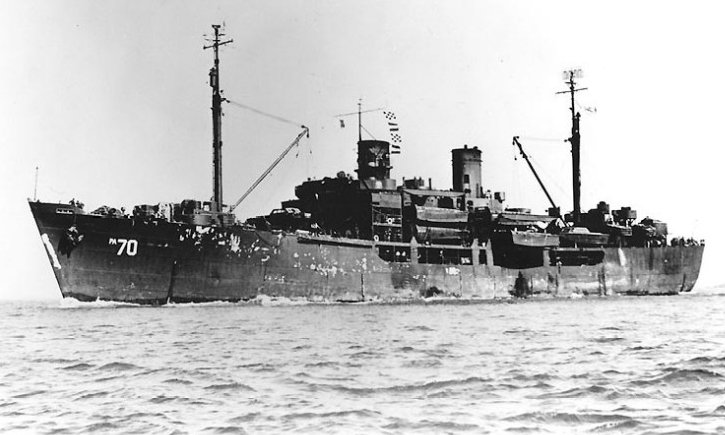
- USS Carteret (APA-70) underway in San Francisco Bay, early 1946

History

United States
- Name: USS Carteret (APA-70)
- Namesake: Carteret County, North Carolina
- Builder: Consolidated Steel
- Launched: 15 August 1944
- Sponsored by: Mrs. A. Wright
- Acquired: 2 December 1944
- Commissioned: 3 December 1944
- Decommissioned: 6 August 1946
- Fate: Sunk as target, 19 April 1948

General characteristics
- Class & type: Gilliam-class attack transport
- Displacement: 4,247 tons (lt), 7,080 t.(fl)
- Length: 426 ft (130 m)
- Beam: 58 ft (18 m)
- Draft: 16 ft (4.9 m)
- Propulsion: Westinghouse turboelectric drive, 2 boilers, 2 propellers, Design shaft horsepower 6,000
- Speed: 16.9 knots
- Capacity: 47 Officers, 802 Enlisted
- Crew: 27 Officers, 295 Enlisted
- Armament: 1 x 5"/38 caliber dual-purpose gun mount, 4 x twin 40 mm gun mounts, 10 x single 20 mm gun mounts
- Notes: MCV Hull No. 1863, hull type S4-SE2-BD1

USS Carteret (APA-70) was a Gilliam-class attack transport that served with the United States Navy from 1944 to 1946. She was sunk as a target in 1948.

== History ==
Carteret was named after Carteret County, North Carolina. She was launched 15 August 1944 by Consolidated Steel at Wilmington, California, under a Maritime Commission contract; acquired by the Navy 2 December 1944; commissioned the next day, and reported to the Pacific Fleet. Carteret sailed from San Diego 24 January 1945 carrying troops to Pearl Harbor.

=== Invasion of Iwo Jima ===
With a call en route at Saipan, she arrived off Iwo Jima to land troops and equipment in the invasion of the bitterly contested island 19 February. She remained off the island to support the hard-fighting Marines until 2 March, when she retired carrying casualties whom she took to Saipan.

=== Invasion of Okinawa ===
Carteret then sailed on to Tulagi and Espiritu Santo, arriving 19 March to load troops and vehicles designated as reinforcements for Okinawa. The attack transport reached the Okinawa beachhead 9 April 1945, and for the next seven days followed the pattern of unloading by day, and retirement seaward by night. Unscathed by the fury of the Japanese kamikaze attacks, she returned to Ulithi for repairs 23 April.

On 16 May she got underway for Palau, Cebu, and San Pedro Bay, P.I., at which points she embarked passengers for transportation to San Francisco, where she arrived on 27 June. After brief repairs at Seattle, Washington, she sailed 17 July for duty in the redeployment of troops and equipment in the Pacific.

=== After hostilities ===
Carteret called at Pearl Harbor, Okinawa, and Leyte, where she embarked occupation troops for Jinsen, Korea. Another voyage from the Philippines to Jinsen preceded her employment from 24 October 1945 to 2 March 1946 in two voyages from Japan and Okinawa to the west coast returning servicemen.

=== Operation Crossroads ===
After special training at Pearl Harbor, Carteret was transferred to JTF-1 for use in the atomic bomb experiments at Bikini Atoll, known as Operation Crossroads, between 28 May and 27 August. Carteret was decommissioned 6 August 1946, and upon the completion of the tests, was towed to Kwajalein for study. There she was sunk by USS Toledo (CA-133) on 19 April 1948.

Carteret received two battle stars for World War II service.
