= USS Crenshaw =

Former United States Navy attack transport

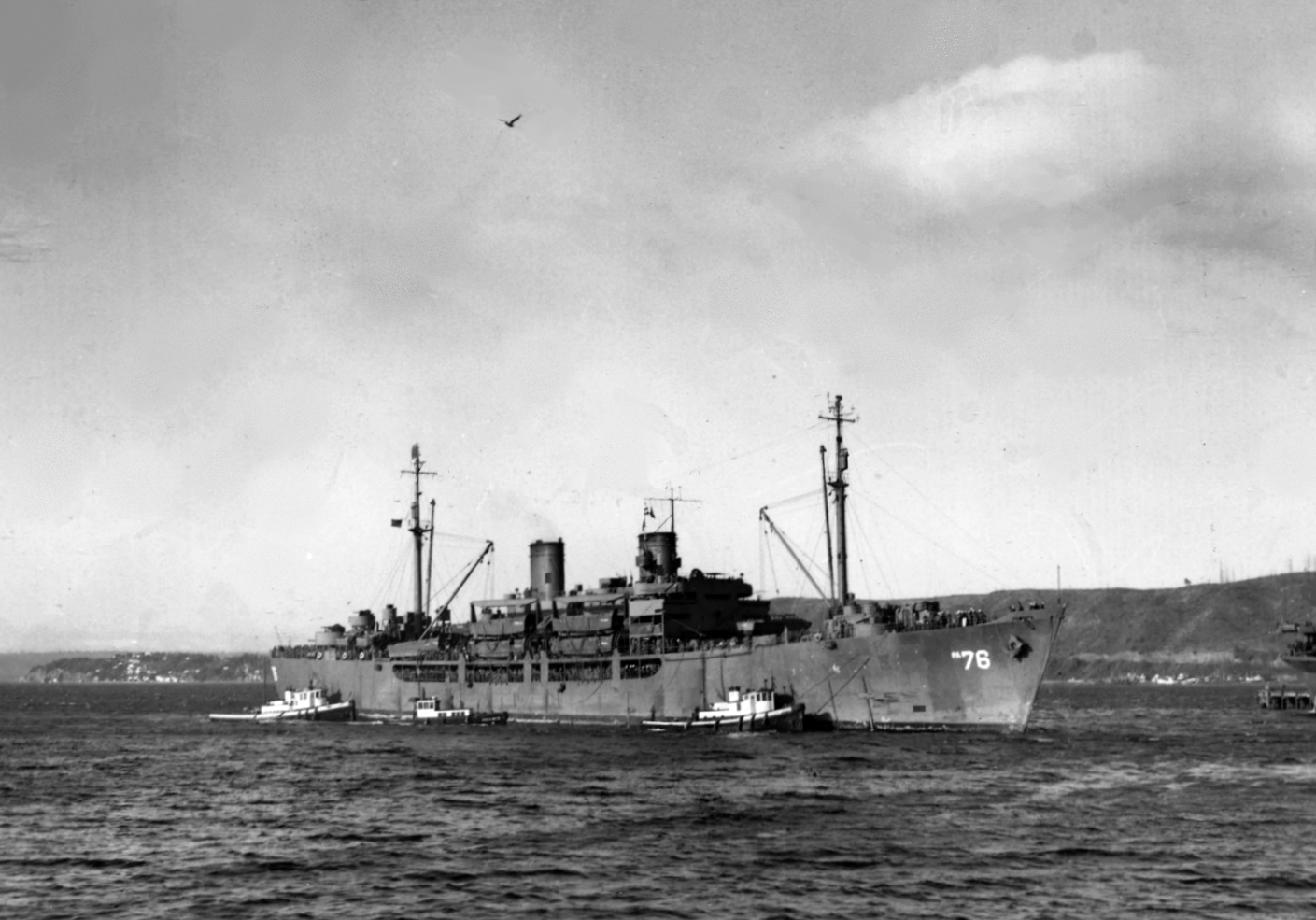
- Crenshaw in December 1945

History

United States
- Name: USS Crenshaw (APA-76)
- Namesake: Crenshaw County, Alabama
- Builder: Consolidated Steel
- Launched: 27 October 1944
- Sponsored by: Mrs. F. M. Earle
- Acquired: 3 January 1944
- Commissioned: 4 January 1945
- Decommissioned: 19 April 1946
- Fate: Scrapped 22 December 1964

General characteristics
- Class & type: Gilliam-class attack transport
- Displacement: 4,247 tons (lt), 7,080 t.(fl)
- Length: 426 ft (130 m)
- Beam: 58 ft (18 m)
- Draft: 16 ft (4.9 m)
- Propulsion: Westinghouse turboelectric drive, 2 boilers, 2 propellers, Design shaft horsepower 6,000
- Speed: 16.9 knots
- Capacity: 47 Officers, 802 Enlisted
- Crew: 27 Officers, 295 Enlisted
- Armament: 1 x 5"/38 caliber dual-purpose gun mount, 4 x twin 40mm gun mounts, 10 x single 20mm gun mounts
- Notes: MCV Hull No. ?, hull type S4-SE2-BD1

USS Crenshaw (APA-76) was a Gilliam-class attack transport that served with the United States Navy from 1945 to 1946. She was scrapped in 1964.

== History ==
Crenshaw was named after a county in Alabama. She was launched 27 October 1944 by Consolidated Steel at Wilmington, California, under a Maritime Commission contract; transferred to the Navy 3 January 1945; and commissioned the next day.

=== World War II ===
Crenshaw arrived at Pearl Harbor 5 March 1945 and joined in amphibious training in the Hawaiian Islands until 9 June when she sailed with passengers for San Francisco. She sailed to Seattle for repairs and from there put to sea 7 July for Pearl Harbor, Eniwetok, Ulithi, and Okinawa, arriving just after the end of hostilities on 12 August.

=== Postwar transport missions ===
On occupation duty she carried Marines to Jinsen, Korea and to Taku, China, then sailed by way of Manila to Hong Kong to transport Chinese troops to Chinwangtao and Qingdao. At Nagoya, Japan, she embarked homeward-bound troops and sailed 27 November for Tacoma, Washington, arriving 11 December.

=== Decommissioning ===
Crenshaw was decommissioned at Seattle 19 April 1946 and delivered to the War Shipping Administration 30 June 1946 for disposal. She was scrapped by Zidell Explorations Inc. on 22 December 1964.
