= SS Mormacgull =

Two ships of Moore-McCormack have borne the name Mormacgull

- SS Mormacgull (1939) was launched in 1939 as a Type C2 ship. She was acquired by the US Navy in 1941 as an Arcturus-class attack cargo ship and renamed USS Alcyone. She was decommissioned in 1946, sold into civilian service in 1947 as the Star Alcyone and scrapped in 1969.
- SS Mormacgull (1943) was launched in 1943 as a Type C1-B ship. She was renamed Mormacreed in 1946 and was transferred to the National Defense Reserve Fleet in 1959. She was scrapped in 1970.
