= SS Mormaclark =

Two ships of Moore-McCormack have borne the name Mormaclark

- SS Mormaclark was launched in 1939 as a Type C2 ship. She was acquired by the US Navy in 1941 as an Arcturus-class attack cargo ship and renamed USS Betelgeuse. She was decommissioned in 1946, sold into civilian service in 1947 as the Star Betelgeuze and scrapped in 1972.
- SS Mormaclark was launched in 1942 as a Type C1-B ship. She was transferred to the National Defense Reserve Fleet in 1959 and scrapped in 1970.
