= List of shipwrecks of Oceania =

This is a list of shipwrecks located in the region of Oceania.

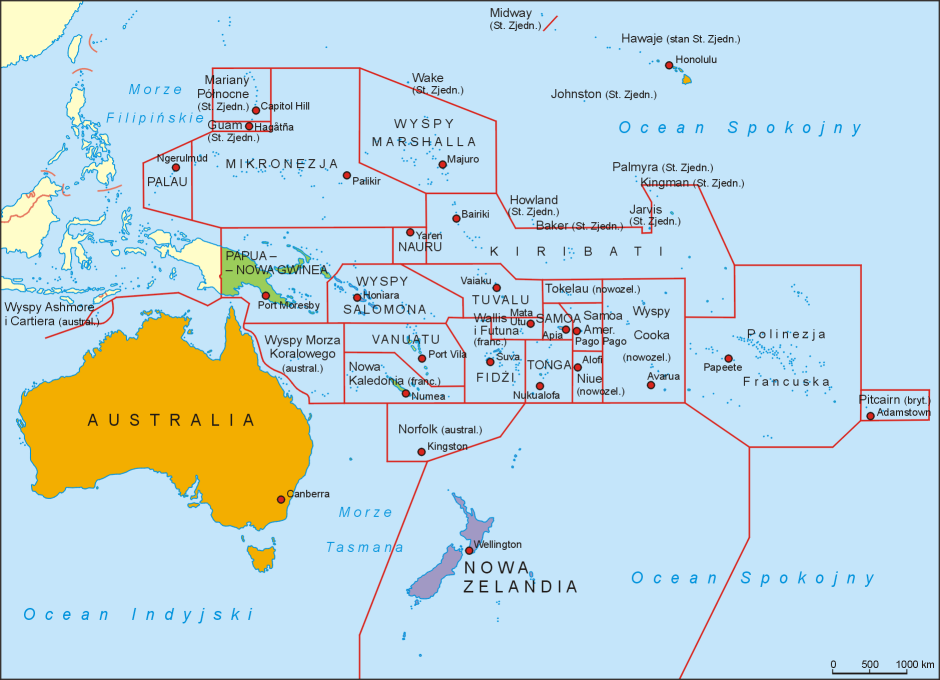
Australia and Oceania (administrative map)

== Melanesia ==
=== Fiji ===
Ship	Flag	Sunk date	Notes	Coordinates
Harriet	United Kingdom	16 July 1837	A whaler wrecked on Providence Reef in the Fiji Islands.	
Tuaikaepau	New Zealand	6 July 1962	A cutter that ran aground on the South Minerva Reef.	23°55′19″S 179°05′34″W

=== New Caledonia ===
Ship	Flag	Sunk date	Notes	Coordinates
I-17	Imperial Japanese Navy	19 August 1943	A Type B1 submarine that was sunk by US aircraft and the Royal New Zealand Navy minesweeper HMNZS Tui south of New Caledonia.	23°26′S 166°50′E

=== Norfolk Island ===
Ship	Flag	Sunk date	Notes	Coordinates
HMS Sirius	Royal Navy	19 March 1790	First Fleet ship that sank on the reef in Slaughter Bay, Norfolk Island, while landing stores	

=== Papua New Guinea ===
Ship	Flag	Sunk date	Notes	Coordinates
USS Amberjack	United States Navy	16 February 1943	A Gato-class submarine sunk by Japanese warships off Rabaul.	05°05′S 152°37′E
Arashio	Imperial Japanese Navy	4 March 1943	An Asashio-class destroyer that was sunk in the Battle of the Bismarck Sea.	07°15′S 148°30′E
USS Argonaut	United States Navy	10 January 1943	A V type submarine sunk by Japanese destroyers off Rabaul.	05°40′14″S 153°54′56″E
USS Brownson	United States Navy	26 December 1943	A Fletcher-class destroyer that was sunk by a Japanese dive bomber aircraft off Cape Gloucester, New Britain.	5°20′S 148°25′E
HMAS Geelong	Royal Australian Navy	18 October 1944	A Bathurst-class corvette that collided with the American tanker York north of Langemak Bay.	6°4′S 147°45′E
Hakaze	Imperial Japanese Navy	23 January 1943	A Japanese Minekaze-class destroyer that was torpedoed by USS Guardfish south of Kavieng, New Ireland.	02°47′S 150°38′E
Hatsukaze	Imperial Japanese Navy	2 November 1943	A Kagerō-class destroyer sunk in Empress Augusta Bay off Bougainville Island by U.S. Navy warships during the Battle of Empress Augusta Bay.	06°01′S 153°58′E
I-2	Imperial Japanese Navy	7 April 1944	A J1 type submarine sunk by the United States Navy destroyer USS Saufley 50 nautical miles (93 km; 58 mi) west-northwest of New Hanover Island.	02°17′S 149°14′E
I-4	Imperial Japanese Navy	21 December 1942	A J1 type submarine torpedoed by the United States Navy submarine USS Seadragon at the southern entrance to St. George's Channel off New Ireland about 20 nautical miles (37 km; 23 mi) from Rabaul.	05°02′S 152°33′E
I-168	Imperial Japanese Navy	27 July 1943	A Kaidai 6 type submarine sunk by the United States Navy submarine USS Scamp 60 nautical miles (110 km; 69 mi) off New Hanover Island.	02°50′S 149°01′E
I-171	Imperial Japanese Navy	1 February 1944	A Kaidai 6 type submarine sunk by the United States Navy destroyers USS Guest and USS Hudson 15 nautical miles (28 km; 17 mi) west of Buka Island in the Solomon Islands Archipelago.	05°37′S 154°14′E
Kako	Imperial Japanese Navy	10 August 1942	A Furutaka-class cruiser torpedoed by the United States Navy submarine USS S-44 off Simbari Island.	02°28′S 152°11′E
Kembu Maru	Japan	3 March 1943	A cargo ship that was sunk by Allied aircraft in the Battle of the Bismarck Sea.	07°15′S 148°30′E
Kyokusei Maru	Imperial Japanese Navy	2 March 1943	A Japanese troopship that was sunk by Allied aircraft in the Battle of the Bismarck Sea.	06°46′S 147°10′E
Macdhui	Australia	18 June 1942	A passenger and cargo ship that was sunk by Japanese aircraft at Port Moresby.	
Makinami	Imperial Japanese Navy	25 November 1943	A Yūgumo-class destroyer sunk by United States Navy destroyers 55 nautical miles (102 km; 63 mi) east-southeast of Cape St. George on New Ireland in the Battle of Cape St. George.	05°14′S 153°50′E
Mamutu	Australia	7 August 1942	A motor vessel sunk by the Imperial Japanese Navy submarine Ro-33 in the Gulf of Papua.	09°11′S 144°12′E
USS McKean	United States Navy	17 November 1943	A Wickes-class destroyer sunk by Japanese aircraft off Bougainville Island.	06°31′S 154°52′E
Mikazuki	Imperial Japanese Navy	28 July 1943	A Japanese Mutsuki-class destroyer that ran aground on a reef off the west coast of New Ireland.	5°27′S 148°25′E
USS Mount Hood	United States Navy	10 November 1944	A Mount Hood-class ammunition ship that exploded in Seeadler Harbor, killing over 300 people and destroying twenty-two smaller boats and landing craft.	2.02833°S 147.355°E
Nojima Maru	Japan	3 March 1943	A troopship ship that was damaged both by aircraft and a collision with the Japanese destroyer Arashio and sank 50 nautical miles (93 km; 58 mi) southeast of Finschafen, New Guinea	07°15′S 148°30′E
Oigawa Maru	Japan	3 March 1943	A troopship that was sunk by the US motor torpedo boats PT-143 and PT-150 in the Battle of the Bismarck Sea.	06°58′S 148°16′E
Okinoshima	Imperial Japanese Navy	12 May 1942	A minelayer that was torpedoed by USS S-42 and sank under tow in Saint George's Channel.	05°06′S 153°48′E
Ōnami	Imperial Japanese Navy	25 November 1943	A Yūgumo-class destroyer torpedoed by United States Navy destroyers between Buka Island and Cape St. George on New Ireland in the Battle of Cape St. George.	05°15′S 153°49′E
Ōshio	Imperial Japanese Navy	20 February 1943	An Asashio-class destroyer that was torpedoed by USS Albacore 70 nautical miles (130 km; 81 mi) northeast of Manus Island.	00°50′S 146°06′E
Pruth	United Kingdom	31 December 1923	A steamship that was wrecked on Natara Reef, off Port Moresby.	
Ro-33	Imperial Japanese Navy	29 August 1942	A Japanese Ro-33-class submarine that was sunk by HMAS Arunta off Port Moresby.	09°36′S 147°06′E
Ro-104	Imperial Japanese Navy	23 May 1944	A Ro-100-class submarine sunk by the United States Navy destroyer escort USS England north of the Admiralty Islands.	01°26′N 149°20′E
Ro-105	Imperial Japanese Navy	31 May 1944	A Ro-100-class submarine sunk by the United States Navy destroyer escort USS England north of the Admiralty Islands.	00°47′N 149°56′E
Ro-106	Imperial Japanese Navy	22 May 1944	A Ro-100-class submarine sunk by the United States Navy destroyer escort USS England north of the Admiralty Islands.	01°40′N 150°31′E
Ro-108	Imperial Japanese Navy	26 May 1944	A Ro-100-class submarine sunk by the United States Navy destroyer escort USS England north of the Admiralty Islands.	00°32′S 148°35′E
Ro-111	Imperial Japanese Navy	10 June 1944	A Ro-100-class submarine sunk by the United States Navy destroyer USS Taylor north of the Admiralty Islands.	00°26′N 149°16′E
Ro-116	Imperial Japanese Navy	24 May 1944	A Ro-100-class submarine sunk by the United States Navy destroyer escort USS England north of the Admiralty Islands.	00°53′N 149°14′E
USS S-39	United States Navy	13 August 1942	An S-class submarine that ran aground off Rossel Island.	11°21′02.74″S 154°08′56.51″E
Sendai	Imperial Japanese Navy	2 November 1943	A Sendai-class light cruiser sunk in Empress Augusta Bay off Bougainville Island by U.S. Navy warships during the Battle of Empress Augusta Bay.	06°10′S 154°20′E
Shimakaze	Imperial Japanese Navy	12 January 1943	A Minekaze-class destroyer that was torpedoed by the United States Navy submarine USS Guardfish near Kavieng, New Ireland.	02°51′S 149°43′E
Shirayuki	Imperial Japanese Navy	3 March 1943	A Fubuki-class destroyer that was sunk by Allied aircraft 55 nautical miles (102 km; 63 mi) southeast of Finschhafen, Papua New Guinea.	07°15′S 148°30′E
Sin-ai Maru	Japan	3 March 1943	A troopship that was sunk by Allied aircraft in the Battle of the Bismarck Sea.	07°15′S 148°30′E
Taimei Maru	Japan	3 March 1943	A troopship that was sunk by Allied aircraft in the Battle of the Bismarck Sea.	07°15′S 148°30′E
Tenryū	Imperial Japanese Navy	19 December 1942	A Japanese Tenryū-class cruiser that was torpedoed by USS Albacore off Madang.	05°12′S 145°56′E
W-26	Imperial Japanese Navy	17 February 1944	A Japanese W-19-class minesweeper that was bombed by American aircraft at Karavia Bay, New Britain.	
Yayoi	Imperial Japanese Navy	10 August 1926	A Kamikaze-class destroyer sunk as a target by Japanese aircraft off the Oki Islands.	
Yūgiri	Imperial Japanese Navy	26 November 1943	A Japanese Fubuki-class destroyer that was sunk in the Battle of Cape St. George.	04°44′S 154°0′E

== Micronesia ==
=== Federated States of Micronesia ===
Ship	Flag	Sunk date	Notes	Coordinates
Agano	Imperial Japanese Navy	15 February 1944	An Agano-class cruiser that was torpedoed by the United States Navy submarine USS Skate 160 nautical miles (296 km; 184 mi) north of Truk.	10°11′N 151°42′E
Aikoku Maru	Imperial Japanese Navy	17 February 1944	An armed merchantman that was sunk during Operation Hailstone. The remains of 400 men were recovered from the wreck and cremated in 1984.	07°22′N 151°56′E
Fujikawa Maru	Imperial Japanese Navy	17 February 1944	An armed aircraft transport that was sunk during Operation Hailstone	
Fumizuki	Imperial Japanese Navy	18 February 1944	A Japanese Mutsuki-class destroyer that was sunk during Operation Hailstone.	07°24′N 151°44′E
Heian Maru	Imperial Japanese Navy	17 February 1944	A Japanese submarine tender that was sunk during Operation Hailstone.	
I-169	Imperial Japanese Navy	4 April 1944	A Japanese Kaidai-class submarine that participated in the attack on Pearl Harbor, and sank northwest of Dublon, when it flooded while diving to avoid an air-raid.	
Planet	Germany	7 October 1914	A survey ship that was scuttled to prevent capture.	
Sankisan Maru	Japan		A Japanese freighter that was sunk during Operation Hailstone.	
Shinkoko Maru	Japan		A Japanese oil tanker that was sunk during Operation Hailstone.	
Tachikaze	Imperial Japanese Navy	18 February 1944	A Japanese Minekaze-class destroyer that ran aground at Kuop Atoll on 4 February 1944, and remained stranded until it was sunk in Operation Hailstone.	07°03′N 151°56′E
Umikaze	Imperial Japanese Navy	1 February 1944	A Japanese Shiratsuyu-class destroyer that was torpedoed by USS Guardfish south of Chuuk.	07°10′N 151°43′E

=== Guam ===
Ship	Flag	Sunk date	Notes	Coordinates
USS Acadia	United States Navy	20 September 2010	A Yellowstone-class destroyer tender sunk as a target off Guam.	
Aratama Maru	Imperial Japanese Navy	1944	An Imperial Japanese Navy transport sunk in Talofofo Bay.	
SMS Cormoran	Imperial German Navy	7 April 1917	A German steamer scuttled in Apra Harbor to avoid capture at the start of American involvement in World War I.	13°27′33″N 144°39′15″E
Kitsugawa Maru	Japan		A Japanese merchant freighter sunk by torpedo in Apra Harbor.	
Tokai Maru	Imperial Japanese Navy	1943	An Imperial Japanese Navy armed transport sunk in Apra Harbor.	

=== Kiribati ===
Ship	Flag	Sunk date	Notes	Coordinates
Canton	United States		A whaling ship that ran aground at Kanton Island.	
Golden Sunset	United Kingdom	1866	A British barque that ran aground at Enderbury Island.	
Norwich City	United Kingdom	29 November 1929	A British freighter that ran aground at Nikumaroro.	4°39′39″S 174°32′40″W
President Taylor	United States Army	14 February 1942	After carrying two companies of infantry and two battalions of coast artillery, about 1,100 men, for the Canton (Kanton) Island garrison, and possibly due to loss of an anchor while landing troops and equipment by means of shallow draft craft from outside the lagoon, the ship became firmly grounded on the coral reef. The hull was eventually scrapped by 6 April 1955.	

=== Marshall Islands ===
Ship	Flag	Sunk date	Notes	Coordinates
USS Anderson	United States Navy	1 July 1946	A Sims-class destroyer that was sunk at Bikini Atoll in an atomic bomb test.	
USS Apogon	United States Navy	25 July 1946	A Balao-class submarine that was sunk at Bikini Atoll in an atomic bomb test, Operation Crossroads.	
USS Arkansas	United States Navy	25 July 1946	A Wyoming-class battleship that was sunk at Bikini Atoll in an atomic bomb test.	
USS Barrow	United States Navy	11 May 1948	A Gilliam-class attack transport that sustained heavy damage in atomic bomb tests and was scuttled off Kwajalein.	
USS Carlisle	United States Navy	1 July 1946	A Gilliam-class attack transport that was sunk at Bikini Atoll in an atomic bomb test.	
USS Gilliam	United States Navy	1 July 1946	A Gilliam-class attack transport that was sunk at Bikini Atoll in an atomic bomb test.	
Kembu Maru	Japan	4 December 1943	A Japanese freighter that was sunk by US aircraft at Kwajalein Atoll.	09°19′N 167°25′E
USS Lamson	United States Navy	2 July 1946	A Mahan-class destroyer that was sunk at Bikini Atoll in an atomic bomb test.	
USS LST-545	United States Navy	12 May 1948	An LST-542-class tank landing ship that was sunk at Enewetak Atoll in an atomic bomb test.	
USS LST-661	United States Navy	25 July 1948	An LST-542-class tank landing ship that was sunk at Enewetak Atoll in an atomic bomb test.	
Nagato	Imperial Japanese Navy	30 July 1946	A Japanese Nagato-class battleship that sustained heavy damage in an atomic bomb test at Bikini Atoll, and capsized and sank five days later.	
USS Pennsylvania	United States Navy	10 February 1948	A Pennsylvania-class super-dreadnought battleship, that was sunk off Kwajalein after atomic bomb tests.	
USS Pilotfish	United States Navy	25 July 1946	A Balao-class submarine that sunk at Bikini Atoll in an atomic bomb test.	30°26′N 140°53′E
Prinz Eugen	Kriegsmarine	22 December 1946	A German Admiral Hipper-class heavy cruiser that was damaged at Bikini Atoll by atomic bomb tests, and later towed to Kwajalein where it capsized and sunk.	8°45′9.85″N 167°40′59.16″E
Sakawa	Imperial Japanese Navy	2 July 1946	A Japanese Agano-class cruiser that sustained heavy damage in an atomic bomb test at Bikini Atoll, and sank the following day.	11°35′N 165°23′E
USS Saratoga	United States Navy	25 July 1946	A Lexington-class aircraft carrier that was sunk at Bikini Atoll in an atomic bomb test.	11°34′53.33″N 165°29′54.78″E
Toreshima Maru	Imperial Japanese Navy	December 1943	A Japanese supply ship sunk at Maloelap Atoll off Taroa Island by US Navy.	

=== Palau ===
Ship	Flag	Sunk date	Notes	Coordinates
Amatsu Maru	Japan	31 March 1944	A Japanese tanker that was sunk during Operation Desecrate One.	
Bichu Maru	Japan	30 March 1944	A Japanese freighter that was sunk during Operation Desecrate One.	
Chuyo Maru	Imperial Japanese Army	31 March 1944	A Japanese freighter (army cargo vessel) that was sunk during Operation Desecrate One.	
Gozan Maru	Imperial Japanese Army	30 March 1944	A Japanese troopship that was sunk during Operation Desecrate One.	
Irō	Imperial Japanese Army	31 March 1944	A Japanese Notoro-class oil tanker that was sunk during Operation Desecrate One. She was the sister ship of Sata.	
Kamikaze Maru	Imperial Japanese Army	31 March 1944	A Japanese troopship that was sunk during Operation Desecrate One.	
Kibi Maru	Imperial Japanese Army	31 March 1944	A Japanese freighter (army cargo vessel) that was sunk during Operation Desecrate One.	
Nagisan Maru	Imperial Japanese Army	31 March 1944	A Japanese freighter (army cargo vessel) that was sunk during Operation Desecrate One.	
USS Perry	United States Navy	13 September 1944	A Clemson-class destroyer that was sunk by a naval mine off Angaur.	6°53′N 134°10′E
Raizan Maru	Imperial Japanese Army	31 March 1944	A Japanese freighter (army cargo vessel) that was sunk during Operation Desecrate One.	
Ryuko Maru	Imperial Japanese Army	31 March 1944	A Japanese freighter (army cargo vessel) that was sunk during Operation Desecrate One.	
Samidare	Imperial Japanese Army	25 August 1944	A Japanese Shiratsuyu-class destroyer that was torpedoed by USS Batfish after running aground on Velasco Reef.	8°10′N 134°38′E
Sata	Imperial Japanese Army	31 March 1944	A Japanese Notoro-class oil tanker that was sunk during Operation Desecrate One. She was a sister ship of Irō.	
Teshio Maru	Imperial Japanese Army	31 March 1944	A Japanese freighter (army cargo vessel) that was sunk during Operation Desecrate One.	
Urakami Maru	Imperial Japanese Army	31 March 1944	A Japanese repair ship that was sunk during Operation Desecrate One.	
Wakatake	Imperial Japanese Army	30 March 1944	A Japanese Wakatake-class destroyer that was sunk during Operation Desecrate One.	7°50′N 134°20′E

=== Wake Island ===
Ship	Flag	Sunk date	Notes	Coordinates
Dashing Wave	United Kingdom	31 August 1870	A British tea clipper that struck a reef and sank.	
Hayate	Imperial Japanese Navy	11 December 1941	A Japanese destroyer sunk by US Marines.	19°10′N 166°22′E
Kisaragi	Imperial Japanese Navy	11 December 1941	A Japanese destroyer sunk by US Marines.	18°55′N 166°17′E
Libelle	Bremen	4 March 1866	A German barque that shipwrecked on the eastern reef during a gale.	

== New Zealand ==
Ship	Flag	Sunk date	Notes	Coordinates
Anjou	France	5 February 1905	A barque that struck rocks off the Auckland Islands.	50.777075°S 165.887516°E
Arahura	New Zealand	24 January 1952	A passenger and cargo steamer that was sunk for target practice in Cook Strait.	
Boyd	United Kingdom	October 1809	A brigantine that was attacked by Maori warriors at Whangaroa. The ship was destroyed by fire during the resulting Boyd massacre.	
HMS Buffalo	Royal Navy	28 July 1840	A storeship that was wrecked in a storm in Mercury Bay, with two lives lost.	36°49′36.20″S 175°42′20.00″E
HMNZS Canterbury	Royal New Zealand Navy	3 November 2007	A Leander-class frigate that was scuttled as a dive wreck in the Bay of Islands.	35.1938°S 174.2944°E
Cowan	New Zealand	9 March 1948	A wooden steam trawler that struck rocks in Lyttelton Harbour.	
Darra	New Zealand	1951	A tea clipper, later used as a coal hulk, intentionally beached in Lyttelton Harbour.	
Derry Castle	United Kingdom	20 March 1887	A barque that ran aground on Enderby Island.	50.484323°S 166.302761°E
Dolphin	New Zealand	9 December 1862	A cutter wrecked near Quail Island, Lyttelton Harbour, New Zealand	
Dundonald	United Kingdom	7 March 1907	A barque that was wrecked in a storm off Disappointment Island, where the survivors remained for seven months until rescued.	50.607938°S 165.954817°E
Elingamite	Australia	5 November 1902	A steamship that struck West Island (one of the Three Kings Islands) and sank within 20 minutes.	34.186047°S 172.031590°E
England's Glory	United Kingdom	7 November 1881	By getting too close in while waiting the arrival of the pilot.	off Nelson
Endeavour II	Canada	22 February 1971	A three-masted auxiliary barque driven onto the bar of Parengarenga Harbour, a few miles south of North Cape. There were no fatalities amongst the crew of thirteen men and one woman.	34.521762°S 173.010206°E
General Grant	United States	14 May 1866	A barque that drifted into a cave on the western shore of the Auckland Islands and sank.	
Holmbank	New Zealand	21 September 1963	A coastal trading vessel that was lost off Banks Peninsula	
Holmglen	New Zealand	24 November 1959	A coastal trading vessel that was lost off Timaru.	44.5223°S 171.6894°E
Hydrabad	United Kingdom	24 June 1878	A cargo and passenger sailing ship that was beached in the North Island in a storm.	
Kaitawa	New Zealand	24 May 1966	A collier that capsized near Cape Reinga.	
Mikhail Lermontov	Soviet Union	16 February 1986	A Soviet passenger liner that ran aground in the Marlborough Sounds.	41.042087°S 174.219496°E
RMS Niagara	United Kingdom	19 June 1940	An ocean liner that struck a mine and sank off Bream Head while carrying a secret consignment of gold from the Bank of England.	35°51′50″S 174°56′38″E
Novelty	New Zealand	1877	A steam ship wrecked off Quail Island, Lyttelton Harbour, New Zealand	
HMS Orpheus	Royal Navy	7 February 1863	A Jason-class corvette that ran aground on the Manukau Heads, with 189 lives lost.	37°04.1′S 174°28.3′E
Penguin	New Zealand	12 February 1909	A ferry that foundered off Cape Terawhiti.	
Port Kembla	New Zealand	18 September 1917	A cargo ship that was sunk by a mine off Farewell Spit.	
HMNZS Puriri	Royal New Zealand Navy	14 May 1941	A coastal cargo boat that was converted into a minesweeper, and hit a mine off Bream Head 25 days after being commissioned.	35°46′15″S 174°43′00″E
Queen Bee	United Kingdom	7 August 1877	A barque that ran aground on Farewell Spit.	40°30′00″S 172°52′00″E
Rainbow Warrior	Netherlands	2 December 1987	A fishing trawler that was purchased by Greenpeace in 1978 for use as a fundraising and protest ship. She was sabotaged and sunk by the French secret service at Auckland on 10 July 1985, and although later refloated, was found to be beyond repair and finally scuttled in Matauri Bay.	34.9748°S 173.9349°E
Rena	Liberia	5 October 2011	A container ship that ran aground on Astrolabe Reef, resulting in New Zealand's worst oil spill. The wreck broke apart and sank in January 2012.	37°32′25″S 176°25′45″E
HMS Sandfly	Royal Navy	1868	A passenger paddle steamer used as a gunboat during the New Zealand Wars. In 1865 she reverted to civilian use and became Tasmanian Maid, before being wrecked off New Plymouth.	
Sydney Packet	Australia	17 July 1837	A schooner that was wrecked in a storm off Moeraki, Otago.	
Tararua	New Zealand	29 April 1881	A passenger steamer that struck a reef off Waipapa Point and sank the next day, claiming over 100 victims.	46.6686°S 168.8622°E
HMS Torch	Royal Navy	17 November 1924	An Alert-class sloop that ran aground in the Chatham Islands.	
Torrington	Australia	27 June 1851	A brig wrecked in a storm in Lyttelton Harbour	
HMNZS Tui	Royal New Zealand Navy	February 1999	An oceanographic survey and research ship that was scuttled as a dive wreck.	35.5832°S 174.5394°E
Victory		3 July 1861	A steamship that ran aground off Otago Peninsula.	45.8425°S 170.7321°E
Wahine	New Zealand	10 April 1968	A passenger ferry that ran aground and capsized, with 51 lives lost.	
HMNZS Waikato	Royal New Zealand Navy	18 December 2000	A Leander-class frigate that was scuttled off Tutukata as an artificial reef.	35.6528°S 174.5445°E
Wairarapa	New Zealand	29 October 1894	A luxury steamer that hit a reef off Great Barrier Island.	36.0674°S 175.3519°E
HMNZS Wellington	Royal New Zealand Navy	13 November 2005	A Leander-class frigate that was scuttled off the coast of Wellington.	41°21.18′S 174°46.80′E
William and John	New Zealand	27 June 1851	A 10-ton cutter wrecked in a storm in Lyttelton Harbour	

== Polynesia ==
=== French Polynesia ===
Ship	Flag	Sunk date	Notes	Coordinates
Lady of St Kilda	United Kingdom		A schooner that was wrecked sometime shortly after 1843.	

=== Hawaii ===
Ship	Flag	Sunk date	Notes	Coordinates
USS Admiral W. L. Capps	United States Navy			
USS Arizona	United States Navy	7 December 1941	A battleship lost in the Japanese bombing of Pearl Harbor.	21.364775°N 157.950112°W
USS Barbero	United States Navy	7 October 1964	A Balao-class submarine sunk as a target off Pearl Harbor.	
Bering	Russia	January 1815	The Russian-American Company ship (also spelled Behring; formerly Atahualpa, an American maritime fur trade vessel) wrecked at Waimea Bay, Oahu.	
USS Carbonero	United States Navy	27 April 1975	A Balao-class submarine sunk as a target.	
Carrier Dove	United States	21 November 1921	A schooner that struck a reef off Molokai.	
Carthaginian II	United States	December 2005	A sailing boat that was sunk as an artificial reef.	20°51′45.8″N 156°40′30.7″W
Cleopatra's Barge	Hawaii	6 April 1824	The royal yacht of King Kamehameha II that ran aground in Hanalei Bay.	
USS Darter	United States Navy	7 January 1992	A submarine that was disabled in a collision with Kansas Getty, and sunk as a target off Pearl Harbor.	
Ehime Maru	Japan	9 February 2001	A Japanese fishery high school training ship sank about 9 nautical miles (17 km) off the south coast of Oahu, after a collision with United States Navy submarine USS Greeneville. Nine of its crewmembers were killed, including four high school students.	
I-18	Imperial Japanese Navy		A Japanese midget submarine depth-charged at Pearl Harbor.	
I-401	Imperial Japanese Navy	31 May 1946	An I-400-class submarine that was sunk as a target off Kalaeloa.	
Kad’yak	Russia	1816	The Russian-American Company ship (also spelled Kad’iak and Kodiak; formerly Myrtle), wrecked at Honolulu Harbor, Oahu.	
USS LST-480	United States Navy	21 May 1944	A tank landing ship sunk following the West Loch Disaster in Pearl Harbor.	
USNS Mission San Miguel	United States Navy	8 October 1957	A fleet oiler run aground on Maro Reef.	
USS S-28	United States Navy	4 July 1944	An S-class submarine that sunk off Oahu.	
USS Saginaw	United States Navy	29 October 1870	A sloop-of-war that ran aground off Kure Atoll.	
San Pedro	United States	1996	Sunk by Atlantis Submarines Hawaii as an artificial reef.	
USS Stickleback	United States Navy	29 May 1958	A Balao-class submarine sunk in a collision with USS Silverstein.	
USS Tinosa	United States Navy	November 1960	A Gato-class submarine that was scuttled after being used as an anti-submarine warfare target.	
USS Utah	United States Navy	7 December 1941	A former battleship converted to a training and target ship lost in the Japanese bombing of Pearl Harbor.	21°22′8″N 157°57′45″W
YO-257	United States Navy	1989	Sunk by Atlantis Submarines Hawaii as an artificial reef.	

=== Pitcairn Islands ===
Ship	Flag	Sunk date	Notes	Coordinates
Acadia		5 June 1881	A mail ship that was wrecked on Ducie Island.	
Bowdon		April 1893	A ship that was wrecked on Oeno Island.	
Cornwallis		23 January 1875	A ship that was wrecked on Pitcairn Island.	
Khandeish		25 September 1875	A ship that was wrecked on Oeno Island.	
Oregon		23 August 1883	A ship that was wrecked on Oeno Island.	
Wild Wave		5 March 1858	A 1,500-ton clipper ship that was wrecked on Oeno Island.	

=== Samoa ===
Ship	Flag	Sunk date	Notes	Coordinates
SMS Adler	Imperial German Navy	16 March 1889	A gunboat that was wrecked in the 1889 Apia cyclone.	13.8266°S 171.7647°W
SMS Eber	Imperial German Navy	16 March 1889	A warship that was wrecked in the 1889 Apia cyclone.	13°49′53″S 171°45′07″W
Staghound	British Australian colony	21 November 1862	Drove ashore during a gale.	
USS Trenton	United States Navy	16 March 1889	A warship that was wrecked in the 1889 Apia cyclone.	

== Solomon Islands ==
Ship	Flag	Sunk date	Notes	Coordinates
USS Chicago	United States Navy	30 January 1943	The Northampton-class heavy cruiser was sunk at the Battle of Rennell Island.	11°25′S 160°56′E
USS Helena	United States Navy	6 July 1943	The St. Louis-class light cruiser was sunk at the Battle of Kula Gulf.	7°46′0″S 157°11′0″E
Jintsū	Imperial Japanese Navy	13 July 1943	The Japanese Sendai-class light cruiser was sunk at the Battle of Kolombangara.	07°38′S 157°06′E
USS Juneau	United States Navy	13 November 1942	The Atlanta-class light cruiser was sunk at the Naval Battle of Guadalcanal.	10°34′S 161°04′E
Ro-34	Imperial Japanese Navy	5 April 1943	The Japanese Kaichū type submarine was sunk by USS O'Bannon and USS Strong off the Russell Islands.	08°15′S 158°58′E
Toa Maru	Imperial Japanese Navy	3 February 1943	A Japanese military transport sunk at Ghizo Island	
Yūgumo	Imperial Japanese Navy	7 October 1943	The Japanese Yūgumo-class destroyer was sunk at the Naval Battle of Vella Lavella.	07°33′S 156°14′E
Yura	Imperial Japanese Navy	25 October 1942	The Japanese Nagara-class light cruiser was bombed by US aircraft and scuttled off Savo Island.	08°15′S 159°07′E

=== Ironbottom Sound ===
Ironbottom Sound is the name given to the stretch of water between Guadalcanal and the Florida Islands (Nggela Islands) because of the many ships and planes that sank there during the Guadalcanal Campaign in 1942–43.

Ship	Flag	Sunk date	Notes	Coordinates
USS Aaron Ward	United States Navy	7 April 1943	The Gleaves-class destroyer was sunk by Japanese aircraft during Operation I-Go.	9°10′30″S 160°12′0″E
Akatsuki	Imperial Japanese Navy	13 November 1942	The Japanese Akatsuki-class destroyer was sunk at the Naval Battle of Guadalcanal.	09°17′S 159°56′E
USS Astoria	United States Navy	9 August 1942	The New Orleans-class heavy cruiser was sunk at the Battle of Savo Island.	9°12′33″S 159°52′3″E
USS Atlanta	United States Navy	13 November 1942	The Atlanta-class anti-aircraft cruiser was sunk at the Naval Battle of Guadalcanal.	9.390°S 159.979°E
Ayanami	Imperial Japanese Navy	15 November 1942	The Japanese Fubuki-class destroyer was sunk by gunfire from USS Washington.	9°10′S 159°52′E
USS Barton	United States Navy	13 November 1942	The Benson-class destroyer was struck by torpedoes from the Japanese destroyer Akatsuki.	
HMAS Canberra	Royal Australian Navy	9 August 1942	The Kent-class cruiser was scuttled after taking damage at the Battle of Savo Island.	9°12′29″S 159°54′46″E
USS Colhoun	United States Navy	30 August 1942	The Wickes-class destroyer was sunk by Japanese aircraft.	09°24′S 160°01′E
USS Cushing	United States Navy	13 November 1942	The Mahan-class destroyer was sunk at the Naval Battle of Guadalcanal.	
USS De Haven	United States Navy	1 February 1943	The Fletcher-class destroyer was sunk by Japanese bomber aircraft during Operation Ke.	9°9′S 159°52′E
USS Duncan	United States Navy	12 October 1942	The Gleaves-class destroyer was sunk after taking damage in the Battle of Cape Esperance.	
Fubuki	Imperial Japanese Navy	11 October 1942	The Japanese Fubuki-class destroyer was sunk at the Battle of Cape Esperance.	09°06′S 159°38′E
Furutaka	Imperial Japanese Navy	12 October 1942	The Japanese Furutaka-class cruiser was sunk at the Battle of Cape Esperance.	09°02′S 159°33′E
USS George F. Elliott	United States Navy	8 August 1942	The Heywood-class attack transport was sunk by Mitsubishi G4M bomber aircraft.	9°20′45″S 160°8′14″E
USS Gregory	United States Navy	5 September 1942	The Wickes-class destroyer was sunk by the Japanese destroyers Yūdachi, Hatsuyuki, and Murakumo.	
Hiei	Imperial Japanese Navy	14 November 1942	The Japanese Kongō-class battleship was scuttled after taking damage at the Naval Battle of Guadalcanal.	9°00′00″S 158°59′59″E
Hirokawa Maru	Imperial Japanese Navy		A Japanese military transport.	
USS Jarvis	United States Navy	9 August 1942	The Gridley-class destroyer was sunk by Japanese aircraft.	9°42′S 158°59′E
USS John Penn	United States Navy	13 August 1943	The attack transport was sunk by Japanese aircraft off Lunga Point.	
Kasi Maru	Imperial Japanese Navy	2 July 1943	The Japanese auxiliary minelayer/merchant ship, sunk in Mbaeroko Bay, near Munda, during a bombing raid by American B-25 bomber aircraft.	8°06′S 157°20′E
USS Kanawha	United States Navy	8 April 1943	The Kanawha-class fleet replenishment oiler was sunk by Japanese Aichi D3A aircraft.	
Kinugawa Maru	Imperial Japanese Navy		A Japanese military transport.	
Kirishima	Imperial Japanese Navy	15 November 1942	The Japanese Kongō-class battleship was sunk by USS Washington.	9°05′S 159°42′E
USS Laffey	United States Navy	13 November 1942	The Benson-class destroyer that was sunk at the Naval Battle of Guadalcanal.	
USS Little	United States Navy	5 September 1942	The Wickes-class destroyer was sunk by the Japanese destroyers Yūdachi, Hatsuyuki, and Murakumo.	
Makigumo	Imperial Japanese Navy	1 February 1942	The Japanese Yūgumo-class destroyer was scuttled after striking a naval mine.	09°15′S 159°47′E
HMNZS Moa	Royal New Zealand Navy	7 April 1943	The Bird-class minesweeper was sunk by Japanese aircraft.	
USS Monssen	United States Navy	13 November 1942	The Gleaves-class destroyer was sunk at the Naval Battle of Guadalcanal.	
USS Northampton	United States Navy	30 November 1942	The Northampton-class heavy cruiser was sunk at the Battle of Tassafaronga.	09°12′S 159°50′E
USS Preston	United States Navy	14 November 1942	The Mahan-class destroyer was sunk at the Naval Battle of Guadalcanal.	
PT-37	United States Navy		American PT boats	
PT-44	United States Navy		American PT boats	
PT-111	United States Navy		American PT boats	
PT-112	United States Navy		American PT boats	
PT-123	United States Navy		American PT boats	
USS Quincy	United States Navy	9 August 1942	The New Orleans-class cruiser was sunk at the Battle of Savo Island.	9°4′32″S 159°58′30″E
USS Seminole	United States Navy	25 October 1942	The Navajo-class oceangoing tug was sunk off Tulagi by Japanese destroyers.	9°23′0″S 160°13′14″E
USS Serpens	United States Coast Guard	29 January 1945	The United States Coast Guard-crewed Liberty ship that exploded while anchored off Lunga Beach.	
Takanami	Imperial Japanese Navy	30 November 1942	The Yūgumo-class destroyer was sunk at the Battle of Tassafaronga.	9.23°S 159.82°E
Tama Maru	Imperial Japanese Navy	6 May 1942	Significantly damaged north of Savo Island on 4 May 1942 by Douglas TBD Devastators from USS Yorktown.	
Teruzuki	Imperial Japanese Navy	12 December 1942	The Akizuki-class destroyer was torpedoed by PT-37 and PT-40.	9°13′S 159°46′E
USS Vincennes	United States Navy	9 August 1942	The New Orleans-class cruiser was sunk at the Battle of Savo Island.	9°7′17″S 159°52′48″E
USS Walke	United States Navy	15 November 1942	The Sims-class destroyer was sunk at the Naval Battle of Guadalcanal.	
World Discoverer	Liberia	30 April 2000	The cruise ship struck a reef in the Sandfly Passage and ran aground in Roderick Bay.	9°01′23.17″S 160°07′22.91″E
YP-284	United States Navy		An American yard patrol craft.	
Yūdachi	Imperial Japanese Navy	13 November 1942	The Japanese Shiratsuyu-class destroyer was sunk at the Naval Battle of Guadalcanal.	09°14′S 159°52′E
