= List of shipwrecks in 1948 =

The list of shipwrecks in 1948 includes ships sunk, foundered, grounded, or otherwise lost during 1948.

table of contents
1948
Jan	Feb	Mar	Apr
May	Jun	Jul	Aug
Sep	Oct	Nov	Dec
Unknown date

== January ==
=== 2 January ===
List of shipwrecks: 2 January 1948
Ship	State	Description
Silvia Onorato	Italy	The cargo ship ran aground on the Goodwin Sands and broke her back.

=== 3 January ===
List of shipwrecks: 3 January 1948
Ship	State	Description
Lynn Trader	United Kingdom	The coaster ran aground in Bridlington Bay, Yorkshire.

=== 6 January ===
List of shipwrecks: 6 January 1948
Ship	State	Description
City of London	United Kingdom	The cargo ship ran aground 20 nautical miles (37 km) north west of Margate, Kent. Refloated the next day.

=== 7 January ===
List of shipwrecks: 7 January 1948
Ship	State	Description
Teasel	United Kingdom	The coaster ran aground near Holyhead, Anglesey.

=== 9 January ===
List of shipwrecks: 9 January 1948
Ship	State	Description
Podolsk	Soviet Union	The cargo ship ran aground on the Amherst Rocks in the Yangtze Estuary 60 nautical miles (110 km) from Wusong, China. She sank two days later.

=== 11 January ===
List of shipwrecks: 11 January 1948
Ship	State	Description
Veni	Norway	The cargo ship ran aground on Balach Rocks, Islay, Inner Hebrides, United Kingdom whilst on a voyage from Leith, Midlothian to Sfax, Tunisia.

=== 12 January ===
List of shipwrecks: 12 January 1948
Ship	State	Description
Joseph V. Connolly	United States Army	The Liberty ship caught fire in the Atlantic Ocean 900 nautical miles (1,700 km) east of New York and was abandoned. She sank on 29 January at 40°47′N 52°48′W.

=== 16 January ===
List of shipwrecks: 16 January 1948
Ship	State	Description
Svein Jarl	Norway	The cargo ship struck a mine and sank off Patras, Greece. Nine crew were killed.

=== 18 January ===
List of shipwrecks: 18 January 1948
Ship	State	Description
Sierra Cordoba	United Kingdom	The passenger ship ran aground off Fanø, Denmark (55°50′N 7°33′E).

=== 19 January ===
List of shipwrecks: 19 January 1948
Ship	State	Description
Oriana	United Kingdom	The Modified-Stella type tug struck a mine and sank off Clacton-on-Sea, Essex. She was towing the minesweeper D. 366 (Royal Navy) from Chatham, Kent to Brightlingsea, Essex.

=== 21 January ===
List of shipwrecks: 21 January 1948
Ship	State	Description
Argo	Norway	The cargo ship struck a mine and sank whilst on a voyage from Venice, Italy to Rijeka, Yugoslavia. Eleven crew were killed.

=== 30 January ===
List of shipwrecks: 30 January 1948
Ship	State	Description
Toxteth	United Kingdom	The tug collided with Basis (Norway) in the River Mersey. She capsized and sank with the loss of all four crew.

=== 31 January ===
List of shipwrecks: 31 January 1948
Ship	State	Description
Samkey	United Kingdom	The Liberty ship was presumed to have foundered in the Atlantic Ocean. Last reported position 41°48′N 24°00′W.

== February ==
=== 3 February ===
List of shipwrecks: 3 February 1948
Ship	State	Description
DD-934	United States Navy	The captured Akizuki-class destroyer, formerly Hanazuki (Imperial Japanese Navy), was sunk as a target by United States Navy forces off Japan's Gotō Islands.
USS Trippe	United States Navy	The decommissioned Benham-class destroyer was sunk as a gunnery target in the Pacific Ocean off Kwajalein after use as a target in the 1946 Operation Crossroads atomic bomb tests.

=== 6 February ===
List of shipwrecks: 6 February 1948
Ship	State	Description
Gertrude L. Thebaud	United States	The fishing schooner sank off the coast of La Guaira, Venezuela.

=== 10 February ===
List of shipwrecks: 10 February 1948
Ship	State	Description
USS Pennsylvania	United States Navy	USS Pennsylvania sinking. The decommissioned Pennsylvania-class battleship was sunk as a target in the Pacific Ocean off Kwajalein after use as a target in the 1946 Operation Crossroads atomic bomb tests.

=== 12 February ===
List of shipwrecks: 12 February 1948
Ship	State	Description
Soegio	Netherlands	The tug struck a mine and sank in Macassar Strait off Borneo 2°36′S 116°33′E`.

=== 16 February ===
List of shipwrecks: 16 February 1948
Ship	State	Description
USS Banner	United States Navy	The Gilliam-class attack transport was scuttled in the Pacific Ocean off Kwajalein, Marshall Islands, after use as a target in the Operation Crossroads atomic bomb tests of 1946.

=== 18 February ===
List of shipwrecks: 18 February 1948
Ship	State	Description
Amoy	Tunisia	The Tunis-registered cargo ship, converted from HMS Sandwich of 1928, foundered outside Port La Nouvelle, on a voyage from Oran to Sète with a cargo of oranges.

=== 23 February ===
List of shipwrecks: 23 February 1948
Ship	State	Description
D L Co. No. XLIX	United States	The 297-gross register ton, 110.1-foot (33.6 m) scow was wrecked on Makchanik Island (56°20′N 157°49′W) in Chignik Bay (56.2956°N 158.4015°W) on the south coast of the Alaska Peninsula in the Territory of Alaska.

=== 24 February ===
List of shipwrecks: 24 February 1948
Ship	State	Description
Baltic Queen	United Kingdom	The cargo ship collided with Hembury (Brazil) in the River Mersey and sank. All 25 crew were rescued.

=== 27 February ===
List of shipwrecks: 27 February 1948
Ship	State	Description
Virtu	United Kingdom	The cargo ship was driven ashore between Bardia and Tobruk, Libya. She was later refloated and towed to Tobruk, where she was scrapped.

=== 28 February ===
List of shipwrecks: 28 February 1948
Ship	State	Description
USS Corundum	United States Army	The Trefoil-class concrete barge was scuttled in Agat Bay, Guam.

=== 29 February ===
List of shipwrecks: 29 February 1948
Ship	State	Description
Cecil G. Sellers	United States	The Liberty ship caught fire south west of the Cocos Islands and was abandoned. She was declared a total loss and was consequently scrapped in 1950.

=== Unknown date ===
List of shipwrecks: Unknown date 1948
Ship	State	Description
Gyeongsan	Republic of Korea Navy	The Geumgagsan-class minesweeper grounded and was damaged beyond repair.
Samnethy	United Kingdom	The Liberty ship ran aground near the Owers Lightship off Selsey Bill, Sussex. Refloated on 22 February.

== March ==
=== 1 March ===
List of shipwrecks: 1 March 1948
Ship	State	Description
Harm Fritzen	United Kingdom	The cargo ship was scuttled in the Atlantic Ocean (47°55′N 8°58′W) with a cargo of obsolete chemical ammunition.

=== 8 March ===
List of shipwrecks: 8 March 1948
Ship	State	Description
USS Ralph Talbot	United States Navy	The decommissioned Bagley-class destroyer was sunk in the Pacific Ocean off Kwajalein after use as a test target in the 1946 Operation Crossroads atomic bomb tests.
USS Wilson	United States Navy	The decommissioned Benham-class destroyer was sunk in the Pacific Ocean off Kwajalein after use as a test target in the 1946 Operation Crossroads atomic bomb tests.

=== 9 March ===
List of shipwrecks: 9 March 1948
Ship	State	Description
Cowan	New Zealand	The wooden steam trawler sank after hitting rocks in Lyttelton Harbour, New Zealand.
USS SC-632	United States Navy	The hulk of the SC-497-class submarine chaser, which had foundered at Okinawa on 16 September 1945, was destroyed.

=== 10 March ===
List of shipwrecks: 10 March 1948
Ship	State	Description
USS Bracken	United States Navy	The decommissioned Gilliam-class attack transport was scuttled in the Pacific Ocean off Kwajalein after use as a test target in the 1946 Operation Crossroads atomic bomb tests.

=== 14 March ===
List of shipwrecks: 14 March 1948
Ship	State	Description
VP 61	French Navy	The VP 51-class motor launch was lost at Tahiti.
VP 62	French Navy	The VP 51-class motor launch was lost at Tahiti.
VP 63	French Navy	The VP 51-class motor launch was lost at Tahiti.

=== 16 March ===
List of shipwrecks: 16 March 1948
Ship	State	Description
USS LCI(L)-329	United States Navy	The decommissioned Landing Craft, Infantry was scuttled at Kwajalein, Marshall Islands after use as a target in the Operation Crossroads atomic bomb tests.

=== 22 March ===
List of shipwrecks: 22 March 1948
Ship	State	Description
USS Mugford	United States Navy	The decommissioned Bagley-class destroyer was sunk in the Pacific Ocean off Kwajalein after use as a test target in the 1946 Operation Crossroads atomic bomb tests.
USS Rhind	United States Navy	The decommissioned Benham-class destroyer was sunk in the Pacific Ocean off Kwajalein after use as a test target in the 1946 Operation Crossroads atomic bomb tests.

=== 25 March ===
List of shipwrecks: 25 March 1948
Ship	State	Description
Memphis	Greece	The cargo ship struck a mine and sank in the Mediterranean Sea at 33°50′N 27°34′E.

=== 28 March ===
List of shipwrecks: 28 March 1948
Ship	State	Description
Atlantic Ocean	Panama	The Liberty ship ran aground off Alexandria, Egypt. She was on a voyage from Iquique, Peru, to Alexandria. She was refloated on 1 April. Although declared a constructive total loss, she was repaired and returned to service.

=== 31 March ===
List of shipwrecks: 31 March 1948
Ship	State	Description
Estebeth	United States	The 70-gross register ton, 55.1-foot (16.8 m) motor passenger vessel was destroyed by fire in Southeast Alaska off Point Couverden (58°11′25″N 135°03′10″W), 55 nautical miles (102 km; 63 mi) from Juneau, Territory of Alaska.

== April ==
=== 3 April ===
List of shipwrecks: 3 April 1948
Ship	State	Description
Bernice	United States	The 14-gross register ton, 35.1-foot (10.7 m) fishing vessel was destroyed by fire in Carroll Inlet (55°17′N 131°30′W) near Ketchikan, Territory of Alaska.

=== 4 April ===
List of shipwrecks: 4 April 1948
Ship	State	Description
USS Mayrant	United States Navy	The decommissioned Benham-class destroyer was sunk in the Pacific Ocean off Kwajalein, Marshall Islands, after use as a target in the Operation Crossroads atomic bomb tests of 1946.

=== 8 April ===
List of shipwrecks: 8 April 1948
Ship	State	Description
Strong	Norway	The cargo ship sank off Egersund, Norway, with the loss of all nine crew.

=== 9 April ===
List of shipwrecks: 9 April 1948
Ship	State	Description
Cape Georgia	United States	The cargo ship struck a mine off La Pallice, Charente-Inférieure, France and was damaged.

=== 10 April ===
List of shipwrecks: 10 April 1948
Ship	State	Description
Bert Williams	United States	The Liberty ship was driven ashore in the Gulf of Suez. Later refloated and towed to Port Said, Egypt.

=== 11 April ===
List of shipwrecks: 11 April 1948
Ship	State	Description
HMAS Barcoo	Royal Australian Navy	The River-class frigate ran aground at Glenelg North, South Australia. She was undamaged and was later refloated.
Lino	Italy	The schooner was destroyed by an explosion at Bari whilst under arrest for carrying illegal arms bound for Syria.

=== 18 April ===
List of shipwrecks: 18 April 1948
Ship	State	Description
Bert Williams	United States	The Liberty ship was driven ashore in the Gulf of Suez 8 nautical miles (15 km) from the Al-Ashrafi Lighthouse. She was on a voyage from Fremantle, Western Australia to Suez, Egypt. She was refloated and towed in to Suez.
USS Mustin	United States Navy	The decommissioned Sims-class destroyer was sunk by gunfire in the Pacific Ocean off Kwajalein, Marshall Islands, after use as a target in the Operation Crossroads atomic bomb tests of 1946.

=== 19 April ===
List of shipwrecks: 19 April 1948
Ship	State	Description
USS Dawson	United States Navy	The decommissioned Gilliam-class attack transport was sunk in the Pacific Ocean off Kwajalein, Marshall Islands, by gunfire from the heavy cruiser USS Helena (United States Navy) after use as a target in the Operation Crossroads atomic bomb tests of 1946.
Duke of Sparta	United Kingdom	Bound for London from Liverpool the ship stranded on the Seven Stones Reef, between the Isles of Scilly and Cornwall. She was refloated on same day; the only ship to get off the reef in modern times.
USS LST-52	United States Navy	The decommissioned Landing Ship, Tank was sunk in the Pacific Ocean off Bikini Atoll, Marshall Islands, by gunfire after use as a target in the Operation Crossroads atomic bomb tests of 1946.
O'Boyle	United States Navy	The floating drydock sank off Cape Hatteras, North Carolina.

=== 23 April ===
List of shipwrecks: 23 April 1948
Ship	State	Description
Jalisco	United States	The 366-foot (112 m), concrete-hulled cargo ship ran aground in Yaquina Bay on 12 April. The vessel floated off with the tide and became stranded on Yaquina Bay North Reef, one-half-mile (0.80 km) offshore. She slid off the reef and sank on 23 April in 40 feet (12 m) of water.

=== 24 April ===
List of shipwrecks: 24 April 1948
Ship	State	Description
USS Stack	United States Navy	The decommissioned Benham-class destroyer was sunk by gunfire in the Pacific Ocean off Kwajalein, Marshall Islands, after use as a target in the Operation Crossroads atomic bomb tests of 1946.

=== Unknown date ===
List of shipwrecks: Unknown date April 1948
Ship	State	Description
Heyong	People's Liberation Army Navy	Chinese Civil War: The tank landing craft was sunk by Nationalist Chinese fighter-bomber aircraft. Three crew were killed.

== May ==
=== 6 May ===
List of shipwrecks: 6 May 1948
Ship	State	Description
USS Briscoe	United States Navy	The decommissioned Gilliam-class attack transport was sunk in the Pacific Ocean off Kwajalein, Marshall Islands, by gunfire from the light cruiser USS Duluth (United States Navy) after use as a target in the Operation Crossroads atomic bomb tests of 1946.
USS Catron	United States Navy	The decommissioned Gilliam-class attack transport was sunk in the Pacific Ocean off Kwajalein, Marshall Islands, by gunfire from the light cruiser USS Atlanta (United States Navy) after use as a target in the Operation Crossroads atomic bomb tests of 1946.

=== 8 May ===
List of shipwrecks: 8 May 1948
Ship	State	Description
Venture	United States	The 54-gross register ton 63-foot (19.2 m) wooden fishing vessel sank 10 nautical miles (19 km) northwest of Tugidak Island in the Trinity Islands of the Kodiak Archipelago, Territory of Alaska.

=== 11 May ===
List of shipwrecks: 11 May 1948
Ship	State	Description
USS Barrow	United States Navy	The decommissioned Gilliam-class attack transport was scuttled in the Pacific Ocean just south of Kwajalein, Marshall Islands, after use as a target in the Operation Crossroads atomic bomb tests of 1946.
USS LST-133	United States Navy	The decommissioned Landing Ship, Tank was sunk in the Pacific Ocean off Bikini Atoll, Marshall Islands, by gunfire after use as a target in the Operation Crossroads atomic bomb tests of 1946.

=== 12 May ===
List of shipwrecks: 12 May 1948
Ship	State	Description
USS Butte	United States Navy	The decommissioned Gilliam-class attack transport was scuttled in the Pacific Ocean off Kwajalein, Marshall Islands, after use as a target in the Operation Crossroads atomic bomb tests of 1946.
USS LST-220	United States Navy	The decommissioned Landing Ship, Tank was sunk in the Pacific Ocean off Bikini Atoll, Marshall Islands, by gunfire after use as a target in the Operation Crossroads atomic bomb tests of 1946.
USS LST-545	United States Navy	The decommissioned LST-542-class tank landing ship was sunk as a target at Enewetak Atoll in the Operation Sandstone atomic bomb tests.

=== 14 May ===
List of shipwrecks: 14 May 1948
Ship	State	Description
Lady Rae	United States	The 12-gross register ton, 32.4-foot (9.9 m) fishing vessel was destroyed by fire in Southeast Alaska at the southeastern end of Woronkofski Island in the Alexander Archipelago.
Rutland	Norway	The cargo ship ran aground west of Tjøme, Norway, whilst on a voyage from Bergen to Oslo.

=== 16 May ===
List of shipwrecks: 16 May 1948
Ship	State	Description
Polglen	United Kingdom	The coaster hit a mine and sank off Borkum, Netherlands. All fourteen crew were rescued by Glory (Netherlands).

=== 25 May ===
List of shipwrecks: 25 May 1948
Ship	State	Description
USS Salt Lake City	United States Navy	USS Salt Lake City sinking. The decommissioned Pensacola-class heavy cruiser was sunk as a target in the Pacific Ocean 130 miles (210 km) off the coast of Southern California after use as a target in the 1946 Operation Crossroads atomic bomb tests.

=== 31 May ===
List of shipwrecks: 31 May 1948
Ship	State	Description
Bobolink	United States	The 16-gross register ton, 37.5-foot (11.4 m) fishing vessel was destroyed by fire at Naknek, Territory of Alaska.

== June ==
=== 9 June ===
List of shipwrecks: 9 June 1948
Ship	State	Description
U-S-1	United States	The 91-gross register ton, 71.6-foot (21.8 m) scow sank at the anchorage at Naknek, Territory of Alaska.

=== 11 June ===
List of shipwrecks: 11 June 1948
Ship	State	Description
Kjøbenhavn	Denmark	The passenger ship struck a mine and sank 15 nautical miles (28 km) off the east coast of Jutland with the loss of 48 lives.

=== 16 June ===
List of shipwrecks: 16 June 1948
Ship	State	Description
Altalena	Israel	Altalena on fire at Tel Aviv Altalena Affair: The Irgun-operated converted tank landing ship was shelled by the Israel Defense Forces, grounded, and set on fire near Tel Aviv. She was towed out to sea and scuttled in 1949.

=== 24 June ===
List of shipwrecks: 24 June 1948
Ship	State	Description
Fenris	Norway	The tanker suffered a fire in her engine room whilst on a voyage from Puerto La Cruz, Venezuela to Le Havre, France. Declared a constructive total loss.

=== 25 June ===
List of shipwrecks: 25 June 1948
Ship	State	Description
Energetic	United Kingdom	The fishing boat collided with the Liberty ship Chrysanthystar and sank in the English Channel 10 nautical miles (19 km) off The Lizard, Cornwall with the loss of five of her six crew.

=== Unknown date ===
List of shipwrecks: Unknown date 1948
Ship	State	Description
Batavia Road	Australia	The tourist boat ran aground on Half Moon Reef, Western Australia.

== July ==
=== 2 July ===
List of shipwrecks: 2 July 1948
Ship	State	Description
USS Conyngham	United States Navy	The decommissioned Mahan-class destroyer was sunk as a target in the Pacific Ocean off California after use as target in the 1946 Operation Crossroads atomic bomb tests.
HMAS Vendetta	Royal Australian Navy	The V-class destroyer was scuttled in the Tasman Sea off Sydney, Australia.

=== 4 July ===
List of shipwrecks: 4 July 1948
Ship	State	Description
Kenudy	United States	The 11-gross register ton, 32.3-foot (9.8 m) fishing vessel sank in Clarence Strait in the Alexander Archipelago in Southeast Alaska 1.5 nautical miles (2.8 km) off Tolstoy Point (55°40′10″N 132°23′10″W).

=== 5 July ===
List of shipwrecks: 5 July 1948
Ship	State	Description
Thalatta	Norway	The cargo ship ran aground on the Siwadiwa Atoll in the Maldives. The vessel was refloated on 12 April 1949 and towed to Columbo, Ceylon, where she was declared a total loss.
Uranus	Norway	The cargo ship ran aground in Stokksundet, Norway, whilst on a voyage from Bergen to Tromsø.
USS Wainwright	United States Navy	The decommissioned Sims-class destroyer was sunk as a target in the Pacific Ocean off Bikini Atoll after use as target in the 1946 Operation Crossroads atomic bomb tests.

=== 8 July ===
List of shipwrecks: 8 July 1948
Ship	State	Description
Francois Tixier	France	capsized and sank off Sheringham, England.
USS New York	United States Navy	The decommissioned New York-class battleship was sunk as a target in the Pacific Ocean off Hawaii following use as a target in the 1946 Operation Crossroads atomic bomb tests.

=== 17 July ===
List of shipwrecks: 17 July 1948
Ship	State	Description
Amstelstroom	Netherlands	The coaster ran aground on Lundy Island, Devon, United Kingdom. All eleven crew scrambled ashore.

=== 18 July ===
List of shipwrecks: 18 July 1948
Ship	State	Description
Marie	Belgium	The cargo ship collided with Bharatkhand (United Kingdom) 8 nautical miles (15 km) north east of Ushant and sank.
Marlene	United Kingdom	The cargo ship struck a submerged object at Falmouth, Cornwall and was holed. She was beached in Great Molunan Cove to prevent her sinking.

=== 20 July ===
List of shipwrecks: 20 July 1948
Ship	State	Description
Cronenburgh	Netherlands	Ran aground between Stockholm and Mäntyluoto, Finland. The vessel was refloated but still leaking. The ship was repaired and returned to service.

=== 21 July ===
List of shipwrecks: 21 July 1948
Ship	State	Description
USS Gasconade	United States Navy	Gasconade sinking. The Gilliam-class attack transport was sunk as a torpedo target in the Pacific Ocean off California after use as a target in the Operation Crossroads atomic bomb tests of 1946.

=== 24 July ===
List of shipwrecks: 24 July 1948
Ship	State	Description
Kiska	United States	The 48-gross register ton, 59.6-foot (18.2 m) fishing vessel sank after colliding with the motor vessel Mayflower (United States) at the entrance to South Kaigani Harbor (54°45′30″N 132°43′00″W) on the south coast of Dall Island in the Alexander Archipelago in Southeast Alaska.

=== 25 July ===
List of shipwrecks: 25 July 1948
Ship	State	Description
USS LST-661	United States Navy	The LST-542-class tank landing ship was sunk in the Pacific Ocean off Enewetak Atoll after use as a target in the Operation Sandstone atomic bomb tests.

=== 27 July ===
List of shipwrecks: 27 July 1948
Ship	State	Description
Philip Heineken	Germany	The cargo ship was scuttled in the Skagerrak with a cargo of poison gas munitions.

=== 28 July ===
List of shipwrecks: 28 July 1948
Ship	State	Description
A S P No. 3	United States	The 40-gross register ton scow was wrecked on Salamatof Beach (60°37′15″N 151°20′30″W) on the south-central coast of the Territory of Alaska north of Kenai.
River Swift	United Kingdom	The cargo ship caught fire at Buenos Aires, Argentina. She was declared uneconomical to repair and was scrapped in 1949.

=== 29 July ===
List of shipwrecks: 29 July 1948
Ship	State	Description
TID 147	United Kingdom	The TID-class tug foundered in the Hainan Strait during a typhoon. She was on a voyage from Singapore to Hong Kong.

=== 31 July ===
List of shipwrecks: 31 July 1948
Ship	State	Description
USS Nevada	United States Navy	The decommissioned Nevada-class battleship was sunk as a target approximately 60 miles (97 km) southwest of Pearl Harbor, Hawaii, after use as a target in the 1946 Operation Crossroads atomic bomb tests.
Penstone	United Kingdom	The coaster was in collision with Villanger (Norway) in Liverpool Bay and sank with the loss of four of the six people on board.

=== Unknown date ===
List of shipwrecks: Unknown date in July 1948
Ship	State	Description
Bert Williams	Italy	The Liberty ship broke in two whilst under tow from Port Said, Egypt to an Italian port. The vessel's bow section was salvaged and subsequently joined to the stern section of Nathaniel Bacon (United States).

== August ==
=== 1 August ===
List of shipwrecks: 1 August 1948
Ship	State	Description
Chippewa	United States	The 11-gross register ton, 32.3-foot (9.8 m) fishing vessel was wrecked in Harris Cove (56°19′30″N 134°17′00″W) on the coast of Kuiu Island in the Alexander Archipelago in Southeast Alaska.

=== 3 August ===
List of shipwrecks: 3 August 1948
Ship	State	Description
Kenai I	United States	The 163-gross register ton, 82.3-foot (25.1 m) motor cargo vessel was destroyed by fire at the mouth of the Kasilof River in Cook Inlet on the south-central coast of the Territory of Alaska.
Maristella	Italy	The cargo ship struck a mine and was damaged off Borkum, Allied-occupied Germany. She was consequently sold for scrapping in May 1950.

=== 4 August ===
List of shipwrecks: 4 August 1948
Ship	State	Description
Marian M	United States	The 34-gross register ton, 49.2-foot (15.0 m) fishing vessel was lost in Salisbury Sound in the Alexander Archipelago in Southeast Alaska 60 nautical miles (110 km; 69 mi) west of Sitka, Territory of Alaska, after she collided with an inactive naval mine.

=== 11 August ===
List of shipwrecks: 11 August 1948
Ship	State	Description
USS Skipjack	United States Navy	The decommissioned Salmon-class submarine was sunk as a target by aircraft rockets off California after use as a target in the 1946 Operation Crossroads atomic bomb tests.

=== 17 August ===
List of shipwrecks: 17 August 1948
Ship	State	Description
Dell	United States	The 8-gross register ton, 36-foot (11.0 m) fishing vessel was destroyed by fire in Lynn Canal opposite the Chilkat River in Southeast Alaska near Haines, Territory of Alaska.

=== 19 August ===
List of shipwrecks: 19 August 1948
Ship	State	Description
Arleux	Canada	The fishing vessel Arleux foundered off White Head Bay, Nova Scotia.

=== 22 August ===
List of shipwrecks: 22 August 1948
Ship	State	Description
Empire Success	United Kingdom	The cargo ship was scuttled in the Bay of Biscay (47°16′30″N 30°09′24″W) with a cargo of obsolete chemical ammunition.

=== 24 August ===
List of shipwrecks: 24 August 1948
Ship	State	Description
Corena	(flag) United Kingdom	The 140.4-foot (42.8 m), 352-ton trawler ran aground in fog and was wrecked 6 miles (9.7 km) north of Frederickshaab, Greenland. Later salvaged and scrapped.

=== 25 August ===
List of shipwrecks: 25 August 1948
Ship	State	Description
Asia	United Kingdom	The passenger ship collided with the Liberty ship Ciclope in the English Channel 15 nautical miles (28 km) off St. Catherine's Point, Isle of Wight and was severely damaged. She was on a voyage from London to Montreal, Quebec, Canada. She put in to Southampton, Hampshire.
Monte Nuria	Spain	The cargo ship was holed in the North Sea. She was beached at Sheringham, Norfolk, United Kingdom.
Moonlight	United Kingdom	The barge capsized and sank off Ardlamont Point, Argyllshire with the loss of four of the five people on board.

=== 29 August ===
List of shipwrecks: 29 August 1948
Ship	State	Description
Hellenic Bulbul	United Kingdom	The coaster ran aground on Domanik Island, Bay of Bengal, India and sank.
Willard B	United States	The 64-gross register ton, 73.3-foot (22.3 m) fishing vessel was wrecked in Lisianski Strait 2 nautical miles (3.7 km; 2.3 mi) north of Pelican City, Territory of Alaska.

=== 30 August ===
List of shipwrecks: 30 August 1948
Ship	State	Description
Prowess	Norway	The ex-Portuguese-class naval trawler ran aground in Frøyskjæret, west of Florø whilst on a voyage from Poland to Vadsø, Norway. Refloated in 1951 and scrapped in 1954.
HMS Worcester	Royal Navy	The training ship sank in the Thames Estuary at Grays, Essex.

=== Unknown date ===
List of shipwrecks: Unknown date 1948
Ship	State	Description
Myra	United States	The 10-gross register ton, 39.6-foot (12.1 m) motor cargo vessel was destroyed by fire in the harbor at Whittier, Territory of Alaska.

== September ==
=== 5 September ===
List of shipwrecks: 5 September 1948
Ship	State	Description
Goose	United States	The 12-gross register ton, 32.9-foot (10.0 m) fishing vessel was wrecked on the coast of the Territory of Alaska 23 nautical miles (43 km) west of Cape Spencer.

=== 6 September ===
List of shipwrecks: 6 September 1948
Ship	State	Description
Caledonia	United States	The 164-gross register ton, 82.2-foot (25.1 m) fishing vessel sank in a storm off a location identified in the wreck report as "Icy Point" in Southeast Alaska. It is not clear to which of at least two locations of the name the wreck report refers.

=== 11 September ===
List of shipwrecks: 11 September 1948
Ship	State	Description
USS Mahackemo	United States Navy	The tug sank in the Atlantic Ocean off Cape Hatteras, North Carolina whilst under tow.
USS Searaven	United States Navy	The decommissioned Sargo-class submarine was sunk as a target after use as a target in the 1946 Operation Crossroads atomic bomb tests.

=== 13 September ===
List of shipwrecks: 13 September 1948
Ship	State	Description
Imp	United States	The 7-gross register ton, 29.4-foot (9.0 m) fishing vessel sank 0.5 nautical miles (0.93 km) south of False Point Retreat (58°22′10″N 134°58′15″W) in Southeast Alaska.

=== 16 September ===
List of shipwrecks: 16 September 1948
Ship	State	Description
Leicester	United Kingdom	The Liberty ship was abandoned in the North Atlantic with the loss of six of her 45 crew. Survivors were rescued by the Victory ship Tropero (Argentina) and Cecil Bean (United States). Leicester was located on 26 September by Foundation Lillian (Canada) and towed to Bermuda By Foundation Josephine (Canada), arriving 3 October. Beached by a hurricane on 7 October, re-floated 19 October, and towed to Newport News, Virginia, United States, arriving 31 October. Repaired and recommissioned 14 December.
USS YOG-83	United States Navy	The 375 foot 5,410 ton YOG-40 class oil barge was beached in the Pacific Ocean at Kwajalein Atoll, Marshall Islands after use as a target in the Operation Crossroads atomic bomb tests of 1946 in September, 1946. She was refloated and scuttled.

=== 19 September ===
List of shipwrecks: 19 September 1948
Ship	State	Description
Lochmonar	United Kingdom	The cargo ship ran aground during a hurricane at Little Cayman, Cayman Islands. She was refloated on 30 September.

=== 20 September ===
List of shipwrecks: 20 September 1948
Ship	State	Description
Dubrovnik	United States	The 31-gross register ton, 49-foot (14.9 m) fishing vessel was destroyed by fire at Klawock, Territory of Alaska.

=== 21 September ===
List of shipwrecks: 21 September 1948
Ship	State	Description
B F No. 9	United States	The 46-ton, 60-foot (18.3 m) wooden scow was wrecked between Crooked Island (57.7764°N 152.3906°W) and Near Island opposite Kodiak, Territory of Alaska.

=== 24 September ===
List of shipwrecks: 24 September 1948
Ship	State	Description
USS Tuna	United States Navy	The decommissioned Tambor-class submarine was sunk in the Pacific Ocean off Mare Island, California, after use as a target in the 1946 Operation Crossroads atomic bomb tests.

=== 27 September ===
List of shipwrecks: 27 September 1948
Ship	State	Description
Mui Lee	Norway	The cargo ship was driven ashore at Hoihow, China in a typhoon. Refloated in 1949 and sold.

=== 28 September ===
List of shipwrecks: 28 September 1948
Ship	State	Description
Maria Joana	Portugal	The cargo ship was wrecked at the entrance to Fogo Harbour, Newfoundland.

== October ==
=== 2 October ===
List of shipwrecks: 2 October 1948
Ship	State	Description
Borgøy	Norway	The cargo ship sprang a leak and sank off Lista, Norway, whilst on a voyage from Ålesund to Stockholm, Sweden.

=== 5 October ===
List of shipwrecks: 5 October 1948
Ship	State	Description
USS Skate	United States Navy	The decommissioned Balao-class submarine was sunk as a target in the Pacific Ocean off California after serving as a target for the 1946 Operation Crossroads atomic bomb tests.

=== 6 October ===
List of shipwrecks: 6 October 1948
Ship	State	Description
HDMS Alken	Royal Danish Navy	The patrol boat was lost off Greenland with the loss of all eight crew.
Nora	United States	The 62-gross register ton, 68-foot (20.7 m) motor cargo vessel sank in the Gulf of Alaska off Middleton Island off the south-central coast of the Territory of Alaska.
Takoradian	United Kingdom	The cargo ship caught fire and sank at Copenhagen, Denmark.

=== 15 October ===
List of shipwrecks: 15 October 1948
Ship	State	Description
Skarstone	United States	The 261-gross register ton, 98.6-foot (30.1 m) fishing vessel was wrecked on Yakataga Beach (60°03′40″N 142°26′00″W) 40 nautical miles (74 km) west of Yakutat, Territory of Alaska.
Star of Peace	United Kingdom	The 115.7-foot (35.3 m), 210-ton trawler sprung a leak 40 miles (64 km) off St. Anne's Head. Isker took her crew off and put her under tow, but she sank.

=== 16 October ===
List of shipwrecks: 16 October 1948
Ship	State	Description
USS Hughes	United States Navy	The decommissioned Sims-class destroyer was sunk as a target in the Pacific Ocean off Kwajalein, Marshall Islands, after being used as a target in the 1946 Operation Crossroads atomic bomb tests.

=== 17 October ===
List of shipwrecks: 17 October 1948
Ship	State	Description
P T & B Co. 1652	United States	The 1,008-gross register ton, 202.4-foot (61.7 m) barge sank in the Bering Sea approximately 20 nautical miles (37 km) north of Seguam Island in the Andreanof Islands group of the Aleutian Islands.

=== 22 October ===
List of shipwrecks: 22 October 1948
Ship	State	Description
El Amir Farouq	Royal Egyptian Navy	1948 Arab-Israeli War, Operation Yoav: The El Amir Farouq-class sloop-of-war was sunk off the Gaza Strip by Israeli Navy MT explosive motorboats.

=== 25 October ===
List of shipwrecks: 25 October 1948
Ship	State	Description
Henny	Norway	The cargo ship ran aground west of Rongevær, Norway, whilst on a voyage from Brevik to Namsos. Refloated on 2 April 1949, repaired and returned to service.
Toby T	United States	The 9-gross register ton, 29.9-foot (9.1 m) fishing vessel was destroyed by fire in Orca Inlet 3 nautical miles (5.6 km) from Cordova, Territory of Alaska.

=== 26 October ===
List of shipwrecks: 26 October 1948
Ship	State	Description
Empire Flamingo	United Kingdom	The bow section of the Design 1022 ship sank in the English Channel 3 nautical miles (5.6 km) south of the Longships Lighthouse, Cornwall whilst under tow. It was raised in 1949 and sunk off Gwennap Head, Cornwall. Raised in 1949 and sunk off Gwennap Head, Cornwall.
Wenche	Norway	The cargo ship sank 100 nautical miles (190 km) south west of Kopervik, Norway, whilst on a voyage from Newcastle upon Tyne to Kopervik.

=== 30 October ===
List of shipwrecks: 31 October 1948
Ship	State	Description
Unnamed luzzu	Malta	1948 Gozo luzzu disaster: The fishing boat which was overloaded with passengers capsized and sank in the Gozo Channel off Qala, Gozo, Malta, killing 23 of the 27 people on board.

=== 31 October ===
List of shipwrecks: 31 October 1948
Ship	State	Description
Tendringen	Norway	The cargo ship ran aground and sank in the Namsenfjord, Norway, whilst on a voyage from Slemmestad to Namsos.

== November ==
=== 1 November ===
List of shipwrecks: 1 November 1948
Ship	State	Description
St Guenole	France	The tanker ran aground at Gribba Head, Cornwall, United Kingdom with the loss of eleven of her twelve crew.

=== 2 November ===
List of shipwrecks: 2 November 1948
Ship	State	Description
Flandres	Belgium	The Victory ship was driven ashore at Recife, Brazil. Although declared a constructive total loss, she was sold, repaired and returned to service.

=== 4 November ===
List of shipwrecks: 4 November 1948
Ship	State	Description
Esso Wheeling	United States	The T2 tanker ran aground at Quoin Point, Union of South Africa. She was on a voyage from Santos, Brazil to Abadan, Iran. She broke in two the next day and was a total loss.

=== 5 November ===
List of shipwrecks: 5 November 1948
Ship	State	Description
D. T. Sheridan	United States	While towing barges in dense fog, the 110-foot (34 m) tug was wrecked on rocks at Lobster Point, Monhegan Island, Maine, at 43°45′21″N 069°19′24″W. Her crew survived.

=== 8 November ===
List of shipwrecks: 8 November 1948
Ship	State	Description
Arr 738	United States	The 2,297-gross register ton barge was wrecked near Taylor Island (58°18′N 136°30′W) in Southeast Alaska.

=== 10 November ===
List of shipwrecks: 10 November 1948
Ship	State	Description
USS Pensacola	United States Navy	USS Pensacola sinking. The decommissioned Pensacola-class heavy cruiser was sunk as a target in the Pacific Ocean off Washington after use as a target in the 1946 Operation Crossroads atomic bomb tests.

=== 11 November ===
List of shipwrecks: 11 November 1948
Ship	State	Description
Grom	Norway	The cargo ship sprang a leak and sank 8 nautical miles (15 km) south west of Kvistøy, Norway, whilst on a voyage from Rekefjord to Møre.

=== 13 November ===
List of shipwrecks: 13 November 1948
Ship	State	Description
Rene	Belgium	The cargo ship ran aground on the Rocks of Mansonria off Fedala, French Morocco. Declared a constructive total loss.

=== 14 November ===
List of shipwrecks: 14 November 1948
Ship	State	Description
Hopestar	United Kingdom	The cargo ship foundered in the Atlantic Ocean off Newfoundland with the loss of all 40 crew.
USS YOGN-84	United States Navy	The YOG-40 class fuel oil barge sank at sea in a typhoon off Saipan.

=== 17 November ===
List of shipwrecks: 17 November 1948
Ship	State	Description
EK-3	Soviet Navy	The Tacoma-class frigate ran aground off Petropavlosk, Soviet Union. She was declared a total loss.
USS U-1105	United States Navy	The Type VIIC/41 submarine was deliberately sunk in the Atlantic Ocean off the Point No Point Lighthouse, Maryland. She was raised in mid 1949.

=== 22 November ===
List of shipwrecks: 22 November 1948
Ship	State	Description
Southern Flyer	United Kingdom	The 438 GRT whaler ran aground on rocks at Lazarete Beach, Cape Verde after calling in for bunkers while on delivery voyage to South Georgia.

=== 23 November ===
List of shipwrecks: 23 November 1948
Ship	State	Description
Famous	United States	The 41-gross register ton, 57.5-foot (17.5 m) motor cargo vessel was wrecked in the Territory of Alaska at an unidentified location described by the wreck report as "Point Alba."
HNoMS Hauk	Royal Norwegian Navy	The motor torpedo boat was destroyed by fire.

=== 30 November ===
List of shipwrecks: 30 November 1948
Ship	State	Description
Alexandrouplis	Unknown	The merchant ship sank.

== December ==
=== 1 December ===
List of shipwrecks: 1 December 1948
Ship	State	Description
Juni	Iceland	The 140.3-foot (42.8 m), 328-ton trawler was wrecked at Saudanes, between Sugandafjordur and Onundarfjordur, northwestern Iceland, due to faulty echo sounder. All hands rescued.

=== 4 December ===
List of shipwrecks: 4 December 1948
Ship	State	Description
Kiangya	China	The wreck of Kiangya. The passenger steamship exploded and sank at the mouth of the Huangpu River in China with the loss of at least 2,750 lives.

=== 15 December ===
List of shipwrecks: 15 December 1948
Ship	State	Description
Eiholm	Norway	The cargo ship sank off Kragerø, Norway, whilst on a voyage from Brevik to Etnesjøen.

=== 18 December ===
List of shipwrecks: 18 December 1948
Ship	State	Description
EK-3	Soviet Navy	The EK-1-class escort was wrecked in a storm at Korsakov, Sakhalin Island. Later refloated and used as a depot/accommodations ship.

=== 20 December ===
List of shipwrecks: 20 December 1948
Ship	State	Description
Bosphorus	Norway	The cargo ship ran aground on Haisborough Sand, Norfolk, United Kingdom. Refloated on 29 December.

=== 24 December ===
List of shipwrecks: 24 December 1948
Ship	State	Description
Alcyone Fortune	United Kingdom	The cargo ship ran aground at the Mull of Kintyre, Argyllshire. Refloated on 30 December.

=== 25 December ===
List of shipwrecks: 25 December 1948
Ship	State	Description
Capitan	Flag unknown	The T1 tanker broke in two off Cape Hatteras, North Carolina, United States. She was being towed from Savannah, Georgia to Baltimore, Maryland. The bow section remained under tow of the tug Tern (United States) and was taken in to Baltimore. The stern section was towed in to Baltimore on 6 January 1949. Subsequently repaired and sold to the Argentine Navy, entering service as ARA Punta Loyola.

=== 28 December ===
List of shipwrecks: 28 December 1948
Ship	State	Description
Farne	Norway	The ex-Isles-class trawler sank off Halland, Sweden with the loss of all fourteen crew. She was on a voyage from Stettin, Poland to Larvik, Norway.

=== 30 December ===
List of shipwrecks: 30 December 1948
Ship	State	Description
Rojo	Norway	The cargo ship sank in the North Sea whilst on a voyage from Middlesbrough, Yorkshire to Denmark.

=== Unknown date ===
List of shipwrecks: Unknown date December 1948
Ship	State	Description
Arthur Newell Talbot	United States	The 366-foot (112 m), concrete-hulled cargo ship was scuttled as a breakwater in Chesapeake Bay at Kiptopeke, Virginia sometime in December.
Commiles	United Kingdom	The trawler, a former Castle class naval trawler, went ashore in a blizzard at Kyle of Loch Alsh sometime in December. Two crew rescued by breaches bouy, the rest by HMS Flamborogh Head (Royal Navy). Refloated, repaired and returned in December.
Edwin Thacher	United States	The 366-foot (112 m), concrete-hulled cargo ship was scuttled as a breakwater in Chesapeake Bay at Kiptopeke, Virginia sometime in December.
Goth	United Kingdom	The 147.5-foot (45.0 m), 394.48-ton trawler last communicated with other trawlers whilst making for shelter at Adalvik, Iceland in severe weather on 13 December. Lost with all 21 hands. Her funnel came up in nets on 15 November 1997. Presumed lost at 66°59′N 24°28′W 43 miles (69 km) northwest of Straumnes.
John Grant	United States	The 366-foot (112 m), concrete-hulled cargo ship was scuttled as a breakwater in Chesapeake Bay at Kiptopeke, Virginia sometime in December.
Leonard Chase Wason	United States	The 366-foot (112 m), concrete-hulled cargo ship was scuttled as a breakwater in Chesapeake Bay at Kiptopeke, Virginia sometime in December.
Richard Kidder Meade	United States	The 366-foot (112 m), concrete-hulled cargo ship was scuttled as a breakwater in Chesapeake Bay at Kiptopeke, Virginia sometime in December.
Robert Whitman Lesley	United States	The 366-foot (112 m), concrete-hulled cargo ship was scuttled as a breakwater in Chesapeake Bay at Kiptopeke, Virginia sometime in 1948.
William Foster Cowham	United States	The 366-foot (112 m), concrete-hulled cargo ship was scuttled as a breakwater in Chesapeake Bay at Kiptopeke, Virginia sometime in December.

== Unknown date ==
List of shipwrecks: Unknown date 1948
Ship	State	Description
Akdamar	Soviet Union	The ship foundered in Lake Van, Turkey.
Alice L. Pendleton	United States	The 228-foot (69 m), 1,349-gross register ton four-masted lumber schooner was abandoned at the Palmer Shipyard on the west side of the Mystic River in Noank, Connecticut, sometime during the 1940s, gradually rotted away, and settled on the river bottom in 10 feet (3.0 m) of water.
HNLMS G-16	Royal Netherlands Navy	The G-13-class torpedo boat was sunk was a target off Den Helder sometime in 1948.
ROKS Ka Won	Republic of Korea Navy	The YMS-1-class coastal minesweeper was lost.
Koolama	Australia	The war-damaged ship was scuttled off Wyndham, Western Australia.
Schleswig-Holstein	Kriegsmarine	The captured pre-dreadnought battleship was beached by the Soviet Navy in the Gulf of Finland near Osmussaar Island in the Soviet Union's Estonian Soviet Socialist Republic for use as a target. The hulk was used as a target until 1966, eventually becoming entirely submerged
Take	Imperial Japanese Navy	The decommissioned training ship, a former destroyer, was scuttled as a breakwater at the Port of Akita, Honshu, Japan.

== See also ==
- Lists of shipwrecks
