= Darra =

Darra may refer to:

== Places ==
- Darra, Queensland, a suburb of Brisbane, Australia
- Darra, Swabi, a village in Swabi District, Pakistan
- Darra Adam Khel, a town in Kohat District, Pakistan
- Darra Pezu, a town in Lakki Marwat District, Pakistan

== Other uses ==
- Darra (film), a 2016 Indian Punjabi-language film
- Darra Goldstein (born 1951), American professor
- Darra (clipper), a tea-clipper, part of the ships' graveyard on Quail Island, New Zealand

== See also ==
- Battle of Ain Darra, fought at Ain Dara, Lebanon
- Darra Khaibar, a Pakistani film
- Dara (disambiguation)
