= Torrington =

Torrington may refer to:

== People ==
- Arthur Torrington, Guyanese-born co-founder of the Windrush Foundation and the Equiano Society
- Jeff Torrington, Scottish writer
- John Torrington, English explorer and Royal Navy stoker
- George Byng, 1st Viscount Torrington, British naval officer and statesman

== Places ==
=== Australia ===
- Torrington, New South Wales
- Torrington, Queensland

=== Canada ===
- Torrington, Alberta

=== United Kingdom ===
- Black Torrington, a village in Devon
- East Torrington, a small village in Lincolnshire
- Great Torrington, a market town in north Devon
- Little Torrington, a village in Devon
- West Torrington, a small village in Lincolnshire
- Torrington (UK Parliament constituency), in Devon

=== United States ===
- Torrington, Connecticut
- Torrington, Wyoming

== Other uses ==
- Battle of Torrington, fought in 1646 during the English Civil War
- Earl of Torrington, a title in the British peerage
- Viscount Torrington, a title in the British peerage
- HMS Torrington, the name of four ships of the Royal Navy
- SS Torrington, British collier built in 1905, sunk by German submarine in April 1917
- Torrington (1847 brig), a sailing brig built in 1847 in Nova Scotia, which sank in New Zealand in 1851
- Torrington F.C., football club in Great Torrington, Devon
- Torrington railway station, Devon
- Torrington Company, Antifriction Bearing Company

== See also ==
- Thorington
- Thorrington
