= Laukvik =

Laukvik or Laukvika may refer to:

== Places ==
- Laukvik, Agder, a village in Risør Municipality in Agder county, Norway
- Laukvik, Finnmark, a village in Alta Municipality in Finnmark county, Norway
- Laukvik, Nordland, a village in Vågan municipality in Nordland county, Norway
- Laukvik, Tjeldsund, a village in Tjeldsund Municipality in Nordland county, Norway
- Laukvik, Troms, a village in Senja Municipality in Troms county, Norway
