= Strandlandet Church =

- Strandlandet kirke
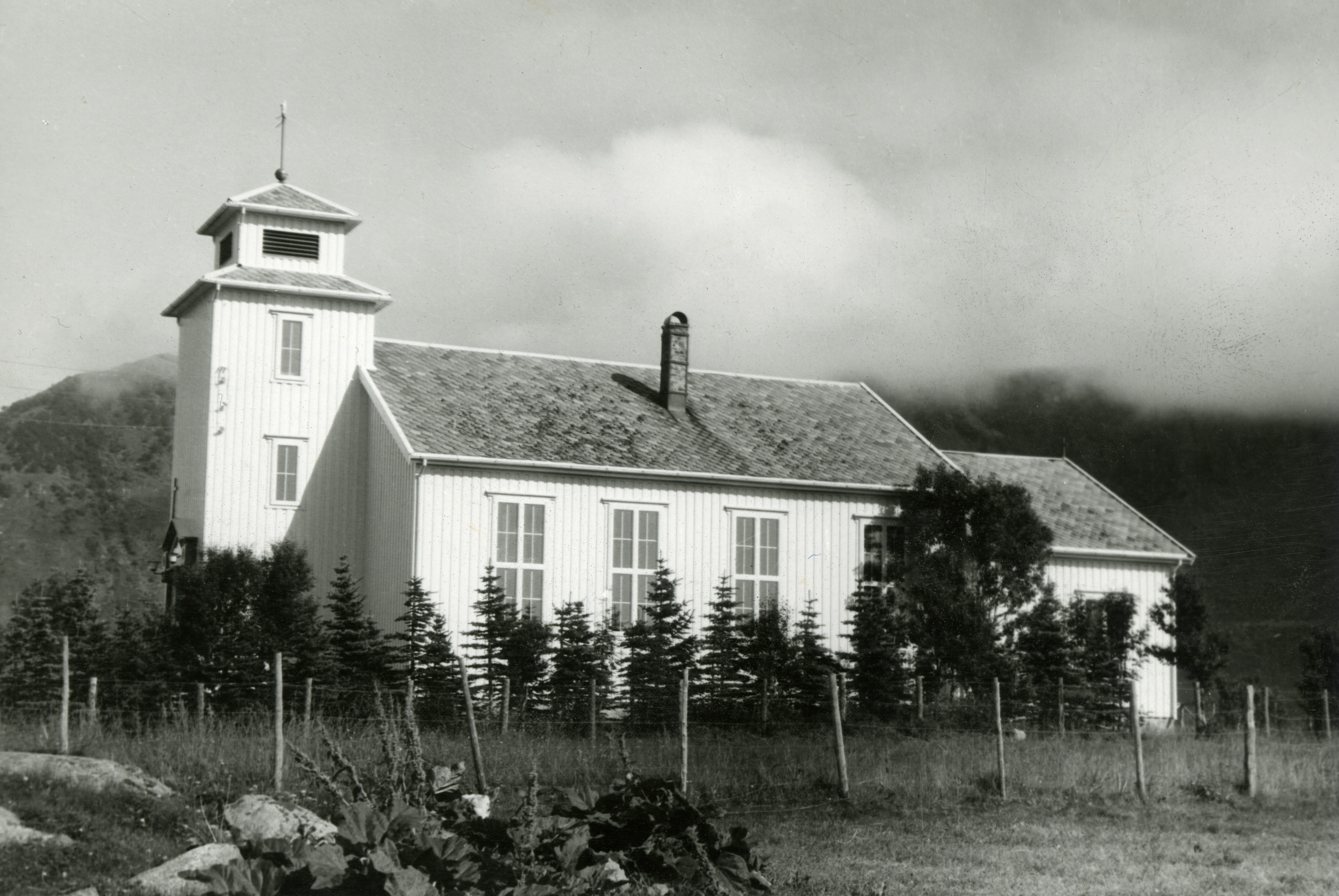
- View of the church
- Strandlandet Church
- 68.39293373°N 14.4687983°E
- Location: Vågan, Nordland
- Country: Norway
- Denomination: Church of Norway
- Churchmanship: Evangelical Lutheran

History
- Status: Parish church
- Founded: 1938
- Consecrated: 1938

Architecture
- Functional status: Active
- Architect: Sverre Pettersen
- Architectural type: Long church
- Completed: 1938 (88 years ago)

Specifications
- Capacity: 250
- Materials: Wood

Administration
- Diocese: Sør-Hålogaland
- Deanery: Lofoten prosti
- Parish: Strandlandet
- Norwegian Cultural Heritage Site
- Type: Church
- Status: Not protected
- ID: 85599

Strandlandet Church (Norwegian: Strandlandet kirke) is a parish church of the Church of Norway in Vågan Municipality in Nordland county, Norway. It is located in the village of Straumnes on the northwestern part of the island of Austvågøya. It is the church for the Strandlandet parish which is part of the Lofoten prosti (deanery) in the Diocese of Sør-Hålogaland. The white, wooden church was built in a long church style in 1938 using plans drawn up by the architect Sverre Pettersen. The church seats about 250 people and originally it was built to serve the eastern part of the old Gimsøy Municipality.

== See also ==
- List of churches in Sør-Hålogaland
