= ST Oriana =

History
- Name: Empire Frieda (1945–47); Oriana (1947–48)
- Owner: Ministry of War Transport (1945–46); Ministry of Transport (1946–47); Admiralty (1947–48)
- Operator: Overseas Towage and Salvage Co. Ltd.
- Port of registry: Glasgow, United Kingdom
- Builder: Ferguson Brothers (Port Glasgow) Ltd., Port Glasgow
- Yard number: 377
- Launched: 22 October 1945
- Completed: 31 January 1946
- Out of service: 19 January 1948
- Identification: United Kingdom Official Number 169463; Code Letters GFDP
- Fate: Struck mine and sank

General characteristics
- Class & type: Tug
- Tonnage: 295 GRT, 262 NRT
- Length: 116 ft 9 in (35.59 m)
- Beam: 27 ft 6 in (8.38 m)
- Draught: 13 ft 6 in (4.11 m)
- Depth: 12 ft 7 in (3.84 m)
- Installed power: Triple expansion steam engine, 900 ihp
- Propulsion: Single screw propeller
- Crew: 15

Oriana was a 295 GRT tug which was built in 1945 as Empire Frieda by Ferguson Brothers (Port Glasgow) Ltd., Port Glasgow, Renfrewshire, United Kingdom for the Ministry of War Transport (MoWT). Ownership was transferred to the Ministry of Transport in 1946 and the Admiralty in 1947, when she was renamed Oriana. She struck a mine and sank in the River Colne, Essex on 19 January 1948 with the loss of all on deck.

== Description ==
The ship was 116 ft 0 in (35.36 m) long, with a beam of 27 feet 6 inches (8.38 m). She had a depth of 12 feet 7 inches (3.84 m) and a draught of 13 feet 6 inches (4.11 m). She was assessed at 295 GRT, 262 NRT.

The ship was propelled by a 900 ihp triple expansion steam engine, which had cylinders of 14, 25 1/2 and 41 inches (36, 65 and 104 cm) diameter by 27 inches (69 cm) stroke. The engine was built by Ferguson Brother (Port Glasgow) Ltd. It drove a single screw propeller.

== History ==
Empire Freetown was built in 1945 as yard number 377 by Ferguson Brothers (Port Glasgow) Co. Ltd., Port Glasgow, Renfrewshire for the Ministry of War Transport (MoWT). She was launched on 22 October 1945 and completed on 31 January 1946. Her port of registry was Glasgow. The United Kingdom Official Number 169463 and Code Letters GFDP were allocated. She was operated under the management of the Overseas Towageand Salvage Co. Ltd, London.

The MoWT became the Ministry of Transport in April 1946. She was passed to the Admiralty on 31 May 1947 and renamed Oriana. On 19 January 1948, with the French tug Vagrant, she was towing HMMS 366 from Chatham Dockyard to Brightlingsea, Essex when she struck a mine and sank in the Colne Estuary with the loss of all fifteen of her crew, who all hailed from the Medway Towns, Kent.

== See also ==
- Ministry of War Transport
- British Admiralty
- List of shipwrecks in 1948
