= Kiptopeke, Virginia =

Unincorporated community in Virginia, US

Coordinates: 37°08′17″N 75°58′00″W

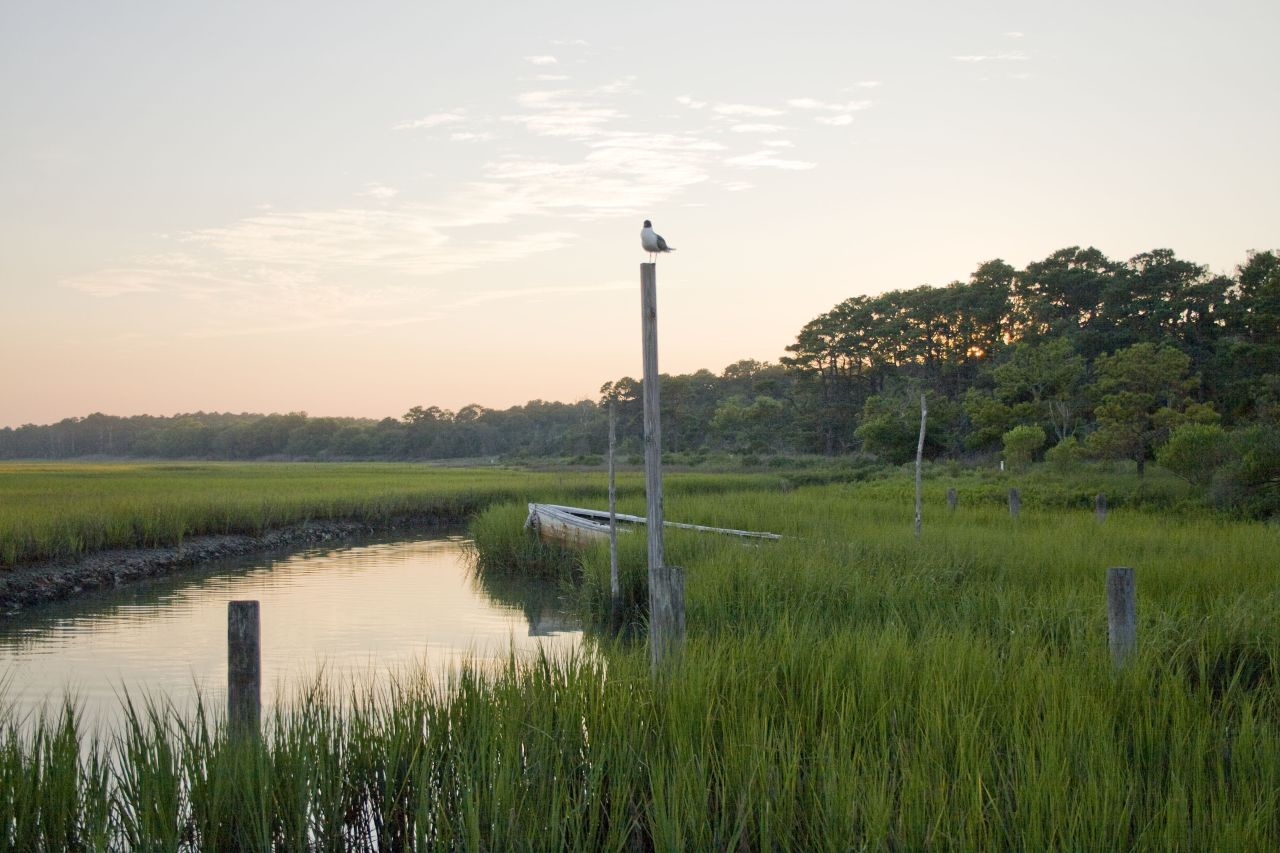
Landscape near Kiptopeke

Kiptopeke is an unincorporated community in Northampton County, Virginia, United States.

Kiptopeke became the replacement northern terminus of the Little Creek-Cape Charles Ferry when US 13 was relocated through the community in 1954.

Cape Charles Light was listed on the National Register of Historic Places in 2003.

== See also ==
- Kiptopeke State Park
