= MV Mamutu =

History
- Name: Mamutu
- Owner: Burns Philp & Company
- Builder: Hong Kong
- Completed: 1938
- Fate: Sunk on 7 August 1942

General characteristics
- Type: Cargo ship
- Tonnage: 300 GRT
- Length: 113 ft (34 m)
- Beam: 25 ft (7.6 m)

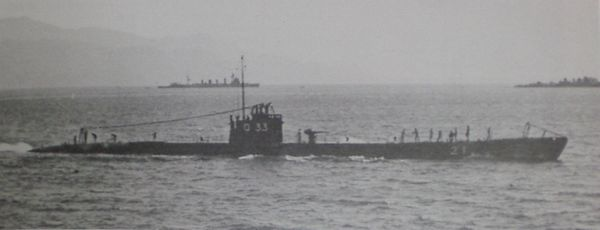
Ro-33 on 8 April 1939.

(lThe motor vessel MV Mamutu was an Australian merchant ship built in Hong Kong in 1938. She was of 300 gross tons, 113 feet (34.4 m) in length, and had a beam of 25 feet (7.6 m). She operated on an inter-island trade route for Burns Philp & Company, and at the outbreak of World War II, she was engaged in the evacuation of civilians ahead of advancing Japanese forces in New Guinea. The Mamutu sunk in August 1942 after being attacked by a Japanese submarine Ro-33 in the Gulf of Papua near Murray Island.

== History ==
With the onset of war, Mamutu served as a Royal Australian Navy stores ship during 1941, returning to customary resupply duty in January 1942. On 7 August 1942, she was sunk by enemy action in the Gulf of Papua near Murray Island, Torres Strait, with the loss of 114 lives. Twenty-seven persons were thought to have survived by drifting to the coast on air-delivered life rafts, while one person was taken back to Port Moresby by a Royal Australian Air Force rescue plane. The attack location, given by British Admiralty records, was 09°11′S 144°12′E.

The following account of Mamutu's loss is drawn from the book Battle Surface- Japan's Submarine War Against Australia 1942-1944 by David Jenkins, published by Random House Australia in 1992:

The submarine trailing Mamutu was a RO-33 class submarine under the command of Lieutenant Commander Shigeshi Kuriyama. R.O.33 [sic] had a surface speed of 19 knots (35 km/h; 22 mph) and was closing fast, as she drew near, Kuriyama ordered his crew to man the 3.25-inch gun [sic; Ro-33 had a 3-inch (76.2 mm) gun] mounted forward of the conning tower. At 300 metres [330 yards], he gave the order to fire. The first shell ripped into the radio room, killing Furbank; the second shot carried away the bridge, killing Captain J. McEachern. Other shells tore into the hull. Within minutes, Mamutu was a scene of carnage with dead and dying littering the decks. Kuriyama then ordered his gunners to open fire with 13mm gunfire as survivors struggled in the water; men, women and children. He then retired, leaving Mamutu a sinking hull and most of her complement dead.

There were only 28 survivors from the total complement of 120 persons. One man, a mixed-race engineer named William "Billy" Griffin, escaped death at the hands of the machine gunners by pretending to be dead. Billy helped the 12 men crew of the RAA "Calypso" rescuers whose plane crashed during the rescue mission, killing one member. Billy helped the surviving crew to reach land and eventually their safe return to Port Moresby. His heroic efforts were recognised by the RAA in a commemoration service on April 30 2022 with names of the crew and Billy engraved on a memorial walk in North Head, Manly.

A United States Army Air Forces B-17 Flying Fortress search aircraft dropped life rafts to the struggling survivors, who eventually made it to shore. The Australian Army signal ship MV Reliance, which was used by the Coastwatchers, was sent from Murray Island to try to pick up the survivors but was unable to locate them.

== Postscript ==
On 29 August 1942, Ro-33 torpedoed the Burns Philp ship Malaita (3,310 tons gross) as she left Port Moresby, New Guinea. Malaita under escort by the Australian destroyer HMAS Arunta under the command of Commander J.C. Morrow. While Malaita was towed back to Port Moresby, Arunta made an asdic contact on Ro-33 and conducted a series of depth-charge attacks that sank the Japanese submarine 10 nautical miles (19 km; 12 mi) southeast of Port Moresby at 09°36′S 147°06′E with the loss of all hands.
