= Laukvik, Nordland =

Fishing village in Vågan Municipality, Norway

Laukvika Laukvik
- Village
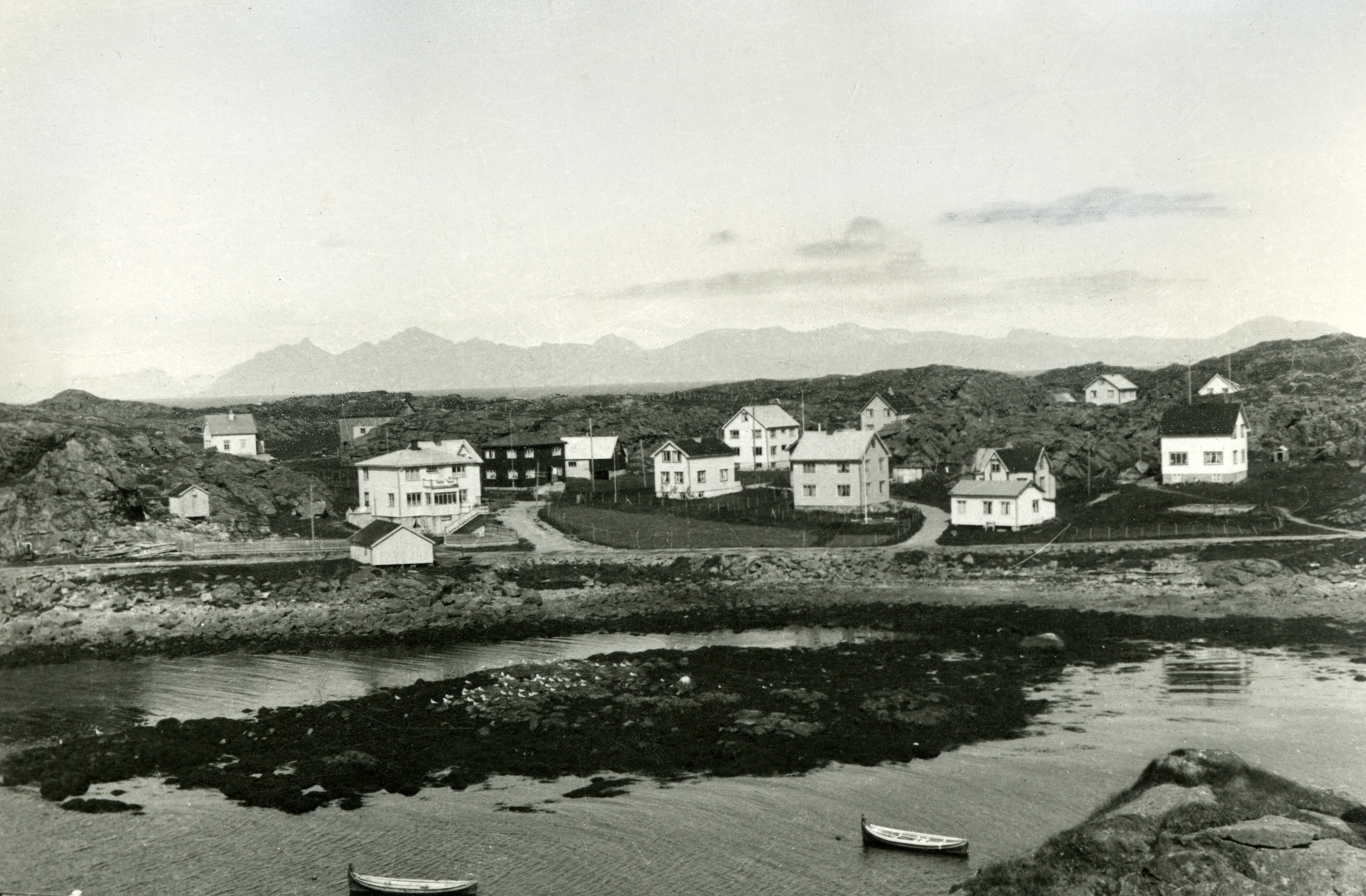
- Old photo of the village
- Interactive map of Laukvika
- Location within Nordland Location within Norway
- Coordinates: 68.3881°N 14.4177°E
- Country: Norway
- Region: Northern Norway
- County: Nordland
- District: Lofoten
- Municipality: Vågan Municipality
- Elevation: 5 m (16 ft)
- Time zone: UTC+01:00 (CET)
  - Summer (DST): UTC+02:00 (CEST)
- Post Code: 8315 Laukvik

Laukvika is a village in Vågan Municipality in Nordland county, Norway. The fishing village is located along the Norwegian Sea on the northwestern shore of the island of Austvågøya, just west of the village of Straumnes. Together, Laukvik and Straumnes have about 350 residents.
