= Torrington (1847 brig) =

Torrington was a brig built in 1847. It sank in New Zealand in 1851.

== Construction and Registration ==
Torrington was built in Nova Scotia in 1847. It weighed 128 tons.

The brig was Registered No. 80 of 1849, Port of Sydney, New South Wales.

== Voyages ==
The owner of the vessel was a Mr J Peacock, who was also the master. Torrington was first reported trading in New Zealand in 1849.

By 1850, Torrington was operating in New Zealand, trading general goods and visiting the ports of Lyttelton (formerly called Port Cooper), Nelson, Akaroa, and Wellington.

In February 1851, Mr Peacock was convicted by the Magistrates Court in Wellington of using the vessel to smuggle goods, including 7-8 tons of flour, gunpowder and tobacco. Mr Peacock was fined $100 and forfeited the goods.

== Wreck ==
On 27 June 1851, a very severe gale blew through Lyttelton Harbour, where Torrington was in port. The vessel was reduced to a wreck. William and John was also wrecked in the gale.

Cargo was salvaged from the wreck, which was auctioned in July 1851. The wreck remained on the sea floor and visible; six months after it sank the Harbour Master referred to its wreck as a landmark in the harbour for ships discharging ballast. A one-quarter share in the hull of Torrington (with corresponding salvage rights) was auctioned on 5 March 1852.
