= Japanese submarine Ro-33 =

Submarine of 1935–1942

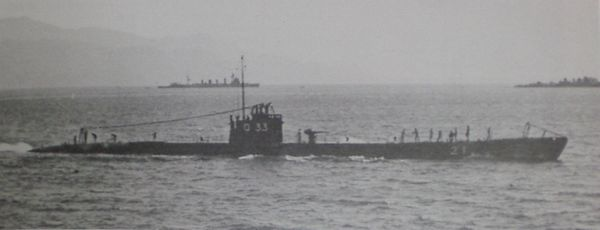
- Ro-33 on 8 April 1939.

History

Japan
- Name: Original name unknown
- Builder: Kure Naval Arsenal, Kure, Japan
- Laid down: 8 August 1933
- Launched: 10 October 1934
- Renamed: Ro-33 on 10 October 1934
- Completed: 7 October 1935
- Commissioned: 7 October 1935
- Decommissioned: 15 November 1939
- Recommissioned: 1 May 1940
- Decommissioned: 15 May 1941
- Recommissioned: ca. mid-November 1941
- Fate: Sunk 29 August 1942
- Stricken: 5 October 1942

General characteristics
- Class & type: Kaichū type submarine (K6 subclass)
- Displacement: 955 tonnes (940 long tons) surfaced; 1,219 tonnes (1,200 long tons) submerged
- Length: 73 m (239 ft 6 in) overall
- Beam: 6.7 m (22 ft 0 in)
- Draft: 3.25 m (10 ft 8 in)
- Installed power: 3,000 bhp (2,200 kW) (diesel); 1,200 hp (890 kW) (electric motor)
- Propulsion: Diesel-electric; 1 × diesel engine; 1 × electric motor
- Speed: 19 knots (35 km/h; 22 mph) surfaced; 8.25 knots (15.28 km/h; 9.49 mph) submerged
- Range: 8,000 nmi (15,000 km; 9,200 mi) at 12 knots (22 km/h; 14 mph) surfaced; 90 nmi (170 km; 100 mi) at 3.5 knots (6.5 km/h; 4.0 mph) submerged
- Test depth: 75 m (246 ft)
- Crew: 75
- Armament: 4 × bow 533 mm (21 in) torpedo tubes; 1 × 76.2 mm (3.00 in) L/40 anti-aircraft gun; 1 × 13.2 mm (0.52 in) Type 93 anti-aircraft machinegun

Ro-33 was an Imperial Japanese Navy Ro-33-class submarine. Completed and commissioned in November 1935, she served during World War II in the South China Sea, Indian Ocean, and southwestern Pacific Ocean and operated in support of Japanese forces in the invasion of British Malaya, the invasion of Java, the Battle of the Coral Sea, the Guadalcanal campaign, and the New Guinea campaign. She was sunk in August 1942 during her fifth war patrol.

== Design and description ==
The submarines of the K5 sub-class were versions of the preceding KT sub-class with greater surface speed. They displaced 955 tonnes (940 long tons) surfaced and 1,219 tonnes (1,200 long tons) submerged. The submarines were 73 meters (239 ft 6 in) long, had a beam of 6.7 meters (22 ft 0 in) and a draft of 3.25 meters (10 ft 8 in). They had a diving depth of 75 meters (246 ft).

For surface running, the boats were powered by two 1,450-brake-horsepower (1,081 kW) diesel engines, each driving one propeller shaft. When submerged each propeller was driven by a 600-horsepower (447 kW) electric motor. They could reach 19 knots (35 km/h; 22 mph) on the surface and 8.25 knots (15.28 km/h; 9.49 mph) underwater. On the surface, the K5s had a range of 8,000 nautical miles (15,000 km; 9,200 mi) at 12 knots (22 km/h; 14 mph); submerged, they had a range of 90 nmi (170 km; 100 mi) at 3.5 knots (6.5 km/h; 4.0 mph).

The boats were armed with four internal bow 53.3 cm (21.0 in) torpedo tubes and carried a total of ten torpedoes. They were also armed with a single 76.2 mm (3.00 in) L/40 anti-aircraft gun and one 13.2 mm (0.52 in) Type 93 anti-aircraft machinegun.

== Construction and commissioning ==
Ro-33 was laid down on 8 August 1933 by the Kure Naval Arsenal at Kure, Japan, as the lead submarine of the Ro-33 class. She was launched on 10 October 1934 and was named Ro-33 that day. She was completed and commissioned on 7 October 1935.

== Service history ==
=== Pre-World War II ===
Upon commissioning, Ro-33 was attached to the Maizuru Naval District. On 31 May 1937 she was reassigned to Submarine Division 21 in the Sasebo Naval District. On 9 April 1938 she got underway from Sasebo, Japan, for a training cruise in southern Chinese waters that concluded with her arrival at Kīrun, Formosa, on 14 April 1938. Submarine Division 21 was reassigned to the Combined Fleet on 15 December 1938 and to Submarine Squadron 2 in the 2nd Fleet on 8 April 1939. Ro-33 was placed in the Second Reserve in the Sasebo Naval District on 15 November 1939.

Ro-33 returned to active service on 1 May 1940, with Submarine Division 21 reassigned to Submarine Squadron 5 in the 4th Fleet. She departed Sasebo on 16 May 1940 for a lengthy training cruise in the Caroline Islands, Marshall Islands, and Mariana Islands which concluded with her arrival at Yokosuka, Japan, on 22 September 1940. She participated in a naval review at Yokohama, Japan, on 11 October 1940. Submarine Division 21 was reassigned to Submarine Squadron 4 on 15 November 1940.

Ro-33 and her sister ship Ro-34 were placed in Third Reserve at Sasebo, Japan, on 15 May 1941, and while in reserve Ro-33 relieved Ro-34 as flagship of Submarine Division 21 on 21 May 1941. From mid-October through early November 1941 she underwent repairs and a refit at Maizuru Naval Arsenal in Maizuru, Japan. After the work was complete, she returned to active service, probably in mid-November 1941.

=== World War II ===
The Pacific Campaign of World War II began on 7 December 1941 (8 December 1941 in East Asia) with the Japanese attack on Pearl Harbor, Hawaii. At 16:00 on 8 December 1941, Submarine Division 21 — Ro-33 and Ro-34 — departed Sasebo bound for Cam Rahn Bay in Japanese-occupied French Indochina, which Ro-33 reached on 14 December 1941.

==== First war patrol ====
On 21 December 1941, Ro-33 got underway from Cam Ranh Bay to begin her first war patrol, assigned an operating area in the South China Sea east of Singapore in support of the Japanese invasion of British Malaya. Her patrol was uneventful, and she departed her patrol area on 5 January 1942 to return to Cam Ranh Bay, where she arrived on 7 January 1942.

==== Second war patrol ====
On 13 January 1942, Ro-33 departed Cam Ranh Bay for her second war patrol, bound for a patrol area in the South China Sea southeast of Anambas and west of Java. After another quiet patrol, she returned to Cam Ranh Bay on 30 January 1942.

==== Third war patrol ====
Ro-33 began her third war patrol on 8 February 1942, putting to sea from Cam Ranh Bay and again ordered to patrol off Anambas, in the same area as the submarine I-53. Attached to the A Unit along with Ro-34 on 9 February 1942, she arrived in her patrol area on 10 February 1942.

On 13 February 1942, Ro-33 moved to a new patrol area in the Indian Ocean to support the upcoming Japanese invasion of Java, operating south of the Sunda Strait, Java — including off Tjilatjap — the Lombok Strait, and Bali. At around 22:00 on 1 March 1942 she attacked an Allied destroyer south-southeast of Christmas Island, but her torpedoes missed when the destroyer apparently made an evasive maneuver at the last minute. Ro-33′s target probably was the United States Navy destroyer USS Whipple (DD-217), which reported sighting a submarine at around the same time while she was engaged in rescuing survivors of the fleet oiler USS Pecos (AO-6), which Japanese aircraft had sunk at 14°27′S 106°11′E. Ro-33 concluded her patrol on 8 March 1942 with her arrival at Staring Bay on the coast of Celebes in the Netherlands East Indies.

==== March–April 1942 ====
On 10 March 1942, Submarine Squadron 4 was disbanded, and Submarine Division 21 — Ro-33 and Ro-34 — was reassigned to Submarine Squadron 6 in the 4th Fleet. The two submarines departed Staring Bay on 22 March 1942, called at Palau from 26 to 30 March 1942, and then headed for Truk, which they reached on 3 April 1942. On 4 April 1942, Submarine Division 21 was reassigned to the South Seas Force. Submarine Squadron 4 was disbanded on 10 April 1942, and that day Submarine Division 21 was reassigned to Submarine Squadron 7 in the 4th Fleet. The two submarines departed Truk on 15 April 1942, and on 18 April 1942 they arrived at Rabaul on New Britain.

==== Third war patrol ====
Ro-33 departed Rabaul on 20 April 1942 to begin her third war patrol, with orders to conduct a reconnaissance of Port Moresby on the southeast coast of New Guinea. She returned to Rabaul on 23 April 1942.

==== Operation Mo ====
On 1 May 1942, Ro-33 and Ro-34 departed Rabaul bound for Port Moresby to support Operation Mo, a planned Japanese invasion of Tulagi in the Solomon Islands and Port Moresby. While they were en route, the Battle of the Coral Sea began on 4 May 1942 as Allied forces moved to block the Japanese offensive. As the battle continued, the two submarines arrived off Port Moresby on 5 May 1942. The Japanese seized Tulagi and were turned back from Port Moresby, and Ro-33 departed her patrol area on 10 May 1942 to return to Rabaul.

==== May–July 1942 ====
Ro-33 and Ro-34 later moved to Truk, and on 23 May 1942 they departed Truk bound for Sasebo, where they arrived on 30 May 1944. Ro-33 underwent repairs and an overhaul at Sasebo, and after the work was completed, she and Ro-34 left Sasebo on 9 July 1942, called at Truk from 17 to 23 July 1942, and proceeded to Rabaul, arriving there on 27 July 1942.

==== Fourth war patrol ====
On 29 July 1942, Ro-33 began her fourth war patrol, putting to sea from Rabaul to head for a patrol area in the Coral Sea in the vicinity of Port Moresby and off the southeast coast of New Guinea. At 10:34 on 7 August 1942, she was in the Gulf of Papua northeast of Murray Island and 30 nautical miles (56 km; 35 mi) west of Bramble Bay when she sighted the Australian 300-gross register ton motor vessel MV Mamutu, which was on a voyage from Port Moresby to Daru, New Guinea, carrying 143 people — 103 passengers and a crew of 40 — and general cargo. She surfaced, and Mamutu fled, with Ro-33 in pursuit and firing at Mamutu with her 76.2-millimeter (3 in) deck gun. Ro-33′s first shot destroyed Mamutu′s radio room, and her second shot hit Mamutu′s bridge, killing her captain. By 11:00, Mamutu had been reduced to a blazing wreck, and she went dead in the water at 09°11′S 144°12′E and began to sink. As Ro-33 passed Mamutu, her commanding officer, Lieutenant Commander Shigeyuki Kuriyama, ordered his gunners to open fire on the survivors struggling in the water — which included men, women, and children — with Ro-33′s machine gun. In all, 114 passengers and crew died in the sinking of Mamutu and Ro-33′s subsequent attack on the people in the water, and there were only 28 survivors.

On the day Ro-33 sank Mamutu, the Guadalcanal campaign began with U.S. amphibious landings on Guadalcanal, Tulagi, Florida Island, Gavutu, and Tanambogo in the southeastern Solomon Islands. That day, the 8th Fleet ordered Ro-33, Ro-34, and the submarines I-121, I-122, and I-123 to proceed to Indispensable Strait off Guadalcanal, conduct a reconnaissance of the anchorage at Lungga Roads off Lungga Point on the northern coast of Guadalcanal, and contact Japanese forces on the island.

Ro-33 arrived off Lungga Point on 11 August 1942. At 12:00 on 12 August, she arrived off Cape Hunter on Guadalcanal′s southwestern coast and made contact with Japanese forces ashore who informed her crew that a U.S. task force consisting of two aircraft carriers, two battleships, five cruisers and several transports had been seen leaving Guadalcanal, information that Ro-33 reported to 8th Fleet headquarters. She provided food to Japanese forces at Cape Esperance on the northwestern coast of Guadalcanal on 13 August 1942, and on 15 August reconnoitered Savo Island, reporting that the Allies had established an observation post on the island′s northwest coast. She returned to Rabaul on 16 August 1942.

==== Fifth war patrol ====
Ro-33 put to sea from Rabaul on 22 August 1942 to begin her fifth war patrol, assigned a patrol area off Port Moresby in support of Japanese forces fighting in the New Guinea campaign. By 25 August she was off southeastern New Guinea south of Samarai, and she transmitted a routine status report on 26 August 1942 announcing her arrival in her patrol area. The Japanese never heard from her again.

==== Loss ====
To avoid attack by Japanese aircraft, the 3,310-gross register ton merchant ship Malaita departed Port Moresby at 11:34 on 29 August 1942 bound for Cairns, Australia, under escort by the Royal Australian Navy destroyer HMAS Arunta. Malaita was in the Gulf of Papua west of Port Moresby when Ro-33 hit her with a torpedo at 09°50′S 144°55′E. The torpedo struck Malaita under her bridge on her starboard side, and she took on such a heavy list to starboard that her crew abandoned ship at 12:45, fearing she would capsize. Malaita′s crew eventually returned to her, and she was towed back to Port Moresby.

Meanwhile, Arunta gained sonar contact on Ro-33 10 nautical miles (19 km; 12 mi) southeast of Port Moresby. Arunta made four depth-charge attacks beginning at 13:05, and after the fourth attack her crew observed a large oil slick on the surface, marking the sinking of Ro-33 with the loss of all hands at 09°36′S 147°06′E.

On 1 September 1942, the Imperial Japanese Navy declared Ro-33 to be presumed lost off Port Moresby with her entire crew of 70. The Japanese struck her from the Navy list on 5 October 1942.
