= Straumnes =

Village in Vågan Municipality, Norway

- Village
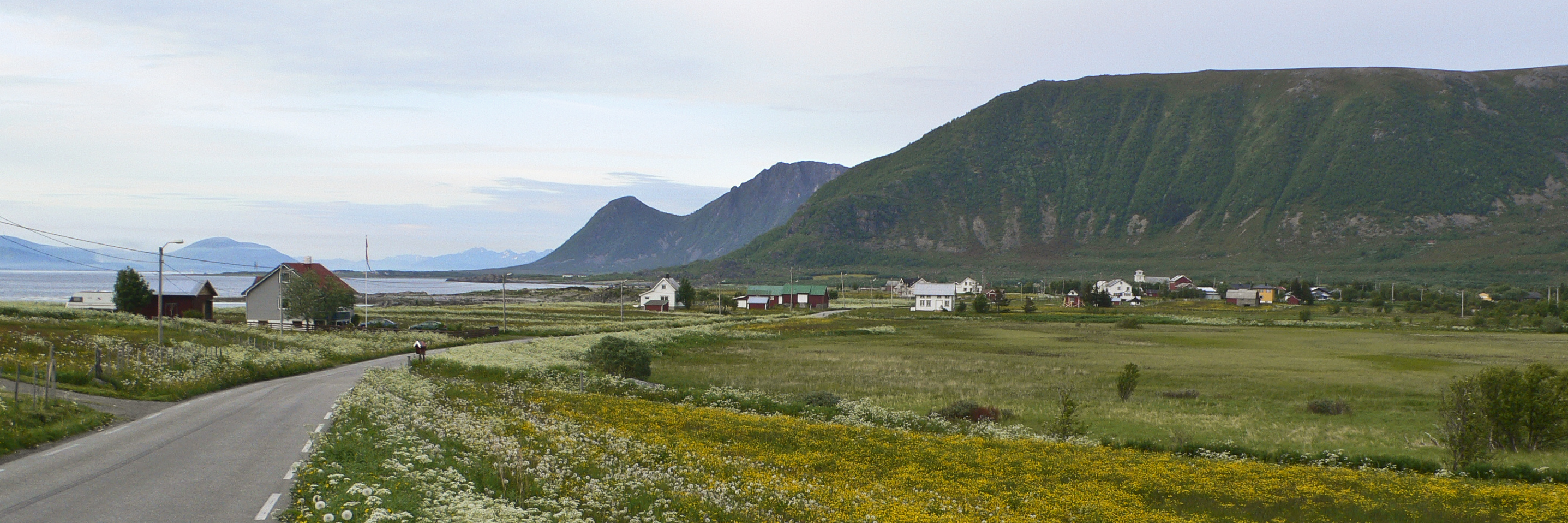
- View of the Straumnes area
- Interactive map of Straumnes
- Location within Nordland Location within Norway
- Coordinates: 68.3932°N 14.4663°E
- Country: Norway
- Region: Northern Norway
- County: Nordland
- District: Lofoten
- Municipality: Vågan Municipality
- Elevation: 5 m (16 ft)
- Time zone: UTC+01:00 (CET)
  - Summer (DST): UTC+02:00 (CEST)
- Post Code: 8315 Laukvik

Straumnes is a village in Vågan Municipality in Nordland county, Norway. It is located just east of the village of Laukvika along the Vesterålsfjorden (a part of the Norwegian Sea) on the northwestern side of the island of Austvågøya in the Lofoten archipelago. Strandlandet Church is located in this village.
