= William and John =

William and John was a New Zealand cutter of 10 tons.

== Voyages and notable incidents ==
William and John is first recorded in New Zealand shipping reports in port at Lyttelton Harbour in March 1851.

On 8 April 1851, William and John was anchored in Lyttelton Harbour when a gale caused the vessel to drag its anchor into shallow water. It was hauled up and laid on the beach at high tide by onlookers, escaping the further damage which would have been caused if the cutter settled on the harbour floor at low tide.

The vessel was trading around Banks Peninsula one month later, delivering goods to settlers around the Peninsula. On 18 May 1851, William and John was recorded in Pigeon Bay, where the master, Daniel Morrison, fell from a rock and was knocked unconscious. He died at Lyttelton hospital on the evening of the following day. In the coroners inquest, it was found that Mr Morrison had been drinking, and fought with a worker at the sawmill before he fell from a rock on the shore.

== Wreck ==
On 27 June 1851, a severe gale blew through Lyttelton Harbour. William and John is described as being dashed to pieces in the storm.
