= USS LST-545 =

Navy LTS-542-class tank landing ship

History

United States
- Name: USS LST-545
- Builder: Missouri Valley Bridge and Iron Company, Evansville, Indiana
- Laid down: 13 December 1943
- Launched: 12 February 1944
- Sponsored by: Mrs. Charles M. Wright
- Commissioned: 23 March 1944
- Decommissioned: 29 August 1946
- Stricken: 28 May 1948
- Fate: Sunk as target 12 May 1948

General characteristics
- Class & type: LST-542-class tank landing ship
- Displacement: 1,490 long tons (1,514 t) light; 4,080 long tons (4,145 t) full
- Length: 328 ft (100 m)
- Beam: 50 ft (15 m)
- Draft: 8 ft (2.4 m) forward; 14 ft 4 in (4.37 m) aft (full)
- Propulsion: 2 × General Motors 12-567 diesel engines, two shafts, twin rudders
- Speed: 10.8 knots (20.0 km/h; 12.4 mph)
- Complement: 7 officers, 204 enlisted men
- Armament: 6 × 40 mm guns; 6 × 20 mm guns

USS LST-545 was a United States Navy LST-542-class tank landing ship in commission from 1944 to 1946

== Construction and commissioning ==
LST-545 was laid down on 13 December 1943 at Evansville, Indiana, by the Missouri Valley Bridge and Iron Company. She was launched on 12 February 1944, sponsored by Mrs. Charles M. Wright, and commissioned on 23 March 1944.

== Service history ==
LST-545 saw no combat action during World War II. Following the war, she performed occupation duty in the Far East until early December 1945. She then returned to the United States.

== Decommissioning and disposal ==
LST-545 was decommissioned on 29 August 1946. She was sunk as a target on 12 May 1948 at Enewetak Atoll in the Operation Sandstone atomic bomb test series, by either the Yoke or Zebra detonations or the two of them in combination. She was stricken from the Navy List on 28 May 1948.
