= Darra (clipper) =

Darra was a barque-rigged clipper, built at Aberdeen and launched in 1865.

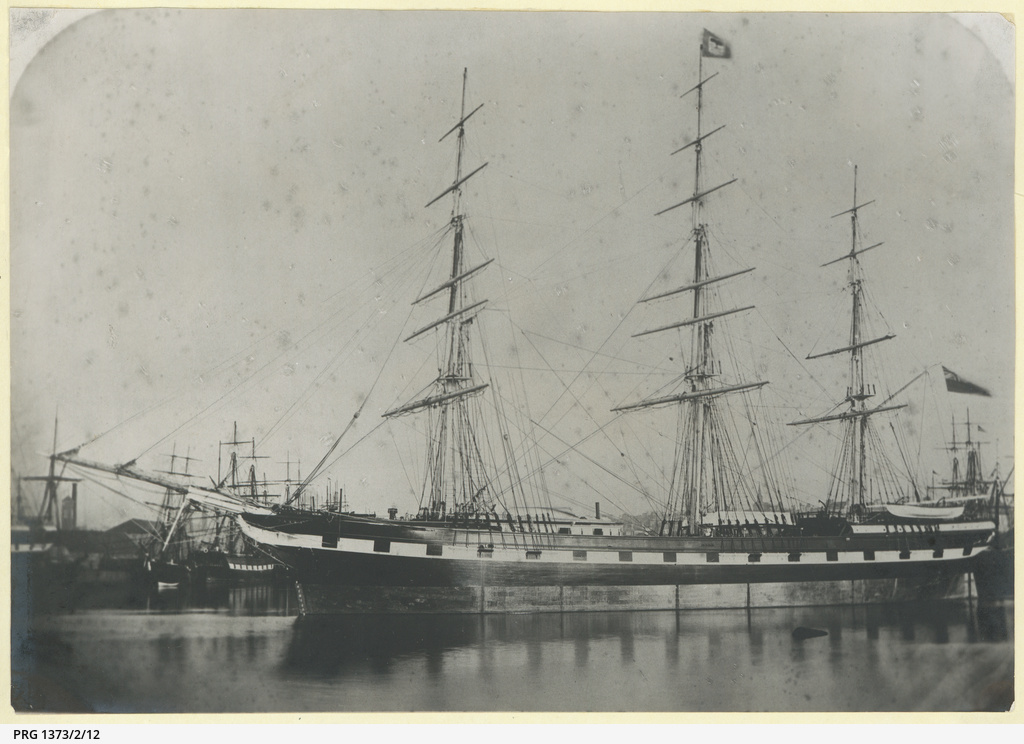
Darra, circa 1875, flying the flag of the Orient Line

== Construction ==
Darra's hull was of a composite construction, wooden planking on a wrought iron frame. It was built by Hall and Company, Aberdeen. Its displacement was 999 tons, length 190 feet, beam 33 feet, and draft 21 feet.

== Voyages and notable incidents ==
=== Early voyages ===
Darra was built for the Orient Line. Its maiden voyage was between Aberdeen and India in 1866.

Darra seems to have made only one voyage to India. As early as October 1866, one year after being launched, Darra was reported in London loading passengers for Australia. This was the first of many voyages between London and Adelaide, with passengers being taken to Australia, and goods from the colony being carried on the return voyage to London.

In 1887, Darra broke the record for a passage between London and Adelaide, completing the voyage in 70 days.

=== 'The Darra Outrage' ===
On 26 November 1887, Darra, returning to London carrying a cargo of coal from Newcastle, Australia, put in to port in San Diego. The captain hired three seamen from the dock informally, to help trim ballast before sailing. That night, approximately 20 men from the Coast Seamen's Union boarded the vessel and forcibly removed the hired seamen, objecting to their having been hired. The boarders found the hired men, and carried them back to shore in their boats despite the captain having confronted the boarders with a revolver. The San Diego Union newspaper reported on the incident on 28 November, under the headline 'It Smacks of Piracy'.

=== New Zealand ===
In 1899, Darra was extensively damaged by fire while in Sydney Harbour. The remains of the vessel were purchased by the Westport Coal Company for use in New Zealand. Darra was towed to Dunedin where it was refitted, before being towed to Lyttelton. The dismasted hull was used as a coal hulk for the next fifty years, serving steam vessels in the Port of Lyttelton.

== Beaching ==
In December 1950, Darra was temporarily rigged and painted to resemble the Charlotte Jane, as part of the Christchurch centenary celebrations. As soon as the celebrations were over, the rigging and fittings were dismantled, the hull was cut down and the vessel sold as scrap.

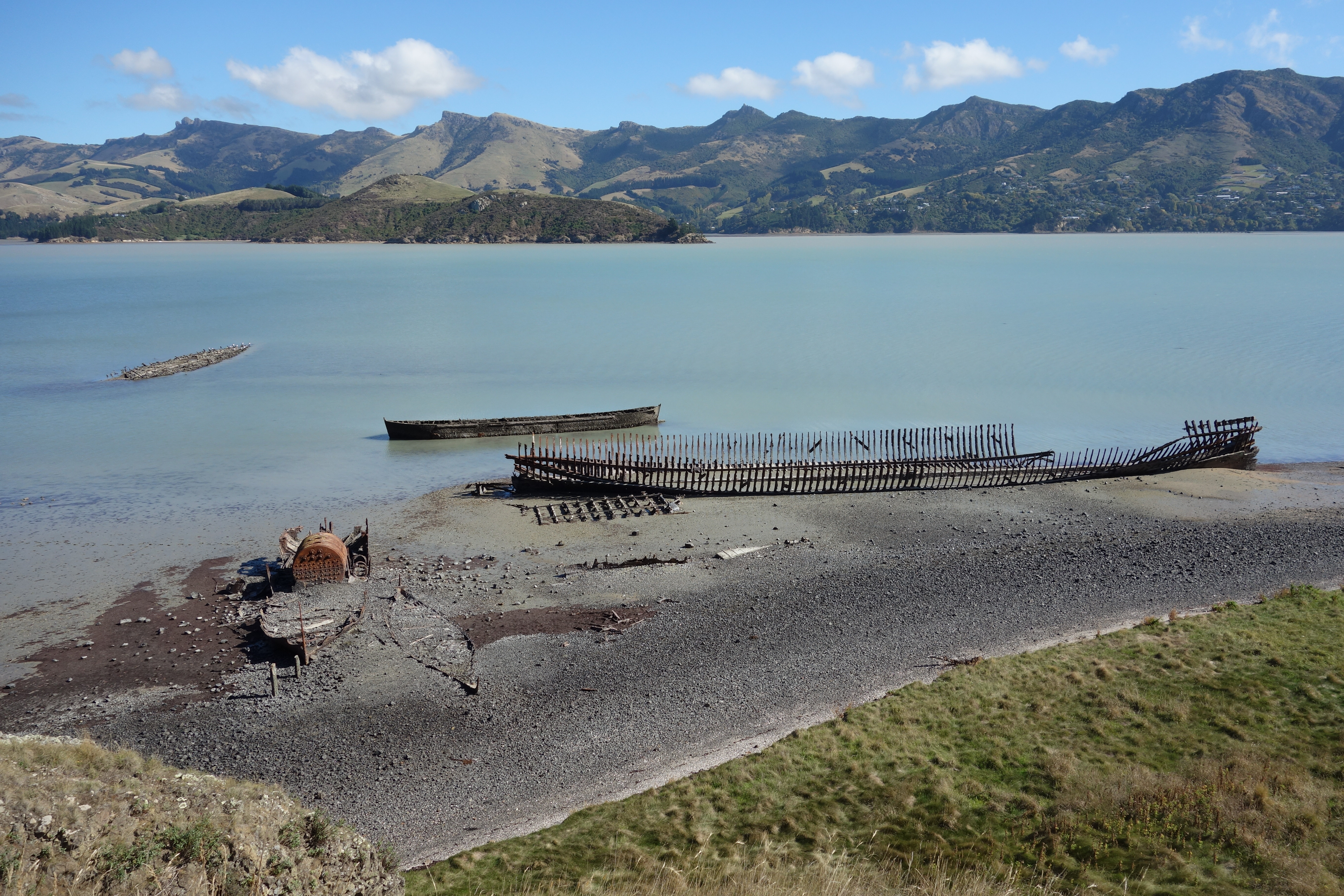
The wreck of Darra on Quail Island, lying prominently side-on.

In 1951, Darra was beached in the ships graveyard on Quail Island, beside the Mullogh and other wrecks, including the wrecks of two other former coal hulks. In April 1953, the army attempted to destroy the remains of Darra with explosives, but the explosion only blew a hole in the side of the hull. The wreck is still visible on the island.
