= USS LST-661 =

US navy tank landing ship

History

United States
- Name: USS LST-661
- Builder: American Bridge Company, Ambridge, Pennsylvania
- Laid down: 9 January 1944
- Launched: 30 March 1944
- Sponsored by: Mrs. J. H. Elder
- Commissioned: 28 April 1944
- Decommissioned: 29 August 1946
- Stricken: 13 September 1948
- Honours and awards: 1 battle star for World War II
- Fate: Sunk as target 25 July 1948

General characteristics
- Class & type: LST-542-class tank landing ship
- Displacement: 1,490 long tons (1,514 t) light; 4,080 long tons (4,145 t) full
- Length: 328 ft (100 m)
- Beam: 50 ft (15 m)
- Draft: 8 ft 2 in (2.49 m) forward; 14 ft 1 in (4.29 m) aft (full load)
- Propulsion: 2 × diesel engines, two shafts
- Speed: 10.8 knots (20.0 km/h; 12.4 mph)
- Complement: 7 officers, 204 enlisted men
- Armament: 6 × 40 mm guns; 6 × 20 mm guns

USS LST-661 was a United States Navy LST-542-class tank landing ship in commission from 1944 to 1946.

== Construction and commissioning ==
LST-661 was laid down on 9 January 1944 at Ambridge, Pennsylvania, by the American Bridge Company. She was launched on 30 March 1944, sponsored by Mrs. J. H. Elder, and commissioned on 28 April 1944.

== Service history ==
During World War II, LST-661 was assigned to the Pacific Theater of Operations and participated in the capture and occupation of the southern Palau Islands in September and October 1944. Following the war, she performed occupation duty in the Far East until early April 1946, when she returned to the United States.

== Decommissioning and disposal ==
LST-661 was decommissioned on 29 August 1946. She was used as a target on 14 May 1948 at Enewetak Atoll in the Operation Sandstone atomic bomb test series. On 25 July 1948, she was sunk because of her unsalvageable (and probably radioactive) condition.

LST-661 was stricken from the Navy List on 13 September 1948.

== Honors and awards ==
LST-661 earned one battle star for World War II service.

== Reference to LST-661 in With the Old Breed at Peleliu and Okinawa ==
In his memoir With the Old Breed at Pelelieu and Okinawa, Eugene B. Sledge expresses his gratitude to the crew of LST-661. In Chapter Four, "Assault into Hell", in the section titled "Death Patrol", he writes:

During one halt along a sandy road in the woods, we heard the words "hot chow" passed.
"The hell you say," someone said in disbelief.
"Straight dope; pork chops."
We couldn't believe it, but it was true. We filed past a cylindrical metal container, and each of us received a hot, delicious pork chop. The chow had been sent ashore for Company K by the crew of LST-661. I vowed if the chance ever came I would express my thanks to those sailors for that chow.

A footnote by the author reads, "I fulfilled that vow in July 1945 after the battle for Okinawa ended."
