= Cowan (1914 ship) =

Cowan was a fishing vessel of 30 tons net register, built in 1914. Cowan sank in 1948 near Lyttelton Harbour, New Zealand.

== Construction ==
Cowan, was a wooden steam trawler built at Sydney, Australia in 1914 by Woodleys Limited. Its length was 83.6ft, beam 18.4ft, depth 9.4ft.

== New Zealand fishing ==
By 1919, Cowan was operating from Auckland Harbour. Details of the vessel's catches around Manukau Harbour were given as evidence in a Fisheries Commission hearing in February 1919. Cowan visited ports throughout New Zealand.

In the 1920s, Cowan was owned by Auckland City Council, and fishing from Auckland Harbour. On 11 July 1920, Cowan's master was fined £10 for poaching fish, by trawling in the Hauraki Gulf prohibited area. Cowan's relatively shallow draft allowed it to berth directly alongside the fish market wharf in what is now Auckland's Wynyard Quarter.

Fishing continued throughout the 1920s and 1930s, both trawling and dredging for oysters from Bluff. Various other duties were undertaken including searching for vessels feared lost or wrecked.

== Final voyage and wreck ==
On 9 March 1948, Cowan was returning to Lyttelton Harbour from its fishing grounds. The master was Captain G. Mouncer. At about 9.30 p.m., the vessel struck the Port Levy rocks. Cowan was holed in its starboard side, and sank quickly. The crew consisted of seven men, all of whom were saved. The Court of Inquiry into the sinking of the Cowan found that no reprimand was warranted; the vessel had been steered by an uncertified member of the crew, and although the captain failed to monitor its course, he had stayed close to the wheel at all times.

At the time of Cowan's sinking, its owner was P. Feron and Son Limited, of Christchurch.

The wreck of Cowan lies in 8 m of water, near the rocks it struck. Little remains of the wreck.
