= USS Barrow =

1944 Gilliam-class attack transport

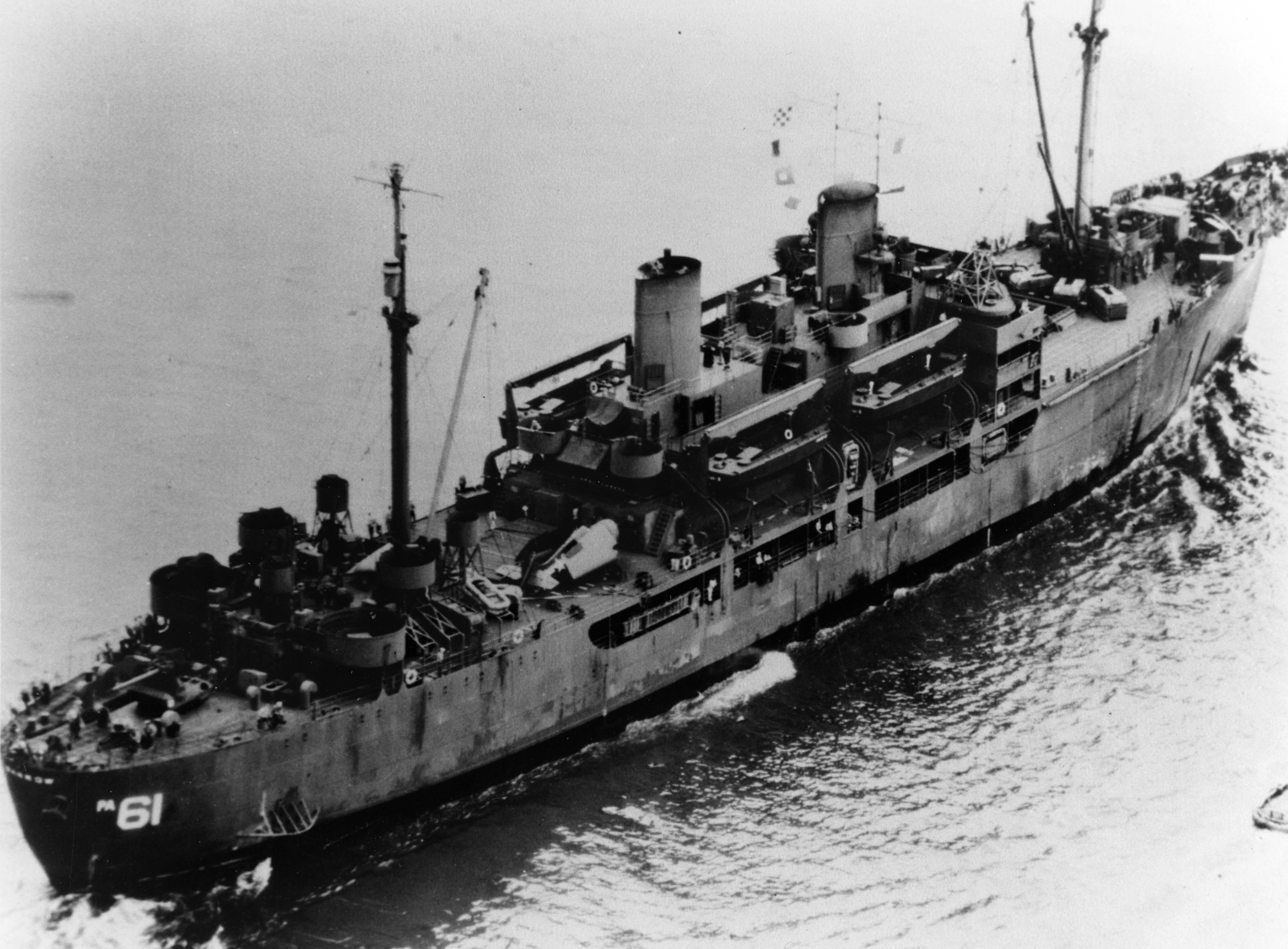

History

United States
- Name: USS Barrow
- Namesake: Barrow County, Georgia
- Laid down: 28 January 1944
- Launched: 11 May 1944
- Sponsored by: Miss Ruth M. LaFrance
- Commissioned: 28 September 1944
- Decommissioned: 28 August 1946
- Stricken: 28 May 1948
- Honors and awards: Two battle stars for World War II
- Fate: Scuttled off Kwajalein on 11 May 1948

General characteristics
- Class & type: Gilliam-class attack transport; Hull type S4-SE2-BD1
- Displacement: 4,247 tons (lt), 7,080 t.(fl)
- Length: 426 ft (130 m)
- Beam: 58 ft (18 m)
- Draft: 16 ft (4.9 m)
- Propulsion: Type: Turbo-electric engines; Horse Power: 6,600; Twin screws
- Boats & landing craft carried: 15 × LCVPs; 1 × gig
- Troops: 849 troops
- Complement: 320 officers and men
- Armament: 1 × 5-inch/38-caliber gun; 4 × twin 40mm cannon; 10 × 20mm cannon

USS Barrow (APA-61) was a Gilliam class attack transport serving in the United States Navy from 1944 to 1946. She was scuttled in 1948.

== History ==
The unnamed attack transport APA-61 was laid down on 28 January 1944 at Wilmington, California, by the Consolidated Steel Corporation, under a Maritime Commission contract (MC hull 1854); named for Barrow County, Georgia, on 11 March 1944; launched on 11 May 1944; accepted by the Navy on 27 September 1944; and commissioned on 28 September 1944 at San Pedro, Los Angeles. She was named for a county in north central Georgia

After fitting out at Terminal Island, California, the attack transport conducted her shakedown between 8 and 18 October near San Clemente and Santa Barbara Islands. She departed the west coast on 23 October with USS Lowndes (APA-154), USS Pickens (APA-190), and USS Hendry (APA-118), bound for Hawaii. Arriving in Pearl Harbor on the 29th, Barrow then conducted amphibious exercises at Maui with elements of the Army's 381st and 389th Regimental Combat Teams through the end of November.

After embarking two Navy construction battalions at Pearl Harbor, Barrow sailed for the Marianas on 15 December in company with USS Flint (CL-97), USS Charles S. Sperry (DD-697), and USS Haynsworth (DD-700). Barrow and her two escorts - Flint left the convoy soon after departure—steamed by way of Eniwetok in the Marshalls and reached Apra Harbor, Guam, on the 27th. Later that day, Barrow moved on to Tinian where she arrived on the 28th. She disembarked the two construction battalions the next day and headed back to Guam, arriving in Apra on the 30th. She loaded elements of the 2nd Marine Aircraft Wing and got underway for Hawaii in company with USS Rochambeau (AP-63) and USS Boyd (DD-544) on the last day of 1944.

The attack transport reached Pearl Harbor on 9 January 1945 and disembarked her passengers. The following day, she shifted berths to prepare for her first major operation—the assault on Iwo Jima, a small island in the Volcano Islands chain situated midway between Japan and American B-29 bases in the Marianas. Ideally suited to serve both as a base for fighter escort and as an emergency landing area for B-29's, Iwo Jima also figured prominently in Japanese defense plans. Barrow took on board a cargo of 8 inch ammunition to replenish the heavy cruisers supporting the landings. She embarked elements of the 5th Amphibious Corps, both at Pearl Harbor and at Maui, and then conducted four days of intense training at Maalaea Bay at Maui. Afterward, she spent nine days of logistics and rehabilitation at Pearl Harbor.

=== Iwo Jima ===
Barrow left Hawaii on 27 January 1945, bound via the Marshalls for the Marianas. She reached Eniwetok on 5 February, fueled from USS Gemsbok (IX-117) and provisioned before resuming the voyage to the Marianas on the 7th. She reached Saipan on 11 February. Bad weather postponed her scheduled practice landings for two days so that only a single rehearsal was carried out off Tinian's western shores on the 13th. The voyage to the Volcano Islands proved uneventful. Barrow - attached to Transport Group "Baker" (Task Group (TG) 53.2) - reached the immediate vicinity of Iwo Jima at dawn on D day, 19 February 1945, and lowered her first boats to the water at 0645. Soon, she sent the medical section of her beach party to the hospital configured tank landing ship, LST(H)-930, before transferring 76 marines to USS Starr (AKA-67) and sending nine of her boats to Lowndes. Barrow then remained in Transport Area "Baker", while the first assault waves landed at 0900. Surprisingly little fire greeted the initial landings, but soon the well dug in Japanese defenders began laying down a withering barrage from a variety of weapons. Before the day was out, 566 Americans were dead and 1,755 wounded.

At 1452, Barrow embarked her first casualty, a man wounded by a shell fragment, the first of 169 that the ship would treat over the ensuing days. Five died of their wounds while still on the ship. That evening, the attack transport retired seaward, a movement that set the pattern for her service off Iwo.

While the bloody fighting went on ashore over the next few days, Barrow waited offshore for the order to unload. Reports of enemy planes abounded, but none approached the attack transport near enough for her crewmen to see them or fire on them. At 1445 on the 21st, the ship finally received instructions to land the advance echelon of her embarked headquarters company, and she carried out the order later that day. Barrow transferred powder charges, projectiles, detonating fuzes, and service primers to USS Tuscaloosa (CA-37) on the 24th, and then disembarked portions of a medical unit and an antiaircraft unit. Later that day, she shifted berths closer to shore and commenced unloading more 5th Amphibious Force material and supplies. The next day, she replenished USS Salt Lake City (CA-25)'s supply of 8 inch ammunition. Following her retirement for the night of 26 and 27 February, Barrow discharged cargo to LST-787 on the 27th and then unloaded the rest of her stock of 8 inch ammunition to USS Pensacola (CA-24).

After anchoring off Iwo Jima's southeastern shore overnight, Barrow got underway on 1 March to pick up empty powder cans from the destroyers in the vicinity. Then, after unloading the last of her cargo to LSM 207, she cleared the area for the Marianas in company with her fellow attack transports Lowndes, Pickens, Logan and Sanborn.

Reaching Saipan on 4 March, Barrow disembarked 58 men wounded at Iwo Jima and soon began to get ready for her next operation—the assault on Okinawa, largest of the Ryukyu Islands. On 6 and 7 March, while in Tanapag Harbor, Barrow embarked officers and men of the 2nd Marine Division and loaded 3rd Amphibious Corps cargo. After shifting to Saipan Harbor later that day, the attack transport and her embarked troops spent the period from 7 to 16 March provisioning and preparing for the upcoming operation with emergency drills and disembarkation exercises. Barrow then conducted exercises off the west coast of Tinian, rehearsing a "demonstration landing" on the 17th and simulating a "landing in reserve" on the 18th. A heavy sea on the 19th prevented a rehearsal of a full-scale attack scheduled for that day, but it finally took place on the 24th.

=== Okinawa ===
On the morning of 27 March, Barrow - attached to Task Group (TG) 51.2 for the Battle of Okinawa landings - sailed for the Ryukyus and made landfall early on Easter Sunday, 1 April. Barrow's men manned their battle stations at 0520; and, about an hour later, the ship took her assigned position in a diversionary feint to confuse Okinawa's defenders. Six of her LCVP's—each carrying 13 marines—took part in the operation. That evening, the task group retired to seaward to return the following morning to carry out another feint.

The 1st and 6th Marine Divisions landed practically without opposition, and, over the next few days, saw comparatively light resistance. Yet, as they progressed, the Japanese reacted against the invasion fleet. Kamikaze tactics - tested with devastating success in the Philippines campaign - began the first day, inflicting damage to USS West Virginia (BB-48), USS Achernar (AKA-53), USS Tyrrell (AKA-80) and USS Alpine (APA-92). Dive bombers claimed hits on a minesweeper, and other planes bombed attack transport USS Elmore (APA-42). The next day, 2 April, four more attack transports feIt the hot breath of the "Divine Wind".

At 0630 on 2 April, while Barrow was returning from her night retirement station, she spotted a Nakajima Ki-27 "Nate" Army fighter crossing her bow. Two of her 40 millimeter mounts took the plane under fire and scored hits before the plane, obviously damaged, "disappeared in the low clouds off the starboard beam...." At 1110, Barrow's commanding officer was placed in charge of Task Unit (TU) 51.2.17, and the ship proceeded to the inner transport area off the western shores of Okinawa. She anchored at 1925 and, two hours later, began unloading vehicles to the tank landing craft, LCT-1265.

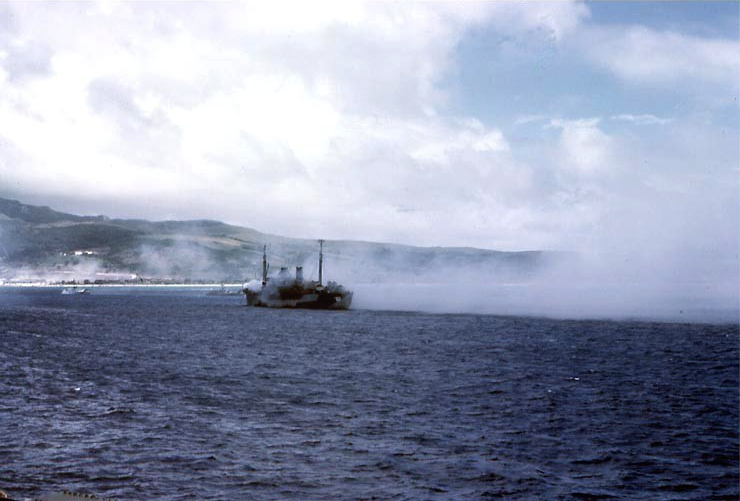
USS Barrow emitting smoke

For the next four days, as the number of kamikaze-damaged ships steadily mounted, Barrow waited at anchor for orders to unload. Each evening, the ship's smoke generators would emit clouds of chemical smoke to hide the ship from enemy aircraft that were reported lurking about. However, Japanese planes did not appear in great number until the 6th, when 355 enemy aircraft swarmed toward the fleet. That day, Barrow's gunners splashed one bogey that appeared from off the starboard bow, about 3,000 yards ahead of the ship, and contributed to the intense barrage sent up by American warships in her vicinity. Shifting her berth later on, Barrow took under fire an Aichi D3A "Val" bomber approaching the area at about 4,000 yards range. Every gun that Barrow could bring to bear swung around and began firing. The ship made several 40-millimeter hits before her 5-inch gun scored a direct hit that sent the plane into a steep and fatal glide that ended when the aircraft hit the water and disintegrated.

On the 7th, Barrow resumed unloading cargo, working with her own LCVPs as well as a variety of amphibious ships and craft. By that afternoon, nearly all of the ship's embarked troops had gone ashore; and, by 2320 on the 8th, all of her cargo had been discharged. On the 9th, Barrow left Okinawa and headed for Saipan, having emerged from her second major invasion unscathed. The ship reached Saipan Harbor on 13 April. Barrow spent the entire month of May enjoying "rest and rehabilitation" at Saipan. On the 7th, Rear Admiral Jerauld Wright and his staff, embarked in the attack transport, and she served as flagship for Amphibious Squadron 5 until USS Ancon (AGC-4) arrived in the area. The admiral disembarked on 4 June, and his staff transferred to the command ships USS Mount McKinley (AGC-7) and USS Appalachian (AGC-1).

Barrow departed Saipan on 4 June, set a course for the Solomons and reached Florida Island eight days later. Underway for the New Hebrides on the 15th, the attack transport arrived at Espiritu Santo on the 17th. She waited a week for orders, then loaded cargo from the 26th to the 29th and finally departed the New Hebrides for the Marianas. Discharging cargo and disembarking passengers at Tinian from 7 to 10 July, she then shifted to Guam overnight on the 10th and 11th. Soon, however, she headed on for the United States, reaching San Francisco on 30 July.

=== Operation "Magic Carpet" ===
The end of the war found Barrow on the west coast, undergoing voyage repairs and alterations. Following this yard work, she sailed for the Philippines, disembarking passengers at Samar on 17 September and at Manila on the 22d. Next assigned to Operation "Magic Carpet" - the massive sealift returning servicemen home to the United States for discharge - Barrow returned to the west coast of the United States. While en route to Portland, Oregon, Barrow assisted the crippled merchantman, SS Ben F. Dixon, which had lost her propeller. The attack transport embarked the merchantmen's passengers and took the ship in tow until the rescue tug, ATR-73, arrived on the scene and took over the task.

After repairs at Portland, Oregon, Barrow got underway on 2 December for the Philippines, but a malfunctioning feed pump in her forward engine room forced her into Pearl Harbor for repairs. Barrow put into Pearl Harbor on 13 December and underwent brief repairs alongside USS Yukon (AF-9) between the 14th and the 19th before she resumed her passage to Leyte on 31 December. Her only cargo consisted of 11 cases of Philippine currency (valued at $700,000 U.S.) consigned to the Commander, Philippine Sea Frontier.

USS Barrow earned two battle stars during World War II.

=== Operation Crossroads ===
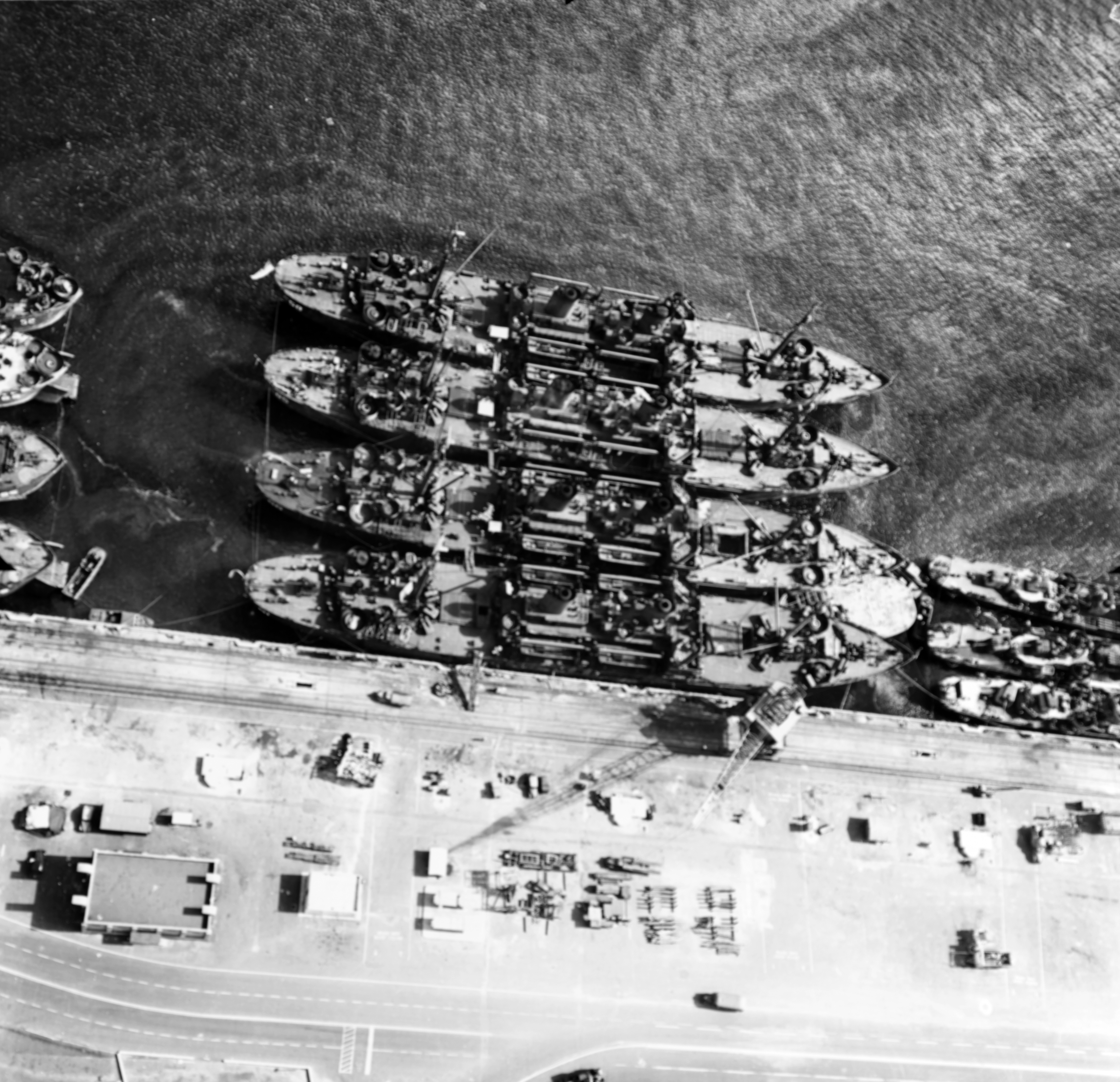
USS Appling (APA-58) lies outboard (top) of sister ships Barrow (APA-61), Brule (APA-66) and Gasconade (APA-85), at the Pearl Harbor Naval Shipyard, 27 February 1946, as they are readied for Operation Crossroads.

After bringing back her second lift of "Magic Carpet" men to Pearl Harbor—where she arrived on 5 February 1946 – Barrow was assigned to the Commandant, 14th Naval District, in connection with "special tests." Barrow remained in Hawaiian waters into the spring of 1946, being stripped for her final mission, Operation Crossroads. Assigned to Transportation Division (TransDiv) 92, Joint Task Force 1, Barrow conducted a brief period of training before she sailed for the Marshall Islands in company with USS Butte (APA-68), USS Carlisle (APA-69), USS Crittenden (APA-77), USS Gasconade (APA-85), and USS Geneva (APA-86). Arriving on 1 May, Barrow was soon fitted out with special items of equipment and cameras to record the effect of an atomic blast. As one of the 84 target vessels, Barrow would remain at anchor in Bikini Atoll lagoon for the detonations that were scheduled to take place in July.

On 30 June, Barrow's entire crew was transferred to the attack transport USS Bexar (APA-237), to be housed during and following the two scheduled detonations, and from this ship witnessed Test "Able"—the detonation at 0900 on 1 July 1946. Barrow lay at anchor 1,335 yards from "ground zero", and sustained moderate damage. Reboarded by radiological teams on the 2d, she was regarded as "Radiologically safe". Barrow's officers and men reembarked on 3 July, and performed "routine activities" on board until again ordered on board Bexar on 24 July. Two days later, anchored 2,000 yards from "ground zero" for test "Baker", Barrow sustained heavy radiological damage.

Decommissioned at Bikini on 28 August 1946, Barrow was taken to Kwajalein for radiological studies and observation before being scuttled just south of Kwajalein on 11 May 1948. Her name was struck from the Navy list on 28 May 1948.
