= USS Berrien =

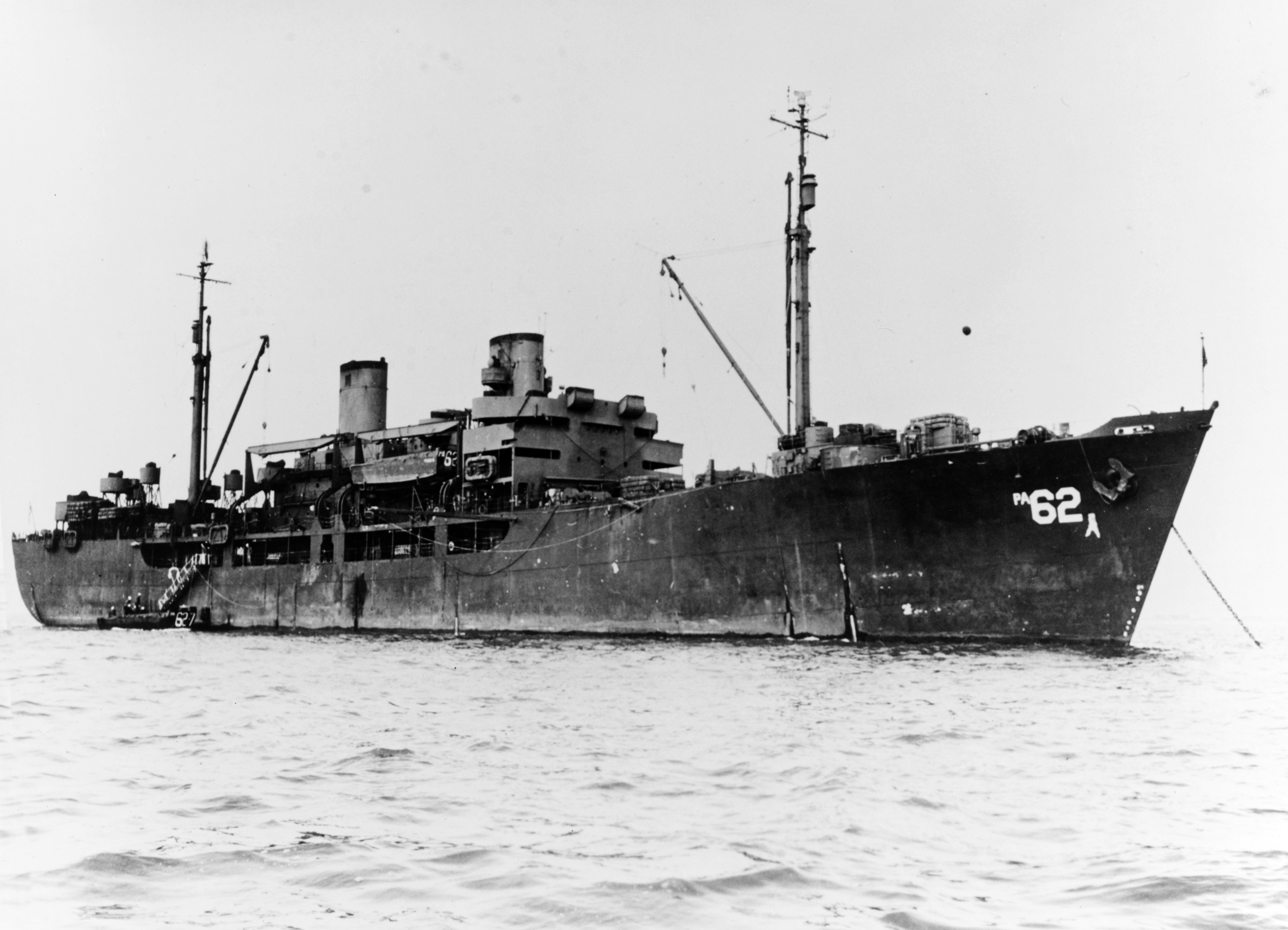
- Berrien, circa in 1945

History

United States
- Name: USS Berrien
- Namesake: Berrien County, Georgia; Berrien County, Michigan
- Builder: Consolidated Steel
- Laid down: 23 February 1944
- Launched: 20 May 1944
- Sponsored by: Mrs. Jack Love
- Acquired: 7 October 1944
- Commissioned: 8 October 1944
- Decommissioned: 17 May 1946
- Stricken: 1 August 1947
- Honours and awards: Two battle stars for World War II service
- Fate: Sold for scrapping, 17 May 1966

General characteristics
- Class & type: Gilliam-class attack transport
- Displacement: 4,247 tons (lt), 7,080 t.(fl)
- Length: 426 ft (130 m)
- Beam: 58 ft (18 m)
- Draft: 16 ft (4.9 m)
- Propulsion: Westinghouse turboelectric drive, 2 boilers, 2 propellers, Design shaft horsepower 6,000
- Speed: 17 knots
- Capacity: 47 Officers, 802 Enlisted
- Crew: 27 Officers, 295 Enlisted
- Armament: 1 x 5"/38 caliber dual-purpose gun mount, 4 x twin 40mm gun mounts, 10 x single 20mm gun mounts
- Notes: MCV Hull No. 1855, hull type S4-SE2-BD1

USS Berrien (APA-62) was a Gilliam-class attack transport that served with the United States Navy from 1944 to 1946. She was scrapped in 1966.

== History ==
Berrien was named after counties in Georgia and Michigan. She was launched 20 March 1944 under a United States Maritime Commission contract by the Consolidated Steel Corporation at Wilmington, Los Angeles; acquired by the Navy on 7 October 1944; and commissioned on 8 October 1944. The ship was nicknamed the "Mighty B" and the "Blue Bitch".

=== World War II ===
==== Invasion of Iwo Jima ====
She departed Pearl Harbor for operations in the Pacific on 27 January 1945. Berrien arrived in time to participate in the invasion of Iwo Jima.

==== Invasion of Okinawa ====
Approximately one month later, the ship was again on her way into enemy territory with Transport Squadron 15 as part of the invasion of Okinawa. On Easter Sunday morning, the Berrien and other ships of the task force appeared off the southwest shores of Okinawa as part of a feint to throw enemy forces off balance and pave the way for the main landings on the western beaches of Hagushi. That morning, 2 U.S. Navy ships were hit by kamikaze planes. However, the feint succeeded and it was used again the next day. This worked well and losses were minimal.

The Berrien cruised offshore for about a week, waiting orders to proceed to Hagushi to unload her cargo. She was finally sent into enemy waters, accompanied by a destroyer escort and the destroyers USS Ammen and USS Brown. While en route, Berrien encountered a mine and had near misses by 4 torpedoes fired by a Japanese submarine. She arrived at Okinawa and remained there for 10 days, during which she was under constant attack from shore batteries and kamikazes. She received a hit near her stacks which wounded a radioman, making him the 18th Berrien crewman to receive the Purple Heart.

==== Air-sea rescue ====
From Okinawa, she sailed back to Saipan, and received orders to head to the South Pacific. The crew was initiated from 'pollywogs' into respectable 'shellbacks' at the Equator. From Tulagi she steamed to Nouméa, New Caledonia, then back to the Mariana Islands. On the morning of 3 July, on the way into Guam, she participated in the air-sea rescue of 10 downed Army fliers. From Guam she returned to the US. While in San Francisco, the cease fire order was given in the Pacific theater. The war had ended.

=== Post-war ===
Berrien returned to the Pacific and headed to Manila, then to Aomori, Japan as part of the initial allied landings in northern Honshu. From there, she steamed north to Otaru, in Hokkaidō, northernmost of the main Japanese home islands, for another initial landing on Nippon soil. At this point, the crew was asked if they wished to take part in the Bikini Atoll tests. There were not enough volunteers to man the ship, so she received orders to sail from Otaru into Tokyo Bay to take on Marines and Sailors returning home. She docked in Seattle, where she received many new crew members to replace those discharged, as well as a new captain. She returned to the Orient and was in Shanghai, China on the Huangpu River in February 1946, but returned to the United States shortly afterwards. Berrien had 166 plank owners, and of the 321 enlisted men, 173 were with her from her commissioning, as were 20 of the 31 officers.

==== Decommissioning ====
She was decommissioned in May 1946, returned to the United States Maritime Commission on 12 August 1947, and placed in the Suisun Bay Reserve Fleet. She participated in the Fleet Repair Program from 11 July 1955 to 28 October 1955 until returned to Suisun Bay. She was sold as scrap to Zidell Explorations, Inc. on 17 May 1966 and delivered 16 August 1966.

=== Decorations ===
Berrien received two battle stars for World War II service in the Pacific Theatre.
