= USS Gasconade =

U.S. Navy attack transport

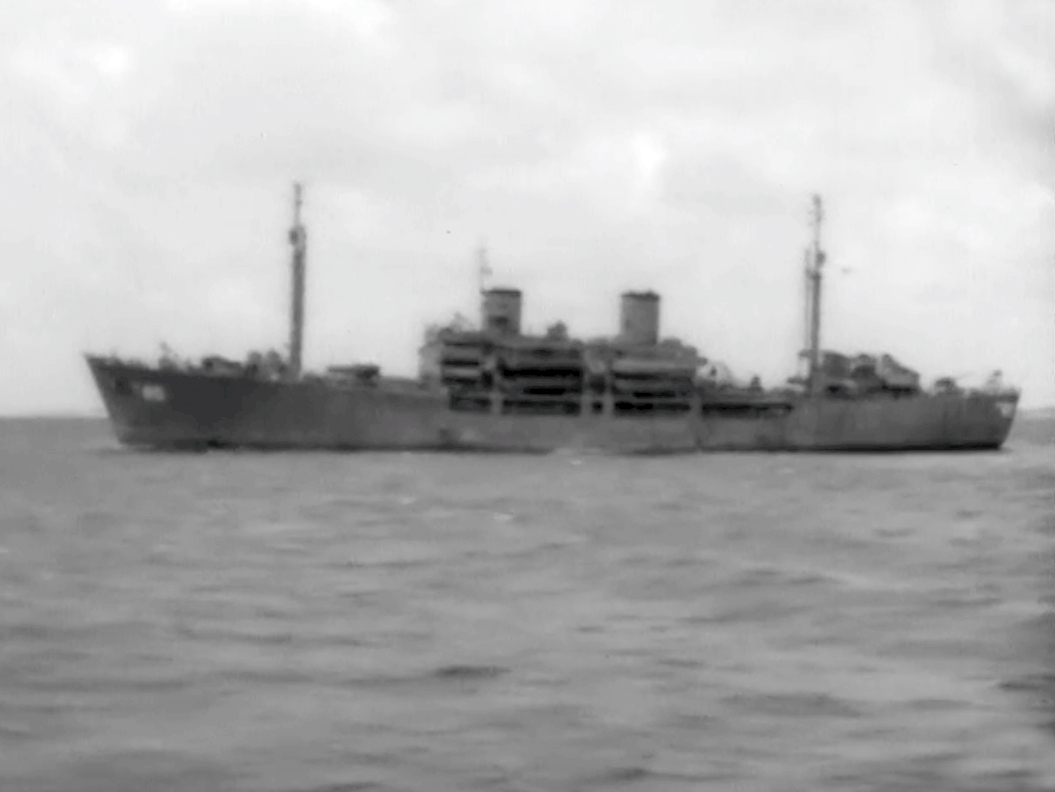
- Gasconade arriving at Bikini Atoll, in late May 1946

History

United States
- Name: USS Gasconade (APA-85)
- Namesake: Gasconade County, Missouri
- Builder: Consolidated Steel
- Laid down: 7 November 1944
- Launched: 23 January 1945
- Sponsored by: Mrs. Winnie Cave
- Acquired: 10 March 1945
- Commissioned: 11 March 1945
- Decommissioned: 28 August 1946
- Fate: Sunk as target ship, 21 July 1948

General characteristics
- Class & type: Gilliam-class attack transport
- Displacement: 4,247 tons (lt), 7,080 t.(fl)
- Length: 426 ft (130 m)
- Beam: 58 ft (18 m)
- Draft: 16 ft (4.9 m)
- Propulsion: Westinghouse turboelectric drive, 2 boilers, 2 propellers, Design shaft horsepower 6,000
- Speed: 16.9 knots
- Capacity: 47 Officers, 802 Enlisted
- Crew: 27 Officers, 295 Enlisted
- Armament: 1 x 5"/38 caliber dual-purpose gun mount, 4 x twin 40 mm gun mounts, 10 x single 20 mm gun mounts
- Notes: MCV Hull No. ?, hull type S4-SE2-BD1

USS Gasconade (APA-85) was a Gilliam-class attack transport that served with the United States Navy from 1944 to 1946. She was sunk as a target in 1948.

== History ==
Gasconade was named after a county in Missouri. She was laid down 7 November 1944 under Maritime Commission contract by the Consolidated Steel Corporation at Wilmington, Los Angeles; launched 23 January 1945; acquired by the Navy 10 March 1945, and commissioned 11 March 1945 at San Pedro, Los Angeles.

=== World War II ===
After shakedown, Gasconade departed San Francisco 8 May on a troop transport voyage to the Philippines. Steaming via Pearl Harbor, Eniwetok, and Ulithi, she arrived Samar 3 June. Loaded with mail and cargo, she steamed to San Francisco from 18 June to 6 July; thence transported additional troops to the Philippines. Arriving Leyte Gulf 2 August, she served as receiving ship until mid-August when she proceeded to Manila Bay to stage for the Allied occupation of Japan.

=== Post-war ===
Gasconade departed Manila 20 August; and, as part of a huge transport task force carrying the first sea-borne occupation forces to Japan, she entered Tokyo Bay 2 September while surrender terms were being signed on board USS Missouri (BB-63). She debarked her troops at Yokosuka 3 September; steamed to the Philippines from 4 to 11 September, then carried more occupation troops from Mindanao to Kure, Japan, from 19 September to 6 October.

==== Operation Magic Carpet ====
After returning to Leyte Gulf 11 October, Gasconade embarked military passengers and sailed for the United States 17 October as part of Operation Magic Carpet. She reached Portland, Oregon, 2 November, transported occupation troops to Nagoya, Japan, 18 November to 5 December; and sailed 8 December on another Magic Carpet voyage, arriving Seattle 19 December. After carrying a garrison force to Guam from 13 to 29 January 1946, she voyaged to Pearl Harbor from 30 January to 8 February with returning veterans embarked.

=== Operation Crossroads ===
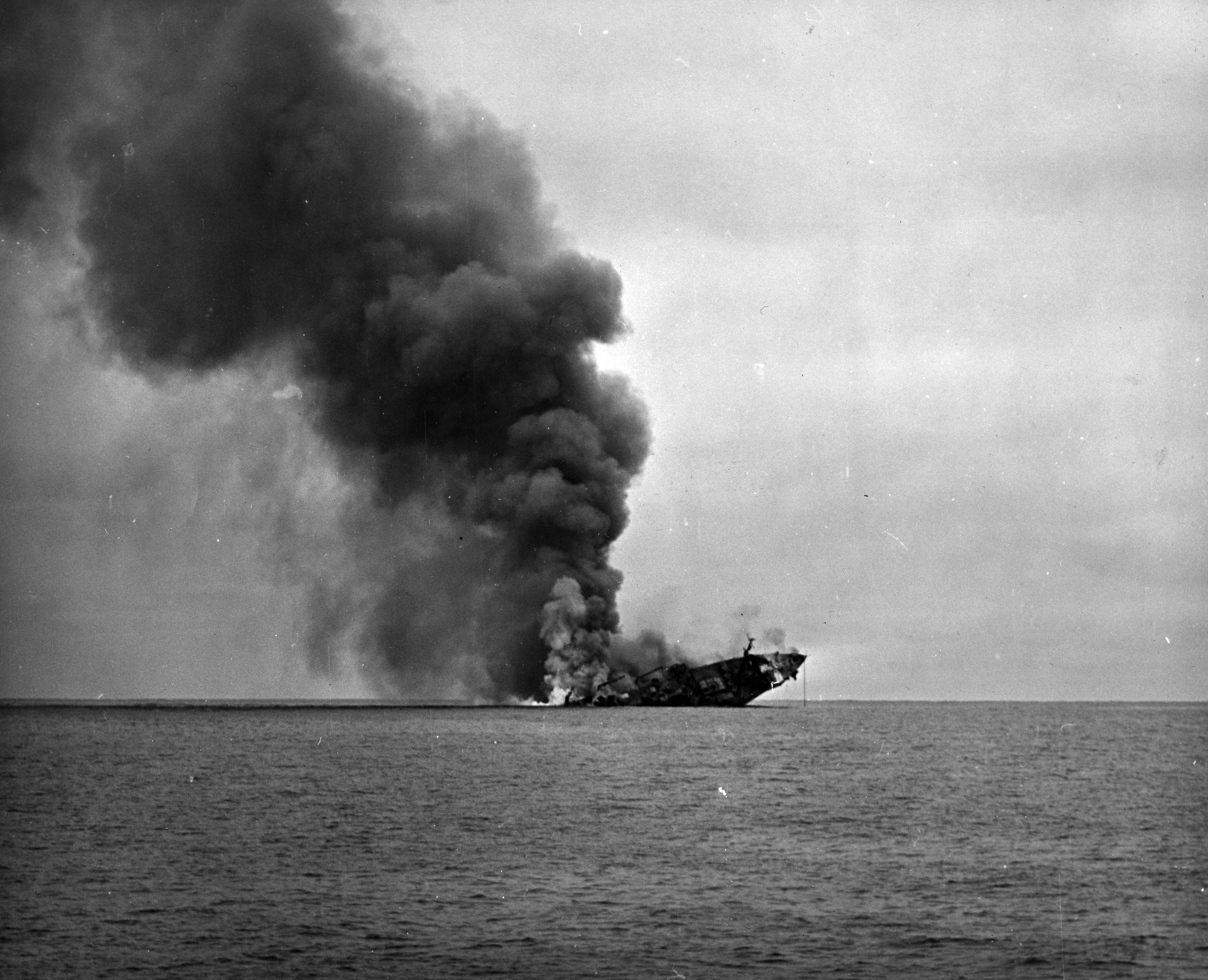
Gasconade being sunk, 1948.

Assigned to Joint Task Force 1, Gasconade during the next 3 months prepared for Operation Crossroads, a program of nuclear tests in the Marshall Islands. Departing Pearl Harbor 18 May in company with Transport Division 92, she reached Bikini Atoll, Marshalls, 30 May. On 22 June her crew transferred to USS Bexar (APA-237). Designated a target ship for the experiments, she survived an atomic blast 18 July.

=== Decommissioning and fate ===
Gasconade decommissioned in the Marshall Islands 28 August. In December she was taken in tow at Kwajalein for transfer to the United States, where she arrived San Francisco 27 January 1947. After undergoing structural and radioactivity tests, she was redesignated a target ship in March 1948. She was sunk by torpedoes 21 July in the Pacific Ocean off lower California.
