= USS Gilliam =

Attack transport ship sunk at Bikini atoll

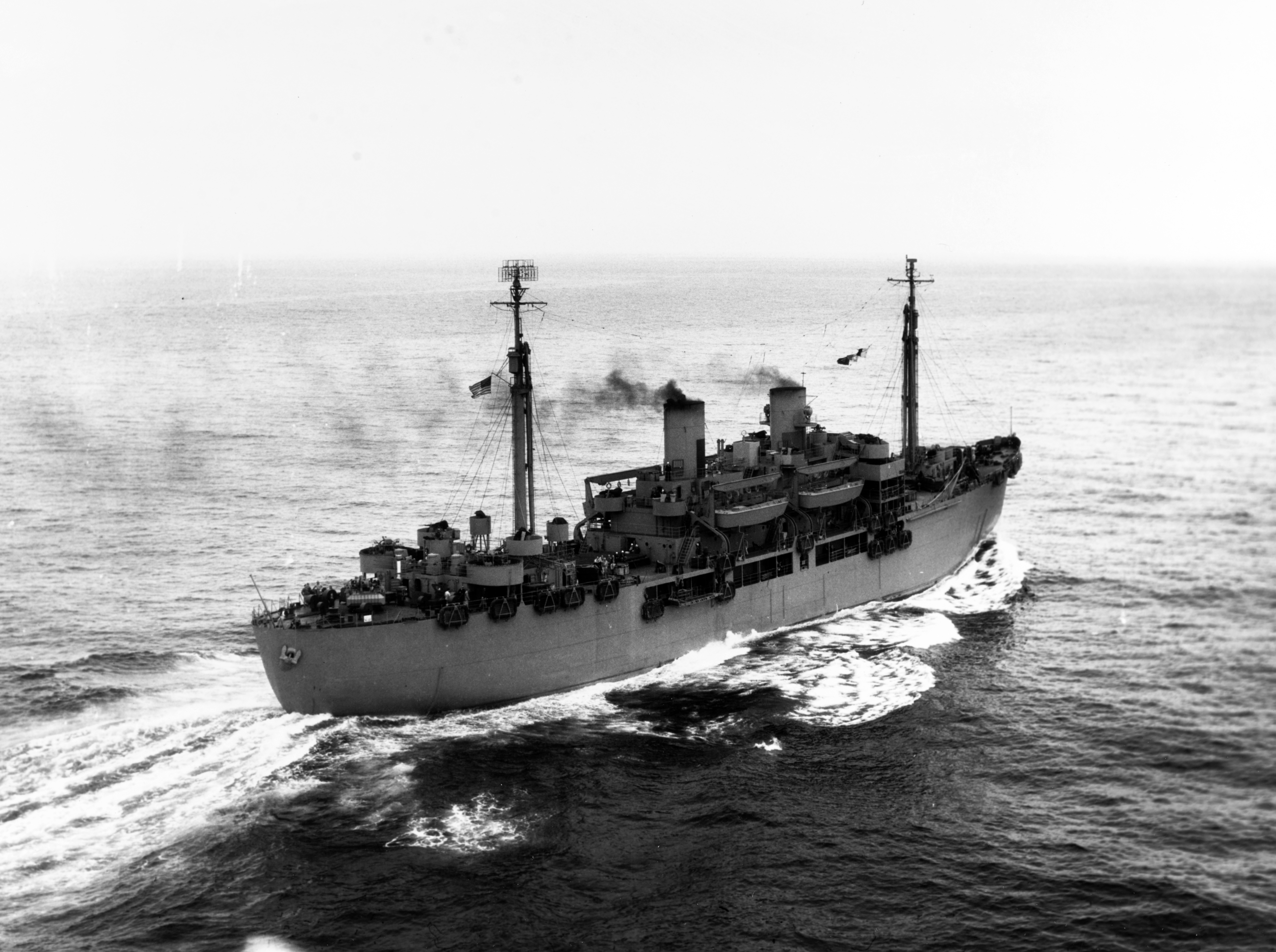
- USS Gilliam (APA-57)

History

United States
- Name: USS Gilliam (APA-57)
- Namesake: Gilliam County, Oregon
- Builder: Consolidated Steel
- Launched: 28 March 1944
- Sponsored by: Mrs. A. O. Williams of Wilmington
- Acquired: 31 July 1944
- Commissioned: 1 August 1944
- Decommissioned: N/A
- Stricken: N/A
- Honours and awards: Two battle stars for World War II service
- Fate: Sunk during Operation Crossroads on 1 July 1946 at Bikini Atoll

General characteristics
- Class & type: Gilliam-class attack transport
- Displacement: 4,247 tons (lt), 7,080 t.(fl)
- Length: 426 ft (130 m)
- Beam: 58 ft (18 m)
- Draft: 16 ft (4.9 m)
- Propulsion: Westinghouse turboelectric drive, 2 boilers, 2 propellers, Design shaft horsepower 6,000
- Speed: 16.9 knots
- Capacity: 47 Officers, 802 Enlisted
- Complement: 27 Officers 295 Enlisted
- Armament: 1 x 5"/38 caliber dual-purpose gun mount, 4 x twin 40mm gun mounts, 10 x single 20mm gun mounts
- Notes: MCV Hull No. 1850, hull type S4-SE2-BD1

USS Gilliam (APA-57), named for Gilliam County in Oregon, was the lead ship in her class of attack transports serving in the United States Navy during World War II.

== Construction and commissioning ==
Gilliam was launched on 28 March 1944 under a Maritime Commission contract by the Consolidated Steel Corporation at Wilmington in Los Angeles, California, sponsored by Mrs. A. O. Williams of Wilmington. The U.S. Navy acquired Gilliam on 31 July 1944 and commissioned her on 1 August 1944.

== Operational history ==
=== World War II ===
The first of a new type of attack transport, Gilliam stood out of San Francisco Bay 16 October 1944 with 750 United States Army troops for Oro Bay, New Guinea, and delivered them to that port 4 November. Embarking nearly 1000 troops of the U.S. 11th Airborne Division, she sailed a week later and off-loaded her passengers at Leyte, subsequently returning to Humboldt Bay, New Guinea, 22 November. Gilliam got underway again 29 November under orders to steam to Leyte Gulf and embark elements of the 6th Army Headquarters for passage to Lingayen Gulf.

==== Heavy air attacks ====
Gilliam was part of a 36-ship convoy heading toward the Philippines when, on 5 December 1944, the convoy came under heavy air attack while 100 miles (160 km) from Leyte Gulf. At 12:18 Gilliam spotted a plane coming in low over the water at deck level, headed for the middle of the convoy. Coming under limited fire, the Japanese plane released a torpedo two minutes later which hit SS Antoine Saugrain. Just after 12:30 two more planes came in low and fast, and one got another torpedo into the stricken merchantman, which was then dead in the water.

Intense fire from the convoy drove the planes off, but later that afternoon another Japanese aircraft dove in at 15:30, and after running into heavy fire, made a suicide crash on SS Marcus Daly. The Japanese caught her on the bow at waterline and started fires and explosions. A second kamikaze tried his luck but missed and crashed into the sea after repeated hits from the convoy's gunners.

Anton Saugraine and Marcus Daly were kept afloat by quick damage control, but the former ship was attacked again the next day while under tow and finally sunk. During this engagement, Gilliam's unflinching crew stood at General Quarters for nearly 12 hours and the ship reached Leyte on 6 December without damage.

==== Invasion of Luzon ====
At Leyte Gilliam acted as receiving ship for the crews of damaged warships and undertook medical and salvage operations in spite of continued air alerts. After embarking over 500 soldiers at Tacloban, she sailed from that port 7 January 1945 bringing troops to Lingayen Gulf in support of the invasion. She returned to Leyte on 14 January to embark elements of the 32nd Infantry Division and brought them safely back to Lingayen Gulf 27 January.

==== Invasion of Okinawa ====
After loading casualties for passage to Leyte, Gilliam sailed from that port 2 February to embark Marines of the III Amphibious Corps at Guadalcanal and conducted training exercises in preparation for the coming invasion of Okinawa.

Gilliam closed Okinawa on 1 April and in the face of kamikaze attacks debarked reconnaissance parties of the 3rd Amphibious Corps and unloaded vital cargo. On 5 April she sailed for the United States via Saipan and Pearl Harbor, mooring at San Francisco 27 April for drydock repairs.

Subsequently Gilliam embarked men of the 6th Seabee Battalion a Port Hueneme, California, and sailed 28 May 1945 for Okinawa via Eniwetok and Ulithi. She off-loaded cargo and passengers at Okinawa and then headed back to San Francisco.

=== After hostilities ===
Gilliam arrived back at San Francisco on 10 August, where nearly 1,000 troops were embarked and brought to Pearl Harbor on 27 August. Men of the Headquarters and Service Battalions, 5th Amphibious Corps came on board at Hawaii, and Gilliam sailed 1 September for Sasebo, Japan, and put her occupation troops ashore 3 weeks later.

On 25 September 1945 she got underway for Manila, and after embarking more than 450 veterans of the 33rd Infantry Division at Lingayen Gulf, she carried them to Sasebo, arriving 15 October.

==== Operation Magic Carpet ====
After returning to Cebu in the Philippines 29 October, she became part of the Operation Magic Carpet fleet and sailed 2 November with 1,000 sailors and soldiers, debarking them at Portland, Oregon, 21 November 1945.

=== Operation Crossroads ===
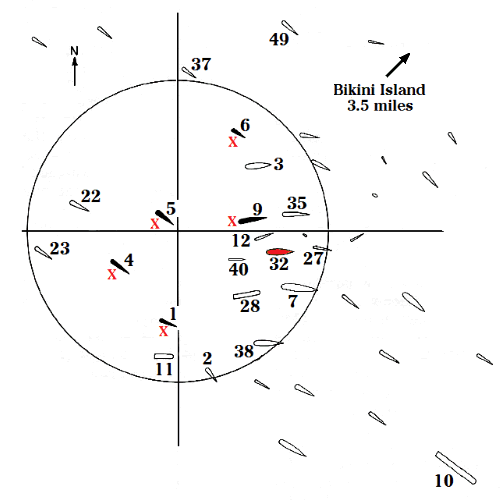
Map showing Gilliam (5) near the center of the Able blast.

Following a voyage to Samar, Gilliam moored at Pearl Harbor on 16 February 1946 and prepared to participate in the atomic bomb tests at Bikini Atoll in the summer of 1946. On the morning of 1 July 1946, Gilliam, a target ship for Test Able, was the first ship struck by the blast and sunk quickly in Bikini lagoon, badly damaged. She was decommissioned, 5 July 1946 and struck from the Naval Register, 20 July 1946.

=== Decorations ===
- Asiatic-Pacific Campaign Medal with three battle stars
- World War II Victory Medal
- Navy Occupation Service Medal (two awards)

Gilliam received three battle stars for World War II service and two Navy Occupation Service Medals for her actions during the occupation of Japan.
