= USS Rochambeau =

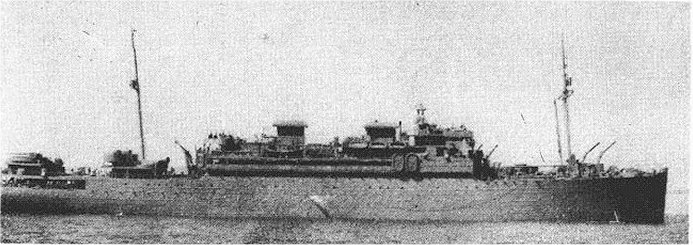
- USS Rochambeau (AP-63) at anchor, date and location unknown

History

United States
- Namesake: Comte de Rochambeau
- Launched: 14 May 1931
- Commissioned: 27 April 1942
- Decommissioned: 25 February 1945
- Stricken: March 1945
- Fate: Broken up 1960

General characteristics
- Displacement: 14,242 tons
- Length: 470 ft 10 in (143.5 m)
- Beam: 63 ft 11 in (19.5 m)
- Draft: 36 ft 0 in (11.0 m)
- Speed: 15 knots (28 km/h)
- Complement: 381 officers and enlisted men
- Armament: 1 × single 5"/38 dual-purpose gun mount, 4 × single 3 in (76 mm) dual-purpose gun mounts, 8 × 1.1"/75-caliber guns, replaced with 8 × single 20 mm gun mounts

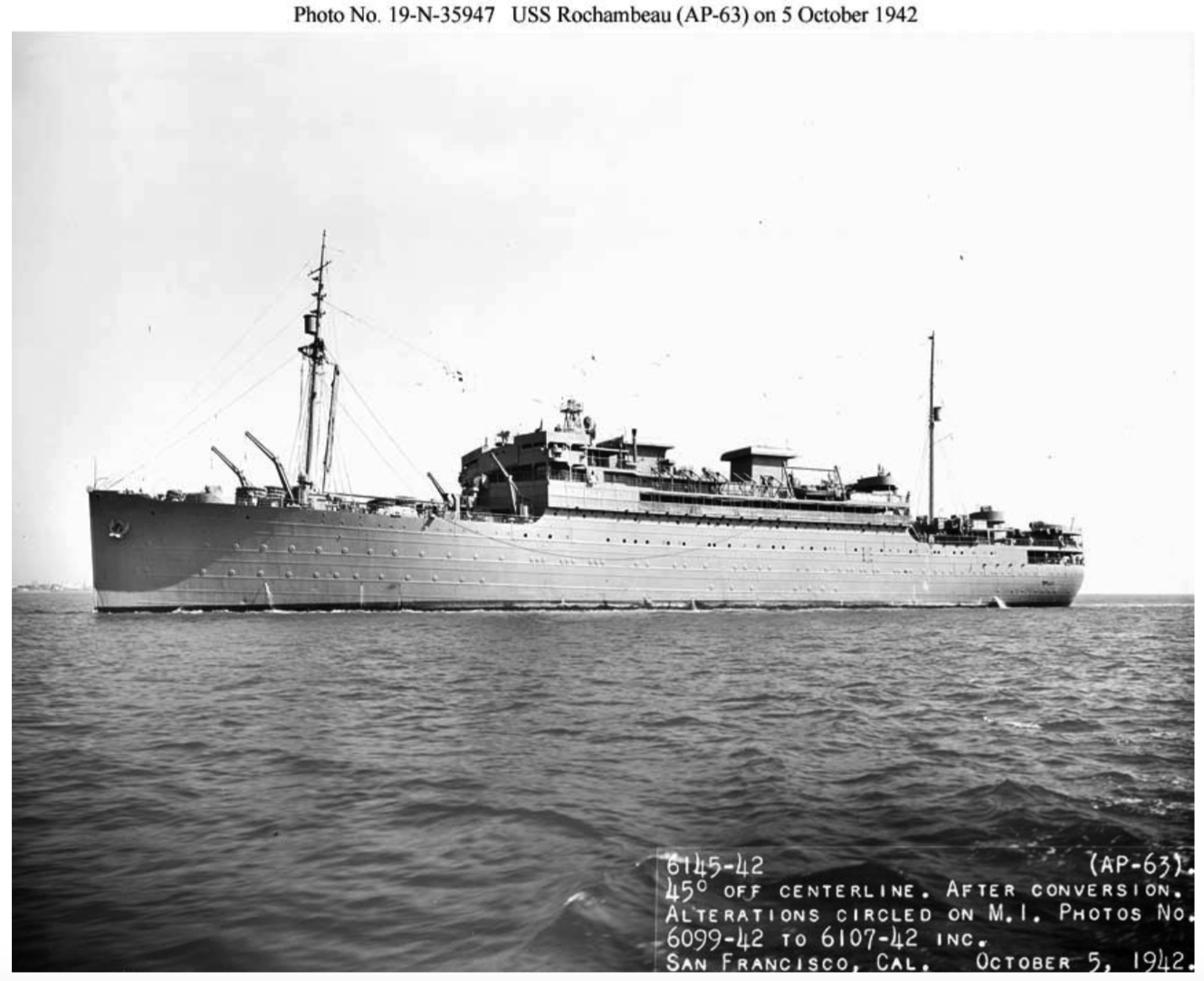
USS Rochambeau – San Francisco, California, October 5, 1942

USS Rochambeau (AP-63) was a transport ship that saw service in the United States Navy during World War II. She was the only U.S. Naval vessel to be named for the French nobleman, Jean-Baptiste Donatien de Vimeur, comte de Rochambeau (1725–1807), who commanded the French troops in Washington's army during the American Revolutionary War.

== History ==
=== French ownership ===
Rochambeau was originally built as Maréchal Joffre in 1931 by the Société Provençale de Constructions Navales of La Ciotat, France for the Société des Services Contractuels des Messageries Maritimes. Manned by Vichy French Forces after the fall of France in 1940, Maréchal Joffre was in the Philippines when the United States entered World War II. She was taken over by a crew of downed US Navy fliers from Patrol Wing 10 and with the help of some of the French sailors who were not supportive of the Vichy government sailed on the 18th for Balikpapan, whence she proceeded to Australia, New Zealand, and the United States. She arrived at San Francisco with a cargo of wool and zircon sand on 19 April 1942.

=== US Navy use ===
The following day, she was taken over by the United States Maritime Commission and transferred to the Navy. Commissioned 27 April 1942, she was renamed Rochambeau and designated AP-63 on the 29th.

Rochambeau, converted for use as a casualty evacuation ship, departed Oakland, California, on 20 October for her first operation under the U.S. flag. With replacements and reinforcements for the Guadalcanal campaign embarked on her westward passage, she made Nouméa; disembarked her passengers; replaced them with casualties from hospitals there, at Suva, and at Bora Bora; and returned to San Francisco on 3 December. At the end of December, she sailed west again. Extending her range to New Zealand and Australia on that voyage, she limited her next run, 9 to 27 March, to New Caledonia and the New Hebrides. On that trip she carried Lieutenant (j.g.) John F. Kennedy to Espiritu Santo where he was transferred to LST-449 and taken to the Solomons. During May, Rochambeau remained in waters off California, then, on 5 June, resumed her passenger/casualty runs to the south and southwest Pacific. Continuing those runs well into 1944, she added ports in New Guinea to her stops in September 1943 and the central Solomons in the spring of 1944. On her last run, 16 November 1944 – 17 January 1945, she brought back casualties from hospitals on Eniwetok, Guam, and Kwajalein in the company of the USS Barrow and USS Boyd.

=== Decommissioning ===
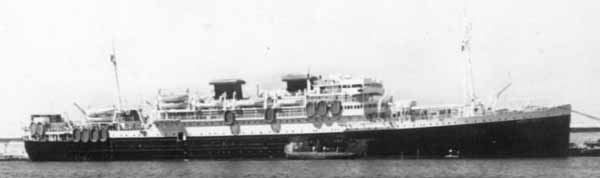
Ex-USS Rochambeau (AP-63) being operated for the WSA by the French Government as Marechal Joffre to transport U.S. troops from Europe to the States after the war; note the extra life rafts along her starboard side

On 9 February, Rochambeau headed for New York City. Arriving on the 25th, she was decommissioned and transferred to the U.S. Maritime Commission's War Shipping Administration (WSA) on 17 March. Her name was struck from the Naval Vessel Register at the end of the month. Then she was returned to her French owners Messageries Maritimes and resumed the name Marechal Joffre and, operating for WSA, was used to transport American troops from Europe to the United States. The hull was repainted black with a white superstructure.

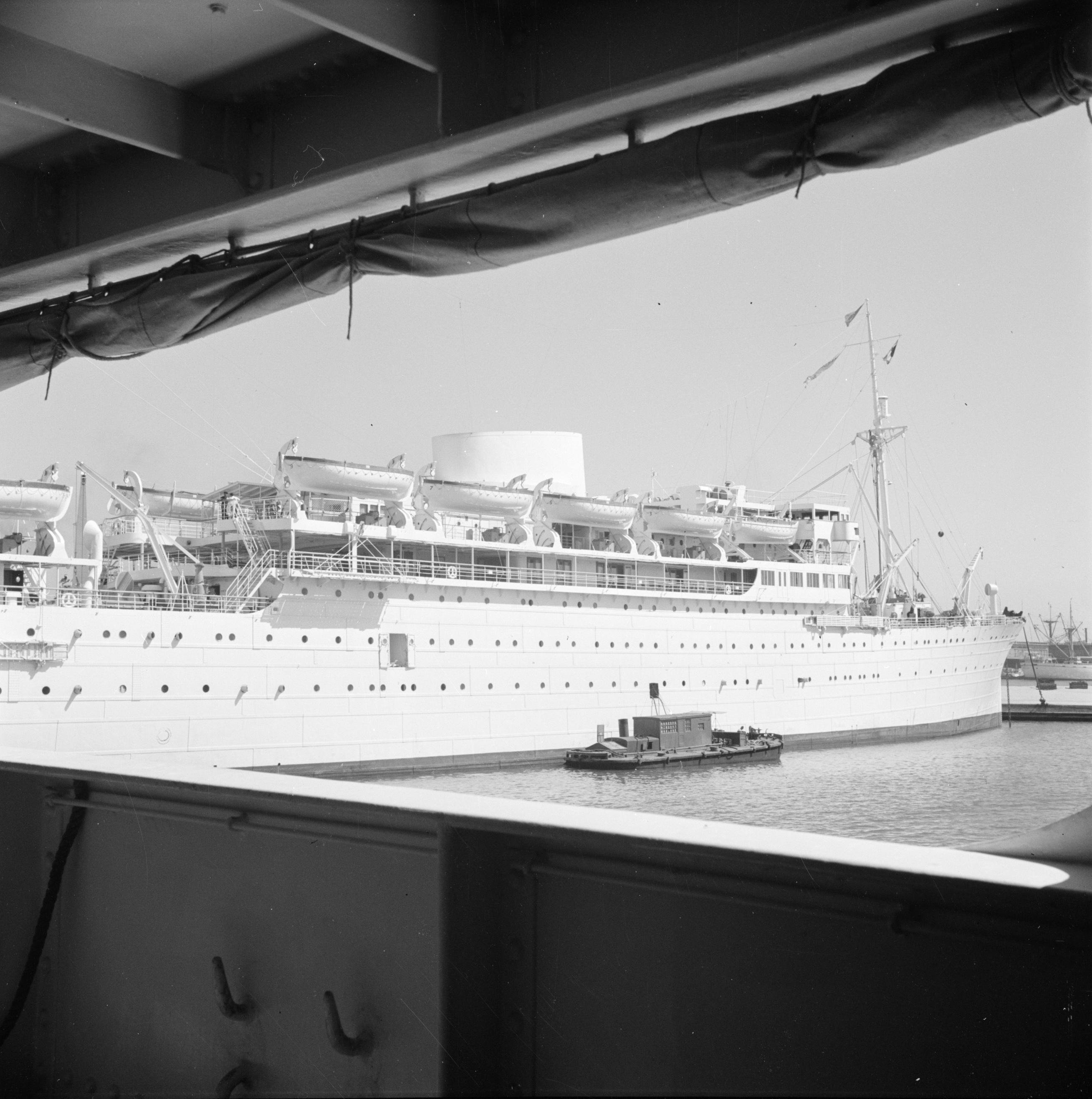
In Alexandria, Egypt, in 1951 with the rebuilt funnel

From 1946 to 1950 she served as a troopship for the French Army in Indochina. Between 1950 and 1951 she returned to La Ciotat for rebuilding and the two funnels were replaced with a single oval funnel and painted white overall. She then served as a liner across the Indian Ocean to the Far East.

She was scrapped in Osaka, Japan, in 1960.
