= USS Bracken =

Gilliam-class vessel

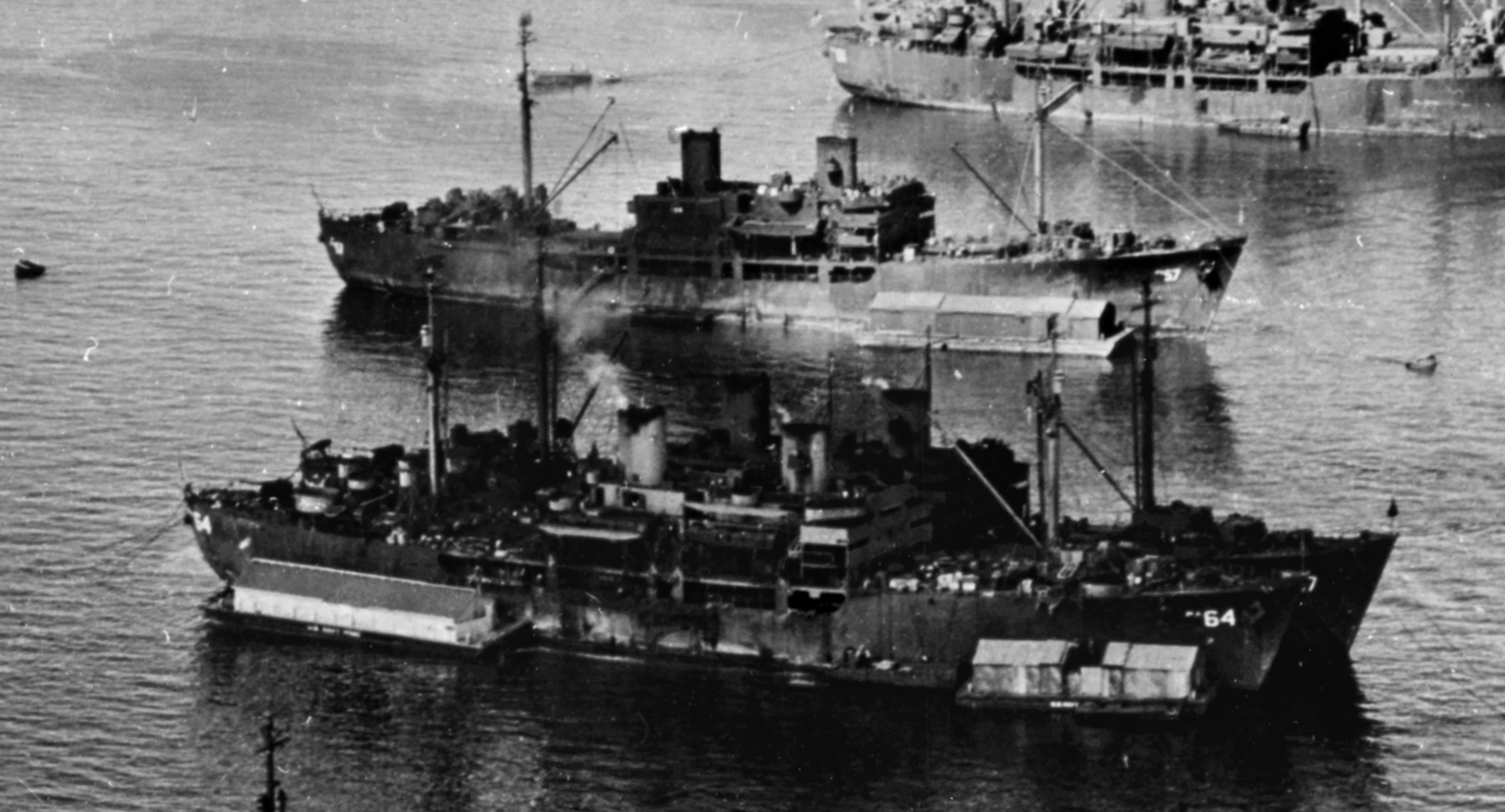
- Bracken at Pearl Harbor, in February 1946

History

United States
- Name: USS Bracken (APA-64)
- Namesake: Bracken County, Kentucky
- Builder: Consolidated Steel
- Laid down: 13 March 1944
- Launched: 10 June 1944
- Sponsored by: Mrs Benjamin M. LeFebre
- Acquired: 3 October 1944
- Commissioned: 4 October 1944
- Decommissioned: 29 August 1946
- Stricken: 5 April 1948
- Fate: Scuttled off Kwajalein 10 March 1948 after use as a target in Operation Crossroads

General characteristics
- Class & type: Gilliam-class attack transport
- Displacement: 4,247 tons (lt), 7,080 t.(fl)
- Length: 426 ft (130 m)
- Beam: 58 ft (18 m)
- Draft: 16 ft (4.9 m)
- Propulsion: Westinghouse turboelectric drive, 2 boilers, 2 propellers, Design shaft horsepower 6,000
- Speed: 16.9 knots
- Capacity: 47 Officers, 802 Enlisted
- Crew: 27 Officers, 295 Enlisted
- Armament: 1 x 5"/38 caliber dual-purpose gun mount, 4 x twin 40mm gun mounts, 10 x single 20mm gun mounts
- Notes: MCV Hull No. 1857, hull type S4-SE2-BD1

USS Bracken (APA-64) was a Gilliam-class attack transport that served with the United States Navy from 1944 to 1946. She was sunk as a target in 1948.

== History ==
Bracken was named after the county in Kentucky. She was launched 10 June 1944 by the Consolidated Steel Corporation at Wilmington, California, under a Maritime Commission contract; acquired from the Maritime Commission 3 October 1944, and commissioned 4 October 1944.

=== World War II ===
Between 28 October 1944 and 31 March 1945 Bracken operated off the coast of southern California as a training ship for the crews of 22 subsequent ships of her class.

During May 1945 Bracken took aboard passengers and cargo and proceeded to Pearl Harbor.

On 3 July 1945, Bracken loaded a full crew of replacement troops and proceeded to sail to the Marshall Islands, the Caroline Islands, and Okinawa.

=== After hostilities ===
Departing Pearl Harbor she called at Midway, Hilo, Eniwetok, Ulithi, Okinawa, Saipan, Leyte, Samar, and Cebu taking aboard occupation troops for transportation to Yokohama, Japan, where she arrived 8 September 1945. Bracken then joined Operation Magic Carpet, which was tasked with transporting returning servicemen from the Far East to the United States.

=== Operation Crossroads ===
Bracken remained on this duty until February 1946, when she commenced preparation as a target ship for Operation Crossroads, the atomic bomb tests at Bikini Atoll. She survived the atomic test and was maintained for radiological and structural studies until 10 March 1948 when she was towed to the open sea off Kwajalein and sunk.
