= USS Fillmore =

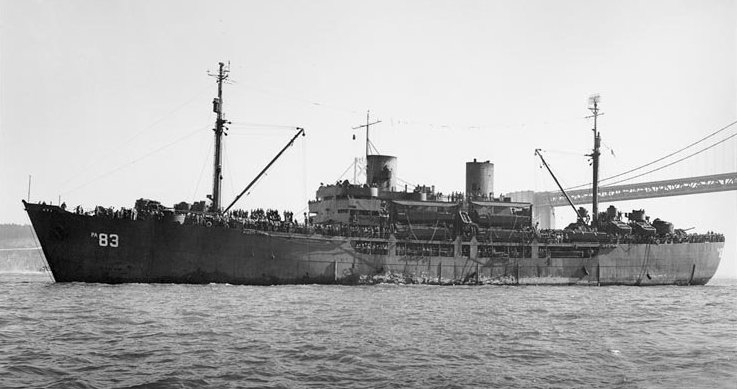
- USS Fillmore (APA-83) underway in San Francisco Bay in late 1945 or early 1946. She is returning troops to the United States as part of Operation Magic Carpet.

History

United States
- Name: USS Fillmore (APA-83)
- Namesake: Fillmore County, Minnesota and Fillmore County, Nebraska
- Builder: Consolidated Steel
- Launched: 4 January 1945
- Sponsored by: Miss Mary L. Rutte
- Acquired: N/A
- Commissioned: 25 February 1945
- Decommissioned: 24 January 1947
- Fate: Sold for scrap, September 1966

General characteristics
- Class & type: Gilliam-class attack transport
- Displacement: 4,247 tons (lt), 7,080 t.(fl)
- Length: 426 ft (130 m)
- Beam: 58 ft (18 m)
- Draft: 16 ft (4.9 m)
- Propulsion: Westinghouse turboelectric drive, 2 boilers, 2 propellers, Design shaft horsepower 6,000
- Speed: 17 knots
- Capacity: 47 Officers, 802 Enlisted
- Crew: 27 Officers, 295 Enlisted
- Armament: 1 x 5"/38 caliber dual-purpose gun mount, 4 x twin 40mm gun mounts, 10 x single 20mm gun mounts
- Notes: MCV Hull No. 1876, hull type S4-SE2-BD1

USS Fillmore (APA-83) was a Gilliam-class attack transport that served with the United States Navy from 1945 to 1947. She was scrapped in 1966.

== History ==
Fillmore was named after counties in Minnesota and Nebraska. She was launched 4 January 1945 by Consolidated Steel at Wilmington, Los Angeles; and commissioned 25 February 1945.

=== World War II ===
Loaded to capacity with cargo and passengers, Fillmore sailed from San Francisco 25 April 1945, bound for Espiritu Santo. Here she landed men and cargo, and loaded aircraft engines, spare parts, and a few passengers for Samar. She departed the Philippines 31 May to embark men and material bound for Pearl Harbor at Biak, Humboldt Bay, and Ulithi, and after exchanging passengers at Pearl Harbor, sailed 29 June for San Francisco.

Outward bound with troops 12 July 1945 Fillmore landed them at Leyte 2 August, and served there as receiving ship until the surrender of Japan.

=== Post-war ===
At once Fillmore began embarking troops and equipment from various points on Samar for the occupation of northern Honshū, landing them at Aomori 25 September. She returned to San Francisco from Japan, Saipan, and Guam 21 October, loaded with veterans eligible for discharge. In November and December, she sailed with occupation troops for Korea.

==== Operation Crossroads ====
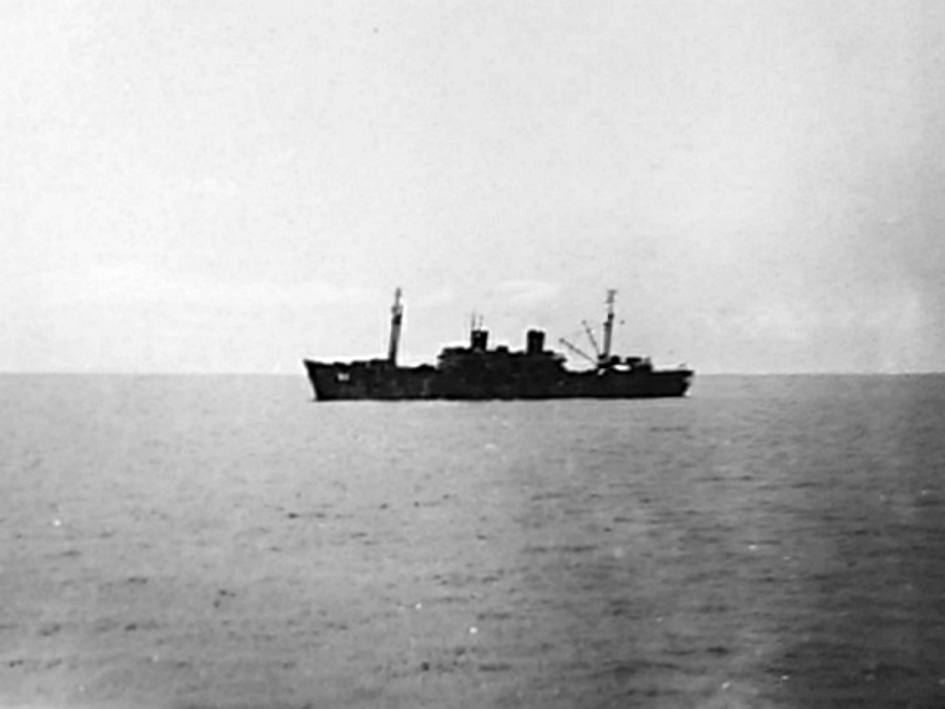
USS Fillmore during Operation Crossroads

Through almost all of 1946, Fillmore was engaged in preparations for, and actual tests in, Operation Crossroads, the atomic bomb tests in the Marshalls.

=== Decommissioning and fate ===
Back in San Francisco 5 November 1946, Fillmore sailed for Norfolk, Virginia, a month later. She was decommissioned 24 January 1947 at Norfolk, and transferred to the Maritime Commission 1 April 1948.
