= USS Burleson =

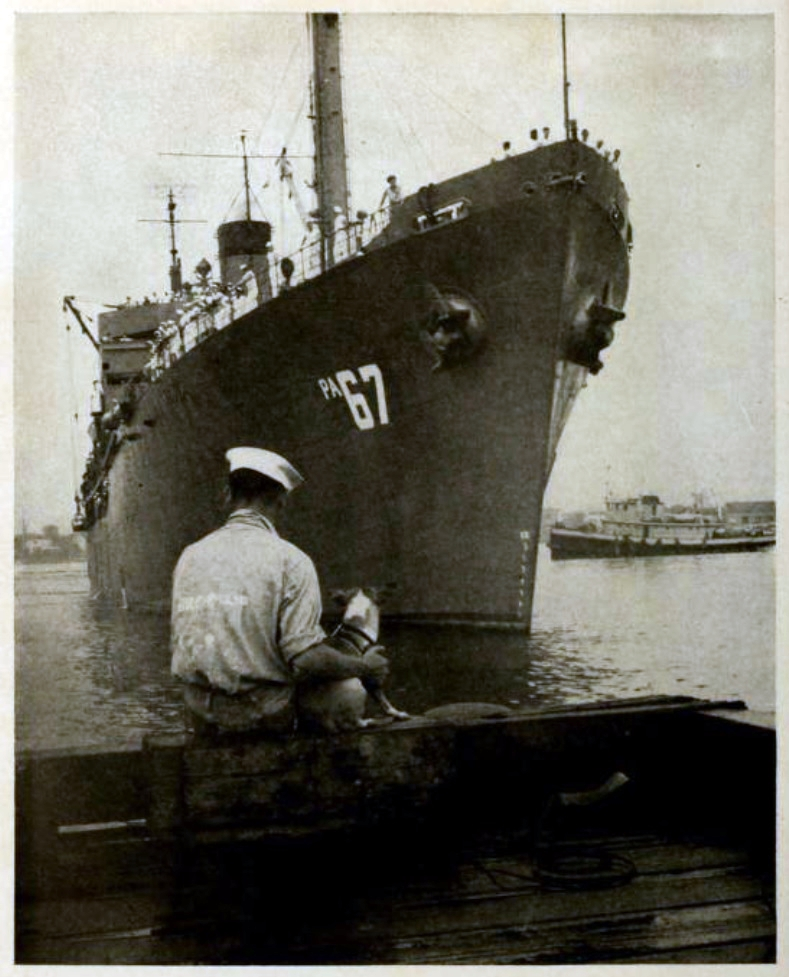
- Burleson arriving from Bikini Atoll upon completion of her deployment in Operation Crossroads

History

United States
- Name: USS Burleson
- Namesake: Burleson County, Texas
- Laid down: 22 April 1944
- Launched: 11 July 1944
- Sponsored by: Virginia Fox
- Commissioned: 8 November 1944
- Decommissioned: 9 November 1946
- Stricken: 1 September 1968
- Fate: Sold in 1968 for scrapping

General characteristics
- Class & type: Gilliam-class attack transport
- Displacement: 7,000 tons
- Length: 426 feet (130 m)
- Beam: 58 feet (18 m)
- Draft: 16 feet (4.9 m)
- Speed: 16.9 knots (31.3 km/h)
- Capacity: 849 troops
- Complement: 220 officers and men
- Armament: one 5-inch 38 caliber gun; eight 40 mm guns

USS Burleson (APA-67) was a Gilliam-class attack transport of the United States Navy. To date, she is the only U.S. Navy ship to be named for Burleson County, Texas.

== History ==
The keel of APA-67 was laid down on 22 April 1944 at Wilmington, California, by the Consolidated Steel Corporation under a Maritime Commission contract (MC hull 1860). She was launched on 11 July 1944 sponsored by Virginia Fox (wife of Darryl F. Zanuck), delivered to the Navy on 7 November 1944, and commissioned on 8 November 1944. The ship was named after a county in east central Texas about 60 miles due east of Austin.

Following shakedown training out of San Diego, California, and post-shakedown repairs at Terminal Island, the attack transport got underway for the southwestern Pacific on 17 January 1945. She stopped at Tillotson Cove in the Russell Islands from 3 to 11 February. On the latter day, she moved over to Guadalcanal. Burleson operated at various locations in the Guadalcanal–Tulagi area conducting amphibious training until mid-March. On 15 March, the ship set a course for Ulithi Atoll. She spent the period 21 to 27 March at anchor in Ulithi lagoon and, on the latter day, got underway in convoy bound for the Ryukyu Islands.

Burleson entered the transport area off Okinawa on the morning of 1 April 1945, the day of the initial assault, but she did not begin unloading until the following day. Those operations continued until 7 April when she put to sea bound for Guam. The attack transport spent the night of 11 April and 12 April at Apra Harbor, Guam, and then resumed her voyage. She arrived in Pearl Harbor on 23 April. Burleson remained in the Hawaiian Islands for two months. She conducted several amphibious training exercises at Maui and underwent repairs at the Pearl Harbor Navy Yard. On 25 June, the ship got underway from Pearl Harbor on her way back to the western Pacific.

After stops at Eniwetok and Ulithi, the attack transport arrived back at Okinawa on 5 August. She unloaded her cargo and disembarked her passengers at Buckner Bay. Burleson stayed at Okinawa beyond the end of hostilities on 15 August and through the end of August. On 5 September, she got underway for the Asian mainland. Burleson arrived at Jinsen, Korea, on 8 September and began disembarking troops assigned to military government units. On 13 September, she returned to Okinawa and operated in the Ryukyu Islands until 26 September. On that day, she departed Okinawa with elements of the First Marine Division embarked. The attack transport reached Taku, China, on 30 September and spent the next five days disembarking troops and unloading cargo.

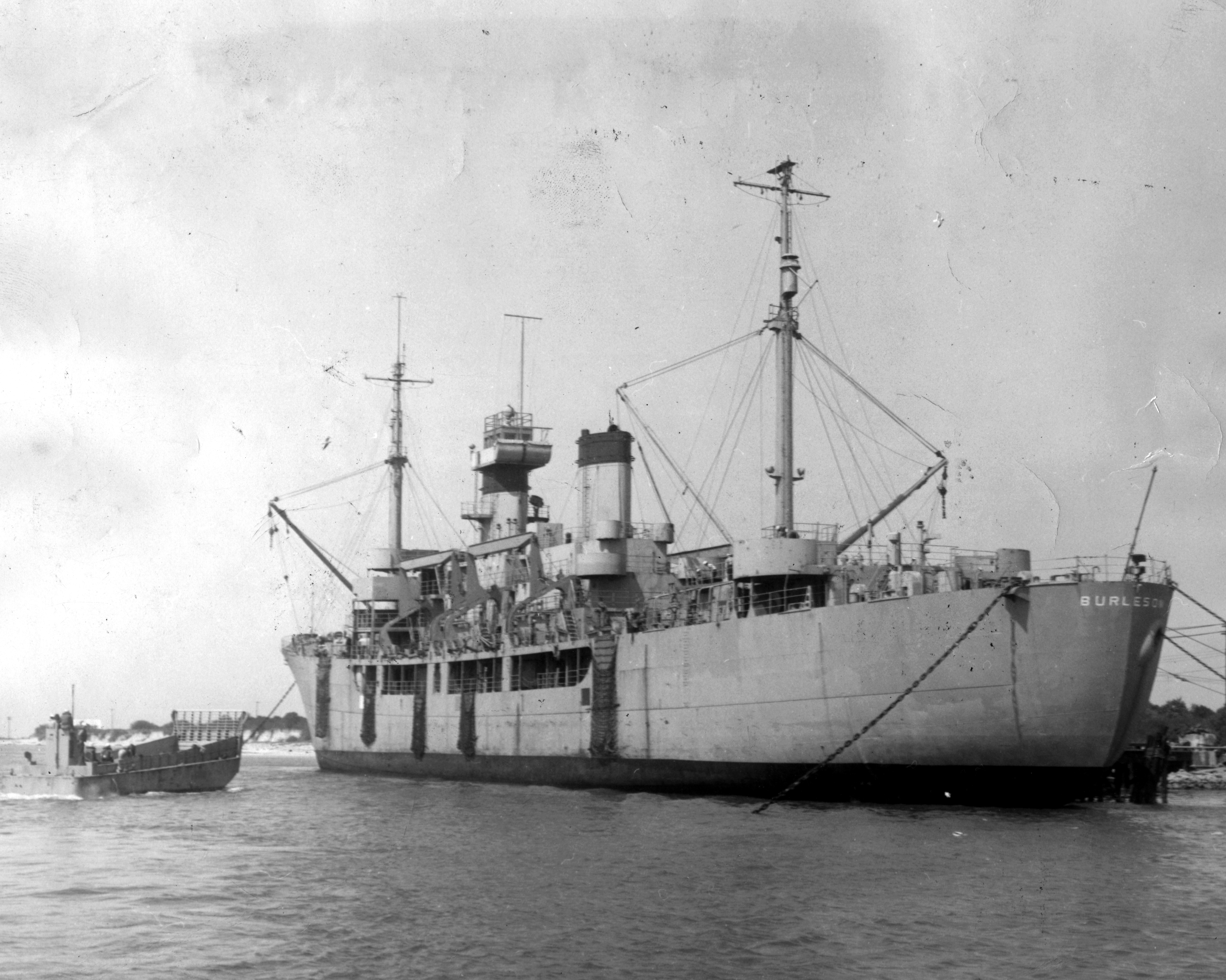
Burleson as a training ship at Little Creek in 1951.

She continued to perform duty in support of occupation forces until November when she returned to Pearl Harbor with a complement of troops returning home. In December, she was assigned to the 14th Naval District temporarily to undergo modifications preparatory to her participation in Operation Crossroads, nuclear tests scheduled for the following summer at Bikini Atoll. In June 1946, Burleson moved from Pearl Harbor to Bikini carrying animals to be used in the two nuclear tests. She observed both tests and moved into the test area after each to remove the animals for study.

At the end of the summer of 1946, Burleson sailed to the East Coast of the United States. She reported for duty at the Naval Amphibious Base, Little Creek, Virginia, where she was decommissioned on 9 November 1946. That event, however, did not end her service. She was retained in an "in reserve, in service" status as a cargo-handling training ship at Little Creek, Virginia. On 5 October 1956 Burleson was redesignated an unclassified miscellaneous vessel IX-67. She continued to serve as a training ship at Little Creek until her name was struck from the Naval Vessel Register on 1 September 1968. On 20 November 1968, she was sold to the North American Smelting Company for scrapping.

Burleson received one battle star for her World War II service.
