= USS Catron =

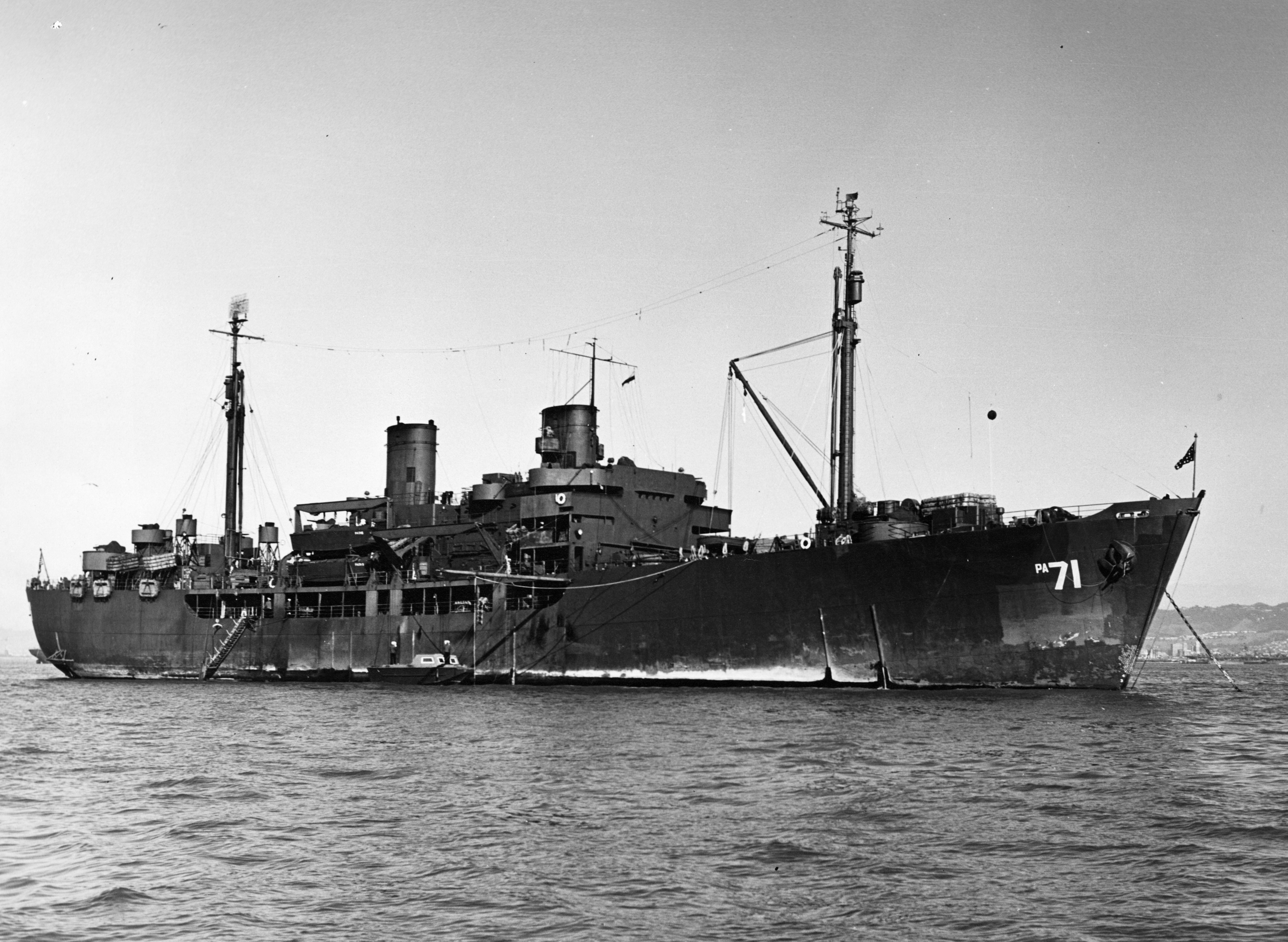
- USS Catron (APA-71)

History

United States
- Name: USS Catron
- Namesake: Catron County, New Mexico
- Builder: Consolidated Steel Corporation, Wilmington, Los Angeles
- Launched: 28 August 1944
- Commissioned: 28 November 1944
- Decommissioned: 29 August 1946
- Honors and awards: 1 battle star (World War II)
- Fate: Sunk as a target, 6 May 1948

General characteristics
- Class & type: Gilliam-class attack transport
- Displacement: 4,247 long tons (4,315 t)
- Length: 426 ft (130 m)
- Beam: 58 ft (18 m)
- Draft: 16 ft (4.9 m)
- Speed: 16.9 knots (31.3 km/h; 19.4 mph)
- Capacity: 2,600 tons cargo
- Troops: 47 officers, 802 enlisted
- Complement: 27 officers, 295 enlisted
- Armament: 1 × 5"/38 caliber gun; 8 × 40 mm guns (4×2); 10 × 20 mm guns (10×1)

USS Catron (APA-71) was a Gilliam-class attack transport serving in the United States Navy from 1944 to 1946. She was sunk as a target in 1948.

== History ==
Catron was named for Catron County, New Mexico and was launched on 28 August 1944 under a Maritime Commission contract by the Consolidated Steel Corporation, Wilmington, Los Angeles; sponsored by Mrs. A. O. Williams of Wilmington; acquired on 27 November 1944; and commissioned on 28 November 1944.

Catron stood out of San Pedro, Los Angeles, on 18 January 1945, bound for training in the Solomon and Florida Islands. She arrived at Purvis Bay on 5 February, and on 21 March reported at Ulithi, Caroline Islands, to combat load for the assault on Okinawa. Carrying men of the 6th Marines and their cargo, she arrived off Okinawa for the initial assault on 1 April. Through the first week of the last large campaign of the Pacific War, Catron remained offshore for the next week, landing cargo to support the Marines in their push across the island.

Leaving Okinawa on 7 April 1945, Catron sailed to San Francisco to load cargo which she delivered to Guam on 13 June. Here she embarked 297 Japanese prisoners of war with whom she arrived at San Francisco on 5 July. After a brief overhaul, she was underway with cargo for Okinawa, where she called from 12 to 24 August.

Her next passage was to the Philippines, where she embarked occupation troops for transportation to Japan, arriving on 25 September. Here Catron took aboard 562 former prisoners of war whom she carried home to San Francisco, arriving on 19 October.

Catron made two more voyages from San Francisco to carry troops to the Philippines between 29 October 1945 and 12 February 1946, when she reported at Pearl Harbor to be stripped in preparation for "Operation Crossroads" the atomic tests at Bikini. Surviving the tests but contaminated by radioactivity, she was decommissioned on 29 August 1946, and remained in the Pacific for radiological and structural study until sunk as a target by Atlanta (CL-104) off Kwajalein on 6 May 1948.

Catron received one battle star for World War II service.
