= USS Fallon =

American attack transport vessel

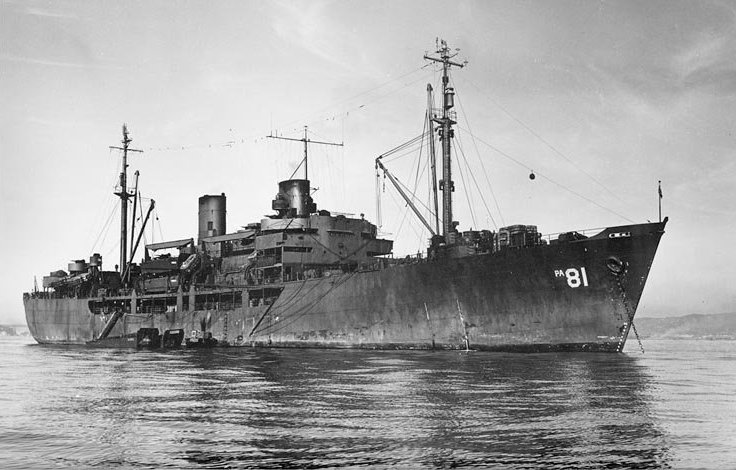
- USS Fallon (APA-81) in San Francisco Bay, late 1945 or early '46

History

United States
- Name: USS Fallon (APA-81)
- Namesake: Fallon County, Montana
- Builder: Consolidated Steel
- Launched: 14 December 1944
- Sponsored by: Mrs. W. H. Guild
- Acquired: 14 February 1945
- Commissioned: 14 February 1945
- Decommissioned: 20 September 1946
- Fate: Scuttled, 11 March 1948

General characteristics
- Class & type: Gilliam-class attack transport
- Displacement: 4,247 tons (lt), 7,080 t.(fl)
- Length: 426 ft (130 m)
- Beam: 58 ft (18 m)
- Draft: 16 ft (4.9 m)
- Propulsion: Westinghouse turboelectric drive, 2 boilers, 2 propellers, Design shaft horsepower 6,000
- Speed: 17 knots
- Capacity: 47 Officers, 802 Enlisted
- Crew: 27 Officers, 295 Enlisted
- Armament: 1 x 5"/38 caliber dual-purpose gun mount, 4 x twin 40mm gun mounts, 10 x single 20mm gun mounts
- Notes: MCV Hull No. ?, hull type S4-SE2-BD1

USS Fallon (APA-81) was a Gilliam-class attack transport that served with the US Navy during World War II. Commissioned late in the war, she was initially assigned to transport duties and consequently did not participate in combat operations.

Fallon was named after a county in Montana. She was launched 14 December 1944 by Consolidated Steel at Wilmington, California, and commissioned 14 February 1945.

== Operational history ==
=== World War II ===
Fallon sailed from San Pedro 12 April 1945 for Pearl Harbor, her base from 21 April to 22 May on two voyages to the Marshalls, Marianas, and Gilberts with garrison troops. She returned to the west coast 28 May, made another voyage to Honolulu and Eniwetok carrying soldiers, and arrived at Pearl Harbor once more 9 August.

==== After hostilities ====
At Pearl, Fallon loaded Marines, whom she landed at Sasebo, Japan, for occupation duty 22 September.

The attack transport carried servicemen eligible for discharge from Okinawa and Sasebo to San Diego between 23 September and 29 October 1945, then made another voyage to the Philippines to return veterans.

=== Operation Crossroads ===
At San Francisco from 5 January 1946 to 16 February, and then at Pearl Harbor, she was prepared for use as a target ship in Operation Crossroads, the atomic weapons tests at Bikini Atoll. She reached the Marshalls 28 May, and after the experiments, was towed to Kwajalein for study.

=== Decommission ===
Decommissioned 20 September 1946, she was sunk off Kwajalein on 11 March 1948.
