= USS Appling =

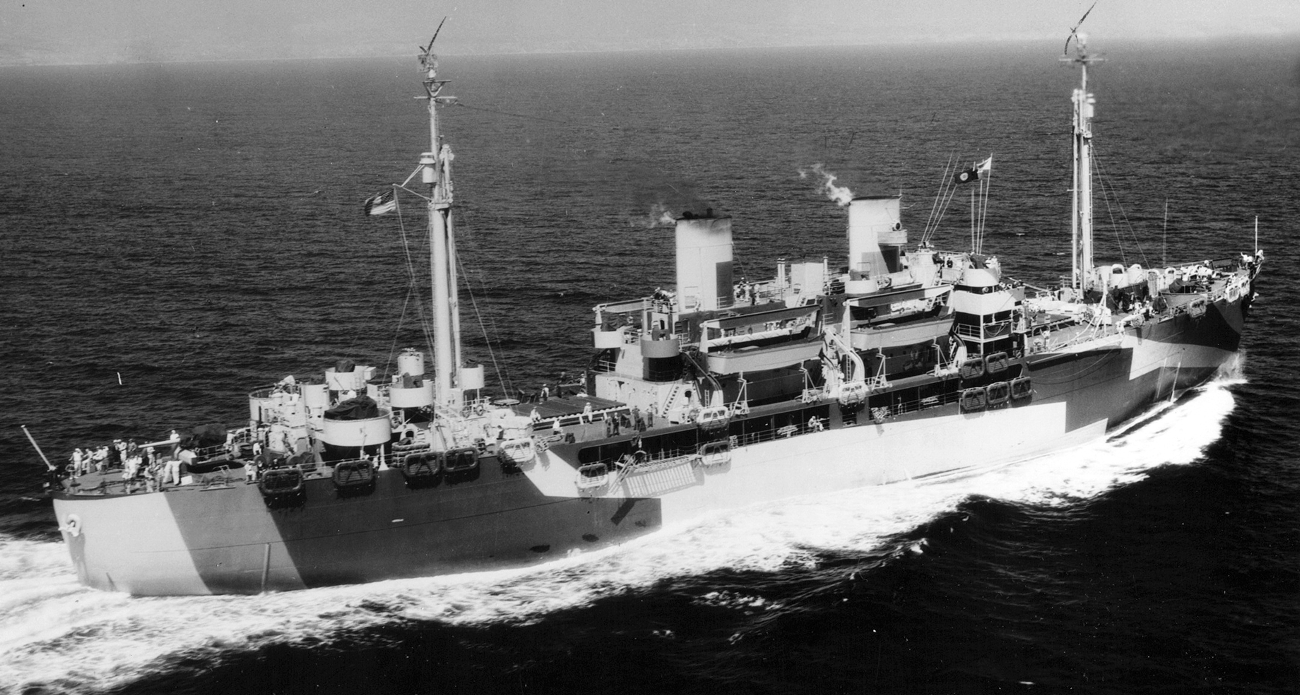
- Appling on 12 August 1944

History

United States
- Name: USS Appling
- Namesake: Appling County, Georgia
- Builder: Consolidated Steel
- Launched: 9 April 1944
- Sponsored by: Claudette Colbert
- Acquired: 22 August 1944
- Commissioned: 22 August 1944
- Decommissioned: 20 December 1946
- Stricken: 4 April 1947
- Honours and awards: Two battle stars for World War II service
- Fate: Scrapped 1969

General characteristics
- Class & type: Gilliam-class attack transport
- Displacement: 4,247 tons (lt), 7,080 t.(fl)
- Length: 426 ft (130 m)
- Beam: 58 ft (18 m)
- Draft: 16 ft (4.9 m)
- Propulsion: Westinghouse turboelectric drive, 2 boilers, 2 propellers, Design shaft horsepower 6,000
- Speed: 16.9 knots
- Capacity: 86 Officers 1,475 Enlisted
- Crew: 47 Officers, 802 Enlisted
- Armament: 1 x 5"/38 caliber dual-purpose gun mount, 4 x twin 40 mm gun mounts, 10 x single 20mm gun mounts
- Notes: MCV Hull No. 1851, hull type S4-SE2-BD1

USS Appling (APA-58) was a Gilliam-class attack transport that served with the United States Navy from 1944 to 1946. She was scrapped in 1969.

== History ==
Appling was laid down under a Maritime Commission contract (MC hull 1851) at Wilmington, Los Angeles, by the Consolidated Steel Corporation; launched on 9 April 1944; sponsored by famed moving picture actress, Claudette Colbert; and simultaneously acquired by the Navy and placed in commission on 22 August 1944.

=== World War II ===
Following shakedown training off the California coast, Appling sailed for Finschhafen, New Guinea, on 17 October. She was forced to stop at Purvis Bay, Florida Island, for engine repairs, but finally reached Finschhafen on 14 November. The ship then carried out training exercises in Humboldt Bay.

==== Invasion of Luzon ====
On 25 December, the ship embarked troops of the 6th Army at Hollandia. Appling sortied for the Philippines on 3 January 1945 with Task Group 77.9, a part of the Luzon invasion force. She anchored in the Lingayen Gulf transport area on 11 January and began discharging troops east of San Fabian. Later that evening, the transport joined other ships in splashing an enemy aircraft 2,000 yards off her starboard quarter. The next day, she retired to Leyte Gulf.

==== Invasion of Okinawa ====
During the next two months, the ship remained in the waters of Leyte Gulf carrying out training exercises. Late in March, she took on cargo and personnel earmarked for Operation "Iceberg," the assault on the Ryukyus. On 27 March, the ship left with Transport Squadron (TransRon) 13 of the Southern Assault Force, bound for Okinawa.

Appling arrived off that island early on 1 April and, at 0605, began lowering her boats, which were used by troops from other vessels. Appling debarked her own troops from 3 to 7 April and then retired to Kerama Retto. She served as a receiving ship there until the 12th, when she returned to Okinawa. On the 14th, the ship got underway for Hawaii.

Following a brief stop at Saipan, Appling reached Pearl Harbor on 2 May and, the next day, sailed for the United States. The ship arrived at San Pedro, Los Angeles, on the 10th, and began voyage repairs. On 7 June, she proceeded to San Diego, California, for refresher training.

The ship set sail on 16 June for Majuro Atoll, Marshall Islands, and continued on to Guam in mid-July. She then reversed her course and returned to the west coast. Appling reached San Francisco on 29 July.

=== After hostilities ===
After almost a month of repairs, during which the hostilities ended, Appling got underway on 28 August and headed via Eniwetok for the Marianas. Following a stop at Guam, she moved to Saipan where she took on elements of the 2nd Marine Division scheduled for occupation duties in Japan.

On 23 September, Appling arrived at Nagasaki in company with other units of TransRon 12. Five days later, the ship sailed to the Philippines and carried troops from Subic Bay and Manila to Sasebo, Japan. Appling left Sasebo on 19 October and set a course back to the United States carrying homecoming veterans.

The transport arrived at Portland, Oregon on 27 November for upkeep. Appling sailed back to the Philippines in early January 1946 to carry more troops home to the United States. The ship left Philippine waters on 4 February and transited to Pearl Harbor.

=== Operation Crossroads ===
Appling was next assigned to the target fleet for Operation Crossroads, tests at Bikini Atoll in the Marshall Islands to determine the effects of atomic bomb explosions upon ships. Appling arrived at Bikini on 2 June and operated in the area of that atoll through 15 August, but was never utilized as a target.

After touching at Pearl Harbor on the 15th, the ship continued on to the west coast for a series of radiological clearance tests held at San Francisco and San Pedro, California. She touched at Port Hueneme, California, on 26 September, to take on cargo for transportation to Pearl Harbor. However, before the ship was loaded, she was ordered to proceed to the east coast for deactivation.

=== Decommission ===
Appling transited the Panama Canal on 22 November and arrived in Norfolk, Virginia, on 30 November. She was decommissioned on 20 December 1946 at the Norfolk Naval Shipyard, Portsmouth, Virginia. Her name was struck from the Navy list on 4 April 1947, and the ship was transferred to the Maritime Commission on 31 March 1948.

The ship was laid up in the National Defense Reserve Fleet until 9 September 1954, when she was consigned to the Arrow Steamship Company. She was returned to the National Defense Reserve Fleet on 12 December 1954 and was berthed in the James River. The ship was scrapped at Philadelphia in 1969.

=== Decorations ===
Appling earned two battle stars for her World War II service.
