= USS Bexar =

Haskell-class attack transport in the US Navy

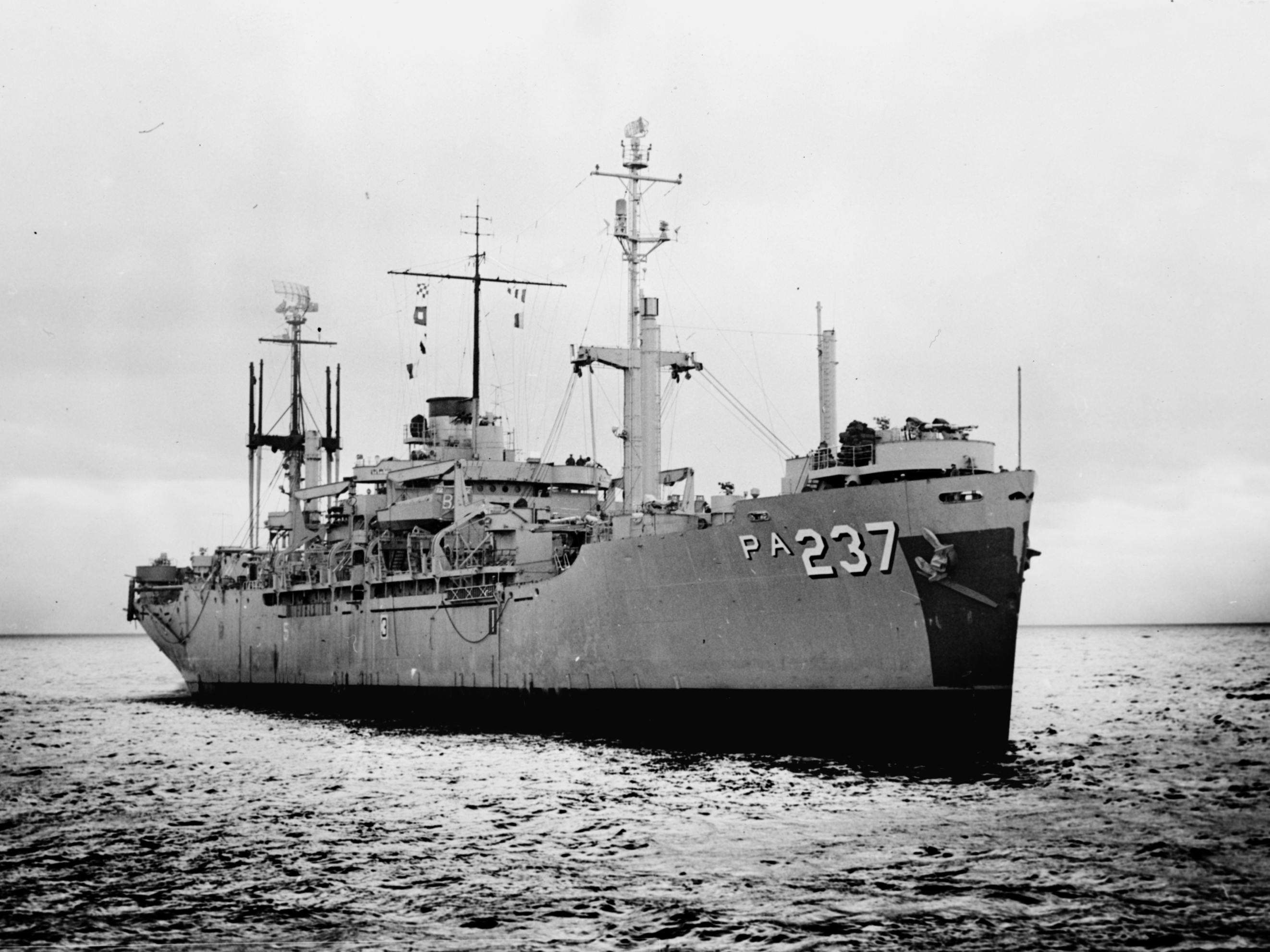
- USS Bexar (APA-237) on 11 January 1957

History

United States
- Name: USS Bexar (APA-237)
- Namesake: Bexar County, Texas
- Builder: Oregon Shipbuilding
- Laid down: 2 June 1945
- Launched: 25 July 1945
- Sponsored by: Mrs A. E. Gunderson
- Acquired: 9 October 1945
- Commissioned: 9 October 1945
- Decommissioned: 7 August 1970
- Reclassified: LPA-237, 1 January 1969
- Stricken: 1 September 1976
- Honours and awards: Three battle stars for the Korean War and five for the Vietnam War
- Fate: Sold for scrap, 16 June 1982

General characteristics
- Class & type: Haskell-class attack transport
- Displacement: 6,720 tons (lt), 14,837 t. (fl)
- Length: 455 ft
- Beam: 62 ft
- Draft: 24 ft
- Propulsion: 1 x Joshua Hendy geared turbine, 2 x Babcock & Wilcox header-type boilers, 1 x propeller, designed shaft horsepower 8,500
- Speed: 18 knots
- Boats & landing craft carried: 2 x LCM, 12 x LCVP, 3 x LCPU
- Capacity: 86 Officers 1,475 Enlisted
- Crew: 56 Officers, 480 enlisted
- Armament: 1 x 5"/38 caliber dual-purpose gun mount, 1 x quad 40mm gun mount, 4 x twin 40mm gun mounts, 10 x single 20mm gun mounts
- Notes: MCV Hull No. 1132, hull type VC2-S-AP5

USS Bexar (APA-237/LPA-237) was a Haskell-class attack transport in service with the United States Navy from 1945 to 1970. She was scrapped in 1982.

== History ==
Bexar was named after Bexar County, Texas. She was launched 25 July 1945 by Oregon Shipbuilding of Portland, Oregon, under a Maritime Commission contract, acquired by the Navy 9 October, and commissioned the same day.

Upon completion of shakedown training, Bexar joined the Operation Magic Carpet fleet. She returned troops from the Pacific until February 1946. After a brief tour of duty around San Diego during the early part of 1946, she was ordered to Pearl Harbor to prepare for Operation Cross-roads.

=== Atomic bomb test ===
In June Bexar proceeded to Bikini Atoll to participate in Operation Crossroads, the large-scale operation designed to test the effectiveness of atomic bombs on warships. Over 200 warships participated in the operation, 75 of them as targets. Bexar served as an equipment supply center.

In August she returned to the West Coast and underwent radioactivity tests.

=== Peacetime missions ===
In January 1947 she joined the Amphibious Force, Atlantic Fleet, based at Norfolk, Virginia. Bexar operated along the Eastern seaboard and in the Caribbean until July 1950, making a Mediterranean cruise (January–February 1948) with Marines embarked.

Between March 1948 and July 1950 she participated in several amphibious exercises and Naval Reserve cruises along the East Coast. In September 1949 she proceeded to the Hawaiian Islands for a large scale amphibious exercise. Returning to Norfolk in December, she resumed her role in the Amphibious Force, Atlantic Fleet.

On 31 July 1950 Bexar departed Norfolk for the Mediterranean. In August she was ordered to embark Marines and proceed via the Suez Canal to Japan.

=== Korean War ===
Upon arrival, she proceeded to Korea where she took part in the Inchon (15 September) and Wonsan (25 October) landings and the evacuation of Chinnampo and Inchon. Departing the Far East on 6 January 1951 she proceeded to San Diego, arriving later in the month.

Between August 1951 and December 1953 Bexar made two more Far Eastern tours in support of Korean operations (August 1951 - May 1952 and July–December 1953). During the latter she served as flagship for Operation Big Switch, the movement of prisoners from Koje Do to Inchon, Korea.

=== Return to peacetime duties ===
Bexar made another tour of the Far East (23 October 1954 – 22 April 1955) during which she participated in the Tachen Islands evacuation.

=== Vietnam War ===
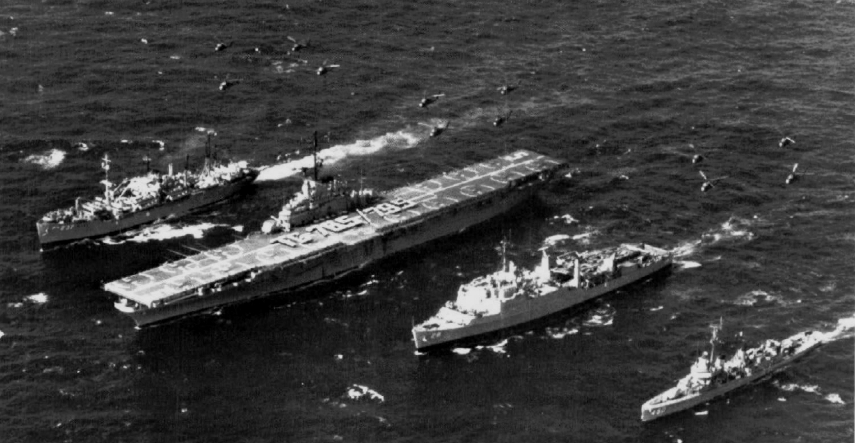
Bexar (left) as part of TG 76.5 off Vietnam in March 1965.

Bexar also saw extensive service in the Vietnam War, from 1965 to 1969. In 1965, she helped land the first US ground troops at Chu Lai.

On 1 January 1969, Bexar along with the other surviving attack transports from World War II were redesignated amphibious transports, Bexar receiving the designation LPA-237.

=== Decommission ===
Bexar was decommissioned on 7 August 1970 and struck from the Naval Vessel Register on 1 September 1976. She was returned to the Maritime Administration on 1 July 1972, and laid up in the National Defense Reserve Fleet at Suisun Bay, California. On 16 June 1982, she was sold for scrapping to C. W. Enterprises & Investment Inc., and scrapped in either South Korea or Taiwan.

=== Decorations ===
Bexar received three battle stars for Korean War service and five campaign stars for Vietnam War service.
