= Gilliam-class attack transport =

US Navy ship

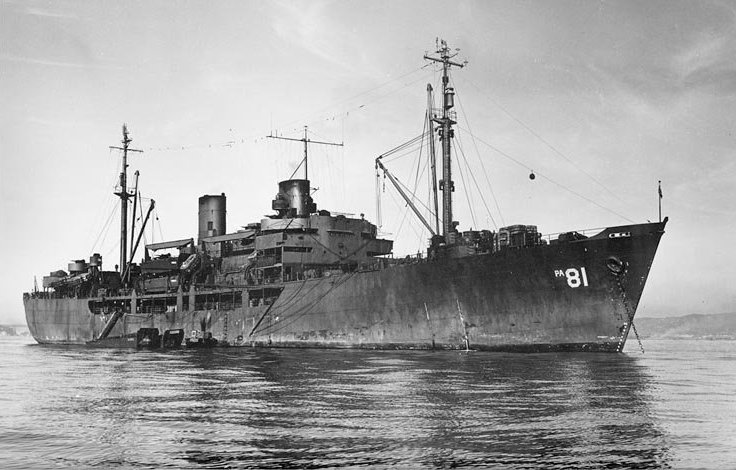
- USS Fallon, one of 32 Gilliam-class attack transports

Class overview
- Name: Gilliam class
- Builders: Consolidated Steel
- Operators: US Navy
- Preceded by: Sumter class
- Succeeded by: Haskell class
- In commission: 1 Aug 1944 – 9 Apr 1945 – 9 Apr 1946 – 23 Jan 1947
- Completed: 32
- Lost: 14 (as target ships)
- Retired: 18

General characteristics
- Class & type: S4-SE2-BD1
- Type: Attack transport
- Displacement: 4,247 tons (lt) 7,080 t.(fl)
- Length: 426 ft (130 m)
- Beam: 58 ft (18 m)
- Draft: 16 ft (4.9 m)
- Propulsion: Westinghouse turbo-electric transmission, 2 boilers, twin propellers, Design shaft horsepower 6,000
- Speed: 17 knots (31 km/h; 20 mph)
- Capacity: 47 Officers, 802 Enlisted, cargo 85,000 cu ft, 600-2,600 tons (Note: One ship, the Appling, is listed as having a cargo capacity of 2,600 tons, the rest with a capacity of 600 tons)
- Complement: 27 Officers 295 Enlisted
- Armament: 1 × 5"/38 caliber dual-purpose gun mount, 4 × twin 40 mm gun mounts, 10 × single 20 mm gun mounts

The Gilliam-class attack transport was a class of attack transport built for service with the US Navy in World War II.

Like all attack transports, the purpose of the Gilliams was to transport troops and equipment to foreign shores in order to execute amphibious invasions using an array of smaller amphibious assault boats carried by the attack transport itself. The Gilliam-class was heavily armed with antiaircraft weaponry to protect itself and its cargo of troops from air attack in the battle zone.

== History ==
The Gilliam-class was designed by San Francisco naval architects Joslyn & Ryan and designated by the Maritime Commission (MARCOM) as type S4-SE2-BD1. The Gilliams were significantly smaller, both in size and displacement, than other classes of attack transports. This was a deliberate Navy design directive, as previous wartime transport losses emphasized the risks of having too many troops and large quantities of cargo in a single hull. In particular, the Navy cited the loss of the George F. Elliott during the Guadalcanal campaign as an example of this. The vulnerability of large transports was later reinforced by the costly loss of five combat loaded AP's during the Invasion of North Africa. There were other advantages to a smaller transport design as well; a reduction in draft allowed for more flexibility in shallow approaches, less time was required for offloading, and having a greater number of small ships distributed troops and materials more evenly across the assault line.

Achieving the design goal of 15 knots speed with no more than 15 feet of draft, with capacity for 600 troops and 60,000 cubic feet of cargo required that the Gilliams be constructed as lightly as possible. Originally the class was to be only 380' in length, but the design had to be enlarged to accommodate a turbo-electric propulsion plant (which was the only machinery readily obtainable by the Maritime Commission at the time). The final design yielded a twin-screw vessel capable of 16.5 knots with a maximum draft of 15.5', an overall length of 426' and a troop-carrying capacity of 800. A distinctive feature of the ships was the sharply raked "Meierform" bow which helped to reduce pitching in heavy seas. The turbo-electric propulsion system was also seen as innovative for a vessel of this type and proved to be reliable in service. Closely related to the original BD1 design were the Type S4 attack cargo ships, the Artemis class, which were designated S4-SE2-BE1. The Haskell class is unrelated and was built on the Victory ship hull.

All 32 vessels of the class were built under a MARCOM contract issued on 25 May 1943 to the Consolidated Steel Corporation of Wilmington, California.

The first of the ships, USS Gilliam (APA-57), rolled off the Wilmington ways on 28 March 1944 and was commissioned on 1 August 1944. The rest rapidly followed, with a new Gilliam-class vessel being launched at an average of roughly one per week until April 1945. The speed of their construction was notable, with Consolidated Steel's contract of 32 vessels being fulfilled three months early. This was all the more impressive considering that this was an all-new design which had never been constructed anywhere previously.

=== World War II service ===
The first of the Gilliam-class ships entered service late in 1944, seeing initial action at either the Battle of Luzon or the Battle of Iwo Jima. Many ships of this class were present at the Invasion of Okinawa, which as it turned out was the only campaign where the later vessels saw combat. Regardless, all of them were engaged in a variety of cargo and transport missions throughout the Pacific during the final year of the war.

=== Postwar missions ===
In the immediate postwar period, the Gilliams, like most other classes of attack transport, were initially utilized to transport US troops for occupation duties - in Japan, China, Korea and other Far Eastern locations formerly occupied by the Imperial Japanese Army - and later as participants in Operation Magic Carpet, the giant sealift organized to bring hundreds of thousands of demobilizing soldiers back to the United States.

=== Operation Crossroads ===
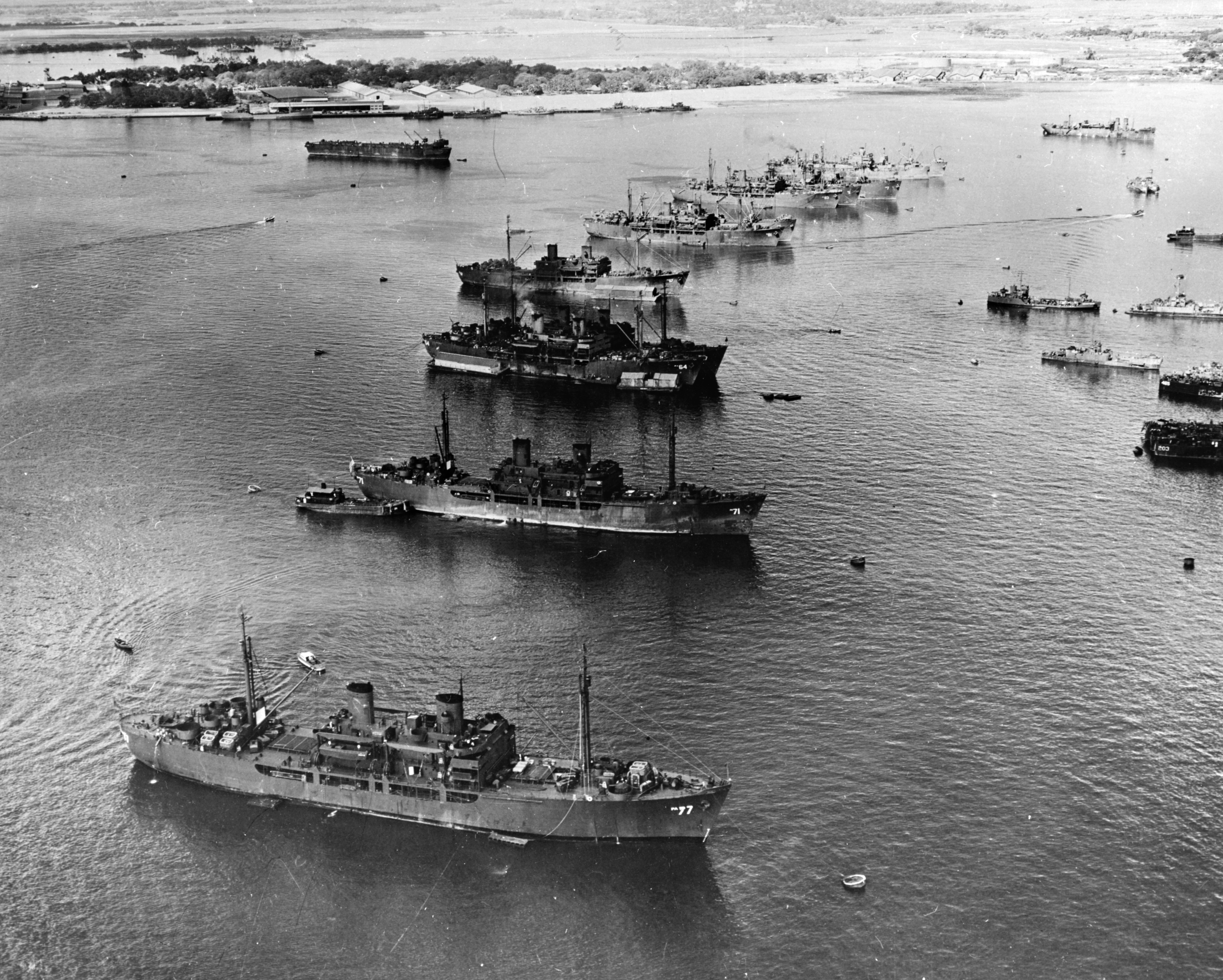
A gaggle of Gilliam-class vessels at Pearl Harbor, awaiting disposal in Operation Crossroads - from front to rear, Crittenden (APA-77), Catron (APA-71), Bracken (APA-64), Burleson (APA-67), Gilliam (APA-57), Fallon (APA-81), one unidentified ship, and Fillmore (APA-83)

At the end of the war, the US Navy found itself with far more ships than it required in peacetime. An assessment of the then unknown effects of atomic weaponry upon a naval fleet was a high postwar priority, resulting in the formation of a Joint Task Force to plan and execute atomic bomb tests at Bikini Atoll in the summer of 1946. Known as Operation Crossroads, these tests were to be conducted on a large array of unmanned target ships to determine the effects of atomic explosions on a variety of vessel types. The Gilliams were identified as being well-suited to the tests, not because of any perceived inferiority or lack of value (they were in fact relatively new, well-constructed vessels) but rather because they were designed with an exclusive wartime function in mind and had little adaptability to other roles. The need for these specialized attack transports had largely evaporated, and because their cargo carrying capacity and endurance was limited the Maritime Commission had no use for them in the peacetime merchant fleet. Consequently, many were allocated to the atomic tests as their type possessed characteristics typical of the naval auxiliary fleet at that time.

All but five of the Gilliam class were sent to Pearl Harbor early in 1946 to prepare for the tests. Of these 27 ships, six were decommissioned before the tests and were not used, two were sunk in Test Able and a further 12 were left in a damaged or radioactive state which necessitated their deliberate sinking months later. The remaining seven ships were located far enough outside the main target arrays to avoid damage, permitting them to be re-manned and remain in service for a time. One - Appling - was selected to become the "detector vessel" for the third test, designated Charlie, which was to be a deep-water test of the same type of bomb used in the Baker test. Test Charlie was cancelled following the unexpectedly high levels of radioactive fallout produced by the Baker blast, but had the test proceeded Appling would have been equipped in the same manner as USS LSM-60 to support and ultimately detonate the bomb. In all likelihood Appling would have been obliterated in the blast, but fate saw that she was returned to the United States and laid up along with the remainder of her sisters who either survived or avoided the tests.

=== Later years ===
Four ships (Clarendon, Crenshaw, Elkhart and Garrard) were selected in September 1945 to be converted to surveying ships (AGS), but these conversions were cancelled prior to the atomic tests the following year. As it was, all remaining Gilliam class vessels were decommissioned by 1947 and saw no further naval (or merchant) service. The sole exception was Burleson, which although decommissioned remained in use with the Navy as a training ship until 1 September 1968. Serious consideration was later given to utilizing the ships as mobile power-generating stations, as their turbo-electric plant was seen as their biggest asset and was capable of generating a significant amount of electricity. The project never came to fruition however and was ultimately abandoned. The remainder of the class was ultimately sold off to scrapping companies in the late 1960s, with Audrain (APA-59) becoming the last surviving example before being scrapped in 1973.

== In fiction ==
The 1956 movie Away All Boats presents operations on an attack transport. It was based on a popular novel of the same name, written by an officer who served on one during World War 2.

== See also ==
- Artemis-class attack cargo ship
- Haskell-class attack transport
