= USS Crawford =

USS Crawford may refer to:

- USS Charles P. Crawford (SP-366), a United States Navy minesweeper and tug in commission from 1917 to 1919

Fictional ships

- USS Crawford (SSN-806), a fictional United States Navy submarine in the NCIS/JAG television universe
