= Naval Base Eniwetok =

Former major US Navy Base in the Marshall Islands

Naval Base Eniwetak
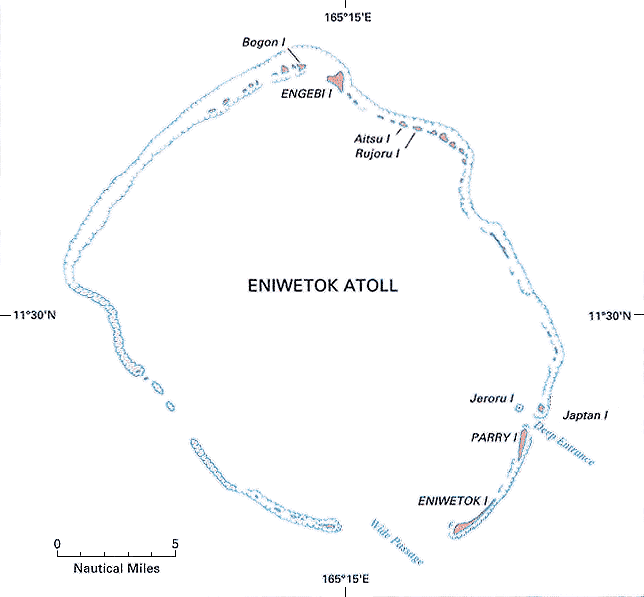
- Eniwetak Atoll; United States Navy; 1944–1948

- Location within Marshall Islands

Geography
- Location: North Pacific
- Coordinates: 11°30′N 162°20′E
- Archipelago: Ralik
- Total islands: 40
- Area: 5.85 km^{2} (2.26 sq mi)

Marshall Islands on the globe in the Pacific Ocean

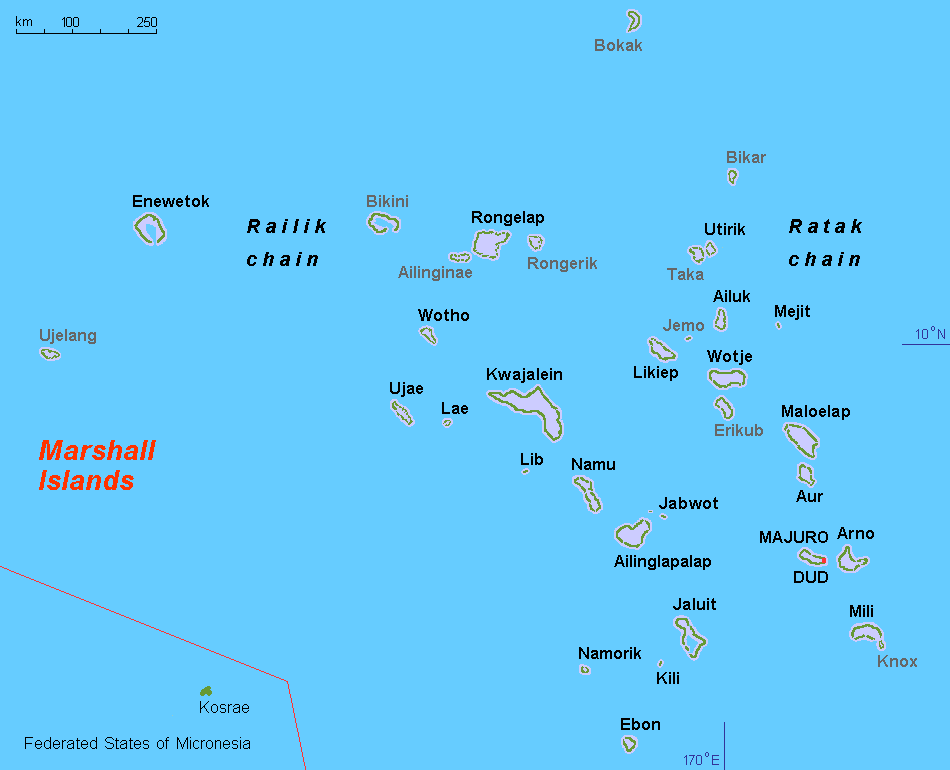
Marshall Islands map

Naval Base Eniwetok HQ 1945

Naval Base Eniwetok was a major United States Navy base located at Enewetak Atoll in the Marshall Islands, during World War II. The base was built to support the island-hopping strategy used by allied nations fighting the Empire of Japan in the Pacific War. During 1944–1945 Eniwetok was one of the busiest naval bases in the world with over 488 ships.

== History ==
Enewetak (also spelled Eniwetok) Atoll is a large coral atoll with a lagoon circled by 40 islands in a 50-mile (80 km) circumference. The islands have less than 2.26 square miles (5.9 km^{2}) of land that is only a few feet above sea level. The deep lagoon in the atoll offers excellent fleet anchorage for the largest ships. The lagoon has only three entrances, providing control and protection. After World War I, Eniwetok became part of Japan under the South Seas Mandate. In November 1942, the Empire of Japan built an airfield on Enewetak Atoll's Engebi Island, to refuel and support planes at Truk. In the United States' Marshall Islands campaign, the US took control of the Marshall Islands and the Imperial Japanese Army sent the 1st Amphibious Brigade with 2,586 men to defend the base on Engebi Island and Parry Island. In the Battle of Eniwetok, the US took Eniwetok, starting on 17 February 1944, and ending 23 February. The action took place on three islands: Engebi, Parry, and Eniwetok by the US 22nd Marines and the Army's 106th Infantry. Medical dispensaries were built on each of the main islands: Eniwetok, Engebi, and Parry islands, with a total of 200 beds.

== Engebi Airfield ==
On Engebi Island was a runway built by Japan. The US Army 47th Engineers repaired and improved the runway starting February 1944 and completing 10 March. The Engebi Airfield was named Wrigley Airfield. Four fighter squadrons used the 3,950-foot by 225-foot runway. At the airbase were an engine-overhaul shop and a 146,000 gallons aviation-gasoline tank farm. The Army had the 41st Bomber Group and 396th Bomber Squadron flying B-25. Marine Aircraft Group 31 and VMF-113 also used the Engebi Airfield, flying Vought F4U Corsair. In September 1944 Charles Lindbergh visited Engebi Airfield and United States Marine Corps flew the Corsairs. Charles Lindbergh helped improve the maximum ordnance load of the Corsairs. By June 1944, the major projects on Engebi had been completed and Construction Battalion Maintenance Unit 594, CBMU 594, took over. Engebi Island was given the code name Janet and is at 11.662887°N 162.240124°E. The airfield was abandoned at the end the war.

== Eniwetok Island ==
US Navy Seabees with the 110th Naval Construction Battalion arrived at Eniwetok starting 21 February 1944. The Seabee's first task was clearing the runway of battle damage and repairing the runway to be a bomber airbase for the United States Army Air Forces. The completed runway, Stickell Field, was 6,800-by-400-foot (2,070 by 120 m) wide on Eniwetok Island. The first plane landed on 11 March, and the first attack mission was carried out on 5 April. Seabees built air facilities that included a major engine overhaul depot, and barracks for Army aviation personnel with quonset huts. The most common bombers were Consolidated B-24 Liberator and North American B-25 Mitchell.

The US Navy also used Stickell Field, with unit VD-3 flying PB4Y, Navy Liberator. The Navy had stationed at base unit VB-109, VD-4, and VPB-109 flying Lockheed Ventura Harpoon-PV-1 and Consolidated PB4Y-2 Privateer. Stickell Field is named after Lt. John H. Stickell, a US Navy and former RAF pilot. John H. Stickell was killed in 1944 in action against the Jaluit Atoll.

Seabees built a large tank farm with twelve 1,000-barrel tanks to fuel the bombers with aviation gasoline at Stickell Field. Tankers in the lagoon could refill the tanks by a floating pipeline that was 1,200 feet long at a tanker mooring. The tank farm was completed by May 1944. It was partly damaged when a Landing craft tank, LCT(5)-315, had an explosion on 23 March 1944.

Seabees also built two (80-foot and 150-foot) coral-fill piers out into the lagoon on Eniwetok Island for unloading supplies. They also built tow beach ramps for unloading LCTs. In addition, Seabees built two berths that were used for ships to dock and do anti-aircraft target practice. For target practice, the airbase would provide a towed target and also had drone planes tow targets for safety.

3,500 troops were stationed on Eniwetok Island in 1944. Naval Base Eniwetok Fleet Post Office Box's number was 3237. Eniwetok Island was given the code name Fred at 11.339243°N 162.322457°E. After the war, the runway became Enewetak Auxiliary Airfield, now an emergency landing runway. Hal Kanter built and ran Armed Forces Radio Service radio station on Naval Base Eniwetok.

=== Bob Hope ===
In 1944 Bob Hope put on a Bob Hope Show on Eniwetok Island. In the USO military tour there were still wrecked planes and equipment in the background. Hope had Jerry Colonna and Frances Langford sing on stage. Patty Thomas danced and musician guitarist Tony Romano played. Hope called his 1944 tour of the South Pacific: "Loew’s Malaria Circuit" and "the Pineapple Circuit". Hope did 150 shows in the two months they were on the 1944 road trip. Hope's 1944 show visited Naval Base Pearl Harbor Hawaii at the Nimitz Bowl, Eniwetok, Naval Base Cairns, Green Islands, Bougainville, Milner Bay, Naval Base Treasury Islands, Naval Base Mios Woendi called Wendy Island, and Naval Base Kwajalein.

== Parry Island ==
Troops at sea on ships and boats need R&R, so in June 1945, the 67th Naval Construction Battalion arrived and built a 35,000-man recreation center on Parry Island. Parry Island had mark off swimming beaches. At the recreation center in the atoll, the Navy had an ice cream barge that could make up to 500 gallons of ice cream for the troops in 8 hours. The ice cream barge also would make fresh bread products. The base officer's club was built on Parry Island. The base printed a bulletin newspaper to keep the Troops up-to-date at the base. After completion, the Construction Battalion Maintenance Unit 608 (CBMU 608) took over the day-to-day operation and Maintenance of the center. Naval Base Eniwetok was part of the vast Naval Base Marshall Islands. On Parry Island the 110th Battalion Seabees repaired and improved the Parry Island Seaplane Base captured from Japanese forces. Parry Island is also known as: Medren, Elmer, Igem, Heartstrings, and Overbuilt at 11.401322°N 162.370072°E.

== Smaller Islands ==
The local inhabitants, Micronesians, at Eniwetok were restricted to the smaller islands of Biijiri, Aomen, and the Rojoa complex. Aomen (Aranit, Ulie) codename was Sally. Biijiri, Bijire codename was Tilda. One of the small islands, that was away from the base and inhabitants, for safety, was used as an ammunition depot. Seabees of the 126th Battalion built a second fleet recreation center on Runit Island, codename Hawthorne, six weeks later it was crated up and shipped to Naval Base Ulithi. The 126th Battalion also built facilities on Japtan, codename, David.

== Eniwetok lagoon ==
The deep lagoon the Navy set up fleet anchorage and a major US Naval Advance Base. The USS Cascade (AD-16) became the flagship of Service Squadron 4 and Service Squadron 10. A Service Squadron is a floating Naval Base, with all the support a land base would give. In the Service Squadron were all the supplies and repair depot support the fleet needed. The Service Squadron had: Fleet Oilers (AO), Gasoline Tanker (AOG), Repair Ships (AR), Ammunition ships (AE), Destroyer Tenders (AD), Tugboats, Barges, Seaplane tenders,hospital ship (AH), Net laying ships (AN), barracks ships (APL), Small Auxiliary Floating Dry Docks, stores ship, and Submarine tenders (AS). By July 1944 there were about 488 at the base, after a fleet depart there were 283 ships. Seabes built a signal tower at the entrance to the lagoon, that became the Harbor Entrance Control Post (HECP), to direct port traffic. The USS Vega (AK-17) was used to assemble floating pontoon barges. Shipping Pontoons flat and unassembled took a lot less space. Outboard engines were added to many barges for moving supplies in the atoll.

As the fighting front moved east and closer to Japan, Service Squadron 10 was too far away from the action. Service Squadron 10 started departing Enewetak Atoll on 4 October 1944 for Naval Base Ulithi arriving on the 15th. Ulithi is 1,538 miles west of Eniwetok. Squadron 10 was moved to Ulithi in four convoys, tugboats returning to move non-self-propelled craft for each trips. Non-self-propelled craft included: APL-14 troopship, 7 concrete 3,000-ton storage barges, 19 oil/water barges, 17 gasoline barges, 24 500-ton barges with ammunition, freight, spare parts, radio, medical, mail, refrigerated food, etc. The Service Squadron 10 move took 2 weeks.

=== Eniwetok repair depot ===
The US Navy set up a large ship and boat repair depot at Naval Base Eniwetok. The repair depot provided the fleet with support to keep ships and subs tactically available in the Pacific War with the repair and supply depot, rather than ships having to return to continental United States. The Navy had built special auxiliary floating drydocks that were able to repair battle damage to even the largest ships and do regular maintenance in the field saving ships trans-pacific travel time for repair. Supply store ships were also at the base with the parts needed to keep the fleet ready. The USS Endymion (ARL-9) was torpedoed and had temporary repairs made at Eniwetok. In September 1944 a strong westerly storm hit Eniwetok, damaging many boats and barges and driving high-speed target rafts ashore. The depot worked overtime to repair the damage.

- Some of the Eniwetok repair depot ships and crafts:
- USS Richland (YFD-64), Auxiliary floating drydock
- USS Oak Ridge (ARDM-1), Auxiliary floating drydock
- USS Endurance (ARDM-3), Auxiliary floating drydock
- AFDL-32, a type of Small Auxiliary Floating Dry Docks
- USS ARD-13, ARD Auxiliary floating drydock, mostly destroyer repair
- USS ARD-15, ARD Auxiliary floating drydock, mostly destroyer repair
- USS ARD-23, ARD Auxiliary floating drydock, mostly destroyer repair
- USS Jason (AR-8), large repair ship
- USS Ajax, large repair ship
- USS Nestor (ARB-6), repair ship and small craft tender
- USS Oceanus (ARB-2), battle damage repair ship
- USS Preserver (ARS-8), repair ship
- USS Zeus (ARB-4), repair ship
- USS Vestal, large repair ship
- USS Mona Island (ARG-9), repair ship
- USS Deliver (ARS-23), rescue and salvage ship
- USS Shackle (ARS-9), rescue and salvage ship
- USS Supply (IX-147), aircraft stores ship
- YRB-34, Floating Workshop

=== Eniwetok seaplane base ===
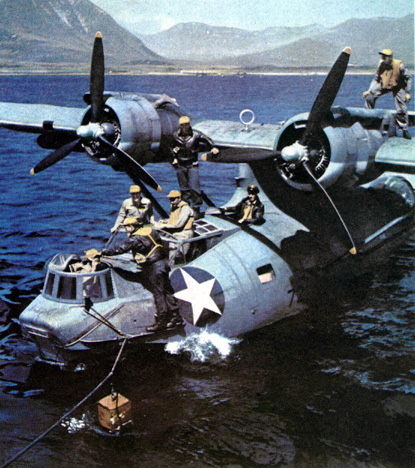
A Consolidated PBY Catalina seaplane crew

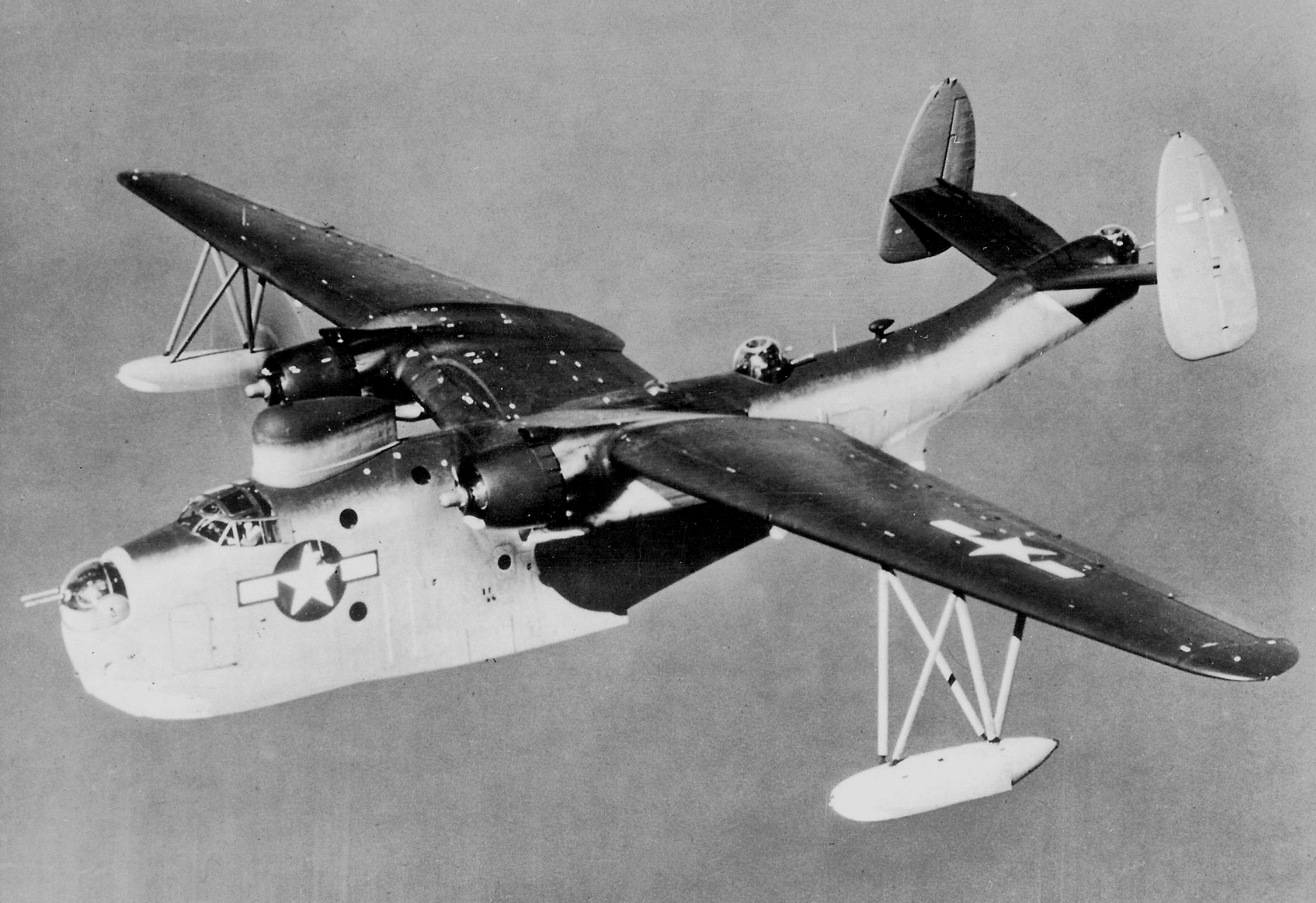
Martin PBM-5 Mariner seaplane in flight

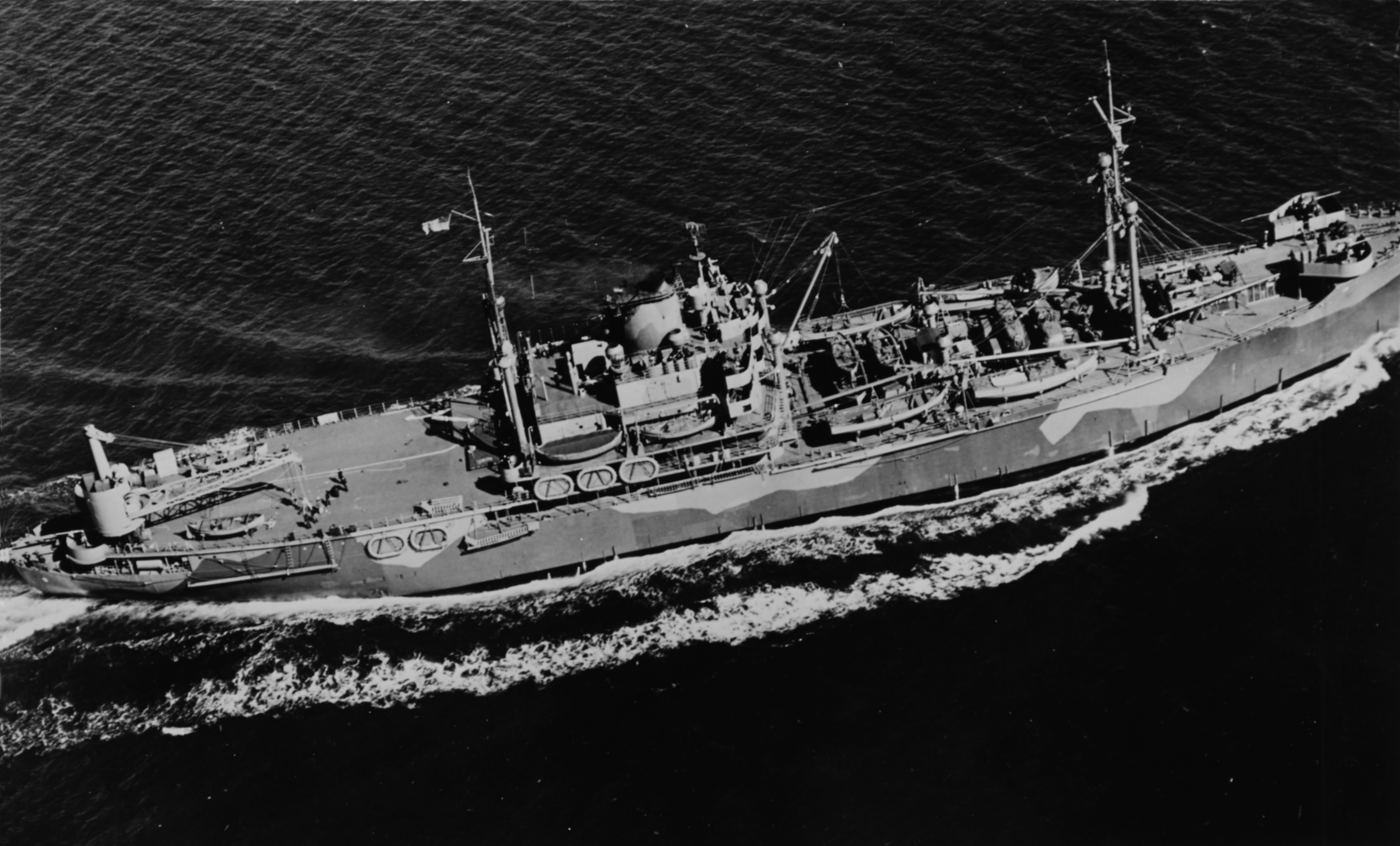
USS Pocomoke (AV-9) a seaplane tender, the crane at the rear of the ship is used to bring a seaplane on to the deck for repair and serving. The remaining parts of the ship are for the ship's and seaplane crew, also the ship's and seaplane fuel. The ship's stores would have crew's food and spare parts for seaplanes.

The Parry Island seaplane base had only one seaplane ramp and it was not usable at low tide. Most of the seaplane base operations were carried out by seaplane tenders in the lagoon. Seaplanes did reconnaissance patrols and search, also rescue missions for downed aircrew men and survivors of sunk ships. The most common seaplanes at the base were Consolidated PBY Catalina and Martin PBM Mariner. The seaplane base take off and landing was a spot was marked off in the atoll. The seaplanes were supported by a floating base of seaplane tenders. Seaplane tenders had stores to supply: food, fuel, ammo, spare parts. The seaplane tender also had housing and mess halls for the aircrew while the seaplane was being serviced. Aircrew on leave could go to Eniwetok's fleet recreation center. Some seaplane tenders were stationed at Eniwetok seaplane base for months. Other seaplane tenders came to Naval Base Eniwetok to resupply the ship's stores before returning to a US Naval Advance Base. Some came to Eniwetok repair depot to be repaired. Unit base at Eniwetok seaplane base VP-13, VP-16, VP-21, VP-23, VP-MS-6, VP-102, VP-202 VPB-19, and VPB-22. Some seaplane tenders at Naval Base Eniwetok:

- USS Corson (AVP-37)
- USS Hamlin (AV-15)
- USS Casco (AVP-12)
- USS Suisun
- USS Chandeleur (AV-10)
- USS Mackinac (AVP-13)
- USS Barataria (AVP-33)
- USS Chincoteague (AVP-24)
- USS Kenneth Whiting (AV-14)
- USS Onslow (AVP-48)
- USS Pocomoke (AV-9)
- USS St. George (AV-16)
- USS Duxbury Bay (AVP-38)
- USS San Pablo (AVP-30)
- USS Yakutat (AVP-32)
- USS Cumberland Sound (AV-17)
- USS Shelikof (AVP-52)
- USS Coos Bay
- YSD-42 Seaplane Wrecking Derrick

=== Stationed at Eniwetok ===
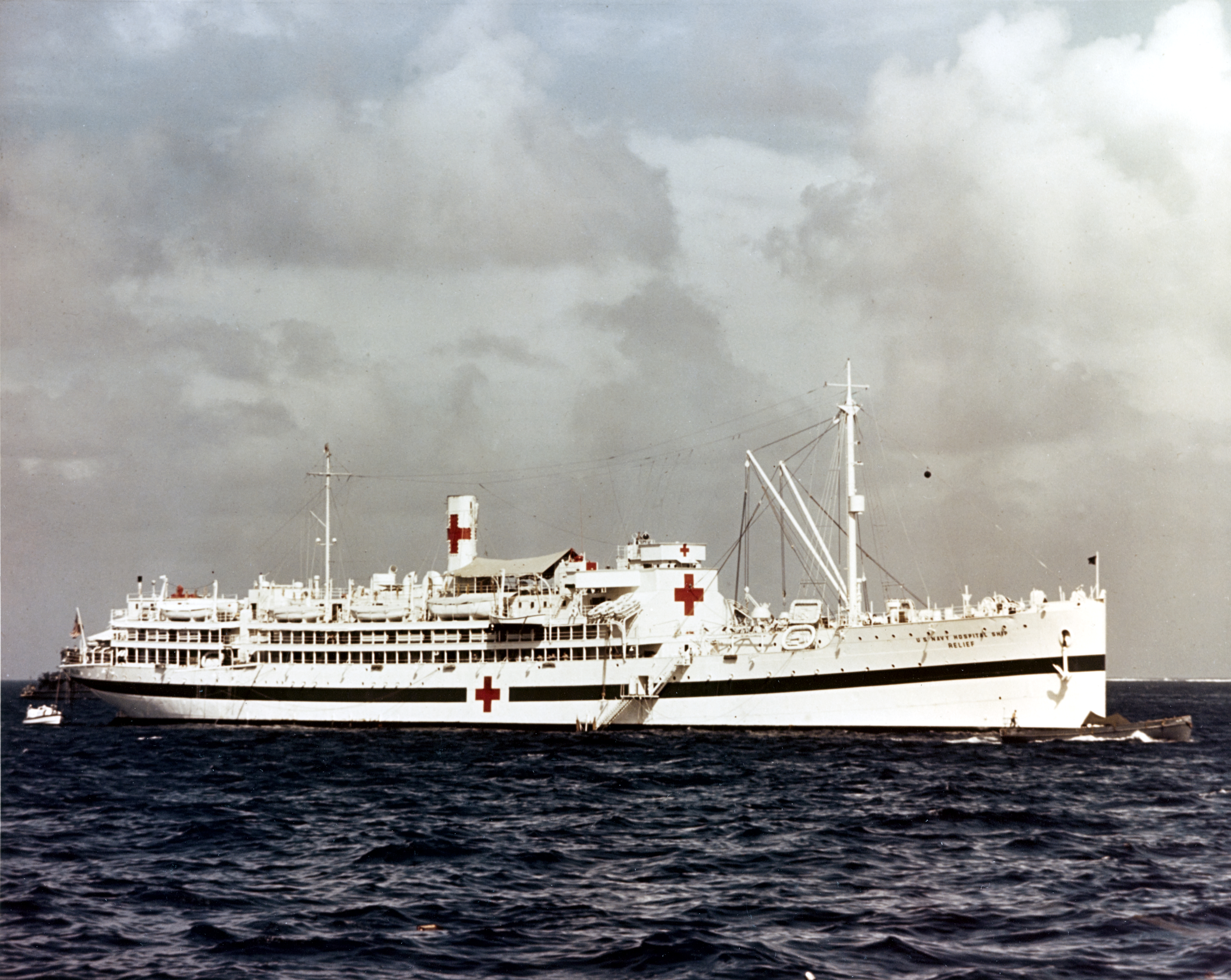
USS Relief (AH-1) hospital ship in 1945

- Over 6,000 seamen were at Eniwetok, stationed in ships and on shore bases. Hundreds of ships at anchored at Eniwetok, some stationed, some in for repair or resupply. United States Merchant Navy ships would unload supply at Naval Base Eniwetok to keep the fleet and base supplied.
- Service Squadron 10, a floating 400 ship base with tankers, Fleet oilers, refrigerator ships, ammunition ships, supply ships, floating docks and repair ships. Service Squadron 10 started departing Enewetak Atoll 4 October 1944 for Naval Base Ulithi arriving on the 15th.
- USS Abatan, distilling ship freshwater from the sea for land base and small vessels.
- USS Dauphin (APA-97), floating barracks, troopship
- APL-14, floating barracks
- USS Amador, ammunition tender
- USS Firedrake (AE-14), ammunition tender
- USS Lassen (AE-3), ammunition tender stores
- SS Plymouth Victory, ammunition stores
- USS Turkey (AM-13), minesweeper
- USS Sabine (AO-25), carrier oiler
- USS Aucilla, carrier oiler
- USS Marias (AO-57), battleship oiler
- USS Platte (AO-24), battleship oiler
- USS Taluga (AO-62), cruisers oiler
- USS Sepulga (AO-20), cruisers oiler
- USS Cowanesque (AO-79), destroyer oiler
- USS Chotauk (IX-188), destroyer oiler
- USS Elk (IX-115), destroyer oiler
- USS Malvern (IX-138), destroyer oiler
- USS Genesee (AOG-8), oiler
- USS Enoree (AO-69), oiler
- USS Nantahala (AO-60), oiler
- USS Tombigbee (AOG-11), oiler
- USS Saranac (AO-74), oiler
- USS Neosho (AO-48), oiler
- USS Caliente (AO-53), oiler
- USS Pecos (AO-65), oiler
- USS Cimarron (AO-22), oiler
- USS Standard Arrow (ID-1532), oiler
- USS Wabash (AOG-4), oiler
- USS Arethusa (IX-135), oiler
- USS Inca (IX-229), oiler
- USS Neches (AO-47), oiler
- USS Lackawanna (AO-40), oiler
- USS Gazelle (IX-116), oiler
- USS Kaskaskia (AO-27), oiler
- USS Antona (IX-133), oiler tanker barge
- YO-76, oiler tanker barge
- USS Bullwheel (YO-46), oiler tanker barge
- USS Gamage (IX-227), storage for lubricants and drummed petroleum
- USS Giraffe (IX-118), gasoline tanker
- USS Quiros, water tanker
- USS Athanasia, stores ship
- USS Palisana (AF-39), stores ship
- USS Latona (AF-35), stores ship
- USS Graffias (AF-29), stores ship
- USS Trefoil (IX-149), stores ship
- USS Quartz (IX-150), stores ship
- USS Megrez (AK-126), stores ship
- USS Aldebaran, food stores ship
- USS Polaris (AF-11), food stores ship
- USS Sirius (AF-60), refrigerator food stores ship
- USS Rutilicus (AK-113), food stores ship
- SS Cape Pilar, merchant food stores ship
- USS Ascella, medical stores ship
- USS Azimech, medical stores ship
- USS Iolanda, stores ship
- USS Carmita (IX-152), stores ship
- USS Arctic (AF-7), stores ship
- USS Gordonia (AF-43), stores ship
- USS Hesperia, stores ship
- USS Volans, stores ship
- USS Karin (AF-33), stores ship
- USS Adria, stores ship
- USS Antares (AG-10), stores ship
- USS Lioba (AF-36), stores ship
- USS Kerstin (AF-34), stores ship
- USS Luna, stores ship
- USS Corundum (IX-164), spare parts
- USS Trefoil (IX-149), stores ship
- USS Silica (IX-151) fresh, frozen food, and dry provisions,
- APL-15 – None propelled barracks ship
- USS Orvetta (IX-157), barracks ship
- USS Sea Hag, barracks ship
- USS Seaward (IX-209) troopship and mail ship (was USS LST-278)
- YF-1038 cover lighter Type B ship
- YG-36, YG-33 and YG-37 self-propelled Garbage lighter
- YF-254 lighter
- YC-1006 lighter
- YP-688 lighter
- YF-788 lighter
- YF-786 lighter
- USS Turkey (AMS-56) minesweeper
- USS Unadilla (ATA-182) Tugboat, Type V ship
- USS Chickasaw (AT-83), Tug
- USS Jicarilla (ATF-104), Tug
- USS ATR 71, Tug
- USS AT 116, Tug
- USS YTB-372, Tug
- USS Hitchiti (ATF-103), Tug
- USS YTB-384, Tug
- USS Mobile Point, Tug
- USS Arapaho (ATF-68), Tug
- USS Point Loma, dredge ship
- USS Benson, dredge
- Landing Ship, Tanks (LST) for moving supplies
- Small landing craft for moving supplies and personal
- Motor Launch boats for moving personal

=== Eniwetok destroyer base ===
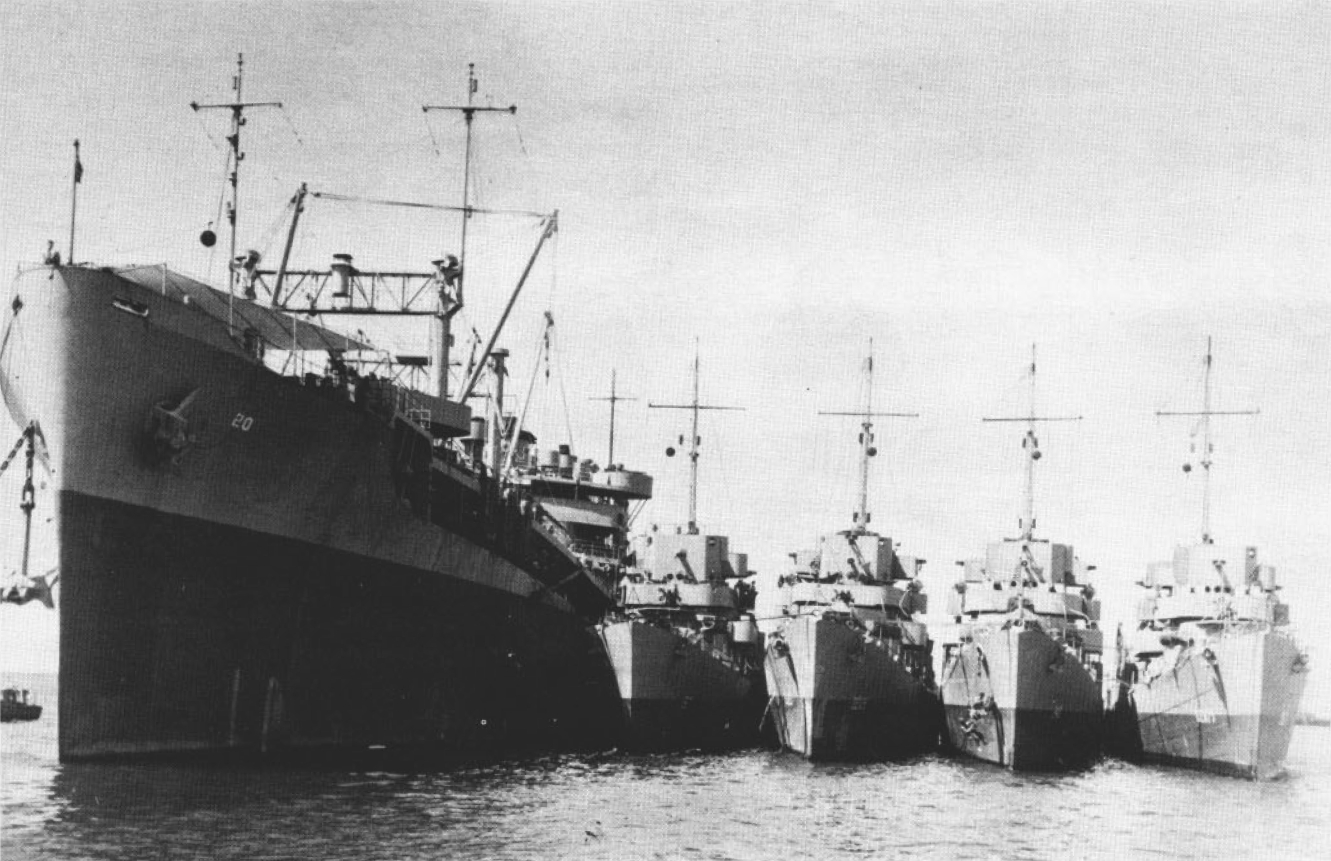
USS Hamul (AD-20), a destroyer tender, with destroyer escorts during World War II

Hundreds of US Navy destroyers were used in the Pacific war. Destroyers were used to protect capital ships like aircraft carriers, battleships and heavy cruisers. Destroyers were used to screen and protect convoy of ships. Destroyers were used to hunt submarines and protect amphibious landings at beaches. Destroyers had anti-aircraft guns, radar, and forward-launched ASW weapons, dual-purpose guns, depth charges, and torpedoes. Destroyers needed to be restocked with food, fuel, supplies, and weapons to keep operational. Eniwetok had a large destroyer base, with destroyer tenders. These ships could do minor repair work with major work done at the Eniwetok repair depot.

- Destroyer tenders stationed at Eniwetok:
- USS Cascade (AD-16)
- USS Prairie (AD-15)
- USS Piedmont (AD-17)
- USS Yosemite (AD-19)
- USS Hamul (AD-20)
- USS Dixie (AD-14)
- USS Sierra (AD-18)
- USS Markab

=== Eniwetok submarine base ===
Many US Navy submarines were used in the Pacific War. The submarine attacked warships and sank supply ships that were needed by Japan to resupply their many bases in the Pacific. US subs also did reconnaissance patrols, landed guerrilla special forces and search and rescue missions for downed aircrew men. US submarine had long ranges, but needed to be resupplied with fuel, food, torpedoes and deck gun shells. At Naval Base Eniwetok the Navy set up a floating submarine base in the atoll. The submarine tenders: USS Sperry (AS-12) and USS Beaver were stationed in the atoll to supply the submarines. While the submarine was being resupplied, and repaired if needed, crews could have a break (R&R) at the atoll's fleet recreation center. Some of the subs stationed at the base were: USS Tunny (SS-282), USS Salmon (SS-182), USS Darter (SS-227), USS Spearfish (SS-190), USS Scabbardfish (SS-397), USS Sargo (SS-188), USS Thresher (SS-200), USS Tilefish (SS-307), and USS S-35 (SS-140).

=== Eniwetok floating hospital ===
Naval Base Eniwetok was used as a major forward Naval hospital. US Navy Hospital ships were stationed Naval Base Eniwetok during parts of the war and some were stationed shortly as they joined staging for upcoming invasions. Hospital ships also were able to resupply and refuel at the base.

- USS Relief (AH-1), 550-beds, stationed at Eniwetok September 1944, to help with a dysentery outbreak at the atoll.
- USS Mercy (AH-8), up to 400 patients
- USS Hope (AH-7), up to 400 patients
- USS Solace (AH-5) up to 418 patients

=== Net laying ===
To protect the many ships at Eniwetok the Navy had anti-torpedo net installed. The ship USS Tuscana (AKN-3) supplied the nets. The ships also installed the moorings at Eniwetok.

- Net laying ships stationed at Eniwetok:
- USS Anaqua
- USS Rosewood (AN-31)
- USS Keokuk (CMc-6)
- USS Pinon (AN-66)
- USS Chinaberry (AN-61)
- USS Suncook (AN-80)
- USS Corkwood (AN-44)
- USS Cohoes (AN-78)
- USS Hoptree (AN-62)

=== Submarine chaser base ===
To help protect the base and shipping around the base, Naval Base Eniwetok had a fleet of submarine chasers. The submarine chasers were supported by a submarine chaser tender ship: the USS Mindanao (ARG-3) was stationed at Eniwetok to support the fleet of submarine chasers and some crash boats. crash boats were fast boats use to rescue downed airmen. Some of the submarine chasers served at Eniwetok: PC-1080, USS PC-1137, USS PC-1142, USS PC-1136, USS PGM-18, USS PC-1138, USS Winnemucca (PC-1145), and USS PC-598.

== Fleet support ==
Naval Base Eniwetok was used for the Admiral Raymond A. Spruance's United States Fifth Fleet anchorage. Ships in the Fifth Fleet were able to resupply, and refuel from Seron Ten, (Service Squadron 10). Resupply included food, freshwater for small crafts, spare parts and ammunition. Troops were able to have liberty leave at the fleet recreation. Eniwetok was used for staging upcoming missions. Eniwetok had a depot, tenders and repair ships for servicing amphibious ships and amphibious crafts in the southern anchorage, later moved to eastern anchorage. Eniwetok was the staging for the Marianas invasion, three hundred vessels supplied before departure. VPB-13 was staged at Eniwetok for weeks before the Guam campaign. Eniwetok also had spare fighter planes and parts for the aircraft carriers. The USS Bowditch (AG-30) had surveyed the lagoon to find the best mooring for large and small ships. USS Bowditch also placed the navigational markers for entrance and path through the atoll. The Fifth Fleet also used Naval Base Majuro and Naval Base Ulithi for resupply. After Naval Base Guam was re-established some of Seron Ten ships departed to support the new base there.

== LORAN station ==
The United States Coast Guard built a LORAN (Long Range Navigational Signal) station at Eniwetok in January 1951. The station closed 1978, as in 1978 the Global Positioning System replaced the need for LORAN.

== Post war ==
From 14 April 1948 through 18 August 1958, the United States conducted nuclear weapons testing at Eniwetok Atoll, exploding over 30 megatons. From 1977 to 1980, the US constructed a concrete dome on Runit Island, under which radioactive soil and debris were deposited.

== Gallery ==
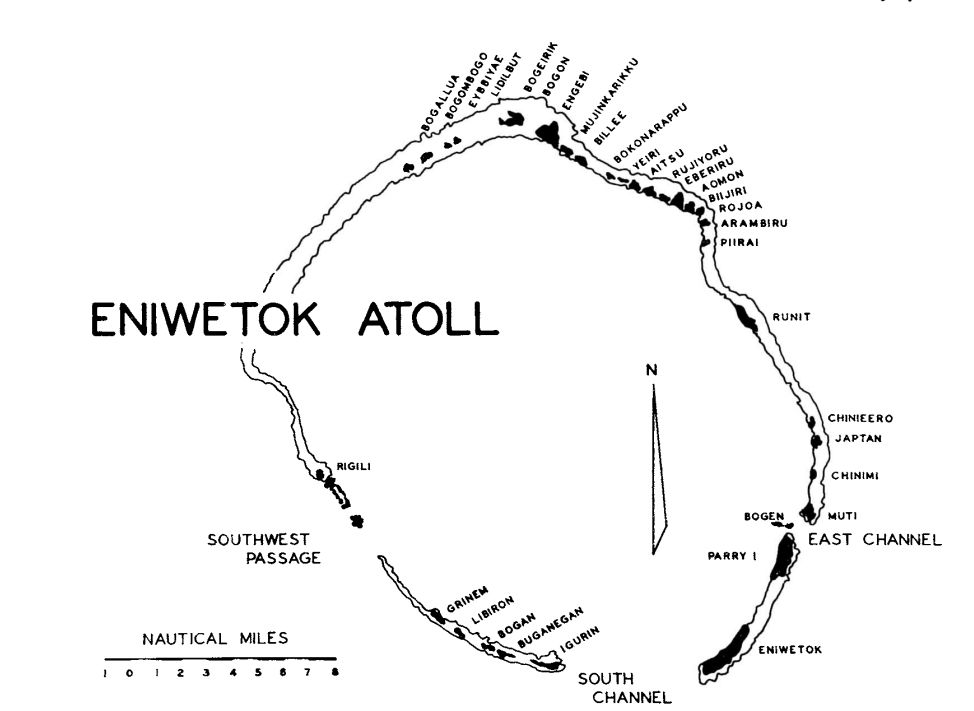
US Naval map from January 1966, with all island names.

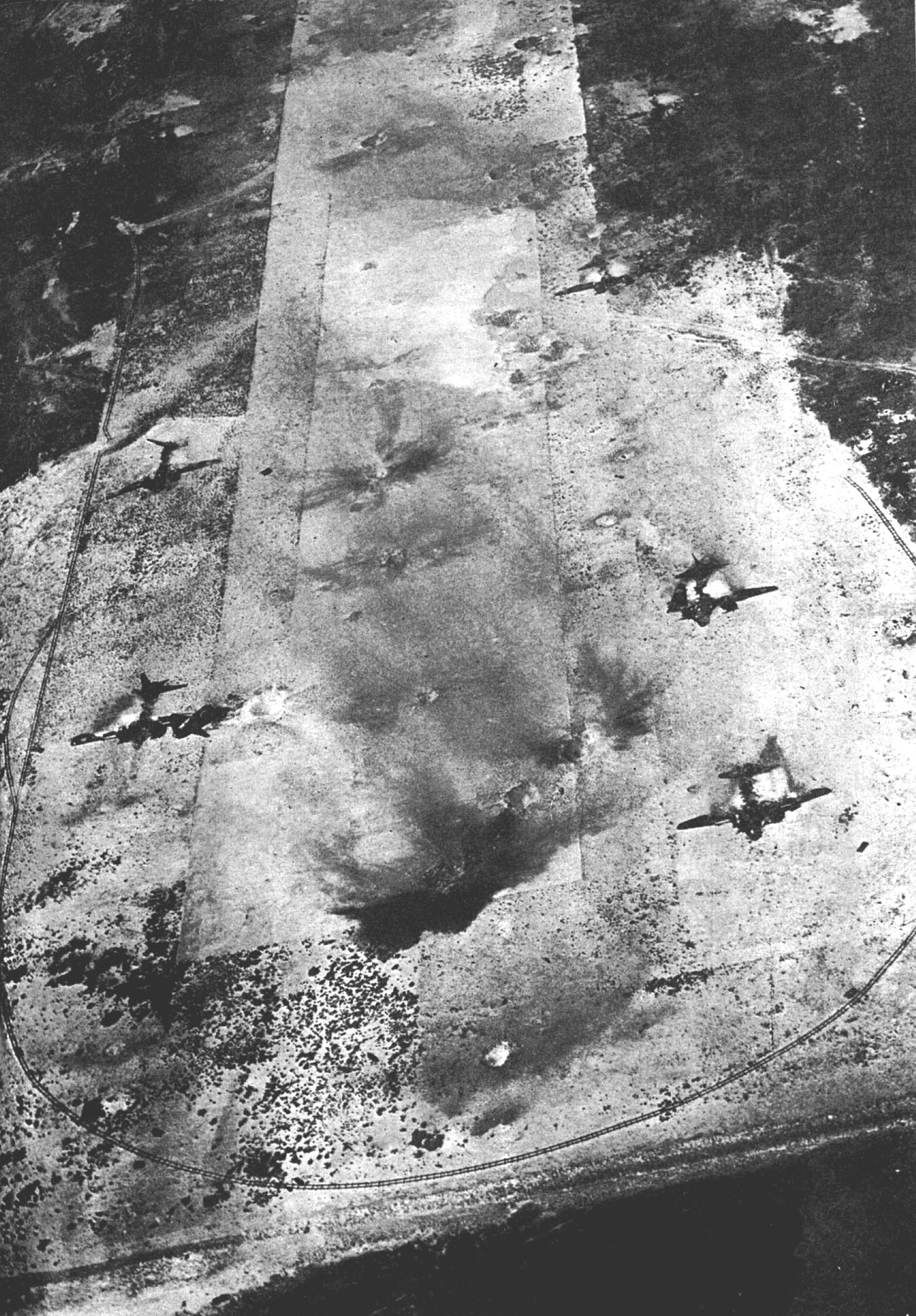
Burning Japanese aircraft on Engebi airfield 1944

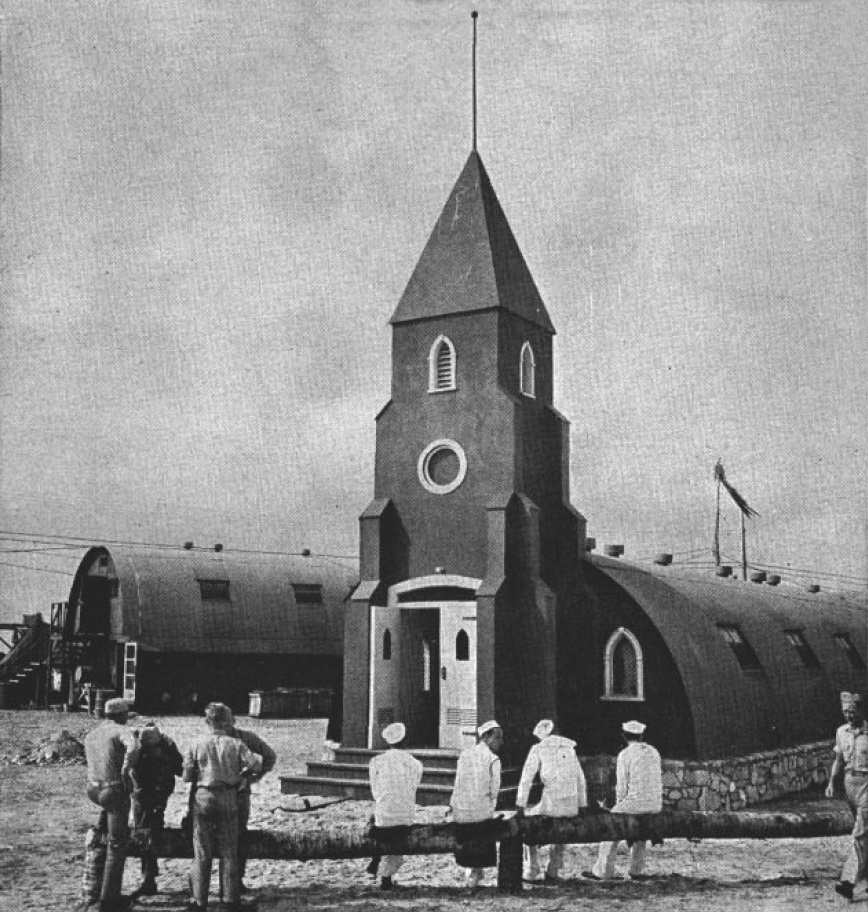
US Quonset hut chapel on Eniwetok 1944

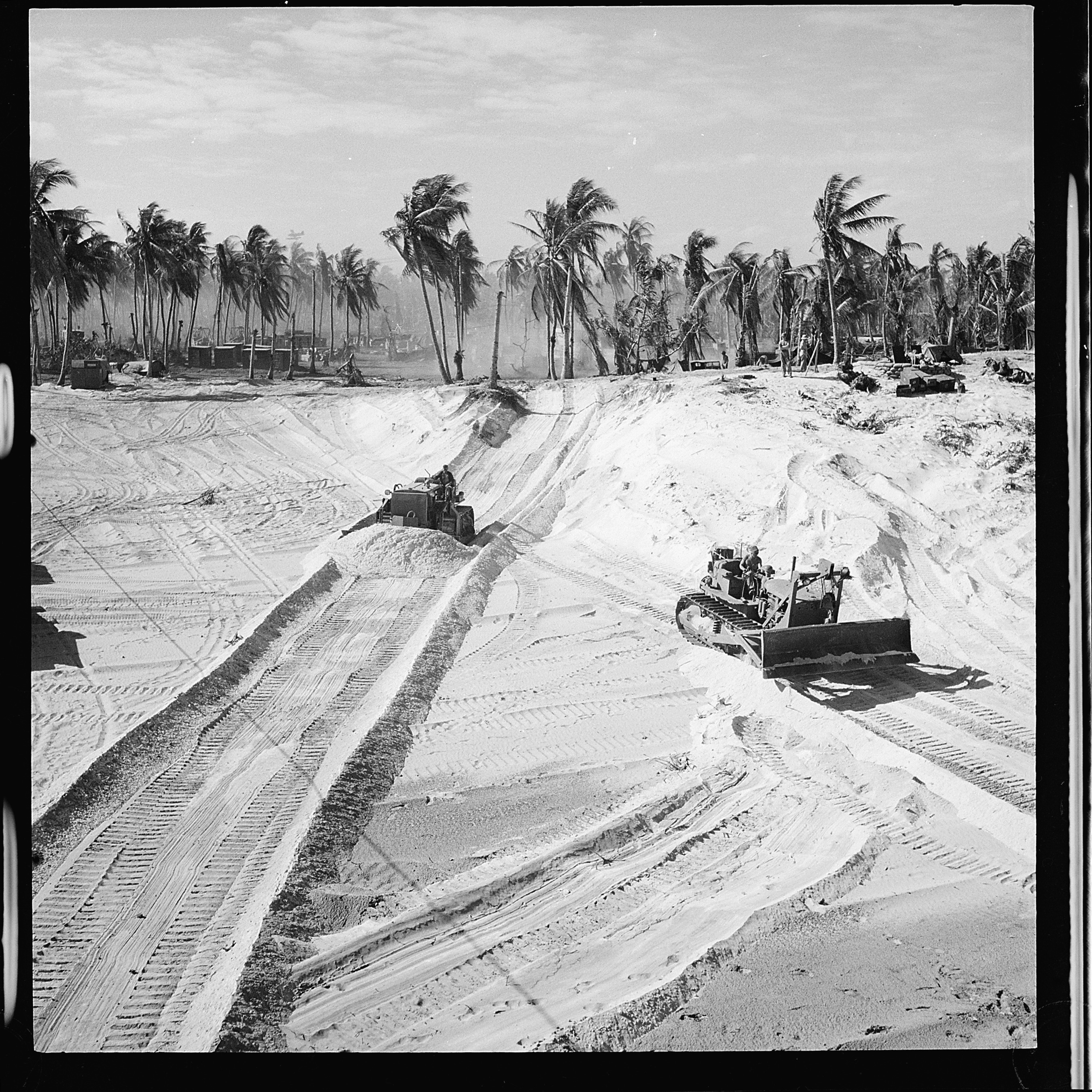
Construction on Eniwetok, Seabee Bulldozers working on airstrip

Seabee made Water trucks with pontoons to water the airstrip at Eniwetok to pack the coral on the airstrip in 1944.

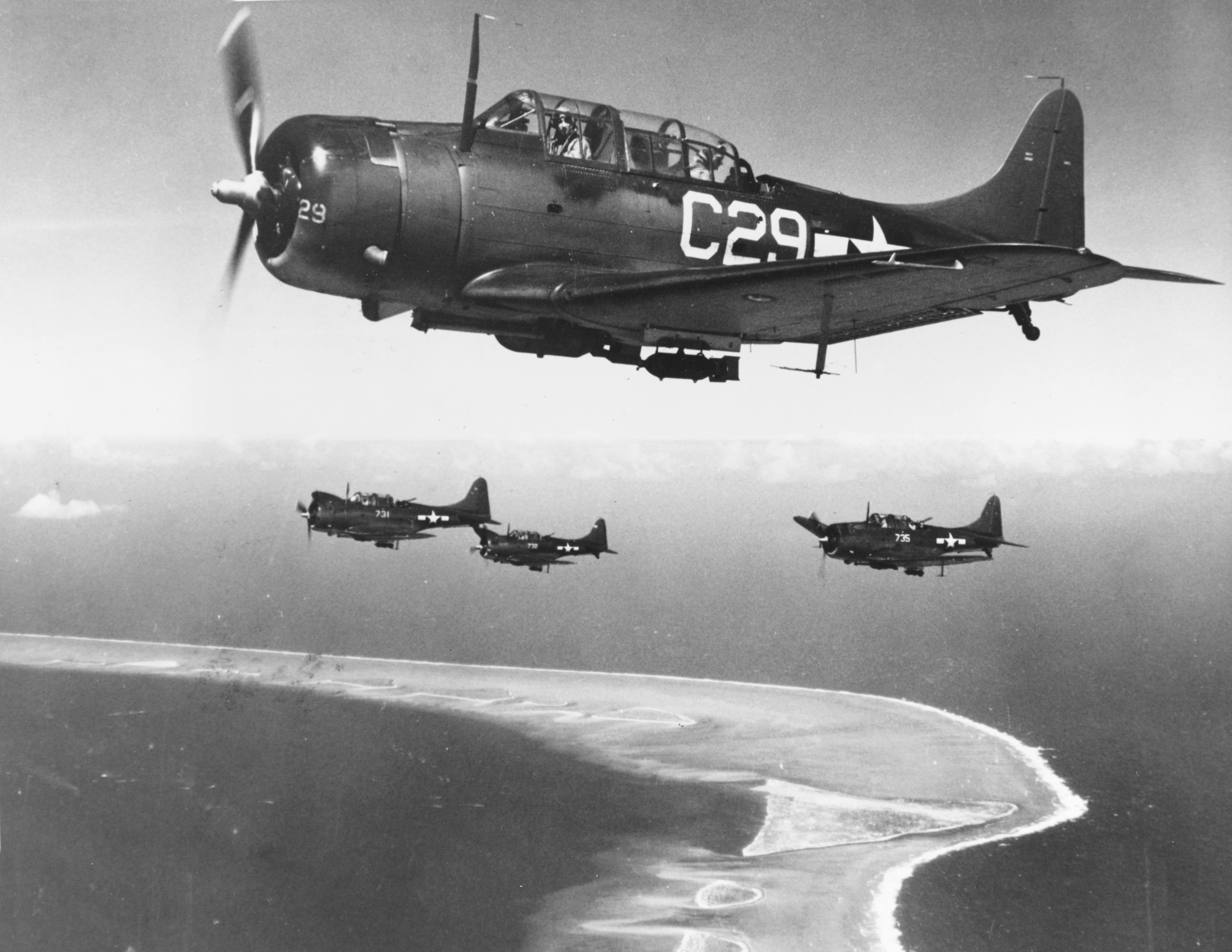
Douglas SBD Dauntless with Navy Unit VC-35 over Eniwetok, 18 February 1944

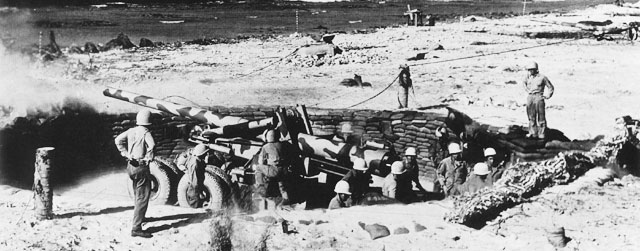
155-mm guns on Eniwetok

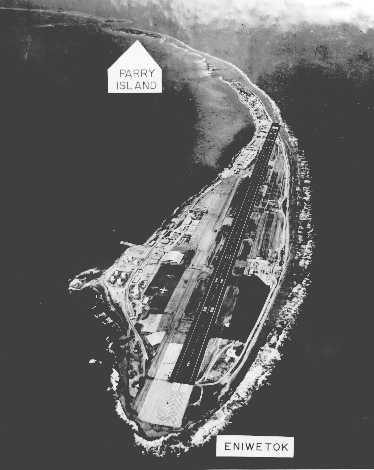
Aerial view of Enewetak and Parry

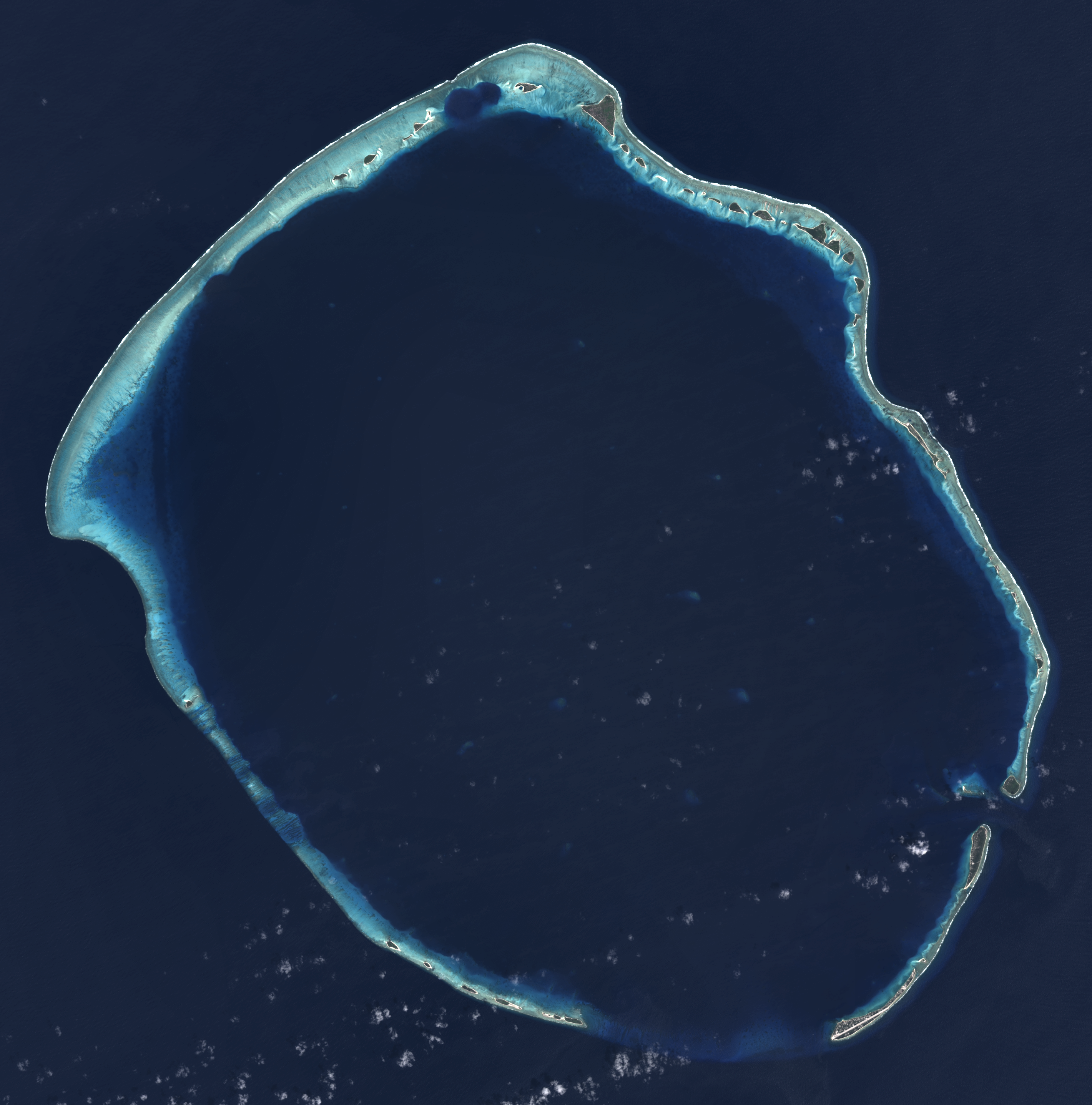
Enewetak Atoll in 2014 from Landsat 8

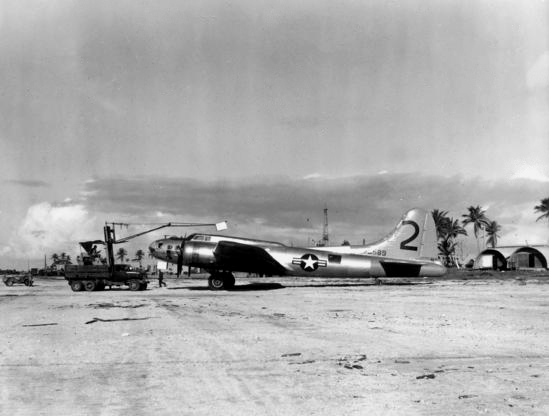
B-17 drone at Eniwetok Airfield in 1948 for Operation Sandstone

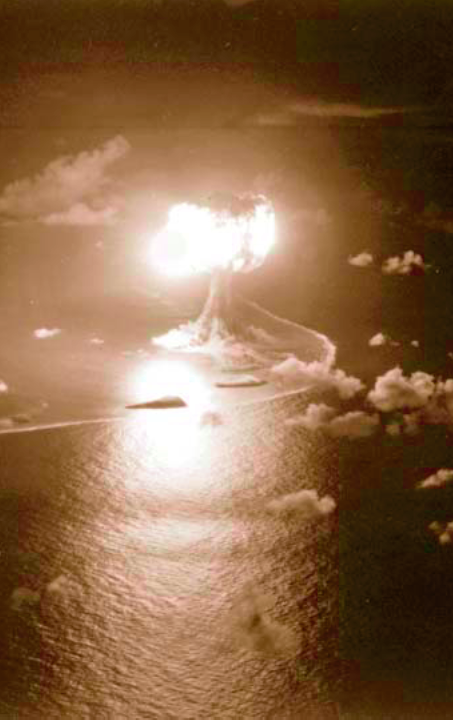
Operation Sandstone

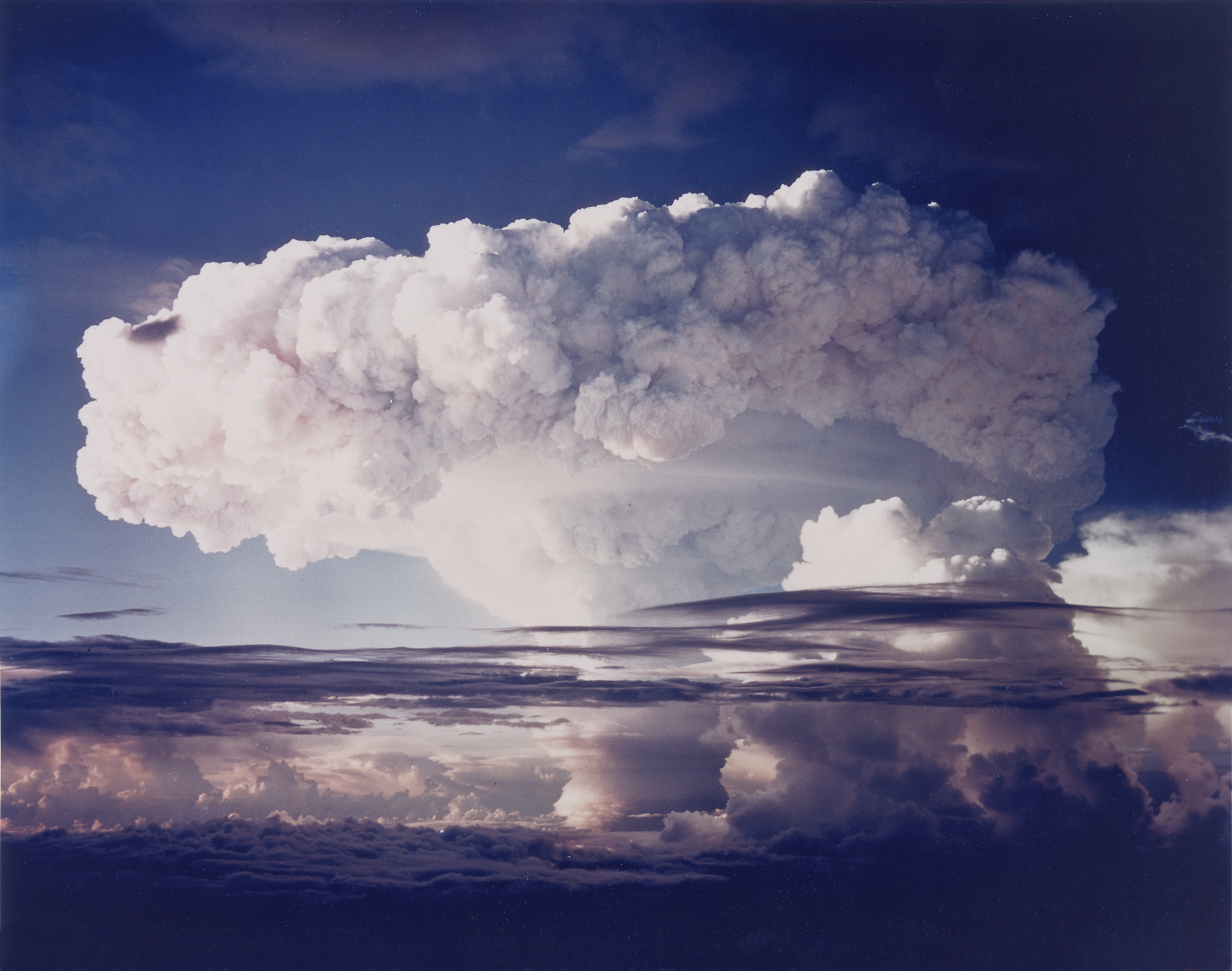
Ivy Mike test, October 31, 1952

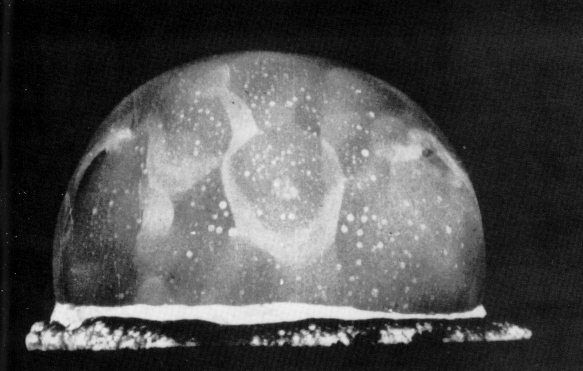
Operation Greenhouse test

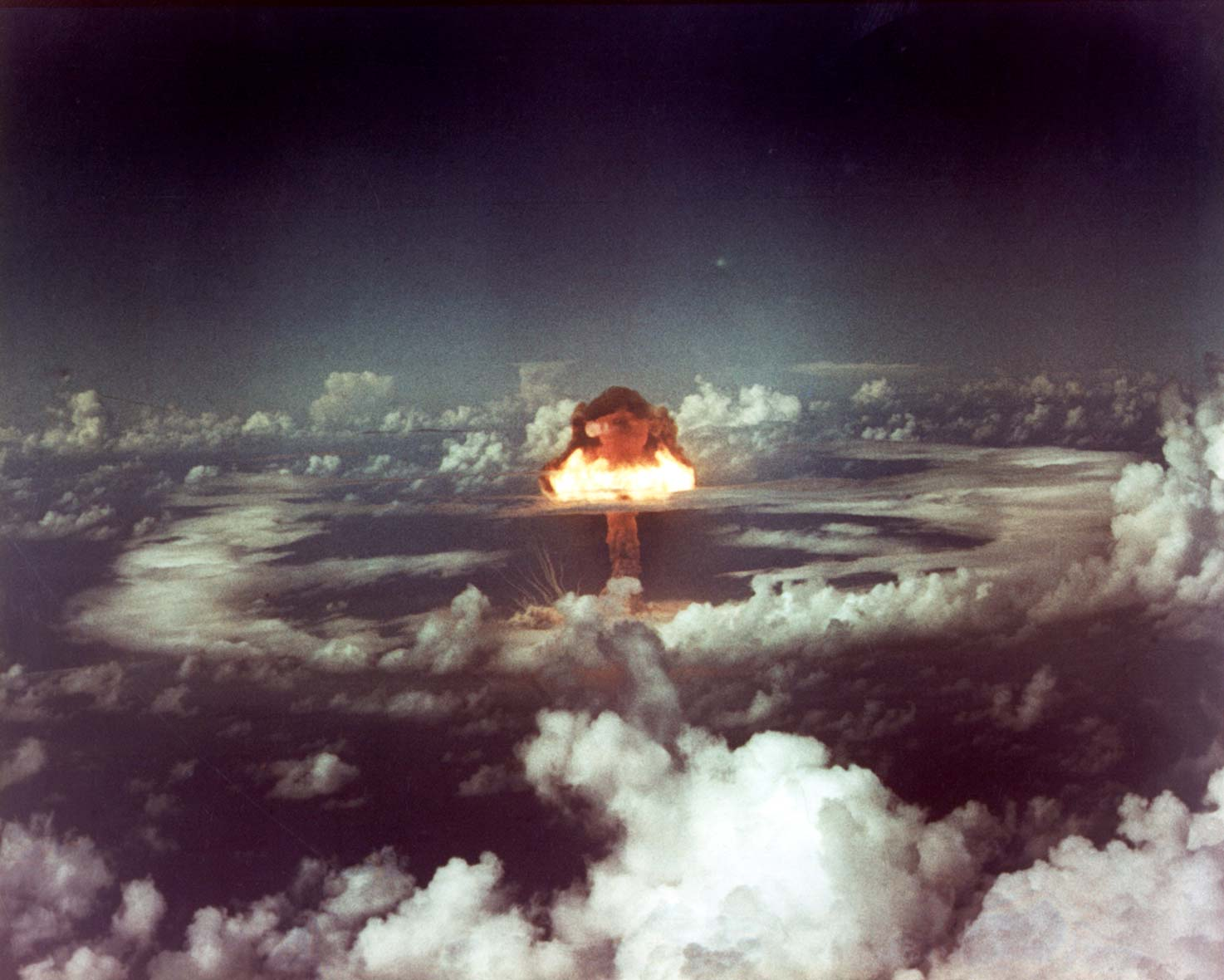
Ivy King test, November 1952

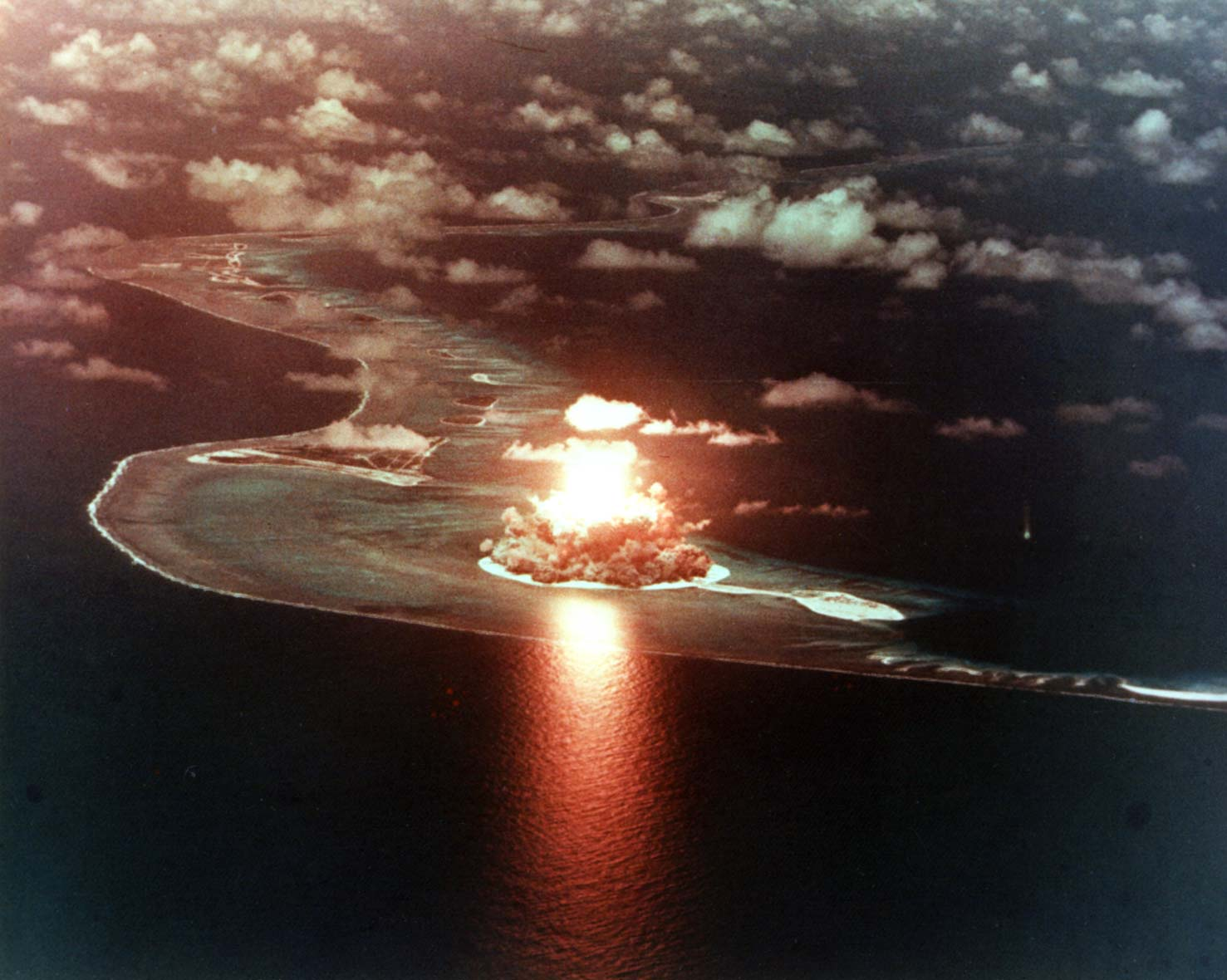
Test shot Seminole of Operation Redwing, conducted on the coast of the island of Bogon

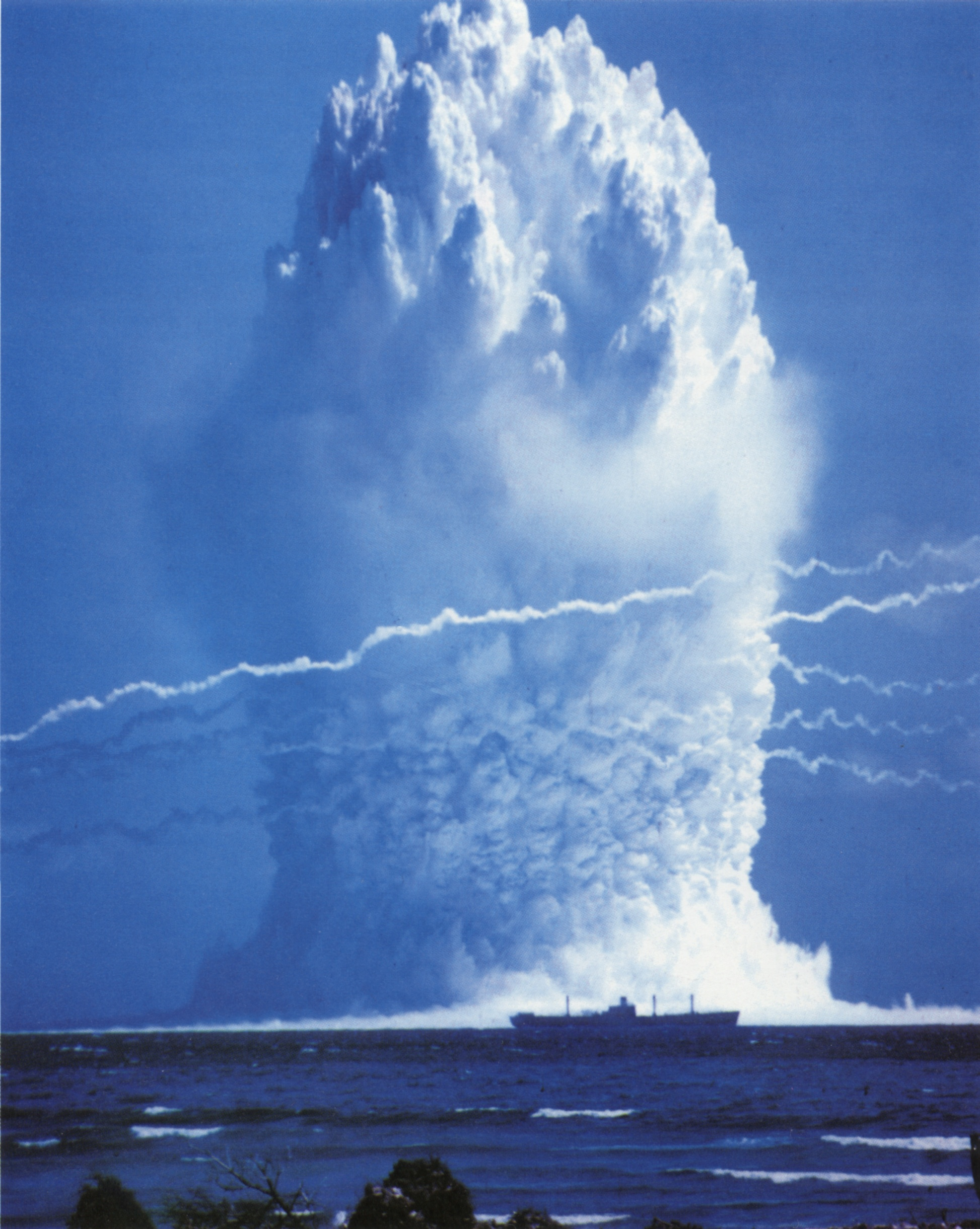
Hardtack Umbrella test

== See also ==
- US Naval Advance Bases
- Naval Base Marshall Islands
