= USS Baretta =

WWII-era US Naval ship

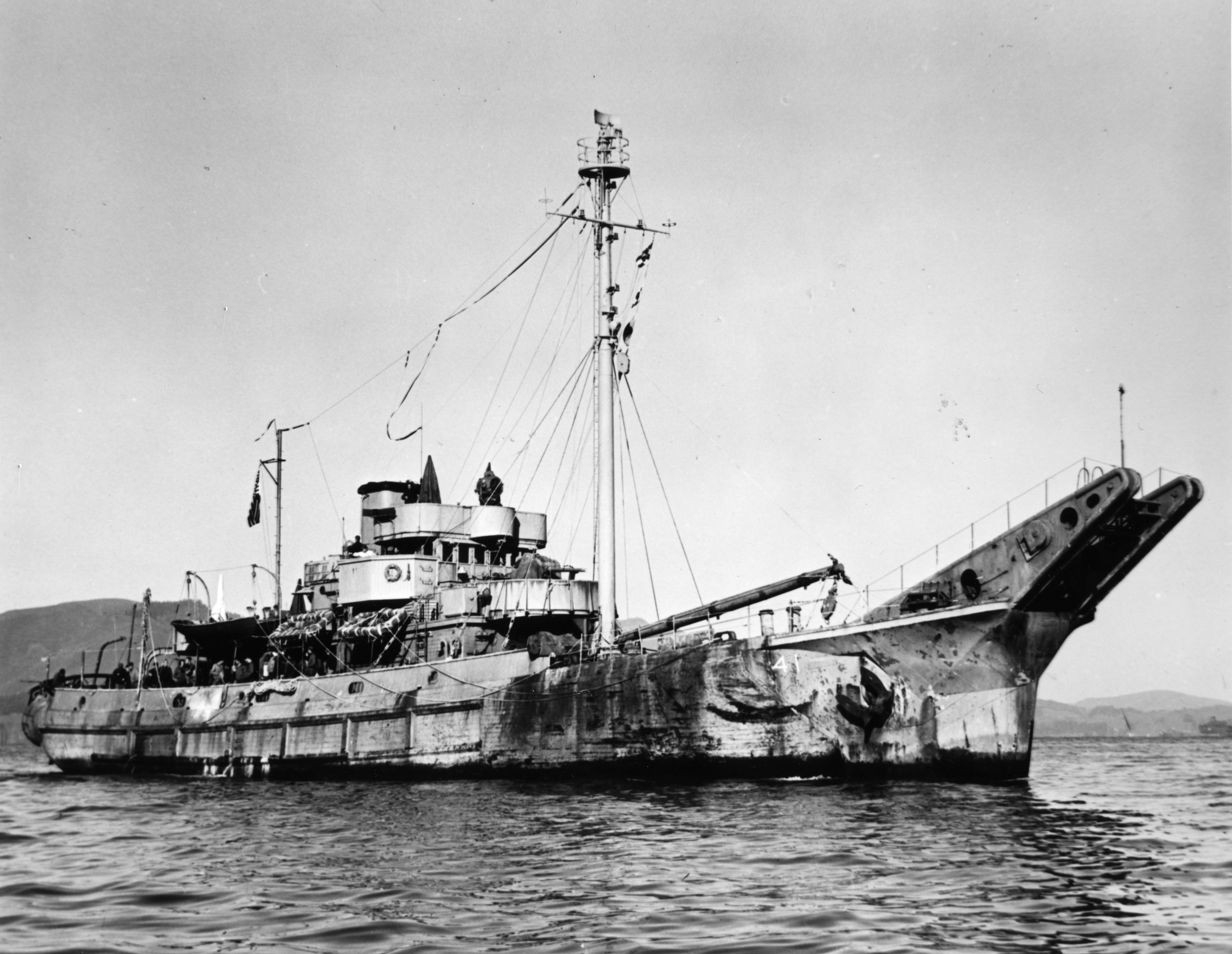

History

United States
- Name: USS Baretta
- Namesake: An evergreen shrub native to Texas and known for its purple blossoms
- Builder: Everett-Pacific Shipbuilding & Dry Dock Company, Everett, Washington
- Laid down: 19 December 1942, as Baretta (YN-60)
- Launched: 9 October 1943
- Sponsored by: Miss Evelyn Jaramo, the 11-year-old daughter of a shipfitter at the builder’s yard
- Commissioned: 18 March 1944 as USS Baretta (AN-41)
- Decommissioned: 4 April 1946, at Mare Island Navy Yard, Vallejo, California
- Reclassified: AN-41, 20 January 1944
- Stricken: 8 May 1946
- Honours and awards: one battle star for her service during World War II
- Fate: Transferred to the U.S. Maritime Commission for disposal; fate unknown

General characteristics
- Class & type: Ailanthus-class net laying ship
- Tonnage: 1,100 tons
- Length: 194 ft 7 in (59.31 m)
- Beam: 37 ft (11 m)
- Draft: 13 ft 6 in (4.11 m)
- Propulsion: diesel electric, 2,500hp
- Speed: 12.1 knots
- Complement: 56 officers and enlisted
- Armament: one single 3 in (76 mm) gun mount, four twin 20 mm gun mounts
- Armor: wooden-hulled

USS Baretta (AN-41/YN-60) was an Ailanthus-class net laying ship which served with the U.S. Navy in the western Pacific Ocean theatre of operations during World War II. After surviving war action and Pacific Ocean typhoons, and she returned home safely after the war with one battle star to her credit.

== Launched in Washington ==
The wooden hulled net layer YN-60 was laid down on 19 December 1942 at Everett, Washington, by the Everett-Pacific Shipbuilding & Dry Dock Company; named Baretta on 17 March 1943; launched on 9 October 1943; sponsored by Miss Evelyn Jaramo, the 11-year-old daughter of a shipfitter at the builder's yard; reclassified AN-41 on 20 January 1944; and commissioned at her builder's yard on 18 March 1944.

== World War II service ==
=== Assigned to Pacific Ocean operations ===
After fitting out, shakedown training out of San Pedro, Los Angeles, and post shakedown repairs, the net laying ship sailed for Hawaii and arrived at Pearl Harbor on 29 June. On 20 July, the net layer was ordered to report to the Commander, Service Force, Pacific, for duty "in the forward areas" and loaded mooring and net gear into August.

Sailing in Task Group (TG) 32.6 on 8 August, Baretta proceeded to the Solomon Islands and entered Gavutu Harbor near Guadalcanal on the 26th. She remained there until getting underway on 4 September to rejoin Task Group 32.6. After taking position in the convoy, Baretta proceeded toward the Palau Islands. The convoy reached Peleliu on 18 September, three days after the initial landings there.

After receiving instructions near Orange Beach, Baretta escorted LST-661 to Kossol Passage, arriving on 22 September. There, she took on board the men and equipment of the fleet post office to be established at Peleliu. Underway again on 24 September, she reached that island later in the day and transferred her passengers to Leonard Wood (APA 12) the next morning.

=== Palau Islands operations ===
For the next four months, Baretta maintained net defenses in the Palaus. On 26 September, she commenced working on moorings in Saipan Town Harbor, Angaur, but was interrupted by an enemy air raid and, later by worsening seas that made the anchorage unsafe. In the afternoon of 29 September, she received a request for help from LCT 867, that had fouled a mine with her anchor. Baretta proceeded to the scene and stood by while the landing craft carefully cut her anchor cable and then crept away from the peril.

Baretta resumed her work on moorings but, on 1 October, worsening weather forced her to stop. In the midst of a moderate gale the next morning, LCT-404 requested help for an LCM whose ramp had jammed in the down position. Baretta answered the call, towing the craft alongside stern first, and then into the lee of the island off Red Beach. When the LCM's ramp had been freed and secured, the landing craft proceeded under her own power to Red Beach.

Later that day, Baretta retrieved an unmanned LCVP adrift in a seaway. She took the landing craft in tow, but the line parted and heavy seas prevented further attempts to salvage the LCVP. At 1022 on 4 October, Baretta was lying off Angaur Island when LCT-579 struck a mine 300 yards off shore. Baretta's motor launch sped to the scene with a rescue party and removed 11 injured men before the damaged craft sank.

=== Kossol Passage operations ===
Through the rest of 1944, Baretta repaired and supplied landing craft and helped to retrieve them when they broached or became stranded. After transferring gear on 3 January 1945, Baretta sailed to Kossol Passage and, following operations in that vicinity, got underway with Spangler (DE 696) on the 10th for the Caroline Islands. A submarine contact on 12 January enlivened the voyage, and a submarine alert soon after Baretta entered Ulithi lagoon sent everyone to general quarters before she had moored.

Later that day, Baretta sailed for Eniwetok. On the 16th, her crew put out an engine room fire in little more than an hour; but it left her engines inoperable. As a result, Cliffrose (AN 42) towed her sister ship for the remainder of the voyage. Arriving on 21 January, Baretta spent five days under temporary repair alongside Oahu (ARG 5). She got underway under her own power on the 26th and reached Pearl Harbor on 8 February for major repairs which lasted into the spring.

=== Supporting Guam operations ===
The net layer departed Pearl Harbor on 16 April and proceeded via Eniwetok to Guam, arriving at Apra Harbor on 3 May. After discharging her cargo, Baretta reported to the Commander, Forward Area, Pacific, for temporary duty and sailed for Ulithi to relieve Viburnum (AN-57) that had been damaged by a mine. Baretta reached Ulithi on the 7th and, for the next three weeks, operated on the main net line there, "upending, repairing, and replacing the anti-torpedo panels." She devised a new method of handling the nets, which both saved time and reduced the possibility of damage to the buoys. "The new overlap method," according to her war diary, "proved quick and safe."

Baretta worked at Ulithi into late June, retrieving, rigging, and laying anti-torpedo net moorings, until getting underway for the Ryukyus on 28 June in a 16 ship convoy. Detached on 4 July when five miles west of the southern tip of Okinawa, Baretta proceeded independently to Kerama Retto to relieve Terebinth (AN 59). She and her sister ships then recovered the anchor legs of the fleet telephone moorings in Kerama Retto for transfer to Buckner Bay. Before proceeding to that place, Baretta assisted LCT-466 that had lost her ramp and taken a 10-degree list to starboard. Baretta built a wooden jury ramp, repaired the tank landing craft's leaking starboard ballast tank and shifted the cargo load to port.

=== Okinawa operations ===
The next afternoon, Baretta moved to the anchorage at Unten Ko, off northeastern Okinawa where she was protected from a raging typhoon. By the 21st, the storm had abated and finally Baretta moved to Buckner Bay. Upkeep and logistics occupied her for about a week. Then she joined Stagbush (AN-69) and Winterberry (AN-56), and together they laid the fleet telephone moorings in Buckner Bay on 27 and 28 July.

On 1 August 1945, another typhoon forced her to seek shelter again. Underway at 0700, Baretta raced up the east coast of Okinawa, battered by a strong wind from the northeast. She rolled 30 degrees to each side before reaching the relatively tranquil waters of Katena Ko, a typhoon anchorage two miles south of Unten Ko. Baretta rode out the blow "anchored bow and stern with two auxiliary minesweepers tied alongside."

=== Salvaging a Japanese midget submarine ===
After the storm passed, she proceeded with Catclaw (AN 60) to Uten Ko where they salvaged a Japanese midget submarine. Baretta returned to Buckner Bay on the 11th and, the next day, commenced net maintenance work south of the entrance gate at Buckner Bay. At 1700 on the afternoon of 14 August, all minecraft were "directed to be prepared for departure on one hour's notice." At 0800 the next morning, Baretta was proceeding to the net line when she received word by radio notifying "...all ships present that Japan's surrender had been officially accepted and all offensive action was to cease."

=== End-of-war operations ===
To prepare for the occupation of Japan, paths through the mine strewn approaches to the ports of debarkation had to be cleared. Such an effort required the support of ships like Baretta. On 4 September, the net layer proceeded to Unten Ko to load navigational gear to be used in marking the Kii Suido channel off the port of Wakayama. There she took on concrete "clump" anchors and navigational buoys before loading additional equipment at Buckner Bay.

She reached the entrance to Kii Suido at noon on 11 September and stood into Wakayama in the wake of the second sweep unit. Two hospital ships and a U.S. 5th Fleet task group followed. The next morning, Fraser (DM 24) and Stagbush began laying channel buoys. Baretta later joined them, planting buoys at three-mile intervals. Each of the net layers received a "well done" from Fraser.

=== Surviving in a typhoon ===
On the evening of the 16th, weather reports warned of an approaching typhoon; and, at 0920 on the 17th, "all ships received orders to be ready to get underway on 30 minutes notice." After letting out more anchor chain, Baretta waited as the wind increased to force 6 by 1800. Dragging anchor, LCI-814 fouled the net layer's bow at 1855. Baretta backed down and released more chain, enabling the landing craft to free herself.

During the night, the wind velocity increased until, at 0100 on the 18th, Baretta clocked it at between 81 and 89 knots. Yard and landing craft in her vicinity continually dragged anchors, but Baretta's bow anchor held. By 0730, the wind quieted to 30 knots, and Baretta headed for the lee of Awajii Island to avoid heavy swells coming from the northeast.

The storm abated that afternoon, and Baretta returned to Wakanoura Wan and surveyed the devastation: three LST's and a YMS lay stranded on the northern beaches of the anchorage and a PBY "Catalina" seaplane had been sunk. On the 19th, the net layer replanted a mid channel radar buoy in Kii Suido which the typhoon had dragged some 500 yards away from its original position.

=== A gift of 30 cases of beer ===
An unusual assignment came next. While entering Kii Suido on 22 September, the battleship California (BB 44) had snagged a channel buoy in her streamed paravanes, taking it with her some 25 miles before she anchored. Baretta recovered the "kidnapped" buoy and received, in compensation, "thirty cases of beer from the BB...."

Baretta spent the rest of the year laying and replanting buoys around the Ryukyus and in the Japanese home islands. She departed Japan on 29 December and proceeded via Eniwetok and Pearl Harbor to the California coast.

== Post-war inactivation and disposal ==
Baretta underwent pre-inactivation overhaul at the Mare Island Navy Yard and was decommissioned there on 4 April 1946. Her name was struck from the Navy list on 8 May 1946, but her ultimate fate remains obscure. One source indicates that she was acquired by Mr. O. Clive Webster, of Bermuda, on 20 January 1947. Yet, another suggests that she was transferred to the U.S. Maritime Commission and gives 24 January 1947 as the date on which that occurred. To add to the mystery, merchant registers do not mention the ship in their postwar issues.
