= Prefect (disambiguation) =

Prefect is a magisterial title of varying definition, but which, basically, refers to the leader of an administrative area. It may also refer to:

== Officials ==
=== Ancient Rome ===
- Urban prefect, prefect of the city of Rome, later of Constantinople
- Praetorian prefect, a high official, originating as the commander of the Praetorian Guard

=== Roman Catholic Church ===
- Apostolic prefect, a priest who heads an apostolic prefecture, a missionary area where the Catholic Church is not yet sufficiently developed to have it made a diocese

=== France ===
- Prefect (France), (French: préfet), the French state's representative in a department or region
- Prefect of Police (Préfet de police), head of the Prefecture of Police (French: Préfecture de police), an agency of the Government of France
- Maritime Prefect, a servant of the French state who exercises authority over the sea in one particular region (a Préfecture maritime)
- Prefect of Saint Pierre and Miquelon, the local representative of the President of France and in effect the governor or executive officer of the territory

=== Romania ===
- Prefect (Romania), an official of the national government assigned to each county

== Transportation ==
- Ford Prefect, a line of British cars produced by the UK division of Ford Motor Company
- Slingsby Prefect, a 1948 British modernisation of the 1932 single-seat Grunau Baby glider
- Grob G 120TP, an aircraft which in British service is called the Prefect

== Arts and entertainment ==
- The Prefect, a 2007 science fiction novel by Alastair Reynolds
- Ford Prefect (character), in The Hitchhiker's Guide to the Galaxy
- The Prefects, a British punk band

== Other uses ==
- HMS Prefect, a Royal Navy net laying ship in the Second World War
- School prefect, in some schools, a pupil who has been given certain responsibilities, or, in other schools, some positions with varying responsibilities
