= USS Cornel =

History

United States
- Name: USS Cornel
- Namesake: A genus of trees, one of the most common of which is the dogwood.
- Builder: Everett-Pacific Shipbuilding and Dry Dock Co., Everett, Washington
- Laid down: as Cornel (YN-64)
- Launched: 21 April 1944
- Sponsored by: Mrs. P. Pigott
- Commissioned: 6 June 1944 as USS Cornel (AN-45)
- Decommissioned: 15 February 1946, at San Pedro, California
- Reclassified: AN-45, 20 January 1944
- Stricken: date unknown
- Fate: Returned to the U.S. Maritime Commission for disposal 29 January 1947

General characteristics
- Class & type: Ailanthus-class net laying ship
- Tonnage: 1,100 tons
- Length: 194 ft 7 in (59.31 m)
- Beam: 37 ft (11 m)
- Draft: 13 ft 6 in (4.11 m)
- Propulsion: diesel electric, 2,500 hp
- Speed: 12 knots
- Complement: 56 officers and enlisted
- Armament: one single 3 in (76 mm) gun mount, two single 20 mm gun mounts

USS Cornel (AN-45/YN-64) was an Ailanthus-class net laying ship which served with the U.S. Navy in the South Pacific Ocean theatre of operations during World War II. Her career was without major incident, and she returned home safely after the war.

== Launched in Washington ==
Cornel (AN-45) was launched 21 April 1944 by Everett Pacific Shipbuilding and Dry Dock Company, Everett, Washington, under a Maritime Commission contract; sponsored by Mrs. P. Pigott; and commissioned 6 June 1944.

== World War II service ==
Cornel sailed in convoy from San Pedro, California, 6 August 1944 for Eniwetok, arriving 15 September. On 9 October she reported at Ulithi to maintain nets, and except for short periods at Peleliu, in the Palau Islands, Cornel remained at Ulithi tending nets until the end of the war, then dismantling and salvaging them. She cleared Ulithi 17 October 1945 and arrived at San Pedro, California, 29 November.

== Post-war decommissioning ==
Cornel remained at San Pedro until decommissioned 15 February 1946. She was returned to the U.S. Maritime Commission for disposal 29 January 1947.
