= USS Shellbark =

History

United States
- Name: USS Shellbark (YN-91)
- Namesake: Shellbark Hickory
- Builder: Canuelette Shipbuilding Co., Inc., Slidell, Louisiana
- Laid down: 15 January 1943
- Launched: 31 October 1943
- Reclassified: AN-67, 20 January 1944
- Commissioned: 12 April 1944 as USS Shellbark (AN-67)
- Decommissioned: 19 April 1946 at Shanghai, China
- Stricken: 1 May 1946
- Fate: Sold and transferred to the Republic of China, 20 April 1946;

General characteristics
- Class & type: Ailanthus-class net laying ship
- Tonnage: 1,100 tons
- Displacement: 1,275 tons
- Length: 194 ft 6 in (59.28 m)
- Beam: 37 ft (11 m)
- Draft: 13 ft 6 in (4.11 m)
- Propulsion: direct drive diesel engine, 2,500hp, single propeller
- Speed: 12 knots (22 km/h)
- Complement: 56 officers and enlisted
- Armament: one single 3 in (76 mm) gun mount, three 20 mm gun mount

USS Shellbark (AN-67/YN-91) was a Ailanthus-class net laying ship which was assigned to protect U.S. Navy ships and harbors during World War II with her anti-submarine nets.

== Constructed in Slidell, Louisiana ==
Shellbark (AN-67) was laid down on 15 September 1943 by the Canulette Shipbuilding Co. Inc., Slidell, Louisiana, as YN-91; launched on 31 October 1943; redesignated as AN-67 on 20 January 1944; and commissioned on 12 April.

== World War II service ==
Shellbark sailed to Newport, Rhode Island, on the 30th to begin her shakedown cruise. Upon completion, she was in the Boston Navy Yard from 24 to 31 May.

She reported to the 1st Naval District for duty on 1 June. Shellbark was then assigned to the U.S. Atlantic Fleet for temporary duty with the U.S. 12th Fleet. The net layer arrived in Belfast, Northern Ireland, on 20 July and operated in English waters until she departed Plymouth, England, on 6 November.

Shellbark returned to Norfolk, Virginia, on 21 November 1944 and operated from there until departing on 20 February 1945 for San Francisco, California, via the Panama Canal Zone and San Diego, California. She stood out of San Francisco on 27 April en route to Pearl Harbor, arriving there on 7 May. She sailed from there 20 days later for Eniwetok, Guam, Saipan, and Okinawa.

Shellbark operated in the Okinawa area from 13 July to 20 September. On the 22d, she moved into Japanese home waters around Honshū, operating from Kobe and Wakayama, until 1 February 1946. On that date, she sailed for Shanghai. She arrived on 17 March and began preparations for decommissioning.

== Post-war inactivation ==
Shellbark was decommissioned on 19 April and sold to China the next day. She was struck from the Navy List on 1 May 1946.
