= USS Silverleaf =

History

United States
- Name: USS Silverleaf
- Namesake: The white poplar
- Builder: Canuelette Shipbuilding Co., Inc., Slidell, Louisiana
- Laid down: 3 February 1943 as Silverleaf (YN-92)
- Launched: 11 December 1943
- Commissioned: 26 May 1944 as USS Silverleaf (AN-68)
- Decommissioned: 18 April 1946 at San Pedro, California
- Reclassified: AN-68, 20 January 1944
- Stricken: 5 June 1946
- Home port: Melville, Rhode Island
- Honours and awards: one battle star for World War II service
- Fate: sold for scrapping, 31 March 1947

General characteristics
- Class & type: Ailanthus-class net laying ship
- Tonnage: 1,100 tons
- Displacement: 1,275 tons
- Length: 194 ft 6 in (59.28 m)
- Beam: 37 ft (11 m)
- Draft: 13 ft 6 in (4.11 m)
- Propulsion: direct drive diesel engine, 2,500hp, single propeller
- Speed: 12 knots
- Complement: 56 officers and enlisted
- Armament: one single 3 in (76 mm) gun mount, three 20 mm gun mounts

USS Silverleaf (AN-68/YN-92) was a Ailanthus-class net laying ship which was assigned to protect U.S. Navy ships and harbors during World War II with her anti-submarine nets.

== Constructed in Slidell, Louisiana ==
Silverleaf (AN-68) was laid down on 3 February 1943 as YN-92 by Canulette Shipbuilding Co. Inc., Slidell, Louisiana; launched on 11 December 1943; redesignated AN-68 on 20 January 1944; and commissioned on 26 May 1944.

== World War II service ==
On 6 June, Silverleaf sailed for Melville, Rhode Island, to hold her shakedown cruise from 13 to 30 June. She was in the Boston Navy Yard from 1 July to 29 August for post-shakedown availability.

The net layer moved to New York City and sailed from there on 3 September with a southbound convoy. On the 10th, she was ordered to proceed independently to San Diego, California, via the Panama Canal.

Silverleaf arrived at San Diego on 3 October and operated between there and San Pedro, California, until departing for Pearl Harbor on 5 December 1944. She remained there until 5 February 1945 when she steamed for Eniwetok, Marshall Islands. The tender was then attached to the U.S. 5th Fleet for the assault and occupation of Iwo Jima; remaining there with Task Force 94 until 10 August. From 13 August until 20 November 1945, Silverleaf operated from Guam and Marcus Island. On the 20th, she sailed for San Pedro, California, via Pearl Harbor, for disposal, arriving on 1 January 1946.

== Post-war inactivation ==
Silverleaf was stripped for sale to the Republic of China Government, but the ship was in such poor condition that she was decommissioned on 18 April. She was struck from the Navy list on 5 June 1946 and sold to Joe Medina Enterprises, San Diego, California, on 31 March 1947 for scrap.

== Honors and awards ==
Silverleaf received one battle star for World War II service.
