= Ailanthus-class net laying ship =

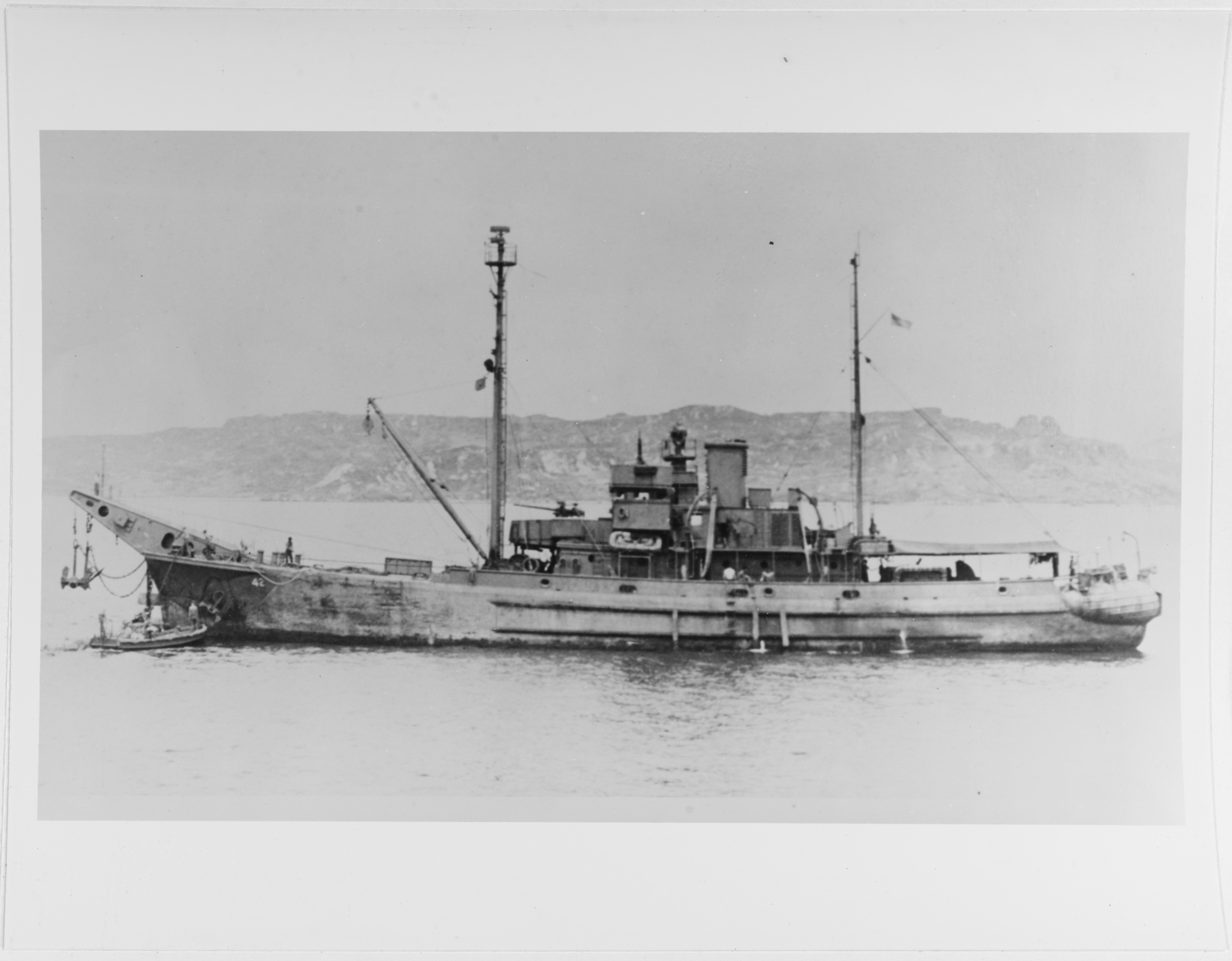
- USS Cliffrose (AN-42), circa 1945.

Class overview
- Builders: Everett-Pacific Shipbuilding & Dry Dock Company, Everett, Washington (10); Pollock-Stockton Shipbuilding Company, Stockton, California (10); Barbour Boat Works, New Bern, North Carolina (4); Snow Shipyards, Rockland, Maine (4); American Car and Foundry Co., St. Charles, Missouri (4); Canuelette Shipbuilding Co., Slidell, Louisiana (3)
- Operators: United States Navy (35); Royal Navy (5)
- Preceded by: Aloe class
- Succeeded by: Cohoes class
- Built: 1942–1943
- In commission: 1943–1947
- Completed: 35
- Lost: 2

General characteristics
- Type: Net tender
- Tonnage: 1,100 long tons (1,118 t) GRT
- Length: 194–198 ft (59–60 m)
- Beam: 34.5–37 ft (10.5–11.3 m)
- Draft: 11.75–13 ft (3.58–3.96 m)
- Propulsion: Busch-Sulzer 539 diesel-electric, no reduction gears, 1 shaft, 1,200 hp (895 kW)
- Speed: 12 knots (14 mph; 22 km/h)
- Complement: 56 men
- Armament: 1 × 3"/50 caliber gun; 2, later 4 × single 20 mm AA

The Ailanthus class were a group of 35 wooden-hulled net laying ships of the United States Navy built during World War II as part of the huge building programs of late 1941 and early 1942 for small patrol and mine warfare vessels. Five of the class were transferred to the British Royal Navy under Lend-Lease, and another five were converted while at their shipyards into Auxiliary Fleet Tugs, the ATA-214-class.

== Armament ==
In the original design, in addition to the 3-inch gun mounted forward of the bridge, there were two single 20 mm guns mounted on top of the bridge. In September 1944, as a trial, a third 20 mm gun was installed on a small elevated platform mounted on a pedestal between the bridge and the smokestack on Terebinth (AN-59), but it was found that the arc of fire was restricted, that the platform was too hot to permit the storage of ready ammunition, and that the gun crew became ill from engine fumes. Instead, two additional single 20 mm guns were installed at the after end of the deckhouse on AN 39-63 and 66-69. In April 1945 the four single mounts were ordered to be replaced with four twin mounts, but this change does not seem to have been made.

== Losses ==
Two ships of the class were lost during the war;

- USS Ailanthus (AN-38), was wrecked barely a month after commissioning, running aground in the Aleutians on 26 February 1944, and was declared a total loss on 14 March 1944.
- USS Snowbell (AN-52), was driven hard aground when Typhoon Louise hit Buckner Bay, Okinawa, on 9 October 1945 and was declared beyond repair. The wreck was blown up in January 1946.

== Disposal ==
In early 1946 six of the ships, Cliffrose (AN-42), Cinnamon (AN-50), Silverbell (AN-51), Torchwood (AN-55), Catclaw (AN-60), and Shellbark (AN-67), were transferred to the Republic of China's Maritime Customs Service at Shanghai, while the remainder were disposed of in 1947 in a Maritime Commission sales program for small vessels.

== Ships ==
Ship name	Hull	Builder	Comm.	Decomm.	Fate
Ailanthus	YN-57; AN-38	Everett-Pacific Shipbuilding & Dry Dock Company	2 Dec 1943	n/a	Ran aground in Alaskan waters, 26 Feb 1944; declared total loss
Bitterbush	YN-58; AN-39	Everett-Pacific Shipbuilding & Dry Dock Company	15 Jan 1944	4 Jan 1946	Sold to a commercial interest, 1948; destroyed by fire off Puerto Rico, 27 May 1954
Anaqua	YN-59; AN-40	Everett-Pacific Shipbuilding & Dry Dock Company	21 Feb 1944	7 Feb 1946	Sold to a commercial interest, 6 Mar 1946; fate unknown
Baretta	YN-60; AN-41	Everett-Pacific Shipbuilding & Dry Dock Company	18 Mar 1944	4 Apr 1946	Fate unknown
Cliffrose	YN-61; AN-42	Everett-Pacific Shipbuilding & Dry Dock Company	30 Apr 1944	7 Jan 1947	Transferred to Taiwan, 7 Jan 1947; fate unknown
Satinleaf	YN-62; AN-43	Everett-Pacific Shipbuilding & Dry Dock Company	8 Apr 1944	4 Apr 1946	Sold to a commercial interest, 29 Apr 1947; fate unknown
Corkwood	YN-63; AN-44	Everett-Pacific Shipbuilding & Dry Dock Company	16 May 1944	7 Mar 1946	Fate unknown
Cornel	YN-64; AN-45	Everett-Pacific Shipbuilding & Dry Dock Company	6 Jun 1944	15 Feb 1946	Fate unknown
Mastic	YN-65; AN-46	Everett-Pacific Shipbuilding & Dry Dock Company	4 Jul 1944	1 Mar 1946	Sold to a commercial interest, 6 Jun 1947; fate unknown
Canotia	YN-66; AN-47	Everett-Pacific Shipbuilding & Dry Dock Company	31 Jul 1944	18 Feb 1946	Fate unknown
Lancewood	YN-67; AN-48	Pollock-Stockton Shipbuilding Company	18 Oct 1943	11 Feb 1946	Transferred to France, 3 May 1947; fate unknown
Papaya	YN-68; AN-49	Pollock-Stockton Shipbuilding Company	1 Dec 1943	31 Jan 1946	Fate unknown
Cinnamon	YN-69; AN-50	Pollock-Stockton Shipbuilding Company	10 Jan 1944	25 Mar 1947	Transferred to Taiwan; fate unknown
Silverbell	YN-70; AN-51	Pollock-Stockton Shipbuilding Company	16 Feb 1944	10 Jan 1947	Transferred to Taiwan; fate unknown
Snowbell	YN-71; AN-52	Pollock-Stockton Shipbuilding Company	16 Mar 1944	5 Dec 1945	Damaged beyond economical repair by Typhoon Louise, 9 Oct 1945; hulk blown up, 14 Jan 1946
Spicewood	YN-72; AN-53	Pollock-Stockton Shipbuilding Company	7 Apr 1944	20 Feb 1946	Sold to a commercial interest; fate unknown
Manchineel	YN-73; AN-54	Pollock-Stockton Shipbuilding Company	26 Apr 1944	11 Mar 1946	Sold to a commercial interest, 20 Jun 1947; fate unknown
Torchwood	YN-74; AN-55	Pollock-Stockton Shipbuilding Company	12 May 1944	26 Oct 1946	Transferred to China; fate unknown
Winterberry	YN-75; AN-56	Pollock-Stockton Shipbuilding Company	30 May 1944	15 Feb 1946	Sold to a commercial interest, 31 Mar 1947; fate unknown
Viburnum	YN-76; AN-57	Pollock-Stockton Shipbuilding Company	2 Jun 1944	3 Jan 1946	Sold to a commercial interest; fate unknown
Abele	YN-77; AN-58	Barbour Boat Works, New Bern, NC	2 Jun 1944	1 Mar 1946	Fate unknown
Balm	YN-78; AN-59	Barbour Boat Works, New Bern, NC	5 Aug 1944	31 Jan 1946	Sold to a commercial interest, 23 Apr 1946; fate unknown
Precept; served as HMS Precept (Z266)	YN-79; AN-73	Barbour Boat Works, New Bern, NC	14 Oct 1944	4 Jan 1945	Fate unknown
Boxelder; served as HMS Precise (Z285)	YN-80; AN-74	Barbour Boat Works, New Bern, NC	21 Dec 1944	14 Dec 1945	Fate unknown
Catclaw	YN-81; AN-60	Snow Shipyards, Rockland, ME	14 Jan 1944	19 Apr 1946	Transferred to China; fate unknown
Chinaberry	YN-82; AN-61	Snow Shipyards, Rockland, ME	12 Mar 1944	26 Mar 1946	Sold to a commercial interest, 27 Feb 1950; fate unknown
Hoptree	YN-83; AN-62	Snow Shipyards, Rockland, ME	18 May 1944	1 Mar 1946	Sold to a commercial interest, 23 Apr 1947; sold for scrap, 1954
Whitewood	YN-84; AN-63; AG-129	Snow Shipyards, Rockland, ME	17 Jul 1944	1 Apr 1949	Sold for scrap, 8 Mar 1950
n/a	YN-85; AN-64	Canulette Shipbuilding Company, Slidell, LA	reordered as ATA-214 class tugboat		
n/a	YN-86; AN-65	Snow Shipyards, Rockland, ME	reordered as ATA-214 class tugboat		
Pinon	YN-87; AN-66	American Car and Foundry Company, Wilmington, DE	31 Mar 1944	5 Mar 1946	Sold to a commercial interest; destroyed by fire, 28 Aug 1961
Prefect; served as HMS Prefect (Z263)	YN-88; AN-75	American Car and Foundry Company, Wilmington, DE	3 Jun 1944	28 Dec 1945	Fate unknown
Satinwood; served as HMS Pretext (Z284)	YN-89; AN-76	American Car and Foundry Company, Wilmington, DE	5 Aug 1944	22 Nov 1945	Sold to a commercial interest; foundered off Newfoundland, 11 Nov 1982
Seagrape; served as HMS Preventer (Z265)	YN-90; AN-77	American Car and Foundry Company, Wilmington, DE	5 Aug 1944	22 Nov 1945	Transferred to New Zealand, 15 Aug 1956; sold to a commercial interest, Jun 1962; sunk, 11 Nov 1982
Shellbark	YN-91; AN-67	Canulette Shipbuilding Company, Slidell, LA	12 Apr 1944	19 Apr 1946	Transferred to China, 20 Apr 1946; fate unknown
Silverleaf	YN-92; AN-68	Canulette Shipbuilding Company, Slidell, LA	26 May 1944	18 Apr 1946	Sold for scrap, 31 Mar 1947
Stagbush	YN-93; AN-69	Canulette Shipbuilding Company, Slidell, LA	30 Aug 1944	26 Mar 1946	Sold to a commercial interest, Apr 1947; burned, 16 Oct 1954
n/a	YN-94; AN-70	Canulette Shipbuilding Company, Slidell, LA	reordered as ATA-214 class tugboat		
n/a	YN-95; AN-71	Canulette Shipbuilding Company, Slidell, LA	reordered as ATA-214 class tugboat		
n/a	YN-96; AN-72	Canulette Shipbuilding Company, Slidell, LA	reordered as ATA-214 class tugboat		
