= USS Abele =

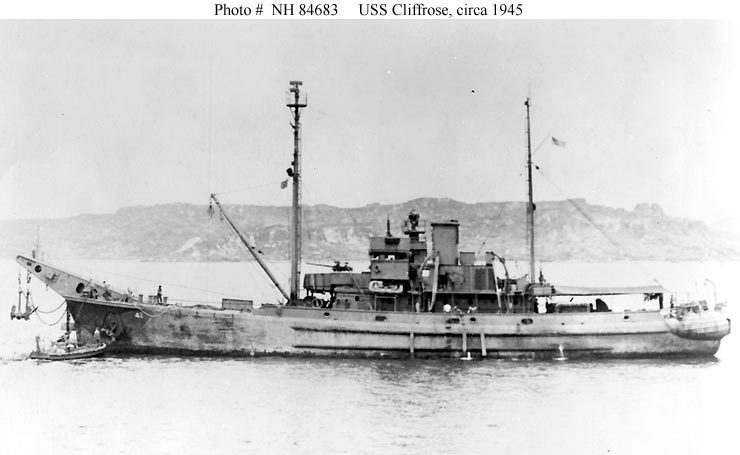
- USS Cliffrose, another Ailanthus-class ship.

History

United States
- Name: Abele
- Namesake: White poplar
- Builder: Barbour Boat Works, New Bern, North Carolina
- Laid down: 8 January 1943
- Launched: 19 August 1943
- Commissioned: 2 June 1944
- Decommissioned: 1 March 1946
- Stricken: 28 March 1946
- Fate: Transferred to Maritime Commission, 7 May 1947

General characteristics
- Class & type: Ailanthus-class net laying ship
- Displacement: 1,175 long tons (1,194 t)
- Length: 194.5 ft (59.3 m) o.a.; 169.2 ft (51.6 m) wl
- Beam: 37 ft (11 m)
- Draft: 13.5 ft (4.1 m)
- Installed power: 2 × Busch-Sulzer BS-539 diesel-electric engines; 1,200 shp (890 kW)
- Propulsion: 1 × Propeller
- Speed: 12.1 kn (22.4 km/h; 13.9 mph)
- Complement: 4 officers 52 enlisted
- Armament: 1 × 3 in (76 mm)/50 caliber gun; 2 × twin 20 mm (1 in) Oerlikon cannons

Service record
- Operations: Battle of Iwo Jima (19–28 February 1945); Okinawa Gunto operation (26 March–30 June 1945)
- Awards: Combat Action Ribbon (Okinawa); American Campaign Medal; Asiatic–Pacific Campaign Medal; World War II Victory Medal

USS Abele (AN-58) was a Ailanthus-class net laying ship in the service of the United States Navy, named after Populus alba, commonly called abele, silver poplar, or white poplar.

== Construction ==
She was laid down on 8 January 1943 at New Bern, North Carolina, by the Barbour Boat Works; launched on 19 August 1943, sponsored by Mrs. G. B. Waters; and commissioned at Morehead, North Carolina, on 2 June 1944.

== War service ==
Following brief shakedown training out of Norfolk, Virginia and Boston, Massachusetts, the net laying ship sailed on 11 August for the Pacific Ocean. She made stops at Guantánamo Bay, Cuba, the Panama Canal Zone, Manzanillo, Mexico; and San Diego. On 27 September, she reached Pearl Harbor and reported to Commander, Minecraft, Pacific Fleet, who assigned her to target towing and net defense duty.

On 24 January 1945, Abele left Pearl Harbor, bound for Iwo Jima. After sailing via Eniwetok and Guam with Task Group 51.5, the ship arrived off Iwo Jima on 20 February and began laying a torpedo net. She remained in the area for eight days laying nets and fleet moorings before getting underway on the 28th and heading for Saipan to prepare for the upcoming Okinawa invasion.

After a brief period spent in the Leyte Gulf staging area, Abele arrived off Kerama Retto on 26 March to begin laying net defenses. Although she was attacked by Japanese suicide boats and aircraft during the next seven weeks, she suffered no damage. On 18 April, the ship assisted in the downing of one enemy aircraft. On 12 May, she sailed to Nakagusuku Wan, Okinawa, and assisted in laying 5 mi (8.0 km) of heavy anti-torpedo nets across the harbor entrance. She also claimed credit for downing one Japanese "Val" on 11 June.

Abele was ordered to Tinian on 5 August to recover the anti-torpedo net located there. Following the formal Japanese surrender early in September, the ship got underway to return to the west coast of the United States. She reached San Francisco in late November. Abele was decommissioned on 1 March 1946, her name was struck from the Navy list on 28 March 1946, and the vessel was transferred to the Maritime Commission for disposal on 7 May 1947.

Abele won one battle star for her World War II service.

== Civilian service ==
Delivered to Great Lakes Lumber and Shipping Company, Fort William, Ontario, 29 April 1947, as Abele. At some point she was converted to a tug. Sold to Straits Towing Ltd., Vancouver, British Columbia, in 1953 and changing her name to Superior Straits in 1954. She was withdrawn from service with her engines removed in the 1960s, reducing her to a barge. In 1971 she was bought by P & B Towing Ltd., North Vancouver, British Columbia. Dubarry Investments Ltd., Vancouver, acquired her in 1973 until 2006.
