= HMS Precise =

British Royal Navy net laying ship active during World War 2

History

United Kingdom
- Name: HMS Precise (Z285)
- Builder: Barbour Boat Works; New Bern, North Carolina
- Laid down: 14 September 1943
- Launched: 20 July 1944
- Sponsored by: Mrs. H. W. Barbour
- Completed: 19 December 1944
- Acquired: 21 December 1944
- Fate: returned to U.S. Navy, 14 December 1945

History

United States
- Acquired: 14 December 1945
- Stricken: 28 March 1946
- Fate: transferred to the Maritime Commission, 10 April 1947, for disposal

General characteristics
- Class & type: Ailanthus-class net laying ship
- Displacement: 1,190 long tons (1,210 t) (full)
- Length: 194 ft 6 in (59.28 m)
- Beam: 37 ft (11 m)
- Draught: 13 ft 6 in (4.11 m)
- Propulsion: diesel electric, 2,500 hp (1,900 kW)
- Speed: 13 knots (24 km/h)
- Complement: 56
- Armament: 1 × 3"/50 caliber gun; 4 × twin 20 mm gun mounts

HMS Precise (Z285) was a net laying ship for the Royal Navy during the Second World War acquired from the United States Navy in December 1944 via Lend-Lease.

The ship was laid down as Boxelder (YN-80), a net tender of the Ailanthus class, on 14 September 1943 at Barbour Boat Works in New Bern, North Carolina. On 17 January 1944, while still under construction, the ship was reclassified as a net laying ship and redesignated AN-74. Boxelder was launched on 20 July and completed on 19 December.

After delivery to the U.S. Navy on 21 December, she was transferred to the United Kingdom under Lend-Lease the same day and commissioned into the Royal Navy as HMS Precise (Z285). Upon completion of wartime duty with the United Kingdom, she was returned to the U.S. Navy on 14 December 1945. Struck from the Naval Vessel Register on 28 March 1946, she was transferred to the United States Maritime Commission on 10 April 1947 and sold.
