= HMS Preventer =

History

United Kingdom
- Name: HMS Preventer (Z265)
- Builder: American Car and Foundry Co.; Wilmington, Delaware
- Laid down: 20 May 1943
- Launched: 9 August 1944
- Completed: 30 September 1944
- Acquired: 30 September 1944
- Fate: returned to U.S. Navy, 10 January 1946

History

United States
- Acquired: 10 January 1946
- Stricken: March 1946
- Fate: transferred to the Maritime Commission, 1 April 1947, for disposal

General characteristics
- Class & type: Ailanthus-class net laying ship
- Displacement: 1,190 long tons (1,210 t) (full)
- Length: 194 ft 6 in (59.28 m)
- Beam: 37 ft (11 m)
- Draught: 13 ft 6 in (4.11 m)
- Propulsion: diesel electric, 2,500 hp (1,900 kW)
- Speed: 13 knots (24 km/h)
- Complement: 56
- Armament: 1 × 3"/50 caliber gun; 4 × twin 20 mm gun mounts

HMS Preventer (Z265) was a net laying ship for the Royal Navy during the Second World War acquired from the United States Navy in September 1944 via Lend-Lease.

The ship was laid down as Seagrape (YN-90), a net tender of the Ailanthus class, on 20 May 1943 at the American Car and Foundry Co. in Wilmington, Delaware. On 17 January 1944, while still under construction, the ship was reclassified as a net laying ship and redesignated AN-77. Seagrape was launched on 9 August and completed on 30 September.

After delivery to the U.S. Navy on 30 September, she was transferred to the United Kingdom under Lend-Lease the same day and commissioned into the Royal Navy as HMS Preventer (Z265). Upon completion of wartime duty with the United Kingdom, she was returned to the U.S. Navy on 10 January 1946. Struck from the Naval Vessel Register in March 1946, she was transferred to the United States Maritime Commission on 1 April 1947.
