= USS Pinon =

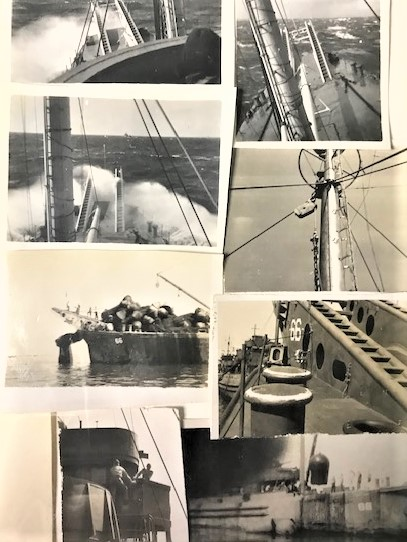

History

United States
- Name: USS Pinon
- Namesake: Any of a number of related pine trees with large, edible seeds
- Builder: American Car & Foundry, Wilmington, Delaware
- Laid down: 9 March 1943 as Pinon (YN-87)
- Launched: 16 January 1944
- Commissioned: 31 March 1944 as USS Pinon (AN-66)
- Decommissioned: 5 March 1946
- Reclassified: AN-66, 20 January 1944
- Stricken: 20 March 1946
- Home port: Tiburon, California
- Fate: Sold and placed in merchant service as Alaska Reefer, she was lost at sea 28 August 1961

General characteristics
- Class & type: Ailanthus-class net laying ship
- Displacement: 1,100 tons
- Length: 194 ft 6 in (59.28 m)
- Beam: 37 ft (11 m)
- Draft: 13 ft 6 in (4.11 m)
- Propulsion: diesel-electric, 2,500 hp, single propeller
- Speed: 12 knots
- Complement: 56 officers and enlisted
- Armament: one single 3 in (76 mm) dual purpose gun mount; two single 20 mm AA gun mounts

USS Pinon (AN-66/YN-87) was a Ailanthus-class net laying ship which was assigned to protect U.S. Navy ships and harbors during World War II with her anti-submarine nets.

== Constructed in Wilmington, Delaware ==
Pinon (AN-66), a net tender, was laid down 9 March 1943 by American Car and Foundry Company, Wilmington, Delaware, as YN–87; launched 16 January 1944; designated Pinon (AN-66) 20 January 1944; and commissioned 31 March 1944.

== World War II service ==
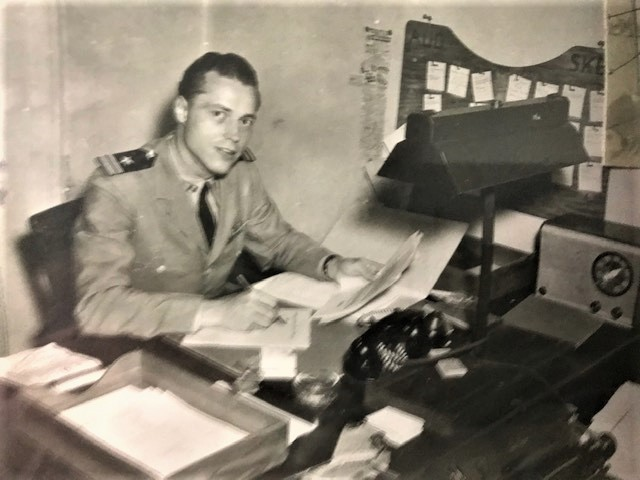
LT R.M. Dell, Commander of USS Pinon. at work in 1946.

After Atlantic coast shakedown and training, Pinon stood out of New York Harbor 24 June 1944 and steamed for Belfast, Northern Ireland, arriving 10 July. Pinon provided net-tending service in both Belfast and Plymouth, England, through the fall.

Departing Plymouth 6 November, she put in at Norfolk, Virginia 21 November through 10 December. She then underwent availability at Curtis Bay, Baltimore, Maryland, 11 December through 25 January 1945.

Pinon called at Hampton Roads, Virginia, 31 January and then cruised via Guantanamo Bay and the Panama Canal, reporting for duty to Commander, Pacific 13 February. After availability at San Diego, California, 19 March, she called at Pearl Harbor and thence tended nets at Eniwetok commencing 22 April, at Guam (27 April through 20 June), at Tinian/Saipan through the first week of July, and at Okinawa until 15 October.

== Post-war inactivation ==
Calling at Pearl Harbor 12 December, she pushed on to San Diego, California, arriving two days before Christmas. Pinon decommissioned at San Diego 5 March 1946, and was struck from the Navy List 20 March 1946. Sold and placed in merchant service as Alaska Reefer, she was lost at sea 28 August 1961.
