= HMS Prefect =

History

United Kingdom
- Name: HMS Prefect (Z263)
- Builder: American Car and Foundry Co.; Wilmington, Delaware
- Laid down: 1 April 1943
- Launched: 8 March 1944
- Completed: 3 June 1944
- Acquired: 3 June 1944
- Fate: returned to U.S. Navy, 28 December 1945

History

United States
- Acquired: 28 December 1945
- Stricken: 28 March 1946
- Fate: transferred to the Maritime Commission, 3 April 1947, for disposal

General characteristics
- Class & type: Ailanthus-class net laying ship
- Displacement: 1,190 long tons (1,210 t) (full)
- Length: 194 ft 6 in (59.28 m)
- Beam: 37 ft (11 m)
- Draught: 13 ft 6 in (4.11 m)
- Propulsion: diesel electric, 2,500 hp (1,900 kW)
- Speed: 13 knots (24 km/h)
- Complement: 56
- Armament: 1 × 3"/50 caliber gun; 4 × twin 20 mm gun mounts

HMS Prefect (Z263) was a net laying ship for the Royal Navy during the Second World War acquired from the United States Navy in June 1944 via Lend-Lease.

The ship was laid down as Prefect (YN-88), a net tender of the Ailanthus class, on 1 April 1943 at the American Car and Foundry Co. in Wilmington, Delaware. On 17 January 1944, while still under construction, the ship was reclassified as a net laying ship and redesignated AN-75. Prefect was launched on 8 March and completed on 3 June.

After delivery to the U.S. Navy on 3 June, she was transferred to the United Kingdom under Lend-Lease the same day and commissioned into the Royal Navy as HMS Prefect (Z263). Upon completion of wartime duty with the United Kingdom, she arrived at Norfolk, Virginia, on 22 October 1945 and was returned to the U.S. Navy on 28 December 1945. Struck from the Naval Vessel Register on 28 March 1946, she was transferred 3 April 1947 to the United States Maritime Commission and sold.
