= USS Chinaberry =

History

United States
- Name: USS Chinaberry
- Namesake: A tree of southern United States and Mexico
- Builder: Snow Shipyards, Inc., Rockland, Maine
- Laid down: date unknown
- Launched: 19 July 1943 in Rockland, Maine as YN-82
- Commissioned: 12 March 1944
- Decommissioned: 26 March 1946 at Mare Island Navy Yard, Vallejo, California
- Renamed: Chinaberry 20 January 1944
- Reclassified: AN-61, 20 January 1944
- Stricken: date unknown
- Fate: Sold 27 February 1950

General characteristics
- Class & type: Ailanthus-class net laying ship
- Displacement: 1,100 tons
- Length: 194 ft 6 in (59.28 m)
- Beam: 37 ft (11 m)
- Draft: 13 ft 6 in (4.11 m)
- Propulsion: diesel electric, 2,500hp
- Speed: 12 knots
- Complement: 56
- Armament: one single 3 in (76 mm) dual purpose gun mount; four twin 20 mm AA gun mounts

USS Chinaberry (AN-61/YN-82) was a Ailanthus-class net laying ship which served the United States Navy during World War II. Chinaberry operated in both the Atlantic Ocean and the Pacific Ocean before being decommissioned at war's end.

== Built in Maine ==
Chinaberry (AN-61) was launched 19 July 1943 by Snow Shipyards, Inc., Rockland, Maine, as YN-82; reclassified AN-61 and named Chinaberry 20 January 1944; and commissioned 12 March 1944.

== World War II service ==
=== Atlantic Ocean Theatre operations ===
Chinaberry sailed from New York City 24 June 1944 in a convoy bound for Belfast, Northern Ireland, arriving 10 July. She operated as net tender in European waters, principally off the coast of France until 12 December, when she cleared Plymouth, England in convoy for Charleston, South Carolina, arriving 6 February 1945. After overhaul she sailed 26 March for Narragansett Bay to conduct experimental net operations and to train pre-commissioning crews for net tenders.

=== Pacific Ocean operations ===
From New York City, Chinaberry sailed 11 May in convoy for the Panama Canal Zone, continuing independently for San Diego, California, San Francisco, and Pearl Harbor, arriving 28 June.

Between 19 July 1945 and 5 November, Chinaberry tended nets at Eniwetok.

== Post-war decommissioning ==
On 5 December, she arrived at San Pedro, Los Angeles, Chinaberry was decommissioned 26 March 1946 at Mare Island, California, and sold 27 February 1950.
