= USS Hoptree =

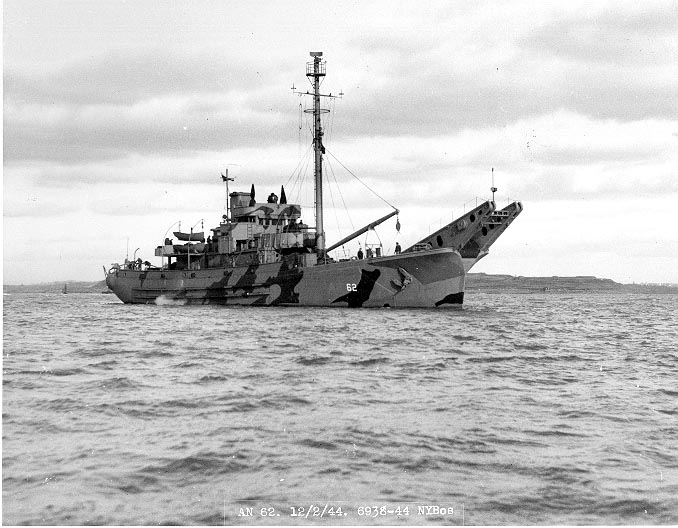

History

United States
- Name: USS Hoptree
- Namesake: A small American tree having two seeded winged fruits which have been used in place of hops
- Builder: Snow Shipyards Inc., Rockland, Maine
- Laid down: date unknown
- Launched: 14 October 1943 at Rockland, Maine as YN-83
- Sponsored by: Lt. Ann Jameson
- Commissioned: 18 May 1944
- Decommissioned: 1 March 1946
- Reclassified: AN-62, on 20 January 1944
- Stricken: 20 March 1946
- Fate: sold, delivered 23 April 1947 to new owner; scrapped in 1954

General characteristics
- Class & type: Ailanthus-class net laying ship
- Displacement: 1,100
- Length: 194 ft 6 in (59.28 m)
- Beam: 37 ft (11 m)
- Draft: 13 ft 6 in (4.11 m)
- Propulsion: diesel electric, 2,500hp
- Speed: 12 knots
- Complement: 56 officers and enlisted
- Armament: one single 3 in (76 mm) dual purpose gun mount; four twin 20 mm AA gun mounts
- Armor: wooden-hulled

USS Hoptree (AN-62/YN-83) was a Ailanthus-class net laying ship that served in the U.S. Navy during World War II. Hoptree performed her tour of duty in the Pacific Ocean and, post-war, she was decommissioned and sold.

== Built in Maine ==
Hoptree (AN-62), a wooden-hulled net layer, was launched on 14 October 1943 by Snow Shipyards Inc., Rockland, Maine, as YN-83; sponsored by Lt. Ann Jameson; reclassified AN-62, on 20 January 1944; and commissioned on 18 May 1944.

== World War II service ==
=== Pacific Ocean operations ===
Arriving at the Melville Net Depot for shakedown on 31 May 1944, Hoptree performed training and readiness operations until 27 June, when she joined the Net Layer Pre-commissioning and Training Group at Melville, Rhode Island. She then departed on 2 December for the U.S. West Coast and sailed on 3 February 1945 from the Naval Net Depot, Tiburon, California, for duty in the Pacific Ocean.

Hoptree arrived Pearl Harbor, Hawaii, on 13 February 1945 and was routed on to Eniwetok Atoll, where she arrived the 28th. From March through the end of the war the ship was engaged in the vital work of maintaining and repairing net defenses in the harbor, and after August she was occupied in dismantling them.

She sailed back to the United States in November 1945, arriving at San Francisco, California, on 8 November.

== Post-war decommissioning ==
Decommissioned on 1 March 1946, deemed surplus to Navy needs, and made available for disposal, Hoptree was stricken from the List of Naval Vessels on 20 March 1946.

== Subsequent maritime career ==
She was delivered to her purchaser, Van Camp Sea Food Company, San Pedro, California, on 23 April 1947. She operated on mercantile service until scrapped in 1954.
