= USS Catclaw =

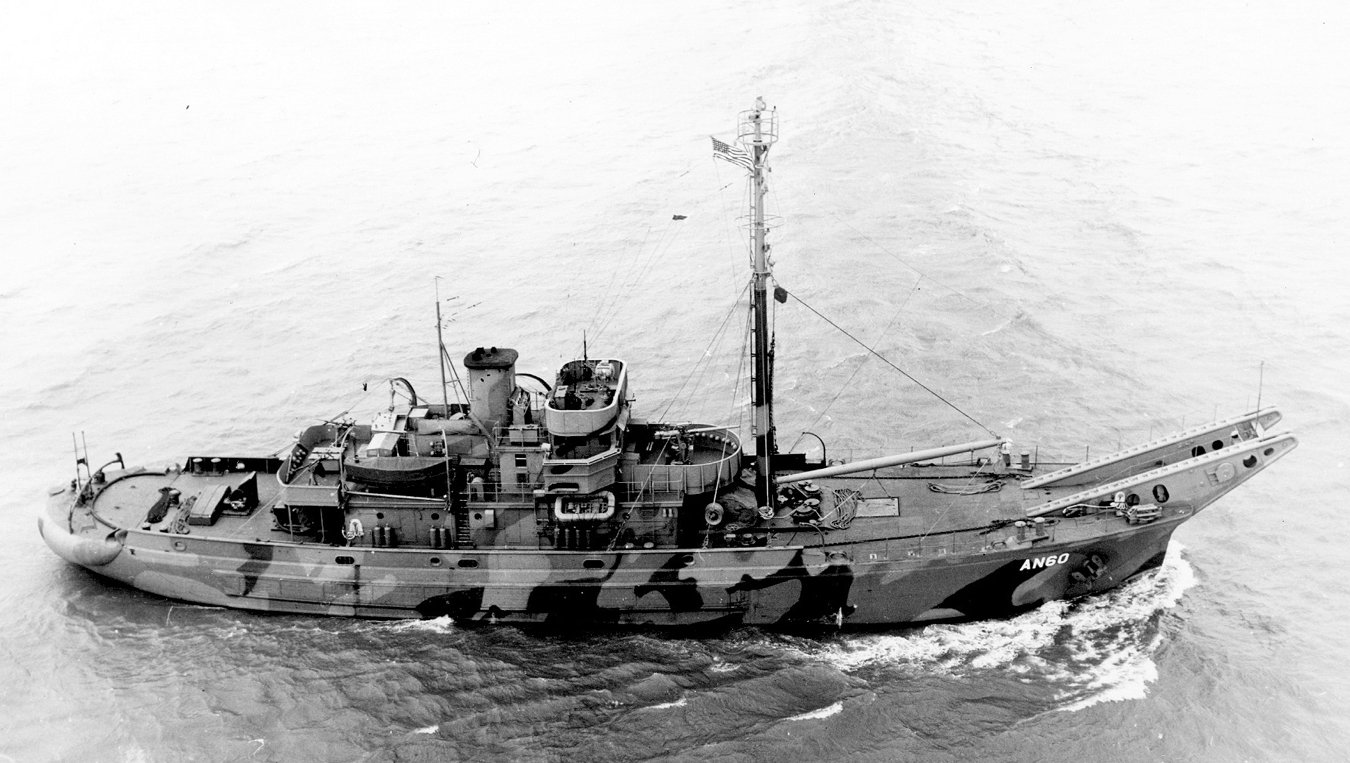
- Catclaw underway off Charleston, South Carolina, 13 February 1945

History

United States
- Name: USS Catclaw (YN-81)
- Namesake: Catclaw
- Builder: Snow Shipyards Inc., Rockland, Maine
- Launched: 22 May 1943
- Sponsored by: Mrs. F. R. Draper
- Commissioned: 14 January 1944
- Decommissioned: 19 April 1946, Shanghai, China
- Reclassified: AN-60, 20 January 1944
- Fate: transferred to the U.S. State Department for sale to the Republic of China; fate unknown

General characteristics
- Class & type: Ailanthus-class net laying ship
- Displacement: 1,100 tons
- Length: 194 ft 6 in (59.28 m)
- Beam: 37 ft (11 m)
- Draft: 13 ft 6 in (4.11 m)
- Propulsion: diesel electric, 2,500hp
- Speed: 12 knots (22 km/h)
- Complement: 56 officers and enlisted
- Armament: one single 3 in (76 mm) dual purpose gun mount; four twin 20 mm AA gun mounts

USS Catclaw (AN-60/YN-81) was an Ailanthus-class net laying ship which served with the U.S. Navy during World War II. Catclaw served in both the Atlantic Ocean and the Pacific Ocean theatres of the war. Post-war she was decommissioned in China, and transferred to the Republic of China.

== Constructed in Maine ==
Catclaw (YN-81) was launched 22 May 1943 by Snow Shipyards, Inc., Rockland, Maine; sponsored by Mrs. F. R. Draper: commissioned 14 January 1944 and reclassified AN-60 20 January 1944.

== World War II service ==
=== Atlantic Ocean operations ===
Catclaw reported at New London, Connecticut, 10 April 1944 to lay experimental underwater detection and sonar gear until 10 June. At Brooklyn Navy Yard, she was supplied with welding and diving equipment and had radar equipment installed.

Catclaw then sailed on 23 June for a month and a half of duty at Clyde, Scotland. On 20 August she arrived at Cherbourg, where she based until 14 September while laying moorings at Morlaix Roads for cargo ships bypassing the harbor at Brest.

Through November, she played an essential part in the huge task of clearing the harbor of Le Havre, and after a month of operations at Plymouth, England, sailed for Charleston, South Carolina, 9 January 1945, aiding in the escort of a group of disabled ships including LCT-421 which she took in tow.

=== Pacific Ocean operations ===
After overhaul, Catclaw sailed from Charleston 15 February 1945 for San Diego, California, to load nets for Pearl Harbor. Here she had duty from 27 March until 25 May, when she cleared for Eniwetok and Guam to deliver nets. After receiving a new propeller at Guam, she sailed to Saipan and Okinawa, where from 13 July to 8 September she conducted salvage operations.

From 10 September to 14 October, she laid harbor buoys and issued dry stores at Sasebo, then returned to Okinawa to load acoustic minesweeping equipment for use in Japanese waters. She operated to support minesweepers off northern Kyūshū through January 1946, then operated at Kobe until 14 March.

== Post-war decommissioning ==
Catclaw sailed then to Shanghai, where she was decommissioned 19 April 1946. The next day she was transferred to the U.S. Department of State for sale to the Republic of China.
