= USS Terebinth =

1943 Ailanthus-class net laying ship

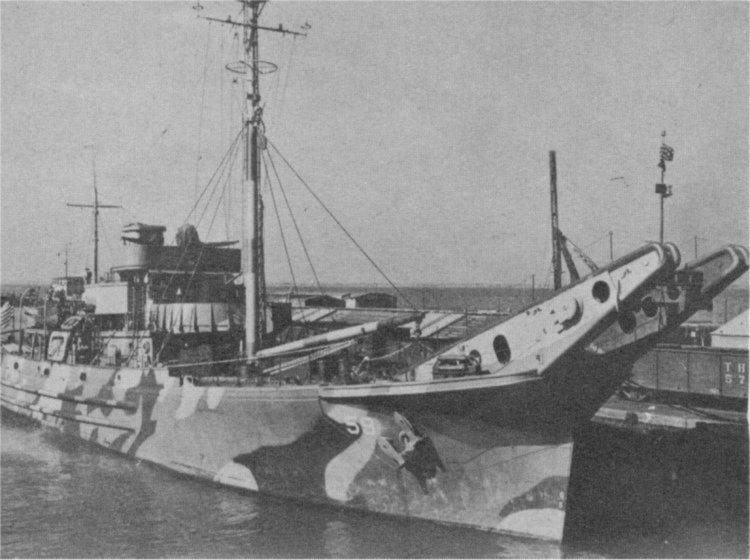
- USS TEREBINTH (AN-59)

History

United States
- Name: USS Terebinth
- Namesake: A small European tree of the Sumac family that yields Chian turpentine
- Builder: Barbour Boat Works, New Bern, North Carolina
- Laid down: as Balm (YN-78) on 24 March 1943
- Launched: 19 August 1943
- Sponsored by: Mrs. J. M. Mitchell
- Commissioned: 5 August 1944
- Decommissioned: 31 January 1946
- Renamed: Terebinth on 7 December 1943
- Reclassified: AN-59 on 20 January 1944
- Stricken: 26 February 1946
- Fate: Sold to Van Camp Sea Food Company, San Pedro, California, on 23 April 1946

General characteristics
- Class & type: Ailanthus-class net laying ship
- Displacement: 1,100 tons
- Length: 194 ft 6 in (59.3 m)
- Beam: 37 ft 0 in (11.3 m)
- Draft: 13 ft 6 in (4.1 m)
- Propulsion: diesel electric, 2,500 hp (1,900 kW)
- Speed: 12 knots (22 km/h; 14 mph)
- Complement: 56 officers and enlisted
- Armament: 1 × single 3 in (76 mm) dual purpose gun mount; 4 × twin 20 mm AA gun mounts

USS Terebinth (AN-59) – laid down as USS Balm (YN-78) – was a Ailanthus-class net laying ship which served with the U.S. Navy during World War II. Terebinth served in the Pacific Ocean theatre of operations and was awarded a battle star for her participation in the Okinawa campaign. Post-war she was decommissioned and sold.

== Constructed in North Carolina ==
Terebinth (AN-59) was laid down as Balm (YN-78) on 24 March 1943 at New Bern, North Carolina, by the Barbour Boat Works; launched on 19 August 1943; sponsored by Mrs. J. M. Mitchell; renamed Terebinth on 7 December 1943; redesignated AN-59 on 20 January 1944; and commissioned on 5 August 1944.

== World War II service ==
=== Assigned to the Pacific theatre ===
Terebinth departed Morehead City, North Carolina, on 6 August to complete fitting out at the Norfolk Navy Yard. On 24 August, the net laying ship steamed to Melville, Rhode Island, for shakedown training which she completed on 11 September. After operating in the 5th Naval District out of Norfolk, Virginia, for two months, the net layer got underway on 16 November for the U.S. West Coast. She transited the Panama Canal on 27 November and reached San Francisco, California, on 20 December 1944.

On 26 January 1945, Terebinth headed for Hawaii and arrived at Pearl Harbor on 7 February. The following week, the net layer joined a convoy which proceeded, via Johnston Island and Eniwetok, to Ulithi. She was there from 6 to 11 March when she joined units of Mine Squadron 10 bound for the Philippines. The ships arrived at San Pedro Bay 10 days later, prepared for the invasion of the Ryukyu Islands, and sortied on 19 March. They arrived off Kerama Retto on 26 March, and troops of the 77th Infantry Division landed on the beaches there at 0800 that morning.

By afternoon, the main islands of the group were under American control, and Terebinth began net laying operations in the Aka Shima channel. The northern mooring was completed in the afternoon, and the last of the 1,500-foot (457 m) net was in place before nightfall. The southern mooring was completed the next morning.

=== Terebinth survives attack ===
The invasion fleet came under enemy air attack on the first day of the campaign, and raids continued throughout the struggle for the island. A new hazard appeared on the morning of 28 March when lookouts on Terebinth sighted an unlighted boat approaching the ship's starboard bow. When challenged, the craft did not reply. Since the unidentified vessel was too close for Terebinth to bring her 3-inch gun to bear, the ship's gunners opened fire with small arms. The boat dropped a depth charge near Terebinth, veered to starboard, and sped off as a violent explosion shook the net layer. Terebinth was not damaged.

She then took station at the eastern side of the southern net entrance to Kerama Retto and directed traffic as it entered. The ship remained at this task until 6 April when she joined a salvage group off the Hagushi beaches to aid in retrieving landing craft. On 29 March, she went alongside the damaged USS Pinkney and supplied the transport with electricity for four days while it attended to the needs of wounded men who had been evacuated from the beaches. Terebinth remained in the Ryukyus until 6 July when she retired to Leyte.

=== End-of-war operations ===
Terebinth departed San Pedro, California, on 12 August and was approximately 60 miles (97 km) south of Peleliu on 15 August when she received orders to cease offensive operations against Japan. Two days later, she anchored at Ulithi and began repairing, replacing, and salvaging buoys and nets. She then moved to Kossol Roads in the Palaus to continue the same tasks. On 14 October, the net laying ship set course for Tanapag harbor, Saipan, with a load of nets. She arrived there on 19 October and got underway for the United States on 26 October.

== Post-war decommissioning ==
Terebinth arrived at San Diego on 27 November 1945 and, the next day, moved up the coast to San Pedro for inactivation. She was decommissioned on 31 January 1946 and struck from the Navy list on 26 February 1946. The ship was sold to Van Camp Sea Food Company, San Pedro, California, on 23 April 1946.

== Honors and awards ==
Terebinth received one battle star for her participation in the Okinawa campaign.
