= Almond (surname) =

Almond is a surname.

Notable people with the surname include:

- Barbara Almond (1938–2016), American psychiatrist and psychoanalyst
- Bob Almond (born 1967), American comic book inker
- Bobby Almond (born 1951), New Zealand footballer
- Brent Almond (born 1983), American film producer
- Cliff Almond (musician), American drummer and percussion player
- Cody Almond (born 1989), Canadian-born Swiss professional ice hockey centre
- Darren Almond (born 1971), English artist
- David Almond (born 1951), British writer
- Edward Almond (1892–1979), American military officer
- Gabriel Almond (1911–2002), American political scientist
- Hely Hutchinson Almond (1832–1903), Scottish physician and a politician
- Henry Almond (1850–1910), English football forward
- Harry Almond (1928–2004), British Olympic rower
- Hely Hutchinson Almond (1832–1903), Scottish physician and politician
- Ian Almond (born 1969), English literary scholar and writer
- J. Lindsay Almond (1898–1986), Governor of Virginia and Associate Judge of the U.S. Court of Customs and Patent Appeals
- Jack Almond (1876–?), English footballer
- James Almond (1874–1923), English footballer
- Jeanie Almond, American trap shooter
- Joan Almond (1935–2021), American photographer
- John Almond (disambiguation) – multiple people
- Jonathan Almond, American politician
- Lincoln Almond (1936–2022), American politician
- Louis Almond (born 1992), English football forward
- Marc Almond (born 1957), English vocalist and recording artist
- Mark Almond, British writer
- Mary Almond (1928–2015), English physicist, radio astronomer, palaeomagnetist, mathematician, and computer scientist
- Morris Almond (born 1985), American basketball player
- Oliver Almond, English Roman Catholic priest and writer
- Paul Almond (1931–2015), Canadian television and motion picture director and novelist
- Peter Almond, Australian judge
- Roy Almond (1891–1960), Australian rugby league player
- Shalom Almond, Australian filmmaker
- Steve Almond (born 1966), American author
- Willie Almond (1868–?), English footballer

== See also ==
- Philipp van Almonde, Dutch vice Admiral
- Almand (surname)
