= Almond (disambiguation) =

Almond is a tree in the family Rosaceae and the seed from that tree, but may also refer to:

== Plants ==
- Flowering almond, Prunus japonica, an ornamental shrub in family Rosaceae
- Desert almond, Prunus andersonii, a North American shrub in family Rosaceae
- Desert range or wild almond, Prunus fasciculata, North American shrub in family Rosaceae
- Indian or Tropical almond, Terminalia catappa in family Combretaceae
- Wild or Bitter almond, Brabejum stellatifolium, in family Proteaceae
- Almond potato, a potato variety

== Places ==
=== Antarctica ===
- The Almond, a rock formation

=== Canada ===
- Almond Village, Ontario

=== United Kingdom ===
- River Almond, Lothian (Scotland)
- River Almond, Perth and Kinross

=== United States ===
- Almond, Alabama, an unincorporated community
- Almond, New York, a town
  - Almond (village), New York, a village within the town
- Almond, North Carolina, an unincorporated community
- Almond, Wisconsin, a village
- Almond (town), Wisconsin, a town
- Almond Township, Minnesota

== People ==
- Almond (given name)
- Almond (surname)

== Other uses ==
- Almond (color), a color that is a creamy off-white brown
- Almond flavor
- HMT Almond, a Royal Navy Second World War trawler
- Almond, original name of USS Bitterbush, a US Navy World War II net laying ship
- Almond Elementary School (Los Altos, California)
- Toasted Almond, an amaretto cocktail; see Contents, Cocktails

== See also ==
- Almon (disambiguation)
