= List of Auction Hunters episodes =

Auction Hunters is an American reality television series that premiered on November 9, 2010, on Spike.

== Series overview ==
Season	Episodes	Originally aired	
Season	Episodes	First aired	Last aired
1	8	November 9, 2010	December 21, 2010
2	27	April 5, 2011	November 29, 2011
3	26	March 21, 2012	September 26, 2012
4	26	January 30, 2013	March 29, 2014
5	20	October 11, 2014	May 9, 2015

== Episodes ==
=== Season 1 (2010) ===
No. overall	No. in season	Title	Location	Original release date
1	1	"The Wild West"	San Bernardino, California	November 9, 2010
Ton and Allen head to auctions in the desert town of San Bernardino. Ton scores a deadly 19th century British Pepper-box handgun and tests it at the gun range. Allen wins a unit for $1 and finds a fully functional pre-WWI train set. Paid $376 Value $1,190 Profit $814
2	2	"The Big Score"	Downtown Los Angeles, California	November 9, 2010
Ton and Allen bid on units in downtown LA and uncover a ‘70s German H&K P7 pistol and a rare copper cash register. Paid $2,025 Value $5,850 Profit $3,825
3	3	"Ton's Got a Gun"	Mission Hills, California	November 16, 2010
Allen encounters some old rivals in the Valley. Ton and Allen uncover a Depression-era “Art Case” slot machine, a custom minibike and a Wild West 1880s Colt Peacemaker. Paid $1,900 Value $9,450 Profit $7,550
4	4	"Strat'ed for Cash"	West Adams, Los Angeles	November 23, 2010
Allen and Ton venture out to storage auctions in the heart of a mansion-lined Los Angeles neighborhood. Allen first discovers a vintage Maui Blue of ‘70s Fender Stratocaster. Later, the guys find a rare 1936 Schwinn Autocycle. Paid $975 Value $6,200 Profit $5,225
5	5	"The Real Thing"	Oxnard, California	November 30, 2010
In a small beachtown’s storage unit auction, Ton and Allen run into an old rival. They win a vintage GMC truck and also uncover one of the first upright coin-operated Coke vending machines. Paid $2,450 Value $9,400 Profit $6,950
6	6	"Weapons of Past Destruction"	Sunset Boulevard	December 7, 2010
Ton and Allen travel to Hollywood and uncover an arsenal of antique weapons: Civil War-era black powder muskets, ceremonial Masonic swords, a samurai sword, and a polygraph machine to boot. Paid $295 Value $1,635 Profit $1,340
7	7	"Gangster Whiskey"	Moreno Valley, California	December 14, 2010
A rare baseball card, a classic jukebox and an early model CD player are among items found by Allen and Ton in their auction wins. Paid $525 Value $2,800 Profit $2,275
8	8	"Home on the Gun Range"	Corona, California	December 21, 2010
A single unit auction yields a 1940s Kissometer arcade game, a 1901 Winchester 10 gauge shotgun and a seemingly antique crossbow. Paid $875 Value $3,400 Profit $2,425

=== Season 2 (2011) ===
No. overall	No. in season	Title	Location	Original release date
9	1	"Miami Heat"	Miami	April 5, 2011
A 1970s NASA countdown clock, a 1960s Delta relay rocket, and an all-terrain hovercraft are featured. Paid $2,800 Value $10,640 Profit $7,840
10	2	"Quadzilla Attacks!"	Playa Vista, Los Angeles	April 5, 2011
An 1880s Palm-Squeezer pistol, a Western Electric telephone from the 19th century and an ATV are examined. Paid $1,250 Value $4,990 Profit $3,740
11	3	"Sink or Swim"	Torrance, California	April 12, 2011
An 1897 Regina music box, an Addictor 190 mini boat and a Thomas Edison gramophone from 1905 are examined. Paid $1,725 Value $6,825 Profit $5,100
12	4	"Disco and Dice"	Fort Lauderdale, Florida	April 19, 2011
A 1978 pinball machine, a vintage Breathalyzer and an 1898 gambling device are featured. Paid $3,450 Value $10,600 Profit $7,150
13	5	"Labor of Love"	West Los Angeles	April 26, 2011
A Ms. Pac-Man arcade machine; a Harley-Davidson engine, 1958 frame and other motorcycle parts; and an Air Jordan vintage collection make Allen and Ton a good profit. Paid $950 Value $9,300 Profit $8,350
14	6	"The Chicago Grand Slam"	Chicago Heights, Illinois	May 3, 2011
A 1984 Yamaha SS440 snowmobile; a baseball signed by Hank Aaron; a toy Robby the Robot from the 1950s. Paid $1,050 Value $3,905 Profit $2,855
15	7	"The Chi-town Showdown"	Chicago	May 10, 2011
A Victorian-era metal casket; glass fire grenades from the 1870s; a Chicago fire alarm call box from 1896. Paid $1,000 Value $8,100 Profit $7,100
16	8	"Fire in the Hole!"	Rancho Cucamonga, California	May 17, 2011
An 1890s treasure chest with secret compartments; a dynamite detonator box from the 1930s; Ton forges bricks of silver by smelting jewelry. Paid $1,175 Value $6,150 Profit $4,975
17	9	"Animal Instincts"	Orange County, California	May 24, 2011
An 1897 Winchester pump-action shotgun and big-game taxidermy are among the valuable finds. Paid $2,700 including $500 in gun fees Value $9,600 Profit $6,840
18	10	"Everything's Bigger in Texas"	North Texas	May 31, 2011
Ton and Allen head 225 miles north of Dallas to the largest storage auction in the country: 800 containers that day. Their main competitor is a lookalike of George W. Bush, whom Allen nicknames "W". They buy 11 units, one of them a companion to one bought by W. A grandfather clock pendulum is traded to W in exchange for some firearms. They also find rare slot cars, antique crystal, and a large collection of firearms in immaculate condition. In this collection of firearms they find a high-end over/under Browning shotgun with a gold-plated trigger, an automatic .20 gauge. They talk to gun expert Jeanie Almond AKA "Mama Shotgun" about their find. This was the most profitable outing yet. Paid $2,975 Value $20,570 Profit $17,595
19	11	"The Smoking Ton"	Worcester, Massachusetts	July 17, 2011
The guys find an 1890 humidor, a gun barrel for a World War II-era M3 Stuart tank and an antique safe in Worcester, Massachusetts. Paid $1,875 Value $10,450 Profit $8,575
20	12	"Top Gun Ton"	Ontario, California	July 19, 2011
Ton and Allen buy two units. One contains a collection of vintage cameras, the other is full of radio control equipment, including two large airplanes. Ton crashes one of planes that the potential buyer values at $600, but the other, a top-of-the-line jet, goes for $9000. Paid $1,750 Value $10,825 Profit $8,475 (counting $600 lost due to crash)
21	13	"Beantown Bidders"	Boston	July 19, 2011
A 1940s–50s Schwinn tandem bicycle, assorted bicycle parts (one valued at $800), and a black powder bomb lance whaling gun from the 19th century are found in two units in Boston. Paid $975 Value $7,300 Profit $6,325
22	14	"Diesel Digs"	Los Angeles, California	August 2, 2011
In an industrial area of Los Angeles, the pair get a 1981 Bobcat 743 front loader, which they unload for $6,500, and a World War I trench mace. Paid $1,350 Value $8,575 Profit $7,225
23	15	"The Dallas Mavericks"	Dallas	August 9, 2011
The guys go to Dallas, where they find a handcrafted cowboy saddle and a working military cruise missile jet engine, which they sell for $8,500. Paid $2,150 Value $12,125 Profit $9,975
24	16	"Knuckle Dust"	Hollywood, California	August 16, 2011
The guys sell a 19th-century French "knuckle duster" (a gun, knife and brass knuckles all-in-one weapon) for $4,200, a George Rodrigue original trademark Blue Dog painting for $8,250, and various collectibles, including an autographed Raging Bull movie poster. Paid $1,050 Value $13,750 Profit $12,700
25	17	"Half Pipe Dreams"	Long Beach, California	August 23, 2011
The guys find a 1970s Z-Flex Jimmy Plumer Poolrider skateboard and a collection of bulletproof vests and ballistic SWAT helmets. Paid $1,400 Value $5,300 Profit $3,900
26	18	"Viva la Vegas"	Henderson, Nevada	August 30, 2011
The guys head to Las Vegas to acquire a Zig Zag magic sword box, 1910 poster of Chung Ling Soo, a 19th-century naval cane sword and German beer steins. Paid $320 Value $5,070 Profit $4,750
27	19	"Rodeo Ton"	Anaheim Hills, California	September 6, 2011
The guys head to Anaheim Hills, CA and discover a 1970s El Toro mechanical bull, WW II-era banjo; and a collection of 19th century handcrafted hunting duck decoys. Paid $1,100 Value $16,600 Profit $15,500
28	20	"Sin City Shootout"	Las Vegas, Nevada	September 13, 2011
The guys head to Las Vegas, NV and discover a bumper car designed to look like a 1953 Chevy, M16 rifle magazines, a photo booth and a set of potato guns. Paid $1,150 Value $13,750 Profit $12,600
29	21	"Night of the Digging Dead"	Oxnard, California	October 18, 2011
The guys head to Oxnard, CA and discover a 1940s embalming pump, one of the first electric bone saws and a custom-built shark cage. Paid $1,550 Value $9,680 Profit $8,130
30	22	"Battle Bought"	Whittier, California	October 25, 2011
The guys head to a container auction in Whittier, CA where they take on a former business partner of Allen. They discover a mint 19th century French harmonica pistol and a collection of 1990s remote controlled battle bots. Paid $1,200 Value $13,300 Profit $12,100
31	23	"Hot Wheels"	Palm Springs, California	November 1, 2011
The guys head to Palm Springs, CA and discover a 1970s sandrail and a 1965 replica Mustang pool table. Paid $440 Value $21,420 Profit $20,980
32	24	"Great American Cashtime"	San Diego, California	November 8, 2011
The guys head to San Diego and discover a 1950s pitching machine and a 1980s Jaws of Life tool. Paid $2,200 Value $5,840 (not including the $5,000 Jaws of Life) Profit $3,640
33	25	"Auction Hunters, Ink."	Los Angeles, California	November 15, 2011
The guys are back in LA and discover an autographed 1960s tattoo machine, a competition chainsaw and a six foot chainsaw-carved cedar bear. Paid $1,225 Value $13,415 Profit $12,190
34	26	"Reel Money"	San Diego, California	November 22, 2011
The guys travel to a container auction in San Diego discover a laser tag system used for military training and refurbish a 1970s Fighting Chair. Paid $800 Value $18,940 Profit $18,140
35	27	"Early Bird Special"	Stanton, California	November 29, 2011
The guys head to an early-morning auction in Stanton, CA and discover a vintage Shooting Star carnival game and a professional Mixed martial arts octagon fighting cage. Paid $800 Value $8,430 Profit $7,630

=== Season 3 (2012) ===
No. overall	No. in season	Title	Location	Original release date
36	1	"Auction Hunters Live"	Los Angeles, California	March 21, 2012
The guys head to an auction in Los Angeles for a live auction. They have one hour to buy one or more containers, and sell the contents to an already present group of buyers. After this one hour, Spike will double the money Ton and Allen make and donate this to the IAVA. The guys discover a 1930s Rickenbacker electric guitar, a replica Dr. J ABA basketball jersey, a 1980s boombox, a 1920s safe and a 17th-century wheellock gun. Paid $5,000 Value $12,200 Profit $7,200 Donated to the IAVA $25,000
37	2	"Cold Hard Cash"	Anchorage, Alaska	March 28, 2012
The guys head to Alaska and for a conex container auction discover two seaplane pontoons and a pair of revolvers: a .44 Magnum and a Smith & Wesson Model 500. Paid $1,725 Value $10,460 Profit $8,735
38	3	"Ton's Driller Instinct"	Wasilla, Alaska	March 28, 2012
The guys head to Wasilla and discover an ARGO 8x8 amphibious ATV and an air percussion hammer. Paid $1,690 Value $11,000 Profit $9,310
39	4	"Hidden Hot Wheels"	Covina, California	April 4, 2012
The guys head to Covina and discover a 1969 Chevrolet Chevelle Malibu muscle car and a World War II Liberator gun. Paid $1,350 Value $14,182 Profit $12,832
40	5	"Auction Hunter Shuffle"	Burbank, California	April 4, 2012
The guys head to Burbank and discover a 1940s Rock-Ola shuffleboard table and a racecar made out of a P-38 belly tank. Paid $1,200 Value $17,870 Profit $16,670
41	6	"Big Easy Money"	New Orleans	April 11, 2012
The guys head to New Orleans and discover a pair of early 19th-century flintlock duelling pistols and a vintage airboat. Paid $1,575 Value $12,430 Profit $10,855
42	7	"High Flying Ton"	Ventura, California	April 18, 2012
The guys head to a container auction in Ventura, CA and discover a basket and burners for a hot air balloon from 1984 and an 1880s German single-shot rifle. Paid $450 Value $12,940 Profit $12,490
43	8	"Drumming Up Cash"	Glendale, California	April 25, 2012
The guys head to Glendale, CA and discover a 1940s Zildjian cymbal and a PyroDigital controller for large-scale firework displays. Paid $1,150 Value $8,305 Profit $7,155
44	9	"Bowling Pin Payday"	Moreno Valley, California	May 2, 2012
The guys head to Moreno Valley, CA and discover an 1871 Snider-Enfield rifle with matching cutlass bayonet and a 1960s Brunswick pinsetter machine. Paid $1,225 Value $9,130 Profit $7,905
45	10	"Fake Punt Payoff"	Pasadena, California	May 9, 2012
The guys head to a container auction in Pasadena, CA and discover three first generation Segways and an enormous punt gun. Paid $600 Value $12,760 Profit $12,160
46	11	"The Jersey Score"	North Brunswick, New Jersey	May 16, 2012
The guys head to a silent auction in North Brunswick, NJ and discover a 1960s skeet throwing machine and a 1900s (decade) Brewster brougham. Paid $1,502 Value $9,860 Profit $8,358
47	12	"Allen's Got Balls"	Panorama City, California	May 23, 2012
The guys head to Panorama City, CA and discover a 1975 Kawasaki Mule 500 golf ball picker and a 19th-century M1851 Kammerlader made for the Swedish Navy. Paid $1,950 Value $10,050 Profit $8,100
48	13	"Mr. Haff Goes to Washington"	Washington, D.C.	May 30, 2012
The guys head to Washington, D.C. and discover three Krugerrands, a 1970s concrete pump and an 1863 Starr revolver. Paid $2,900 Value $11,840 Profit $8,940
49	14	"Voodoo Moola"	Baton Rouge, Louisiana	June 6, 2012
The guys head to Baton Rouge, LA and discover a 1900s (decade) barber chair and a pair of racing lawnmowers. Paid $470 Value $8,980 Profit $8,510
50	15	"Dead Aim"	Riverside, California	June 6, 2012
The guys head to Riverside, CA and discover a 19th-century cemetery gun and a monowheel. Paid $2,000 Value $8,780 Profit $6,780
51	16	"Sidecar Surprise"	Arlington, Virginia	June 20, 2012
The guys head to Arlington, VA and discover a reproduction falcon cannon and a 1965 Dnepr Russian military police motorcycle. Paid $1,500 Value $10,745 Profit $9,245
52	17	"Little-Ton Jones"	Littleton, Colorado	June 20, 2012
The guys head to Littleton, CO and discover an EIMCO Rocker Shovel Loader, Model 12B and a model rocket. Paid $1,175 Value $7,520 Profit $6,345
53	18	"Choo-Choo, Cha-Ching!"	Palmer, Alaska	August 8, 2012
Ton and Allen get a surprise second chance after nearly getting shut out in the small town of Palmer. They uncover a motorized railroad maintenance car from the 1960s and a pre-WWI Japanese semi-automatic pistol. Paid $1,000 Value $13,630 Profit $12,630
54	19	"Ton's Hot Commodity"	Reseda, California	August 15, 2012
Allen is late to the auction, leaving Ton to battle a feisty female auction buyer on his own. The guys find a fully functional flamethrower and a rare hand-carved bow and arrow set from South America. Paid $1,500 Value $9,130 Profit $7,630
55	20	"Ice, Ice, Baby"	Denver	August 22, 2012
Ton and Allen have to get aggressive when they encounter a towering opponent with a mountain of cash. The guys uncover a vintage ice resurfacing machine and an Olympic biathlon rifle. Paid $1,175 Value $8,025 Profit $6,850
56	21	"Gangs of New York"	New York City	August 29, 2012
Ton and Allen duke it out with a local thrift store gang at a Brooklyn storage auction. The guys discover a classic arcade redemption game and a mid-century water cannon designed to fight towering infernos. Paid $640 Value $7,250 Profit $6,610
57	22	"Allen’s Ruff Day"	Antelope Valley, California	August 29, 2012
Ton and Allen head to an auction in Ton’s hometown and end up battling with a big-mouthed buyer. They discover a pair of tranquilizer dart guns and also end up fighting with a K9. Paid $580 Value $7,150 Profit $6,570
58	23	"Hula Moola"	Honolulu	September 12, 2012
Ton and Allen jet to the Hawaiian islands where they’re joined by a feisty new female assistant. The team uncovers a pair of James Bond-style gadgets designed for high-speed underwater travel and a vintage sled used to race down the side of volcanoes in a death-defying Polynesian extreme sport. Paid $2,425 Value $12,200 Profit $9,775
59	24	"Friends In Hawaii Places"	Kailua, Hawaii	September 19, 2012
Allen & Ton enlist an assistant, Carolyn, and Allen’s Hawaiian buddy, Junior, to help them battle local buyers. The guys find a WWII-era motor scooter and a stash of antique Polynesian tattoo tools that get used on Ton. Paid $1,925 Value $9,152 Profit $7,227
60	25	"Money Makin' Monster Machines"	Westchester, California	September 26, 2012
The Auction Hunters team goes on the attack & ends up on a collision course with a hardened veteran auction buyer. They uncover a collection of speedy off-road vehicles and some hardcore heavy metal from the turn-of the-century. Paid $2,630 Value $9,202 Profit $6,572
61	26	"Gold ‘N’ Gloves"	Hermosa Beach, California	September 26, 2012
The Auction Hunters team goes toe-to-toe with Ton’s "evil twin". They find a medieval catapult designed for storming castles and Ton uncovers a hidden collection of gold bars worth thousands of dollars. Paid $950 Value $5,518 Profit $4,568

=== Season 4 (2013–14) ===
No. overall	No. in season	Title	Location	Original release date
62	1	"Once a Pawn a Time"	Covina, California	January 30, 2013
In this new chapter, Ton and Allen have opened a pawn shop and, up to their necks in debt, head to an auction in Covina where a call from Big Sis causes them to lose an upgraded quad. They visit an old friend to sell a box of old ammunition and a collection of football helmets turns out to be worth more than they seem. Paid $2,000 Value $19,000 Profit $17,000
63	2	"Win Lose Or Joust"	North Hills, Los Angeles	January 30, 2013
Ton and Allen race back from an auction to purchase a rare comic valued at over $100,000. The guys uncover a Samurai sword used for ritual suicide and Allen lives out his childhood fantasy of becoming a knight. Paid $ 1,050 Value $ 5,500 Profit $ 4,450
64	3	"It's Raining Ton"	Mission Hills, California	February 6, 2013
The guys take Big Sis to her first auction - and when things get ugly, she becomes their secret weapon. Ton tests out a "blob" and Allen gets shot with a riot gun. Paid $800 Value $5,950 Profit $5,150
65	4	"Rock-et To Me!"	Hollywood, California	February 13, 2013
Ton and Allen end up in a turf war at a Hollywood auction and at odds with each other over whether to gamble on what could be an antique slot machine. Allen attempts to fly a jetpack. Paid $2,000 Value $3,100 Profit $1,100
66	5	"Off The Deep End"	Catalina Island, California	February 20, 2013
Ton and Allen quarrel over bidding strategy at a rare auction on Catalina Island and must race against the clock to unload a one man submersible that could be worth big money... if they can make it work. Paid $2,350 Value $15,000 Profit $12,650
67	6	"Trading Places"	Costa Mesa, California	March 2, 2013
When an injury sidelines Allen, he stays at the shop while Ton takes Big Sis to the auction and goes rogue, ignoring Allen’s advice and making risky purchases that could lose the partners a boatload of cash. They uncover a land yacht and a fully automatic paintball machine gun. Paid $1,500 Value $4,200 Profit $2,700
68	7	"Flying Ton, Creeping Allen"	Chinatown, Los Angeles	March 9, 2013
When a group of thugs try to bully Ton and Allen out of a Chinatown auction, the guys fight back, leading to a violent showdown and the discovery of both a rare Bornean blowgun and special effects wire harnesses. Paid $3,000 Value $5,800 Profit $2,800
69	8	"Whip It Good"	Commerce, California	March 16, 2013
With a motocross bike and a rare stock whip up for grabs, Ton and Allen face one of their toughest competitors yet: their former employee Carolyn, who knows all their tricks, has money to burn and is out for revenge. Paid $1,300 Value $6,000 Profit $4,700
70	9	"Machine Gun Ton"	Pomona, California	March 23, 2013
Ton and Allen battle a pair of vicious female auction hunters who have an axe to grind and bid based on spite rather than strategy. And a gatling gun & suit of armor are worth much less than the guys expected. Paid $1,600 Value $9,300 Profit $7,700
71	10	"Always Money in Philadelphia"	Philadelphia	March 30, 2013
In Philadelphia, the guys face a shady bidder with inside information and former NFL star Vince Papale in a battle for a vintage football passing machine and a colonial musket that could be worth huge money...if it’s real. Paid $2,500 Value $15,000 Profit $12,500
72	11	"Carolyn Goes Topless"	Norwalk, California	April 6, 2013
A friendly competition with former employee Carolyn turns into a vicious battle for a 1968 Corvette Stingray, giving Carolyn the last laugh. Allen tests his Ninja skills with an antique sickle weapon. Paid $10,525 Value $18,500 Profit $7,975
73	12	"Don't Taze Me Bro"	Stanton, California	April 13, 2013
Two fierce opponents best Ton and Allen at the auction, leaving the duo in the lurch with a “trash unit” and little chance of breaking even for the day. And Ton gets tazed. Paid $5 Value $5,970 Profit $5,965
74	13	"The Fall Guys"	Reseda, Los Angeles	April 13, 2013
The pressures of running a shop are taking a toll on Ton and Allen and not even the discovery of a stunt-man's fall bag can ease the tension. When things get heated, Ton abandons the partnership and leaves town. Paid $4,000 Value $3,500 Profit $-500
75	14	"Separation Anxiety"	El Segundo, California	January 18, 2014
Allen takes out Elle his new partner to her first storage auction. Ton is still on indefinite leave and works on his truck in the desert with a childhood friend. Allen realizes that running the shop without Ton is tougher than he imagined. Paid $1,800 Value $4,000 Profit $2,200
76	15	"Allen vs. Ton"	Long Beach, California	January 25, 2014
Allen and Ton arrive at an auction separately, but a common enemy might cause them to join forces. Will the discovery of pro go-karts be the vehicle that brings them back together? Or is this the end of Haff Ton Pawn? Paid $3,500 Value $6,300 Profit $2,800
77	16	"You Got Served"	West Adams, Los Angeles	February 1, 2014
Ton and Allen head to auction while the shop employees throw an Appraisal Event. Both plans go bust and the guys hit a yard sale. Hopefully some antique racquets and a special effects box will be enough serve up a profit. Paid $1,515 Value $3,000 Profit $1,485
78	17	"Without a Chute"	Elysian Valley, Los Angeles	February 8, 2014
After a tough auction, things get worse when the shop’s landlord wants to talk to the guys. Ton tries to negotiate with him while Allen has to put an experimental powered parachute to the test to save the day’s profits. Paid $2,000 Value $14,300 Profit $12,300
79	18	"Ton Voyage"	Santa Barbara, California	February 15, 2014
When a ruthless storeowner seems hell-bent on stopping Ton & Allen from scoring new items in Santa Barbara they fight back. The guys uncover a rare antique air-gun and a vintage wooden boat built for speed, if it floats! Paid $11,900 Value $25,500 Profit $13,600
80	19	"You Foos You Lose"	West Los Angeles	February 22, 2014
When their truck breaks down, Ton and Allen lay it all on the line to raise money to fix her. They score a Foosball table, Tommy Gun drums and to Ton’s delight, a treasure trove of Twinkies, but will it be enough? Paid $925 Value $1,950 Profit $1,025
81	20	"Allen's Big Crush"	Mission Hills, California	March 1, 2014
The guys battle it out with their fierce former-employee, while a shill bidder threatens to ruin the day. When all hope seems lost, a set of monster truck tires and a mystery box are their last chance to come out on top. Paid $2,463 Value $6,200 Profit $3,737
82	21	"Nothing But Net"	Santa Clarita, California	March 15, 2014
Ton and Allen face their toughest challenge yet when two old rivals join forces. The guys dig up an off-road motorcycle and a pair of net guns, while the staff clashes with mystery shoppers back at Haff Ton Pawn. Paid $1,450 Value $10,550 Profit $9,100
83	22	"Hall of Fame Game"	Hawthorne, California	March 22, 2014
Allen heads to an auction with Elle, while Ton and Big Sis revamp the shop to help bring in more customers. Allen unearths a Ouija board and a set of antique basketballs, and goes toe-to-toe with an NBA Hall of Famer. Paid $2,600 Value $5,650 Profit $3,050
84	23	"Cashville, Tennessee"	Nashville, Tennessee	March 29, 2014
Ton and Allen hit the road for Nashville, where they rumble with a band of tough, high-bidding bikers. The day explodes when the guys discover a 37 millimeter anti-tank gun and a cowboy’s rodeo saddle. Paid $12,800 ($3,000 for the travel) Value $13,375 Profit $-2,425
85	24	"Big Sis Ducks Out"	Long Beach, California	March 29, 2014
Big Sis delivers some bad news at an auction in Long Beach. Then, Ton and Allen discover a tomahawk, a dunk tank and a rare firearm. Paid $1,800 Value $3,700 Profit $1,900
86	25	"Gone In 20 Seconds"	Commerce, California	April 5, 2014
Ton and Allen get taken down by a fierce opponent, but a twist of fate keeps them in the game. Uncovered items include a Geiger counter and some NASCAR tools. Paid $2,100 Value $4,200 Profit $2,100
87	26	"To Pawn or Not To Pawn"	Covina, California	April 5, 2014
Ton and Allen face off against Carolyn, and find a special-effects machine used for stunt work. Then, the guys decide the fate of the shop. Paid $1,300 Value $6,500 Profit $5,200

=== Season 5 (2014–15) ===
No. overall	No. in season	Title	Location	Original release date
88	1	"Space Cowboys"	Santa Clarita, California	October 11, 2014
In the Season 5 premiere, Ton and Allen start the next chapter of their careers by uncovering a WWII firearm and a cosmonaut space suit. Paid $3,300 Value $22,200 Profit $18,900
89	2	"Ramped Up"	Compton, California	October 18, 2014
The guys go head-to-head with Carolyn as Ton battles a bad back. When negotiations to sell a stunt ramp hit a rough patch, Allen faces a tough decision. Paid $1,000 Value $2,900 Profit $1,900
90	3	"Hook, Line and Printer"	Norwalk, California	October 25, 2014
A last-minute auction proves challenging as the guys go up against a cowboy couple and come away with a 3D printer and a grappling-hook gun. Paid $1,451 Value $6,150 Profit $4,699
91	4	"Rock and Roll"	Whittier, California	November 1, 2014
An auction turns tough when a buyer tries to take it all. After some losses, the guys emerge with a state-of-the-art food truck and an off-road rock crawler. Paid $8,000 Value $17,000 Profit $9,000
92	5	"Betsy's Last Stand"	Chatsworth, California	November 8, 2014
The guys hope to save their beloved bread truck as they visit an auction and find an industrial grinder and a classic Chevy. Paid $5,500 Value $14,250 Profit $8,750
93	6	"Risk & Reward"	Mission Hills, California	November 22, 2014
The guys arrive late to an auction and uncover vintage bear traps and a collection of street art possibly belonging to graffiti artist RISK. Paid $410 Value $61,550 Profit $61,140
94	7	"Blazing Saddles"	Hollywood, California	December 6, 2014
The guys head to Hollywood for an auction and face a new competitor with a seemingly endless cash flow. After they find a triple-barrel shotgun and an antique camel saddle, Allen confronts a childhood fear. Paid $1,300 Value $3,150 Profit $1,850
95	8	"Party Gras"	New Orleans	December 13, 2014
Ton and Allen hit New Orleans, where they battle locals at a tough auction and wind up with the contents of a Mardi Gras unit. Paid $700 Value $14,000 Profit $13,300
96	9	"Louisiana Purchase"	Louisiana	December 20, 2014
In Louisiana, Ton and Allen meet some salty locals at a shipping-crate auction, then land a bass-fishing boat at a boat auction Paid $16,500 Value $32,800 Profit $16,300
97	10	"Missouri Loves Company"	Missouri	December 20, 2014
The guys visit Ton's sister in Missouri for some rafting and relaxation, but they also check out a fast-paced live auction, where they score a ballista and an anvil set. Paid $3,525 Value $6,500 Profit $2,975
98	11	"Tough as Nails"	Mission Hills, California	April 11, 2015
CJ seeks to disrupt Allen's search for serenity at a storage auction. Then, the guys head to a live auction where they uncover an unusual Marilyn Monroe statue, an industrial water slide and a bed of nails. Paid $3,350 Value $5,800 Profit $2,450
99	12	"Ton-Geons & Dragons"	Covina, California	April 11, 2015
Ton works on their new truck as Allen heads to an auction where he finds a sword collection and some falconry gear. Paid $700 Value $4,150 Profit $3,450
100	13	"Wreck-Shaw"	Santa Clarita, California	April 18, 2015
A weekend auction sees the guys go up against some newbie buyers for a rickshaw, a wrecking ball and blast detonators. Paid $3,500 including $600 on the wrecking-ball Value $5,400 Profit $1,900
101	14	"Carnies & Armories"	N/A	April 18, 2015
A tough group of bidders team up to take down Ton and Allen at an auction. After a couple of wins, the guys try to sell a Native American arsenal and some vintage carnival gear. Paid $1,750 Value $10,700 Profit $8,950
102	15	"The Unsinkable Ton"	Stanton, California	April 25, 2015
The guys try to authenticate props from the movie "Titanic"; Ton faces off with a rattlesnake during a snakebite-kit sale; Allen carves up some ice while selling chainsaws. Paid $2,700 Value $5,800 Profit $3,100
103	16	"Pucks for Bucks"	Torrance, California	April 25, 2015
Glassblowing tools, autographed baseballs and a hockey-puck launcher are among the finds when the guys get stuck sorting through a unit they didn't want. Paid $420 Value $11,720 Profit $11,300
104	17	"Whiskey Business"	Lake View Terrace, California	May 2, 2015
The guys find RC race boats and a unit filled with whiskey at an auction in Allen's old stomping grounds. Paid $1,950 Value $9,700 Profit $7,750
105	18	"Haff-Inated"	Valencia, California	May 2, 2015
Allen misses his morning coffee, but he's rejuvenated by the discovery of a wrestling ring and some vintage animatronics. Paid $5,600 Value $41,900 Profit $36,300
106	19	"Brew-Phoria"	Mission Hills, California	May 9, 2015
The guys go all-in for an electric car, then hope to pay for its overhaul with a brewing system and some high-end air rifles. Paid $15,000 including $8,000 on the car restoration Value $26,200 Profit $11,200
107	20	"Catch My Drift?"	Norwalk, California	May 9, 2015
The guys land a custom drift car and a luxury-antiques unit that could hold a one-of-a-kind pistol. Paid $14,900 Value $61,000 Profit $46,100
