= Almond (given name) =

Almond is a given name of the following people:

- Almond Chu (born 1962), Hong Kong–based artist and photographer
- Almond E. Fisher (1913–1982), United States Army officer
- Almond Lee (born 1964), Hong Kong–based horse trainer
- Almond Richards (1911–1992), Australian rules footballer
- Almond Vosotros (born 1990), Filipino basketball player
- Edgar Almond Wells (1908–1995), Methodist missionary in northern Australia
