= The Almond Tree =

The Almond Tree may refer to:

- "The Almond Tree", a German fairy tale collected by the Brothers Grimm, more usually known as "The Juniper Tree" (fairy tale)
- The Almond Tree (John Ireland), a piece for piano solo of 1913 by John Ireland (1879–1962)

== See also ==
- Almond (disambiguation)
