= USS Ailanthus =

Net laying ship

Coordinates: 51.669°N 178.047°W

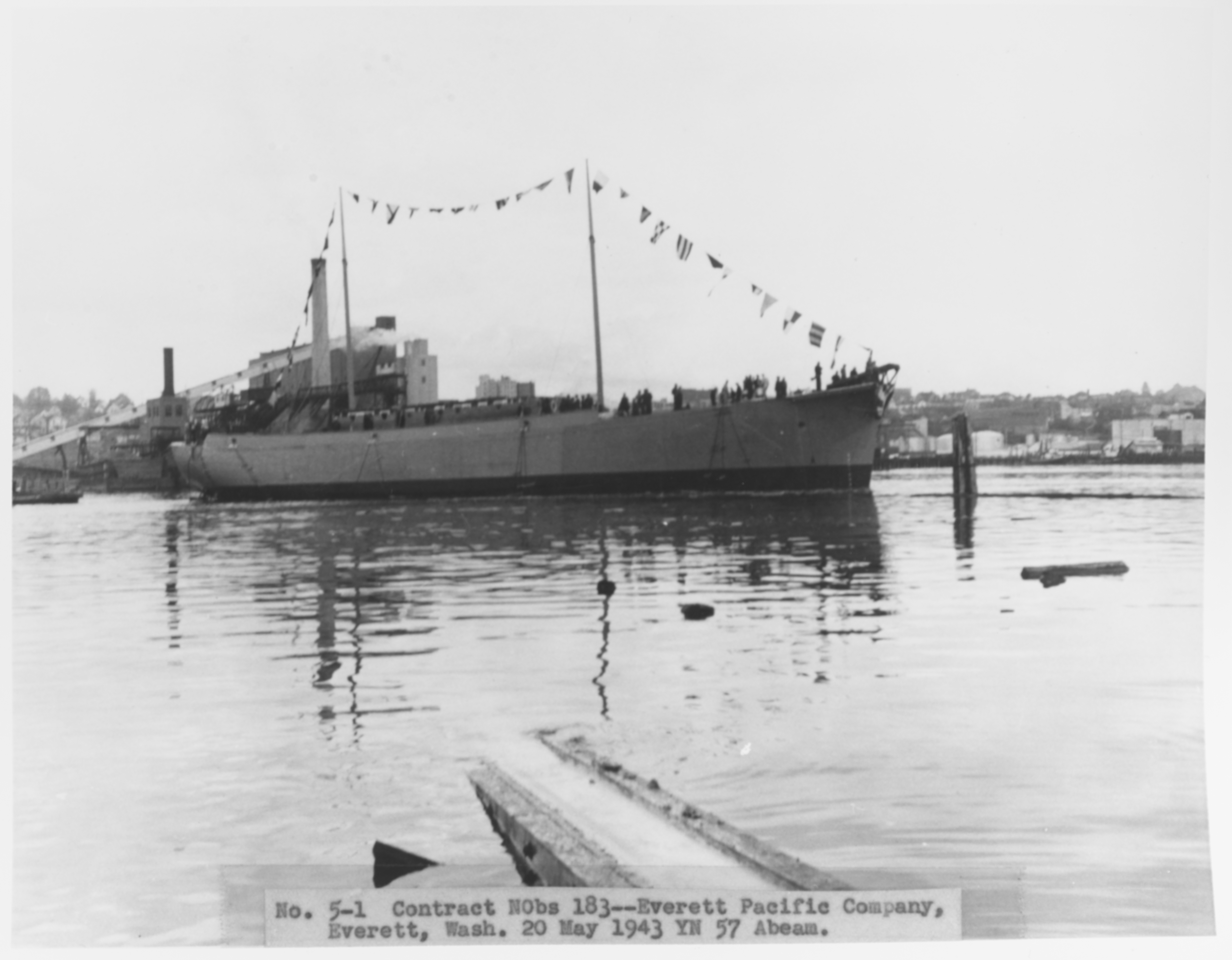
- USS Ailanthus (YN-57) launching at Everett-Pacific Shipbuilding and Dry Dock Co., Everett, WA., 20 May 1943

History

United States
- Name: USS Ailanthus (AN-38)
- Namesake: Ailanthus
- Builder: Everett-Pacific Shipbuilding & Dry Dock Company, Everett, Washington
- Laid down: 17 November 1942 as YN-57
- Launched: 20 May 1943
- Sponsored by: Miss Billie Jean McNatt
- Commissioned: 2 December 1943 as USS Ailanthus (YN-57)
- In service: 6 months
- Reclassified: AN-38, 20 January 1944
- Stricken: 9 June 1944
- Fate: Grounded and declared a total loss.

General characteristics
- Class & type: Ailanthus-class net laying ship
- Displacement: 1,190 long tons (1,209 t)
- Length: 194 ft 7 in (59.31 m)
- Beam: 34 ft 7 in (10.54 m)
- Draft: 11 ft 8 in (3.56 m)
- Propulsion: Diesel-electric, 2,500 hp (1,864 kW), single propeller
- Speed: 17 knots (20 mph; 31 km/h)
- Complement: 56 officers and enlisted
- Armament: 1 × 3"/50 caliber gun; 4 × twin 20 mm guns

USS Ailanthus (AN-38/YN-57) was an Ailanthus-class net laying ship which served with the U.S. Navy in the western Pacific Ocean theatre of operations during World War II. She was assigned to the U.S. Pacific Fleet with her protective anti-submarine nets. She ran aground at Lash bay, Tanaga Island in the Aleutians 26 February 1944 and was declared a total loss. She was only six months old. Seabees of Naval Construction Battalion 45 assisted the ship's crew evacuate safely.

== Built in Washington ==
Ailanthus (YN-57) was laid down on 17 November 1942 at Everett, Washington, by the Everett-Pacific Shipbuilding & Dry Dock Company; launched on 20 May 1943; sponsored by Miss Billie Jean McNatt; and placed in commission at Seattle, Washington, on 2 December 1943.

== World War II service ==
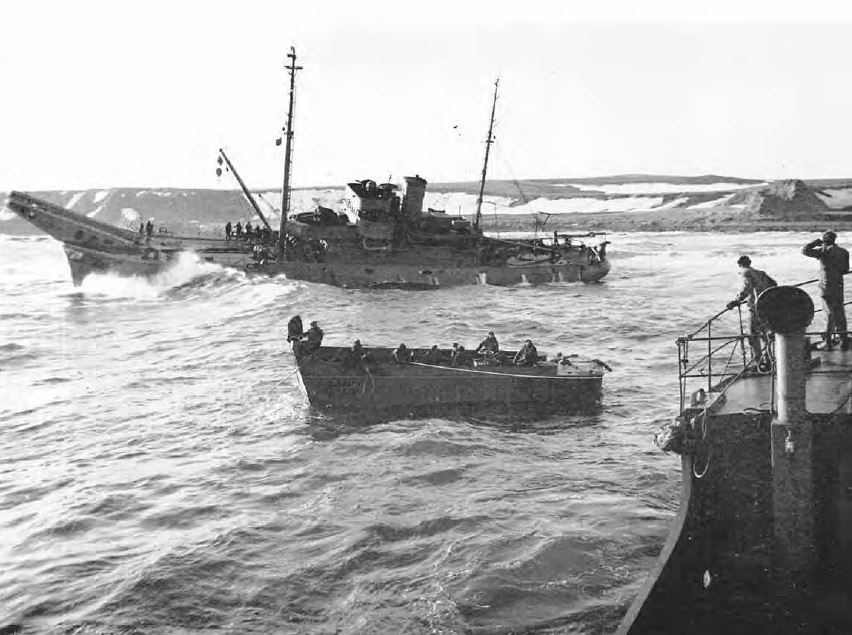
USS Ailanthus rescue by Naval Construction Battalion 45 on Tanaga Island in the Aleutians.

The net tender completed fitting out and, during the second half of December, conducted shakedown training. On the last day of 1943, she reported for duty in the 13th Naval District. On 20 January 1944, she was reclassified a net laying ship and redesignated AN-38.

Early in February, Ailanthus moved north to Pleasant Island, Alaska, where she arrived on 4 February. Reassigned that same day to Service Squadron 6, U.S. Pacific Fleet, she began to carry out net laying duties.

However, her career proved very brief. Having delivered a cargo of perforated steel plating (Marston Mat) to a Navy Seabee contingent building an airfield on the westernmost island of Attu, Ailanthus was caught in a violent winter storm, and on 26 February 1944, slipped her anchorage and was driven hard aground, suffering extensive damage. While still stranded, Ailanthus was reassigned to the newly constituted 17th Naval District (the Alaskan portion of the old 13th Naval District to which she had originally been assigned). Finally, she was declared a total loss, and her name was struck from the Navy List on 9 June 1944.
