= USS Canotia =

Naval ship

History

United States
- Name: USS Canotia
- Namesake: A tree of the bittersweet family
- Builder: Everett-Pacific Shipbuilding & Dry Dock Company, Everett, Washington
- Laid down: as Canotia (YN-66)
- Launched: 4 July 1944
- Sponsored by: Mrs. F. Schmitz
- Commissioned: 31 July 1944 as USS Canotia (AN-47)
- Decommissioned: 18 February 1946, at San Diego, California
- Reclassified: AN-47, 20 January 1944
- Stricken: date unknown
- Fate: Sold, 21 April 1947, fate unknown

General characteristics
- Class & type: Ailanthus-class net laying ship
- Tonnage: 1,100 tons
- Length: 194 ft 7 in (59.31 m)
- Beam: 37 ft (11 m)
- Draft: 13 ft 6 in (4.11 m)
- Propulsion: Diesel-electric, 2,500 hp (1,864 kW)
- Speed: 12.1 knots (13.9 mph; 22.4 km/h)
- Complement: 56 officers and enlisted
- Armament: 1 × 3"/50 caliber gun; 2 × 20 mm guns

Service record
- Operations: World War II
- Awards: 1 battle star

USS Canotia (AN-47/YN-66) was an Ailanthus-class net laying ship which served with the U.S. Navy in the South Pacific Ocean theatre of operations during World War II. Her career was without major incident, and she returned home after the war bearing one battle star to her credit.

== Constructed in Everett, Washington ==
Canotia (AN-47) was launched 4 July 1944 by Everett-Pacific Shipbuilding & Dry Dock Company, Everett, Washington; sponsored by Mrs. F. Schmitz; commissioned 31 July 1944 and reported to the U.S. Pacific Fleet.

== World War II service ==
=== Pacific Ocean operations ===
Canotia departed San Francisco, California, 6 October 1944 for Pearl Harbor, where she arrived 16 October. She provided target service to ships training at this great base until 5 February 1945, when she was outward bound for action waters.

Arriving at Eniwetok 15 February, she reported for duty with the U.S. 5th Fleet, and sailed to Iwo Jima, where she had mooring and salvage duty from 28 February to 12 April. The first portion of this duty came as bitter action raged ashore, and enemy air attacks still menaced American shipping.

=== End-of-war operations ===
After routine repairs at Guam, Canotia arrived at Ulithi 14 June to install and maintain nets. After the Japanese surrender, Canotia cruised the small islands of the western Caroline Islands searching for American and Allied ex-prisoners of war, or Japanese soldiers.

She received the surrender of the garrison on Lamotrek, and destroyed a Japanese supply dump on Olimarao. Between 23 September and 1 October, she removed net defenses at Ulithi and Kossol Roads.

== Post-war decommissioning ==
On 26 October, cleared for San Diego, California, where she was decommissioned 18 February 1946, and sold 21 April 1947.

== Honors and awards ==
Canotia received one battle star for World War II service.
