= USS Anaqua =

History

United States
- Name: USS Anaqua
- Namesake: Ehretia anacua, a fruit-bearing tree or shrub native to Mexico and southwestern Texas
- Builder: Everett-Pacific Shipbuilding & Dry Dock Company, Everett, Washington
- Laid down: 16 December 1942 as Anaqua (YN-59)
- Launched: 16 August 1943
- Sponsored by: Miss Marian Swalwell
- Commissioned: 21 February 1944 as USS Anaqua (AN-40)
- Decommissioned: 7 February 1946, at San Pedro, California
- Reclassified: AN-40, 20 January 1944
- Stricken: 26 February 1946
- Fate: Sold on 6 March 1946 to Mr. Robert J. Heffner, Santa Ana, California

General characteristics
- Class & type: Ailanthus-class net laying ship
- Displacement: 1,190 long tons (1,209 t)
- Length: 194 ft 7 in (59.31 m)
- Beam: 34 ft 7 in (10.54 m)
- Draft: 11 ft 8 in (3.56 m)
- Propulsion: Diesel-electric, 2,500 hp (1,864 kW), single propeller
- Speed: 12.1 knots (13.9 mph; 22.4 km/h)
- Complement: 56 officers and enlisted
- Armament: 1 × 3"/50 caliber gun; 4 × twin 20 mm guns

USS Anaqua (AN-40/YN-59) was an Ailanthus-class net laying ship which served with the United States Navy in the Western Pacific Theater of Operations during World War II. She served the U.S. Pacific Fleet with her protective anti-submarine nets, and returned home safely after the war.

== Built in Washington ==
YN-59 was laid down on 16 December 1942 at Everett, Washington, by the Everett-Pacific Shipbuilding & Dry Dock Company; launched on 16 August 1943; sponsored by Miss Marian Swalwell; redesignated AN-40 and named Anaqua on 20 January 1944; and placed in commission on 21 February 1944.

== World War II service ==
=== Service in the frigid North Pacific ===
After conducting shakedown training in Puget Sound, the net laying ship got underway for Alaska and reached Dutch Harbor on 20 May. She then began her assignment of tending nets in waters off Alaska and the Aleutian Islands. On 16 October, while the ship was hauling net gear from Cold Bay to Dutch Harbor, she encountered a severe storm with high winds. The damage Anaqua sustained was so extensive that she was ordered to return to the United States for availability.

The battered vessel arrived at Seattle, Washington, on 20 December and entered drydock at the Lake Washington Shipyard, Kirkland, Washington. Upon completion of the repairs, she got underway on 5 February 1945 for the Naval Net Depot, Tiburon, California. While en route to that port, she encountered a storm off the coast of Oregon. The ship sprung numerous leaks through the main deck and the boat deck. Moreover, several electrical fires broke out and caused considerable damage. Upon her arrival at Tiburon, the ship was sent to the Martinolich Shipyard in San Francisco for repairs to her new damage.

=== Assigned to the western Pacific ===
On 11 March, Anaqua again stood out to sea and arrived back at Tiburon safely and took on a load of amphibious gear before sailing for Pearl Harbor, Hawaii. During her voyage across the eastern Pacific, the ship experienced several steering engine failures. She reached Pearl Harbor on 26 March, unloaded her net gear, and entered a drydock at the Pearl Harbor Navy Yard where, in addition to repair of her steering system, her hull was re-caulked to eliminate persistent leaks.

Anaqua resumed operations late in May, took on a cargo, and, on 25 May, sailed for the Mariana Islands. After a brief stop en route at Eniwetok, the net tender reached Guam on 16 June, discharged her cargo, and then proceeded to Tinian to lay gasoline tanker moorings. She completed this job on 22 June and sailed on to Ulithi. She arrived there on the 26th and spent the next four months in the lagoon of that atoll maintaining anti-torpedo nets in conjunction with five other net tenders. This duty was interrupted briefly by a trip to Yap Island following the surrender of Japan to load Japanese ordnance gear for transportation back to Ulithi.

=== End-of-war operations ===
Following her return to the atoll, Anaqua assisted in closing down the large fleet anchorage at Ulithi. The vessel helped remove 20 miles (32 km) of anti-torpedo net. This salvage work was completed by 17 October, when she headed home with a barge in tow. The ship paused at Saipan to unload nets being transported by the barge and then proceeded to Hawaii. During this passage, rough seas and inclement weather slowed her progress, and Anaqua headed for Midway Islands to refuel. The vessel finally reached Pearl Harbor on 12 November.

The net tender left Hawaii on the 16th and reached San Diego, California, on 25 November. Shortly thereafter, she sailed to San Pedro, California, where preparations to deactivate the ship began.

== Post-war decommissioning ==
Anaqua was decommissioned at San Pedro on 7 February 1946, and her name was struck from the Naval Vessel Register on 26 February 1946. The ship was sold on 6 March 1946 to Mr. Robert J. Heffner, Santa Ana, California.
