= Everett-Pacific Shipbuilding & Dry Dock Company =

American shipbuilding company in World War II

Coordinates: 47.98678°N 122.22115°W

- Company type: Ship Construction
- Industry: Engineering; Construction
- Founded: 1942
- Founder: William Pigott Jr.; Paul Pigott
- Headquarters: Port Gardner Bay in Everett, Washington
- Products: Ships and barges

Everett-Pacific Shipbuilding & Dry Dock Company was established in 1942 to build ships needed for World War II. Yard construction began on 1 March 1942. As part of the Emergency Shipbuilding Program, the US Navy provided some of the capital to start Everett-Pacific Shipbuilding at Port Gardner Bay in Everett, Washington. Everett-Pacific was sold in 1945 to the Pacific Car and Foundry, who was already a major manufacturer of railcars and trucks. Pacific Car and Foundry was building barges for the US Navy during World War II at plants in Renton, Seattle and Tacoma in the state of Washington. The lease for the shipyard in Everett, Washington ended in 1949 and the yard closed. Pacific Car and Foundry in 1972 changed its name to Paccar Inc. to reflect its major products. The Everett-Pacific shipyard site later became part of Western Gear, a heavy machinery manufacturer. From 1987 to 1992, the shipyard was rebuilt to become part of Naval Station Everett. Everett-Pacific Shipbuilding was started by William Pigott Jr. a Seattle businessmen and his brother Paul Pigott (1900-1961). William Pigott Jr. was born on 26 Aug. 1895 in Pueblo, CO and died on 8 July 1947 in San Francisco, CA.

== Some of the ships built by Everett-Pacific ==
=== Large Auxiliary Floating Dry Docks (AFDB) ===
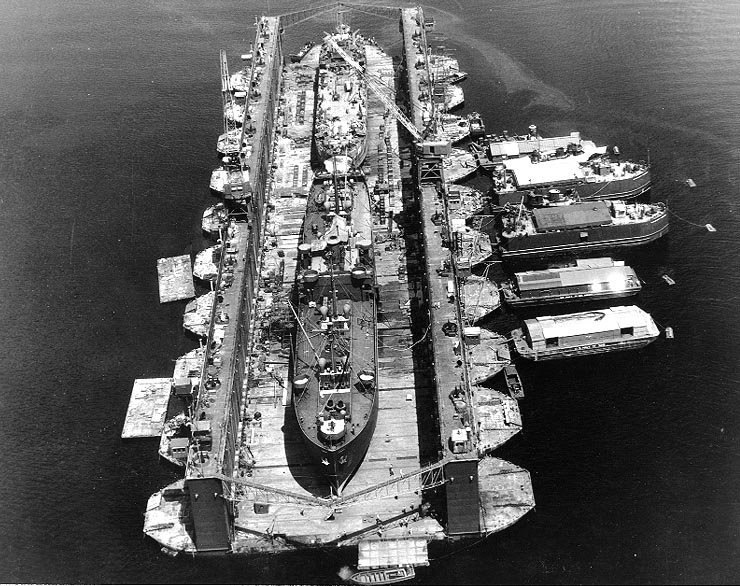
Everett-Pacific's USS Artisan (ABSD-1) with USS Antelope (IX-109) and LST-120 in the dock at Espiritu Santo, New Hebrides Islands, 8 January 1945

Auxiliary Floating Dock, Big, came in sections that are 3,850 tons and are 93 feet long each. Each Section had a 165 feet beam, a 75 feet molded depth and had 10,000 tons lifting capacity each. They are also known as Advance Base Sectional Docks (ABSD). Sections could be put together to lift larger ships. AFDB were needed to repair battleships, aircraft carriers, cruisers, and large auxiliary ships. AFDB-1 Artisan had 10 sections (A to J) for a total lift of 100,000 tons and was 1,000 feet long with all 10 sections installed. AFDB-1 to 7 were built between 1943 and 1945 and then towed to remote navy bases. An AFDB would have a crew of 600 to 1000 men, have a fresh-water distilling plant and be self-sustaining. They had a rail traveling 15-ton capacity crane with an 85-foot radius and two or more support barges. To pump out the water in the tanks there were two 24-inch discharge pumps on each section, each pump rated 15,000 gpm. For power there were two 350-kw diesel AC generators on each section, producing 440 volts 3-phase 60-cycle power. Had steam plants to run the pumps. Each section could store 65,000 gal. of fuel oil, this was to supply the ships under repair. For the crew to live next to the AFDB the Navy had barracks ships called APL, that dock next to the AFDB.

- USS Artisan (ABSD-1) (A-J)

=== Medium Auxiliary Floating Dry Docks (AFDM) ===
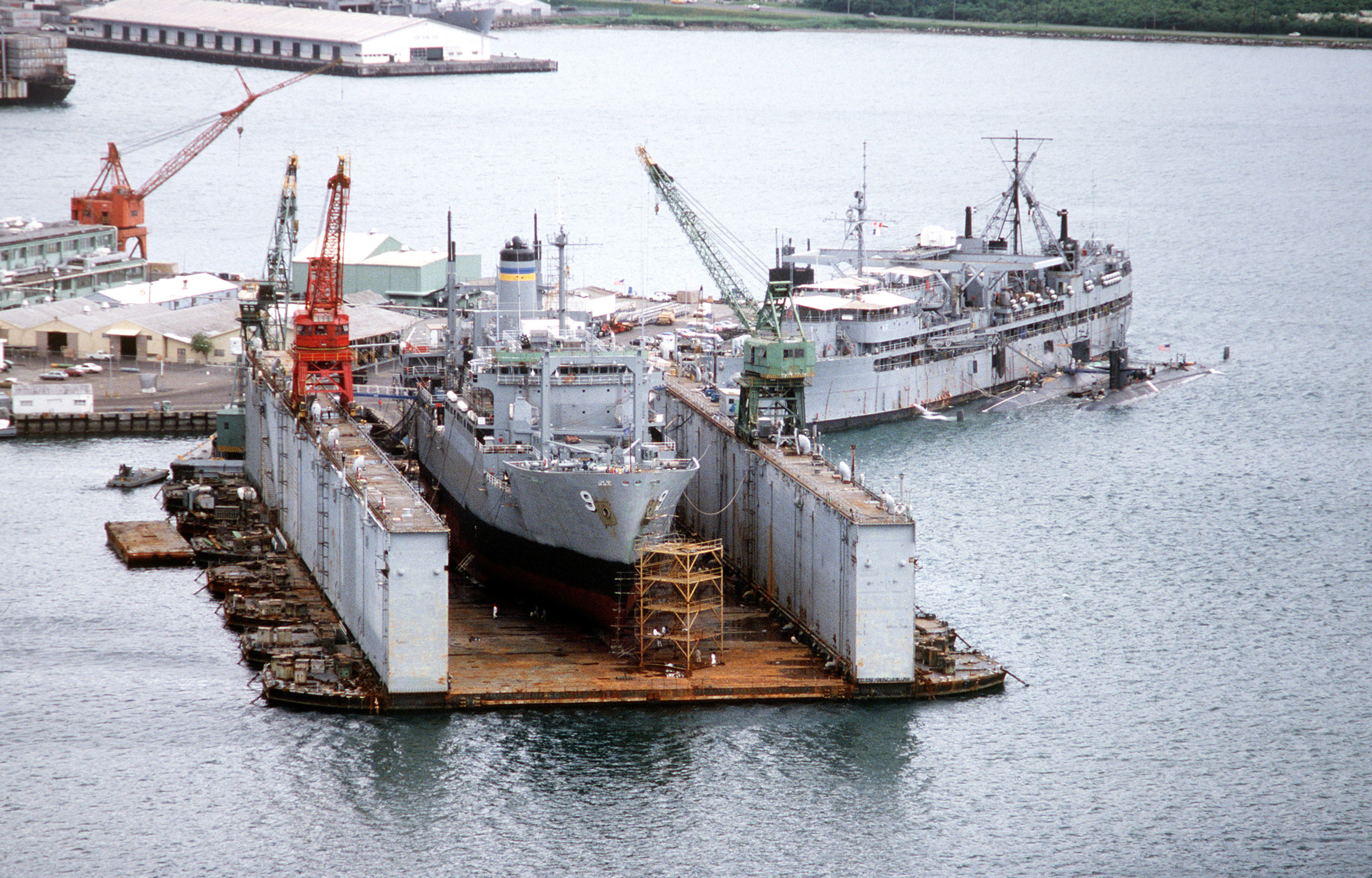
Everett-Pacific's USS Resourceful (AFDM-5) and under repair USNS Spica (T-AFS-9) at Subic Bay

Everett-Pacific's AFDM are 8,000 tons and 622 feet long. AFDM has crew of 140 to 200 men. AFDM had a lift capacity 18,000 tons and armed with two 40mm and four 20mm guns. Had two 7 1/2-ton cranes with 16 ballast tank compartments. AFDM were built in three pieces, a long center section and two shorter sections at each end. All AFDM had Yard Floating Docks (YFD) class numbers also.

- USS Resourceful (AFDM-5) Everett-Pacific, YFD 21, sold private in 1999
- USS Competent (AFDM-6) Everett-Pacific, YFD 62, sold private in 1997
- USS Sustain (AFDM-7) Everett-Pacific, YFD 63, leased to BAE Jacksonville in 1997

=== Net layer ships ===
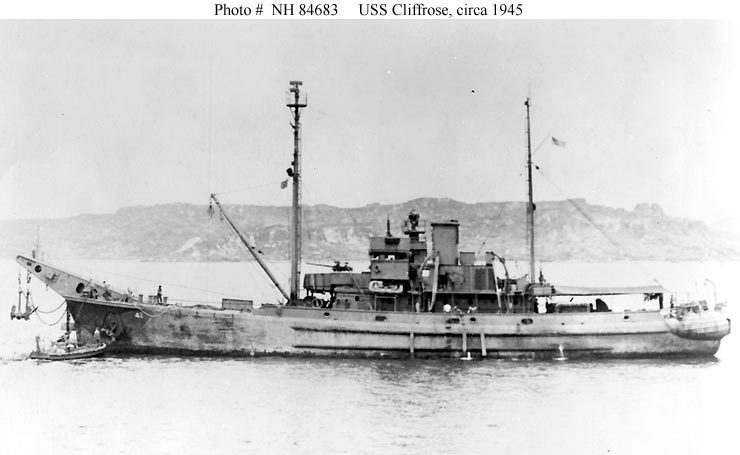
Everett-Pacific's USS Cliffrose (AN-42) a 1,100 tons Net layer ship in 1945

Net laying ships that were 1,100 tons and 194 feet long. A net layer's primary function was to lay and maintain steel anti-torpedo or anti-submarine nets. Nets could be laid around an individual ship at anchor, or around harbors or other anchorages. As World War II progressed, net layers were pressed into a variety of additional roles including salvage, troop and cargo transport, buoy maintenance, and service as tugboats.

- Ship -Delivery date
- USS Ailanthus (YN 57) - 2-Dec-1943 - Later AN 38, wrecked off Alaska 1944
- USS Bitterbush (YN 58) - 15-Jan-1944 - Later AN 39, sold 1948, destroyed 1954
- USS Anaqua (YN 59) - 21-Feb-1944 - Later a 40, sold 1946
- USS Baretta (YN 60) - 18-Mar-1944 - Later a 41, sold 1947
- USS Cliffrose (YN 61) - 30-Apr-1944 - Later a 42, to China 1947, discarded
- USS Satinleaf (YN 62) - 8-Apr-1944 - Later a 43, sold 1947
- USS Corkwood (YN 63) - 16-May-1944 - Later a 44, sold 1947
- USS Cornel (YN 64) - 6-Jun-1944 - Later a 45, sold 1947
- USS Mastic (YN 65) - 4-Jul-1944 - Later a 46, sold 1947
- USS Canotia (YN 66) - 30-Jul-1944 - Later a 47, sold 1947

=== Tugboats ===
US Navy small tugboats that were 70 tons and 66 feet long. US Navy Class District Harbor Tug. Small. Has a beam of 17 feet, draft of 4' 11", crew of 4. Propulsion was a diesel engine with a single screw and 300shp.

- YTL 422 - 21-Aug- 1944 - Sold 1986 as Spike
- YTL 423 - 2-Sep- 1944 - To Vietnam 1963
- YTL 424 - 9-Sep- 1944 - Sold 1972 as Tussler
- YTL 425 - 15-Sep- 1944 - To the Philippines 1971
- YTL 426 - 25-Sep- 1944 - To Argentina 1969
- YTL 427 - 28-Sep- 1944 - To Taiwan 1963
- YTL 428 - 11-Oct- 1944 - To Taiwan 1963, scrapped 1972
- YTL 429 - 20-Oct- 1944 - To the Philippines 1963
- YTL 430 - 944 - Sold 1970
- YTL 431 - 1944 - Now a diving platform at PSNSY.
- YTL 432 - 1944 - Sold 1972
- YTL 433 - 1944 - To Cambodia 1973
- YTL 434 - 1944 - Sold 1985 as Eugene H
- YTL 550 - 1945 - To Korea 1986
- YTL 551 - 1945 - Destroyed 1946
- YTL 552 - 1945 - Sold 1946
- YTL 553 - 1945 - Sold 1974
- YTL 554 - 1945 - To the Philippines 1948
- YTL 555 - 1945 - To Cambodia 1956
- YTL 556 - 1945 - To France as Pingouin, to Cambodia 1956
- YTL 557 - 1945 - Sold 1972
- YTL 558 - 1945 - Scrapped 1980
- YTL 559 - 1945 - To Paraguay 1963
- YTL 560 - 1945 - Sold 1971
- YTL 561 - 1945 - Sold 1946 as Ruby X, later Pi Ken, now Helen S.
- YTL 562 - 1945 - Sold 1946 as Ruby XI, later Patricia S, now Meagan M
- YTL 563 - 1945 - Sold 1946 as Ruby XII, later James B, Gregory H, scrapped 2017
- YTL 564 - 1945 - Sold 1946 as Pol, later Ruby XIV, active
- YTL 565 - 1945 -
- YTL 711 - 1945 - Sold 1947 as L C E, later Titan
- YTL 712 - 1945 - Sold 1946 as Rescue
- YTL 713 - 1945 - Sold 1946 as Margot Ann, later Margaret Ann, Ebey Island, Margaret Ann
- YTL 714 - 1945 - Sold 1947 as Alert
- YTL 715 - 1945 - Sold 1947 as Georgene M
- YTL 716 - 1945 - Sold 1947 as Chenega, now Narada
- YTL 717 - 1945 - Sold 1947 as Nellie Juan, now Carole B

=== District Harbor Tug Large (YTB) ===
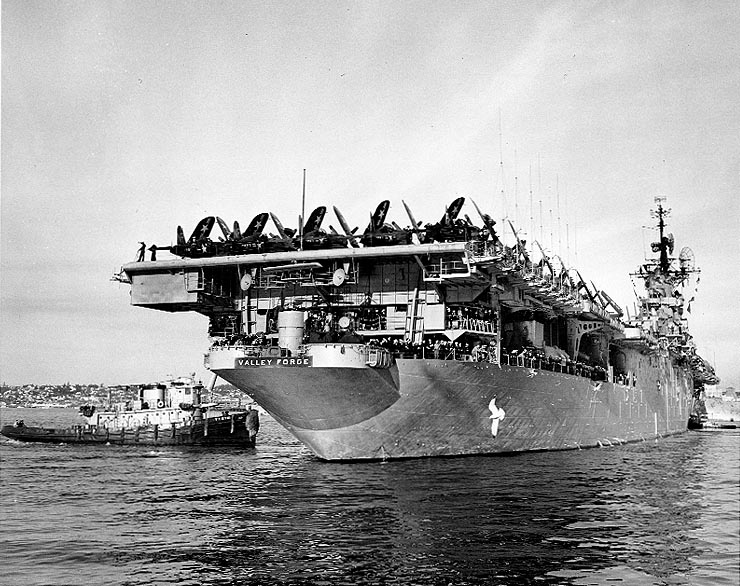
A 260-ton District Harbor Tug Large (YTB) helping move the USS Valley Forge (CV-45) an Essex-class aircraft carrier in San Diego, California.

District Harbor Tug Large (YTB) of the US Navy were 260 tons and 102 feet long. Powered by two Enterprise diesel engines at 1,270 horsepower.

- Sabeata (YTB 287) - 4-Jun-1944 - Seattle in WW2, Later YTM 763, sold 1972 as Retriever, later Glen Cove
- Saguanash (YTB 288) - 26-Jul-1944 - Sunk 1946
- Sakaweston (YTB 289) - 13-Sep-1944 - Seattle in WW2, Sold 1960 as Lummi Bay, later Lorna Foss 1969, Blackfish 1990, Rio Cuale 1991
- Canokan (YTB 290) - 21-Oct-1944 - Sold 1958 as Canocan, later Sea King, Iver Foss, now yacht Tagish

=== Barracks Barge ===
Everett-Pacific's US Navy Barracks Barges was 1,300 tons and 261 feet long. for use as a temporary barracks for sailors or other military personnel. A barracks ship may APL also were used as a receiving unit for sailors who need temporary residence prior to being assigned to their ship.

- APL 30 - 11-Apr-1945 - Scrapped 1975
- APL 31 - 14-Jun-1945 - Reefed off New Jersey 2001

=== Freight Barges (YFN) ===
Everett-Pacific YFN barges were 700 tons and 261 feet long. They were not self-propelled. A Navy class Type B ship.

- YFN 718 - 24-Jan-1945 - Later YFNB 8, sold as JMC 24, scrapped 1995
- YFN 719 - 22-Dec-1944 - Disposed of 1946
- YFN 720 - 30-Jan-1945 -
- YFN 721 - 13-Jan-1945 -
- YFN 722 - 6-Feb-1945 -
- YFN 723 - Feb-1945 - Later YFNB 12, YDT 11, YRST 1, now YR 94
- YFN 724 - Mar-1945 - Lost 1946
- YFN 725 - Mar-1945 - Lost 1946

== See also ==
- Category:Ships built by Everett-Pacific Shipbuilding & Dry Dock Company
