= Almand =

Almand is a surname. Notable people with the surname include:

- Alan Almand (born 1943), British rower
- Bond Almand (1894–1985), Chief Justice of the Supreme Court of Georgia
- James F. Almand (born 1948), Virginia attorney, politician, and judge
- John Parks Almand (1885–1969), American architect

== See also ==
- Almond (surname)
- Allemande, a Renaissance and Baroque dance
