= John Almond =

John Almond may refer to:

- John Almond (monk) (1537–1585), British Cistercian monk
- John Almond (martyr) (c. 1577–1612), British saint; one of the Forty Martyrs of England and Wales
- John Almond (Archdeacon of Montreal) (1871–1939), Canadian Anglican priest
- John Almond (footballer) (1915–1993), British footballer who played for Stoke City and Tranmere Rovers
- Jack Almond (1876–?), British footballer
- Johnny Almond (1946–2009), British flautist-saxophonist, member of Mark-Almond
- Jonathan Almond, American politician
