= USS Corkwood =

American naval ship

History

United States
- Name: USS Corkwood
- Namesake: Any of several trees having light or corky wood
- Builder: Everett-Pacific Shipbuilding & Dry Dock Company, Everett, Washington
- Laid down: as Corkwood (YN-63)
- Launched: 29 March 1944
- Sponsored by: Miss D. Anerson
- Commissioned: 16 May 1944 as USS Corkwood (AN-44)
- Decommissioned: 7 March 1946, at San Pedro, California
- Reclassified: AN-44, 20 January 1944
- Stricken: date unknown
- Honors and awards: one battle star for her World War II service
- Fate: Transferred to the War Shipping Administration for disposal 13 March 1946; fate unknown

General characteristics
- Class & type: Ailanthus-class net laying ship
- Tonnage: 1,100 tons
- Length: 194 ft 7 in (59.31 m)
- Beam: 37 ft (11 m)
- Draft: 13 ft 6 in (4.11 m)
- Propulsion: diesel electric, 2,500 hp
- Speed: 12.1 knots
- Complement: 56 officers and enlisted
- Armament: one single 3 in (76 mm) gun mount, two single 20 mm gun mounts

USS Corkwood (AN-44/YN-63) was an Ailanthus-class net laying ship which served with the U.S. Navy in the western Pacific Ocean theatre of operations during World War II. Her career was without major incident, and she returned home safely after the war with one battle star to her credit.

== Built in Everett, Washington ==
Corkwood (AN-44) was launched as YN-63, 29 March 1944 by Everett-Pacific Shipbuilding & Dry Dock Company, Everett, Washington; sponsored by Miss D. Anerson; reclassified AN-44 and named Corkwood 20 January 1944; and commissioned 16 May 1944.

== World War II Service ==
Sailing from Seattle, Washington, 27 August 1944 with district harbor tug (small) YTL-422 in tow, Corkwood arrived at Pearl Harbor 6 September for duty towing target rafts and for replacing buoys and radar rafts until 16 October. From 27 October until 6 March 1945 Corkwood conducted net operations and laid cruiser moorings at Eniwetok.

Sailing by way of Ulithi to Leyte, she joined Amphibious Group 7 and sortied with an LST flotilla for the Okinawa operation. She served as harbor entrance control ship at Kerama Retto between 26 March and 6 July. She also conducted salvage and net maintenance operations, frequently under enemy attack.

Arriving at San Pedro Bay, Leyte, 12 July 1945, Corkwood underwent repairs, then sailed to Ulithi, arriving 17 August. She tended nets at this port until 16 October when she departed for the U.S. West Coast.

== Post-war decommissioning ==
She arrived at San Diego, California, 29 November and remained there until decommissioned 7 March 1946. She was transferred to the War Shipping Administration for disposal 13 March 1946.

== Honors and awards ==
Corkwood received one battle star for World II service.
