= USS Mastic =

History

United States
- Name: USS Mastic
- Namesake: A small tree (Pistaria lenticus) of southern Europe
- Ordered: as Ginkgo (YN-65)
- Builder: Everett-Pacific Shipbuilding & Dry Dock Company, Everett, Washington
- Laid down: as Mastic (YN-65), 27 November 1943
- Launched: 19 May 1944
- Sponsored by: Mrs. F. A. Fenger
- Commissioned: 4 July 1944, USS Mastic (AN-46)
- Decommissioned: 1 March 1946 at Tiburon, California
- Renamed: Mastic, 17 April 1943
- Reclassified: AN-46, 20 January 1944
- Stricken: date unknown
- Fate: Transferred to the U.S. Maritime Commission 6 June 1947, and sold

General characteristics
- Class & type: Ailanthus-class net laying ship
- Tonnage: 1,100 tons
- Displacement: 1,275 tons
- Length: 194 ft 6 in (59.28 m)
- Beam: 37 ft (11 m)
- Draft: 13 ft 6 in (4.11 m)
- Propulsion: diesel electric, 2,500hp
- Speed: 12 knots
- Complement: 56 officers and enlisted
- Armament: one single 3 in (76 mm) gun mount, three 20 mm gun mounts

USS Mastic (AN-46/YN-65) was an Ailanthus-class net laying ship which served with the U.S. Navy in the South Pacific Ocean theatre of operations during World War II. Her career was without major incident, and she returned home safely after the war.

== Constructed in Everett, Washington ==
Mastic (AN 46), originally named Ginkgo (YN 65), was renamed Mastic 17 April 1943; laid down as YN-65 by Everett-Pacific Shipbuilding & Dry Dock Company, Everett, Washington, 27 November 1943; reclassified AN-46 on 20 January 1944; launched 19 May 1944; sponsored by Mrs. F. A. Fenger; and commissioned at Everett 4 July 1944.

== World War II service ==
After shakedown along the U.S. West Coast, Mastic steamed via Pearl Harbor to the western Pacific for duty with Commander Minecraft, Pacific Fleet. Beginning late in the year she carried out net laying and tending duties at American bases in the Mariana Islands and the western Caroline Islands.

During the later months of fighting in the Pacific she operated primarily out of Ulithi, but in addition served at Guam, Saipan, and Peleliu.

Following the Japanese capitulation 15 August, she continued servicing harbor defense installations until 26 October when she sailed from Saipan for the west coast. Steaming via Midway Islands and Pearl Harbor, she reached San Francisco, California, 25 November.

== Post-war decommissioning ==
Mastic decommissioned at Tiburon, California, 1 March 1946, and her name was struck from the Navy List 28 March. She was transferred to the U.S. Maritime Commission 6 June 1947 for simultaneous delivery to her purchaser, William Semar.

== See also ==
- United States Navy
- World War II
