= USS Cliffrose =

Ship

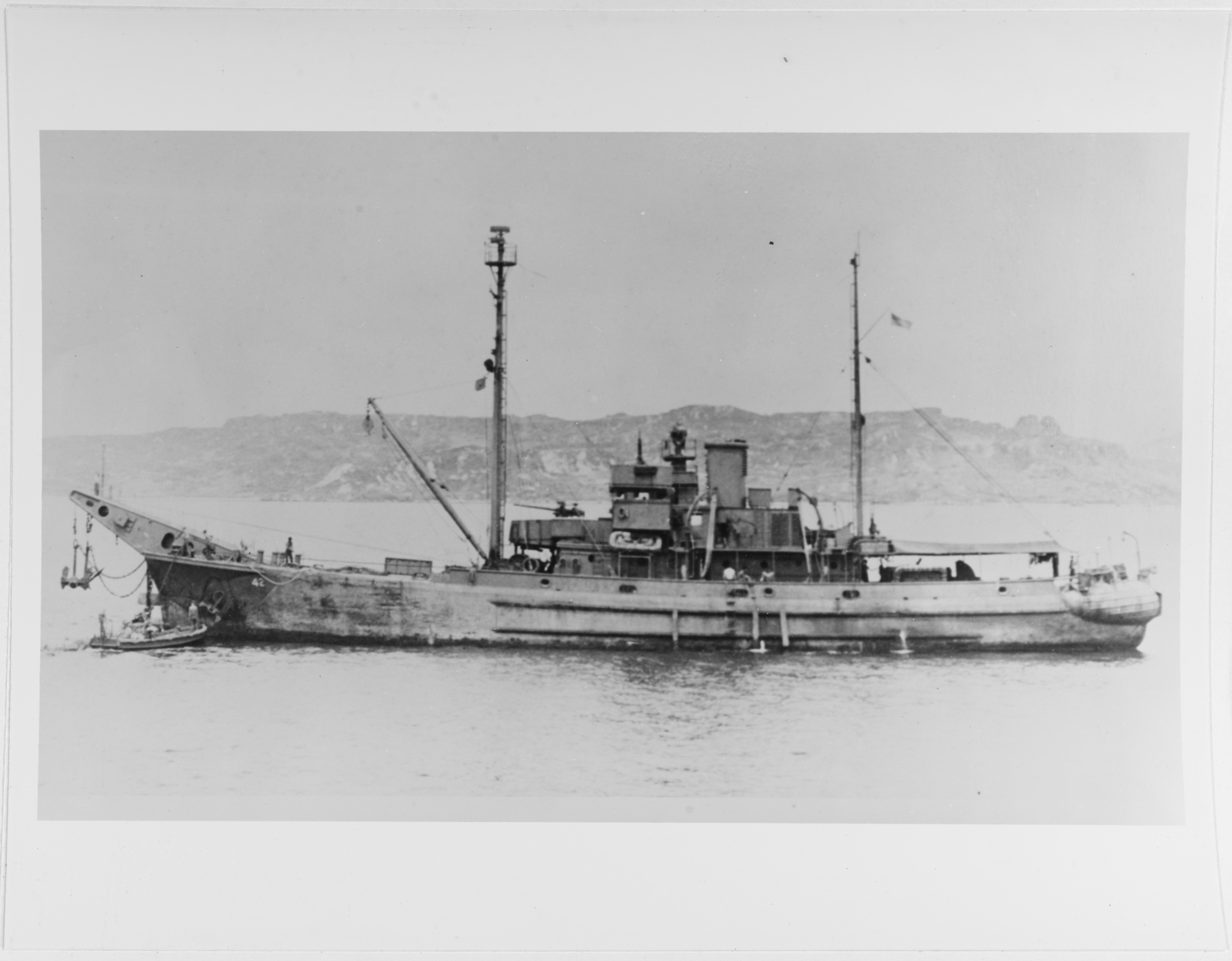
- USS Cliffrose (AN-42) In a harbor, c. 1945. She appears to be lifting a large anchor

History

United States
- Name: USS Cliffrose (YN-61)
- Namesake: Cliffrose
- Builder: Everett-Pacific Shipbuilding & Dry Dock Company, Everett, Washington
- Launched: 27 November 1943
- Sponsored by: Miss S. Morgan
- Commissioned: 30 April 1944
- Decommissioned: 7 January 1947 at Shanghai, China
- Reclassified: AN-42, 20 January 1944
- Stricken: c. 1947
- Honors and awards: two battle stars for World War II service
- Fate: turned over to the Republic of China through the U.S. State Department, 7 January 1947

General characteristics
- Class & type: Ailanthus-class net laying ship
- Displacement: 1,100 tons
- Length: 194 ft 7 in (59.31 m)
- Beam: 37 ft (11 m)
- Draft: 13 ft 6 in (4.11 m)
- Propulsion: diesel electric, 2,500shp
- Speed: 12.1 knots
- Complement: 56 officers and enlisted
- Armament: one single 3 in (76 mm) dual purpose gun mount, two single 20 mm AA gun mounts

USS Cliffrose (AN-42/YN-61) was an Ailanthus-class net laying ship which served with the U.S. Navy in the western Pacific Ocean theatre of operations during World War II. Her career was without major incident, and she returned home safely after the war with two battle stars to her credit.

== Launched in Washington ==
Cliffrose (YN-61) was launched 27 November 1943 by Everett-Pacific Shipbuilding & Dry Dock Company, Everett, Washington; sponsored by Miss S. Morgan; reclassified AN-42, 20 January 1944; and commissioned 30 April 1944.

== World War II service ==
Cliffrose sailed from San Pedro, California, 21 June 1944 for Pearl Harbor, arriving 4 July for local duty. She departed 8 August for the Florida Islands and the invasion of Peleliu on 15 September. She carried out surveys for the installation of moorings, and then laid an anti-torpedo net across the western entrance of Kossol Passage, remaining in the Palau Islands until 8 December, when she sailed for Ulithi. Arriving 10 December, she was briefly overhauled and had duty repairing nets.

Cliffrose put out from Ulithi 25 March 1945 for the Okinawa invasion, arriving on 1 April, the day of the first landings, for duty installing and repairing nets until 5 August. After upkeep at Saipan, she returned to Okinawa 20 September, loaded supplies, and cleared 25 October for Bungo Suido, Japan, arriving 29 October. Here she laid navigational aids until the end of the year, sailing then for Pearl Harbor and San Pedro, California, where she arrived 1 January 1946.

Cliffrose cleared San Pedro, after local operations, 3 July 1946 for Pearl Harbor, where she operated from 16 July to 16 August; Guam and Subic Bay, arriving 14 September. She served in Philippine waters until 25 December, when she cleared Subic Bay for Shanghai, arriving 31 December.

== Post-war decommissioning ==
Cliffrose was decommissioned 7 January 1947 and turned over to the Republic of China through the U.S. State Department.

== Honors and awards ==
Cliffrose received two battle stars for World War II service.
