= USS Satinleaf =

History

United States
- Name: USS Satinleaf
- Namesake: A tree of Florida and the West Indies
- Builder: Everett-Pacific Shipbuilding & Dry Dock Company, Everett, Washington
- Laid down: 5 July 1943 as Yard Net Tender Satinleaf (YN-62)
- Launched: 15 February 1944
- Commissioned: 8 April 1944 as USS Satinleaf (AN-43)
- Decommissioned: 4 April 1946, at Tiburon, California
- Reclassified: as a Net Laying Ship, 20 January 1944
- Honours and awards: two battle stars for World War II service
- Fate: transferred to the U.S. Maritime Commission for disposal as of 7 May 1947; delivered to buyer on 29 April 1947

General characteristics
- Class & type: Ailanthus-class net laying ship
- Tonnage: 1,100 tons
- Displacement: 1,275 tons
- Length: 194 ft 7 in (59.31 m)
- Beam: 37 ft (11 m)
- Draft: 13 ft 6 in (4.11 m)
- Propulsion: diesel electric, 2,500hp
- Speed: 12.1 knots
- Complement: 56 officers and enlisted
- Armament: one single 3 in (76 mm) gun mount, four twin 20 mm gun mounts

USS Satinleaf (AN-43/YN-62) was an Ailanthus-class net laying ship which served with the U.S. Navy in the western Pacific Ocean theatre of operations during World War II. Her career was without major incident, and she returned home safely after the war with two battle stars to her credit.

== Launched in Washington ==
Satinleaf was laid down as YN-62 on 5 July 1943 by Everett-Pacific Shipbuilding & Dry Dock Company, Everett, Washington; reclassified AN-43 on 20 January 1944; launched on 15 February 1944; and commissioned on 8 April 1944.

== World War II service ==
=== Pacific Ocean operations ===
Satinleaf arrived at San Pedro, California, on 9 May 1944 for shakedown, and sailed from there on 13 June 1944 to join the Service Force, U.S. 7th Fleet, at Funafuti, traveling via Pearl Harbor.

On 27 July, she departed Funafuti towing an Army barge which she delivered to Milne Bay, New Guinea, on 6 August. She was employed there as a harbor defense and general utility vessel until 1 October, departing the harbor only to deliver a barge to Manus between 18 and 25 September.

=== Supporting invasion of the Philippines ===
On 1 October, the ship sailed for Brisbane, Australia, where she loaded sonar buoy equipment for use in the forthcoming assault at Leyte Gulf. Picking up personnel for the buoy unit at Milne Bay on 15 October, she arrived at Leyte on 29 October, shortly after the landings.

The ship began laying the sonar buoys on 5 November 1944, and guarded them until 17 January 1945, providing protection to ships anchored off Leyte. On 20 January, she became Harbor Entry Control Vessel and performed that duty until 12 March. Then, for the next month, she was employed in general utility work in San Pedro and Guiuan Roadstead and assisted part-time with the Guiuan Roadtead net defenses.

=== Supporting Tarakan landings ===
On 15 April 1945, Satinleaf was assigned to the Amphibious Forces, 7th Fleet, and sailed a week later with navigation buoys for the Tarakan landings. Arriving off Tarakan, Borneo, on 27 April, she laid navigation buoys to guide the assault ships along the cleared channel.

This mission was completed on 30 April, and the ship sailed on 8 May for Morotai where she staged for the Brunei landings. Arriving off Brunei, Borneo, on 7 June, she once again laid navigation buoys in the channel; and, after completion of this duty on 9 June, she remained in the area providing general utility services until departing for Leyte Gulf on 25 June. She helped install net defenses in Guiuan Roadstead until sailing to Manus on 12 July for overhaul.

=== End-of-war operations ===
Returning to Guiuan Roadstead on 30 August, after the Japanese surrender, Satinleaf helped remove net defenses in the Leyte Gulf area until sailing for the United States on 27 November 1945 via Eniwetok and Pearl Harbor. She arrived at San Pedro, California, on 4 January 1946 and moved to Tiburon, California, on 13 February to begin inactivation.

== Post-war decommissioning ==
She was decommissioned on 4 April 1946 and struck from the Navy list on 8 May 1946. The ship was transferred to the U.S. Maritime Commission as of 7 May 1947 and delivered to her purchaser, E. E. Johnson, on 29 April 1947. Vessel was later sold to Foundation Maritime, Limited of Halifax, Nova Scotia and converted to a Salvage/Rescue tug "Foundation Josephine II" In 1960 Foundation sold her to become the research vessel "North Star IV" foundered during a hydro-graphic expedition in 1961.

== Honors and awards ==
Satinleaf earned two battle stars during World War II.
