= Almond Lee =

Horse trainer

Almond Lee (born 9 October 1964) is a horse trainer. His most successful season was 2006/07 with 44 winners, and he sent out 23 winners in 2010/11 for a total of 223 in Hong Kong.

== Performance ==
Seasons	Total Runners	No. of Wins	No. of 2nds	No. of 3rds	No. of 4ths	Stakes won
2010/2011	390	23	20	25	34	HK$17,131,825
