= James Almond =

English footballer

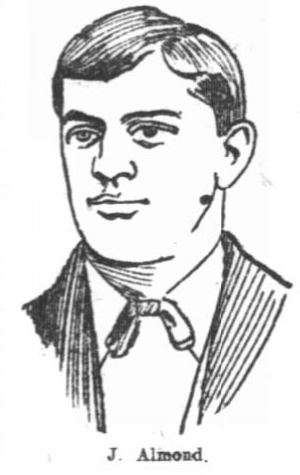
- Almond drawn in 1902

Personal information
- Full name: James Almond
- Date of birth: September 1874
- Place of birth: Clayton-le-Moors, England
- Date of death: 1923 (aged 48–49)
- Position: Left-half

Senior career*
Years	Team	Apps	(Gls)
18xx–1896	Nelson		
1896–1897	Burnley	1	(0)
1897–1898	Swindon Town	29	(2)
- * Club domestic league appearances and goals

James Almond (September 1874 – 1923) was an English footballer who played as a left-half. He played one match in the Football League for Burnley before transferring to Swindon Town in 1897.

Almond started his career with Nelson in the Lancashire League, before joining Football League First Division side Burnley in November 1896. He made one appearance for the club, deputising for the absent William Longair in the 1–1 draw with Sheffield United at Turf Moor on 16 January 1897. After failing to break into the first team, Almond joined Southern League club Swindon Town later the same month. He made his debut for Swindon in the 1–1 draw with Gravesend United on 30 January, and went on to play seven more matches during the remainder of the season. Almond established himself as Swindon's first-choice left-half in the 1897–98 campaign, missing only one Southern League match. He scored his first goal for the club in the 3–0 win over Tottenham Hotspur on 5 February 1898, and netted his second of the season in the 1–2 home defeat to Chatham on 26 March. He left Swindon in the summer of 1898 and subsequently retired from football.
