= Mission Hills, Santa Barbara County, California =

Census-designated place in the U.S. state of California

Mission Hills
- CDP
- Location in Santa Barbara County and the state of California
- Coordinates: 34°41′21″N 120°26′10″W
- Country: United States
- State: California
- County: Santa Barbara

Government
  - State senator: Monique Limón (D)
  - Assemblymember: Gregg Hart (D)
  - U. S. rep.: Salud Carbajal (D)

Area
  - Total: 1.217 sq mi (3.151 km^{2})
  - Land: 1.209 sq mi (3.131 km^{2})
  - Water: 0.0081 sq mi (0.021 km^{2}) 0.65%
- Elevation: 325 ft (99 m)

Population (2020)
  - Total: 3,571
  - Density: 2,954/sq mi (1,141/km^{2})
- Time zone: UTC-8 (PST)
  - Summer (DST): UTC-7 (PDT)
- ZIP code: 93436
- Area code: 805
- FIPS code: 06-48186
- GNIS feature ID: 1867041

Mission Hills is a census-designated place (CDP) in Santa Barbara County, California, United States, a short distance north of Lompoc on Highway 1. The population was 3,571 at the 2020 census, down from 3,576 at the 2010 census.

== Geography ==
Mission Hills is located at 34°41′21″N 120°26′10″W (34.689313, −120.436150).

According to the United States Census Bureau, the CDP has a total area of 1.2 square miles (3.1 km^{2}), 99.35% of which is land and 0.65% of which is water.

== Demographics ==
Historical population
| Census | Pop. | Note | %± |
|---|---|---|---|
| 1970 | 2,699 | | — |
| 1980 | 2,797 | | 3.6% |
| 1990 | 3,112 | | 11.3% |
| 2000 | 3,142 | | 1.0% |
| 2010 | 3,576 | | 13.8% |
| 2020 | 3,571 | | −0.1% |
U.S. Decennial Census; 1860–1870 1880-1890; 1900 1910 1920; 1930 1940 1950; 1960 1970 1980; 1990 2000 2010; 2020

Mission Hills was listed as an unincorporated place in the 1970 U.S. census; and then as a census designated place in the 1980 U.S. census.

=== Racial and ethnic composition ===
Mission Hills CDP, California – Racial and ethnic composition Note: the US Census treats Hispanic/Latino as an ethnic category. This table excludes Latinos from the racial categories and assigns them to a separate category. Hispanics/Latinos may be of any race.
| Race / Ethnicity (NH = Non-Hispanic) | Pop 2000 | Pop 2010 | Pop 2020 | % 2000 | % 2010 | % 2020 |
|---|---|---|---|---|---|---|
| White alone (NH) | 2,173 | 2,089 | 1,908 | 69.16% | 58.42% | 53.43% |
| Black or African American alone (NH) | 108 | 86 | 89 | 3.44% | 2.40% | 2.49% |
| Native American or Alaska Native alone (NH) | 32 | 28 | 19 | 1.02% | 0.78% | 0.53% |
| Asian alone (NH) | 91 | 120 | 113 | 2.90% | 3.36% | 3.16% |
| Native Hawaiian or Pacific Islander alone (NH) | 11 | 9 | 9 | 0.35% | 0.25% | 0.25% |
| Other race alone (NH) | 8 | 3 | 6 | 0.25% | 0.08% | 0.17% |
| Mixed race or Multiracial (NH) | 79 | 104 | 214 | 2.51% | 2.91% | 5.99% |
| Hispanic or Latino (any race) | 640 | 1,137 | 1,213 | 20.37% | 31.80% | 33.97% |
| Total | 3,142 | 3,576 | 3,571 | 100.00% | 100.00% | 100.00% |

=== 2020 ===
The 2020 United States census reported that Mission Hills had a population of 3,571. The population density was 2,953.7 inhabitants per square mile (1,140.4/km^{2}). The racial makeup of Mission Hills was 60.3% White, 3.0% African American, 2.0% Native American, 3.2% Asian, 0.3% Pacific Islander, 12.5% from other races, and 18.8% from two or more races. Hispanic or Latino of any race were 34.0% of the population.

The whole population lived in households. There were 1,184 households, out of which 30.2% included children under the age of 18, 59.0% were married-couple households, 5.3% were cohabiting couple households, 20.4% had a female householder with no partner present, and 15.4% had a male householder with no partner present. 17.1% of households were one person, and 9.8% were one person aged 65 or older. The average household size was 3.02. There were 895 families (75.6% of all households).

The age distribution was 22.7% under the age of 18, 8.1% aged 18 to 24, 20.9% aged 25 to 44, 29.5% aged 45 to 64, and 18.8% who were 65 years of age or older. The median age was 43.4 years. For every 100 females, there were 107.9 males.

There were 1,226 housing units at an average density of 1,014.1 units per square mile (391.5 units/km^{2}), of which 1,184 (96.6%) were occupied. Of these, 83.4% were owner-occupied, and 16.6% were occupied by renters.

In 2023, the US Census Bureau estimated that the median household income was $106,455, and the per capita income was $41,820. About 4.1% of families and 4.9% of the population were below the poverty line.

=== 2010 ===
At the 2010 census Mission Hills had a population of 3,576. The population density was 2,890.8 inhabitants per square mile (1,116.1/km^{2}). The racial makeup of Mission Hills was 2,689 (75.2%) White; 91 (2.5%) African American; 74 (2.1%) Native American; 125 (3.5%) Asian; 9 (0.3%) Pacific Islander; 386 (10.8%) from other races; and 202 (5.6%) from two or more races. Hispanic or Latino of any race were 1,137 persons (31.8%).

The whole population lived in households, no one lived in non-institutionalized group quarters and no one was institutionalized.

There were 1,182 households, 447 (37.8%) had children under the age of 18 living in them, 785 (66.4%) were opposite-sex married couples living together, 115 (9.7%) had a female householder with no husband present, 65 (5.5%) had a male householder with no wife present. There were 59 (5.0%) unmarried opposite-sex partnerships, and 2 (0.2%) same-sex married couples or partnerships. 165 households (14.0%) were one person and 94 (8.0%) had someone living alone who was 65 or older. The average household size was 3.03. There were 965 families (81.6% of households); the average family size was 3.30.

The age distribution was 954 people (26.7%) under the age of 18, 297 people (8.3%) aged 18 to 24, 755 people (21.1%) aged 25 to 44, 1,043 people (29.2%) aged 45 to 64, and 527 people (14.7%) who were 65 or older. The median age was 40.0 years. For every 100 females, there were 99.6 males. For every 100 females age 18 and over, there were 97.9 males.

There were 1,223 housing units at an average density of 988.7 per square mile, of the occupied units 1,002 (84.8%) were owner-occupied and 180 (15.2%) were rented. The homeowner vacancy rate was 0.7%; the rental vacancy rate was 2.2%. 2,878 people (80.5% of the population) lived in owner-occupied housing units and 698 people (19.5%) lived in rental housing units.
