= Almond Village, Ontario =

Almond Village
- Unincorporated community
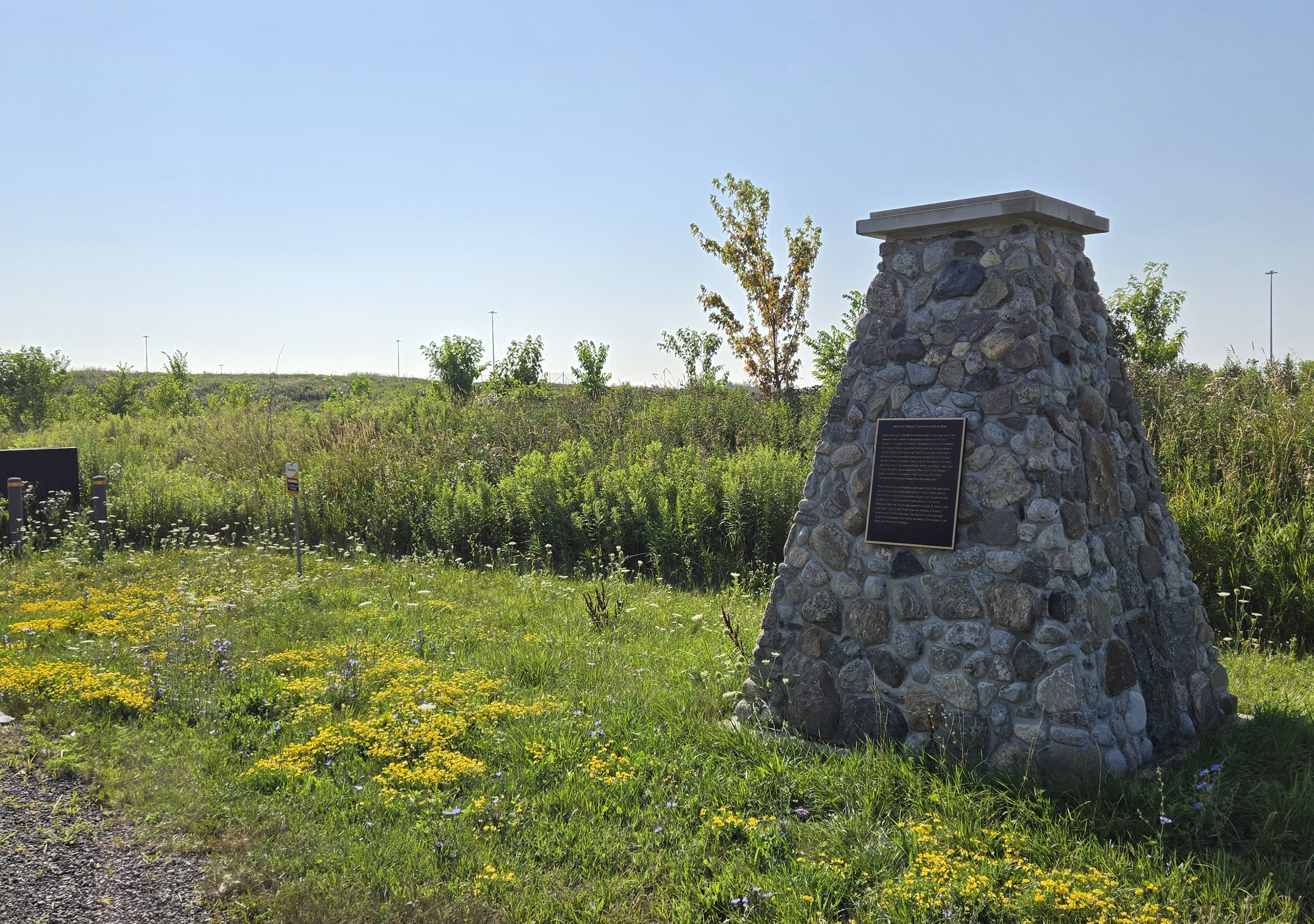
- Cairn and plaque on Almond Avenue in Almond Village

- Location within Regional Municipality of Durham Location within Southern Ontario
- Coordinates: 43°52′1.23″N 78°58′58.83″W
- Country: Canada
- Province: Ontario
- Regional Municipality: Durham Region
- Town: Whitby
- Time zone: UTC-5 (Eastern (EST))
  - Summer (DST): UTC-4 (EDT)

Almond Village is a community in Whitby, Durham Region, Ontario, Canada.

Settled in 1837, it is one of the oldest communities in Whitby.

== History ==
James Almond and his wife settled here in 1837.

The Almond's donated land for a church called "Almonds Church", erected in 1842. It was the first church in Whitby, and second oldest church in Ontario County. James Almond would occasionally serve as preacher. The church ceased operation in 1971, and was torn down.

The early settlement had a school, Union School Number One, and a blacksmith.

In 2010, there were approximately 70 to 80 residential homes in Almond Village, primarily built between the 1950s and 1970s.
