= USS Bitterbush =

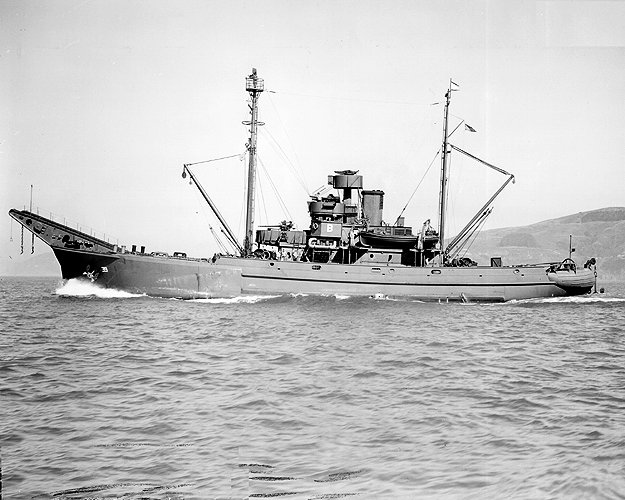
- Bitterbush at San Francisco, 12 November 1944

History

United States
- Name: USS Bitterbush
- Namesake: A small tropical American tree with red berries
- Builder: Everett-Pacific Shipbuilding & Dry Dock Company, Everett, Washington
- Laid down: 30 November 1942 as Almond (YN-58)
- Launched: 30 June 1943
- Sponsored by: Miss Veberly Jean Miller
- Commissioned: 15 January 1944 as USS Bitterbush (YN-58)
- Decommissioned: 4 January 1946, at Mare Island Navy Yard, Vallejo, California
- Renamed: Bitterbush (YN-58), 3 April 1943
- Reclassified: AN-39, 20 January 1944
- Stricken: 21 January 1946
- Honors and awards: one battle star (Iwo Jima) for World War II service
- Fate: Transferred to the U.S. Maritime Commission, 6 May 1947; destroyed by fire off Puerto Rico, 27 May 1954

General characteristics
- Class & type: Ailanthus-class net laying ship
- Displacement: 1,100 long tons (1,100 t)
- Length: 194 ft 7 in (59.3 m)
- Beam: 34 ft 7 in (10.5 m)
- Draft: 13 ft 6 in (4.1 m)
- Installed power: 2,500 hp (1,900 kW)
- Propulsion: diesel electric
- Speed: 12 knots (22 km/h; 14 mph)
- Complement: 56 officers and enlisted
- Armament: one single 3 in (76 mm) dual purpose gun mount; two single 20 mm AA gun mounts

USS Bitterbush (AN-39/YN-58) was an Ailanthus-class net laying ship which served with the U.S. Navy in the western Pacific Ocean theatre of operations during World War II. She served the U.S. Pacific Fleet with her protective anti-submarine nets, and returned home safely after the war with one battle star to her credit.

== Built in Washington ==
The net tender Almond (YN-58) was laid down on 30 November 1942 at Everett, Washington, by the Everett-Pacific Shipbuilding & Dry Dock Company; renamed Bitterbush on 3 April 1943; launched on 30 June 1943; sponsored by Miss Veberly Jean Miller; and commissioned on 15 January 1944.

== World War II service ==
Redesignated a net laying ship, AN-39, on 20 January 1944, Bitterbush completed outfitting on 26 February 1944, reported for duty to the Commander, Operational Training Command, Pacific, and departed Seattle, Washington, for San Diego, California, that same day. Following shakedown training, Bitterbush reported for duty to the Commandant, 12th Naval District, arriving at San Francisco, California, on 20 March. The ship worked the submarine nets at Tiburon, California, and San Francisco over the next eight months, before departing San Francisco Bay on 29 November 1944.

Bitterbush made stops at Port Hueneme, Terminal Island, and San Pedro, California, before setting out across the Pacific Ocean on 5 December 1944. Proceeding to Pearl Harbor, the ship reported on 5 January 1945 to the Commander, 5th Amphibious Force, for duty. Underway from Oahu on 24 January 1945, the ship sailed via Eniwetok and Guam to Iwo Jima. After voyage repairs, Bitterbush worked on the submarine net line at the recently conquered island through the end of hostilities with Japan.

== End-of-war decommissioning ==
On 17 September 1945, she sailed for the United States. Proceeding via Saipan, Eniwetok, and Pearl Harbor, the ship reached San Francisco by 20 October 1945. Entering drydock soon after her arrival, the net layer—although at one time considered for use removing anti-submarine nets in the 12th Naval District—remained drydocked at the Mare Island Naval Shipyard until decommissioned on 4 January 1946. Deemed surplus to Navy needs, Bitterbush was struck from the Navy List on 21 January 1946.

Transferred to the U.S. Maritime Commission for disposal on 6 May 1947, she was sold and converted for merchant service, in which capacity she operated from 1948 until destroyed by fire off Puerto Rico on 27 May 1954.

== Honors and awards ==
Bitterbush was awarded one battle star for her World War II service.
