= John Almond (footballer) =

English footballer

Personal information
- Date of birth: 21 November 1915
- Place of birth: Prescot, England
- Date of death: 1993 (aged 78)
- Height: 5 ft 8 1/2 in (1.74 m)
- Position: Outside left

Senior career*
Years	Team	Apps	(Gls)
- Prescot Cables
1934–1935	Stoke City	3	(1)
1936–1937	Tranmere Rovers	22	(5)
1937–1939	Shrewsbury Town		
Total		25	(6)
- * Club domestic league appearances and goals

John Almond (21 November 1915 – 1993) was an English footballer who played in the Football League for Stoke City and Tranmere Rovers.

== Career ==
Almond joined Stoke City from Prescot Cables in 1934. He played as a reserve, failing to dislodge Joe Johnson – an England international – from the outside left position. His only goal for Stoke came on his league debut in a 2–1 defeat at Wolverhampton Wanderers in April 1935.

Almond joined Tranmere Rovers in 1936 and finished his career with Shrewsbury Town where he was a regular first-team player scoring goals consistently in the Birmingham & District League for two seasons.

== Career statistics ==
Appearances and goals by club, season and competition
Club	Season	League			FA Cup		Total	
Club	Season	Division	Apps	Goals	Apps	Goals	Apps	Goals
Stoke City	1934–35	First Division	1	1	0	0	1	1
Stoke City	1935–36	First Division	2	0	0	0	2	0
Tranmere Rovers	1936–37	Third Division North	22	5	1	0	23	5
Career Total			25	6	1	0	26	6
