= Mary Almond =

English radio astronomer (1928–2015)

- Born: Mary Almond; 2 January 1928; Manchester, England
- Died: 26 April 2015 (aged 87)
- Education: University of Manchester
- Scientific career
- Fields: astronomy, physics, computing, palaeomagnetism
- Workplaces: University of Manchester; Jodrell Bank Observatory; Open University; University of London

Mary Almond (2 January 1928 – 26 April 2015) was an English physicist, radio astronomer, palaeomagnetist, mathematician, and computer scientist who completed an early PhD in radio astronomy at Jodrell Bank Observatory in 1952.

== Biography ==
Mary Almond was born in Manchester and studied for a degree in physics at the University of Manchester from 1946 to 1949, where she was taught by Patrick Blackett and Bernard Lovell.

At the end of their first year of physics lectures, Lovell asked if any of the male students would be interested in spending some time at Jodrell Bank over the summer, digging trenches and mixing concrete and other somewhat physical tasks. After the lecture, Almond went to see him and asked, "Would there be anything for girls to do at Jodrell?" and Lovell said he was sure he could find them something.

Almond and Majorie, an old school friend of Almond's who was in the same year, spent two weeks working at Jodrell Bank, living at Alderley Edge in a caravan belonging to Almond's former physics teacher and cycling to Jodrell Bank where they sandpapered rust off the searchlight mount that they were going to attach an aerial to. During these two weeks, Almond also witnessed Manning Prentice doing visual meteor at this time and correlating them with the radar echoes on screen

At this time, there were no permanent radio astronomy buildings on site, just "these old army trailers in a sea of mud."

The following summer Almond returned but lived on site in a tent alongside other young physics students, all of them male. After two summers at Jodrell Bank and after graduating with a 2:1 physics degree from Manchester in 1949, Almond decided to do her PhD in radio astronomy at Jodrell Bank and returned to a site partially transformed with the newly constructed prefab huts and road around 'the Green' area as well as the Transit Telescope.

Between 1949 and 1952, Almond worked on her PhD in Radiant Hut, analysing film recordings of meteor echoes to calculate the velocity of their orbits. Almond's PhD was in such a relatively new field that they found it difficult to find a suitable external examiner. Lovell eventually secured German astronomer Erwin Finlay-Freundlich, then based at St Andrews Observatory, as Almond's external examiner. Almond published a number of important and early papers in radio and radar astronomy based on her PhD research during and immediately after her PhD, most co-authored with her PhD supervisor John Grant Davies as well as Bernard Lovell himself.

Almond died on 26 April 2015, at the age of 87.

== Career and research ==
After completing her PhD in 1952, Almond had a job offer from Ferranti but instead began working on palaeomagnetism with Peter Stubbs and John Clegg in a group established by Professor Patrick Blackett. Their research on Late Triassic New Red Sandstone indicated that England had rotated 34° and moved towards the north pole over geological time and is regarded as playing an important role in convincing Earth scientists of the importance of palaeomagnetism in studying Earth history.

The magnetometer, one of the pieces equipment used, required a large gold bar and Almond, who was dating and later married the technician (Jim) who transported the gold bar, would joke about hacking off a small piece for her wedding ring.

Almond married around this time and moved, with Blackett, from the University of Manchester to Imperial College, London and stayed until 1954 when she left on a career break to have a children. She soon returned to working part-time, first teaching science in a local secondary school for six months and then learned computer programming before going on to become a lecturer in mathematics and computer science. Almond was one of the first computer science lecturers in the UK and one of the first (if not the first) female computer science lecturers in the UK.

Almond worked at the University of London for a short while and then returned to Manchester where she taught at the University of Manchester and then moved to the Open University where she taught until 2008 when she retired at the age of 80.
