= Almond Chu =

Hong Kong-based artist and photographer

Almond CHU
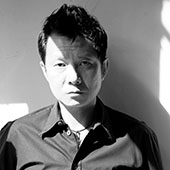
- Born: 1962; Hong Kong, China
- Known for: Fine art photography
- Website: http://www.almondchu.com/

Almond CHU (Chinese 朱德華) (born 1962 in Hong Kong, China) is a Hong Kong–based artist and photographer, known for his black and white photographs and large format conceptual color images.

== Early life and education ==
Almond Chu was the eldest son of his family. When he was a kid, he received a camera as gift from his father and it explored his vision through the lens. Almond found his interest in visual arts when he was a teenager. He started his studies on oil painting but gave up finally when he discovered that he just learned a western technique without any spiritual enrichment.

In 1983, he went to Tokyo and continued his studies in fine-art photography at the Tokyo College of Photography. The most influential person for him was his Japanese teacher Iizawa Kôrarô, who is recognized as a leading expert among Japanese photography critics. His studies and the living style there not only fulfilled his persuasion of artistic nourishment, but also led him to practice the spirit of ‘simplicity’.

== Career and style ==
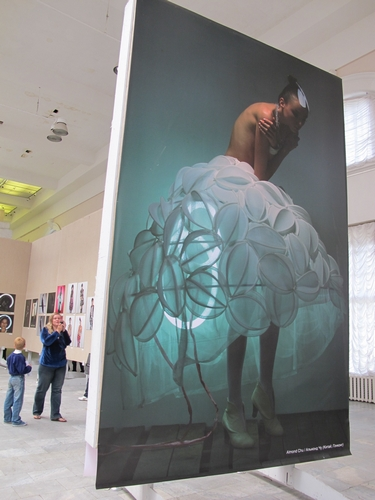
Another Skin by Almond CHU : Photo Vernissage Trend, Central Exhibition Hall Manege, St. Petersburg, Russia 2010

In 1993, he was awarded Agfa Fellowship Young Photographer Award by Asian Culture Council and stayed in New York. At the same year, he set up his own studio in Hong Kong and started his work on art and commercial projects.

He has been invited to exhibit his work in various countries such as Germany, Italy, Denmark, Canada, Russia, Japan, China, Hong Kong, Singapore and New Zealand. Besides, his work has been featured in numerous international publications. In 2004, he was invited to be one of the prominent speakers of the Internationally Literary and Aesthetic Symposium organized by Bonn University and the Art & Exhibition Hall of Deutschland, Germany. In 2005, he founded the art photography organization pH5 Photo Group which focused in promoting art photography in Hong Kong. In 2007, he founded the art photography magazine pHi and was appointed as the editor-in-chief.

In addition to fine art photography, Almond is also a curator. In 2011, he was invited to be one of the major curators for the large-scale photo exhibition titled “Different Dimension – the International Festival of contemporary photography” at Novosibirsk State Art Museum in Russia.

== Parade ==
Before the end of 2000, Almond was known by his black and white photographs and his dark room technique. In the years after, he started his conceptual series Parade and adapted digital technique to edit and enhance his work so as to achieve the surreal phenomenon. The series stages imaginary parades, formed in fact of repetitions of a single individual, always taking place in historically and socially symbolical places, such as the government offices or the Apple store. Since 1997, Almond Chu had developed this series and his gallerist in Hong-Kong La Galerie encouraged him to continue this historical and existential work of testimony.

== Selected solo exhibitions ==
- 2013
  - The Bride with White Hair, Fabricated Mortals, Dali International Photo Festival, Dali, China
  - The Urbanites, Prosperity Tower, Hong Kong
- 2012 Future and the Past - Self-Portrait by Almond Chu, Lumenvisum Gallery, Hong Kong
- 2009 Flashes of Life, Fringe Club, Hong Kong
- 2008 Falling Poetry (a video installation with Ann Mak), Lee Hysan Concert Hall, Chinese University, Hong Kong
- 2008 Wet Wet Kids - Cosplay Generation, Shanghai Street Artspace, Hong Kong
- 2003 Passionate Moment, Taikoo Place, Hong Kong
- 2002 Body Work, Fluid Living, Toronto, Canada
- 2001 Nudes & Flowers: Viva Forma, Fotogalerie Central and Montblanc Gallery at the Fringe Club, Hong Kong
- 2000
  - Traces, Wurth-Gallery at Goethe-Institut, Hong Kong
  - Life Still, LeeFotogallery, Toronto, Canada
- 1999 Life Still, OP Fotogallery, Hong Kong
- 1998 Existence + Revelation, Para/Site Art Space, Hong Kong
- 1994
  - Almond Chu Portraits – Asian Artists in New York, Agfa Gallery at Goethe-Institut, Hong Kong
  - Circle of Colors (with sculptor, Yin Peet), Hong Kong Academy of Performing Arts, Hong Kong
- 1993 Portrait of Life (with sculptor, Antonio Mak), Hong Kong Arts Centre, Hong Kong
- 1990 Portraits, Le Cadre Gallery, Hong Kong
- 1987 Isolated Object, The Fringe Club

== Selected group exhibitions ==
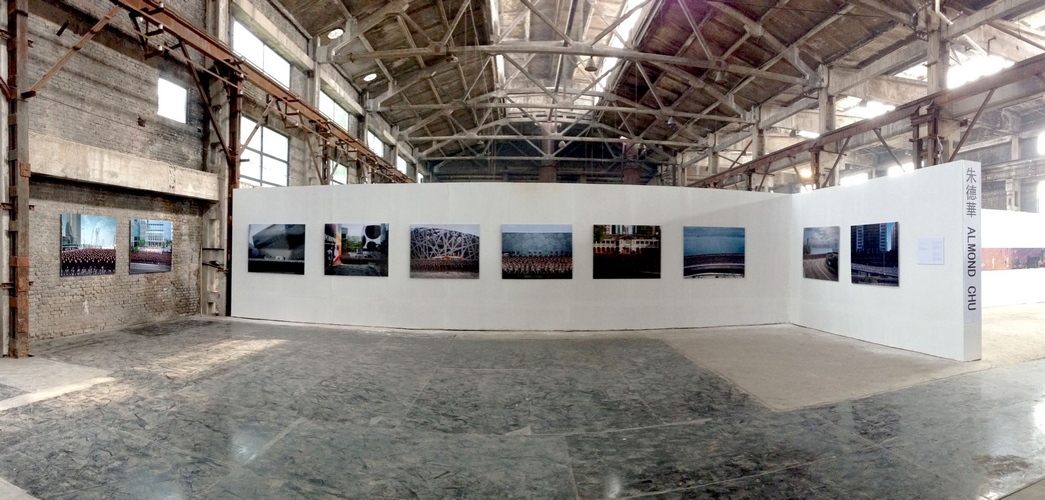
Parade Series by Almond CHU : Pingyao International Photo Festival, Pingyao Ancient City, China 2013

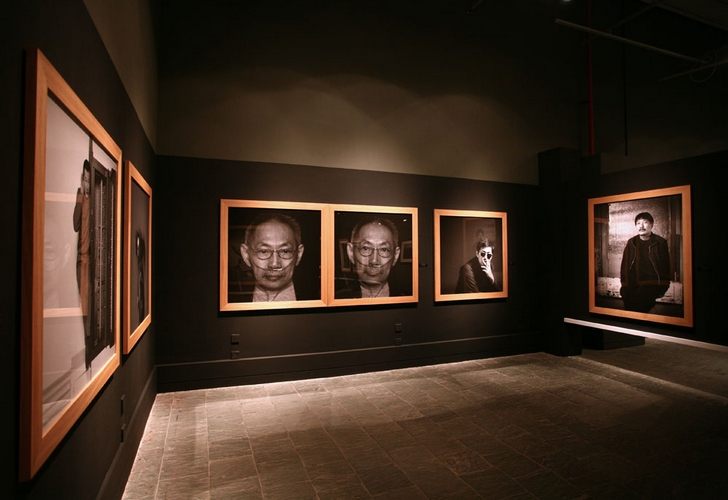
Portraits by Almond CHU : Camera Inside-out, Hong Kong Heritage Museum 2007

- 2016
  - Parades, La Galerie, Hong-Kong
- 2015
  - City of Ruins and Artificial Landscapes, Galerie Nationale de la Tapisserie, Beauvais, France
- 2014
  - Face, Samara Art Museum, Russia
  - Prudential Eye Awards Exhibition, Suntec City, Singapore
  - City Confusion II, Pingyao International Photography Festival, Pingyao Ancient City, China
- 2013
  - City Confusion I, Pingyao International Photography Festival, Pingyao Ancient City, China
  - Face, SFA Galleries, Nacogdoches, Texas, USA
  - Spring, (with Daido Moriyama, Araki Nobuyoshi, Erwin Olaf etc) AO Vertical Art Space, Hong Kong
  - On Hong Kong, Photohub Manometr, Moscow, Russia
- 2012
  - Arezzo & Fotographia Biennale, Arezzo, Italy
  - Different Dimension - The International Festival of Contemporary Photography, Novosibirsk State Art Museum, Novosibirsk, Russia
  - Beyond the Portrait, Hong Kong Heritage Museum, Hong Kong
  - Face, Manomentr Gallery, Moscow, Russia
- 2011
  - Brand New Perspectives, Hong Kong International Art Fair, Hong Kong
  - Legacy And Creations - Art Vs Art, Hong Kong Museum of Art, Hong Kong
  - Urban Utopia, Deutsche Bank, Hong Kong
- 2010
  - Photo Vernissage Trend, Central Exhibition Hall Manege, St. Petersburg, Russia
  - Legacy and Creations - Art vs Art, Museum of Contemporary Art Shanghai, Shanghai, China
  - City Flaneur, Hong Kong Heritage Museum, Hong Kong
  - New Vision: New Colours, Hong Kong Museum of Art, Hong Kong
  - Magnificent Images, OCT Art & Design Gallery, Shenzhen, China
  - Hong Kong. City, Times Square, Shanghai, China
  - Jinan International Photography Biennale, Jinan, China
- 2008
  - Imaging Hong Kong, Hong Kong Central Library, Hong Kong
  - ARTSingapore, SUNTEC, Singapore
- 2007
  - Camera Inside-out, Hong Kong Heritage Museum, Hong Kong
  - Hong Kong Institute of Professional Photographers Asia Photo Awards Exhibition
    - 798 Photo Gallery, Beijing, China
    - Eslite Vision, Eslite Bookshop, Taipei, Taiwan
    - National Library, Singapore
    - Macau Military Club, Macau
- 2006
  - Hong Kong Four-Cast, Guangdong Museum of Art, Guangzhou, China
  - Festival dell'ARTE', Carrera, Italy
  - Lianzhou International Photo Festival, Lianzhou, China
  - Chinese Photographers Association International Photo Exhibition, Great Hall of the People, Beijing, China
  - megARTstore, Hong Kong Heritage Museum, Hong Kong
- 2005
  - Hong Kong Art Biennial, Hong Kong Museum of Art, Hong Kong
  - Hong Kong Four-Cast, University Museum and Art Gallery, The University of Hong Kong, Hong Kong
  - Walk Don't Run, 1a Space, Hong Kong
- 2004
  - International Symposium of Art and Aesthetic, Art & Exhibition Hall of Deutschland, Bonn, Germany
  - Toronto Alternative Art Fair International, Drake Hotel, Toronto, Canada
  - Building Hong Kong Redwhiteblue, Hong Kong Heritage Museum, Hong Kong
  - Dislocation Re-launch Exhibition, Lee Ka-sing Gallery, Toronto, Canada
- 2003
  - The 7th International Art Fair, Jockey Club Auditorium, The University of The Hong Kong Polytechnic
  - Art Mart, 1/5 Bar & Para/Site Art Space, Hong Kong
- 2002
  - Toronto International Art Fair, Toronto, Canada
  - Hong Kong Institute of Professional Photographers Annual Exhibition, Guangzhou Library, Guangzhou, China
- 2001
  - Paella, Lee Ka-sing Gallery, Toronto, Canada
  - Art Window, Bodyshop, Hong Kong
  - Bundles Of Paper, John Batten Gallery, Hong Kong
  - Snap Shot Exhibition, e-Art Gallery, Hong Kong
- 2000
  - Bodywork, (with Araki Nobuyoshi, Evangelo Costadimas, Mamoru Horiguchi & Paul Sabol) Lee Fotogallery, Toronto, Canada
  - Salon d’Hiver III, Gallerie Martini, Hong Kong
  - Movement Collection, Shatin Town Hall, Hong Kong
- 1999
  - Big Act In Oil Street, Forma GSD, Oil Street, Hong Kong
  - Too Much, Too Little, 1a Space, Hong Kong
- 1998
  - Eye On The Fringe, Fringe Festival, The Fringe Club, Hong Kong
  - On Hong Kong, Fringe Festival, City Hall, Hong Kong
  - OP Editions Prints, Printz Gallery, Kyoto, Japan
- 1997
  - Hong Kong Handover Art Exhibition, Convention & Exhibition Centre, Hong Kong
  - Nude Quartet, Galerie Martini, Hong Kong
  - Forty OP Editions Prints, The Fringe Club, Hong Kong
- 1996
  - New China New Zealand, New Zealand International Festival Of The Arts, Wellington, New Zealand
  - New Images From Hong Kong
    - Tower Gallery, Yokohama, Japan
    - Printz Gallery, Kyoto, Japan
    - Artium Gallery, Fuguoka, Japan
- 1995
  - Kina Kina Kina – Moderne Fotografi fra Kina, Hong Kong og Taiwan, Scandinavian Center Aarhus, Denmark
  - APA Japan Photo Biennale, Ueno Museum, Tokyo, Japan
  - Polaroid Experience Of Visual Art, Printz Gallery, Pacific Place, Hong Kong
  - Phallic Contemporary Art, The Fringe Club, Hong Kong
- 1994
  - Contemporary Photography from Mainland China, Hong Kong and Taiwan, Hong Kong Arts Festival, Hong Kong Arts Centre, Hong Kong
  - City Colors, City University of Hong Kong, Hong Kong
  - Hong Kong-Sydney-Hong Kong, The Fringe Club, Hong Kong
- 1993
  - Anatomy Of A Sandwich, mobile exhibition, Hong Kong Arts Festival, Hong Kong
  - Visions, Lan Kwai Fong, Hong Kong
  - Arts In June, Hong Kong Cultural Centre, Hong Kong

== Public and private collectors ==
- Hong Kong Museum of Art
- Hong Kong Heritage Museum
- Guangdong Museum of Art, Guangzhou
- University Museum and Art Gallery of the University of Hong Kong
- OCT Art & Design Gallery Shenzhen
- Osage Gallery
- Lee Hysan Foundation
- Deutsche Bank
- Mandarin Oriental Hotel Taipei
- Peninsula Hotel Hong Kong
- New World Development Co Ltd
- Cathay Pacific Airways
- Hotel LKF
- Agfa-Gavert Hong Kong Ltd
- Private Collections

== Residencies ==
- Akademie Schloss Solitude, Stuttgart, Germany 2003
- Asian Cultural Council, New York, United States 1993

== Books ==
- The Urbanites Almond Chu, published by MCCM Creations 2013, Hong Kong, ISBN 978-988-15218-3-5
- Almond Chu Asian Artists Portrait, a handmade photo album specially for Asia Art Archive Collection, Hong Kong
- Hong Kong/China Photographers Three Almond Chu by Wolfgang Kubin, published by Asia One Products & Publishing Ltd 2009, Hong Kong, ISBN 978-988-17998-2-1
- Horse, limited edition handmade portfolio by Asia One Products & Publishing Ltd, Hong Kong

== Publications ==
- The No Colours, published by Hatjie Cantz Verlag 2014, Germany
- 13th China Pingyao International Photography Festival, published by China Photographic Publishing House 2013, Beijing, China
- The 5th Dali International Photography Festival, published by China Tushu Publishing Ltd 2013, Shenzhen, China
- Hong Kong Eye – Contemporary Hong Kong Art, published by Skira Editore S.p.A. 2012, Italy
- Beyond The Portrait, published by Leisure and Cultural Services Department 2012, Hong Kong
- Urban Utopia, Deutsche Bank Collection Hong Kong, published by Deutsche Bank AG, Frankfurt am Main 2011, Germany
- Legacy And Creations – Art Vs Art, published by the Leisure and Cultural Services Department of the Hong Kong SAR Government 2010, Hong Kong
- Hong Kong. City – Photo Exhibition at Shanghai Expo 2010, published by Hong Kong Institute of Professional Photographers Ltd, Hong Kong
- Imaging Hong Kong: Contemporary Photography Exhibition, published by pH5 Photo Group 2008, Hong Kong
- Nude Photography: The Art and the craft, published by Dorling Kindersley 2008, London, Great Britain
- Fabricated Mortals, exhibition catalogue, published by Osage Gallery 2007, Hong Kong
- Nude Bible, published by Tectum Publishers 2007, Belgium
- Qigong Meditation, text by Philip Marcovici, published by New Strategy Ltd, Hong Kong
- Photographing China – Highlight of 50 Years of Chinese Photography, published by China Photographic Publishing House 2006, Beijing, China
- Lianzhou International Photo Festival, published by Guangdong People’s Publishing House 2006, China
- Hong Kong Four Casts, published by Hong Kong University Press 2005, Hong Kong
- Hong Kong Art Biennial Exhibition 2005, published by the Leisure and Cultural Services Department 2005, Hong Kong
- Body Work, e-book, published by Ocean Pound, Toronto, Canada
- Nudes Index I, published by Konemann Verlagsgesellschaft mbH 2001, Cologne, Germany
- Life Still, exhibition catalogue, published by OP Foto Gallery 1999, Hong Kong
- Nudes 3, published by Graphis Inc. 2000, Swiss/US
- Ecco Homo, published by Vertigo Publishers 2000, Barcelona, Spain
- Almond Chu Photography, portfolio, published by Almond Chu Photography, Hong Kong
- Almond Chu Portraits - Asian Artists in New York, published by Anway Communications Co. 1994, Hong Kong
- Portrait of Life, exhibition catalogue, published by Antonio Mak and Almond Chu 1993, Hong Kong
