= Barbara Almond =

American psychiatrist

- Born: Barbara Mary Rosenthal; June 6, 1938; The Bronx, New York City
- Died: March 6, 2016 (aged 77); Palo Alto, California
- Education: Antioch College, Yale University
- Known for: The Monster Within: The Hidden Side of Motherhood
- Scientific career
- Fields: Psychiatry

Barbara Almond (June 6, 1938 – March 6, 2016) was an American psychiatrist and psychoanalyst. She authored books on psychiatry, including The Monster Within: The Hidden Side of Motherhood (2010).

== Biography ==
Almond was born Barbara Mary Rosenthal in The Bronx. Her father was an actuary, and her mother was a teacher. She attended The High School of Music & Art in Manhattan before graduating from Antioch College and Yale University Medical School. Almond had a private practice in Palo Alto, California, and taught at Stanford University and the San Francisco Center for Psychoanalysis.

With her husband Richard, also a psychiatrist, Almond wrote The Therapeutic Narrative, a book about psychiatric conditions in literary characters. In 2010, she authored The Monster Within: The Hidden Side of Motherhood, which discussed the feelings of ambivalence that women often held toward motherhood. In a review in The Washington Post, Carolyn See wrote that Almond "calms the reader, suggesting that we can only do our best and trust that our ambivalence is more than compensated for by our devotion and love."

Almond and her husband were married for 53 years. In her leisure time, Almond played piano. She was diagnosed with bladder cancer in early 2015 and continued practicing psychiatry until two months before her death.
