= Almond potato =

Variety of potato

Potato 'Almond'
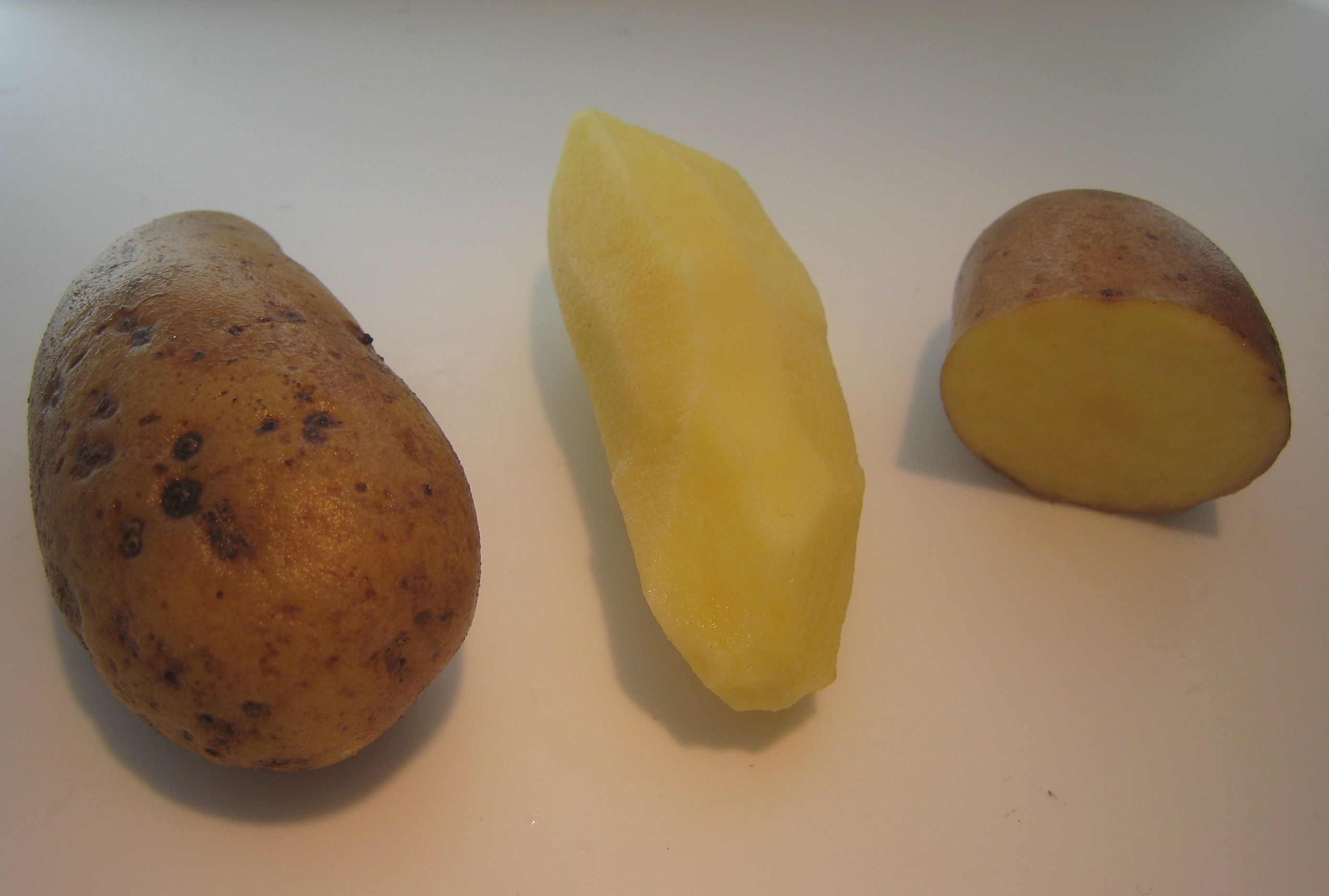
- 'Almond' potatoes
- Species: Solanum tuberosum
- Cultivar: 'Almond'
- Origin: Finland, Sweden, Norway

The almond potato (Norwegian: Mandelpotet, Swedish: Mandelpotatis, Finnish: puikulaperuna), also called Mandel potato or Swedish peanut fingerling, is a potato known since the 19th century. Almond potatoes are yellow or white; in rare cases a variety called blue almond (Blå mandel in Swedish) can be found which has yellow-white flesh with blue skin. Its shape is oval and somewhat resembles an almond, hence the name. Blue almond is an old variety which was grown in the northern regions of Sweden before the yellow-peeled almond potato was introduced.

It is considered a delicacy in Norway, Finland and Sweden, where it is most commonly grown in the northern regions. It can be grown better in the north, since the variety is susceptible to plant diseases in the south. Finnish Lapland puikula (Lapin puikula) has a European Union and UK Protected Designation of Origin.
