= Jeanie Almond =

Trap shooter of USA

Jeanie Almond (a.k.a. Mama Shotgun or Mama Jeanie) is a national champion trap shooter and the first woman to win this title. She is the founder of Lipstick and Lead, an organization dedicated to the education and empowerment of women shooters, and has been teaching shooting and gun safety for over 46 years.

== Career ==
Almond was the general manager of one of the largest gun ranges in Texas for nine years, and is now the event coordinator. She hosts more than 100 corporate and charity events per year.

Almond is President of the Youth Target Foundation, a 501(C)3 nonprofit. She is the founder of Lipstick and Lead, an organization dedicated to the education and empowerment of women shooters. She has been teaching shooting and gun safety for over 46 years.

She is an NRA-certified rifle, pistol, and shotgun instructor; range safety officer; and home firearm and safety instructor. She is also a certified 4H shotgun instructor.

Almond is passionate about educating women, and has many classes designed specifically for women. She has also created her own set of how-to DVDs in a series called Lipstick and Lead. The series teaches women about shotgun and handgun shooting, using female instructors.

A larger than life character, Almond has appeared on various television shows including Auction Hunters, where she was asked to determine the history of a gun found in an abandoned storage unit.

People in Dallas often notice her because of her truck fully wrapped in pink camouflage. The truck has a large banner that says "Shoot Like a Girl". Almond is often sought out by celebrities and sports stars for shooting lessons.

== Personal life ==
Almond is a mother of seven children and grandmother to 23 grandchildren.

Her first husband, Ken Robertson, was a champion trap shooter in California for many years. He made a series of how-to videos on skeet shooting in the eighties for Pachmayr. Almond's son, Scott Robertson, is a professional sporting clay shooter and national champion as well. He was winning High-Over-All in major shoots when he was in his teens, and now is a star of the Outdoor Channel's Wild and Raw.
