= Auction Hunters =

- Genre: Reality
- Starring: Allen Lee Haff; Ton Jones
- Country of origin: United States
- Original language: English
- No. of seasons: 5
- No. of episodes: 107 (list of episodes)

Production
- Executive producers: Scott Gurney; Deirdre Gurney
- Camera setup: Multiple
- Running time: 22 minutes
- Production company: Gurney Productions

Original release
- Network: Spike
- Release: November 9, 2010 – May 9, 2015

Auction Hunters is an American reality television series that premiered on November 9, 2010, on Spike.

In June 2011, Spike announced that it had ordered a third season of Auction Hunters with 26 episodes. In August 2012, Spike announced that it had ordered a fourth season of 26 episodes. The fourth season premiered on January 30, 2013 as Auction Hunters: Pawnshop Edition and focused not only on storage auctions, but also Haff and Jones running a pawn Shop named Haff-Ton Pawn Shop. On April 11, 2014, Spike ordered a 20-episode fifth season that premiered in late 2014. Season 5 encompasses the duo as they expand their business past storage unit auctions. On April 8, 2015, Spike announced that season five would be the final season, which made the program the longest-running nonscripted show on Spike at the time.

== Summary ==
The show follows Allen Haff, and Clinton Jones (aka 'Ton'), who have experience in a variety of fields including guns and mystery safes, as they participate in storage unit auctions throughout Southern California and occasionally other locations around the United States. Each episode leads viewers through the pair's activities of bidding on and winning abandoned storage units, appraising the items found within, and selling the most lucrative and interesting pieces to experts or collectors.

Each episode begins with a text disclaimer stating that Haff and Jones purchase hundreds of units each year, and that only their rarest and most valuable finds are presented on the show. They claim that most of their units end up making little to no money, and that in fact they follow the 80%/20% rule in that they make 80% of their profit from 20% of the units they buy.

Recurring cast member Robin "Big Sis" Matte died on May 12, 2014, at the age of 37 from stage 4 ovarian cancer that moved to her lungs. She was a 12-year survivor. A memorial appeared at the end of the first episode of the 5th season.

== Episodes ==
Season	Episodes	Originally aired	
Season	Episodes	First aired	Last aired
1	8	November 9, 2010	December 21, 2010
2	27	April 5, 2011	November 29, 2011
3	26	March 21, 2012	September 26, 2012
4	26	January 30, 2013	March 29, 2014
5	20	October 11, 2014	May 9, 2015

== Reception ==
S. Jhoanna Robledo from Common Sense Media gave the show 3 out of 5 stars.
