= STO =

STO may refer to:

== Businesses and organizations ==
=== Government ===
- NATO Science and Technology Organization
- Service du travail obligatoire, French men & women between certain ages deported to Germany during WWII to work as slave labour
- Sojourner Truth Organization, a defunct American leftist group
- Sovet Truda i Oborony (Совет труда и обороны): Council of Labor and Defense, a Soviet central planning agency of the 1920s
- United States Air Force Special Tactics Officer

=== Non-governmental organizations ===
- State Trading Organization, a publicly owned Maldivian company
- Statoil, a publicly traded Norwegian oil company

== Science and technology ==
- Semi-automatic train operation
- Slater-type orbital, atomic orbitals
- STO-nG basis sets, of orbitals

== Sports ==
- Space Tornado Ogawa, a professional wrestling throw
- SportsTime Ohio, a regional sports network in northeast Ohio, United States

== Arts and entertainment ==
- Soldiers of the One, a group in the TV series Caprica
- Star Trek Online, a massively multiplayer online role-playing game
- STO, a posture emoticon used for representing a great admiration or great despair, see Emoticon#Orz
- Sto, pen name of illustrator Sergio Tofano

== Transport ==
- Société de transport de l'Outaouais, a public transit operator in Gatineau, Quebec, Canada
- STO, the National Rail station code for South Tottenham railway station, London, England
- The airports of Stockholm, Sweden, by IATA code

== Other uses ==
- Safe Torque Off, an electronic signal used in industrial drives for safety function
- Security through obscurity, a practice in security engineering
- Security token offering, a type of public offering in which tokenized digital securities, are sold in cryptocurrency exchanges
- Stø, a village in Norway
- Stoney language (ISO 639-3 code)
- STO (professional wrestling), a maneuver in professional wrestling

== See also ==
- STOS (disambiguation)
