= Ha =

Ha may refer to:

== Agencies and organizations ==
- Health authority, a former type of administrative organisation of the NHS in England and Wales
- Hells Angels Motorcycle Club
- Highways Agency (renamed Highways England, now National Highways), UK government body maintaining England's major roads
- Homelessness Australia, peak body organisation for homeless people and services
- Homosexuals Anonymous an ex-gay program for dealing with unwanted same-sex attractions
- Hong Kong Housing Authority
- Hospital Authority of Hong Kong

== Arts, entertainment, and media ==
- Ha (Doseone album), 2005
- Ha (Talvin Singh album), 2002
- Ha! (Killing Joke album), 1982
- "Ha" (21 Savage song)
- "Ha" (Juvenile song)
- Ha! (TV channel), an American all-comedy TV channel
- Hamar Arbeiderblad, a Norwegian newspaper
- Hollywood Arts, a 2026 American teen sitcom
- Human Action, a book by the Austrian economist Ludwig von Mises
- The Jim Henson Company, formerly known as ha!

== Language ==
- A laugh
- Ha (Javanese) (ꦲ), a letter in the Javanese script
- Ha (kana), in syllabic Japanese script
- ه (hāʾ), ح (ḥāʾ), or خ (ḫāʾ), Arabic letters
- హ (ha), a Telugu letter
- Ha language, the language of the Ha people in eastern Africa
- Hausa language, ISO 639-1 code HA

== Places ==
- Ha, Bhutan
- Hå Municipality, a municipality in Rogaland county, Norway
- Ha Gorge, Greece
- HA postcode area, a group of English postal districts in north-west London
- Henan, a province of China (Guobiao abbreviation HA)

== Science and technology ==
=== Chemistry ===
- Hahnium, an element now called Dubnium
- Hyaluronan (Hyaluronic acid), a carbohydrate structure
- Hydroxylapatite, a mineral

=== Medicine ===
- Hyperandrogenic anovulation, also called polyendocrine metabolic ovarian syndrome (PMOS), or formerly polycystic ovary syndrome (PCOS)
- Health anxiety (HA) or hypochondriasis (hypochondria)
- Hemagglutinin (influenza) (HA), an antigenic glycoprotein from Influenza viruses
- Hemagglutination assay, a measurement of viruses or bacteria

=== Units of measure ===
- Hartree, an atomic unit of energy
- Hectare (ha), a unit of area
- Hectoampere, a unit of electric current

=== Other uses in science and technology ===
- ha (function prefix) (half), a prefix for some trigonometric functions in mathematics
- Hallstatt culture, an archaeological culture
- High availability, systems design and implementation with a view to maximising service
- Hour angle, in astronomy, one of the coordinates of the equatorial coordinate system
- H_{a}, or alternative hypothesis, in statistical testing
- H-alpha (Hα), a deep-red visible spectral line of the hydrogen atom

== Surnames ==
- Ha (Chinese surname) (哈), found in the Hundred Family Surnames
- Ha (Korean surname) (하, 河 or 夏)
- Hà, Vietnamese surname
- Xia (surname) (夏), romanized as Ha in Cantonese, Korean and Vietnamese pronunciation

== Transportation ==
- British Rail Class 71, a locomotive (classified type HA under the Southern Region's pre-TOPS scheme)
- Hawaiian Airlines, former IATA designator HA
- Highways Agency (now National Highways), UK government body maintaining England's major roads
- Hungary (aircraft registration prefix HA)

== Other uses ==
- Ha (mythology)
- Ha, one of deities Heng and Ha
- Ha people, a Tanzanian people
- Hospitalman Apprentice, a U.S. Navy rank

== See also ==
- Haa (disambiguation)
- Haha (disambiguation)
- Has (disambiguation)
