= 1s Slater-type function =

Mathematical function used to approximate atomic orbitals in quantum chemistry

In quantum chemistry and physics, a 1s Slater-type function is a simple mathematical function used to approximate the distribution of a single electron in its lowest energy level, or 1s orbital, within an atom. Such functions are a type of Slater-type orbital (STO). They offer a balance between accuracy and computational simplicity, making them a common component in the description of multi-electron atoms and molecules.

The key idea behind a Slater-type function is that the probability of finding an electron decreases exponentially with its distance from the atom's nucleus. This provides a qualitatively correct, though not perfectly accurate, picture of an electron's behavior. While an exact description of an electron's orbital (like in the hydrogen atom) can be calculated, these calculations become far too complex for atoms with many electrons. STOs provide a practical approximation for these more complex systems.

The 1s Slater-type function is particularly notable because it can exactly describe the ground state of a hydrogen-like atom if its parameters are chosen correctly.

== Mathematical form ==
A 1s Slater-type orbital is centered on a nucleus at position R and is defined by the equation
$$\psi_{1s}(\zeta, \mathbf{r} - \mathbf{R}) = \left(\frac{\zeta^3}{\pi}\right)^{1/2} \, e^{-\zeta |\mathbf{r} - \mathbf{R}|},$$
where $|\mathbf{r} - \mathbf{R}|$ is the distance of the electron from the nucleus, and $\zeta$ (zeta) is the Slater orbital exponent, a parameter that controls how "spread out" or "compact" the orbital is. A larger $\zeta$ value pulls the electron distribution closer to the nucleus, corresponding to a higher nuclear charge or a more tightly bound electron. The term $e^{-\zeta |\mathbf{r} - \mathbf{R}|}$ represents the characteristic exponential decay of the function with distance. The term $(\zeta^3/\pi)^{1/2}$ is a normalization constant which ensures that the total probability of finding the electron somewhere in space is equal to 1.

This function corresponds to a Slater-type orbital where the principal quantum number n is 1. Related sets of functions can be used to construct STO-nG basis sets which are widely used in computational chemistry.

== Applications for hydrogen-like atomic systems ==
A hydrogen-like atom or a hydrogenic atom is an atom with one electron. Except for the hydrogen atom itself (which is neutral), these atoms carry positive charge $(Z - 1)e$, where $Z$ is the atomic number of the atom. Because hydrogen-like atoms are two-particle systems with an interaction depending only on the distance between the two particles, their (non-relativistic) Schrödinger equation can be exactly solved in analytic form. The solutions are one-electron functions and are referred to as hydrogen-like atomic orbitals.

The electronic Hamiltonian (in atomic units) of a hydrogenic system is
$$\hat{H}_e = -\frac{\nabla^2}{2} - \frac{Z}{r},$$
The 1s electron of a hydrogenic systems can be accurately described by the corresponding Slater orbital:
$$\psi_{1s} = \left(\frac{\zeta^3}{\pi}\right)^{1/2} e^{-\zeta r},$$
where $\zeta$ is the Slater exponent. This state, the ground state, is the only state that can be described by a Slater orbital. Slater orbitals have no radial nodes, while the excited states of the hydrogen atom have radial nodes.

=== Exact energy of a hydrogen-like atom ===
The energy of a hydrogenic system can be exactly calculated analytically as follows:
$$E_{1s} = \frac{\langle\psi_{1s}|\mathbf{\hat{H}}_e|\psi_{1s}\rangle}
{\langle\psi_{1s}|\psi_{1s}\rangle},$$
where $\langle\psi_{1s}|\psi_{1s}\rangle = 1$ due to normalization.

Substituting end expanding $\hat{H}_e$:
$$E_{1s} = \left\langle\psi_{1s}\left| -\frac{\nabla^2}{2} - \frac{Z}{r} \right|\psi_{1s}\right\rangle,$$
$$E_{1s} = \left\langle\psi_{1s}\left| -\frac{\nabla^2}{2} \right|\psi_{1s}\right\rangle +
\left\langle\psi_{1s}\left| -\frac{Z}{r} \right|\psi_{1s}\right\rangle,$$
$$E_{1s} = \left\langle\psi_{1s}\left| -\frac{1}{2r^2} \frac{\partial}{\partial r} \left(r^2 \frac{\partial}{\partial r}\right) \right|\psi_{1s}\right\rangle +
\left\langle\psi_{1s}\left| -\frac{Z}{r} \right|\psi_{1s}\right\rangle.$$

Using the above expression for Slater orbital $\psi_{1s},$
$$E_{1s} = \left\langle \left(\frac{\zeta^3}{\pi}\right)^{1/2} e^{-\zeta r} \right|
\left. -\left(\frac{\zeta^3}{\pi}\right)^{1/2} e^{-\zeta r} \left(\frac{-2r\zeta + r^2\zeta^2}{2r^2}\right) \right\rangle +
\left\langle\psi_{1s}\left| -\frac{\mathbf Z}{r} \right|\psi_{1s}\right\rangle.$$
The integrals can be exactly solved:
$$E_{1s} = \frac{\zeta^2}{2} - \zeta Z.$$

The optimal value for $\zeta$ is obtained by demanding that the differential of the energy with respect to $\zeta$ is zero:
$$\frac{dE_{1s}}{d\zeta} = \zeta - \mathbf Z = 0,$$
which yields $\zeta = Z.$

=== Non-relativistic energy ===
The following energy values are thus calculated by using the expressions for energy and for the Slater exponent.

==== Hydrogen: H ====
$Z = 1$ and $\zeta = 1$,
E_{1s} = −0.5 E_{h} = −13.60569850 eV = −313.75450000 kcal/mol.

==== Gold: Au^{78+} ====
$Z = 79$ and $\zeta = 79$,
E_{1s} = −3120.5 E_{h} = −84913.16433850 eV = −1958141.8345 kcal/mol.

=== Relativistic energy of hydrogenic atomic systems ===
Hydrogenic atomic systems are suitable models to demonstrate the relativistic effects in atomic systems in a simple way. The energy expectation value can calculated by using the Slater orbitals with or without considering the relativistic correction for the Slater exponent $\zeta$. The relativistically corrected Slater exponent $\zeta_\text{rel}$ is
$$\zeta_\text{rel} = \frac{Z}{\sqrt{1 - Z^2/c^2}}.$$
The relativistic energy of an electron in 1s orbital of a hydrogenic atomic systems is obtained by solving the Dirac equation:
$$E_{1s}^\text{rel} = -(c^2 + Z\zeta) + \sqrt{c^4 + Z^2\zeta^2}.$$

The following table illustrates the relativistic corrections in energy, and it can be seen how the relativistic correction scales with the atomic number of the system.

Atomic system	$Z$	$\zeta_\text{non-rel}$	$\zeta_\text{rel}$	$E_{1s}^\text{non-rel}$	$E_{1s}^\text{rel}$ using $\zeta_\text{non-rel}$	$E_{1s}^\text{rel}$ using $\zeta_\text{rel}$
H	1	1	1.00002663	−0.50000000 E_{h}	−0.50000666 E_{h}	−0.50000666 E_{h}
H	1	1	1.00002663	−13.60569850 eV	−13.60587963 eV	−13.60587964 eV
H	1	1	1.00002663	−313.7545000 kcal/mol	−313.7586768 kcal/mol	−313.7586771 kcal/mol
Au^{78+}	79	79	96.68296596	−3120.50000000 E_{h}	−3343.96438929 E_{h}	−3434.58676969 E_{h}
Au^{78+}	79	79	96.68296596	−84913.1643385 eV	−90993.9425508 eV	−93459.9041210 eV
Au^{78+}	79	79	96.68296596	−1958141.83450 kcal/mol	−2098367.74996 kcal/mol	−2155234.10926 kcal/mol
