= HAV =

HAV or hav may refer to:

- Hallux abducto valgus, or bunion
- Hand arm vibrations
- Hardware-assisted virtualization
- Havant railway station, in England
- Havant RFC, an English rugby union club
- Haversine function
- Havildar, a rank in the Indian and Pakistani armies
- Havre (Amtrak station), in Montana, United States
- Havu language, spoken in the Democratic Republic of the Congo
- Hepatitis A virus
- Highly Automated Vehicle, a term for Autonomous car but also includes vehicles with Advanced driver-assistance systems features
- Hindu Aikya Vedi, a Hindu organization
- Hybrid Air Vehicles, a British manufacturer
- José Martí International Airport in Havana, Cuba
- Lifting stone, called hav in the Faroe Islands
- Hav, a fictional location in the novel Last Letters from Hav by Jan Morris
- Hav., the author abbreviation for Norwegian botanist Johan Havaas

== See also ==
- Hav (surname)
- Have (disambiguation)
