= Haas =

Haas may refer to:

== Auto racing ==
- Haas F1 Team, a 21st-century Formula 1 auto racing team
- Haas Lola, a 20th-century Formula 1 auto racing team
- Newman/Haas Racing, an Indycar auto racing team
- Haas Factory Team, a NASCAR auto racing team

== Companies and organizations ==
- Haas Automation, a machine tool company
- Haas Center for Public Service, of Stanford University in Stanford, California
- Haas School of Business at the University of California, Berkeley
- Haas Type Foundry, a Swiss manufacturer of foundry type

== Science and technology ==
- Haas (rocket), a Romanian launch system
- Haas effect, a psychoacoustic effect
- Haloacetic acids, also called "HAAs"
- de Haas–van Alphen effect, a quantum mechanical effect
- Einstein–de Haas effect
- Shubnikov–de Haas effect, a macroscopic manifestation of quantum mechanics

== Other ==
- Haas (brass instrument makers), Nuremberg, Germany based family of brass instrument makers
- Haas (name)
- Haas House, a building in Vienna, Austria
- Haas–Lilienthal House, a house in San Francisco, California
- Haas Pavilion at the University of California, Berkeley
- USS Haas (DE-424), World War II US Navy destroyer escort

== See also ==
- Team Haas (disambiguation)
- Hass (disambiguation)
- Has (disambiguation)
- HAA (disambiguation)
- H2A (disambiguation)
