= Has =

HAS or Has may refer to:

== Organizations ==
- Hawaii Audubon Society, bird conservation organization in Hawaii
- Hellenic Actuarial Society, association of actuaries in Greece
- Hubbard Association of Scientologists International, corporation founded in 1954 by L. Ron Hubbard
- Hungarian Academy of Sciences, learned society of Hungary
- People's Voice Party, or HAS PARTİ, a Turkish political party

== People ==
- Wojciech Has (1925–2000), Polish film director, screenwriter and film producer
- Has Catley (1915 – 1975), Rugby union hooker from New Zealand

== Places ==
- Has District, a district in Kukës County, Albania
- Has (municipality), a municipality in Kukës County, Albania
- Has, a town in Bhutan
- Has (region), a region in Albania and Kosovo
- Has, Novi Travnik, a village in Bosnia and Herzegovina

== Transportation ==
- Ha'il Regional Airport, the IATA code for the airport in Saudi Arabia
- Hageland Aviation Services, a regional airline in Anchorage, Alaska
- Hardened aircraft shelters, a reinforced hangar to house and protect military aircraft
- Hastings (Amtrak station), Nebraska, Amtrak station code HAS
- Hokkaido Air System, an airline at Okadama Airport, Okadama-chō, Higashi-ku, Sapporo
- Hong Kong Airport Services, airport services in Hong Kong

== Other ==
- HAS (NASDAQ), Hasbro's NASDAQ symbol
- Hana Academy Seoul, a private high school in Seoul, South Korea
- Helium atom scattering, a surface analysis technique used in materials science
- Hôpital Albert Schweitzer Haiti, a hospital in Deschapelles, Haiti
- Hsinchu American School, an international school in Hsinchu City, Taiwan
- Hyaluronan synthase, an enzyme

== See also ==
- Have (disambiguation)
- Hass (disambiguation)
- Haas (disambiguation)
