= Haad =

Haad may refer to:

- Haad Rin, a beach in Thailand
- Haad Khuad, a beach in Thailand
- Yamid Haad, Major League Baseball player
- Haad (company) Bosnian fashion company
- Haad, fictional Martian measurement in Barsoom

== See also ==
- Had (disambiguation)
