= Musée de la Musique =

French national museum

Coordinates: 48.8695°N 2.3864°E

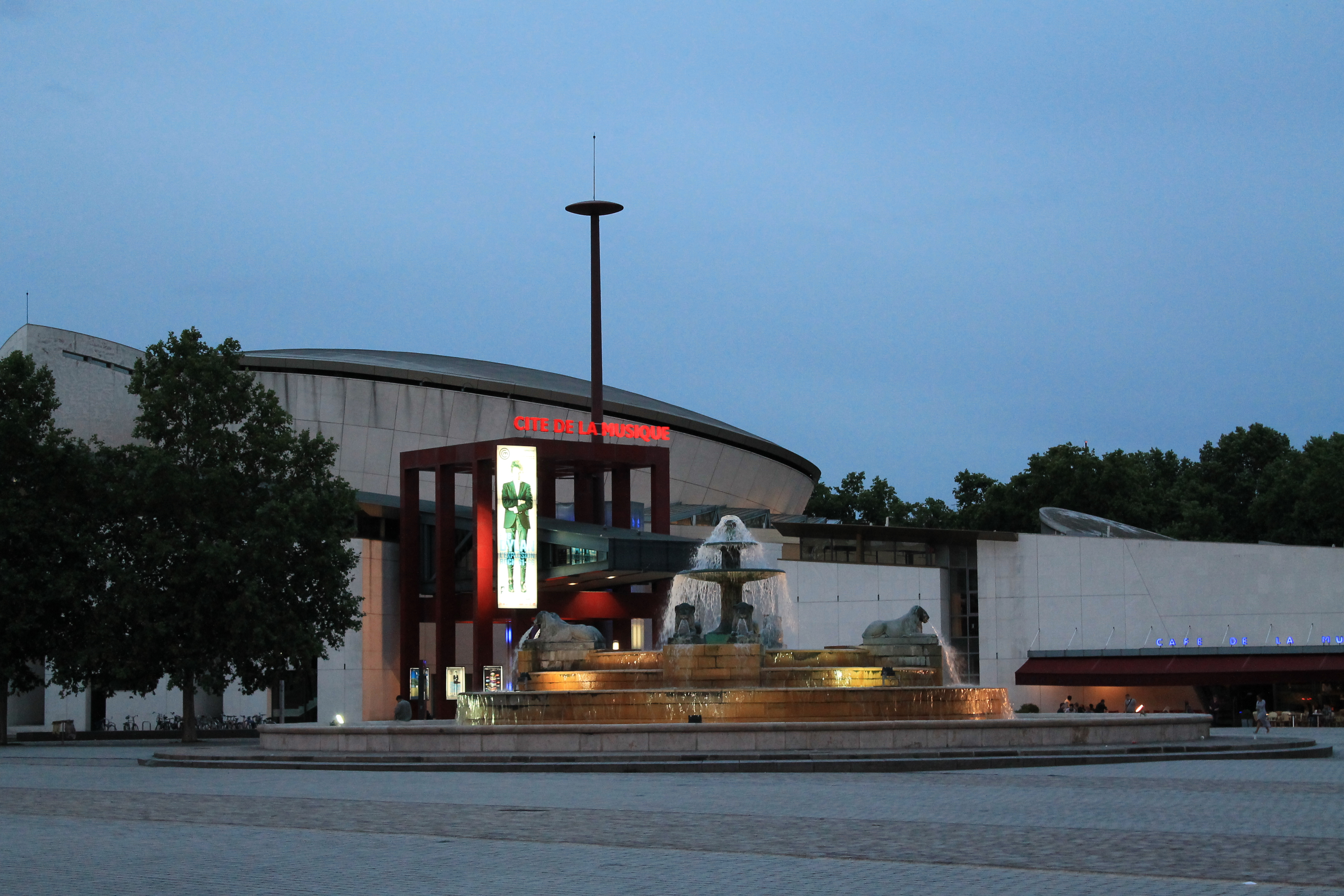
- Established: November 17, 1864
- Location: 19th arrondissement of Paris, France
- Type: Art museum, musical instrument museum
- Visitors: 413,029 (2019)
- Website: Musée de la Musique

The Musée de la Musique de la Philharmonie de Paris is a French museum in Paris, inaugurated in 1997. It has a collection of several thousand instruments and objets d'art, inherited from the Conservatoire National Supérieur de Musique de Paris, which traces the history of Western music, both learned and popular, from the 16th century onwards, and offers an overview of the world's principal musical styles.

Located in the Villette district, in the 19th arrondissement of Paris, the museum and media library occupy the garden wing of the "Philharmonie 2" building, formerly the Cité de la Musique⁣, built by Christian de Portzamparc, as part of the Philharmonie de Paris.

In addition to the thousand or so works in the permanent exhibition, presented in their geographical and historical context, the museum organizes temporary exhibitions, guided tours and free concerts, as well as early-learning workshops, promenade concerts and musical storytelling.

Finally, the Musée de la Musique, which has been awarded the "Musée de France" label, carries out a mission of conservation and research, providing access to the most recent data on ancient and modern instruments in its documentation center, which is integrated into the media library, and giving free access to its digital content via a website.

== Collections ==
=== Museum ===
The museum has a collection of more than 8,000 instruments and art objects.

In 2015, the museum itinerary defined five chapters to illustrate the main moments in the history of music since the Baroque period.

Other Paris museums complement the museum's collections, depending on their specialization, such as the Musée du Quai Branly – Jacques Chirac and its 9,128 non-European musical instruments, and the popular music instruments conserved at the MuCEM. To a lesser extent, the Musée de l'Armée also owns 349 military musical instruments, some 60 of which are displayed in a cabinet opened on December 17, 2015, including the deposit of 30 instruments from the Musée de la Musique; while the Musée du Louvre holds instruments dating back to Egyptian antiquity.

=== Resource center ===
The museum is closely linked to the Philharmonie's media library, located in the beam-shaped structure above the museum, where it houses four collections (museum collections, documentary and archival, digitized, educational and orientation) and, as of January 1, 2016, included over 80,000 documents (excluding archival holdings) and 110,000 with audiovisual recordings.

Most of the composers' autograph manuscripts were entrusted to the Bibliothèque nationale de France in 1942, for reasons of rationalization and conservation.

== Gallery ==
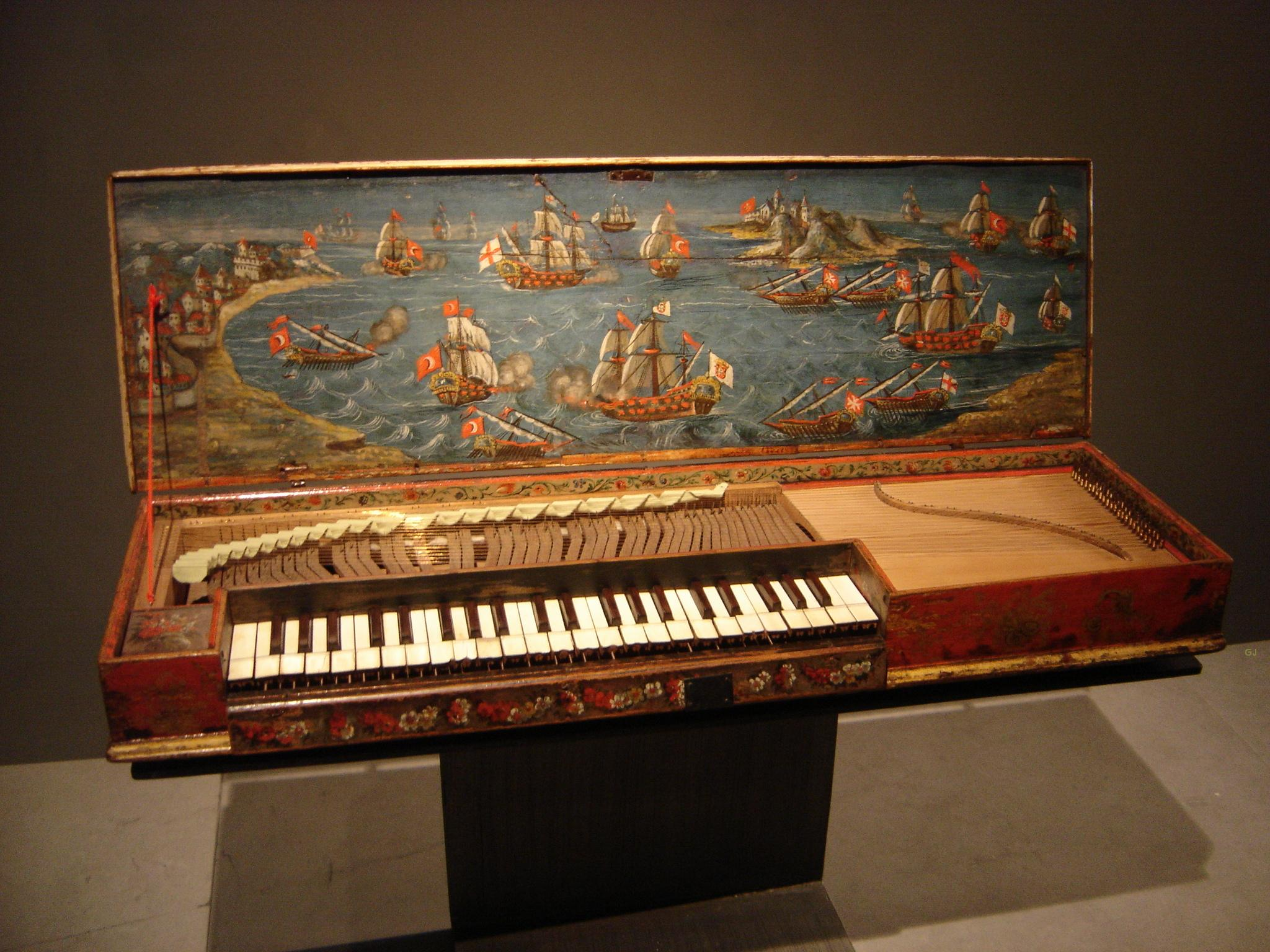
Lepanto clavichord, 16th century, Italy

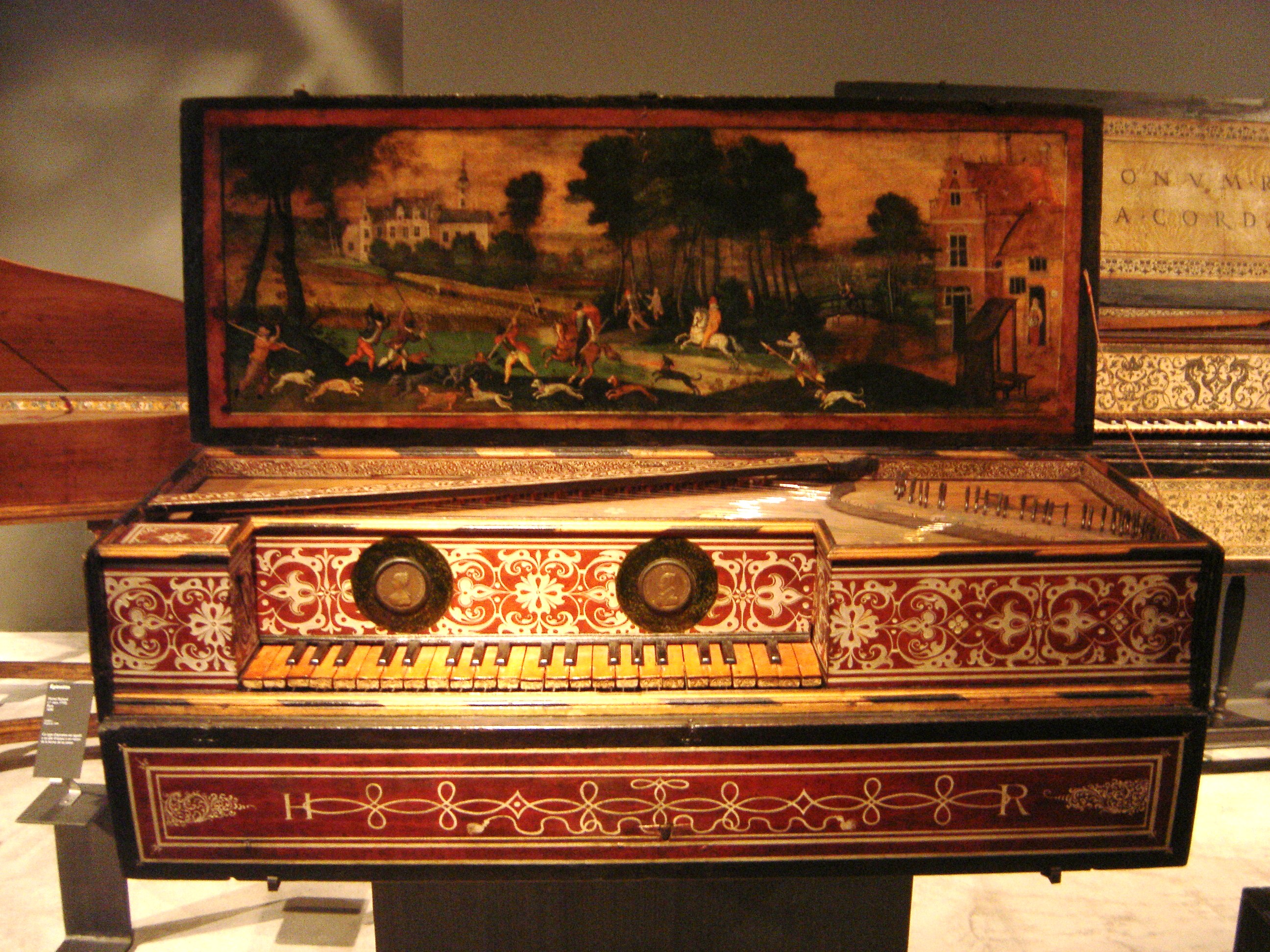
Virginale by Hans Ruckers, 1583, Antwerp

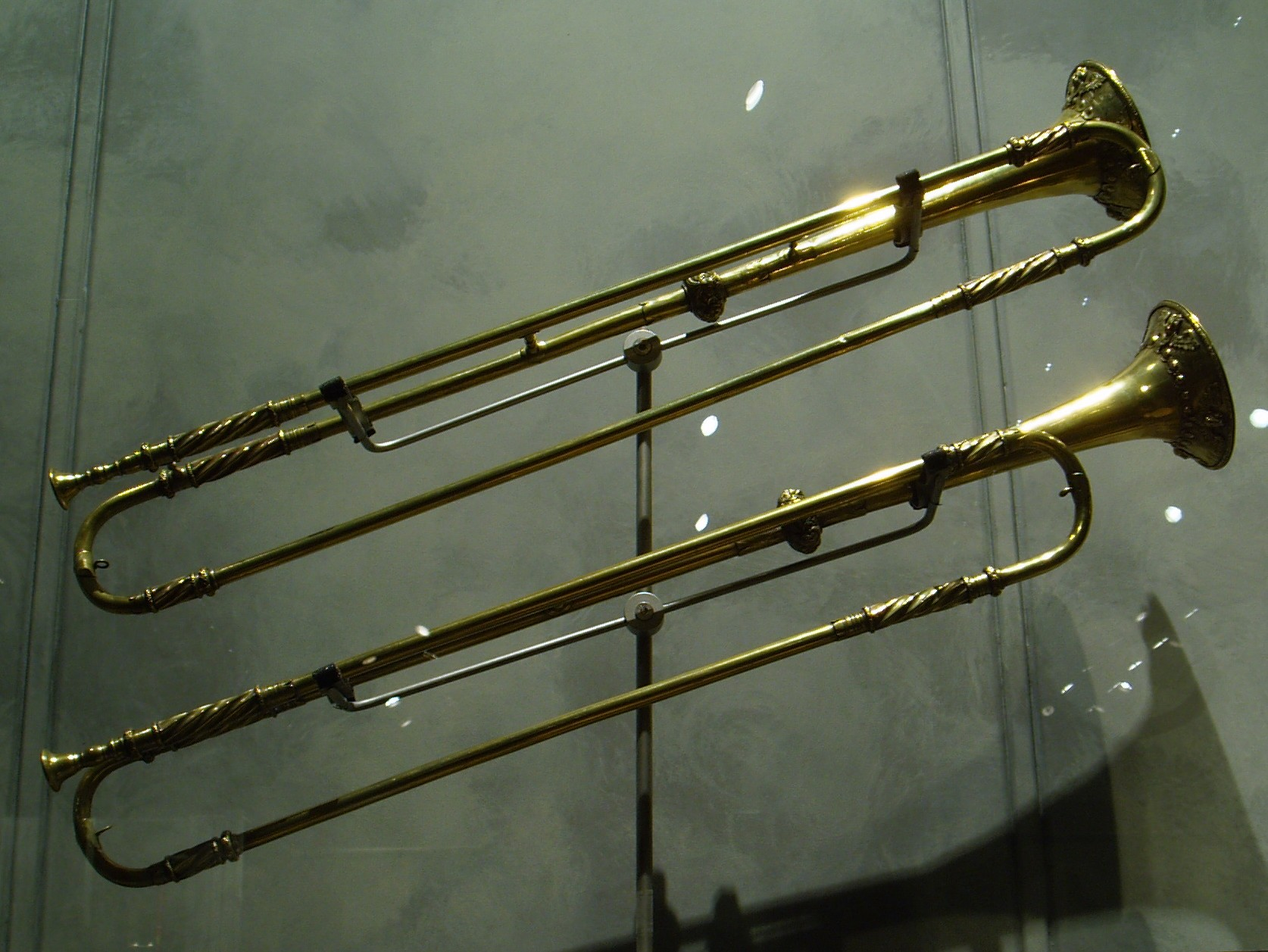
Baroque trumpets by Johann Wilhelm Haas, 1671, Nuremberg.

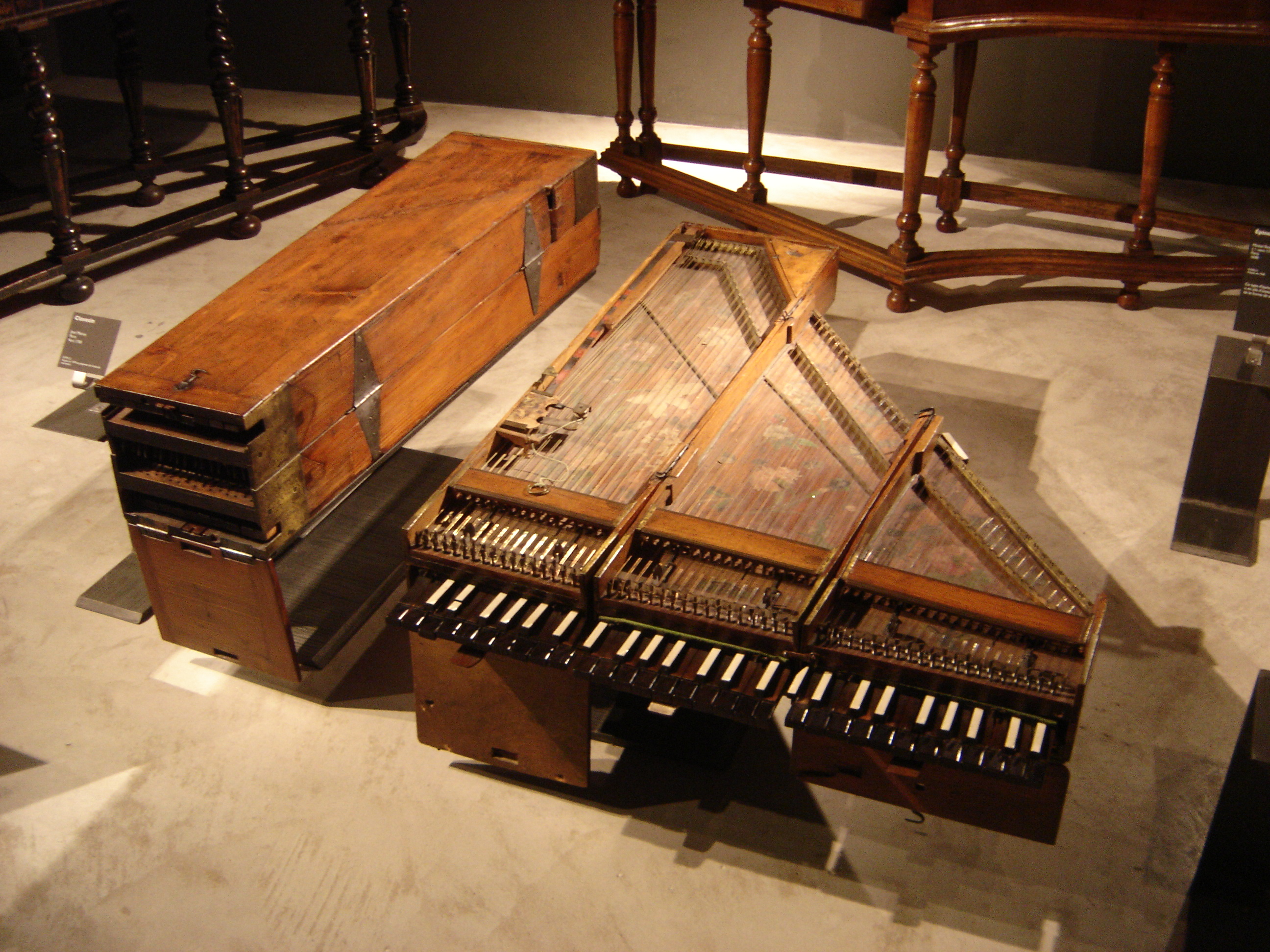
Two broken harpsichords by Jean Marius (Paris, 1700)

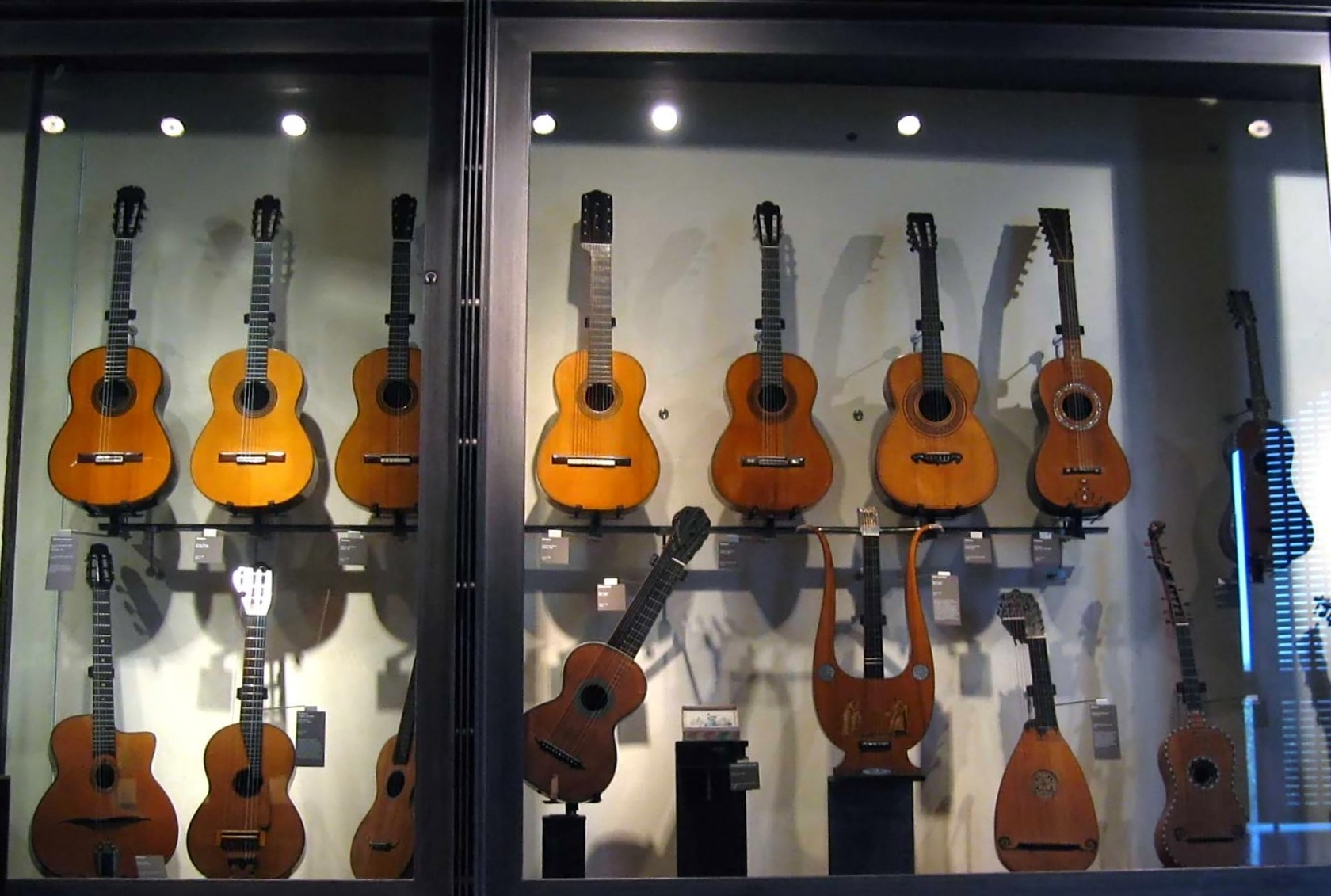
Guitars and lutes from the 19th and 20th centuries, by Antonio de Torres above and Django Reinhardt below, far left.

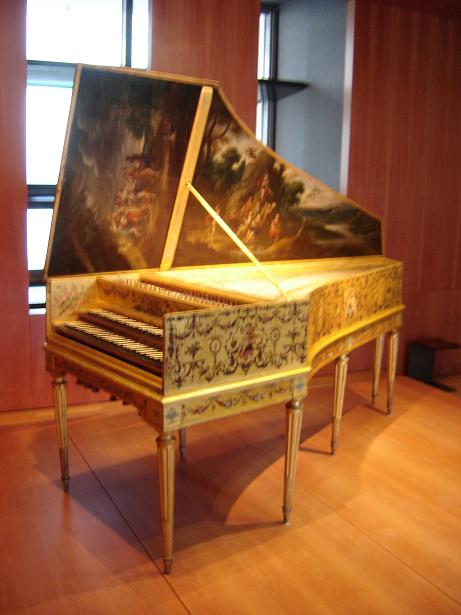
Harpsichord by Andréas II Ruckers, 1646, Antwerp.

== See also ==
- Musical Instrument Museum, Brussels
- Conservatoire de Paris
- Parc de la Villette
- Cité de la Musique
- Philharmonie de Paris
