= Team Haas =

Team Haas may refer to:

- Haas Lola (1984–1987): U.S.-based Formula One team owned by Carl Haas with FORCE-designed Lola-built cars sponsored by Beatrice Foods, who raced in 1985 and 1986; aka "Beatrice Haas", "Beatrice Lola", "Beatrice", "Lola"
- Haas F1 Team (since 2014): U.S.-registered Formula One team owned by Gene Haas, sponsored by Haas Automation, who have raced since 2016
- Newman/Haas Racing (1983–2011): CART, IndyCar, and Champ Car team owned by Carl Haas and Paul Newman; was known as Newman/Haas Racing from 1983–2007
  - Newman/Haas/Lanigan Racing (2007–2011): Named after Mike Lanigan became a partner into Newman/Haas Racing
- Haas-Carter Motorsports (2007–2008): NASCAR team owned by Travis Carter and Carl Haas, raced as Haas-Carter Motorsports in 2007
  - Richardson-Haas Motorsports (2008); Team name for the 2008 season, of Haas-Carter Motorsports
- Haas CNC Racing (2002–2008): NASCAR team owned by Gene Haas.
  - Stewart–Haas Racing (2002–2024): NASCAR team partnered with Tony Stewart.
    - Haas Factory Team (Since 2025): NASCAR team partnered with Joe Custer.

== See also ==
- Haas (disambiguation)
