= STO-nG basis sets =

Basis sets used in quantum chemistry

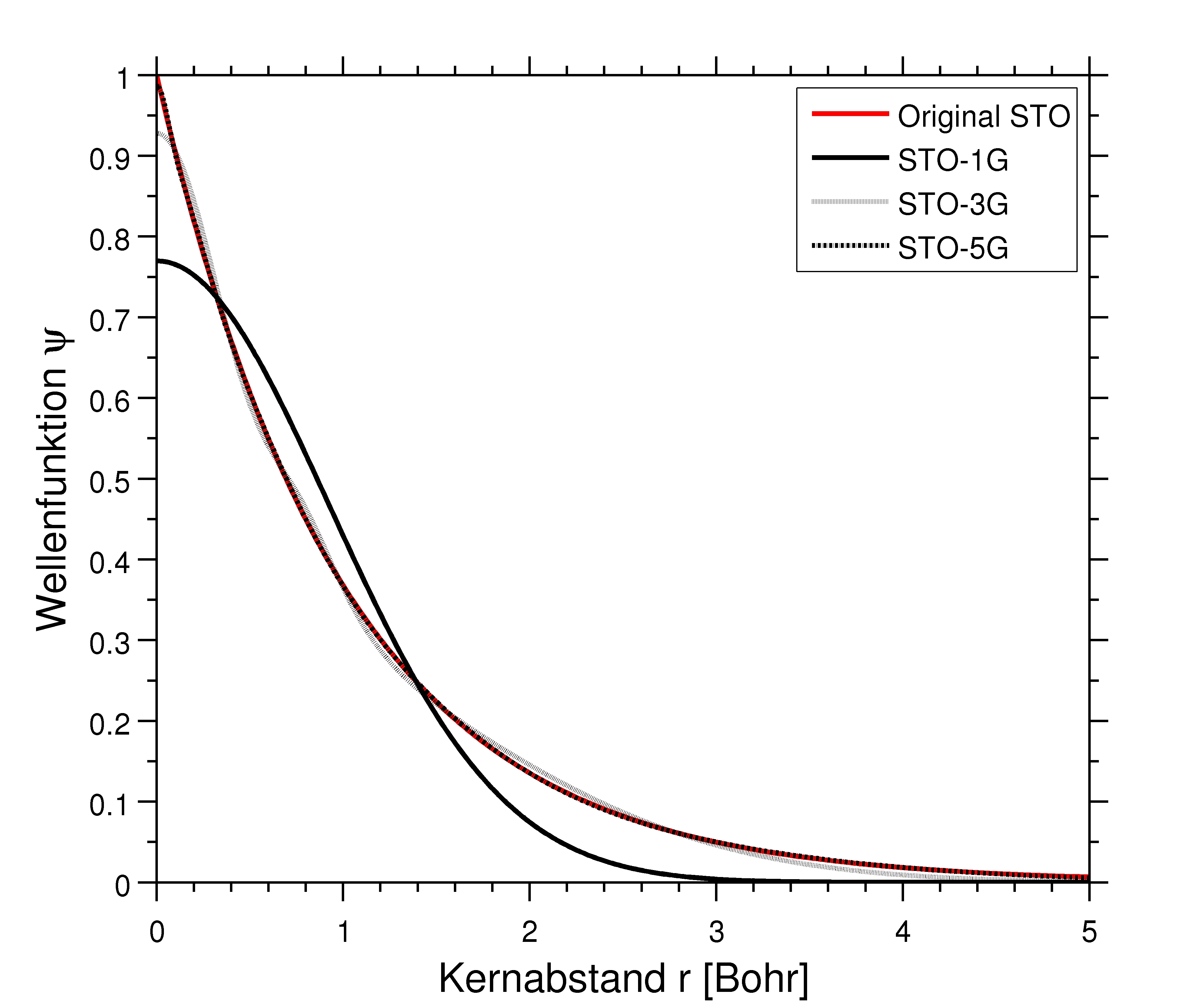
Comparison of STO-nG orbitals with the true Slatter orbital

STO-nG basis sets are minimal basis sets used in computational chemistry, more specifically in ab initio quantum chemistry methods, to calculate the molecular orbitals of chemical systems within Hartree–Fock theory or density functional theory. The basis functions are linear combinations of $n$ primitive Gaussian-type orbitals (GTOs) that are fitted to single Slater-type orbital (STO). They were first proposed by John Pople, and $n$ originally took the values form 2 to 6. A minimal basis set is where only sufficient orbitals are used to contain all the electrons in the neutral atom. Thus, for the hydrogen atom, only a single 1s orbital is needed, while for a carbon atom, 1s, 2s and three 2p orbitals are needed.

== General definition ==
STO-$n$G basis sets consist of one STO for each orbital in the neutral atom (with suitable parameter $\zeta$) for each atom in the system to be described (e.g. molecule). The STOs assigned to a particular atom are centered around its nucleus. Therefore, the number of basis functions for each atom depends on its type. The STO-$n$G basis sets are available for all atoms from hydrogen up to xenon.

element	number of STOs	STOs
H, He	1	1s
Li, Be	2	1s, 2s
B, C, N, O, F, Ne	5	1s, 2s, 2p
Na, Mg	6	1s, 2s, 2p, 3s
Al, Si, P, S, Cl, Ar	9	1s, 2s, 2p, 3s, 3p
K, Ca	10	1s, 2s, 2p, 3s, 3p, 4s
Sc-Zn	15	1s, 2s, 2p, 3s, 3p, 4s, 3d
Ga-Kr	18	1s, 2s, 2p, 3s, 3p, 4s, 3d, 4p
Rb, Sr	19	1s, 2s, 2p, 3s, 3p, 4s, 3d, 4p, 5s
Y-Cd	24	1s, 2s, 2p, 3s, 3p, 4s, 3d, 4p, 5s, 4d
In-Xe	27	1s, 2s, 2p, 3s, 3p, 4s, 3d, 4p, 5s, 4d, 5p

Each STO (both core and valence orbitals) $\psi_{ml}$, where $m$ is the principal quantum number, and $l$ is the angular momentum quantum number, is approximated by a linear combination of $n$ primitive GTOs $\phi_{l\alpha_{mj}}$ with exponents $\alpha_{mj}$:
$$\psi_{ml}^{\text{STO-}n\text{G}} = \sum_{j=1}^n c_{mlj} \phi_{l\alpha_j}.$$

The expansion coefficients $c_{mlj}$ and exponents $\alpha_{mj}$ are fitted with the least squares method (this differs from the more common procedure, where they are chosen to give the lowest energy) to all STOs within the same shell $m$ simultaneously. Note that all $\psi_{ml}^{\text{STO-}n\text{G}}$ within the same shell $m$ (e.g. 2s and 2p) share the same exponents, i.e. they do not depend on the angular momentum, which is a special feature of this basis set and allows more efficient computation.

The fit between the GTOs and the STOs is often reasonable, except near to the nucleus: STOs have a cusp at the nucleus, while GTOs are flat in that region. Extensive tables of parameters have been calculated for STO-1G through STO-6G for s orbitals through g orbitals and can be downloaded from the Basis Set Exchange.

== STO-2G basis set ==
The STO-2G basis set is a linear combination of 2 primitive Gaussian functions. The original coefficients and exponents for first-row and second-row atoms are given as follows (for $\zeta=1$):

STO-2G	α_{1}	c_{1}	α_{2}	c_{2}
1s	0.151623	0.678914	0.851819	0.430129
2s	0.0974545	0.963782	0.384244	0.0494718
2p	0.0974545	0.61282	0.384244	0.511541

For general values of $\zeta$, one can use the scaling law $\psi_{ml}^\zeta(\mathbf r) = \zeta^{3/2}\psi_{ml}^1(\zeta\mathbf r)$ to approximate general STOs with $\zeta \neq 1$.

== STO-3G basis set ==
The STO-3G basis set is the most commonly used among the STO-$n$G basis sets and is a linear combination of 3 primitive Gaussian functions. The coefficients and exponents for first-row and second-row atoms are given as follows (for $\zeta=1$):

STO-3G	α_{1}	c_{1}	α_{2}	c_{2}	α_{3}	c_{3}
1s	2.22766	0.154329	0.405771	0.535328	0.109818	0.444635
2s	0.994203	−0.0999672	0.231031	0.399515	0.0751386	0.700115
2p	0.994203	0.155916	0.231031	0.607684	0.0751386	0.391957

== Accuracy ==
The exact energy of the 1s electron of H atom is −0.5 hartree, given by a single Slater-type orbital with exponent 1.0. The following table illustrates the increase in accuracy as the number of primitive Gaussian functions increases from 3 to 6 in the basis set:

Basis set	Energy [hartree]
STO-3G	−0.49491
STO-4G	−0.49848
STO-5G	−0.49951
STO-6G	−0.49983

== Use of STO-nG basis sets ==
The most widely used basis set of this group is STO-3G, which is used for large systems and for preliminary geometry determinations. However, they are not suited for accurate ab-initio calculations due to their lack of flexibility in radial direction. For such tasks, larger basis sets are needed, such as the Pople basis sets.

== See also ==
- List of quantum chemistry and solid state physics software
