= Langenes Church =

- Langenes kirke
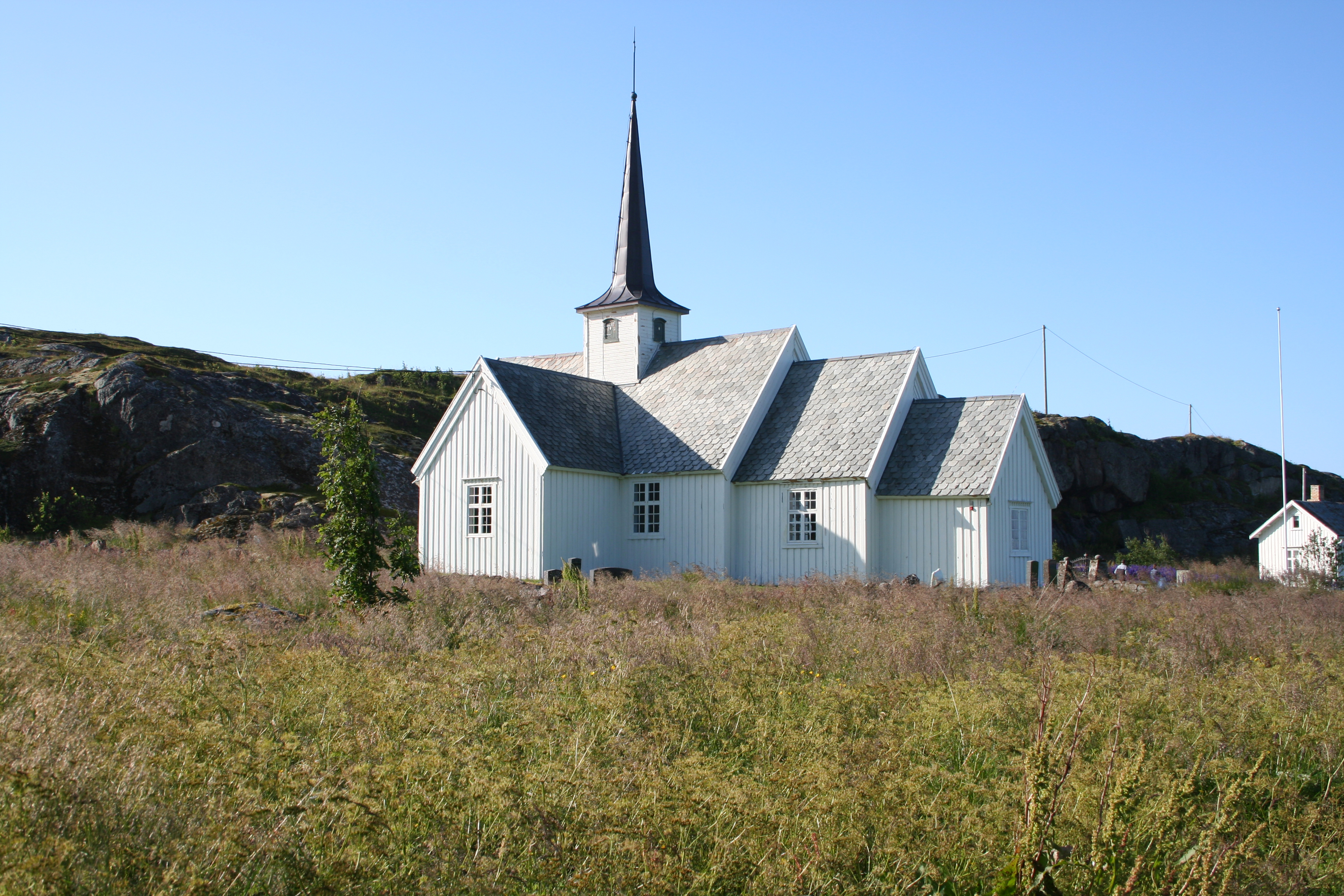
- View of the church
- Langenes Church
- 69.0188879°N 15.1558502°E
- Location: Øksnes Municipality, Nordland
- Country: Norway
- Denomination: Church of Norway
- Churchmanship: Evangelical Lutheran

History
- Status: Parish church
- Founded: 16th century
- Consecrated: 1795

Architecture
- Functional status: Active
- Architectural type: Cruciform
- Completed: 1795 (231 years ago)

Specifications
- Capacity: 165
- Materials: Wood

Administration
- Diocese: Sør-Hålogaland
- Deanery: Vesterålen prosti
- Parish: Øksnes
- Norwegian Cultural Heritage Site
- Type: Church
- Status: Listed
- ID: 84897

Langenes Church (Norwegian: Langenes kirke) is a parish church of the Church of Norway in Øksnes Municipality in Nordland county, Norway. It is located in the village of Stø, on the northern tip of the island of Langøya. It is one of the churches for the Øksnes parish which is part of the Vesterålen prosti (deanery) in the Diocese of Sør-Hålogaland. The white, wooden church was built in a cruciform style in 1795. The church seats about 165 people.

== History ==
The earliest existing historical records of the church date back to 1589, but the church was not new at that time. In the 1770s, the church was described as a log building in a cruciform design. There was a choir in the east with a sacristy attached to it. In 1794–1795, the church underwent a massive renovation. The deconstructed a lot of the building and then rebuilt the church, reusing as much of the old materials as possible. The church was renovated in 1882 and again in 1929. Based on the building's history, it is not unlikely that parts of the present church consist of materials from the late Middle Ages.

== Media gallery ==
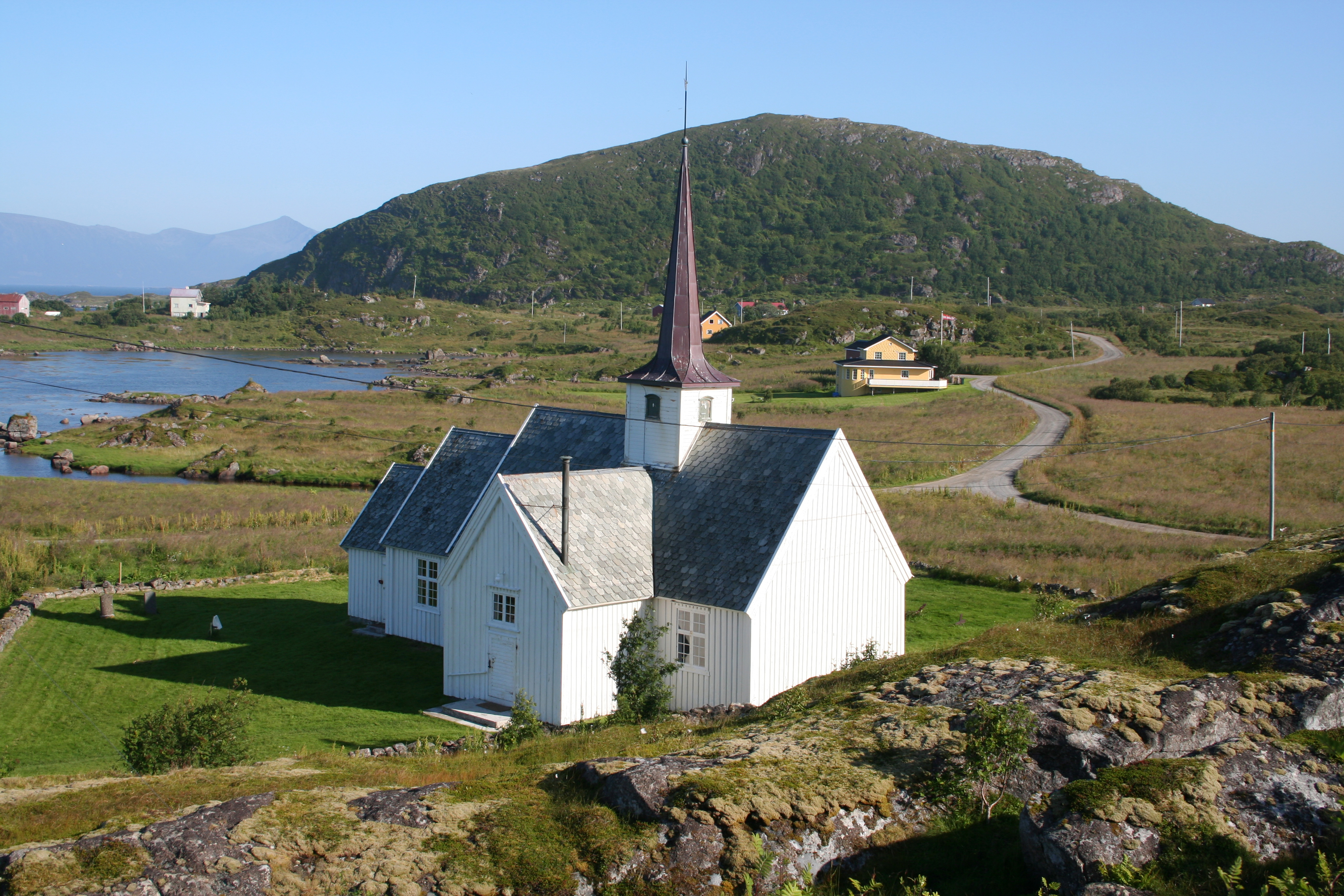

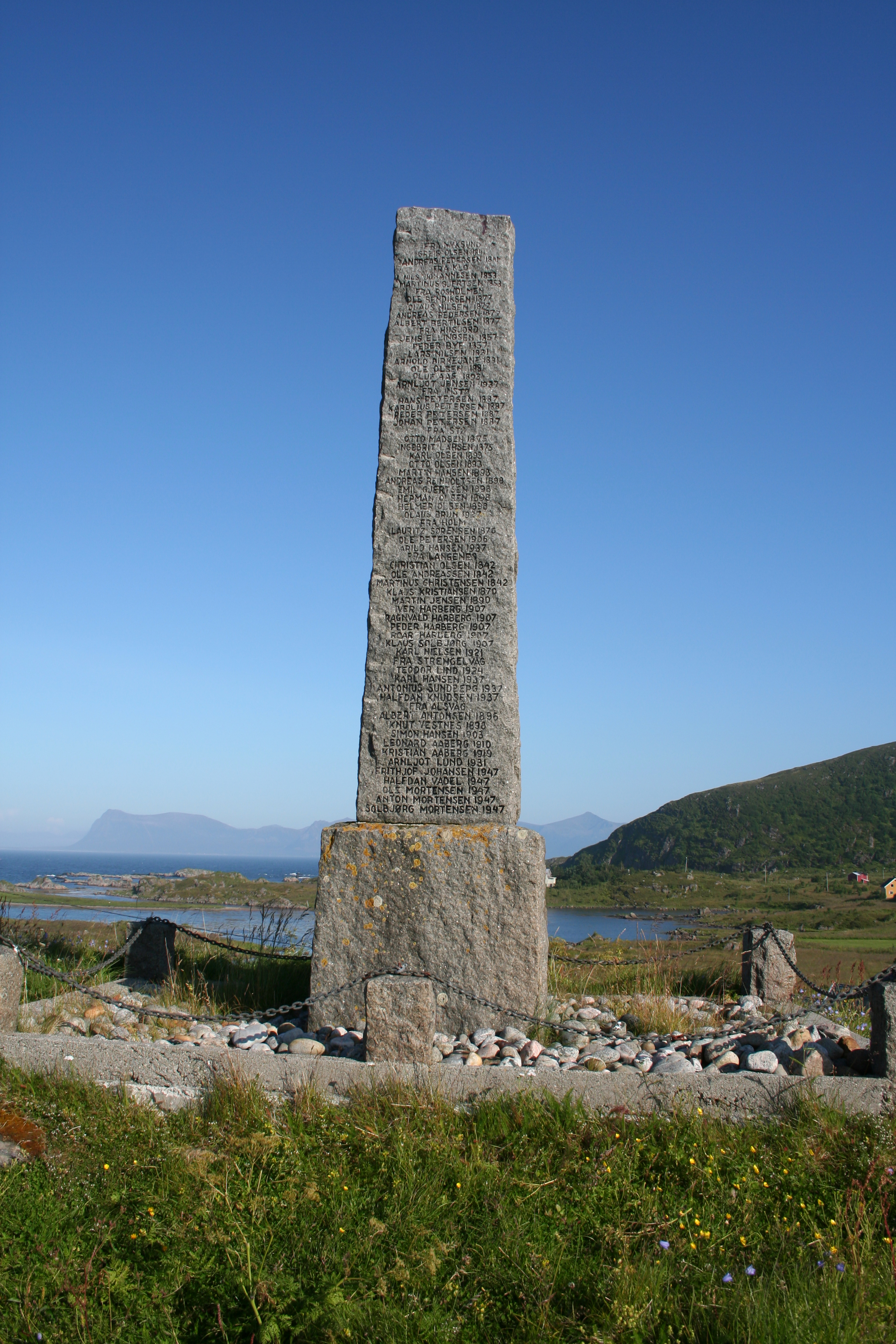

== See also ==
- List of churches in Sør-Hålogaland
