= STOS =

STOS may refer to:

- STOS BASIC, a programming language for the Atari ST computer
- stos, an opcode mnemonic in X86 assembly language
- Secure Trusted Operating System Consortium
- Štós, a village in Slovakia

== See also ==
- ST:TOS, an abbreviation for Star Trek: The Original Series (ST:OS)
- STO (disambiguation) for the singular of STOs
