= Jingwan-dong =

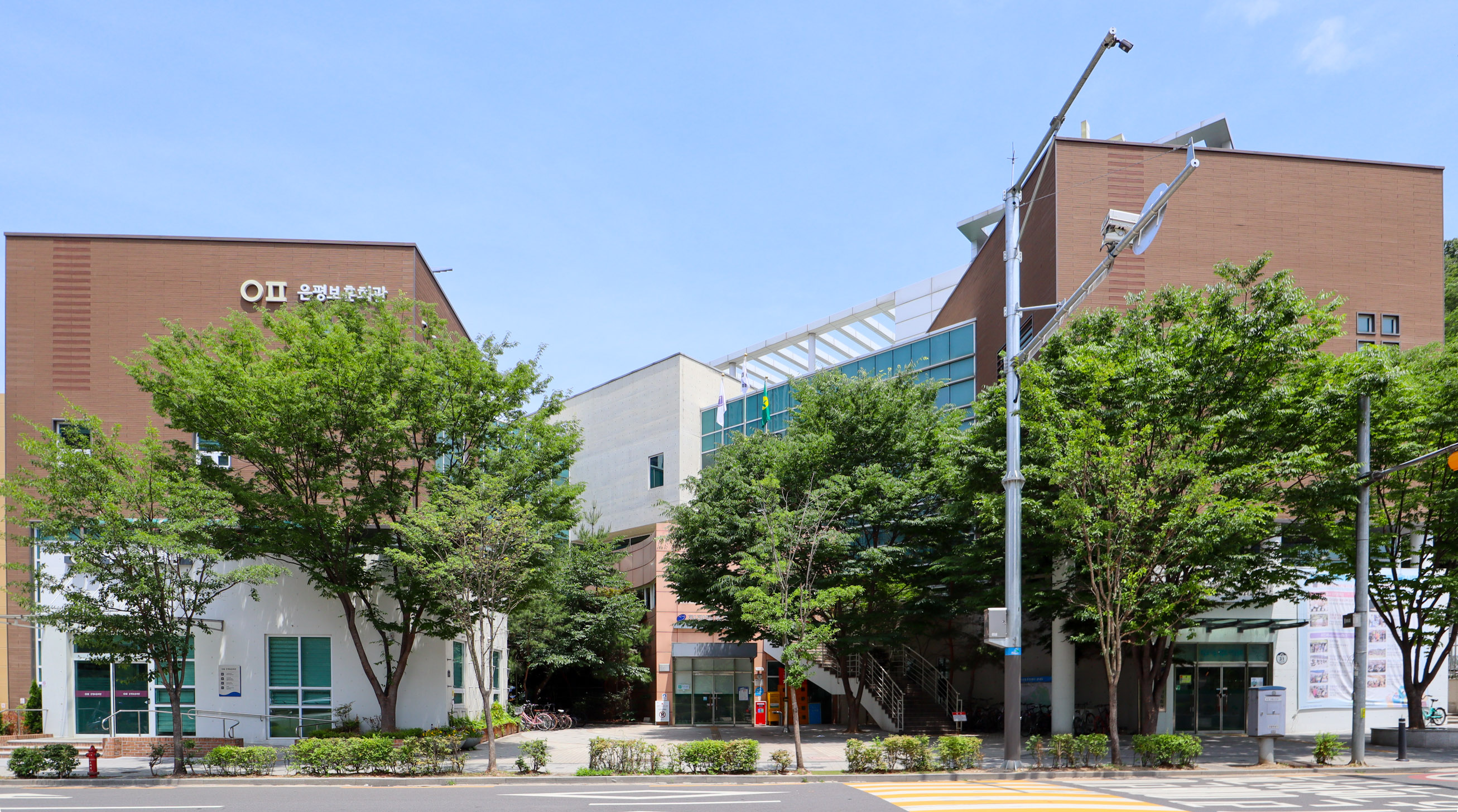
- Panoramic view of the Eunpyeong Hanok Village in Jingwan-dong Jingwan-dong Community Service Center
- Interactive map of Jingwan-dong
- Coordinates: 37°38′21″N 126°56′09″E
- Country: South Korea
- Region: Seoul Capital Area

Korean name
- Hangul: 진관동
- Hanja: 津寬洞
- RR: Jingwan-dong
- MR: Chin'gwan-dong

Jingwan-dong (Korean: 진관동) is a dong (neighbourhood) of Eunpyeong District, Seoul, South Korea.

== Etymology ==
The name Jingwan-dong originated from Jingwansa Temple. It was divided into Jingwannae-dong and Jingwanoe-dong in Beopjeong-dong, but in 2007, it was merged into Jingwan-dong.

Gupabal-dong originated from the fact that it was the place where there was a breakthrough to Byeokjegwan. It existed as an independent Beopjeong-dong, but in 2007, it was integrated into Jingwan-dong along with Jingwanoe-dong and Jingwannae-dong. As a scenic spot, there is Gupabal Falls.

Other names such as Mahgojeong, Umulgol, Pokpodong, Gijachon, Jaegakmal, and Sanglim remain as the name of Eunpyeong New Town Complex. Mahgojeong is the name given to a village where Chinese envoys stayed at Gupabal and waited for them to speak when entering Hanyang. Falls-dong originated from the existence of Hyangrim Falls in the valley. Gija Village was the name of a residential complex built exclusively for Gija from 1969 to 1974, and it has all been demolished now. Jagakmal was named because Cheoljong enshrined the tomb of Euneongun in Imalsan Mountain and built a shrine. Sangrim was named because there were hundreds of years-old juniper trees in the village.

== Education ==
Kindergartens located in Jingwan-dong:

- Seoul Bukhansan Kindergarten
- Seoul Sanullim Kindergarten
- Seoul Jingwan Kindergarten
- Forest Kindergarten
- Seoul Eunvit Kindergarten
- Seoul Sindo Elementary School Attached Kindergarten
- Daurim Myeongmun Kindergarten

Elementary Schools located in Jingwan-dong:

- Seoul Sindo Elementary School
- Seoul Jingwan Elementary School
- Seoul Eunjin Elementary School
- Seoul Eunvit Elementary School
- Seoul Bukhansan Elementary School

Middle Schools located in Jingwan-dong:

- Jingwan Middle School
- Shindo Middle School

High Schools located in Jingwan-dong:

- Hana Academy Seoul
- Jingwan High School
- Sindo High School
- Eunpyeong Meditech High School

== See also ==
- Administrative divisions of South Korea
