= HAA =

HAA may refer to:

== Haa as a word ==
- Haa Municipality, an old spelling of Hå Municipality in Norway
- Haa District, Bhutan
  - Haa, Bhutan, the seat of the district
- Hāʼ, Arabic letter ه
- Hän language

== HAA as a code or acronym ==
- Haloacetic acid
- Hasvik Airport in Finnmark, Norway
- Healthy Americans Act, a United States Senate bill
- Heavy anti-aircraft
- High Achievement Academy, in Beachwood, Ohio, United States
- High-altitude airship
- Honolulu Academy of Arts
- Hopper wagons of the British Rail Merry-go-round train
- NRC Herzberg Astronomy and Astrophysics Research Centre

== See also ==
- Haas (disambiguation)
- Ha (disambiguation)
