= Had =

Had or HAD may refer to:

- had, past tense of the English verb have
  - as an auxiliary verb
  - as a transitive main verb of possession
  - in passive voice constructions
- Hadit, a Thelemic deity
- Hole accumulation diode, in electronics

== See also ==
- Have (disambiguation)
- Hade (disambiguation)
- James while John had had had had had had had had had had had a better effect on the teacher, a well-formed but ambiguous sentence
