= Hass =

Hass may refer to:

- Hass (Ottoman)
- Hass (surname)
- Hass (town), a town in Syria
- Hass avocado, a type of avocado named after its cultivator, Rudolph Hass
- Hass Petroleum, an investment company
- Humanities, arts, and social sciences
- Home Assistant, the home automation software
- Humanities and Social Sciences, Australian core subject. Commonly abbreviated to ‘HASS’ and referred to as ‘social studies’ in other countries.

== See also ==
- Haas (disambiguation)
- Has (disambiguation)
