= Arbitrary unit =

Relative unit of measurement

In the vertical axis of this graph, arbitrary unit is used to express approximate trend in the current–voltage characteristic of a generic field-effect transistor. It allows to downplay the current's dependence on an individual device (the current depends on its size and other factors). Contrary, the voltage scale relies on electronic properties of the semiconductor, hence volts are given.

In science and technology, an arbitrary unit (abbreviated arb. unit, see below) or procedure defined unit (p.d.u.) is a relative unit of measurement to show the ratio of amount of substance, intensity, or other quantities, to a predetermined reference measurement. The reference measurement is typically defined by the local laboratories or dependent on individual measurement apparatus. It is therefore impossible to compare "1 arb. unit" by one measurer and "1000 arb. unit" by another measurer without detailed prior knowledge on how the respective "arbitrary units" were defined; thus, the unit is sometimes called an unknown unit. The unit only serves to compare multiple measurements performed in similar environment, since the ratio between the measurement and the reference is a consistent and dimensionless quantity independent of what actual units are used. Units of such kind are commonly used in fields such as physiology to indicate substance concentration, and spectroscopy to express spectral intensity.

When the reference measurement is precisely defined and internationally agreed upon, arbitrary units can also be a unit capable of public comparison. One example of a publicly defined arbitrary unit is the WHO International Unit.

== Abbreviations and nomenclature ==
Abbreviations for "arbitrary unit" include: arb. unit, arb. u., AU, and a.u. Among these, "AU" and "a.u." are common abbreviations for astronomical units and atomic units. For this reason, Physical Review journals, the Japanese Journal of Applied Physics, and an increasing number of other academic journals, recommend against using "a.u." (Jpn. J. Appl. Phys recommends "arb. unit" instead).

In UCUM, arbitrary unit is represented as "[arb'U]".

While arbitrary unit is not a formally recognized unit, IUPAC and IFCC recognize the need to deal with "unknown units", and decided in 2008 to use the term "procedure defined unit" in their database. The decision forbids using factors or denominators in conjunction with p.d.u. (such as "p.d.u./L").
