= Johann Wilhelm Haas =

German trumpet maker and engraver

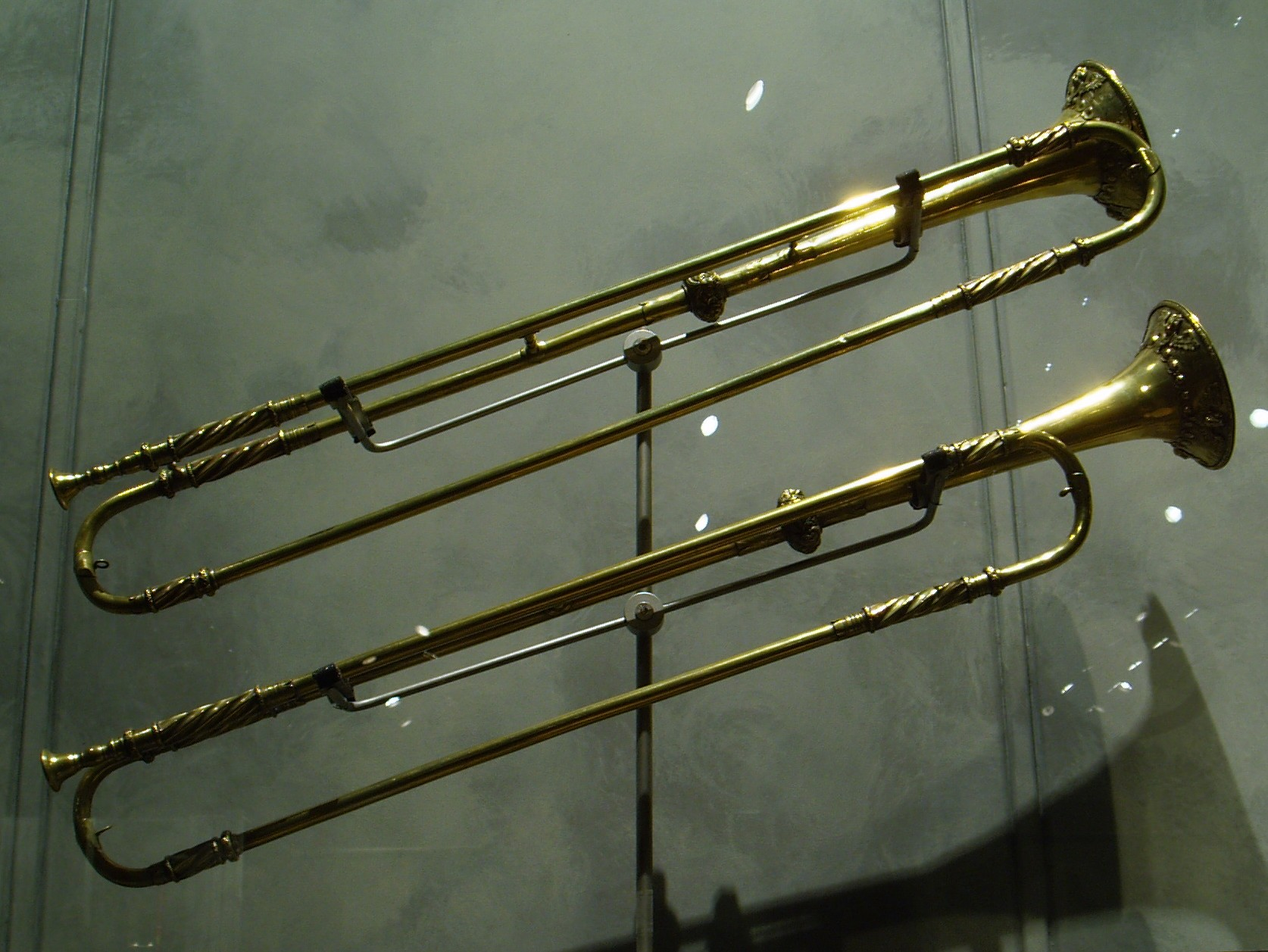
Baroque trumpets by Johann Wilhelm Haas

Johann Wilhelm Haas (1649 – 1723), was a German trumpet maker and engraver.

== Biography ==
He was born in Nuremberg and was a member of the Haas family of brass instrument makers. His baroque trumpets were used in courts across Germany and he carried on correspondence with court purveyors about repairs and replacements. He engraved his signature on the trumpets he repaired and replaced.

He died in Nuremberg.
