= Hav (surname) =

Hav is a Danish surname.

Notable people with the surname Hav include:

- Benjamin Hav (born 1985), Danish rapper
- Orla Hav (born 1952), Danish politician
