= Hana Academy Seoul =

Coordinates: 37°38′30″N 126°56′13″E

Hana Academy Seoul 하나고등학교

Location
- 129 Jingwan-dong, Eunpyeong-gu; Seoul; South Korea

Information
- Type: Private, boarding
- Established: 2010
- Principal: Chogyeseong
- Deputy Principal: 이영상 조계성
- Gender: Coeducational
- Website: eng.hana.hs.kr

Hana Academy Seoul (Korean: 하나고등학교; also Hana High School) is a private high school located in Seoul, South Korea. HAS was established in 2010 by Hana Financial Group, one of the largest financial groups in South Korea. Generally, the purpose of the most high schools in South Korea is to prepare students for the CSAT, but HAS has a unique curriculum. For this reason HAS is often called "Korea's Eton College" All HAS students must live in the school dormitory.

== History ==
In 2008 the school was opened as one of Hana Financial Group's social contribution activities.

It has been converted to an autonomous private high school and is expected to be a school that many students hope for.
