= Have =

Give, giving, to give may refer to:

- ￼
- Gift(or giving)—sensu latissimo

== Language ==
- have, an auxiliary verb in English
  - its bare use in passive voice constructions
- to have, a transitive verb of possession in English
- Have, a variant of Latin salutation Ave

== People ==
- Peter Have (born 1963), Danish politician
- Stefan Haves (born 1958), American clown and theatre director

== Other uses ==
- Having (album), 2006, by Trespassers William
- Having (inlet), on Rügen island in Germany
- Having (SQL), a programming clause
- HAVE, a United States military codeword for Air Force Systems Command projects

== See also ==
- Has (disambiguation)
- Had (disambiguation)
- Haver, a surname
- Havers, another surname
