= Stø =

Village in Øksnes Municipality, Norway

- Village
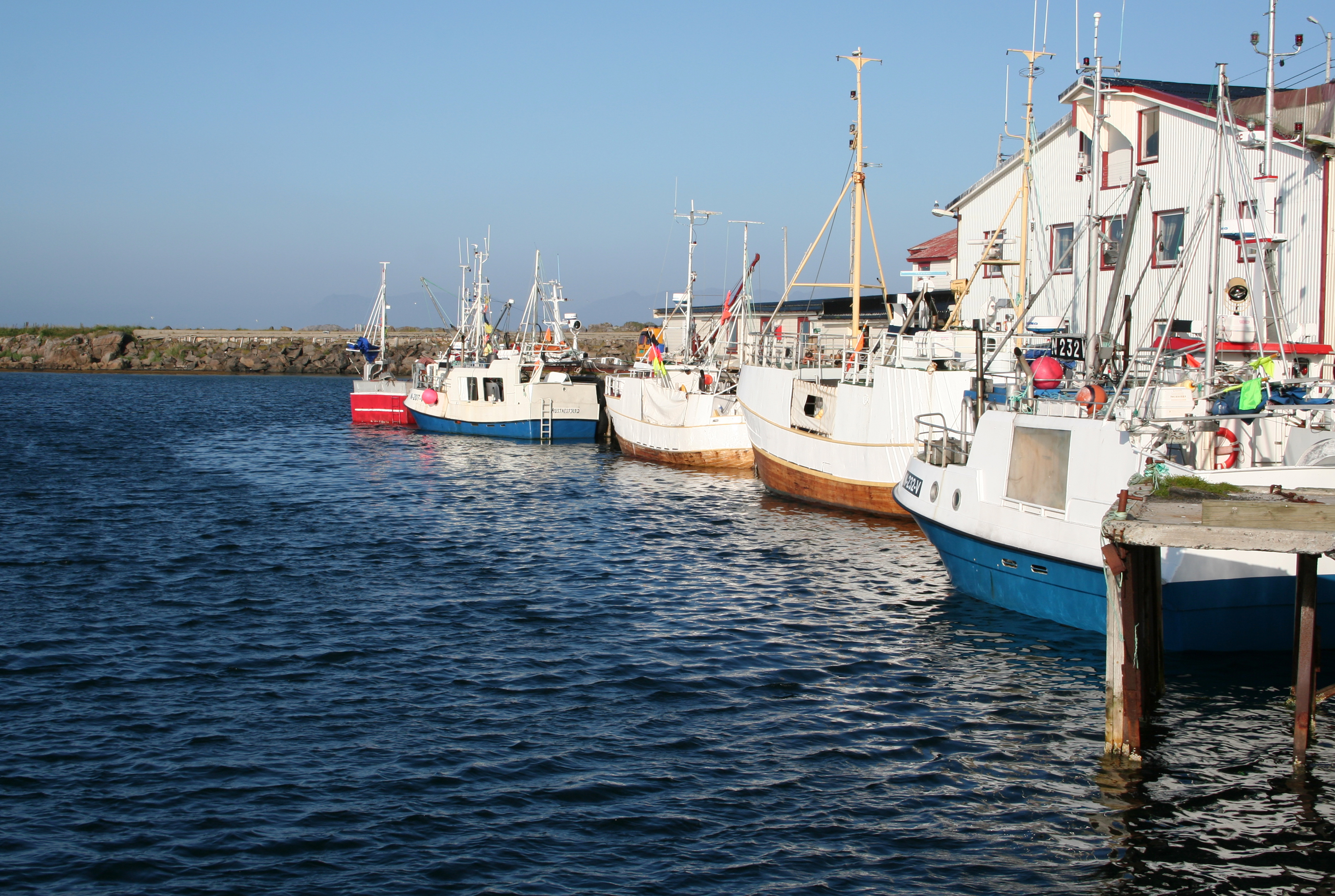
- View of the village harbour
- Interactive map of Stø
- Location within Nordland Location within Norway
- Coordinates: 69.0189°N 15.1235°E
- Country: Norway
- Region: Northern Norway
- County: Nordland
- District: Vesterålen
- Municipality: Øksnes Municipality
- Elevation: 4 m (13 ft)
- Time zone: UTC+01:00 (CET)
  - Summer (DST): UTC+02:00 (CEST)
- Post Code: 8438 Stø

Stø is a fishing village in Øksnes Municipality in Nordland county, Norway. It is located on the northern tip of the island of Langøya, along the Gavlfjorden in the Vesterålen archipelago. In 2001, there were about 175 residents. This village was the administrative centre of the old Langenes Municipality which existed from 1919 until 1964.

== Tourism ==
There are two places serving food in Stø. Some of the specialities at these restaurants are whale meat, cod tongues, boknafisk, Arctic char, and soup with salmon and catfish. Rental cabins and camping areas are available for tourists.

Langenes Church

Langenes Church was built in the 1700s during Norway's Baroque period. It seats 160 people and is one of the oldest wooden churches in Northern Norway.

Bird, seal and whale tours

Daily sea tours are available from May to September.

Anda Island

Anden Island is a nature reserve with a large population of birds and seals approximately 5 kilometres (3.1 mi) north of the island of Langøya. Birds that can be spotted on the island include the white-tailed eagle (Haliaeetus albicilla), puffin (Fratercula arctica), great cormorant (Phalacrocorax carbo), shag (Phalacrocorax aristotelis), black-legged kittiwake (Rissa tridactyla), common guillemot (Uria aalge) and razorbill (Alca torda).
