= H2A =

H2A, H-2A or H-IIA can refer to:

- Histone H2A, a component of DNA higher structure in eukaryotic cells
- H-IIA, a family of Japanese rockets.
- H-2A visa, a temporary, nonimmigrant visa allowing foreign nationals entry into the U.S. for seasonal agricultural work.
