= Has, Novi Travnik =

Has
- Village
- Location within Bosnia and Herzegovina
- Coordinates: 44.0395715°N 17.6838937°E
- Country: Bosnia and Herzegovina
- Entity: Federation of Bosnia and Herzegovina
- Canton: Central Bosnia
- Municipality: Novi Travnik

Area
  - Total: 4.63 sq mi (11.99 km^{2})

Population (2013)
  - Total: 333
  - Density: 71.9/sq mi (27.8/km^{2})
- Time zone: UTC+1 (CET)
  - Summer (DST): UTC+2 (CEST)

Has is a village in the municipality of Novi Travnik, Bosnia and Herzegovina.

== Demographics ==
According to the 2013 census, its population was 333.

Ethnicity in 2013
Ethnicity	Number	Percentage
Bosniaks	323	97.0%
Croats	8	2.4%
other/undeclared	2	0.3%
Total	333	100%
