= Hade =

Hade and Hading may refer to:

- In geology, the angle of inclination from the vertical of a vein (geology), fault, or lode: it can be a noun or a verb
- Jane Hading, a French actress
- Hading is a form of Hadingus, a legendary early Danish king
- Hade is a village in Hedesunda municipality in Sweden

== See also ==
- Hades
