= Ha (Javanese) =

ha
- ꦲ
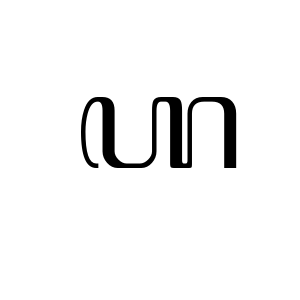
- Aksara nglegena

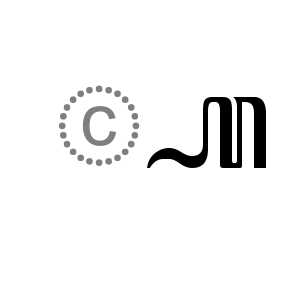
- Aksara pasangan

Usage
- Writing system: Javanese script
- Latin orthography: ha, a
- Sound values: [h], [ɔ], [a]
- In Unicode: A9B2

ꦲ (ha), is a syllable in the Javanese script which represents the sound /hɔ/ or /ha/. The letter can also represent a null consonant, in which it would be pronounced as /ɔ/ or /a/. It is commonly transliterated to Latin as "ha" or "a" and sometimes as "ho" and "o".

== Pasangan ==
The letter's pasangan (◌꧀ꦲ) is one of six which are located on the right hand side of previous syllable, making it possible to stack two pasangans without the use of pangkon.

== Extended form ==
ꦲ doesn't have a murda form.

== Final consonant ==
ꦲ has a syllable-final form called wignyan (ꦃ) which replaces ha-pangkon combination. For example: "gajah" (elephant) is written as ꦒꦗꦃ, not ꦒꦗꦲ꧀

== Glyphs ==
Nglegena forms				Pasangan forms			
ꦲ ha	ꦲꦃ hah	ꦲꦁ hang	ꦲꦂ har	◌꧀ꦲ -ha	◌꧀ꦲꦃ -hah	◌꧀ꦲꦁ -hang	◌꧀ꦲꦂ -har
ꦲꦺ he	ꦲꦺꦃ heh	ꦲꦺꦁ heng	ꦲꦺꦂ her	◌꧀ꦲꦺ -he	◌꧀ꦲꦺꦃ -heh	◌꧀ꦲꦺꦁ -heng	◌꧀ꦲꦺꦂ -her
ꦲꦼ hê	ꦲꦼꦃ hêh	ꦲꦼꦁ hêng	ꦲꦼꦂ hêr	◌꧀ꦲꦼ -hê	◌꧀ꦲꦼꦃ -hêh	◌꧀ꦲꦼꦁ -hêng	◌꧀ꦲꦼꦂ -hêr
ꦲꦶ hi	ꦲꦶꦃ hih	ꦲꦶꦁ hing	ꦲꦶꦂ hir	◌꧀ꦲꦶ -hi	◌꧀ꦲꦶꦃ -hih	◌꧀ꦲꦶꦁ -hing	◌꧀ꦲꦶꦂ -hir
ꦲꦺꦴ ho	ꦲꦺꦴꦃ hoh	ꦲꦺꦴꦁ hong	ꦲꦺꦴꦂ hor	◌꧀ꦲꦺꦴ -ho	◌꧀ꦲꦺꦴꦃ -hoh	◌꧀ꦲꦺꦴꦁ -hong	◌꧀ꦲꦺꦴꦂ -hor
ꦲꦸ hu	ꦲꦸꦃ huh	ꦲꦸꦁ hung	ꦲꦸꦂ hur	◌꧀ꦲꦸ -hu	◌꧀ꦲꦸꦃ -huh	◌꧀ꦲꦸꦁ -hung	◌꧀ꦲꦸꦂ -hur
ꦲꦿ hra	ꦲꦿꦃ hrah	ꦲꦿꦁ hrang	ꦲꦿꦂ hrar	◌꧀ꦲꦿ -hra	◌꧀ꦲꦿꦃ -hrah	◌꧀ꦲꦿꦁ -hrang	◌꧀ꦲꦿꦂ -hrar
ꦲꦿꦺ hre	ꦲꦿꦺꦃ hreh	ꦲꦿꦺꦁ hreng	ꦲꦿꦺꦂ hrer	◌꧀ꦲꦿꦺ -hre	◌꧀ꦲꦿꦺꦃ -hreh	◌꧀ꦲꦿꦺꦁ -hreng	◌꧀ꦲꦿꦺꦂ -hrer
ꦲꦽ hrê	ꦲꦽꦃ hrêh	ꦲꦽꦁ hrêng	ꦲꦽꦂ hrêr	◌꧀ꦲꦽ -hrê	◌꧀ꦲꦽꦃ -hrêh	◌꧀ꦲꦽꦁ -hrêng	◌꧀ꦲꦽꦂ -hrêr
ꦲꦿꦶ hri	ꦲꦿꦶꦃ hrih	ꦲꦿꦶꦁ hring	ꦲꦿꦶꦂ hrir	◌꧀ꦲꦿꦶ -hri	◌꧀ꦲꦿꦶꦃ -hrih	◌꧀ꦲꦿꦶꦁ -hring	◌꧀ꦲꦿꦶꦂ -hrir
ꦲꦿꦺꦴ hro	ꦲꦿꦺꦴꦃ hroh	ꦲꦿꦺꦴꦁ hrong	ꦲꦿꦺꦴꦂ hror	◌꧀ꦲꦿꦺꦴ -hro	◌꧀ꦲꦿꦺꦴꦃ -hroh	◌꧀ꦲꦿꦺꦴꦁ -hrong	◌꧀ꦲꦿꦺꦴꦂ -hror
ꦲꦿꦸ hru	ꦲꦿꦸꦃ hruh	ꦲꦿꦸꦁ hrung	ꦲꦿꦸꦂ hrur	◌꧀ꦲꦿꦸ -hru	◌꧀ꦲꦿꦸꦃ -hruh	◌꧀ꦲꦿꦸꦁ -hrung	◌꧀ꦲꦿꦸꦂ -hrur
ꦲꦾ hya	ꦲꦾꦃ hyah	ꦲꦾꦁ hyang	ꦲꦾꦂ hyar	◌꧀ꦲꦾ -hya	◌꧀ꦲꦾꦃ -hyah	◌꧀ꦲꦾꦁ -hyang	◌꧀ꦲꦾꦂ -hyar
ꦲꦾꦺ hye	ꦲꦾꦺꦃ hyeh	ꦲꦾꦺꦁ hyeng	ꦲꦾꦺꦂ hyer	◌꧀ꦲꦾꦺ -hye	◌꧀ꦲꦾꦺꦃ -hyeh	◌꧀ꦲꦾꦺꦁ -hyeng	◌꧀ꦲꦾꦺꦂ -hyer
ꦲꦾꦼ hyê	ꦲꦾꦼꦃ hyêh	ꦲꦾꦼꦁ hyêng	ꦲꦾꦼꦂ hyêr	◌꧀ꦲꦾꦼ -hyê	◌꧀ꦲꦾꦼꦃ -hyêh	◌꧀ꦲꦾꦼꦁ -hyêng	◌꧀ꦲꦾꦼꦂ -hyêr
ꦲꦾꦶ hyi	ꦲꦾꦶꦃ hyih	ꦲꦾꦶꦁ hying	ꦲꦾꦶꦂ hyir	◌꧀ꦲꦾꦶ -hyi	◌꧀ꦲꦾꦶꦃ -hyih	◌꧀ꦲꦾꦶꦁ -hying	◌꧀ꦲꦾꦶꦂ -hyir
ꦲꦾꦺꦴ hyo	ꦲꦾꦺꦴꦃ hyoh	ꦲꦾꦺꦴꦁ hyong	ꦲꦾꦺꦴꦂ hyor	◌꧀ꦲꦾꦺꦴ -hyo	◌꧀ꦲꦾꦺꦴꦃ -hyoh	◌꧀ꦲꦾꦺꦴꦁ -hyong	◌꧀ꦲꦾꦺꦴꦂ -hyor
ꦲꦾꦸ hyu	ꦲꦾꦸꦃ hyuh	ꦲꦾꦸꦁ hyung	ꦲꦾꦸꦂ hyur	◌꧀ꦲꦾꦸ -hyu	◌꧀ꦲꦾꦸꦃ -hyuh	◌꧀ꦲꦾꦸꦁ -hyung	◌꧀ꦲꦾꦸꦂ -hyur

== Orthography ==
There are several rules regarding the writing of ꦲ, whether pronounced as "ha" or "a".

1. ꦲ in front of a word is always transliterated as "a", except for foreign loan words. The same rule applies when sandhangan swara (vowel diacritics) is used.
  - Read as "a": ꦲꦏꦸ - aku (me), ꦲꦺꦴꦫ - ora (not), ꦲꦶꦭꦁ - ilang (lost)
  - Read as "ha": ꦲꦗꦶ - haji (hajj), ꦲꦺꦴꦠꦺꦭ꧀ - hotèl, ꦲꦶꦏ꧀ꦩꦠ꧀ - hikmat (wisdom)
  (Whether a word is considered a native Javanese or not will depend on the dictionary definition.)
2. ꦲ in the middle of a word is almost always transliterated as "ha".
  - ꦠꦲꦸ - tahu (tofu), not tau
  - ꦫꦲꦪꦸ - ra-hayu (blessed), not rah-ayu (from root word ꦲꦪꦸ ayu (beauty))
  With the exception
  - Certain words such as ꦩꦲꦺꦴꦱ꧀ - maos (reading) or ꦏꦺꦴꦱ꧀ - kaos (shirt)
  - Words that end with "a" and has suffix -a, such as ꦲꦤꦲ - ana-a (let there be)
  - Reduplicated word, where ꦲ in the beginning of the second word always transliterated as "a"
3. In root word that ends with /h/ sound (in this sense, using wignyan) and has suffix (-i, -an, etc.), ꦲ (as in "ha") is added before the suffix.
  - ꦥꦤꦼꦩ꧀ꦧꦃꦲꦤ꧀ - panembah-han (to address a royalty), from the root word ꦤꦼꦩ꧀ꦧꦃ - nembah (to bow, to respect)
4. Root words that end with a vowel sound and have suffix -ake, its suffix is written as ꦏ꧀ꦲꦏꦺ
  - ꦏꦠꦩ꧀ꦠꦺꦴꦏ꧀ꦲꦏꦺ - katamtokaké (have been chosen), not katamtokhaké, from the root word ꦠꦩ꧀ꦠꦸ - tamtu - (certain)
5. ꦲ are added in front of root words with prefix ng-, ny-, m-, and n-, although this is not mandatory.
  - ꦲꦔꦤ꧀ꦢꦶꦏ - ngandika (said), not hangandika nor angandika
6. Root words that start with ꦲ with added prefix pi- or pri-, the syllable ꦲ become ꦪ (ya)
  - ꦥꦶꦪꦒꦼꦩ꧀ - piyagem, from root word ꦲꦒꦼꦩ꧀ - agem.

== Unicode block ==
Javanese script was added to the Unicode Standard in October, 2009 with the release of version 5.2.

Javanese^{[1]}^{[2]} Official Unicode Consortium code chart (PDF)
	0	1	2	3	4	5	6	7	8	9	A	B	C	D	E	F
U+A98x	ꦀ	ꦁ	ꦂ	ꦃ	ꦄ	ꦅ	ꦆ	ꦇ	ꦈ	ꦉ	ꦊ	ꦋ	ꦌ	ꦍ	ꦎ	ꦏ
U+A99x	ꦐ	ꦑ	ꦒ	ꦓ	ꦔ	ꦕ	ꦖ	ꦗ	ꦘ	ꦙ	ꦚ	ꦛ	ꦜ	ꦝ	ꦞ	ꦟ
U+A9Ax	ꦠ	ꦡ	ꦢ	ꦣ	ꦤ	ꦥ	ꦦ	ꦧ	ꦨ	ꦩ	ꦪ	ꦫ	ꦬ	ꦭ	ꦮ	ꦯ
U+A9Bx	ꦰ	ꦱ	ꦲ	꦳	ꦴ	ꦵ	ꦶ	ꦷ	ꦸ	ꦹ	ꦺ	ꦻ	ꦼ	ꦽ	ꦾ	ꦿ
U+A9Cx	꧀	꧁	꧂	꧃	꧄	꧅	꧆	꧇	꧈	꧉	꧊	꧋	꧌	꧍		ꧏ
U+A9Dx	꧐	꧑	꧒	꧓	꧔	꧕	꧖	꧗	꧘	꧙					꧞	꧟
Notes 1.As of Unicode version 17.0 2.Grey areas indicate non-assigned code points
