= Haas (brass instrument makers) =

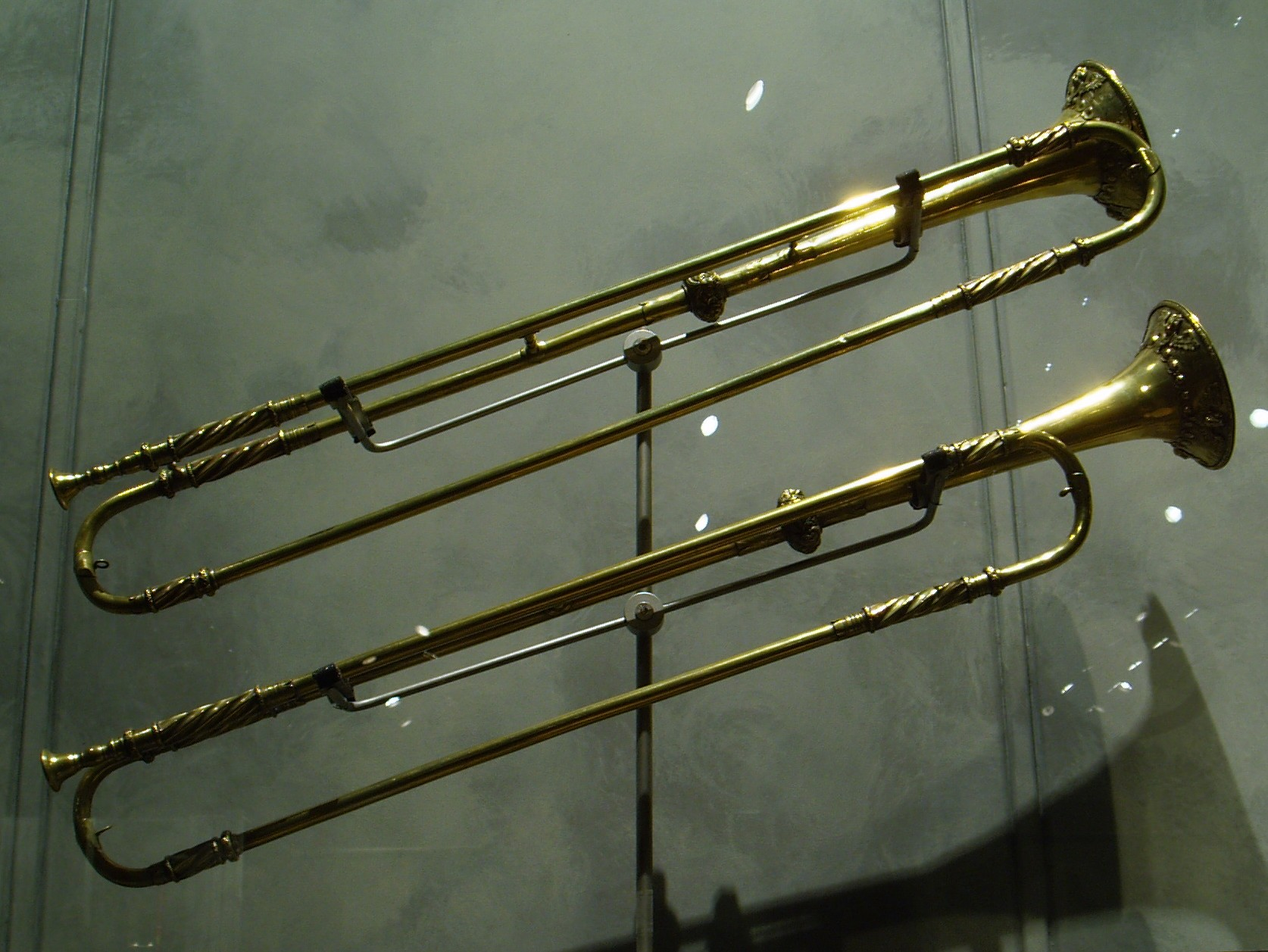
Baroque trumpets by Johann Wilhelm Haas

The Haas family was a German family of brass instrument makers. They had a factory in the city of Nuremberg. Johann Wilhelm Haas (baptized 6 Aug 1649, Nuremberg – buried 2 July 1723, Nuremberg) was the first of the family to make brass instruments. Johann was the son of two generations of guards of the city night watch who played trumpet calls as part of their duties. He most likely learned to make instruments from Hanns Hainlein (1598–1671). He achieved the title of master craftsman in 1676 and became the most well known of all the Nuremberg brass makers.

Both Johann Haas's son Wolf Wilhelm Haas (1681–1760) and grandson Ernst Johann Conrad Haas (1723–1792) followed him into the brass instrument making business. Wolf and Ernst Haas both signed their work with Johann Haas's name rather than using their own names. The Haas brass instruments were highly prized throughout Europe, and as a result there are many extant instruments found throughout the continent, including more than 60 trumpets, 7 horns, and 2 trombones. Some of the instruments were made by special commission and are more ornate with silver and gold as their material make-up. Museums which contain instruments made by the Haas family in their collections include the Metropolitan Museum of Art in New York, the Bavarian National Museum in Munich, the National Music Museum in South Dakota, the Trompetenmuseum in Säckingen, and the Kunstgewerbemuseum Berlin.
