= Safe Torque Off =

The Safe Torque Off (STO) is an electronic signal used in industrial motor controllers for safety reasons.

== Description ==
The STO function is the most common and basic drive-integrated safety function. It ensures that no torque-generating energy can continue to act upon a motor and prevents unintentional starting.
