= Slater-type orbital =

Function used in quantum chemistry

Slater-type orbitals (STOs) or Slater-type functions (STFs) are functions used as atomic orbitals in the linear combination of atomic orbitals molecular orbital method. They are named after the physicist John C. Slater, who introduced them in 1930.

They possess exponential decay at long range and Kato's cusp condition at short range (when combined as hydrogen-like atom functions, i.e. the analytical solutions of the stationary Schrödinger equation for one-electron atoms). Unlike the hydrogen-like ("hydrogenic") Schrödinger orbitals, STOs have no radial nodes (neither do Gaussian-type orbitals).

== Definition ==
STOs have the following radial part:
$$R(r) = N r^{n-1} e^{-\zeta r},$$
where n = 1, 2, ... is a natural number that plays the role of principal quantum number, N is a normalizing constant, r is the distance of the electron from the atomic nucleus, and $\zeta$ is a constant related to the effective charge of the nucleus, the nuclear charge being partly shielded by electrons. Historically, the effective nuclear charge was estimated by Slater's rules.

The normalization constant is computed from the integral
$$\int_0^\infty x^n e^{-\alpha x} \, \mathrm dx = \frac{n!}{\alpha^{n+1}}.$$
Hence
$$N^2 \int_0^\infty (r^{n-1} e^{-\zeta r})^2 r^2 \, \mathrm dr = 1
\quad \Longrightarrow \quad
N = (2\zeta)^n \sqrt{\frac{2\zeta}{(2n)!}}.$$

It is common to use the spherical harmonics $Y_l^m(\mathbf{r})$ depending on the polar coordinates of the position vector $\mathbf{r}$ as the angular part of the Slater orbital.

== STO-nG basis sets ==
All the spherical coordinates of the Slater-type orbital can be written as the function
$$S_{nlm}(r, \theta, \phi) = N\, r^{n-1} e^{-\zeta r} Y_l^m(\theta, \phi),$$
where the constant $N = (2\zeta)^n \sqrt{\frac{2\zeta}{(2n)!}}.$

The Gaussian-type function is
$$G_{nlm}(r, \theta, \phi) = N\, r^{n-1} e^{-\alpha r^2} Y_l^m(\theta, \phi),$$
where N is the same constant.

Due to the shape of the functions, Gaussian-type orbitals are easier to solve. While Slater orbitals are more accurate, they are not widely used in modern computational chemistry techniques. This is because the integrals used to evaluate them are difficult. In particular, multicenter integrals are difficult to be evaluated by Slater orbitals. However, taking the integral of a Gaussian is much easier.

For example, the Slater-type orbital for 1s is
$$\phi^{\text{STO}}_{1s}(r, \zeta) = S_{100}(r, \zeta) = \left(\frac{\zeta^3}{\pi}\right)^{1/2} e^{-\zeta r},$$
and the Gaussian-type orbital for 1s is
$$\phi^{\text{GTO}}_{1s}(r, \alpha) = \left(\frac{2\alpha}{\pi}\right)^{3/4} e^{-\alpha r^2}.$$

These two functions exhibit distinct behaviors around the nucleus, with the Slater-type having a cusp, and the Gaussian flattening out at the center. However, we can approximate the STO using a linear combination of Gaussian functions (or GTO above). Gaussians tend to underestimate the values close to the nucleus, which tends to have significant deviations when calculating larger molecules. Researchers have curve-fit Gaussian functions to Slater functions. For example,
$$\begin{align}
\phi^{\text{STO-3G}}_{1s}(r) &=
\sum_{i=1}^3 d_{1s\,i}\, \phi^{\text{GTO}}_{1s}(r, \alpha_{1s\,i}) \\
&= 0.4446\,\phi^{\text{GTO}}_{1s}(r, 0.1688)
+ 0.5353\,\phi^{\text{GTO}}_{1s}(r, 0.6239)
+ 0.1543\,\phi^{\text{GTO}}_{1s}(r, 3.425)
\end{align}$$

The black line represents the slater-type orbital (STO), while the purple line represents the gaussian function (GF). Gaussians are less accurate but easier to compute

This is called a STO-3G basis set. The function is made of a linear combination of Gaussians curve-fitted to resemble a Slater-type orbital. Although it leads to more integrals to evaluate, all of them are relatively much easier. Below is a table of the d_{1s1} coefficients and α_{1s1} coefficients for an STO-6G basis set curve-fitted for ζ = 1.24:

d_{1s1}	α_{1s1}
0.1303	0.1000
0.4165	0.2431
0.3706	0.6260
0.1685	1.8222
0.0494	6.5131
0.0092	35.5231

== Derivatives ==
The first radial derivative of the radial part of a Slater-type orbital is
$$\frac{\partial R(r)}{\partial r} = \left(\frac{(n - 1)}{r} - \zeta\right) R(r).$$
The radial Laplace operator is split in two differential operators:
$$\nabla^2 = \frac{1}{r^2} \frac{\partial}{\partial r} \left(r^2 \frac{\partial}{\partial r}\right).$$
The first differential operator of the Laplace operator yields
$$\left(r^2 \frac{\partial}{\partial r}\right) R(r) = \left[(n - 1) r - \zeta r^2 \right] R(r).$$
The total Laplace operator, after applying the second differential operator,
$$\nabla^2 R(r) = \left(\frac{1}{r^2} \frac{\partial}{\partial r}\right) \left[(n - 1) r - \zeta r^2 \right] R(r),$$
yields the result
$$\nabla^2 R(r) = \left(\frac{n (n - 1)}{r^2} - \frac{2 n \zeta}{r} + \zeta^2 \right) R(r).$$
Angular-dependent derivatives of the spherical harmonics don't depend on the radial function and have to be evaluated separately.

== Integrals ==
The fundamental mathematical properties are those associated with the kinetic energy, nuclear attraction and Coulomb repulsion integrals for placement of the orbital at the center of a single nucleus. Dropping the normalization factor N, the representation of the orbitals below is
$$\chi_{n \ell m}(\mathbf{r}) =
r^{n-1} e^{-\zeta r} Y_\ell^m(\mathbf{r}).$$

The Fourier transform is
$$\begin{align}
\chi_{n \ell m}(\mathbf{k}) &=
\int e^{i{\mathbf{k}} \cdot \mathbf{r}} \chi_{n \ell m}(\mathbf{r}) \,\mathrm{d}^3 r \\
&= 4\pi(n - \ell)! (2\zeta)^n (ik/\zeta)^\ell Y_\ell^m(\mathbf{k})
\sum_{s=0}^{\lfloor(n-\ell)/2\rfloor} \frac{\omega_s^{n\ell}}{(k^2 + \zeta^2)^{n+1-s}},
\end{align}$$
where the $\omega$ are defined by
$$\omega_s^{n \ell} \equiv \left(-\frac{1}{4\zeta^2}\right)^s \frac{(n - s)!}{s!(n - \ell - 2s)!}.$$

The overlap integral is
$$\int \chi^*_{n \ell m}(r) \chi_{n'\ell'm'}(r) \,\mathrm{d}^3 r =
\delta_{\ell \ell'} \delta_{mm'} \frac{(n + n')!}{(\zeta + \zeta')^{n+n'+1}},$$
of which the normalization integral is a special case. The superscript star denotes complex-conjugation.

The kinetic energy integral is
$$\begin{align}
&\int \chi^*_{n \ell m}(r) \left(-\frac{1}{2} \nabla^2\right) \chi_{n'\ell'm'}(r) \,\mathrm{d}^3 r \\
&\quad = \frac{1}{2} \delta_{\ell\ell'} \delta_{mm'}
\int_0^\infty e^{-(\zeta+\zeta')\,r} \left(
[\ell'(\ell' + 1) - n'(n' - 1)] r^{n+n'-2} + 2\zeta'n' r^{n+n'-1} - \zeta'^2\,r^{n+n'}
\right) \,\mathrm dr,
\end{align}$$
a sum over three overlap integrals already computed above.

The Coulomb repulsion integral can be evaluated using the Fourier representation (see above)
$$\chi^*_{n \ell m}({\mathbf{r}}) =
\int \frac{e^{i \mathbf{k} \cdot \mathbf{r}}}{(2\pi)^3} \chi^*_{n \ell m}(\mathbf{k}) \,\mathrm{d}^3 k,$$
which yields
$$\begin{align}
&\int \chi^*_{n \ell m}(\mathbf{r}) \frac{1}{|\mathbf{r} - \mathbf{r}'|} \chi_{n'\ell'm'}(\mathbf{r}') \,\mathrm{d}^3 r \\
&\quad = 4\pi \int \frac{1}{(2\pi)^3} \chi^*_{n \ell m}(\mathbf{k}) \frac{1}{k^2} \chi_{n'\ell'm'}(\mathbf{k}) \,\mathrm{d}^3 k \\
&\quad = 8\delta_{\ell\ell'} \delta_{mm'} (n - \ell) (n' - \ell)! \frac{(2\zeta)^n}{\zeta^\ell} \frac{(2\zeta')^{n'}}{\zeta'^\ell} \\
&\qquad \times \int_0^\infty k^{2\ell} \left[
\sum_{s=0}^{\lfloor(n-\ell)/2\rfloor} \frac{\omega_s^{n \ell}}{(k^2 + \zeta^2)^{n+1-s}}
\sum_{s'=0}^{\lfloor(n'-\ell)/2\rfloor} \frac{\omega_{s'}^{n'\ell'}}{(k^2 + \zeta'^2)^{n'+1-s'}}
\right] \,\mathrm dk.
\end{align}$$

These are either individually calculated with the law of residues or recursively as proposed by Cruz et al. (1978).

== STO software ==
Some quantum chemistry software uses sets of Slater-type functions (STF) analogous to Slater-type orbitals, but with variable exponents chosen to minimize the total molecular energy (rather than by Slater's rules as above). The fact that products of two STOs on distinct atoms are more difficult to express than those of Gaussian functions (which give a displaced Gaussian) has led many to expand them in terms of Gaussians.

Analytical ab initio software for polyatomic molecules has been developed, e.g., STOP: a Slater Type Orbital Package in 1996.

SMILES uses analytical expressions when available, and Gaussian expansions otherwise. It was first released in 2000.

Various grid integration schemes have been developed, sometimes after analytical work for quadrature (Scrocco), most famously in the ADF suite of DFT codes.

After the work of John Pople, Warren J. Hehre and Robert F. Stewart, a least-squares representation of the Slater atomic orbitals as a sum of Gaussian-type orbitals is used. In their 1969 paper, the fundamentals of this principle are discussed and then further improved and used in the GAUSSIAN DFT code.

== See also ==
- Basis sets used in computational chemistry
