= Hartree =

Unit of energy in the atomic units system

The hartree (symbol: E_{h}), also known as the Hartree energy, is the unit of energy in the atomic units system, named after the British physicist Douglas Hartree. Its CODATA recommended value is E_{h} = 4.3597447222060(48)×10^{−18} J = 27.211386245981(30) eV. The name "hartree" was suggested for this unit of energy.

The hartree is approximately the negative electric potential energy of the electron in a hydrogen atom in its ground state and, by the virial theorem, approximately twice its ionization energy; the relationships are not exact because of the finite mass of the nucleus of the hydrogen atom and relativistic corrections.

The hartree is usually used as a unit of energy in atomic physics and computational chemistry: for experimental measurements at the atomic scale, the electronvolt (eV) or the reciprocal centimetre (cm^{−1}) are much more widely used.

== Other relationships ==
$E_\mathrm{h} = {\hbar^2 \over {m_\mathrm{e} a^2_0}} = m_\mathrm{e}\left(\frac{e^2}{4\pi\varepsilon_0\hbar}\right)^2 = m_\mathrm{e} c^2 \alpha^2 = {\hbar c \alpha \over {a_0}}$

= 2 Ry = 2 R_{∞}hc
= 27.211386245981(30) eV
= 4.3597447222060(48)×10^{−18} J
= 4.3597447222060(48)×10^{−11} erg
≘ 2625.4996394799(50) kJ/mol
≘ 627.5094740631(12) kcal/mol
≘ 219474.63136320(43) cm^{−1}
≘ 6579.683920502(13) THz

where:

- ħ is the reduced Planck constant,
- m_{e} is the electron mass,
- e is the elementary charge,
- a_{0} is the Bohr radius,
- ε_{0} is the electric constant,
- c is the speed of light in vacuum, and
- α is the fine-structure constant.

Effective hartree units are used in semiconductor physics where $e^2$ is replaced by $e^2/\varepsilon$ and $\varepsilon$ is the static dielectric constant. Also, the electron mass is replaced by the effective band mass $m^*$. The effective hartree in semiconductors becomes small enough to be measured in millielectronvolts (meV).

== See also ==
- Rydberg constant
