= EH =

Eh is a spoken interjection in English, Italian, and Spanish. EH or eh may also refer to:

== Arts and media ==
- "Eh", a song by Death Grips from the album Bottomless Pit
- Eh? (play), a 1966 play by dramatist Henry Livings from London
- English Hymnal, published in 1906 for the Church of England
- Ernest Hemingway (1899–1961), American novelist, short story writer, and journalist

== Businesses and organizations ==
- ANA Wings (IATA airline code EH)
- EHang, a Chinese vehicle company (NASDAQ stock ticker EH)
- Eisenbahn und Häfen GmbH, a German rail freight company
- English Heritage, a registered charity that manages the National Heritage Collection of the UK
- Sociedad Anónima Ecuatoriana de Transportes Aéreos (IATA airline code EH)

== Places ==
- EH postcode area, Scotland, UK
- Eastern Hemisphere, global indicator used for journeys within or between TC Area 1 and Area 3
- Euskal Herria, Basque Country, Spain
- Eusoff Hall, National University of Singapore
- Western Sahara (ISO 3166-1:EH)
  - .eh, Internet country code top-level domain for the Western Sahara

== Science and technology ==
- Eh, a programming language developed at the University of Waterloo
- Exahenry, an SI unit of inductance
- Exception handling, in computer programming languages
- Holden EH, an early Australian Holden car
- Early Helladic, a period in Southern Balkan Prehistory
- Hartree (written E_{h}), an atomic unit of energy
- Reduction potential (written $E_{h}$), a chemical property
- Exponential hierarchy, a computational complexity class

== Other uses ==
- EH, an IATA airline code Air Nippon Network, now part of ANA Wings
- E. H. (alchemist), a 16th-century pseudonymous writer on alchemy
- Eh (Armenian letter)

== See also ==
- EHD (disambiguation)
- MEH (disambiguation)
- Heh (disambiguation)
