= Hah =

Hah or HAH may refer to:

- Laughter
- Air Comores International, a defunct airline
- Hah (Korean surname)
- Ḥāḥ, Assyrian village in eastern Turkey
- Hahon language
- Hang Hau station, in Hong Kong
- Heaven and Hell (Black Sabbath album), released in 1980
- Him & Her, a British television comedy series
- Heh (god), a figure in Egyptian mythology
- HAH, the IATA code for Prince Said Ibrahim International Airport in Moroni, Comoros

== See also ==
- Ha (disambiguation)
- Heh (disambiguation)
- Huh (disambiguation)
