= Wohu =

Wohu or Wo Hu or variation, may refer to:

== Places ==
- Wohu (卧虎镇), a town in Shuangliao, Jilin, China; see List of township-level divisions of Jilin
- Wo Hu Shan (卧虎山, Crouching Tiger Mountain), a bunker complex during the Taiyuan campaign
- Wo Hu Tun (卧虎屯, Crouching Tiger Village), a stronghold during the Battle of Siping

== People ==
- Wohu (斡忽), Prince of Ye (鄴王); son of Emperor Taizu of Jin

== Arts and entertainment ==
- Wo Hu (臥虎, Crouching Tiger), a 2006 Hong Kong crime drama film
- Crouching Tiger, Hidden Dragon (臥虎藏龍, "Wòhu Cánglóng"), a 2000 U.S. Mandarin-language wuxia Hollywood film

== Other uses ==
- をふ (wohu), a historical kana orthography

== See also ==
- Hudun (disambiguation) including 虎蹲 (crouching tiger)
- Crouching Tiger (disambiguation)
- Crouching Tiger, Hidden Dragon (disambiguation)
- WO (disambiguation)
- Hu (disambiguation)
