= Commandant Charcot =

Commandant Charcot may refer to:

- Jean-Baptiste Charcot, a French explorer often referred to by this title
- Le Commandant Charcot, an icebreaking cruise ship named after the explorer
- USS Lancewood, a US Navy netlaying ship, sold to France in 1946 and renamed Commandant Charcot, also after the explorer
