= WHU =

WHU commonly refers to:

- Wuhan University, Chinese university
- WHU – Otto Beisheim School of Management, German business school

It may also refer to:

- Wuhu Wanli Airport (IATA airport code WHU), Wuhu, Anhui, China
- West Ham United F.C., a football club in London
- Welsh Hockey Union
- Wahau Kayan (ISO language code: whu), a dialect of the Kayan people of Borneo

== See also ==
- Woo (disambiguation)
- Who (disambiguation)
- Wu (disambiguation)
