= Guess Who's Back (disambiguation) =

"Guess Who's Back" is a single by American rapper Scarface, featuring Jay-Z and Beanie Sigel.

"Guess Who's Back" may also refer to:

- "Guess Who's Back", a song by Rakim from the 1997 album The 18th Letter
- "Guess Who's Back", a skit by Eminem from the 2024 album The Death of Slim Shady (Coup de Grâce)
- Guess Who's Back (The Guess Who album), a 1978 album by the Guess Who
- Guess Who's Back?, a 2002 mixtape by 50 Cent

== See also ==
- Without Me (Eminem song), a single by Eminem from his 2002 album The Eminem Show
- Guess Who (disambiguation)
