= Hudun (disambiguation) =

Hudun is a town in Hudun District, Somaliland.

Hudun may also refer to:

- Hudun District, Somaliland
- Emperor Mo of Jin (1200-1234), with the personal name "Hudun" (呼敦)
- Hu dun pao (虎蹲砲; Crouching Tiger weapon), two different ancient weapons, a trebuchet and a cannon

== See also ==
- Hu (disambiguation)
- Dun (disambiguation)
- Crouching Tiger (disambiguation), including 虎蹲
- Wohu (disambiguation) including 臥虎 (crouching tiger)
- Hundun
