= Commandant Charcot Glacier Tongue =

Glacier tongue in Antarctica

Commandant Charcot Glacier Tongue (66°22′S 136°35′E) is a broad glacier tongue about 2 nautical miles (4 km) long extending seaward from Commandant Charcot Glacier. It was charted by the French Antarctic Expedition, 1950–52, and named by them for the French polar ship Commandant Charcot.
