= Torchwood (disambiguation) =

Torchwood is a British science-fiction television programme and subfranchise of the Whoniverse.

Torchwood may also refer to:

- wood used for torches
- Amyris, a genus of tree referred to as torchwood
- Ixora brachiata, a species of tree, see Kinnerasani Wildlife Sanctuary

== Whoniverse ==
- Torchwood (audio drama series)
- Torchwood (comics)
- Torchwood Institute, a fictional organization found in the Whoniverse, the titular institution of the eponymous television show Torchwood
  - Torchwood Hub, a fictional building in the Whoniverse, HQ featured in the TV programme
- Torchwood Magazine, a British print magazine
- Torchwood: Original Television Soundtrack, a 2008 album

== Other uses ==
- USS Torchwood, an Ailanthus-class net laying ship, AN-55/YN-74
- Torchwood, a type of plant in the PopCap video game franchise Plants vs. Zombies.

== See also ==
- Torchwood Declassified, a companion TV programme to Torchwood
- Whoniverse
- Doctor Who (disambiguation)
- Torch (disambiguation)
- Wood (disambiguation)
