= Boo hoo =

Boo hoo may refer to the sound of someone crying.

Boo hoo may also refer to:

- Boo Hoo, a 2002 album by musician Voltaire
- "Boo-Hoo", a 1937 hit song recorded by Guy Lombardo and His Royal Canadians
- "Boohoo", a 2009 song by Moka Only from the album Lowdown Suite 2… The Box
- Boo Hoo the Bear, the mascot of Queen's University, Kingston, Ontario, Canada
- Boohoo the Clown, a Machine Empire monster from the Power Rangers television series
- Boohoo.com, a UK online fashion retailer
- A priest of the Original Kleptonian Neo-American Church

== See also ==
- Boo (disambiguation)
- Hoo (disambiguation)
