= Ho-oh =

Ho-oh may refer to:

- Fenghuang, mythological birds in East Asia
- Ho-Oh, a legendary Pokémon resembling the fenghuang

== See also ==
- Hoo (disambiguation)
- Hydrogen peroxide, chemical formula HOOH
