= Doctor Who (disambiguation) =

Doctor Who is a long-running British science fiction series.

Doctor Who or Dr. Who may also refer to:

== Media based on the television series ==
- Whoniverse, the fictional universe of the British science-fiction programme Doctor Who
- The Doctor, the main character in the British television series
- Doctor Who (film), the television movie starring Paul McGann, based on the television series
- Dr. Who (Dalek films), the human character played by Peter Cushing in two films based on the television series
- Doctor Who (pinball), pinball machine based on the television series
- "Doctorin' the Tardis" a 1988 novelty mash-up song by The Timelords based on Doctor Who theme music

== Other uses ==
- "Doctor Who" (CSI), the 22nd episode of the 10th season of CSI: Crime Scene Investigation
- Dr. Who, the villain of The King Kong Show (1966–1969) and King Kong Escapes (1967)
- "Dr. Who!" (Tujamo and Plastik Funk song), titled "Dr. Who" and instrumental titled "Who"

=== The Doctor Who ===
- The Doctor Who Cloned Me, a single-player campaign supplement to the 2011 video game Duke Nukem Forever
- The Doctor Who Dared: William Osler, a 1959 biography by Iris Noble
- The Doctor Who Fooled the World, a 2020 non-fiction book by Brian Deer
- The Doctor Who Gave Up Drugs, a 2018 two-part television special featuring Chris van Tulleken
- The Doctor Who Hears Voices, a 2008 British television documentary
- The Doctor Who Held Hands, a 1929 novel by Hulbert Footner
- "The Doctor Who Makes People Walk Again?", Horizon (British) series 42, episode 4 (2005)

== See also ==
- Torchwood (disambiguation)
- Doctor (disambiguation)
- Who (disambiguation)
