= USS Papaya =

History

United States
- Name: USS Papaya
- Namesake: a fruit-bearing tree found in tropical America
- Builder: Pollock-Stockton Shipbuilding Company, Stockton, California
- Laid down: 2 November 1942 as Papaya (YN-68)
- Launched: 23 May 1943
- Sponsored by: Mrs. L. L. Lindley
- Commissioned: 1 December 1943 as USS Papaya (YN-68)
- Decommissioned: 31 January 1946, at Terminal Island, California
- Reclassified: AN-49, 20 January 1944
- Stricken: 25 February 1946
- Honours and awards: two battle stars for World War II service
- Fate: fate unknown

General characteristics
- Class & type: Ailanthus-class net laying ship
- Tonnage: 1,100 tons
- Displacement: 1,275 tons
- Length: 194 ft 7 in (59.31 m)
- Beam: 37 ft (11 m)
- Draft: 13 ft 6 in (4.11 m)
- Propulsion: diesel electric, 2,500hp
- Speed: 12 knots
- Complement: 56 officers and enlisted
- Armament: one single 3 in (76 mm) gun mount, four twin 20 mm gun mounts

USS Papaya (AN-49/YN-68) was an Ailanthus-class net laying ship which served with the U.S. Navy in the South Pacific Ocean theatre of operations during World War II. Her career was without major incident, and she returned home after the war bearing two battle stars to her credit.

== Launched in Stockton, California ==
Papaya (YN–68) was laid down by the Pollock-Stockton Shipbuilding Company, Stockton, California, 2 November 1942; launched 23 May 1943; sponsored by Mrs. L. L. Lindley; commissioned 1 December 1943. She was reclassified AN–49 on 20 January 1944.

== World War II service ==
=== Pacific Ocean operations ===
Following shakedown, Papaya joined ServRon 10 for duty in the Pacific Ocean and proceeded via Pearl Harbor to the Marshall Islands where she arrived 8 March 1944. After laying moorings and channel buoys and installing anti-torpedo nets in the Marshalls group, she departed for the Mariana Islands, arriving Saipan 1 August. She assisted in net operations while fighting on the beach was still in process, helping capture both Saipan and Tinian.

=== End-of-war operations ===
After returning to Long Beach, California, 18 December for overhaul and alterations, she deployed to the Western Pacific again 22 May 1945, this time to Ulithi, Caroline Islands, for important net operations.

Following the surrender of Japan, Papaya actively participated in the surrender and occupation of Yap and undertook several search missions to islands and atolls east of Ulithi capturing 26 Japanese soldiers. She departed 17 October for the United States via Saipan and Pearl Harbor and arrived San Diego, California, 26 November.

== Post-war decommissioning ==
Surplus to the Navy’s needs after World War II, Papaya decommissioned at Terminal Island, California, 31 January 1946 and was stricken from the Naval Register 25 February.

== Honors and awards ==
Papaya received two battle stars for service in World War II.
