= USS Spicewood =

History

United States
- Name: USS Spicewood
- Ordered: as YN-72
- Builder: Pollock-Stockton Shipbuilding Company, Stockton, California
- Laid down: 25 May 1943, as YN-72
- Launched: 6 December 1943
- Commissioned: 7 April 1944 as USS Spicewood (AN-53)
- Decommissioned: 20 February 1946, at San Pedro, California
- Reclassified: AN-53, 20 January 1944
- Stricken: 12 March 1946
- Honours and awards: one battle star during World War II
- Fate: Sold to Van Camp Seafood Company, Terminal Island, California on 18 April 1947

General characteristics
- Class & type: Ailanthus-class net laying ship
- Displacement: 1,460 tons
- Length: 194 ft 6 in (59.28 m)
- Beam: 34 ft 7 in (10.54 m)
- Draft: 11 ft 8 in (3.56 m)
- Propulsion: diesel electric, 2,500hp
- Speed: 12.1 knots
- Complement: 56 officers and enlisted
- Armament: one single 3 in (76 mm) gun mount, three twin 20 mm gun mounts

USS Spicewood (AN-53/YN-72) was an Ailanthus-class net laying ship which served with the U.S. Navy in the South Pacific Ocean theatre of operations during World War II. Her career was without major incident, and she returned home after the war bearing one battle star to her credit.

== Launched at Stockton, California ==
Spicewood was laid down as YN-72 on 25 May 1943 at Stockton, California, by the Pollock-Stockton Shipbuilding Company; redesignated AN-53 on 20 January 1944; launched on 6 December 1943; and commissioned on 7 April 1944.

== World War II service ==
The net layer completed shakedown training and post-shakedown availability by 19 June and towed fuel barge YO-92 from San Pedro, California, to Hawaii, arriving at Pearl Harbor on the 29th. There she was assigned to the 14th Naval District and relieved the Coast Guard tug Balsam (WAGL-62) at the Phoenix Islands, located east of the Gilbert and Ellice groups. Spicewood remained in that group of small atolls until late in the year.

She returned to Pearl Harbor on 4 December. On 14 February 1945, she sailed for Eniwetok, Ulithi, and Leyte. By mid-April, she was at Okinawa as an element of Task Force 51. There she operated with Task Group 52.8, the Net and Buoy Group, at Kerama Retto.

== End-of-war activity ==
Hostilities ceased in the western Pacific Ocean on 15 August, but Spicewood remained at Okinawa until late October. She headed for Pearl Harbor on the 29th and reached her destination on 17 November. After a week at Oahu, she continued east and made San Diego, California, on 4 December.

== Post-war decommissioning ==
She sailed from there to San Pedro, California, between 6 and 7 December and was decommissioned on 20 February 1946. Her name was struck from the Navy List on 12 March 1946, and her hulk was sold on 18 April 1947 to the Van Camp Seafood Company, Terminal Island, California.

== Honors and awards ==
Spicewood (AN-53) earned one battle star during World War II.
