= Hu =

HU or Hu may refer to:

== Arts and entertainment ==
- Hu Sanniang, a fictional character in the Water Margin, one of the Four Great Classical Novels of Chinese literature
- Tian Hu, one of the antagonists in the Water Margin
- Hollywood Undead, an American rap rock band
- The Hu, a Mongolian heavy metal band

== Language ==
- Hu (digraph), used primarily in Classical Nahuatl
- Fu (kana), also romanised as Hu, Japanese kana ふ and フ
- Hu language, of Yunnan, China
- Hungarian language (ISO 639 alpha-2 code 'hu')
- Ƕ (hwair), the ligature of H and u

== Mythology and religion ==
- Hu (mythology), the deification of the first word in the Egyptian mythology of the Ennead
- Huh (god), the deification of eternity in the Egyptian mythology of the Ogdoad
- Hu (Sufism), a name for God
- Hu (ritual baton), an early Chinese writing utensil later used in Daoist rituals
- Hú, a kachina in Hopi mythology
- Adir Hu, a hymn sung at the Passover Seder
- Hu Gadarn (or Hu the Mighty), a Welsh legendary figure
- HU, a mantra popularized by the religion Eckankar as a name for and love song to God

== People ==
- Hu (singer), an Italian singer-songwriter
- Hu (surname), a Chinese family name represented by the character 胡
- Hu (people), various "barbarian" peoples in Chinese history

== Places ==
- Shanghai, abbreviated Hù (沪/滬), the largest city in China
- Hu County, in Xi'an, Shaanxi, China
- Huy, Walloon name Hu, Belgian city
- Hu, Egypt, the modern name of an Egyptian town on the Nile, which in more ancient times was the capital of the 7th Nome of Upper Egypt
- Hanau, Germany, on vehicle registration plates
- Huesca, Spain, on vehicle registration plates
- Hungary, from it ISO 3166-1 alpha-2 country code
- HU postcode area, covering Hull and areas of East Riding of Yorkshire

== Universities ==
=== United States ===
- Hamline University in St. Paul, Minnesota, United States
- Hampton University a private, historically black university in Hampton, Virginia, United States
- Harding University in Searcy, Arkansas, United States
- Harrisburg University of Science and Technology a private research university located in Harrisburg, Pennsylvania, United States
- Harvard University in Cambridge, Massachusetts, United States
- Hofstra University in New York, United States
- Hollins University in Roanoke, Virginia, United States
- Howard University in Washington DC, United States
- Husson University in Bangor, Maine, United States

=== Other countries ===
- Habib University in Karachi, Sindh, Pakistan
- Haigazian University in Beirut, Lebanon
- Hajvery University in Lahore, Punjab, Pakistan
- Hamdard University in Karachi, Sindh, Pakistan
- Hashemite University in Zarqa, Jordan
- Hazara University in Mansehra, Khyber Pakhtunkhwa, Pakistan
- Helwan University, the largest university in Egypt
- Henan University in Kaifeng, Henan, China
- HITEC University in Taxila, Punjab, Pakistan
- Humboldt University of Berlin in Berlin, Germany
- Hunan University in Changsha, Hunan, China
- Hongik University in South Korea
- HU University of Applied Sciences Utrecht, the Netherlands

== Other uses ==
- .hu, the Internet country code top-level domain for Hungary
- Hu (vessel), a type of ancient Chinese bronze vessel
- Hainan Airlines (IATA airline code HU)
- Holographic Universe, in quantum gravity and string theories
- Hounsfield Units, on the Hounsfield scale, a unit of measurement used on a computed tomography machine (CAT)
- HU, a bacterial histone-like DNA-binding protein
- HU, handling unit
- Wu Hu (disambiguation), an ancient Chinese term for multiple groups in China
- Halo: Uprising, a comic book series

== See also ==
- Hoo (disambiguation)
- Who (disambiguation)
- Huh (disambiguation)
