= Crouching Tiger (disambiguation) =

Crouching Tiger (虎蹲, hu-dun; or; 臥虎, wo-hu) may refer to:

== Arts and entertainment ==
- Crouching Tiger, Hidden Dragon (臥虎藏龍), a 2000 U.S. Mandarin-language wuxia Hollywood film
- Crouching Tiger (picture book), a picture book by Ying Chang Compestine
- Wo Hu (臥虎, English: Crouching Tiger), a 2006 Hong Kong crime drama film

== Military ==
- Hu dun pao ("crouching tiger cannon"), a name given to a Ming dynasty bombard weapon and a Song dynasty trebuchet
- Crouching Tiger Mountain (卧虎山, Wo Hu Shan), a bunker complex during the Taiyuan campaign
- Crouching Tiger Village (卧虎屯, Wo Hu Tun), a stronghold during the Battle of Siping

== See also ==
- Wohu (disambiguation) including 臥虎 (crouching tiger)
- Hudun (disambiguation) including 虎蹲 (crouching tiger)
- Crouching Tiger, Hidden Dragon (disambiguation)
- Paayum Puli (disambiguation) (lit. 'Pouncing Tiger'), various Indian films
- Tiger (disambiguation)
