= Hoo =

Hoo or HOO may refer to:

== People ==
- Hoo (surname), including a list of people with the name
- Thomas Hoo, Baron Hoo and Hastings (c. 1396 – 1455)

== Places ==
- Hoo, Suffolk, a village near Kettleburgh, England
- Hoo Peninsula, in Kent, England
  - Hoo St Werburgh, or simply Hoo
  - Hoo Fort
  - Hoo Junction railway station
  - St Mary Hoo, a village on the Hoo Peninsula
- Hoo Stack, an island off Nesting, Shetland, Scotland
- The Hoo, Hampstead, a house in the London Borough of Camden
- The Hoo, a small hill outside Chipping Campden, Gloucestershire
- The Hoo, Great Gaddesden, a country house in Hertfordshire
- The Hoo, Willingdon and Jevington, a country house in East Sussex by Edwin Lutyens
- Mount Hōō, in Yamanashi Prefecture, Japan
- Hooton railway station, Cheshire, England, station code HOO
- Sutton Hoo, a medieval burial site in Suffolk, England

== Other uses ==
- Hoo (film), a 2010 Indian film
- Hōō, Japanese name for the fenghuang
- ISO 639:hoo, the Holoholo language, a Bantu language of DR Congo
- Croatian Olympic Committee (Croatian: Hrvatski olimpijski odbor (HOO))
- Hoo, an alternative name for the fish species called Wahoo

== See also ==
- Hoohoo (disambiguation)
- Hooe (disambiguation)
- Hu (disambiguation)
- Who (disambiguation)
