= USS Viburnum =

Ailanthus class vessel

History

United States
- Name: USS Viburnum
- Namesake: A large genus of shrubs or trees related to the honeysuckle family.
- Builder: Pollock-Stockton Shipbuilding Company, Stockton, California
- Laid down: laid down as YN-76
- Launched: 26 April 1944
- Sponsored by: Mrs. R. F. Chavin, the wife of Brigadier General R. F. Chavin, USA
- Commissioned: 2 June 1944
- Decommissioned: 12 July 1945, at San Diego, California
- In service: 12 July 1945
- Out of service: 3 January 1946
- Reclassified: AN-57 on 1 January 1944
- Stricken: 21 January 1945
- Fate: transferred to the United States Maritime Commission on 12 August 1947; fate unknown

General characteristics
- Class & type: Ailanthus-class net laying ship
- Displacement: 1,460 tons
- Length: 194 ft 6 in (59.28 m)
- Beam: 34 ft 7 in (10.54 m)
- Draft: 11 ft 8 in (3.56 m)
- Propulsion: diesel electric, 2,500hp
- Speed: 12.1 knots
- Complement: 56 officers and enlisted
- Armament: one single 3 in (76 mm) dual purpose gun mount; three twin 20 mm AA gun mounts
- Armor: wooden-hulled

USS Viburnum (AN-57/YN-76) was a Ailanthus-class net laying ship which served with the U.S. Navy in the Pacific Ocean theatre of operations. While operating in the Caroline Islands, she was severely damaged when struck by what appeared to be a Japanese torpedo. However, she continued her work as well as she could, and, when she returned to the United States, she was considered too damaged to repair. She was sold in her damaged condition, and was eventually scrapped.

== Constructed in California ==
Viburnum (AN-57) -- a wooden-hulled, net-laying ship—was originally classified as YN-76 when the ship's keel was laid on 9 December 1943 at Stockton, California, by the Pollock-Stockton Shipbuilding Company. Re-classified to AN-57 on 1 January 1944, the ship was launched on 26 April 1944; sponsored by Mrs. R. F. Chavin, the wife of Brigadier General R. F. Chavin, USA, the commanding officer of the United States Army's Stockton Ordnance Depot. Viburnum was commissioned at the Pollock-Stockton yard on 2 June 1944.

== World War II service ==
=== Pacific Ocean operations ===
After shakedown out of the Naval Net Depot, Tiburon Bay, California, and post-shakedown repairs and alterations at Long Beach, California, Viburnum departed Treasure Island, San Francisco, California, on 15 August, bound for Pearl Harbor with two high-speed sled targets in tow. The net-layer reached Pearl Harbor on 27 August, delivered her tows, and subsequently pushed on for Majuro, in the Marshall Islands, where she arrived on 15 September. Assigned to Service Squadron 10, Viburnum shifted to Ulithi, in the Caroline Islands, soon afterwards.

On 28 October 1944, Viburnum was tending the net installation at Doa Channel, Naval Base Ulithi. Late that morning, she picked up a net section from the depot ship Tuscana (AKN-3) and proceeded to stretch a double net section early in the afternoon.

=== Struck by a Japanese mine ===
In 1457, a sudden, violent explosion blew the port side of the forecastle deck upward, and the ship's commanding officer, Lt. Smith, ordered all hands to stand by to abandon ship. The blast had killed two men and blown a dozen others over the side. The latter were swiftly rescued by a boat from Volans (AKS-9). Arapaho (ATF-68) came alongside Viburnum at 1550, joined shortly afterwards by Zuni (ATF-95); the latter consequently moored the stricken net-layer alongside the destroyer tender Dixie (AD-14) for a thorough check of the damage.

The ensuing investigation revealed that a Japanese submarine mine had blown a hole in the starboard side of the ship extending 10 frames' length (from frame 10 to frame 20) and to a point within five feet of the main deck. The explosion had broken the keel, and the hole extended about eight feet up from the keel on the port side. In the ensuing days, a work crew from ARB-6 cleared away the wreckage, and the ship's force recovered the bodies of the two men killed. From November 1944 to January 1945, Viburnum received repairs from Jason (ARH-1) and Vestal (AR-4) before she was docked in floating drydock AFDL-32 and repaired enough to resume active operations about 9 February 1945.

=== End-of-war operations ===
Viburnum remained at Ulithi, performing limited harbor work in a protected harbor into the spring of 1945. She sailed for the west coast of the United States on 9 May, stopped briefly at Pearl Harbor en route, and arrived at San Francisco, California, on 5 June.

== Post-war evaluation and disposition ==
Due to the heavy workload on west coast yards for repairs to damaged combatant vessels, the Navy did not desire full restoration of Viburnum. Accordingly, the net-laying ship was decommissioned and placed in an "in-service" status on 12 July 1945.

Viburnum was placed out of service on 3 January 1946, and her disposal was authorized on 17 January. Her name was struck from the Navy list on 21 January, and the former net-layer was transferred to the United States Maritime Commission on 12 August 1947. The vessel was simultaneously delivered to Walter K. Wilms and Co., at Suisun Bay, and was probably scrapped soon afterwards.
