= Paayum Puli =

Paayum Puli (transl. Pouncing Tiger) may refer to these Indian Tamil-language-films:

- Paayum Puli (1983 film)
- Paayum Puli (2015 film)

== See also ==
- Payum Puli, a 2007 Indian Malayalam-language film
- Crouching Tiger (disambiguation)
