= Who =

Who or WHO most commonly refers to:

- Who (pronoun), an interrogative or relative pronoun
- World Health Organization, a specialized agency of the United Nations for public health

Who or WHO may also refer to:

== Arts, entertainment and media ==
=== Fictional characters ===
- Who, a creature in the Dr. Seuss books Horton Hears a Who! and How the Grinch Stole Christmas!
- Who, a first baseman in the Abbott and Costello routine "Who's on First?"

=== Film ===
- Who (film), a 2018 Indian film
- Who? (film), a 1974 English film adaptation of Algis Budrys' novel (see below), directed by Jack Gold

=== Music ===
- The Who, an English rock band

==== Albums ====
- Who (album), by The Who, 2019
- Who? (album), by Tony! Toni! Toné!, 1988

==== Songs ====
- "Who?" (song), written by Jerome Kern, Otto Harbach, and Oscar Hammerstein II, 1925
- "Who", by David Byrne and St. Vincent from Love This Giant, 2012
- "Who", by Diana Ross from Silk Electric, 1982
- "Who", by Disturbed from Immortalized, 2015
- "Who" (song), by Jimin from Muse, 2024
- "Who", by Lauv from How I'm Feeling, 2020
- "Who", by Moonbin & Sanha, 2022
- "Who", by MUNA from Saves the World, 2019
- "Who", by Neil Cicierega from Mouth Moods, 2017
- "Who", by Sugababes, a B-side of the single "Hole in the Head", 2003
- "Who", by Zayn from the film Ghostbusters, 2016
- "Who...", by Ayumi Hamasaki from Loveppears, 1999
- "Who", written by Irving Berlin, c. 1922–1926
- "The Who", by Hieroglyphics from 3rd Eye Vision, 1998
- "WHO?", by Stray Kids from the EP I Am Who, 2018

=== Other uses in arts, entertainment and media ===
- WHO (AM), a radio station in Des Moines, Iowa, US
- WHO-DT, a television station in Des Moines, Iowa, US
- Who (magazine), an Australian entertainment magazine
- Who? (novel), by Algis Budrys, 1958
- W.H.O, an organisation in Marvel Comics

== Other uses ==
- Who (pronoun), an interrogative or relative pronoun
- World Health Organization, a specialized agency of the United Nations for public health
- Who?, one of the Five Ws in journalism
- who (Unix), a Unix command
- White House Office, an entity within the Executive Office of the President of the United States
- Jim Neidhart (1955–2018), American professional wrestler with the ring name Who

== See also ==
- Doctor Who (disambiguation)
- Guess Who (disambiguation)
- Hoo (disambiguation)
- Hu (disambiguation)
- Woo (disambiguation)
- Who? Who? ministry, a 19th-century British government
- Who's Who, several reference publications
