= USS Winterberry =

1944 Ailanthus-class net laying ship

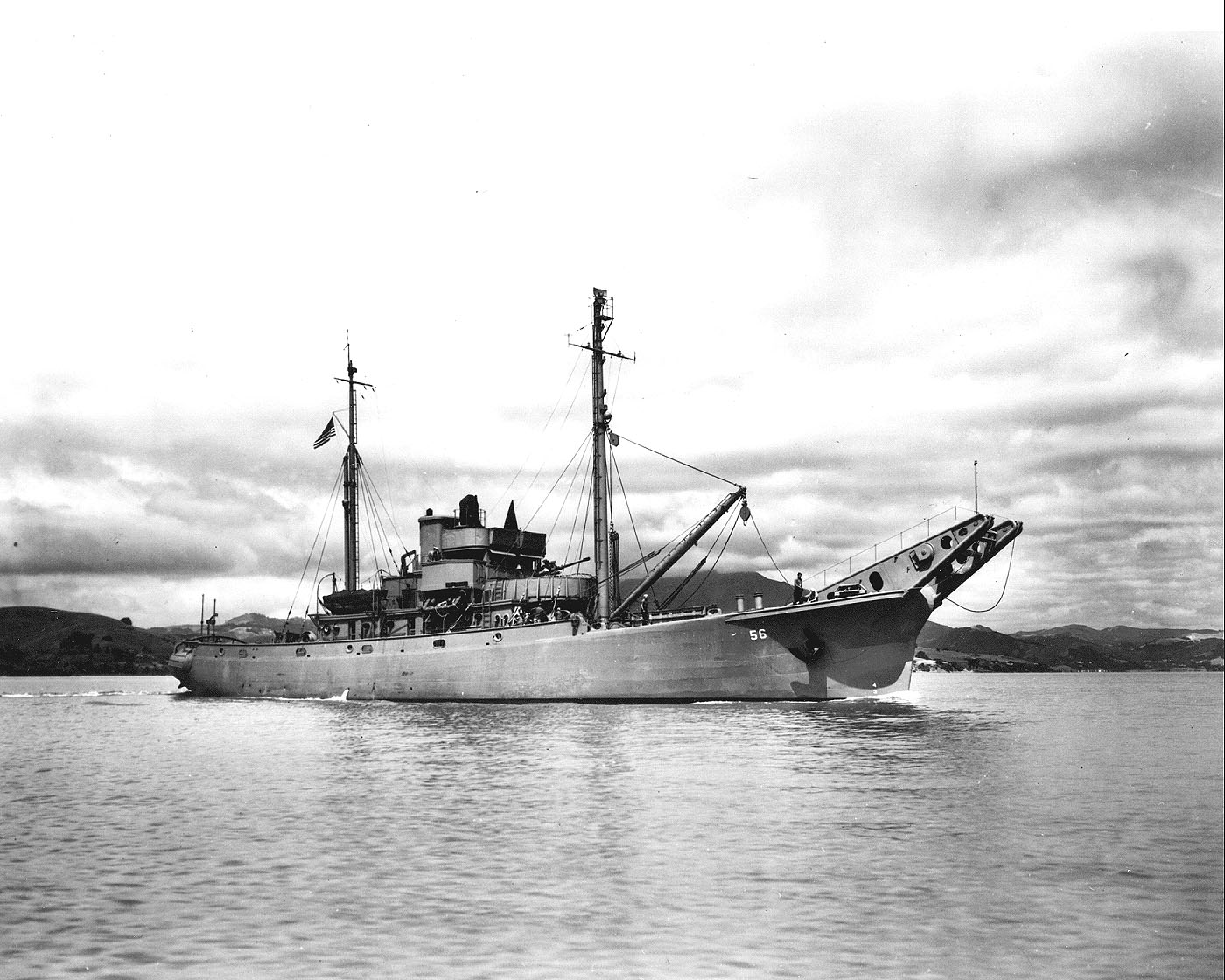

History

United States
- Name: USS Winterberry
- Namesake: Any of a variety of American hollies which bear bright red berries during the winter
- Builder: Pollock-Stockton Shipbuilding Company, Stockton, California
- Laid down: September 1943 as (YN-75)
- Launched: 22 March 1944
- Commissioned: 30 May 1944 as USS Winterberry (AN-56)
- Decommissioned: 15 February 1946, at San Diego, California
- Reclassified: AN-56, 20 January 1944
- Stricken: 26 February 1946
- Honours and awards: one battle star for World War II service
- Fate: Sold, 31 March 1947; fate unknown

General characteristics
- Class & type: Ailanthus-class net laying ship
- Displacement: 1,460 tons
- Length: 194 ft 6 in (59.28 m)
- Beam: 34 ft 7 in (10.54 m)
- Draft: 11 ft 8 in (3.56 m)
- Propulsion: diesel electric, 2,500hp
- Speed: 12.1 knots
- Complement: 56 officers and enlisted
- Armament: one single 3 in (76 mm) gun mount, three twin 20 mm gun mounts

USS Winterberry (AN-56/YN-75) was an Ailanthus-class net laying ship which served with the United States Navy in the Pacific Ocean theatre of operations during World War II. Despite being attacked near Okinawa by enemy suicide planes, she managed to return safely home after the war with the ship bearing one battle star.

== Launched in California ==
Winterberry (AN-56) -- originally projected as Tupelo (YN-75) -- was laid down on 17 September 1943 at Stockton, California, by the Pollock-Stockton Shipbuilding Company; reclassified an auxiliary net-laying ship and redesignated AN-56 on 20 January 1944; launched on 22 March 1944; and commissioned on 30 May 1944.

== World War II service ==
=== Pacific theatre operations ===
Following preliminary operations along the California coast, Winterberry departed San Pedro, California, on 30 July and headed west. The net-laying ship arrived in Pearl Harbor on 10 August and remained there for almost a month. She stood out of Pearl Harbor on 5 September to resume her voyage westward. Winterberry stopped briefly at Johnston Island on 9 September and reached Majuro Atoll on the 15th.

Records regarding Winterberry's service between mid-September 1944 and the time of the Okinawa invasion in April 1945 are fragmentary and imprecise. She appears to have served at Majuro, Guam, Ulithi, and in the Palau Islands. In November, she was definitely at Kossol Roads in the Palau group because she reported sighting a submarine at 0858 on the 19th while she was laying torpedo nets at the west entrance to the roadstead. She indicated that the submarine submerged and surfaced three times in the space of two minutes and then moved off before auxiliary motor minesweeper USS YMS-33 belatedly got underway to investigate. That submarine probably was RO-37, which USS Conklin (DE-439) and USS McCoy Reynolds (DE-440) sank later that day about 20 miles north of the west entrance.

=== Supporting the Okinawa invasion ===
While it is conceivable that she was in the neighborhood of the Ryukyu Islands for the preliminary occupation of the roadstead at Kerama Retto, no hard evidence supports the conclusion. In any event, she was off Okinawa on 1 April 1945, D-day for the invasion of that bitterly contested island. By the 7th, she had moved to Ulithi. Winterberry was back at Okinawa by 28 May. At 0730 that day, an enemy plane attacked the ships assembled in Buckner Bay. Winterberry opened fire, but the enemy succeeded in crashing into one of the attack transports.

=== Attacked by aircraft ===
Fifteen minutes later, three more dive bombers raided the anchorage. They dove in from the sun and immediately drew antiaircraft fire. Winterberry opened up with her guns and assisted in bringing down two of the three raiders. At the height of that melee, a Japanese "Val" swooped on the anchorage. Winterberry could not fire on this enemy because friendly ships were in her line of fire, but the other ships brought him down.

During the early afternoon of 3 June, she again assisted in downing a kamikaze. At 1912 on the 11th, she joined the antiaircraft barrage when a single "Val" swooped down out of a heavy cloud cover. Oblivious to the curtain of gunfire, he dove at dock landing ship USS Lindenwald (LSD-6). He overshot the dock landing ship, climbed, did a wingover and entered his second suicide dive. This time, he chose a victory ship; but the antiaircraft fire, which he had ignored so contemptuously, cut his mission short. Winterberry's guns combined with those of the other ships in the area to splash the kamikaze but a scant few yards short of his intended victim.

=== End-of-war operations ===
During the waning months of World War II, Winterberry continued to serve at Okinawa. On 5 August, she departed the Ryukyus, bound for Saipan where she arrived on the 11th. The cessation of hostilities on 15 August found her still at Saipan. However, on the 20th, she got underway for Iwo Jima. The net-layer reached her destination three days later and operated in the Volcano Islands—at Iwo Jima and at Chichi Jima—until late in October. On 24 October, she departed Iwo Jima to return to the United States.

== Post-war disposition ==
After stops at Saipan, Eniwetok, Johnston Island, and Pearl Harbor, she entered San Diego, California, harbor on 29 November and reported to the Commandant, 11th Naval District, for disposal. She was decommissioned at San Diego on 15 February 1946, and her name was struck from the Navy list on 26 February 1946. The former net-layer was subsequently transferred to the U.S. Maritime Commission for final disposition. She was sold to Joe Medina Enterprises, of San Diego, California, on 31 March 1947.

== Honors and awards ==
Winterberry earned one battle star for World War II.
