= USS Manchineel =

WWII US Navy ship

History

United States
- Name: USS Manchineel
- Namesake: A poisonous tropical American tree of the spurge family of shrubby plants having a blistering milky juice and apple shaped fruit
- Ordered: as Sumac (YN-73)
- Builder: Pollock-Stockton Shipbuilding Company, Stockton, California
- Laid down: 8 June 1943 as Manchineel (YN-73)
- Launched: 1 January 1944
- Commissioned: 26 April 1944 as USS Manchineel (AN-54)
- Decommissioned: 11 March 1946, at Mare Island Navy Yard
- Renamed: Manchineel, 3 April 1943
- Reclassified: AN-54, 20 January 1944
- Stricken: 12 April 1946
- Fate: transferred to the U.S. Maritime Commission, 18 June 1947

General characteristics
- Class & type: Ailanthus-class net laying ship
- Displacement: 1,460 tons
- Length: 194 ft 6 in (59.28 m)
- Beam: 34 ft 7 in (10.54 m)
- Draft: 11 ft 8 in (3.56 m)
- Propulsion: diesel electric, 2,500hp
- Speed: 12.1 knots
- Complement: 56 officers and enlisted
- Armament: one single 3 in (76 mm) gun mount, three twin 20 mm gun mounts

USS Manchineel (AN-54/YN-73) was an Ailanthus-class net-laying ship which served with the U.S. Navy in the South Pacific Ocean during World War II. It managed to survive the war without incident, and returned to the United States post-war for decommissioning.

== Launched at Stockton, California ==
YN 73, originally named Sumac, was renamed Manchineel 3 April 1943; laid down 8 June 1943 by Pollock-Stockton Shipbuilding Company, Stockton, California; launched 1 January 1944; sponsored by Mrs. Warren Atherton; redesignated AN-54 20 January 1944; and commissioned 26 April 1944.

== World War II service ==
=== South Pacific operations ===
Following shakedown off San Pedro, California, Manchineel departed 22 June for the South Pacific Ocean, arriving Pearl Harbor 1 July. It operated off Pearl Harbor until 5 September when it sailed for the Marshall Islands, arriving at Majuro Atoll the 15th. After removing the nets around the atoll, Manchineel continued on to Kwajalein 22 September, arriving 4 days later for net-tending duties until 20 May 1945.

The net-laying ship then steamed for the Gilbert Islands, arriving Tarawa 23 May to pick up six pontoon barges for tow to Majuro. The trip took 6 long days of retrieving and dragging the water filled pontoons. Manchineel returned to Kwajalein 2 June to resume net operations.

Except for a week at Eniwetok in July, Manchineel remained in the Kwajalein area through the announcement of Japan’s surrender 15 August.

== Post-war decommissioning ==
On 10 October the ship departed for the U.S. West Coast via Pearl Harbor, arriving San Francisco, California, 3 November for mooring duty.

Manchineel decommissioned 11 March 1946, was stripped at Mare Island Naval Shipyard, and was struck from the Navy list 12 April. On 18 June 1947 Manchineel was transferred to the U.S. Maritime Commission and delivered to Walter H. Wilms following sale 2 days earlier.
