= USS Silverbell =

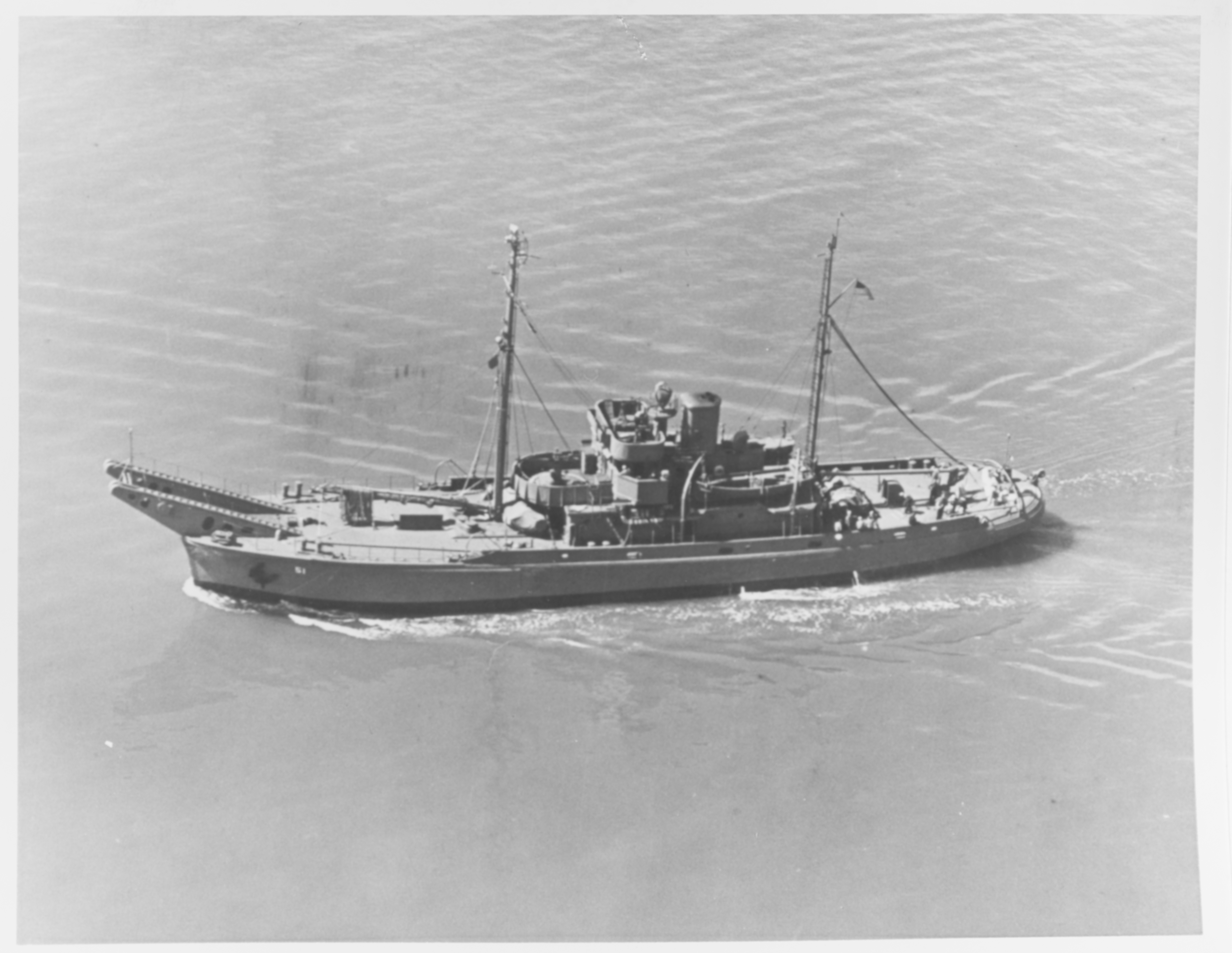
- USS Silverbell (AN-51) in 1944

History

United States
- Name: USS Silverbell (YN-70)
- Namesake: Silverbell
- Builder: Pollock-Stockton Shipbuilding Company, Stockton, California
- Laid down: 7 November 1942
- Launched: 19 June 1943
- Sponsored by: Mrs. Henry Ohm
- Reclassified: AN-51, 20 January 1944
- Commissioned: 16 February 1944
- Decommissioned: 10 January 1947, Shanghai, China
- Stricken: 28 January 1947
- Honors and awards: one battle star for World War II service
- Fate: Transferred to Republic of China Maritime Customs Service for use as a buoy and lighthouse tender

General characteristics
- Class & type: Ailanthus-class net laying ship
- Displacement: 1,275 tons
- Length: 194 ft 6 in (59.28 m)
- Beam: 34 ft 7 in (10.54 m)
- Draft: 11 ft 8 in (3.56 m)
- Propulsion: diesel electric, 2,500hp
- Speed: 12 knots (22 km/h)
- Complement: 57 officers and enlisted
- Armament: one single 3 in (76 mm) gun mount, four twin 20 mm gun mounts

USS Silverbell (AN-51/YN-70) was an Ailanthus-class net laying ship which served with the U.S. Navy in the South Pacific Ocean theatre of operations during World War II. Her career was without major incident, and she returned home after the war bearing one battle star to her credit.

== Launched in California ==
Silverbell (AN-51) was laid down on 7 November 1942 as YN-70 by Pollock-Stockton Shipbuilding Company, Stockton, California, launched on 19 June 1943; sponsored by Mrs. Henry Ohm; redesignated as AN-51 on 20 January 1944; and commissioned on 16 February 1944.

== World War II support ==
=== Pacific Ocean operations ===
Silverbell sailed from San Francisco, California, on 30 March to conduct shakedown training in the San Diego, California, area and returned on 1 April. The next day, she stood out of San Francisco en route to Manus Island, Admiralty Islands. She operated between there and Biak (Netherlands East Indies) until mid-September.

On the 24th, the net layer sailed for Leyte Gulf to support the landings there. She operated between Leyte, Manila, and Subic Bay until 17 November 1945 when she was ordered to return to San Pedro, California, via Pearl Harbor and San Francisco, for disposal.

Silverbell arrived in San Pedro, California, on 9 January 1946 and remained there until 3 July when she sailed for China via Pearl Harbor, Guam, and Subic Bay, Philippine Islands. The net layer remained in the Philippine Islands from 14 September to 22 December when she proceeded to Shanghai, arriving on 29 December 1946.

== Post WWII service ==
Silverbell arrived at San Francisco 21 Dec 45 for disposal. On 10 January 1947, she was transferred to the Chinese Maritime Customs for use as a buoy and lighthouse tender. She was ordered to Shanghai in May 1946. She departed Subic Bay en route on 22 Dec 1946. She was decommissioned at Shanghai and turned over to Chinese Maritime Customs via Foreign Liquidation Commission on 10 Jan. 1947. She was struck from the Navy List on 28 January 1947. She escaped to Taiwan during Chinese Civil War and served in the Taiwanese Customs Preventive Service, scrapped 1974.

== Honors and awards ==
Silverbell received one battle star for World War II service.
