= USS Tuscana =

Cargo ship of the United States Navy

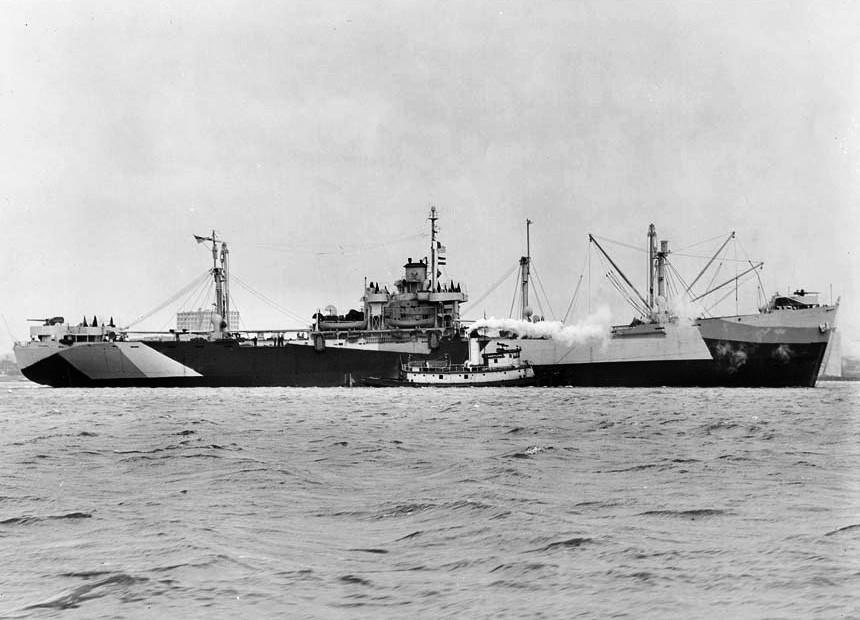
- Tuscana in Chesapeake Bay near Baltimore, 5 April 1944

History

United States
- Builder: Bethlehem-Fairfield Shipyard, Baltimore, Maryland
- Laid down: 5 December 1943
- Launched: 29 December 1943
- Acquired: 8 January 1944
- Commissioned: 28 March 1944
- Decommissioned: 28 January 1946
- Stricken: 25 February 1946
- Honours and awards: 2 battle stars (World War II)
- Fate: Scrapped, 1967

General characteristics
- Class & type: Indus-class net cargo ship
- Displacement: 14,350 long tons (14,580 t) full
- Length: 441 ft 6 in (134.57 m)
- Beam: 56 ft 11 in (17.35 m)
- Draft: 28 ft 4 in (8.64 m)
- Speed: 12.5 knots (23.2 km/h; 14.4 mph)
- Complement: 228 officers and enlisted
- Armament: 1 × 5 in (130 mm) gun; 4 × 40 mm guns; 12 × 20 mm guns

USS Tuscana (AKN-3) was an Indus-class net cargo ship in the service of the United States Navy in World War II. Probably named after a variant spelling of the constellation Tucana, it was the only ship of the Navy to bear this name.

Tuscana was laid down 5 December 1943 as liberty ship SS William R. Cox (MCE hull 2406) by Bethlehem-Fairfield Shipyard Inc., Baltimore, Maryland, under a Maritime Commission contract; launched on 29 December 1943; sponsored by Miss Cheshire Cox; acquired by the Navy under bareboat charter and renamed Tuscana on 8 January 1944; converted to a net cargo ship at Baltimore by the Maryland Drydock Co.; and commissioned on 28 March 1944.

== Service history ==
=== Marshall Islands ===
Tuscana arrived at Hampton Roads, Virginia on 6 April 1944 and operated out of that port, conducting drills and shakedown in Chesapeake Bay. On 26 April, she set her course via the Canal Zone for Hawaii. She entered Pearl Harbor on 23 May, provisioned, took on passengers, and got underway for the Marshalls on 26 May.

She arrived at Kwajalein on 5 June; got underway on 27 June, steaming with barge YC-1008 in tow; and arrived at Eniwetok on 29 June. On 20 July, while attempting to transfer a passenger to Vega (AK-17) during a rain squall, Tuscana's Buoy Boat No. 1 became stranded on a reef. When pounding seas forced the boat's crew to abandon her, a boat from destroyer Downes (DD-375) came to the rescue and saved all hands. On 27 July, Tuscana departed Eniwetok, with other net cargo ships and an escort, and set her course for the Marianas.

=== Mariana Islands ===
Tuscana anchored at Garapan on 1 August, detached men and cargo for the operation of harbor and waterfront facilities, and on 7 August began net operations. Throughout the remainder of the month, Tuscana's crew labored to assemble and launch anti-torpedo nets which were towed into place and installed by the smaller net laying ships (ANs). On this, her first net laying assignment, Tuscana provided nets to protect Mutcho Point and Garapan harbor from submarine attack. After completing this vital task, Tuscana arrived at Pearl Harbor on 11 September and began loading stores, buoys, and net materials.

=== Ulithi ===
On 19 September, she got underway with a slow convoy of eight ships and three escorts bound for the Marshalls. After a few days at Eniwetok, she continued on toward the Carolines and arrived at Ulithi on 9 October. Here, conferences on net laying took place on board the ship. Then, on 15 October, Tuscana's crew began net assembly. On 26 October, she began delivering nets to smaller net laying ships which towed them into place and installed them to protect the lagoon anchorage. On 28 October, Tuscana assembled the last net of this operation. The same day, Viburnum (AN-57), a member of the task unit working with Tuscana, struck a Japanese mine which caused severe damage to the net layer and underscored the ever-present hazards of warfare in the Pacific.

Tuscana embarked passengers on 11 November and, on the following day, got underway and steamed via Eniwetok to the Hawaiian Islands. Throughout most of December, she remained at Pearl Harbor undergoing repairs. Then, on 27 December, she set her course again for the Marshalls and spent a week at Eniwetok before proceeding on to the western Carolines. Shortly after midday on 20 January 1945, she passed through Mugai Channel and anchored at Ulithi. Although hampered at first by rough seas. Tuscana supplied moorings and assembled 1,260 yards of anti-torpedo net for Towachi Channel and an additional 6,390 yards for use elsewhere in the approaches to Ulithi. On 12 February 1945, her assignment completed, she departed Ulithi.

=== Okinawa ===
In March, she underwent drydocking at Pearl Harbor; then took on cargo and passengers. She returned to Ulithi on 4 April 1945, and, on 12 April, departed that port steaming in convoy for Okinawa. She anchored off the Hagushi landing beaches on 18 April. Near dusk each evening, the general alarm sounded, a regular reminder of the danger of Japanese air raiders. On 2 May, sailors on board Tuscana saw the flash of firing off the ship's starboard quarter and later observed the glow of an explosion which they thought marked the fiery end of a Japanese suicide boat. On 6 May, Tuscana began to assemble nets and moorings to screen the anchorage.

Early in the day on 28 May, as Tuscana lay anchored in Buckner Bay, a swarm of kamikazes attacked. For Tuscana, the action began at 07:25, when a Japanese airplane crashed into a merchant ship only 800 yards off her starboard bow. For over 30 minutes, Tuscana fought off the airborne raiders. At 07:35, a suicide plane crashed into Sandoval (APA-194). Soon thereafter, Tuscana opened fire on her first enemy plane; and, moments later, another came in toward her port bow. Tuscana's guns opened on the attacker and kept it under fire until it disappeared in the low overcast. At 07:44, she engaged a third aircraft and splashed it 600 yards off the port bow. She then turned her attention to the rescue of two survivors from Sandoval. At 07:55, yet another Japanese plane came in range, and Tuscana splashed this raider some three miles away. During the fight, Tuscana lost her starboard mainmast boom, which was toppled and damaged beyond operational use, and her topping lift was carried away by friendly fire. At 0758, Tuscana's guns opened on the last of the attackers and ceased fire five minutes later, just as a kamikaze crashed merchant ship SS Josiah Snelling. At 09:00, the all clear was sounded, and Tuscana emerged from her encounter with the enemy without personnel loss and with the knowledge of having assisted in the splashing of two enemy planes.

During an early afternoon alert on 3 June 1945, Tuscana's gunners splashed a Japanese aircraft only 500 yards off her starboard quarter. On 6 June, she got underway and proceeded via Saipan and the Hawaiian Islands to the California coast. On 6 July, she anchored in San Francisco Bay to begin a prolonged period of overhaul. While the ship underwent extensive repairs, members of her crew attended schools in damage control, fire fighting, and radar. During this interlude, hostilities ended in the Pacific.

=== Post-war activities ===
Late in August, Tuscana completed dock trials and tests; then provisioned and got underway on 7 September. Steaming via Pearl Harbor, she arrived at Okinawa on 14 October and began discharging her cargo. Later in the month, as she was proceeding to Japan, she sighted and destroyed a floating mine. The ship anchored at Sasebo on 25 October. She returned to Okinawa in November; then continued on to Hawaii; and reached Pearl Harbor on 10 December. She discharged passengers and cargo there; and, on 14 December, she set her course for Balboa. Steaming via the Panama Canal, she arrived at Norfolk on 11 January 1946.

=== Decommissioning and sale ===
The net cargo ship was decommissioned on 28 January 1946 and returned to the War Shipping Administration the next day. Her name was struck from the Navy List on 25 February 1946. Laid up under the name William R. Cox, the ship remained in custody of the Maritime Administration until she was sold in the late 1960s to Horton Industries, Inc., and scrapped in 1967.

== Awards ==
Tuscana received two battle stars for World War II service.
