= USS Cinnamon =

1943 Ailanthus-class net laying ship

History

United States
- Name: USS Royal Palm (YN-69)
- Namesake: Cinnamon
- Builder: Pollock-Stockton Shipbuilding Company, Stockton, California
- Laid down: date unknown
- Launched: 6 June 1943
- Sponsored by: Mrs. E. R. Ward
- Renamed: Cinnamon, 7 December 1943
- Completed: 10 January 1944
- Commissioned: 10 January 1944
- Reclassified: AN-50, 20 January 1944
- Decommissioned: 25 March 1947, at Shanghai, China
- Home port: San Pedro, California
- Honors and awards: one battle star for World War II service
- Fate: transferred to Nationalist China through the U.S. State Department

General characteristics
- Class & type: Ailanthus-class net laying ship
- Displacement: 1,275 tons
- Length: 194 ft 6 in (59.28 m)
- Beam: 34 ft 7 in (10.54 m)
- Draft: 11 ft 8 in (3.56 m)
- Propulsion: diesel electric, 2,500hp
- Speed: 12 knots (22 km/h)
- Complement: 57 officers and enlisted
- Armament: one single 3 in (76 mm) gun mount, four twin 20 mm gun mounts

USS Cinnamon (AN-50/YN-69) was an Ailanthus-class net laying ship which served with the U.S. Navy in the South Pacific Ocean theatre of operations during World War II. Her career was without major incident, and she returned home after the war bearing one battle star to her credit.

== Launched in California ==
Cinnamon (YN-69) was launched 6 June 1943 as Royal Palm by Pollock-Stockton Shipbuilding Company, Stockton, California; sponsored by Mrs. E. R. Ward; renamed Cinnamon 7 December 1943; and commissioned 10 January 1944. She was reclassified AN-50 on 20 January 1944.

== World War II service ==
Departing San Diego, California, 6 April 1944, Cinnamon arrived at Milne Bay, New Guinea, 18 May. She supported operations in the New Guinea area until 17 January 1945 when she sailed to Manus and the Philippines, where she remained until 17 November.

== Post-war service ==
She sailed for San Francisco, California, arriving 22 December, and from 8 January to 15 November 1946, Cinnamon operated under Commandant, 11th Naval District out of San Pedro, California. Arriving at Pearl Harbor 25 November 1946, she departed 21 January 1947 and sailed via Wake Island and Guam to Shanghai, arriving 15 March.

== Decommissioning in China ==
Cinnamon was decommissioned 25 March 1947 and transferred to Nationalist China through the U.S. State Department.

== Honors and awards ==
Cinnamon was awarded one battle star for service in World War II.
