= Pollock-Stockton Shipbuilding Company =

American war company

- Company type: Ship Construction
- Industry: Engineering; Construction
- Founded: 1943
- Founder: George Pollock
- Headquarters: Stockton, California
- Key people: George Pollock President; Gordon Pollock Manager; Edgar Chief Engineer
- Products: Ships and barges

Pollock-Stockton Shipbuilding Company was established in 1942 to build ships needed for World War II. As part of the Emergency Shipbuilding Program the US Navy provided some of the capital to start Pollock-Stockton Shipbuilding at Stockton, California. The shipyard was located at San Joaquin River and Stockton Channel, near Louis Park. After the war the shipyard closed down in February 1946.

== Background ==
George Pollock (1886-1950) had started the Pollock Construction Company which built Tower Bridge over the Sacramento River that opened on December 15, 1935. Pollock Construction Company also help built the Shasta Dam started in 1938, 5 miles of the All American Canal, Caldecott Tunnel opened in 1937 and the Boulder Dam Pollock Construction Company also built part of the Mare Island Naval Shipyard. The Pollock Construction Company was chosen to build ships, because of their reputation and skills, particularly welding. Since the coastal shipyards were busy building large vessels for the war effort, such as aircraft carriers, battleships, cruisers and destroyers, there was no alternative but to use other builders, like bridge builders for the production of small and medium ships. George Pollock received US government contracts also because he met the United States Department of War's requirement that manufacturing of strategic military materiel be produced 60 miles or more from the Ocean in order to be outside the range of naval gunfire. George Pollock and his brother Gordon Pollock leased 50 acres on the north side of the Stockton Channel near Louis Park and started the Pollock-Stockton Shipbuilding Company. The Navy need large floating dry docks to repair ships in the Asiatic-Pacific Theater or war. The advanced base sectional docks were built in sections and towed in sections across the Pacific Ocean to remote naval bases, then assembled them there. Pollock-Stockton Shipbuilding built some of these sections that were 93 feet long and five stories high. Later Pollock-Stockton Shipbuilding also built rescue boats, barges, supply boats, salvage boats and net laying ships. Pollock-Stockton Shipbuilding reached a peak employment of 8,000 in 1944. George Pollock closed the shipyard in 1946. Pollock worked on fixing up a number of naval installations in the Philippines, Guam and the Hawaiian Islands. He retired from construction and moved to Bakersfield, California, where he grew his passion for cattle raising and became a breeder of heifer cattle. George Pollockne at his peak owned more than 2,000 head of cattle. George Pollock died on January 15, 1950, in Bakersfield, California at age 64.

== Ships built by Pollock-Stockton Shipbuilding ==
=== Large Auxiliary Floating Dry Docks (AFDB) ===
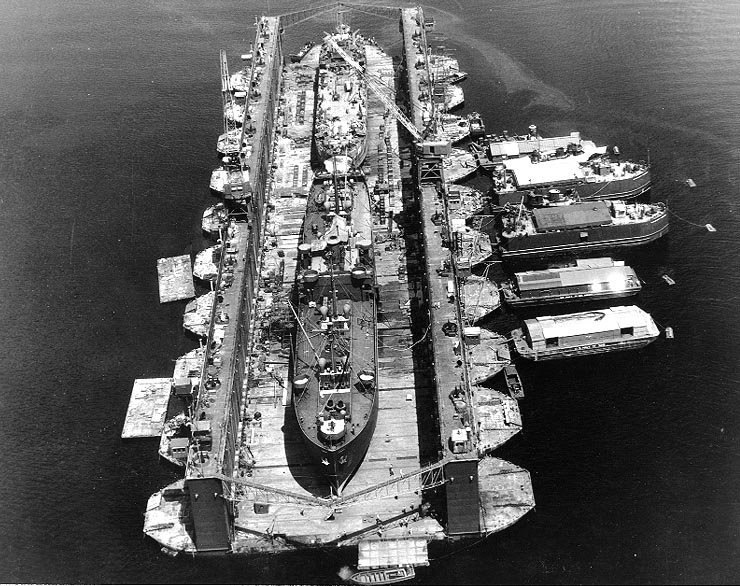
Pollock-Stockton Shipbuilding's USS Artisan (ABSD-1) with USS Antelope (IX-109) and LST-120 in the dock at Espiritu Santo, New Hebrides Islands, 8 January 1945

Auxiliary Floating Docks, Big, came in sections that are 3,850 tons and are 93 feet long each. Each Section had a 165 feet beam, a 75 feet molded depth and had 10,000 tons lifting capacity each. They are also known as Advance Base Sectional Docks (ABSD). Sections could be put together to lift larger ships. AFDB were needed to repair battleships, aircraft carriers, cruisers, and large auxiliary ships. AFDB-1 Artisan had 10 sections (A to J) for a total lift of 100,000 tons and was 1,000 feet long with all 10 sections installed. AFDB-1 to 7 were built between 1943 and 1945 and then towed to remote navy bases. An AFDB would have a crew of 600 to 1000 men, have a fresh-water distilling plant and be self-sustaining. They had a rail traveling 15-ton capacity crane with an 85-foot radius and two or more support barges. To pump out the water in the tanks there were two 24-inch discharge pumps on each section, each pump rated 15,000 gpm. For power there were two 350-kw diesel AC generators on each section, producing 440 volts 3-phase 60-cycle power. Had steam plants to run the pumps. Each section could store 65,000 gal. of fuel oil, this was to supply the ships under repair. For the crew to live next to the AFDB the Navy had barracks ships called APL, that dock next to the AFDB.

Sections of the:

- USS Artisan (ABSD-1)
- USS ABSD-3
- Los Alamos (AFDB-7)

=== Medium Auxiliary Floating Dry Docks (AFDM) ===
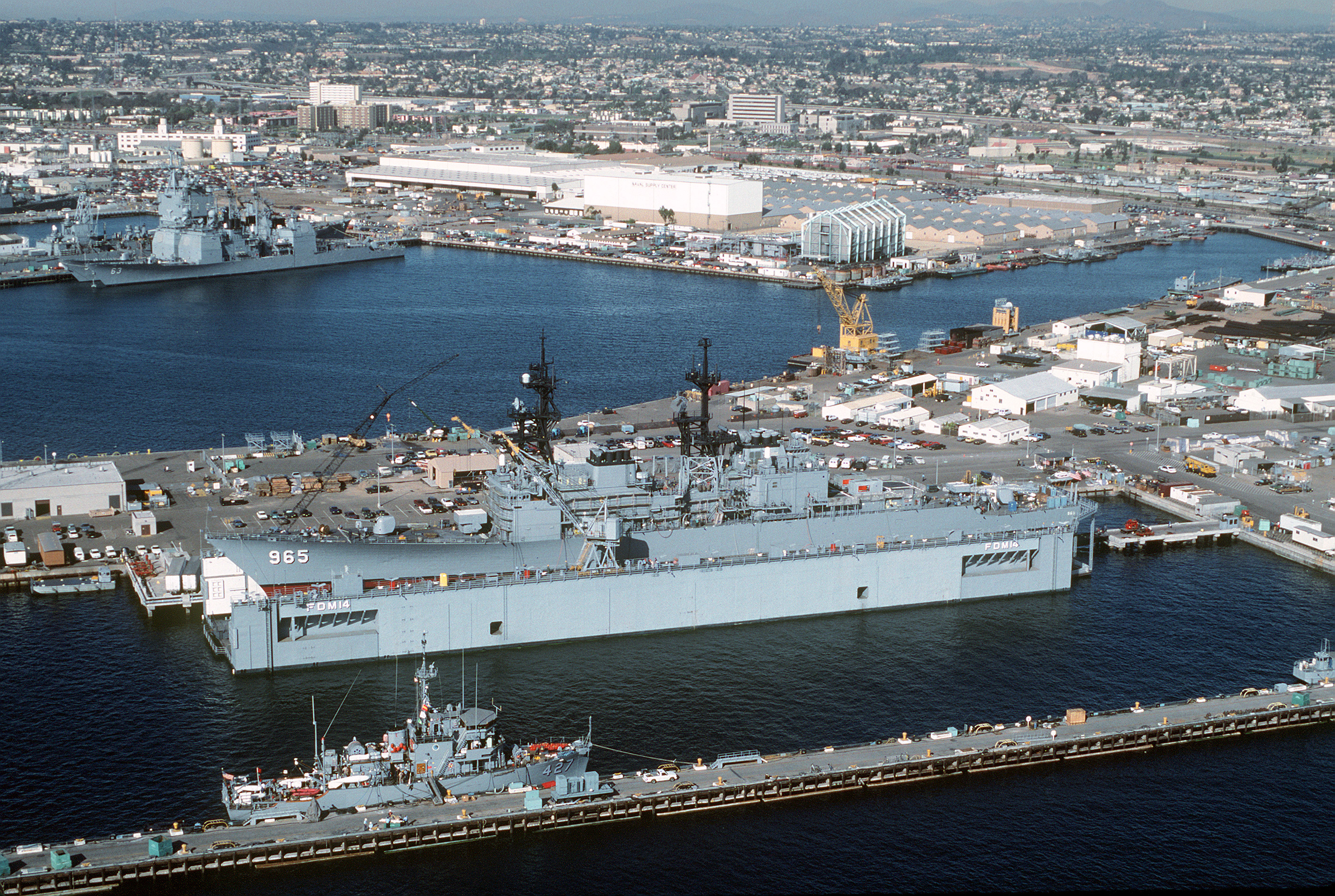
USS Kinkaid (DD-965) in floating drydock Steadfast

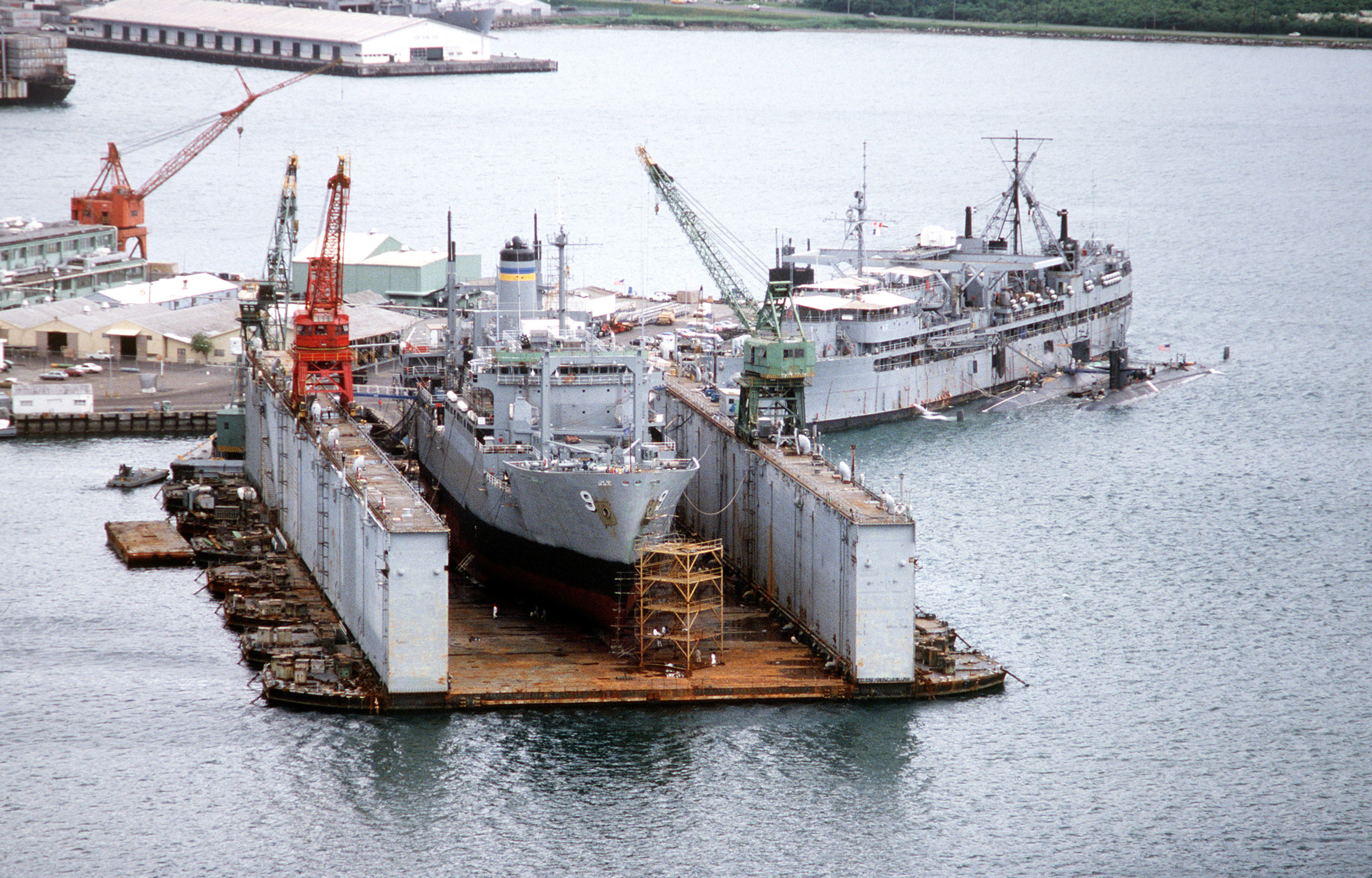
AFDM-14 sister ship the USS Resourceful (AFDM-5) and under repair USNS Spica (T-AFS-9) at Subic Bay

AFDM are from 6,800 to 8,000 tons and are from 528 to 622 feet long. AFDM has crew of 140 to 200 men. AFDM had a lift capacity 18,000 tons and armed with two 40mm and four 20mm guns. Had two 7 1/2-ton cranes with 16 ballast tank compartments. AFDM were built in three pieces, a long center section and two shorter sections at each end. All AFDM had Yard Floating Docks (YFD) class numbers also.

- USS Steadfast (AFDM-14) Also called YFD 71, sold private in 1998

=== Net layer ships ===
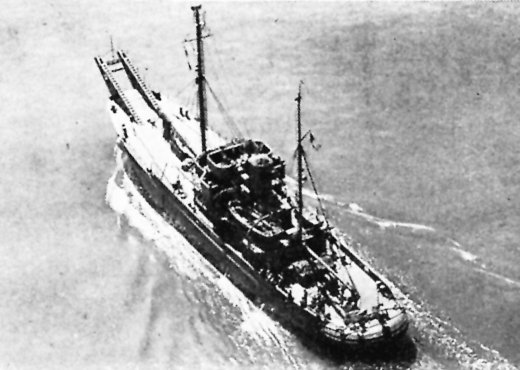
Pollock-Stockton Shipbuilding's USS Silverbell (AN-51) a 1,100 tons Net layer ship in 1945

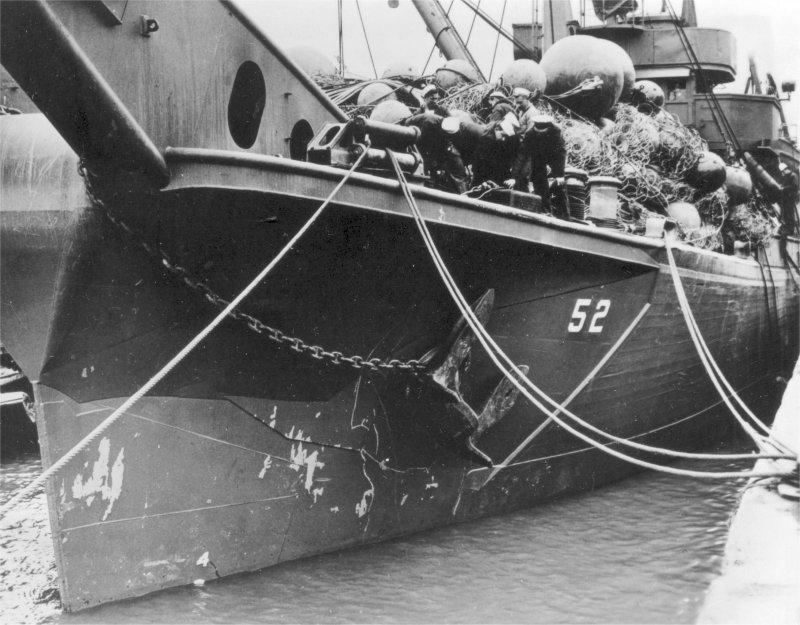
Pollock-Stockton Shipbuilding's USS Snowbell (AN-52) tending nets

Net laying ships that were 1,100 tons and 194 feet long. A net layer's primary function was to lay and maintain steel anti-torpedo or anti-submarine nets. Nets could be laid around an individual ship at anchor, or around harbors or other anchorages. As World War II progressed, net layers were pressed into a variety of additional roles including salvage, troop and cargo transport, buoy maintenance, and service as tugboats. Ailanthus-class net laying ships:

- USS Lancewood (AN-48) 18-Oct-43 - YN 67, Was Ironwood renamed in 1944, to France 1947
- USS Papaya (AN-49) 1-Dec-43 YN 68, to MARAD 1946
- USS Cinnamon (AN-50) 10-Jan-44 - YN 69, was Royal Palm renamed in 1944, to Taiwan 1947
- USS Silverbell (AN-51) 16-Feb-44 - YN 70, to Taiwan 1947, discarded
- USS Snowbell (AN-52) 16-Mar-44 - YN 71, damaged by typhoon off Okinawa 1945 gone in 1946
- USS Spicewood (AN-53) 7-Apr-44 - YN 72, sold 1946
- USS Manchineel (AN-54) 26-Apr-44 YN 73, Was Sumac renamed in 1943, sold 1947
- USS Torchwood (AN-55) 12-May-44 YN 74, to Taiwan 1946
- USS Winterberry (AN-56) 30-May-44 YN 75, sold 1947
- USS Viburnum (AN-57) 2-Jun-44 YN 76, sold 1947

=== Barracks Barge ===
Pollock-Stockton Shipbuilding's US Navy Barracks Barges was 1,300 tons and 261 feet long. Used for use as a temporary barracks for sailors or other military personnel. A barracks ship also were used as a receiving unit for sailors who need temporary residence prior to being assigned to their ship. Barracks Barge are a type of auxiliary ship, called an APL for auxiliary personal living.

- APL 23 Scrapped 1974
- APL 24 To MARAD 1962
- APL 25 Scrapped 1973
- APL 25 (Green Apple)

=== Repair Barge ===
Repair Barge or Floating Workshops were self-sustaining, 530 tons and 153 feet long built in 1944. They had a beam with of 36 feet and draft of 6 feet. Repair Barge had a machine shop, living accommodations. They repaired small boats and craft. The barge had generators, distilling plant, air compressor and steam boiler. The living space had bed berths, mess hall to support 48 men: 47 enlisted ones, and one Chief petty officer.

- YR 67 renamed YRB 32
- YR 68 renamed YRB 34

=== Freight Barges (YFN) ===
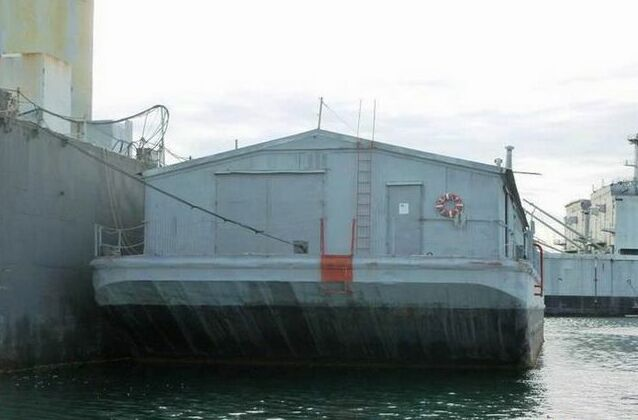
A type of YFN, the YFN-958 a covered lighter barge, non-Self-propelled

Pollock-Stockton Shipbuilding's YFN barges were 700 tons and 261 feet long. They were not self-propelled. A Navy class Type B ship. Also called a Lighter.

- YFN 619
- YFN 620
- YFN 621 Later YFNB 5, sold 2004
- YFN 622
- YFN 623
- YFN 738
- YFN 739
- YFN 740 Later YRBM 19, YFNB 19, YRBM 56
- YFN 741
- YFN 742
- YFN 998
- YFN 999
- YFN 1000
- YFN 1001
- YFN 1002
- YFN 1003
- YFN 1004
- YFN 1005
- YFN 1006
- YFN 1007
- YFN 1008
- YFN 1009
- YFN 1010
- YFN 1011
- YFN 1012
- YFN 1013
- YFN 1014
- YFN 1015
- YFN 1016

== See also ==
- California during World War II
- Moore Equipment Company in Stockton
- Hickinbotham Brothers Shipbuilders in Stockton
