= Hoo (surname) =

Hoo is a surname. The most common origin for the contemporary surname is that it is an alternate spelling of Hu (surname). Notable people with the surname include:

- Hoo Ah Kay (1816–1880), Singaporean businessman
- Alan Hoo (born 1951), Hong Kong barrister
- Hoo Cha-pen (1924–2004), Taiwanese basketball coach
- Hoo Cher Mou, Singaporean air force general and chief
- Geri Hoo (1939–2007), actress, 1958 Miss Universe contestant as a representative of Hawaii
- Hoo Kam Chiu (1910–?), Hong Kong sport shooter
- Hoo Pang Ron (born 1998), Malaysian badminton player
- Vivian Hoo Kah Mun (born 1990), Malaysian badminton player
- Hoo Yee Fan (born 1994), Chinese chess prodigy
- Hōō Umagorō (1866–1907), Japanese sumo wrestler
- Hōō Tomomichi (1956–2013), Japanese sumo wrestler
- Iso Hoo (born Carl Henrik Rosenberg, 1979), Finnish rapper
- Thomas Hoo, Baron Hoo and Hastings (died 1455), member of the ancient "Hoo" or "de Hoo" family of England

== See also ==
- Hu (surname)
