= Crouching Tiger, Hidden Dragon (disambiguation) =

Crouching Tiger, Hidden Dragon (臥虎藏龍; Wò Hǔ, Cáng Lóng) is a 2000 Chinese-language film, based on the novel by Wang Dulu.

Crouching Tiger, Hidden Dragon can also refer to:

- Crouching Tiger, Hidden Dragon (novel), a 1942 novel by Wang Dulu, on which the 2000 film is based
- Crouching Tiger, Hidden Dragon (TV series), a 2001 Taiwanese TV series based on the novel
- Crouching Tiger, Hidden Dragon (comics), a 2002-2005 comic book series based on the novel
- Crouching Tiger, Hidden Dragon (video game), a 2003 video game by Ubisoft based on the 2000 film
- Crouching Tiger, Hidden Dragon (soundtrack), the 2000 film's soundtrack album
- Crouching Tiger, Hidden Dragon: Sword of Destiny, a 2016 sequel to the 2000 film

== See also ==
- Crouching Tiger (disambiguation)
- Tiger (disambiguation)
- Dragon (disambiguation)
