= Doctor Who (pinball) =

1992 pinball machine

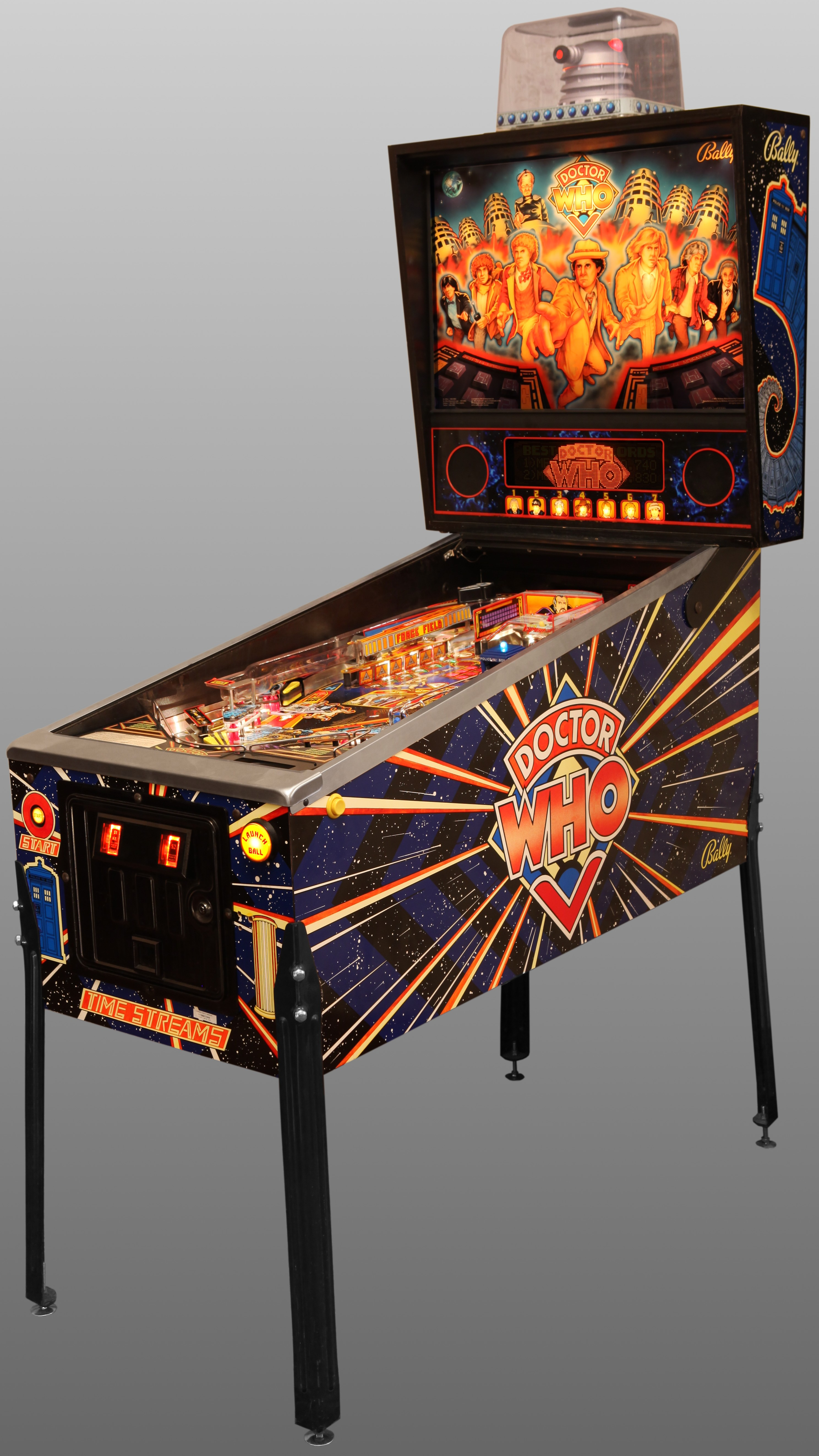
- Manufacturer: Midway
- Release date: September 1992
- System: Midway WPC (Fliptronics II)
- Design: Bill Pfutzenreuter, Barry Oursler
- Programming: Bill Pfutzenreuter
- Artwork: Linda Deal
- Mechanics: Zofia Bil
- Music: Jon Hey
- Sound: Jon Hey, Paul Heitsch
- Voices: Sylvester McCoy (The Doctor); Terry Molloy (Davros); Brian Miller (Daleks)
- Production run: 7,752

Doctor Who is a pinball machine designed by Bill Pfutzenreuter and Barry Oursler, and released by Midway (under the Bally brand name) in September 1992. It is based on the BBC television series Doctor Who.

== Design ==
The initial design for the game by Bill Pfutzenreuter was found not to be enjoyable, so he asked Barry Oursler for assistance.

The first 100 games included a moving Dalek topper that would turn side-to-side while was speaking. The effect was achieved by fitting the robot's body with a complex motor, cam, and optoelectronics system. Its complexity and expense led to it being cut from the production run. Software support for this feature remained in the game, and production Dalek toppers can be made to move with aftermarket kits.

Prototypes used the old Bally-style backbox (and a different backglass), but this was changed to the Williams-style one to lower production costs.

The design of the time-expander was protected by a patent. This mini-playfield area was designed to be as small as possible.

The license was primarily aimed at the European market.

The game was originally designed to feature Anthony Ainley's the Master much more heavily than in the final version.

playfield

== Gameplay ==
The basic gameplay is all about the various incarnations of the Doctor (seven at the time of production). Each Doctor affects the rules or scoring for a different section of the playfield, as described below.

- Doctor 1 (played in the series by William Hartnell): Awards an extra "E-S-C-A-P-E" letter every time a target in that bank is hit or the ball drops into the sinkhole below the bumpers, thus enabling easier earning of the Video Mode (which can then be used to "collect" the currently selected Doctor) and Special.
- Doctor 2 (played in the series by Patrick Troughton): Allows more time to make the "Hang-On" shot and doubles its value.
- Doctor 3 (played in the series by Jon Pertwee): Allows more time to complete the shots in the "W-H-O" sequence and thus light extra balls.
- Doctor 4 (played in the series by Tom Baker): Awards an extra "R-E-P-A-I-R" letter whenever any target in that bank is hit, increasing the value of all of them.
- Doctor 5 (played in the series by Peter Davison): Doubles Jet Bumper score, which also results in a faster lighting of the Transmat (to "collect" the currently selected Doctor).
- Doctor 6 (played in the series by Colin Baker): Increases the Playfield Multiplier by one instead of one-half for every loop shot (to a maximum of four), and slows the rate at which the multiplier decreases.
- Doctor 7 (played in the series by Sylvester McCoy): Awards a Time Expander factor every time the center Lock target is hit, and an extra factor whenever any of the five up/down targets are hit, thus allowing an easier start to multiball.

=== Areas of Importance ===
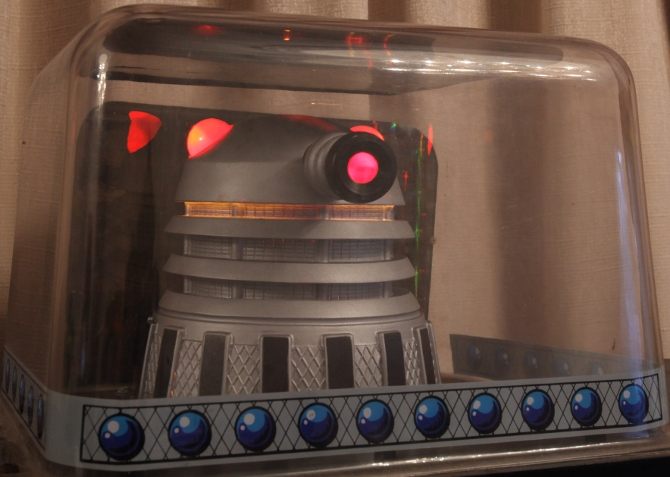
Dalek on top of backbox

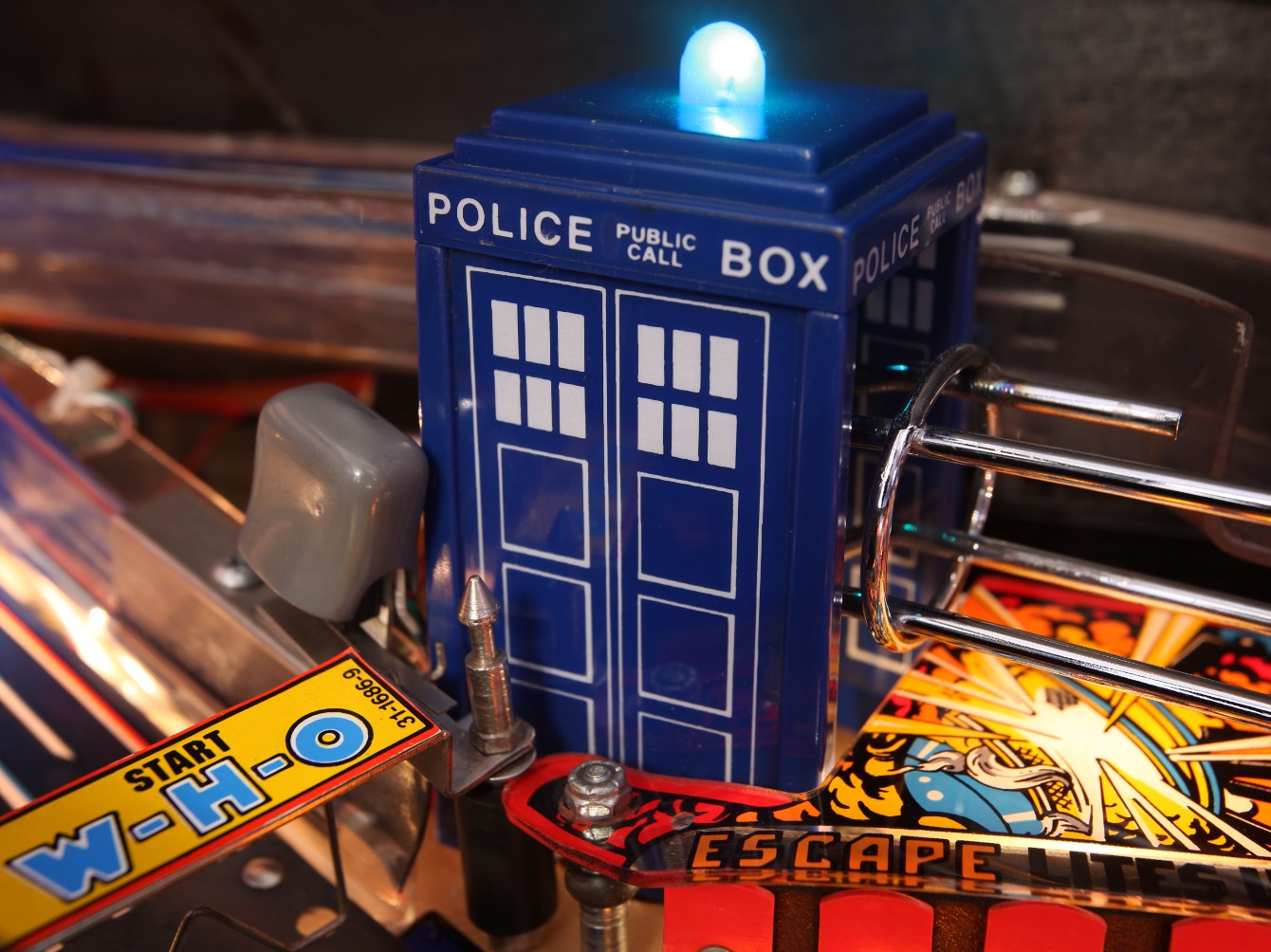
Tardis in playfield

Each zone on the playfield features a different one of the seven Doctors depicted in the game. The player may choose one Doctor when launching each ball, indicated by the flashing of his number (on the playfield) and his picture (in a row of seven on the backglass). The flashing Doctor can be permanently lit through the areas for Doctors 1 and 5 as shown below, and all seven can be lit at once by scoring an Emperor Dalek jackpot in multiball.

The areas, and their effect on the game, are as follows:

- Doctor 1: Lower right-hand orange target bank, labeled "E-S-C-A-P-E" - When all six of these targets are lit, the player can shoot the upper left orbit (toward the jet bumpers) to enable video mode. Each successfully completed video mode wave awards the currently lit Doctor, and alters the game's ruleset as described above.
- Doctor 2: Left entrance lane above the upper left flipper. Hang On mode is enabled when the right inlane switch is tripped; a flashing red arrow lights up next to the upper left flipper when it is active. If the left entrance lane is hit before time runs out, the current Hang On value is awarded and then doubled for the next shot. Hitting the lane while the arrow is not lit only awards a small Collision value.
- Doctor 3: Right ramp, left entrance lane, and upper right loop, in that order. Accomplishing this sequence of shots lights "W-H-O", which can award extra balls after a specific number of completions of the pattern. Using the factory settings, the first extra ball is enabled after 2 W-H-O sequences are completed. When enabled, an inlane or outlane (which can be changed by using the flippers) lights, tripping the lane switch awards an extra ball.
- Doctor 4: Upper left target bank, labeled "R-E-P-A-I-R." Hitting any of the six targets in this bank gives the player a set length of time to hit another one before they all time out. Completing the bank enables Unlimited Millions, which causes each successive hit on the target bank to award an ever-increasing number of points. As long as the target bank continues to be hit before time runs out, the award will continue to increase and grow upon itself.
- Doctor 5: The Transmat is enabled after scoring 1,000,000 points on the jet bumpers. If Doctor 5 is already awarded, the jet bumpers will score double their normal value, building the Transmat's charge faster. Once the Transmat is fully charged, the player can hit the target just underneath the upper right loop to Transmat the currently selected Doctor. The rule changes pertaining to that Doctor then remain in effect for the rest of the game.
- Doctor 6: Upper right loop. Successive loops enable a full-playfield multiplier of up to 4X. Without Doctor 6 scored, and using default settings, the game's playfield multiplier advances at 0.5X per loop completed, and the amount of time each step of the multiplier remains active gets shorter until 4X (which is 10 seconds long). With Doctor 6, the playfield multiplier advances by 1 instead of 0.5, again to a maximum of 4X, and the time for each step of the multiplier lengthens. Additionally, every 10th loop enables the Sonic Boom, which reroutes the ball back to the left inlane. The player can then hit the W-H-O shots (right ramp, left entrance lane, upper right loop) in order to earn 10 million per shot.
- Doctor 7: Center target bank and mini-playfield (The Time Expander). Without Doctor 7, each hit on the row of 5 targets on level 2 of the Mini-Playfield lights a single Time Expander Factor (15 of which are needed to start multiball). With Doctor 7 enabled, each hit on these targets counts double. Additionally, if Doctor 7 is collected, hitting the center target while the mini-playfield is on Level 1 will light a Time Expander Factor, and if the player fails to score a jackpot during the first wave of multiball, the center target on level 1 will add more time to the re-lock timer.

=== Multiball ===
Time expander in lowered position

Time expander nearing raised position

The Multiball mode in Dr. Who begins after the player lights 15 Time Expander Factors after locking the ball. After the Time Expander reaches 0, the mini-playfield rises again to level 3, which has three gates in it with a small picture of a Dalek on the front. The player must shoot one of the doors to start multiball. Once the player has done this, the mini playfield lowers, releases the two locked balls, and then rises again back to level 3. To earn the jackpot, the player must hit all three gates on level three of the mini-playfield. This awards a jackpot that begins at 5,000,000 points for the lowest tier of Daleks and grows dramatically as the player rises through the ranks of Daleks (up to the Emperor Dalek at 50,000,000 points). After the player defeats the Emperor Dalek, Davros is revealed as the arch-villain behind the story. The mini-playfield lowers itself back to Level 2, and to defeat Davros, the player must hit the bank of 5 targets once (more if the player has already defeated Davros) to deactivate Davros' shield and get the mini-playfield to raise back to level 3. Once Davros' shield is down, the player must hit the three gates on level 3 again, after which a 100,000,000-point Davros Jackpot is awarded. All jackpots are affected by the playfield multiplier, allowing the player to collect tremendous numbers of points from a single jackpot (1,200,000,000 points if Davros has been defeated twice before and the Playfield Multiplier is 4).

== Reception ==
Writing for The Flipside Lyman Sheats found the game to have a variety of shots, but had two design flaws which can cause unfair drains. He still considered it one of the better releases of that year.

In a retro article about the machine in 2021, Pinball Mag found it to be underrated.

== Digital versions ==
The table was released for The Pinball Arcade on 1 October 2016 and delisted on 30 June 2018 due to the loss of the WMS license.

An updated version, dubbed Master of Time, was announced alongside the original. Originally planned for an October 2016 release, the revised table was released on 21 December 2016. Based on the original Doctor Who pinball machine, the new table focuses on incarnations of the Doctor that debuted after the classic series and instead has the player choose a villain to face rather than an individual Doctor to play as. The table features new voiceover recorded by Peter Capaldi as the Twelfth Doctor, and Michelle Gomez as Missy, as well as using voice clips from past new-series Doctors taken from the show. This updated version is still available for purchase.
