= Hooe =

Hooe may refer to:

== People ==
- Bernard Hooe Jr., American lawyer, member of the Virginia House of Delegates and mayor of Alexandria
- Rice Hooe, the name of three Virginia colonists, including Rhys Hooe (c. 1599 – after 1655)
- Robert T. Hooe, District of Columbia Justice of the Peace
- Virgil Hooe, American volleyball coach

== Places ==
- Hooe, East Sussex, England
- Hooe, Plymouth, England

== See also ==
- United States v. Hooe, a 1803 United States Supreme Court case
- Lloyd House (Alexandria, Virginia), also known as the Wise-Hooe-Loyd house
