= MEH =

Meh is an English interjection expressing indifference or boredom.

MEH or meh may refer to:

== Music ==
- "@ Meh", a 2020 single by rapper Playboi Carti
- "Meh", another 2020 song by the rapper on Whole Lotta Red

== Science and technology ==
- Multiple-effect humidification, a seawater desalination method
- Microsomal epoxide hydrolase, an intestinal enzyme

== Other uses ==
- National Security Service (Turkey) (Turkish: Milli Emniyet Hizmeti)
- Mehamn Airport, Norway (IATA code: MEH)
- Nuyoo Mixtec, a language spoken in Mexico (ISO 639-3 code: meh)
- meh.com, an experimental e-commerce site
