= Wu Hu =

Wu Hu may refer to:

- Five Lakes (China) (Chinese: 五湖; pinyin: Wǔ Hú)
- Five Barbarians (Chinese: 五胡; pinyin: Wǔ Hú)
- Five Tiger Generals (Chinese: 五虎將; pinyin: Wǔ Hǔ Jiàng)

== See also ==
- Wuhu (disambiguation)
