= USS Torchwood =

History

United States
- Name: USS Torchwood (YN-74)
- Namesake: Torchwood
- Builder: Pollock-Stockton Shipbuilding Company, Stockton, California
- Laid down: 2 June 1943
- Reclassified: AN-55, 20 January 1944
- Launched: 19 February 1944
- Sponsored by: Mrs. Henry F. Bruns
- Commissioned: 12 May 1944, San Francisco, California
- Decommissioned: 26 October 1946, Shanghai
- Stricken: 23 April 1947
- Home port: San Pedro, California
- Fate: turned over to the Foreign Liquidation Commission which, in turn, transferred her to the Chinese Maritime Customs Service; fate unknown

General characteristics
- Class & type: Ailanthus-class net laying ship
- Displacement: 1,460 tons
- Length: 194 ft 6 in (59.28 m)
- Beam: 34 ft 7 in (10.54 m)
- Draft: 11 ft 8 in (3.56 m)
- Propulsion: diesel electric, 2,500hp
- Speed: 12.1 knots (22.4 km/h)
- Complement: 56 officers and enlisted
- Armament: one single 3 in (76 mm) gun mount, three twin 20 mm gun mounts

USS Torchwood (AN-55/YN-74) was an Ailanthus-class net laying ship which served with the U.S. Navy in the Pacific Ocean theatre of operations during World War II. She performed her net laying services until war's end, and then was given to the Republic of China.

== Launched at Stockton, California ==
Torchwood (YN-74) was laid down on 22 June 1943 at Stockton, California, by the Pollock-Stockton Shipbuilding Company, redesignated AN-55 on 20 January 1944; launched on 19 February 1944; sponsored by Mrs. Henry F. Bruns; and commissioned at San Francisco, California, on 12 May 1944.

== World War II service ==
=== Pacific Ocean operations ===
After fitting-out, Torchwood cleared San Francisco on 3 June 1944 and arrived in San Pedro, California, two days later to begin a month of training. On 3 July, she put to sea, bound for Hawaii, and arrived at Pearl Harbor on the 11th.

After almost a fortnight in the Hawaiian Islands, she got underway on 23 July and shaped a course for the southwestern Pacific Ocean. She made a brief stop at Funafuti in the Ellice Islands on 7 August and, 10 days later, reached Milne Bay, New Guinea, where she reported for duty with the U.S. 7th Fleet.

Torchwood served in the anchorage at Milne Bay through mid-September and then moved forward to support the landings in the Netherlands East Indies at Morotai. By early December, she was at Manus in the Admiralty Islands, but she got underway again on the 4th and returned to Milne Bay on the 6th. Three days later, she moved on to Hollandia, where she operated for a month from 14 December 1944 to 15 January 1945. After a short tour of duty at Woendi—between 18 and 25 January—she returned to Hollandia, where she served until late June.

On 2 July 1945, Torchwood took station in Leyte Gulf with the underwater defense forces and remained there through the end of the war.

== Post-war operations ==
On 17 November 1945, she headed back to the United States and, after stops at Eniwetok and Pearl Harbor, reached San Francisco on 22 December. On 7 January 1946, she headed south and, two days later, arrived in San Pedro, California, her base until 7 July when she sailed for Hawaii. The ship entered Pearl Harbor on the 16th, and remained there until 24 August when she got underway for the western Pacific.

After two very brief stops—one at Eniwetok and the other at Guam -- Torchwood arrived in Subic Bay in the Philippines on 14 September. There, she reported to the Commander, Philippine Sea Frontier, to await decommissioning for her transfer to the government of China by the Foreign Liquidation Commission. On 2 October, she departed Subic Bay and headed for China.

== Decommissioned in China ==
She arrived in Shanghai on the 7th and, on the 26th, was decommissioned. That same day, she was turned over to the Foreign Liquidation Commission which, in turn, transferred her to the Chinese Maritime Customs Service. Torchwood''s name was struck from the Navy list on 23 April 1947.
