= EHD =

EHD may refer to:

- EHD protein family
- Electrohydrodynamics
- English Historical Documents, a series on English history
- Epizootic hemorrhagic disease
- European Heritage Days
