= E. H. (alchemist) =

E. H., also known as eine jungfer ("a young maiden"), was the pseudonymous author of a 1574 alchemical text. Her treatise describes the properties of gold, and includes instructions for processing the metal. It also includes an interpretation of the cryptic Tabula Smaragdina.

In 1702, a German translation of the text was combined with another alchemical tract and a catalog of 17th-century Kabbalistic books and published in Hamburg by Gottfried Liebezeit as Ein ausführlicher Tractat von Philosophischen Werck des Steins der Weisen, durch eine Jungfer E. H. genannt anno 1574 geschrieben. Samt einer gründlichen Untersuchung... der Art und Eigenschafft des Goldes...dabey angefüget: ein Catalogus Librorum Kabalisticorum. Liebezeit did not know the identity of E. H., but believed she had written the original version in French.

In 2026, German artist Anselm Kiefer included a painting of E. H. in his collection, The Women Alchemists, which was displayed in Milan's Sala delle Cariatidi as part of the cultural showcase of the 2026 Winter Olympics.
