= USS Lancewood =

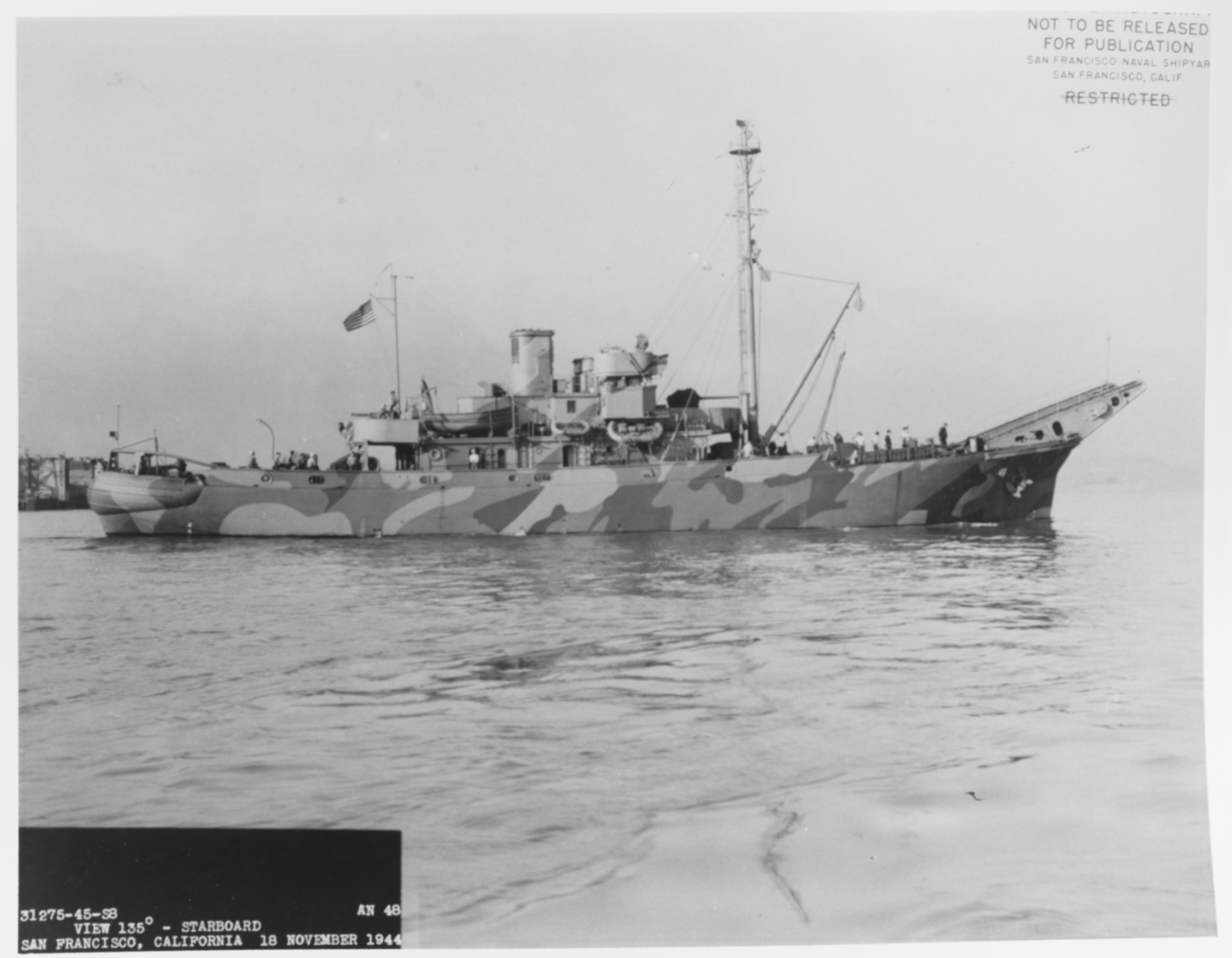
- USS Lancewood off San Francisco in 1944

History

United States
- Name: USS Ironwood (YN-67)
- Namesake: Ironwood tree
- Builder: Pollock-Stockton Shipbuilding Company, Stockton, California
- Laid down: 15 October 1942
- Renamed: Lancewood, 3 April 1943
- Namesake: Lancewood tree
- Launched: 2 May 1943
- Commissioned: 18 October 1943
- Reclassified: AN-48, 20 January 1944
- Decommissioned: 11 February 1946
- Honors and awards: One battle star, World War II
- Fate: Transferred to France, 3 May 1947

France
- Name: Commandant Charcot
- Namesake: Jean-Baptiste Charcot
- Acquired: 3 May 1947
- Fate: Unknown

General characteristics
- Class & type: Ailanthus-class net laying ship
- Displacement: 1,100 long tons (1,100 t) (standard); 1,275 long tons (1,295 t) (full)
- Length: 194 ft 7 in (59.31 m)
- Beam: 37 ft (11 m)
- Draft: 13 ft 6 in (4.11 m)
- Propulsion: Diesel-electric; 2,500 hp
- Speed: 12 knots (22 km/h; 14 mph)
- Complement: 56 officers and enlisted
- Armament: One single 3 in (76 mm) gun mount, four twin 20 mm gun mounts

USS Lancewood (AN-48/YN-67) was an Ailanthus-class net laying ship built for the United States Navy during World War II. In service in the Pacific during the war, she earned one battle star. After her February 1946 decommissioning, she was sold to France as Commandant Charcot. Her fate is not reported in secondary sources.

== Career ==
Lancewood (YN-67) was laid down as Ironwood 15 October 1942 by Pollock-Stockton Shipbuilding Company, Stockton, California; renamed Lancewood 3 April 1943; launched 2 May 1943; and commissioned 18 October 1943. After shakedown off the California coast, Lancewood was assigned to the 12th Naval District, San Francisco, California. Reclassified AN-48 on 20 January 1944, she tended nets and repaired net lines until departing San Francisco 1 December. Loaded with fleet moorings, she steamed via San Pedro, California, to Pearl Harbor, where she arrived the 16th.

Lancewood sailed for the western Pacific Ocean 24 January 1945. After touching Eniwetok and Guam, she reached a holding area off Iwo Jima 20 February and 3 days later began pulling damaged landing craft off the beaches to facilitate unloading operations. She placed moorings, laid nets, and salvaged landing craft off Iwo Jima until 12 April when she departed for the Mariana Islands.

Lancewood served at Guam from 19 April to 10 June; then she proceeded to Ulithi, where she arrived 12 June for duty as net repair ship. She began to remove net defenses 30 August, then steamed to Yap Island 2 September for the surrender of Japanese forces there the following day. She remained at Yap until 7 September, returned to Ulithi the 8th, and resumed net removal operations.

Loaded with net panels, Lancewood sailed to Saipan 14 to 17 October and unloaded her cargo. Departing 26 October, she steamed via Midway Islands and Pearl Harbor for the U.S. West Coast, arriving San Francisco 25 November.

Remaining at San Francisco, she decommissioned 11 February 1946. Berthed at Suisun Bay, California, she was sold 28 April 1947 to Robert A. Martinolich, San Francisco, and transferred 3 May to the U.S. Maritime Commission for simultaneous delivery to her purchaser, the French government, and commissioned as Commandant Charcot.

== Honors and awards ==
Lancewood received one battle star for World War II service.
