= Heh =

Heh or HEH may refer to:

- Heh (god), an Egyptian deity
- Heh (letter), the fifth letter of many Semitic alphabets
- (H.E.H) His Exalted Highness, A salutation style used for the Nizams of Hyderabad State
- Hehe language, spoken in Tanzania
- Heho Airport, in Shan State, Burma
- Helium hydride ion (HeH^{+})
- House of European History, a museum in Brussels.
