= Guess Who =

Guess Who may refer to:

- "Guess Who" (Jesse Belvin song), a 1959 hit song for Jesse Belvin
- Guess Who (B. B. King album), 1972
- Guess Who (Slim Whitman album), 1971
- Guess Who (EP), a 2021 EP by South Korean girl group Itzy
- Guess Who (film), a 2005 romantic comedy starring Bernie Mac, Ashton Kutcher and Zoë Saldaña
- Guess Who (rapper), a Romanian hip hop artist
- Guess Who?, a guessing game made popular by the Milton Bradley Company
- "Guess Who", a Goodie Mob song from their debut album, Soul Food (1995)
- "Guess Who", a 1966 Tages song from their album Tages 2
- The Guess Who, a rock band from Winnipeg, Manitoba, Canada
