= Huh =

Huh or HUH may refer to:

== Linguistics ==
- Huh? (paralanguage), a universal expression requesting an explanation

== Arts and entertainment ==
- huH (magazine), a 1994–1996 American music magazine
- "Huh?!" a 2023 song by Agust D
- "Huh!", a song by Doechii from Alligator Bites Never Heal
- Huh?, a 1991 animated short film by Mike Judge
- "HuH", a 2010 song by 4Minute from Hit Your Heart

== Acronyms and codes ==
- HUH-tag (histidine-hydrophobic-histidine), a DNA binding protein
- Harvard University Herbaria, Cambridge, Massachusetts, U.S.
- Howard University Hospital, Washington, D.C., U.S.
- Huahine – Fare Airport (IATA code), French Polynesia
- Huilliche language (ISO 639-3 code), an Araucanian language in Chile
- Hung Hom station (station code), a railway station in Hong Kong

== Other uses ==
- Huh (god) or Heh, an Egyptian deity
- Huh (name) or Heo, a Korean surname

== See also ==
- Sweet Heart Sweet Light (working title: Huh?), a 2012 album by Spiritualized
